= Timeline of disability rights in the United States =

This disability rights timeline lists events relating to the civil rights of people with disabilities in the United States of America, including court decisions, the passage of legislation, activists' actions, significant abuses of people with disabilities, and the founding of various organizations. Although the disability rights movement itself began in the 1960s, advocacy for the rights of people with disabilities started much earlier and continues to the present.

== 18th century ==
- 1776 – Following the Revolutionary War, servicemen who had significant injuries or were unable to provide for their household were financially supported by the first pension law, which was enacted by the Continental Congress on August 26, 1776. The Continental Congress enacted the first pension law under which half pay for life or during disability was extended to every officer, soldier or sailor losing a limb in any engagement, or being so disabled in the service of the United States as to render him incapable of earning a living. The resolution allowed for proportionate relief to those who were partially disabled from earning a living. Without the power to raise money to fund the law, however, Congress was dependent on each State to execute the law.

== 19th century ==
- 1817 – The American School for the Deaf was founded in Hartford, Connecticut. This was the first school for children with disabilities anywhere in the western hemisphere.
- 1840s – The M'Naghten rule (pronounced and sometimes spelled, "McNaughton") is any variant of the 1840s jury instruction in a criminal case when there is a defense of insanity:

"that every man is to be presumed to be sane, and... that to establish a defense on the ground of insanity, it must be clearly proved that, at the time of the committing of the act, the party accused was laboring under such a defect of reason, from disease of the mind, as not to know the nature and quality of the act he was doing; or if he did know it, that he did not know he was doing what was wrong." The rules so formulated as M'Naghten's Case 1843 10 C & F 200 have been a standard test for criminal liability in relation to mentally disordered defendants in common law jurisdictions ever since, with some minor adjustments. When the tests set out by the Rules are satisfied, the accused may be adjudged "not guilty by reason of insanity" or "guilty but insane" and the sentence may be a mandatory or discretionary (but usually indeterminate) period of treatment in a secure hospital facility, or otherwise at the discretion of the court (depending on the country and the offence charged) instead of a punitive disposal. The insanity defence is recognized in Australia, Canada, England and Wales, Hong Kong, India, Ireland, New Zealand, Norway and most U.S. states with the exception of Idaho, Kansas, Montana, Utah, and Vermont but not all of these jurisdictions still use the M'Naghten Rules.

- 1850s – When Illinois opened its first hospital for the mentally ill in 1851, the state legislature passed a law that within two years of its passage was amended to require a public hearing before a person could be committed against his or her will. There was one exception, however: a husband could have his wife committed without either a public hearing or her consent.
- 1864 – The U.S. Congress authorized the Columbia Institution for the Instruction of the Deaf and Dumb and the Blind to confer college degrees, and President Abraham Lincoln signed the bill into law. Edward Miner Gallaudet was made president of the entire corporation, including the college. It was the first college in the world established for people with disabilities and is now known as Gallaudet University.
- Late 1800s – 1970s: From the late 1800s until the 1970s, some American cities had unsightly beggar ordinances known colloquially as ugly laws. These laws deemed it illegal for "any person, who is diseased, maimed, mutilated or deformed in any way, so as to be an unsightly or disgusting object, to expose himself to public view."
- 1867 - The first American ordinance pertaining to preventing people with disabilities from appearing in public was one passed in 1867 in San Francisco, California. This ordinance had to do with the broader topic of begging. The wording in the San Francisco ordinance indicates violators will be sent to the almshouse. This connects with the Victorian Era poor law policy.
- 1867 – The first recorded arrest pertaining to ugly laws was Martin Oates in San Francisco, California in July 1867. Oates was a former Union soldier during the American Civil War.
- 1867 – In 1867, the State of Illinois passed a "Bill for the Protection of Personal Liberty" which guaranteed all people accused of insanity, including wives, had the right to a public hearing.
- 1869 – State v. Pike, 49 N.h. 399 (1869), is a criminal case which articulated a product test for an insanity defense. The court in Durham v. United States used it as the basis for what came to be known as the Durham rule.
- 1880 – America's National Association of the Deaf was established.
- 1881 – Portland, Oregon enacted an ugly law.
- 1881 – A Chicago ordinance of 1881 read as follows:
  Any person who is diseased, maimed, mutilated, or in any way deformed, so as to be an unsightly or disgusting object, or an improper person to be allowed in or on the streets, highways, thoroughfares, or public places in the city, shall not therein or thereon expose himself to public view, under the penalty of a fine of $1 for each offense (Chicago City Code 1881)
  The fine of $1 equates to more than $20 in 2018.
- 1881–1890 – At some time from 1881 to 1890 an ugly law was enacted in Omaha, Nebraska.
- 1887 – The graphic depiction of conditions at the Women's Lunatic Asylum on Blackwell's Island in Nellie Bly's book Ten Days in a Mad-House caused a sensation, which brought Bly lasting fame and prompted a grand jury to launch its own investigation, with Bly assisting. The jury's report resulted in an $850,000 increase in the budget of the Department of Public Charities and Corrections. The grand jury also made sure that future examinations were more thorough so that only the seriously ill went to the asylum.
- 1889 – Ugly laws were enacted in Denver, Colorado and Lincoln, Nebraska in 1889.
- 1894 – An ugly law was enacted in Columbus, Ohio in 1894.
- 1891 – An ugly law was enacted for the state of Pennsylvania in 1891. This law contained language applying to cognitive disability as well as physical disability.

== 1900–1939 ==
- 1908 – Clifford Whittingham Beers founded the "Connecticut Society for Mental Hygiene", now named Mental Health Connecticut.
- 1909 – Clifford Whittingham Beers founded the "National Committee for Mental Hygiene", now named "Mental Health America", to reform the treatment of the mentally ill.
- 1910 – State v. Strasburg, 110 P. 1020 (Wash. 1910), was a case decided by the Washington Supreme Court that held that a statute eliminating the insanity defense was unconstitutional. The court likened the exclusion of evidence of insanity to a denial of trial by jury.
- 1914 – Schloendorff v. Society of New York Hospital, 105 N.E. 92 (N.Y. 1914), was a decision issued by the New York Court of Appeals in 1914 which established principles of informed consent and respondeat superior in United States law.
- 1915 – Harry Haiselden was the Chief Surgeon at the German-American Hospital in Chicago, and in 1915 he refused to perform needed surgery for children born with severe birth defects and allowed them to die, in an act of eugenics. Children he denied surgery included John Bollinger, the child of Mr. and Mrs. Julius Werder, the child of William and Eva Meter, and Paul Hodzima. All except Paul Hodzima are known to have died due to lack of medical treatment; Paul's fate is unknown (in addition to lack of medical treatment, Haiselden prescribed a narcotic to ease and speed Paul's death, but Paul's mother stopped administering the drugs, being under pressure from the public to stop.) Eventually the Chicago Medical Society threatened Haiselden with expulsion for his decision to allow John Bollinger to die. He was acquitted by a trial jury, but eventually thrown out of practice by the Chicago Medical Board for his lecture series on eugenics and shameless promotion of The Black Stork, a 1917 silent movie that dramatized the events of the Bollinger case.
- 1918 - The first Cleveland Cripple Survey was published; one of the first accurate disability censuses, that measured the social and economic conditions of individuals considered.
- 1918 – The Smith-Sears Veterans Rehabilitation Act became law, and provided for the promotion of vocational rehabilitation and return to civil employment of disabled persons discharged from the U.S. military.
- 1920s: Psychiatrist Henry Cotton worked at Trenton State Hospital in New Jersey. He became convinced that insanity was fundamentally a toxic disorder and in the 1920s he surgically removed body parts to try to improve mental health. This often began with the removal of teeth and tonsils:

An 18-year-old girl with agitated depression successively had her upper and lower molars extracted, a tonsillectomy, sinus drainage, treatment for an infected cervix, removal of intestinal adhesions—all without effecting improvement in her psychiatric condition. Then the remainder of her teeth were removed and she was sent home, pronounced cured.

Andrew Scull argues that Cotton's obsession with focal sepsis as the root cause of mental illness "persisted in spite of all evidence to the contrary and the frightening incidence of death and harm from the operations he initiated". Cotton's approach attracted some detractors, but the medical establishment of the day did not effectively renounce or discipline him.

- 1924 – The Virginia Sterilization Act of 1924 provided for compulsory sterilization of persons deemed to be "feeble-minded," including the "insane, idiotic, imbecile, or epileptic." This Sterilization Act was upheld by the U.S. Supreme Court in the case Buck v. Bell 274 U.S. 200 (1927). In 1979, Virginia's Assembly repealed the Act. In 2001, the legislature overwhelmingly passed a bill (HJ607ER) to express the assembly's profound regret for its role in the eugenics movement. On May 2, 2002, Governor Mark R. Warner issued a statement also expressing "profound regret for the commonwealth's role in the eugenics movement," specifically naming Virginia's 1924 compulsory sterilization legislation, which includes though is not limited to the Virginia Sterilization Act of 1924.
- 1927 – Buck v. Bell, 274 U.S. 200 (1927), is a decision of the United States Supreme Court, written by Justice Oliver Wendell Holmes Jr., in which the Court ruled that a state statute permitting compulsory sterilization of the unfit, including the intellectually disabled, "for the protection and health of the state" did not violate the Due Process clause of the Fourteenth Amendment to the United States Constitution. The decision was largely seen as an endorsement of negative eugenics—the attempt to improve the human race by eliminating "defectives" from the gene pool. The Supreme Court has never expressly overturned Buck v. Bell.
- 1931 – The Pratt–Smoot Act became law. The act provided $100,000, to be administered by the Library of Congress, to provide blind adults with books. The program, which is known as Books for the Blind, has been heavily amended and expanded over the years, and remains in place today.
- 1933–1945 – The White House became one of the first wheelchair-accessible government buildings in Washington when modifications were made during the presidency of Franklin D. Roosevelt, who used a wheelchair because of his paralytic illness.
- 1935 – The League of the Physically Handicapped in New York City was formed in May 1935 to protest discrimination by the Works Progress Administration.
- 1935 – The Social Security Act became U.S. law; it provided federally funded old-age benefits and funds to states for assistance to blind individuals and disabled children. The Act also extended existing vocational rehabilitation programs.
- 1936 – The Randolph-Sheppard Act, 20 U.S.C. § 107 et seq., a federal law which mandates a priority to blind persons to operate vending facilities on federal property, became law in the U.S. It was amended and updated significantly in 1974.
- 1937 - 1960: A 1937 U.S. policy titled "Law 116" stated that, in the U.S. territory of Puerto Rico, those who were "feeble-minded" and "diseased" could be permanently sterilized. Lawmakers believed that these individuals were inept in making decisions about their reproductive abilities. They also did not want the mentally ill to pass on their genetic traits to their offspring. The United States used this reasoning as justification for the sterilizations previously performed as well as for future sterilization procedures. Law 116 was repealed in 1960.
- 1938 – The Wagner-O'Day Act, enacted in 1938, mandated that U.S. federal agencies purchase products from workshops for the blind meeting specific qualifications.

== 1940s ==
- 1940s - Kalamazoo, Michigan installed curb cuts in the 1940s as a pilot project to aid employment of veterans with disabilities.
- 1940 – The National Federation of the Blind was formed in Wilkes-Barre, Pennsylvania, by Jacobus Broek and others. They advocated for white cane laws, input by blind people for programs for blind clients and other reforms.
- 1940 – The American Federation of the Physically Handicapped, founded in 1940 by Paul Strachan, was the first cross-disability national political organization to urge an end to job discrimination, lobby for passage of related legislation, and call for a National Employ the Physically Handicapped Week, as well as other initiatives.
- 1943 – The La Follette-Barden Vocational Rehabilitation Act became law in the U.S., and it added physical rehabilitation to the goals of federally funded vocational rehabilitation programs and provided funding for certain care services.
- 1945 – PL-176 became law in the U.S., and it declared the first week in October each year would be National Employ the Physically Handicapped Week. In 1962 the word "physically" was removed to acknowledge the employment needs and contributions of individuals with all types of disabilities. In 1988, Congress expanded the week to a month (October) and changed the name to "National Disability Employment Awareness Month".
- 1946 – President Truman signed the National Mental Health Act (1946), which called for the establishment of a National Institute of Mental Health.
- 1946 – The Hill-Burton Act (also known as the Hospital Survey and Construction Act) became law in the U.S., and it authorized federal grants to states for the construction of hospitals, public centers and health facilities for rehabilitation of people with disabilities.
- 1946 – The National Mental Health Foundation was founded by American conscientious objectors from WWII who served as attendants at state mental institutions rather than serving in the war. The Foundation exposed the abusive conditions at these facilities and became an impetus toward deinstitutionalization.
- 1946 – The Paralyzed Veterans of America organization was created.
- 1946–1953: From 1946 to 1953, researchers from Quaker Oats Company, MIT and Harvard University carried out experiments at the Walter E. Fernald State School to determine how the minerals from cereals were metabolized. Parents of mentally disabled children were asked for permission to let their children be members of a Science Club and participate in research. Being a member of the Science Club gave the children special privileges. The parents were told that the children would be fed with a diet high in nutrients. However, they were not told (and the consent form contained no information indicating) that the food their children were fed contained radioactive calcium and iron. The information obtained from the experiments was to be used as part of an advertising campaign. The company was later sued because of the experiments. The lawsuit was settled on 31 December 1997.
- 1947 – The President's Committee on National Employ the Physically Handicapped Week was held in Washington, D.C. Publicity campaigns, coordinated by state and local committees, emphasized the competence of people with disabilities and used movie trailers, billboards, radio and television ads to convince the public that it was good business to hire disabled people.
- 1948 – The National Paraplegia Foundation, founded by members of the Paralyzed Veterans of America as the civilian arm of their growing movement, took a leading role in advocating for disability rights.
- 1948 – The University of Illinois at Galesburg disabled students' program was officially founded, and was directed by Timothy Nugent. The program moved to the campus at Urbana-Champaign where it became a prototype for disabled student programs and independent living centers across the country.
- 1948 – We Are Not Alone (WANA), a mental patients' self-help group, was organized at the Rockland State Hospital in Rockland County, New York.
- 1949 – Mental Health Awareness Month (also referred to as "Mental Health Month") has been observed in May in the United States since 1949. Mental Health Awareness Month was started in the United States in 1949 by the Mental Health America organization (then known as the National Association for Mental Health).

== 1950s ==
- 1950 – Mary Switzer was appointed the Director of the U.S. Office of Vocational Rehabilitation, where she emphasized independent living as a quality of life issue.
- 1950 – Social Security Amendments established a federal-state program to aid permanently and totally disabled persons in America.
- 1953 – The President's Committee on National Employ the Physically Handicapped Week became the President's Committee on Employment of the Physically Handicapped, a permanent organization reporting to the President and Congress.
- 1954 – Public Law 565 amended the Vocational Rehabilitation Act; specifically, it increased the 50–50 matched funding from the federal government to 3 federal dollars for every 2 state dollars, and expanded services to those with intellectual disabilities.
- 1954 – Mary Switzer, Director of the U.S. Office of Vocational Rehabilitation, authorized funds for more than 100 university-based rehabilitation-related programs.
- 1954 – The Social Security Act of 1935 was amended by PL 83-761 to include a freeze provision for workers who were forced by disability to leave the workforce. This protected their benefits by freezing their retirement benefits at their pre-disability level.
- 1954 – Durham v. United States, 214 F.2d 862 (D.C. Cir. 1954), is a criminal case articulating what became known as the Durham rule for juries to find a defendant is not guilty by reason of insanity, that "an accused is not criminally responsible if his unlawful act was the product of mental disease or mental defect". It was to enable psychiatrists to "inform the jury of the character of [the defendant's mental disease" so that a jury could be "guided by wider horizons of knowledge concerning mental life"; so that juries could make determinations based on expert testimony about the disease. It was patterned on State v. Pike. It was adopted by only two states, for a short time, but has and continues to be influential on debate over legal insanity. The decision was criticized for leaving a jury with no standard to judge impairment of reason or control, did not define mental disease, and left the jury dependent on expert testimony.
- 1956 – The Social Security Amendments of 1956 created the Social Security Disability (SSDI) program for disabled workers aged 50 to 64 in America.
- 1956 – The Alaska Mental Health Enabling Act of 1956 (Public Law 84-830) was an Act of Congress passed to improve mental health care in the United States territory of Alaska. The Act succeeded in its initial aim of establishing a mental health care system for Alaska, funded by income from lands allocated to a mental health trust. However, during the 1970s and early 1980s, Alaskan politicians systematically stripped the trust of its lands, transferring the most valuable land to private individuals and state agencies. The asset stripping was eventually ruled to be illegal following several years of litigation, and a reconstituted mental health trust was established in the mid-1980s.
- 1958 – The Social Security Amendments of 1958 extended Social Security Disability benefits to dependents of disabled workers in America.
- 1958 – PL 85-905, which authorized loan services for captioned films for the deaf, became law in the U.S.
- 1958 – PL 85-926, which provided federal support for training teachers for children with intellectual disability, became law in the U.S.
- 1958 – The Rehabilitation Gazette (formerly known as the Toomeyville Gazette), edited by Gini Laurie, was founded. It was an American grassroots publication which became an early voice for disability rights, independent living, and cross-disability organizing. It featured articles by writers with disabilities.

== 1960s ==
- 1937 - 1960: A 1937 U.S. policy titled "Law 116" stated that, in the U.S. territory of Puerto Rico, those who were "feeble-minded" and "diseased" could be permanently sterilized. Lawmakers believed that these individuals were inept in making decisions about their reproductive abilities. They also did not want the mentally ill to pass on their genetic traits to their offspring. The United States used this reasoning as justification for the sterilizations previously performed as well as for future sterilization procedures. Law 116 was repealed in 1960.
- 1960 – The National Association for Down Syndrome (originally incorporated as the Mongoloid Development Council), the oldest Down syndrome parent organization in the States, was founded by Kathryn McGee, whose daughter Tricia had Down syndrome.
- 1960 – The Social Security Amendments of 1960 eliminated the restriction that disabled workers receiving Social Security Disability benefits must be 50 or older.
- 1960 – Morton Birnbaum's seminal paper on "The Right To Treatment" appeared in 1960 in the American Bar Association Journal, marking the first published use of the term sanism in reference to the mentally ill.
- 1960 – Dusky v. United States, 362 U.S. 402 (1960), was a landmark United States Supreme Court case in which the Court affirmed a defendant's right to have a competency evaluation before proceeding to trial. This case set the current standard for adjudicative competence in the United States. Although the statutes addressing competency vary from state to state in the United States, the two elements outlined in the Dusky v. United States decision are held in common: The defendant must understand the charges against him or her and must have the ability to aid his or her attorney in his or her own defense, although see Felthous (2011), who argues that many state statutes—and the federal statute—do not incorporate the rationality standard enunciated in Dusky).
- 1961 – U.S. President John F. Kennedy appointed a President's Panel on Mental Retardation.
- 1961 – The American National Standard Institute, Inc. (ANSI) published American Standard Specifications for Making Buildings Accessible to, and Usable by, the Physically Handicapped (the A117.1 Barrier Free Standard). This landmark document, produced by the University of Illinois, became the basis for subsequent architectural access codes.
- 1962 – The President's Committee on Employment of the Physically Handicapped was renamed the President's Committee on Employment of the Handicapped, reflecting increased interest in employment issues affecting people with cognitive disabilities and mental illness.
- 1962 – Edward Roberts successfully sued to gain admission to the University of California, Berkeley, making him the first student with severe disabilities to attend that school.
- 1963 – Public Law 88-164, also called the Community Mental Health Act, became law in the U.S., and it authorized funding for developmental research centers in university affiliated facilities and community facilities for people with intellectual disability; it was the first federal law directed to help people with developmental disabilities.
- 1963 – U.S. President John F. Kennedy called for a reduction "over a number of years and by hundreds of thousands, (in the number) of persons confined" to residential institutions and asked that methods be found "to retain in and return to the community the mentally ill and mentally retarded, and thereto restore and revitalize their lives through better health programs and strengthened educational and rehabilitation services." This resulted in deinstitutionalization and increased community services.
- 1963 – South Carolina passed the first statewide architectural access code in America.
- 1964 – On October 6, 1964, a joint resolution of the U.S. Congress, H.R. 753 was signed into law as Pub. L. 88–628, and codified at 36 U.S.C. § 142. This resolution authorized the President of the United States to proclaim October 15 of each year as "White Cane Safety Day". President Lyndon B. Johnson signed the first White Cane Safety Day proclamation within hours of the passage of the joint resolution.
- 1965 – Medicare and Medicaid were established through passage of the Social Security Amendments of 1965, providing federally subsidized health care to disabled and elderly Americans covered by the Social Security program. These amendments changed the definition of disability under Social Security Disability program from "of long continued and indefinite duration" to "expected to last for not less than 12 months."
- 1965 – The Vocational Rehabilitation Amendments of 1965 were passed authorizing federal funds for construction of rehabilitation centers, expansion of existing vocational rehabilitation programs and the creation of the National Commission on Architectural Barriers to Rehabilitation of the Handicapped.
- 1965 – The National Technical Institute for the Deaf at the Rochester Institute of Technology in Rochester, New York, was established by the U.S. Congress.
- 1965 – The Voting Rights Act of 1965 became law in the U.S., and in addition to providing sweeping protections for minority voting rights, it allowed those with various disabilities to receive assistance "by a person of the voter's choice", as long as that person was not the disabled voter's boss or union agent.
- 1966 – In Pate v. Robinson, the Supreme Court of the United States ruled that a hearing about competency to stand trial is required under the due process clause of the Constitution of the United States.
- 1966 – In Rouse v. Cameron, 373 F.2d 451 (D.C. Cir. 1966), Charles Rouse had been tried for carrying a weapon without a license, and was found not guilty by reason of insanity and committed without a hearing to St. Elizabeth's Hospital in Washington, D.C. The maximum sentence was one year on the criminal charge. Years later, still in the hospital, Rouse filed a petition for habeas corpus challenging his confinement. Judge David Bazelon, writing for the court in Rouse, became the first appellate judge to say that civilly committed mental patients had a "right to treatment."
- 1966 – The President's Committee on Mental Retardation was established by U.S. President Lyndon B. Johnson.
- 1966 – "Christmas in Purgatory," by Burton Blatt and Fred Kaplan, was published; it documented conditions at American state institutions for people with developmental disabilities.
- 1967 – The Lanterman–Petris–Short (LPS) Act (Chapter 1667 of the 1967 California Statutes, codified as Cal. Welf & Inst. Code, sec. 5000 et seq.) regulates involuntary civil commitment to a mental health institution in the state of California. The Act set the precedent for modern mental health commitment procedures in the United States. It went into full effect on July 1, 1972. The Act in effect ended all hospital commitments by the judiciary system, except in the case of criminal sentencing, e.g., convicted sexual offenders, and those who were "gravely disabled", defined as unable to obtain food, clothing, or housing.
- 1967 – The Twenty-fifth Amendment to the United States Constitution dealing with issues related to presidential succession and disability is ratified. It clarifies that the vice president becomes president (as opposed to acting president) if the president dies, resigns, or is removed from office; and establishes procedures for filling a vacancy in the office of the vice president and for responding to presidential disabilities. The Twenty-fifth Amendment was submitted to the states on July 6, 1965, by the 89th Congress and was adopted on February 10, 1967.
- 1968 – The Architectural Barriers Act became law in the U.S., and required all federally owned or leased buildings to be accessible to disabled people. Among other things, it required provision of disabled-access toilet facilities.
- 1968 - When a rehabilitation counselor threatened two of the Rolling Quads of the University of California, Berkeley with eviction from the Cowell Residence, the Rolling Quads organized a successful "revolt" that led to the counselor's transfer.
- 1968 – The California legislature guaranteed that the Bay Area Rapid Transit (BART) would be the first rapid transit system in the U.S. to accommodate wheelchair users.
- 1969 – Wolf Wolfensberger's seminal work The Origin and Nature of Our Institutional Models was published. This book posited that society characterizes people with disabilities as deviant, sub-human and burdens of charity, resulting in the adoption of that "deviant" role.
- 1969 - The Federal Coal Mine Health and Safety Act of 1969 provided compensation for miners who were totally and permanently disabled by the progressive respiratory disease caused by the inhalation of fine coal dust - pneumoconiosis or "black lung".
- Before the 1970s – Before the 1970s, several US states had banned the procedure of lobotomy.

== 1970s ==
- 1970 - In 1970, while living in a nursing home, Max Starkloff founded Paraquad. The goal of the company was to help people with disabilities live independently.
- 1970 – The Urban Mass Transportation Act became law, and it required all new American mass transit vehicles be equipped with wheelchair lifts. APTA delayed implementation for 20 years. Regulations were finally issued in 1990.
- 1970 – Disabled in Action was founded by Judith Heumann and her friends Denise McQuade, Bobbi Linn, Frieda Tankas, Fred Francis, Pat Figueroa, possibly Larry Weissberger, Susan Marcus, Jimmy Lynch and Roni Stier (all of whom were disabled). A number of chapters were also started in various other American cities.
- 1970 – The American Association for the Abolition of Involuntary Mental Hospitalization (AAAIMH) was an organization founded in 1970 by Thomas Szasz, George Alexander, and Erving Goffman for the purpose of abolishing involuntary psychiatric intervention, particularly involuntary commitment, against individuals. The founding of the AAAIMH was announced by Szasz in 1971 in the American Journal of Public Health and American Journal of Psychiatry. The association provided legal help to psychiatric patients and published a journal, The Abolitionist. The organization was dissolved in 1980.
- 1970 – The Rolling Quads organization was started by Edward Roberts at UC Berkeley in California.
- 1970 – Developmental Disabilities Services and Facilities Construction Amendments became law in the U.S. These Amendments contained the first legal definition of developmental disabilities. They also authorized grants for services and facilities for the rehabilitation of people with developmental disabilities and state DD Councils.
- 1970 – The Physically Disabled Students Program (PDSP) was founded by Edward Roberts, John Hessler, Hale Zukas, and others at UC Berkeley. With its focus on community living, political advocacy and personal assistance services, it became the nucleus for the first Center for Independent Living, founded in 1972.
- 1971 – The Javits–Wagner–O'Day Act, 41 U.S.C. § 46 et seq., a U.S. federal law requiring that all federal agencies purchase specified supplies and services from nonprofit agencies employing persons who are blind or have other significant disabilities, was passed by the 92nd United States Congress in 1971. It was an expansion of the Wagner-O'Day Act of 1938 (see above).
- 1971 – The American National Standards Institute (ANSI) published American Standard Specifications for Making Buildings Accessible to, and Usable by, the Physically Handicapped (the A117.1 Barrier Free Standard). This landmark document, produced by the University of Illinois, became the basis for subsequent architectural access codes.
- 1971 – The National Center for Law and the Handicapped was founded at the University of Notre Dame, Indiana. It became the first legal advocacy center for people with disabilities in the U. S.
- 1971 – The U.S. District Court, Middle District of Alabama, decided in Wyatt v. Stickney that people in residential state schools and institutions had a constitutional right "to receive such individual treatment as (would) give them a realistic opportunity to be cured or to improve his or her mental condition." Disabled people were no longer to be locked away in custodial institutions without treatment or education.
- 1971 – The Mental Patients' Liberation Project was initiated in New York City.
- 1971 – The Fair Labor Standards Act of 1938 was amended to bring people with disabilities (other than blindness) into the sheltered workshop system.
- 1971 – Richardson v. Perales, 402 U.S. 389 (1971), was a case heard by the United States Supreme Court to determine and delineate several questions concerning administrative procedure in Social Security disability cases. In the case the Supreme Court ruled that: 1.) Written reports submitted by physicians in the treatment and evaluation of patients are admissible, and should be considered substantial evidence in disability hearings under the Social Security Act, even though by their nature, they are 'hearsay." 2.) Hearsay evidence is admissible up to the point of relevancy in such hearings. 3.) Subpoena of witnesses is within the jurisdiction and allowable under the rules of procedure in Social Security disability hearings. 4.) Reliance on "stacked hearsay" – where written records are reviewed by others who have not examined the patient, but issue reports based on their review, which then are followed by more generation of reports by individuals who have reviewed the record – should be discouraged. 5.) It is within the jurisdiction of administrative law judges to hire outside case consultants or advisors to review the issues of the case and offer reports and testimony in the furtherance of resolution. This is a practice that is advisable, in particular in those cases where the medical records and testimony are conflicting, or the medical issues are not clear. 6.) The Social Security Act is to be interpreted liberally in favor of the claimant. 7.) Social Security disability is different from welfare entitlements and does not require the same level of due process protections under the Fourteenth Amendment of the United States Constitution as the court delineated in Goldberg v. Kelly.
- 1971 – The Florida Mental Health Act of 1971 (Florida Statute 394.451–394.47891 (2009 rev.)), commonly known as the "Baker Act," allows the involuntary institutionalization and examination of an individual in Florida. The Baker Act allows for involuntary examination (what some call emergency or involuntary commitment). It can be initiated by judges, law enforcement officials, physicians, or mental health professionals. There must be evidence that the person:
- possibly has a mental illness (as defined in the Baker Act).
- is a harm to self, harm to others, or self neglectful (as defined in the Baker Act).

There must be evidence of recent behavior to justify the substantial likelihood of serious bodily harm in the near future. Moments in the past, when an individual may have considered harming themselves or another, do not qualify the individual as meeting the criteria. ("Near" means close, short, or draws near.) Examinations may last up to 72 hours after a person is deemed medically stable and occur in over 100 Florida Department of Children and Families-designated receiving facilities statewide. There are many possible outcomes following examination of the patient. This includes the release of the individual to the community (or other community placement), a petition for involuntary inpatient placement (what some call civil commitment), involuntary outpatient placement (what some call outpatient commitment or assisted treatment orders), or voluntary treatment (if the person is competent to consent to voluntary treatment and consents to voluntary treatment). The involuntary outpatient placement language in the Baker Act took effect as part of the Baker Act reform in 2005.

- 1971 – In Pennsylvania Association for Retarded Citizens (PARC) v. Commonwealth of Pennsylvania, 334 F. Supp. 1257 (E.D. Pa. 1971) the U.S. District Court, Eastern District of Pennsylvania, ruled that it was the obligation of the state of Pennsylvania to provide free public education to mentally disabled children, which it was not doing at that time. This decision struck down various state laws used to exclude disabled children from the public schools. Advocates cited this decision during public hearings that led to the passage of the Education for All Handicapped Children Act of 1975.
- 1972 – The Oregon Court of Appeals upheld the sterilization of a seventeen-year-old mentally ill girl with a history of sexual and physical abuse by her family. The Court based its decision on the recommendation of the State Board of Social Protection and the testimony of a psychiatrist who stated that the patient would never be able to provide parental guidance and judgment, saying, "she would never be able to provide the parental guidance and judgment which a child requires even though she might be able to master the skills necessary to take physical care of herself and a child." The psychiatrist "based this conclusion on the girl's lack of emotional control, her consistent low scores in areas of judgment on psychological tests, and the likelihood that she would abuse a child."
- 1972 – United States v. Brawner, 471 F.2d 969 (D.C. Cir. 1972), is a decision by the United States Court of Appeals for the District of Columbia Circuit in which the Court held that a person is not responsible for criminal conduct if at the time of such conduct as a result of mental disease or defect, he lacked substantial capacity either to appreciate the criminality of his conduct or conform his conduct to the requirements of the law. The case relied on the Durham rule for determining whether a defendant was not guilty by reason of insanity. The Court ruled that the primary reason they were departing from the old test of insanity is that it put substantial dominance on the testimony of experts. The Court exhaustively examined the justification for the defense of insanity and the need to guide the jury with a specific framework for the insanity defense. The American Law Institute provided a better framework in the majority's opinion because it took part of the reliance on experts away and focused on the acts and mental state of a defendant at the time he committed the acts constituting the crime. It proposed a rule that was adopted as the American Law Institute Model Penal Code rule (ALI rule).
- 1972 – The Center for Independent Living was established by Edward Roberts and associates in Berkeley, California. It was established with funds from the Rehabilitation Administration, and it is recognized as the first center for independent living. This sparked the Independent Living Movement.
- 1972 – Mills v. Board of Education of District of Columbia, 348 F.Supp. 866 (D.D.C. 1972), was a lawsuit filed against the District of Columbia in the United States District Court for the District of Columbia. The court ruled that students with disabilities must be given a public education even if the students are unable to pay for the cost of the education. The case established that "all children are entitled to free public education and training appropriate to their learning capacities". Peter D. Roos, a former staff attorney at Harvard University's Center for Law and Education, described Mills as a "leading case" in a series of lawsuits that attempted to provide access to education for children with disabilities.
- 1972 – The Houston Cooperative Living Residential Project was established in Houston, Texas. It became a model for subsequent independent living programs.
- 1972 – The Judge David L. Bazelon Center for Mental Health Law, founded in Washington, D.C., provided legal representation and advocated for the rights of people with mental illness.
- 1972 – The Legal Action Center (Washington, D.C. and New York City) was founded to advocate for the interests of people with alcohol or drug dependencies and for people with HIV/AIDS.
- 1972 – Paralyzed Veterans of America, National Paraplegia Foundation, and Richard Heddinger filed suit against the Washington Metropolitan Area Transit Authority, asking them to incorporate accessibility into their design for a new, multibillion-dollar subway system in Washington, D.C. Their victory was a landmark in the struggle for accessible public mass transit.
- 1972 – The Network Against Psychiatric Assault was organized in San Francisco.
- 1972 – In New York ARC v. Rockefeller, parents of 5,000 residents at the Willowbrook State School in Staten Island, New York, filed suit over the inhumane living conditions at that institution, where residents were abused and neglected. A 1972 television broadcast from the Willowbrook State School, titled "Willowbrook: The Last Great Disgrace," outraged the general public. However, it took 3 years from the time the lawsuit documents were filed before the consent judgement was signed. In 1975, the consent judgement was signed, and it committed New York state to improve community placement for the now designated "Willowbrook Class." The Willowbrook State School was closed in 1987, and all but about 150 of the former Willowbrook residents were moved to group homes by 1992.
- 1972 – An early version of the Rehabilitation Act of 1973 was vetoed by President Richard Nixon in October 1972.
- 1972 – Demonstrations were held by disabled activists in Washington, D.C. to protest Nixon's veto of an early version of the Rehabilitation Act of 1973. Among the demonstrators were Disabled in Action, Paralyzed Veterans of America, the National Paraplegia Foundation, and others.
- 1972 – Disabled in Action demonstrated in New York City with a sit-in protesting Nixon's veto of an early version of the Rehabilitation Act of 1973. Led by Judith Heumann, eighty activists staged this sit-in on Madison Avenue, stopping traffic.
- 1972 – The Commonwealth of Virginia ceased its sterilization program. 8,300 individuals never received justice regarding their sterilizations, which they did not consent to.
- 1972 – In Jackson v. Indiana, the U.S. Supreme Court ruled that a person adjudicated incompetent could not be indefinitely committed.
- 1972 - The Black Lung Benefits Act of 1972 (BLBA) is a federal law which provides monthly payments and medical benefits to coal miners totally disabled from pneumoconiosis (black lung disease) arising from employment in or around the nation's coal mines. The law also provides monthly benefits to a miner's dependent survivors if pneumoconiosis caused or hastened the miner's death.
- 1973 – An early version of the Rehabilitation Act of 1973 was vetoed by President Richard Nixon in March 1973.
- 1973 – The Rehabilitation Act of 1973 became law; Section 504 of the Act states "No otherwise qualified handicapped individual in the United States, shall, solely by reason of his [sic] handicap, be excluded from the participation in, be denied the benefits of, or be subjected to discrimination under any program or activity receiving federal financial assistance." The Rehabilitation Act of 1973 (Pub. L. 93–112, 87 Stat. 355, enacted September 26, 1973), is a federal law, codified as 29 U.S.C. § 701 et seq., that exists to extend and revise the authorization of grants to states for vocational rehabilitation services, with special emphasis on services to those with the most severe disabilities, to expand special federal responsibilities and research and training programs with respect to individuals with disabilities, to establish special responsibilities in the Secretary of Health, Education, and Welfare for coordination of all programs with respect to individuals with disabilities within the Department of Health, Education, and Welfare, and for other purposes. The Rehabilitation Act requires affirmative action in employment by the federal government and by government contractors and prohibits discrimination on the basis of disability in programs conducted by federal agencies, in programs receiving federal financial assistance, in federal employment, and in the employment practices of federal contractors. The standards for determining employment discrimination under the Rehabilitation Act are the same as those used in title I of the Americans with Disabilities Act.
- 1973 – In the case Sieling v. Eyman the U.S. Court of Appeals for the Ninth Circuit held that a criminal defendant may not have their plea of guilty accepted by a court if they have been found competent to stand trial unless they have also been found competent to waive their constitutional rights as required in a guilty plea.
- 1973 - The United States Access Board (also known as the Architectural and Transportation Barriers Compliance Board) is an independent agency of the United States government devoted to accessibility for people with disabilities. The Board was created in 1973 to ensure access to federally funded facilities.
- 1973 – The Goldwater rule is the informal name given to Section 7.3 in the American Psychiatric Association's code of ethics, which states it is unethical for psychiatrists to give a professional opinion about public figures they have not examined in person, and from whom they have not obtained consent to discuss their mental health in public statements. It is named after presidential candidate Barry Goldwater. Section 7.3, which appeared in the first edition of the APA's code of ethics in 1973 and is still in effect as of 2017, says:

On occasion psychiatrists are asked for an opinion about an individual who is in the light of public attention or who has disclosed information about himself/herself through public media. In such circumstances, a psychiatrist may share with the public his or her expertise about psychiatric issues in general. However, it is unethical for a psychiatrist to offer a professional opinion unless he or she has conducted an examination and has been granted proper authorization for such a statement.

- 1973 – Rosenhan's experiment in 1973 "accelerated the movement to reform mental institutions and to deinstitutionalize as many mental patients as possible."
- 1973 – A federal district court ruled in Souder v. Brennan that patients in mental health institutions must be considered employees and paid the minimum wage required by the Fair Labor Standards Act of 1938 whenever they performed any activity that conferred an economic benefit on an institution. Following this ruling, institutional peonage was outlawed, as evidenced in Pennsylvania's Institutional Peonage Abolishment Act of 1973.
- 1973 – The American Bar Association's Commission on the Mentally Disabled was established in 1973 to respond to the advocacy needs of persons with mental disabilities. After the passage of the Americans with Disabilities Act of 1990, the ABA broadened the Commission's mission to serve all persons with disabilities and changed its name to the Commission on Mental and Physical Disability Law (CMPDL). In 2011, in order to better reflect the Commission's focus on both disability law and the rights of lawyers and law students with disabilities, it was renamed the Commission on Disability Rights. Its current mission as of 2015 is "to promote the ABA's commitment to justice and the rule of law for persons with mental, physical, and sensory disabilities and to promote their full and equal participation in the legal profession."
- 1973 – Handicapped parking stickers were introduced in Washington, D.C.
- 1973 – The first Conference on Human Rights and Psychiatric Oppression was held at the University of Detroit.
- 1973 – The Federal-Aid Highway Act authorized federal funds for construction of curb cuts.
- 1973 – The Architectural and Transportation Barriers Compliance Board, established under the Rehabilitation Act of 1973, enforced the Architectural Barriers Act of 1968.
- 1973 – The Consortium for Citizens with Disabilities advocated for passage of what became the Developmentally Disabled Assistance and Bill of Rights Act of 1975 and the Education for All Handicapped Children Act of 1975.
- 1973 – In December 1973 Leonard Roy Frank and Wade Hudson founded Network Against Psychiatric Assault (NAPA), a patients' and survivors' advocacy group.
- 1974 – Significant amendments were made to the Rehabilitation Act of 1973 in 1974. The most important change was the expansion of the definition of "handicapped individual." The original 1973 Act defined a "handicapped individual" as

any individual who (A) has a physical or mental disability which for such individual constitutes or results in a substantial handicap to employment and (B) can reasonably be expected to benefit in terms of employability from vocational rehabilitation services provided pursuant to titles I and III of this Act.

The 1974 amendments substituted a much broader definition of "handicapped individual" applicable to employment by the federal government (Section 501 of the Act), modification or elimination of architectural and transportation barriers (Section 502), employment by federal contractors (section 503) and to programs receiving federal financial assistance (Section 504) that was not related to employability through vocational rehabilitation services. The 1974 amendments clarified that a handicapped individual meant

any person who (A) has a physical or mental impairment which substantially limits one or more of such person's major life activities, (B) has a record of such an impairment, or (C) is regarded as having such an impairment.

Congress adopted that definition in the Americans with Disabilities Act of 1990, substituting the term "disability" for "handicapped."

- 1974 – Supplemental Security Income, a United States government program that provides stipends to low-income people who are either blind or otherwise disabled, or aged 65 or older was created in 1974 to replace federal-state adult assistance programs that served the same purpose. The restructuring of these programs was intended to standardize the eligibility requirements and level of benefits. The new federal program was incorporated into Title XVI (Title 16) of the Social Security Act.
- 1974 – The Vietnam Era Veterans' Readjustment Assistance Act of 1974 (or VEVRAA, 38 U.S.C. § 4212) is an Act of Congress in reference to disabled veterans, Vietnam-era veterans, and any other veterans who served active duty time in a war event that qualifies for a campaign badge. This law requires that employers with federal contracts or subcontracts of $150,000 or more provide equal opportunity and affirmative action for special disabled veterans, Vietnam-era veterans, and veterans who served on active duty during a war or in a campaign or expedition for which a campaign badge has been authorized.
- 1974 – The Disabled Women's Coalition was founded at the University of California, Berkeley, by Susan Sygall and Deborah Kaplan.
- 1974 – Indiana repealed all laws concerning sterilization of the mentally ill in 1974.
- 1974 – The last recorded American arrest related to an ugly law was in 1974, in regard to an Omaha, Nebraska ordinance. In that instance, the man arrested was homeless and the officer arresting him did so under the guise of the ugly law as the man had visible scars and marks on his body. The judge, Walter Cropper, and assistant prosecutor, Richard Epstein, in this case noted there was no legal definition for ugly and criminal prosecution would demand proving someone is ugly. The end result was the city prosecutor, Gary Bucchino, did not file charges noting while the law was still active, this person did not meet the definition.
- 1974 – The last ugly law was repealed, in Chicago, Illinois.
- 1974 – Although the U.S. Supreme Court had ruled in the 1927 Buck v. Bell case that the state of Virginia could sterilize those it thought unfit, Virginia repealed its sterilization law in 1974.
- 1974 – The Boston Center for Independent Living was established.
- 1974 – Halderman v. Pennhurst, filed in Pennsylvania on behalf of the residents of the Pennhurst State School and Hospital, highlighted conditions at state schools for people with intellectual disabilities. It became a precedent in the battle for deinstitutionalization, establishing a right to community services for people with developmental disabilities.
- 1974 – The first Client Assistant Project (CAP) was established to advocate for clients of state vocational rehabilitation agencies.
- 1974 – North Carolina passed a statewide building code with stringent access requirements. Drafted by access advocate Ronald Mace, the code became a model for effective architectural access legislation in other states.
- 1974 – North Carolina ended its forced sterilization program. The state sterilized 7,600 people from 1929 to 1974 who were deemed socially or mentally unfit.
- 1974 – Barrier Free Environments, founded by Ronald Mace, advocated for accessibility in American buildings and products.
- 1975 – The Education for All Handicapped Children Act, PL 94-142, (renamed the Individuals with Disabilities Education Act in 1990) became law in the U.S., and it declared that disabled children could not be excluded from public school because of their disability, and that school districts were required to provide special services to meet the needs of disabled children. The law also required that disabled children be taught in a setting that resembles as closely as possible the regular school program, while also meeting their special needs.
- 1975 – The Atlantis Community of Denver, Colorado, was founded by Wade Blank, who relocated adults with severe disabilities from a nursing home to apartments.
- 1975 – The Developmental Disabilities Assistance and Bill of Rights Act became law in the U.S., and it established protection and advocacy (P & A) services.
- 1975 – The Community Services Act became law in the U.S., and it created the Head Start Program. It stipulated that at least 10% of program openings were to be reserved for disabled children.
- 1975 – The Developmentally Disabled Assistance and Bill of Rights Act became law; it is a US law providing federal funds to Councils on Developmental Disabilities, Protection and Advocacy Systems, as well as University Centers. The law defined the relatively new term "developmental disability" to include specific conditions that originate prior to age 18, are expected to continue indefinitely, and that constitute a substantial handicap.
- 1975 – The American Coalition of Citizens with Disabilities was founded in Washington, D.C.. It became the leading national cross-disability rights organization of the 1970s.
- 1975 – The Association of Persons with Severe Handicaps (TASH) was founded by special education professionals in response to PARC v. Pennsylvania (1971) and other right-to-education cases. This organization called for the end of aversive behavior modification and the closing of all residential institutions for people with disabilities.
- 1975 – On February 19, 1975 the Texas Supreme Court's ruling in the case Jacobs v. Theimer made Texas the first state in America to declare a woman could sue her doctor for a wrongful birth. That case involved Dortha Jean Jacobs (later Dortha Biggs), who caught rubella while pregnant and gave birth to Lesli, who was severely disabled. Dortha and her husband sued her doctor, saying he did not diagnose the rubella or warn them how it would affect the pregnancy.
- 1975 – The U.S. Supreme Court ruled (in O'Connor v. Donaldson, 422 U.S. 563 (1975)) that a state cannot constitutionally confine, without more, a non-dangerous individual who is capable of surviving safely in freedom by themselves or with the help of willing and responsible family members or friends, and since the previous jury found, upon ample evidence, that petitioner did so confine respondent, it properly concluded that petitioner had violated respondent's right to liberty.
- 1975 – Parent and Training Information Centers were developed to help parents of children with disabilities exercise their rights under the Education for All Handicapped Children Act of 1975.
- 1975 – Edward Roberts was appointed Director of the California Department of Rehabilitation. He established nine independent living centers based on the Berkeley CIL model.
- 1975 – In Drope v. Missouri, the U.S. Supreme Court decided that when deciding whether to evaluate a criminal defendant's competency, the court must consider any evidence suggestive of mental illness, even one factor alone in some circumstances. Therefore, the threshold for obtaining a competency evaluation is low. When the issue is raised, the motion should be granted. The defendant must not bear all the burden for raising the issue.
- 1975 – The Western Center on Law and the Handicapped was founded in Los Angeles.
- 1975 – Board of Education of the Hendrick Hudson Central School District v. Rowley, 458 U.S. 176 (1982) is a United States Supreme Court case concerning the interpretation of the Education for All Handicapped Children Act of 1975. Amy Rowley was a deaf student, whose school refused to provide a sign language interpreter. Her parents filed suit contending violation of the Education for All Handicapped Children Act of 1975. In a 6–3 decision authored by Justice Rehnquist, the Court held that public schools are not required by law to provide sign language interpreters to deaf students who are otherwise receiving an equal and adequate education.
- 1975 - "No person shall be denied the equal protection of the laws. No law shall discriminate against a person because of race or religious ideas, beliefs, or affiliations. No law shall arbitrarily, capriciously, or unreasonably discriminate against a person because of birth, age, sex, culture, physical condition, or political ideas or affiliations." – Louisiana Constitution, Article I, §3 (1975).
- 1976 – The Higher Education Act of 1972 amendment provided services to physically disabled students entering college.
- 1976 – Tarasoff v. Regents of the University of California, 17 Cal. 3d 425, 551 P.2d 334, 131 Cal. Rptr. 14 (Cal. 1976), was a case in which the Supreme Court of California held that mental health professionals have a duty to protect individuals who are being threatened with bodily harm by a patient. The original 1974 decision mandated warning the threatened individual, but a 1976 rehearing of the case by the California Supreme Court called for a "duty to protect" the intended victim. The professional may discharge the duty in several ways, including notifying police, warning the intended victim, and/or taking other reasonable steps to protect the threatened individual.
- 1976 – Centers for independent living were established in Houston and Chicago.
- 1976 - Robert Randall successfully used a medical necessity defense when he was charged with illegal possession of cannabis to treat his glaucoma. The case, United States v. Randall (1976), is "The first successful articulation of the medical necessity defense in the history of the common law, and indeed, the first case to extend the necessity defense to the crimes of possession or cultivation of marijuana".
- 1976 – Karen Ann Quinlan became unconscious after she consumed diazepam along with alcohol while on a crash diet and lapsed into a coma, followed by a persistent vegetative state. After doctors, under threat from prosecutors, refused the request of her parents, Joseph and Julia Quinlan, to disconnect Quinlan's respirator, which the parents believed constituted extraordinary means of prolonging her life, her parents filed suit to disconnect Quinlan from her ventilator. Their request was denied by New Jersey Superior Court Judge Robert Muir Jr. in November 1975. Judge Muir cited that Quinlan's doctors did not support removing her from the ventilator, that whether or not to do so was a medical rather than a judicial decision, and that doing so would violate New Jersey homicide statutes. The Quinlans appealed the decision to the New Jersey Supreme Court. On March 31, 1976, the court granted their request, holding that the right to privacy was broad enough to encompass the Quinlans' request on Quinlan's behalf.
- 1976 – The Federal Communications Commission authorized reserving Line 21 on televisions for closed captions.
- 1976 – Disabled in Action of Pennsylvania, Inc. v. Coleman was known as the Transbus lawsuit. Disabled in Action of Pennsylvania, the American Coalition of Cerebral Palsy Associations and others were represented by The Public Interest Law Center of Philadelphia. They successfully filed suit to require that all buses purchased by public transit authorities receiving federal funds meet Transbus specifications (making them wheelchair accessible).
- 1976 – Celestine Tate Harrington, a street musician with quadriplegia, won the right to parent her daughter Nia, having proved to a judge that she could take care of Nia and therefore should not have to give her to the Philadelphia Department of Public Welfare because of her quadriplegia.
- 1976 – Disabled in Action picketed the United Cerebral Palsy telethon, calling telethons "demeaning and paternalistic shows which celebrate and encourage pity."
- 1976 – In the case Saddler v. United States, the Second Circuit Court ruled that sentencing has to be postponed if the judge has, "reasonable grounds to believe that the defendant may not have a level of awareness sufficient to understand the nature of the proceeding or to exercise his right of allocution."
- 1976 – The Disability Rights Center was founded in Washington, D.C. Sponsored by Ralph Nader's Center for the Study of Responsive Law, it specialized in consumer protection for people with disabilities.
- 1976 – The Westside Center for Independent Living, Los Angeles, was one of the first nine independent living centers established by Edward Roberts, Director of the California Department of Rehabilitation.
- 1976 – James L. Cherry and several members of the Action League for Physically Handicapped Adults (ALPHA) filed a lawsuit, known as Cherry v. Mathews, which was decided in their favor on July 19, 1976. U. S. District Court Judge John Lewis Smith ruled for them and ordered DHEW (the U.S. Dept. of Health, Education and Welfare) to develop the Section 504 regulation to prohibit discrimination against "handicapped persons" in any federally funded program. In January, 1977, Mathews (then the U.S. Secretary of Health, Education and Welfare) refused to sign the prepared regulation, and James Cherry and his co-plaintiffs went back to the U. S. District Court, where Mathews was held in contempt of court for refusing to follow the Cherry court order. Mathews was soon replaced by Joseph Califano due to Jimmy Carter being sworn in as President (see next entry in this timeline).
- 1977 – Initially Joseph Califano, U.S. Secretary of Health, Education and Welfare, refused to sign meaningful regulations for Section 504 of the Rehabilitation Act of 1973, which was the first U.S. federal civil rights protection for people with disabilities. After an ultimatum and deadline, demonstrations took place in ten U.S. cities on April 5, 1977, including the beginning of the 504 Sit-in at the San Francisco Office of the U.S. Department of Health, Education and Welfare. This sit-in, organized by Judith Heumann, Kitty Cone, and Mary Jane Owen lasted until May 4, 1977, a total of 28 days, with more than 150 people refusing to leave. It is the longest sit-in at a federal building to date. Joseph Califano signed the regulations on April 28, 1977.
- 1977 – Max Cleland was appointed head of the U.S. Veterans Administration. He was the first severely disabled person and the youngest person to fill that position.
- 1977 – Rules were changed, so that service dogs were allowed on the U.S. Senate floor.
- 1977 – The White House Conference on Handicapped Individuals drew 3,000 people with disabilities to discuss federal policy toward people with disabilities. It resulted in numerous recommendations and acted as a catalyst for grassroots disability rights organizing.
- 1977 – The Lanterman Developmental Disabilities Act (AB 846), also known as the Lanterman Act, is a California law, initially proposed by Assemblymember Frank D. Lanterman in 1973 and passed in 1977, that gives people with developmental disabilities the right to services and supports that enable them to live a more independent and normal life. The Lanterman Act declares that persons with developmental disabilities have the same legal rights and responsibilities guaranteed all other persons by federal and state constitutions and laws, and charges the regional center with advocacy for, and protection of, these rights.
- 1977 – Legal Services Corporation Act Amendments added financially needy people with disabilities to the list of those eligible for publicly funded legal services in America.
- 1977 – The US Congress, during the presidency of Jimmy Carter, created the National Committee for the Protection of Human Subjects of Biomedical and Behavioral Research to investigate allegations that psychosurgery—including lobotomy techniques—were used to control minorities and restrain individual rights. The committee concluded that some extremely limited and properly performed psychosurgery could have positive effects.
- 1977 – In Lloyd v. Regional Transportation Authority, the U.S. Court of Appeals, Seventh Circuit ruled that individuals have a right to sue under Section 504 of the Rehabilitation Act of 1973 and that public transit authorities must provide accessible service. However, the U.S. Court of Appeals, Fifth Circuit, in Snowden v. Birmingham Jefferson County Transit Authority undermined this decision by ruling that authorities need to provide access only to "handicapped persons other than those confined to wheelchairs."
- 1978 – On July 5 and 6 1978, a Denver intersection was the site of the first demonstration for wheelchair accessible public transportation when nineteen members of the Atlantis Community (known as the Gang of Nineteen) chanting "We Will Ride" blocked buses with their wheelchairs, staying in the streets all night.
- 1978 – Disability rights activists successfully protested the Denver Regional Transit Authority with a civil disobedience campaign because the transit system was inaccessible to people who used wheelchairs.
- 1978 – The Adaptive Environments Center was founded in Boston.
- 1978 – Title VII of the Rehabilitation Act Amendments of 1978 became law in the U.S., and it established the first federal funding for consumer-controlled independent living centers and created the National Council of the Handicapped under the U.S. Department of Education.
- 1978 – "On Our Own: Patient Controlled Alternatives to the Mental Health System", by Judi Chamberlin, was published; it became the standard text of the psychiatric survivor movement.
- 1978 – In Rennie v. Klein, the Federal District Court of New Jersey ruled that an involuntarily committed individual has a constitutional right to refuse psychotropic medication without a court order.
- 1978 - In 1971, Judge Harold D. Stump granted a mother's petition to have a tubal ligation performed on her 15-year-old daughter, who the mother alleged was "somewhat retarded". This led to Stump v. Sparkman, 435 U.S. 349 (1978), which is the leading United States Supreme Court decision on judicial immunity. It involved the then-grown daughter suing the judge because she had been sterilized without her knowledge as a minor in accordance with the judge's order. The Supreme Court held that the judge was immune from being sued for issuing the order because it was issued as a judicial function. The case has been called one of the most controversial in recent Supreme Court history.
- 1978 – The National Center for Law and the Deaf was founded in Washington, D.C.
- 1978 – Handicapping America, by Frank Bowe, was published; it was a comprehensive review of the policies and attitudes denying equal citizenship to Americans with disabilities. It became a standard text of the disability rights movement.
- 1978 – The Wage and Hour Act was amended in Alaska to exempt businesses from paying minimum wage to "an individual whose earning capacity is impaired by physical or mental deficiency, age, or injury." After the amending, employers were required to apply for a state waiver showing that the worker's physical or mental disability impaired their ability to do the job. Then the state labor commissioner would decide whether or not the person would be able to get a job that would pay the minimum wage. However, paying workers with disabilities less than the minimum wage was outlawed in Alaska in 2018.
- 1979 – Part B funds created ten new centers for independent living across the U.S.
- 1979 – Vermont Center for Independent Living, the first statewide independent living center in the U.S., was founded by representatives of Vermont disability groups.
- 1979 – The U.S. Supreme Court ruling in Addington v. Texas raised the burden of proof required to commit persons for psychiatric treatment from the usual civil burden of proof of "preponderance of the evidence" to the higher standard of "clear and convincing evidence".
- 1979 – In Southeastern Community College v. Davis, the U.S. Supreme Court ruled that under Section 504 of the Rehabilitation Act of 1973, programs receiving federal funds must make "reasonable modifications" to enable the participation of otherwise qualified disabled individuals. This decision was the Court's first ruling on Section 504 establishing reasonable modification as an important principle in disability rights law.
- 1979 – In Rogers v. Okin, the United States Court of Appeals for the First Circuit ruled that a competent patient committed to a psychiatric hospital has the right to refuse treatment in non-emergency situations.
- 1979 – The Disability Rights Education and Defense Fund (DREDF) was established in Berkeley, California. It conducts landmark litigation and lobbying.
- 1979 – Frendak v. United States, 408 A.2d 364 (D.C. 1979) is a landmark case in which the District of Columbia Court of Appeals decided that a judge could not impose an insanity defense over the defendant's objections.
- 1979 – The Virginia Sterilization Act of 1924 was repealed; it had provided for compulsory sterilization of persons deemed to be "feebleminded," including the "insane, idiotic, imbecile, or epileptic." It had been upheld by the U.S. Supreme Court in the case Buck v. Bell 274 U.S. 200 (1927).
- 1979 – In the case Parham v. J.R., 442 U.S. 584 (1979), the U.S. Supreme Court ruled that a parent or a guardian can commit a minor to a mental institution if a staff physician certifies that said minor should be committed, even if said minor is very much against this commitment. The Court specifically rejected the idea that such commitment without an adversary hearing is against due process of law.

== 1980s ==
- 1980 - Michael Rehak, a blind man, was refused entry to Man's Country/New York in 1978 by staff concerned that his blindness could constitute a safety risk in the event of a fire or other emergency. Rehak filed a complaint with the New York City Commission on Human Rights. Man's Country/New York settled the case in 1980, agreeing not to discriminate against blind individuals and awarding Rehak a cash payment.
- 1980 - The Disability Amendments Act of 1980 became law.
- 1980 – The National Disabled Women's Educational Equity Project, Berkeley, California, was established by Corbett O'Toole. Based at the Disability Rights Education and Defense Fund (DREDF), the Project administered the first national survey on disability and gender and conducted the first national Conference on Disabled Women's Educational Equity held in Bethesda, Maryland.
- 1980 – The Civil Rights of Institutionalized Persons Act authorized the U.S. Justice Department to file civil suits on behalf of residents of institutions whose rights were being violated.
- 1980 – The New Hampshire Supreme Court held that a probate court may approve a petition for the sterilization of an incompetent minor if a guardian ad litem is appointed to represent the minor and the court finds with clear and convincing evidence that the sterilization is in the best interest of the patient.
- 1980 – The New Jersey Supreme Court held that a mentally disabled woman has the right to be sterilized under the privacy rights of both the New Jersey and Federal Constitutions; however, the incompetent must be represented by counsel and the court may only authorize the sterilization if there is clear and convincing evidence the sterilization is in the person's best interest.
- 1980 – The mother of a mentally incompetent minor petitioned the court for an order authorizing the sterilization of the minor. The Washington Supreme Court held that the Washington Superior courts have authority under the Washington constitution to grant the sterilization; however, the mother failed to show with clear and convincing evidence the sterilization was in the best interest of the minor.
- 1980 – The American National Standard Institute, Inc. (ANSI) published American Standard Specifications for Making Buildings Accessible to, and Usable by, the Physically Handicapped (the A117.1 Barrier Free Standard). This landmark document, produced by the University of Illinois, became the basis for subsequent architectural access codes Uniform Federal Accessibility Standard 1984 and the Americans with Disabilities Act 1990.
- 1980 – The Mental Health Systems Act of 1980 (MHSA) was United States legislation signed by President Jimmy Carter which provided grants to community mental health centers. The Omnibus Budget Reconciliation Act of 1981, signed by President Ronald Reagan on August 13, 1981, repealed most of the MHSA. The Patients' Bill of Rights, section 501, was not repealed; per Congressional record, the Congress felt that state provisions were sufficient and section 501 served as a recommendation to states to review and refine existing policies.
- 1980 – The California Court of Appeal held in 1980 (in Curlender v. Bio-Science Laboratories, 165 Cal.Rptr. 477, 488 (Cal.App. 1980)) that "a reverent appreciation of life compels recognition that [a wrongful life] plaintiff, however impaired she may be, has come into existence as a living person with certain rights" – i.e. the right to recover against a doctor whose negligence resulted in her disease. The Curlender decision involved a child who was allegedly born with Tay–Sachs disease after the parents relied upon the defendants' representations about the reliability of their genetic tests in refraining from proceeding with amniocentesis. Curlender was not the first appellate decision to authorize a cause of action for wrongful life—it noted that a 1977 decision of the intermediate appellate court of New York had taken the same position, and was promptly overruled by the highest court of that state a year later. However, Curlender stands as the first such appellate decision which was not later overruled.
- 1981 – The Alaska Supreme Court held that an Alaskan Superior Court has the authority to order the sterilization of a mental incompetent upon petition by the incompetent's legal guardian if it is proven with clear and convincing evidence that sterilization is in the best interest of the incompetent.
- 1981 - New York City began using some wheelchair accessible buses.
- 1981 – The Colorado Supreme Court held that a district court may authorize the sterilization of a "mentally retarded person" if the court finds with clear and convincing evidence the procedure is medically essential. The Court defined "medically essential" as a procedure that is "clearly necessary, in the opinion of experts, to preserve the life or physical or mental health of the mentally retarded person.
- 1981 – Poe v. Lynchburg Training School and Hospital, Civ. A. No. 80-0172, 518 F. Supp. 789 (W.D. Va 1981) concerned whether or not patients who had been involuntarily sterilized in Lynchburg Training School and Hospital, a state mental institution in Virginia, as part of a program of eugenics in the early and mid-20th century had their constitutional rights violated. The case had been filed in 1980 by the American Civil Liberties Union's Reproductive Freedom Project on behalf of 8,000 women who had been sterilized under the program. The court ruled that the sterilization did not violate constitutional rights, and that though the statute on involuntary sterilization of "mental defectives" had since been repealed, it had previously been upheld as constitutional (in Buck v. Bell, 1927). However, the fact that state officials did not notify or provide subsequent medical services to the sterilized individuals was found to merit further consideration by the court. In a settlement reached in 1985, the state agreed to inform the women about what had been done to them and to help them get counseling and medical treatment.
- 1981 – The United Nations established this year as the International Year of Disabled Persons. At the conclusion of the year the UN called on member nations to establish in their own countries organizations for and about people with disabilities. Alan Reich, who headed the U.S. committee for the International Year, established the National Organization on Disability in response to this call.
- 1981 – Estelle v. Smith, 451 U.S. 454 (1981), was a United States Supreme Court case in which the Court held that, per Miranda v. Arizona (1966), the state may not force a defendant to submit to a psychiatric examination solely for the purposes of sentencing. Any such examination violates the defendant's Fifth Amendment rights against self-incrimination as well as the Sixth Amendment right to counsel, and is therefore inadmissible at sentencing.
- 1981 – In Tokarcik v. Forest Hills School District, 655 F.2d 443 (3rd Cir. 1981), the United States Court of Appeals, Third Circuit, ruled that denying a disabled child access to a regular public school classroom without a compelling education justification constituted discrimination.
- 1981 – Gini Laurie organized the first international conference on post-polio problems.
- 1981 - President Reagan ordered the Social Security Administration (SSA) to tighten up enforcement of the Disability Amendments Act of 1980, which resulted in more than a million disability beneficiaries having their benefits stopped.
- 1982 – A baby known as "Infant Doe" was born in Bloomington, Indiana, with Down syndrome and a birth defect, a tracheoesiphageal fistula, which prevented the oral ingestion of food and water, and would have required surgery. The parents refused the surgery with the advice of their physician, Dr. Walter L. Owens, as it was felt that even with successful corrective surgery, Infant Doe would not be able to attain a "minimally acceptable quality of life". Hospital officials had a guardian appointed by the Indiana Juvenile Court to determine whether the surgery should be done. The court ruled in favor of the parents (and thus against the surgery), and the Indiana Supreme Court refused to hear the case. The baby died later in 1982. Due to the baby's death there could be no appeal to the Supreme Court.
- 1982 - A Katie Beckett waiver or TEFRA waiver is a Medicaid waiver concerning the income eligibility for home-based Medicaid services for children under the age of nineteen. The waiver is also called a TEFRA waiver because it was passed as a provision of the Tax Equity and Fiscal Responsibility Act of 1982.
- 1982 – Under Title 34 B Chapter 7 of the Maine Revised Statutes, also known as the "Due Process in Sterilization Act of 1982," a hearing and a District Court order authorizing the sterilization is required if the sterilization is sought for "A. Persons under age 18 years and not married or otherwise emancipated; B. Persons presently under public or private guardianship or conservatorship; C. Persons residing in a state institution providing care, treatment or security, or otherwise in state custody; or D. Persons from whom a physician could not obtain informed consent." The hearing to determine the patient's ability to give informed consent requires at least two disinterested experts in developmental disabilities or mental health, including at least one psychologist or psychiatrist to examine the person to determine competency. If the court determines the person is not competent to give informed consent the court will appoint at least three disinterested experts to examine the person for the beneficial or detrimental effects of sterilization. The sterilization may be authorized if the court determines with clear and convincing evidence that the sterilization is in the best interests of the patient and other methods of contraception are inappropriate or unworkable for the person.
- 1982 – The Telecommunications for the Disabled Act became law in the U.S., and it mandated that public phones be accessible to the hearing impaired by Jan 1, 1985.
- 1982 – Youngberg v. Romeo, 457 U.S. 307 (1982), was a landmark United States Supreme Court case regarding the rights of the involuntarily committed and mentally retarded. Nicholas Romeo was intellectually disabled with an infant level IQ and was committed to a Pennsylvania state hospital. He was restrained for many hours of the day and repeatedly injured. The Supreme Court agreed with the Third Circuit Court of Appeals that involuntarily committed residents had the right to reasonably safe confinement conditions, no unreasonable body restraints and the habilitation they reasonably require.
- 1982 – In Board of Education v. Rowley, 458 U.S. 176 (2nd Circuit Court 1982), the 2nd Circuit Court in the U.S. found that individualized decisions based on the unique needs of each child were essential under federal law. Schools who let one criterion, such as a specific disability, automatically determine the placement are likely to be held in violation of federal law.
- 1982 – The Appeals Court of Massachusetts held that a court of general jurisdiction has the authority to hear a petition to sterilize an intellectually disabled person. The court stated that the court must use substituted consent to determine if the sterilization should be authorized, and "no sterilization is to be compelled on the basis of any State or parental interest."
- 1982 – In a 1982 case involving hereditary deafness, the Supreme Court of California was the first state supreme court to endorse the child's right to sue for wrongful life, but in the same decision, limited the child's recovery to special damages. This rule implies that the child can recover objectively provable economic damages, but cannot recover general damages like subjective "pain and suffering"—that is, monetary compensation for the entire experience of having a disabled life versus having a healthy mind and/or body.
- 1982 – The Maryland Court of Appeals held that circuit courts have the jurisdiction to hear a petition for the sterilization on an incompetent minor. The court may only approve of the petition for sterilization if it is proven with clear and convincing evidence that the "procedure is medically necessary to preserve the life or physical or mental health of the incompetent minor."
- 1982 – 1983: In 1982 a ban on the use of electroshock in Berkeley, California, was passed. However, in June 1983 Donald McCullom, an Alameda County Superior Court Judge, issued an injunction on the implementation of the ban. Initiative T. (the ban) was overturned shortly thereafter following a successful legal challenge initiated by the American Psychiatric Association, on the constitutionality of the measure.
- 1983 – The Indiana Supreme Court authorized for the sterilization of an intellectually disabled twelve-year-old girl who engaged in self-destructive behavior such as pulling her hair, biting herself, banging her head, ripping her skin with her fingernails, and resisting the "restraints in order to hurt her own body." The patient's parents and her doctors were both in agreement that a hysterectomy was necessary in order to prevent "hemorrhaging and infection, and possibly death" because the patient's excitement with her own blood may cause her "to induce bleeding by poking into her vagina or abdomen in an attempt to keep the blood flowing" once she develops her menstruation cycle. The Court held that a specific Indiana statute authorizing sterilization was not necessary in order to authorize the sterilization, the juvenile court had the authority to authorize sterilizations if there was clear and convincing evidence that the medical procedure was necessary, and in this case there was overwhelming evidence that the sterilization was medically necessary.
- 1983 – In Hawaii Department of Education v. Katherine D., the U.S. federal appeals court found "intermittent" nursing services, including care of a child's tracheostomy tube, to be not too burdensome for a school to provide to a student.
- 1983 – The Americans Disabled for Accessible Public Transit (ADAPT) organization was established in Denver, Colorado.
- 1983 – The New York Supreme Court authorized the sterilization of an incompetent person.
- 1983 – In Barefoot v. Estelle the United States Supreme Court held that there was no merit to the petitioner's argument that psychiatrists, individually and as a group, were incompetent to predict with an acceptable degree of reliability that a particular criminal would commit other crimes in the future, and so represent a danger to the community.
- 1983 – The National Council on Independent Living (NCIL) was founded by Max Starkloff, Charlie Carr, and Marca Bristo.
- 1983 – A national Americans Disabled for Accessible Public Transit (ADAPT) action was held for accessible transportation in Denver, Colorado at the American Public Transit Association (APTA) Convention.
- 1983 – The World Institute on Disability (WID) was established in Berkeley, California, by Edward Roberts, Judy Heumann, and Joan Leon.
- 1983 – The Disabled Children's Computer Group (DCCG) was founded in Berkeley, California.
- 1983 – The National Council on the Handicapped called for Congress to include persons with disabilities in the Civil Rights Act of 1964 and other civil and voting rights legislation and regulations.
- 1983 – The United Nations expanded the International Year of Disabled Persons to the International Decade of Disabled Persons (1983–1992).
- 1983 – The Job Accommodation Network (JAN) was founded by the President's Committee on Employment of the Handicapped to provide information to businesses with disabled employees.
- 1983 – Amendments to the Rehabilitation Act of 1973 provided for the Client Assistance Program (CAP), an advocacy program for consumers of rehabilitation and independent living services.
- 1983 – In Roncker v. Walter, 700 F2d. 1058 (6th Circuit Court 1983), the U.S. Sixth Circuit Court addressed the issue of "bringing educational services to the child" versus "bringing the child to the services". The case was resolved in favor of integrated versus segregated placement and established a principle of portability; that is, "if a desirable service currently provided in a segregated setting can feasiblely be delivered in an integrated setting, it would be inappropriate under PL 94-142 to provide the service in a segregated environment." The Roncker Court found that placement decisions must be individually made. School districts that automatically place children in a predetermined type of school solely on the basis of their disability (e.g., intellectually disabled) rather than on the basis of the IEP, violate federal laws.
- 1983 – Jablonski by Pahls v. United States, 712 F.2d 391 (9th Cir. 1983) is a landmark case in which the 9th Circuit Court of Appeals determined that a mental health professional's duty to predict dangerousness includes consulting a patient's prior records, and that their duty to protect includes the involuntary commitment of a dangerous individual; simply warning the foreseeable victim is insufficient.
- 1983 – State v. Crenshaw, 98 Wash. 2d 789, 659 P.2d 488 (1983), is a criminal case interpreting the relationship of the insanity defense to a deific decree. The Supreme Court of Washington carved out the deific exception from the standard set forth in People v. Schmidt (1915), that a person can be found not guilty by reason of insanity even if they knew their act was morally wrong by the standards of society and wrong under the law, if their mental disorder was a delusion that God commanded their act. A mother insanely killed her child in the delusional belief that she was obeying God's command. It was found that "it would be unrealistic to hold her responsible for the crime, since her free will has been subsumed by her belief in the deific decree.
- 1983 – The Supreme Court of Georgia held the Georgia sterilization code unconstitutional because it used the "preponderance of the evidence" standard, and a court order that permanently deprives a person of a fundamental right requires a judicial finding of "clear and convincing" evidence. Since this case, the Georgia legislature changed the code to require "clear and convincing" evidence in order to comply with the requirements of the Constitution.
- 1983 – Heckler v. Campbell, 461 U.S. 458 (1983), is a United States Supreme Court case concerning whether the United States Secretary of Health and Human Services could rely on published medical-vocational guidelines to determine a claimant's right to Social Security benefits. In an opinion delivered by Justice Powell, the Supreme Court reversed the Second Circuit, saying that "[w]here the statute expressly entrusts the Secretary with the responsibility for implementing a provision by regulation, review is limited to determining whether the regulations promulgated exceeded the Secretary's statutory authority and whether they are arbitrary and capricious." The Court decided that even where an agency's enabling statute expressly required that it hold a hearing, the agency could rely on its rulemaking authority to determine issues that didn't require case-by-case considerations. The court held that the Secretary's reliance on the guidelines were not inconsistent with the Social Security Act, nor were they arbitrary and capricious.
- 1984 – Ted Kennedy Jr., spoke from the platform of the Democratic National Convention on disability rights.
- 1984 - The Social Security Disability Benefits Reform Act of 1984 was signed into law by President Ronald Reagan.
- 1984 – In January 1984, the American government issued Baby Doe regulations whereby if parents refused treatment for their infants with congenital defects, Infant Care Review Committees were required to advise the hospital to alert the courts or a child protective agency. In 1986, those regulations were struck down by the U.S. Supreme Court in the case Bowen v. American Hospital Association (AHA), et al., on the grounds that the autonomy of the states had been violated and that the Rehabilitation Act of 1973 did not apply to the medical care of disabled infants. However, on October 9, 1984, the final Baby Doe law, known as the Baby Doe Amendment, amended the Child Abuse Prevention and Treatment Act of 1974 to include the withholding of fluids, food, and medically indicated treatment from disabled newborns. This law went into effect on June 1, 1985 and is still in effect.
- 1984 – The Insanity Defense Reform Act of 1984 amended the United States federal laws governing defendants with mental diseases or defects to make it significantly more difficult to obtain a verdict of not guilty only by reason of insanity. It removed the volitional component, that a defendant lacked capacity to conform their conduct to the law, from the ALI test. Defendants were only exculpated only if "at the time of the commission of the acts constituting the offense, ... as the result of a severe mental disease or defect, [they were] unable to appreciate the nature and quality or wrongfulness of [their] acts." The law passed in the wake of public outrage after John Hinckley Jr.'s acquittal by reason of insanity for his attempted assassination of President Ronald Reagan. Prior to the enactment of the law, the federal standard for "insanity" was that the government had to prove a defendant's sanity beyond a reasonable doubt (assuming the insanity defense was raised). Following the Act's enactment, the defendant has the burden of proving insanity by "clear and convincing evidence." Furthermore, expert witnesses for either side are prohibited from testifying directly as to whether the defendant was legally sane or not, but can only testify as to their mental health and capacities, with the question of sanity itself to be decided by the finder-of-fact at trial.
- 1984 – The U.S. Supreme Court ruled in Irving Independent School District v. Tatro that school districts are required under the Education for All Handicapped Children Act of 1975 to provide intermittent catheterization performed by the school nurse or a nurse's aide as a "related service" to a disabled student. School districts can no longer refuse to educate a disabled child because they might need such service.
- 1984 – The National Council of the Handicapped became an independent federal agency.
- 1984 – The Social Security Disability Reform Act was passed in response to the complaints of hundreds of thousands of people whose social security disability benefits were terminated. The law required that payment of benefits and health insurance coverage continue for terminated recipients until they exhausted their appeals.
- 1984 – The Voting Accessibility for the Elderly and Handicapped Act became law in the U.S., and it mandated "handicapped and elderly" access to polling places, and provided for the creation of permanent disabled access voter registration sites.
- 1981–1984 – The Reagan administration threatened to amend or revoke regulations implementing Section 504 of the Rehabilitation Act of 1973 and the Education for All Handicapped Children Act of 1975. Disability rights advocates Patrisha Wright of the Disability Rights Education and Defense Fund (DREDF), and Evan Kemp Jr. (of the Disability Rights Center) led an intense lobbying and grassroots campaign that generated more than 40,000 cards and letters. After three years, the Reagan Administration abandoned its attempts to revoke or amend the regulations. However, the Reagan Administration terminated the Social Security benefits of hundreds of thousands of disabled recipients. Distressed by this action, several disabled people committed suicide. A variety of groups including the Alliance of Social Security Disability Recipients and the Ad Hoc Committee on Social Security Disability fought these terminations.
- 1984 – Pennhurst State School and Hospital v. Halderman, 465 U.S. 89 (1984), was a United States Supreme Court decision holding that the Eleventh Amendment prohibits a federal court from ordering state officials to obey state law.
- 1984 - Since shortly after Eleanor Bumpurs' death in 1984, members of the NYPD Emergency Service Unit have carried Tasers, weapons that can deliver thousands of volts of incapacitating electric current, as an alternative to the use of firearms when dealing with the mentally ill.
- 1985 – The Mental Illness Bill of Rights Act became law in the U.S., and it required states to provide protection and advocacy services to protect and advocate for people with psychological disabilities.
- 1985 – Ake v. Oklahoma, 470 U.S. 68 (1985), was a case in which the Supreme Court of the United States held that the Due Process Clause of the Fourteenth Amendment required the state to provide a psychiatric evaluation to be used on behalf of an indigent criminal defendant if they needed it.
- 1985 – The Maine Supreme Judicial Court heard a petition from a mother requesting for the court to authorize the sterilization of her mentally incompetent daughter. The court held that it did have the authority to grant a petition for sterilization if it is proven with clear and convincing evidence the sterilization is in the best interest of the patient; however, in this case, the court did not grant the petition because the physicians did not state the patient was capable of reproducing.
- 1985 – Final legal hearings on eugenics were held in the Commonwealth of Virginia. No financial settlement was granted.
- 1985 – The U.S. Supreme Court ruled in Burlington School Committee v. Department of Education that schools must pay the expenses of disabled children enrolled in private programs during litigation under the Education for All Handicapped Children Act of 1975, if the courts ruled that such placement is needed to provide the child with an appropriate education in the least restrictive environment.
- 1985 – The U.S. Supreme Court ruled in City of Cleburne v. Cleburne Living Center that localities cannot use zoning laws to prohibit group homes for people with developmental disabilities from opening in a residential area solely because its residents are disabled.
- 1985 – In People v. Skinner (1985), the California Supreme Court further specified the criteria for "settled insanity". The person must have a mental illness that is relatively stable over time, not caused solely by the length of time the substance was abused, and it must also meet the legal definition of insanity in that jurisdiction. Therefore, it appears that the court is stating that a threshold condition for the insanity defense exists when there is a permanent impairment caused by chronic substance abuse in a person with a preexisting mental illness unrelated to substance abuse, but aggravated or set off by voluntary intoxication.
- 1985 – The International Polio Network was founded by Gini Laurie, and began advocating for recognition of post-polio syndrome.
- 1985 – The National Association of Psychiatric Survivors was founded.
- 1985 – The North Carolina Supreme Court held that a court has authority to authorize the sterilization of an incompetent person if the sterilization is in the best interest of the patient.
- 1985 – The Supreme Court of California held that a California statute that completely prohibits the sterilization of developmentally disabled people is overbroad and unconstitutional because a mentally incompetent person has a constitutional right to sterilization if a less intrusive method of birth control is not available.
- 1986 – Toward Independence, a report of the National Council on the Handicapped, outlined the legal status of Americans with disabilities and documented the existence of discrimination. It cited the need for federal civil rights legislation (eventually passed as the Americans with Disabilities Act of 1990).
- 1986 – PL 99-308 became law, allowing former mental patients to appeal to restore their rights to purchase firearms.
- 1986 – Concrete Change, a grassroots organization advocating accessible housing, was organized in Atlanta, Georgia.
- 1986 – The Employment Opportunities for Disabled Americans Act was passed, allowing recipients of Supplemental Security Income and Social Security Disability Insurance to retain benefits, particularly medical coverage, after they obtain work.
- 1986 – The Protection and Advocacy for Mentally Ill Individuals Act was passed setting up protection and advocacy (P & A) agencies for people who are in-patients or residents of mental health facilities.
- 1986 - The Handicapped Children's Protection Act of 1986 became law.
- 1986 – The Rehabilitation Act Amendments of 1986 defined supported employment as a "legitimate rehabilitation outcome."
- 1986 – Colorado v. Connelly, 479 U.S. 157 (1986), was a U.S. Supreme Court case that was initiated by Francis Connelly, who insisted that his schizophrenic episode rendered him incompetent, nullifying his waiver of his Miranda rights. The court ruled that because Connelly was not coerced by the Government to divulge any information, his statement should be allowed in Court due to the lack of violation of the Due Process Clause.
- 1986 – Ford v. Wainwright, 477 U.S. 399 (1986), was a U.S. Supreme Court case that upheld the common law rule that the insane cannot be executed.
- 1986 – The Fair Labor Standards Act of 1938 was amended to allow the United States Secretary of Labor to provide special certificates to allow an employer to pay less than the minimum wage to individuals whose earning or productive capacity is impaired by age, physical or mental deficiency, or injury. These employees must still be paid wages that are related to the individual's productivity and commensurate with those paid to similarly located and employed non-disabled workers. Paying workers with disabilities less than the minimum wage was outlawed in New Hampshire in 2015, Maryland in 2016, and Alaska in 2018.
- 1986 – Rhode Island: No person shall be deprived of life, liberty or property without due process of law, nor shall any person be denied equal protection of the laws. No otherwise qualified person shall, solely by reason of race, gender or handicap be subject to discrimination by the state, its agents or any person or entity doing business with the state. Nothing in this section shall be construed to grant or secure any right relating to abortion or the funding thereof. – Rhode Island Constitution, Article I, §2 (1986).
- 1986 - In U.S. Department of Transportation (DOT) v. Paralyzed Veterans of America (PVA) (1986) the Supreme Court held that private, commercial air carriers are not liable under Section 504 of the Rehabilitation Act of 1973 because they are not "direct recipients" of federal funding to airports.
- 1986 – The Air Carrier Access Act of 1986 was passed prohibiting commercial airlines from discriminating against passengers with disabilities.
- 1986 - Baltimore Leather Association of the Deaf (BLADeaf), the first deaf leather club in America, was founded. Its original name was Maryland Lambda Alliance of the Deaf and it had three name changes before its name was changed to BLADeaf. It was founded by Elwood C. Bennett, Scott Wilson, and Harry "Abbe" Woosley, Jr.
- 1987 – Gini Laurie founded the International Ventilator Users Network (IVUN).
- 1987 – In School Bd. of Nassau County v. Arline, 480 U.S. 273 (1987), the Supreme Court found that a person with a contagious disease is considered a "handicapped individual" and therefore is entitled to the protections of the Rehabilitation Act of 1973.
- 1987 – Justin Dart, Commissioner of the Rehabilitation Services Administration, was forced to resign after he testified to the U.S. Congress that "an inflexible federal system, like the society it represents, still contains a significant portion of individuals who have not yet overcome obsolete, paternalistic attitudes toward disability..."
- 1987 – The Alliance for Technology Access was founded in California by the Disabled Children's Computer Group and the Apple Computer Office of Special Education.
- 1987 – Prior to 1987 it was assumed that the Lanterman–Petris–Short Act allowed involuntary treatment for those who were detained under an initial three day hold (for evaluation and treatment) and a subsequent fourteen day hospitalization (for those people declared after the three-day hold to be dangerous to themselves or others or gravely disabled). However, in 1987 in Riese v. St. Mary's Hospital and Medical Center the California Court of Appeal declared that these people had the right to exercise informed consent regarding the use of antipsychotic drugs, except in an emergency, and if they rejected medication "a judicial determination of their incapacity to make treatment decisions" was required before they could be involuntarily treated. This case was a class action suit brought in the name of Eleanor Riese by the California ACLU.
- 1988 - In 1988, Elvy Musikka, who had glaucoma, was arrested for growing marijuana plants in her backyard in Hollywood, Florida. Facing a five-year jail sentence, she was defended by activist attorney Norm Kent at a trial where her doctor and activist Robert Randall, also a glaucoma sufferer, testified. The judge found her not guilty due to medical necessity.
- 1988 – The Civil Rights Restoration Act counteracted bad case law by clarifying Congress' original intention. Under the Rehabilitation Act, discrimination in any program or service that receives federal funding – not just the part which actually and directly receives the funding – is illegal.
- 1988 – A Deaf President Now student demonstration was held at Gallaudet University in Washington, D.C. On March 13 Dr. I. King Jordan was named the first Deaf president of the university.
- 1988 – The Fair Housing Act was amended to protect people with disabilities from housing discrimination in the areas of rentals, sales, and financing, as outlined in the Civil Rights Act of 1968. The amendment also provided that reasonable modifications had to be made to existing buildings and accessibility had to be constructed into new multi-family housing units.
- 1988 – Americans Disabled for Accessible Public Transit (ADAPT) protested inaccessible Greyhound buses.
- 1988 – The Technology-Related Assistance Act for Individuals with Disabilities became law in the U.S., authorizing federal funding to state projects designed to facilitate access to assistive technology. The Act was reauthorized in 1994 (P.L. 103-218) and again in 1998 (P.L. 105-394). It was designated as a systems change grant and is often called the "Tech Act" for short. Due to the Act every state and territory of the United States was awarded a Tech Act project. The first group of projects started in 1989. Each state project had five years of funding under the 1989 law. A competitive grant application was required to receive an additional five years of funds. Projects were assured of eight years of full funding; the ninth year at 75% of full funding; and the tenth year as a Tech Act project at 50% of full funding. Legislation supporting the state assistive technology projects was scheduled to sunset on September 30, 2004. The Assistive Technology Act of 2004 (P.L. 108-364) reauthorized the assistive technology programs in all states and territories for five years as a formula-based program, and removed the sunset provision from the law. It also required states to provide direct aid to individuals with disabilities to ensure they have access to the technology they need. As a result, the majority of state efforts are required to be conducted in the following areas: assistive technology reutilization programs, assistive technology demonstration programs, alternative financing programs and device loan programs.
- 1988 – The Congressional Task Force on the Rights and Empowerment of Americans with Disabilities was created by Rep. Major Owens, with Justin Whitlock Dart Jr. and Elizabeth Monroe Boggs as co-chairs. The Task Force began building grassroots support for passage of the Americans with Disabilities Act (ADA).
- 1988 – San Francisco historian and disability rights scholar Paul K. Longmore burned his first book, "The Invention of George Washington", on the steps of a federal building in 1988 to protest policies that discriminated against disabled Americans. The Social Security Administration eventually revised its rules to allow disabled authors to count publishing royalties as earned income. The change became known as the "Longmore Amendment".
- 1988 – The Iowa Supreme Court held that a district court has jurisdiction to authorize the sterilization of an incompetent person, even in the absence of an Iowa statute regulating sterilization.
- 1988 – An act, passed by the General Assembly of Virginia in 1988 and amended in 2013, provides the procedural requirements necessary for a physician to lawfully sterilize a patient capable of giving informed consent and incapable of giving informed consent. A physician may perform a sterilization procedure on a patient if the patient is capable of giving informed consent, the patient consents to the procedure in writing, and the physician explains the consequences of the procedure and alternative methods of contraception. A court may authorize a physician to perform a sterilization on a mentally incompetent adult or child after the procedural requirements are met and the court finds with clear and convincing evidence the patient is or is likely to engage sexual activity, no other contraceptive is reasonably available, the patient's mental disability renders the patient permanently unable to care for a child, and the procedure conforms with medical standards.
- 1988 – In Honig v. Doe, the U.S. Supreme Court affirmed the stay-put rule established under the Education for All Handicapped Children Act of 1975. School authorities cannot expel or suspend or otherwise move disabled children from the setting agreed upon in the child's Individualized Education Program (IEP) without a due process hearing.
- 1988 – The original version of the Americans with Disabilities Act was introduced in 1988. It was redrafted and reintroduced in Congress later. Disability organizations and activists across the country advocated on its behalf (Patrisha Wright, Marilyn Golden, Liz Savage, Justin Dart, and Elizabeth Monroe Boggs, among others).
- 1989 – Community Options was founded by Robert Stack, Dr. Colleen Wieck, Frank Zak, Paul Hritz and Elizabeth Pendler, with a mission to develop supports for persons with disabilities.
- 1989 – In Penry v. Lynaugh, 492 U.S. 302 (1989), the U.S. Supreme Court ruled the Eighth Amendment did not forbid executing mentally disabled people; however, they also ruled that the three "special issues" a Texas jury was required to consider before imposing the death penalty did not adequately allow the jury in Penry's sentencing hearing to consider his alleged intellectual disability as a mitigating factor.
- 1989 – In ADAPT v. Skinner, the U.S. Third Circuit Court of Appeals ruled that federal regulations requiring that transit authorities spend only 3% of their budgets on access are arbitrary and discriminatory.
- 1989 – The Center for Universal Design (originally the Center for Accessible Housing) was founded by Ronald Mace in Raleigh, North Carolina.
- 1989 – Mouth: The Voice of Disability Rights began publication in Rochester, New York.
- 1989 – The President's Committee on Employment of the Handicapped was renamed the President's Committee on Employment of People with Disabilities.
- 1989 – In Daniel R.R. v State Board of Education, 874 F.2d 1036 (5th Circuit Court 1989), the U.S. Fifth Circuit Court of Appeals found that regular education placement is appropriate if a child with a disability can receive a satisfactory education, even if it is not the best academic setting for the child; non-academic benefits must also be considered. The Court stated that "academic achievement is not the only purpose of mainstreaming. Integrating a handicapped child into a nonhandicapped environment may be beneficial in and of itself...even if the child cannot flourish academically." The Circuit Court developed a two-pronged test to determine if the district's actions were in compliance with the Individuals with Disabilities Education Act (IDEA): 1) Can education in the regular classroom with the use of supplemental aids and services be achieved satisfactorily? 2) If it cannot, has the school mainstreamed the child to the maximum extent appropriate?
- 1989 – Judge Kovachevich of the United States District Court for the Middle District of Florida ruled that Eliana Martínez, who had AIDS, could sit at a desk in a classroom without isolation partitions; Eliana attended her first day of school on April 27, 1989.

== 1990s ==
- 1990s – In the 1990s, Hillary Clinton, at the suggestion of Visitors Office Director Melinda N. Bates, approved the addition of a ramp in the East Wing corridor of the White House. It allows easy wheelchair access for the public tours and special events that enter through the secure entrance building on the east side.
- 1990 – The Hate Crime Statistics Act of 1990 28 U.S.C. § 534, requires the Attorney General to collect data on crimes committed because of the victim's disability, race, religion, sexual orientation, or ethnicity. The bill was signed into law in 1990 by George H. W. Bush.
- 1990 – The Indiana Court of Appeals held that an appointed guardian may consent to health care for an adult incapable of consenting if there is "clear and convincing evidence that the judicially appointed guardian brought the petition for sterilization in good faith and the sterilization is in the best interest of the incompetent adult." Judge Sullivan wrote a concurring opinion stating that he was not convinced that in this present case the sterilization was done for healthcare, and consequentially, the consent of the guardian is not a factor in considering the legality of the sterilization. According to Sullivan a sterilization of an incompetent requires "an evidentiary hearing, following which the court finds clear and convincing evidence that sterilization is in the best interests of the individual concerned.
- 1990 – The Colorado Supreme Court held that a person "mentally incompetent to make some decisions is not necessarily incompetent . . . to grant or withhold consent to sterilization." Three members of the Court dissented from the majority opinion and stated that the "individual's capacity to understand the risks of pregnancy and childbirth [should also be part of] the test for determining one's competence to make a decision regarding sterilization."
- 1990 – Sullivan v. Zebley, 493 U.S. 521 (1990), was a landmark decision by the United States Supreme Court involving the determination of childhood Social Security Disability benefits. In the decision, the Supreme Court ruled that substantial parts of the Supplemental Security Income program's regulation on determining disability for children were inconsistent with the Social Security Act; particularly, the statutory standard of "comparable severity." The suit highlighted what some felt was the need for a step in the evaluation of childhood disability claims that would be akin to the functional evaluation considered in many adult claims. It resulted in the addition of a consideration of functioning, and not merely medical severity, in children's SSI claims. Prior to Zebley, a child would only be found disabled under the SSA's definition if he or she medically met or equaled one of SSA's listings of impairments. Following the ruling, the childhood definition of disability was changed to having "an impairment resulting in marked and severe functional limitations." Enrollment of disabled children on SSI dramatically increased following Zebley and its relaxation of SSA's definition of disability for children. The case is noted as part of the trend of the liberalization of welfare benefits occurring at the time of the ruling.
- 1990 – The Americans with Disabilities Act became law, and it provided comprehensive civil rights protection for people with disabilities. Closely modeled after the Civil Rights Act and Section 504, the law was the most sweeping disability rights legislation in American history. It mandated that local, state, and federal governments and programs be accessible, that employers with more than 15 employees make "reasonable accommodations" for workers with disabilities and not discriminate against otherwise qualified workers with disabilities, and that public accommodations and commercial facilities make "reasonable modifications" to ensure access for disabled members of the public, and not discriminate against them. It also mandated provision of disabled-access toilet facilities in private buildings. (Provision of disabled-access toilet facilities was mandated in federal buildings by the Architectural Barriers Act of 1968). The ADA also required access in public transportation and communication.
- 1990 – Sam Skinner, U.S. Secretary of Transportation, issued regulations mandating wheelchair lifts on buses.
- 1990 – Americans Disabled for Accessible Public Transit (ADAPT) organized the Wheels of Justice campaign in Washington, D.C., which drew hundreds of disabled people to support the Americans with Disabilities Act. Activists occupying the Capitol Rotunda were arrested when they refuse to leave.
- 1990 – The Committee of Ten Thousand was founded to advocate for Americans with hemophilia who were infected with HIV/AIDS through tainted blood products.
- 1990 – Perry v. Louisiana, 498 U.S. 38 (1990), was a United States Supreme Court case over the legality of the forcibly medicating a death row inmate with a mental disorder in order to render him competent to be executed. The court determined that the forcible medication of individuals to render them competent to be executed is impermissible. The case was remanded to the Louisiana Supreme Court for further deliberation in view of Washington v. Harper (1990), also a case involving involuntary medication, which had been decided after the District Court's ruling. Upon remand, the lower court ruled against the forcible medication of individuals in order to maintain their competency for execution. This decision was based on the distinction that, unlike the holding in Harper v. Washington concerning involuntary medication for treatment issues, forcing medication for the purposes of execution was not medical treatment (being "antithetical to the basic principles of the healing arts") but punishment. In addition, the lower court found two state laws on which to base its holding. First it found that forcibly medicating a person for the purposes of execution was cruel and unusual punishment under Louisiana state law because "it fails to measurably contribute to the social goals of capital punishment" by adding to the individual's punishment "beyond that required for the mere extinguishment of life," and could be "administered erroneously, arbitrarily or capriciously". It also held that forcible medication in this situation violated the right to privacy guaranteed by the Louisiana State Constitution because the inhumanity of the situation rendered the state's interest in executing a person under these conditions less compelling.
- 1990 – The Ryan White Comprehensive AIDS Resources Emergency Act became law in the U.S. It was meant to help communities cope with the HIV/AIDS epidemic.
- 1990 – The first Disability Pride Parade in the United States was held in Boston in 1990. The featured speaker was Karen Thompson, author of Why Can't Sharon Kowalski Come Home? The Boston Disability Pride Parade was held again in 1991, but has not been held since. It ended with the death of lead organizer, Diana Viets, and with the move of co-organizer Catherine Odette to Madison, Wisconsin.
- 1990 – In Washington v. Harper the U.S. Supreme Court upheld the involuntary medication of correctional facility inmates only under certain conditions as determined by established policy and procedures.
- 1990 – Americans Disabled for Accessible Public Transit (ADAPT) changed its focus to advocating for personal assistance services, changing its name to American Disabled for Attendant Programs Today (ADAPT).
- 1990 – The Education for All Handicapped Children Act was amended and renamed the Individuals with Disabilities Education Act (IDEA). This Act contains a permanently authorized grant program that provides federal funding to the states; all states that receive these federal funds are required to provide a "free, appropriate public education" to all children with disabilities in the "least restrictive environment."
- 1990 – Cruzan v. Director, Missouri Department of Health, 497 U.S. 261 (1990), was a landmark United States Supreme Court case involving a young adult incompetent. The first "right to die" case ever heard by the Court, Cruzan was argued on December 6, 1989 and decided on June 25, 1990. In a 5–4 decision, the Court affirmed the earlier ruling of the Supreme Court of Missouri and ruled in favor of the State of Missouri, finding it was acceptable to require "clear and convincing evidence" of a patient's wishes for removal of life support. A significant outcome of the case was the creation of advance health directives.
- 1991 - On January 23, 1991, the Television Decoder Circuitry Act of 1990 was passed by Congress. This Act gave the Federal Communications Commission (FCC) power to enact rules on the implementation of closed captioning. This Act required all analog television receivers with screens of at least 13 inches or greater, either sold or manufactured, to have the ability to display closed captioning by July 1, 1993.
- 1991 – In re Guardianship of Kowalski, 478 N.W.2d 790 (Minn. Ct. App. 1991), is a Minnesota Court of Appeals case that established a lesbian's partner as her legal guardian after Sharon Kowalski became incapacitated following an automobile accident. Because the case was contested by Kowalski's parents and family and initially resulted in the partner being excluded for several years from visiting Kowalski, the gay community celebrated the final resolution in favor of the partner as a victory for gay rights.
- 1991 – Prior to 1991, the Federal Medicaid program paid for services only if a person lived in an institution. The approval of Federal Medicaid Waiver programs allowed states to provide services to consumers in their homes and in their communities.
- 1991 – The Washington Court of Appeals heard a petition for sterilization brought by the parents of an incompetent child named K.M. The Court held that the sterilization of a mentally incompetent patient can be constitutional; however, the incompetent must be represented by independent counsel and the attorney must take an adversarial role in defense of the incompetent's reproductive rights. Two physicians testified in support of K.M.'s psychological need for sterilization, however; the Court held that K.M.'s attorney did not take an adversarial role because the physicians and witnesses should have been cross examined, and every argument in defense of K.M. should have made. The Appeals Court "remanded for a new hearing, with counsel appointed to represent K.M."
- 1991 – In Massachusetts, the Appeals Court affirmed the substituted consent standard and wrote that "the guardian's petition" to authorize an abortion for their borderline intellectually disabled daughter "should have been allowed."
- 1991 – Detectable warnings have been required for the edges of rail platforms in the United States since 1991.
- 1992 – Amendments to the Rehabilitation Act of 1973 were infused with the philosophy of independent living.
- 1992 – In Greer vs. Rome City School District (11th Circuit Court, 1992), the U.S. Eleventh Circuit Court stated "Before the school district may conclude that a handicapped child should be educated outside of the regular classroom it must consider whether supplemental aids and services would permit satisfactory education in the regular classroom." The court also said that the district cannot refuse to serve a child because of added cost, and that school officials must share placement considerations with the child's parents at the IEP meeting before a placement is determined.
- 1992 – In Foucha v. Louisiana, the U.S. Supreme Court ruled that the continued commitment of an insanity acquittee who was not suffering from a mental illness was unconstitutional.
- 1992 – In Riggins v. Nevada, the U.S. Supreme Court ruled that a defendant has the right to refuse psychiatric medication which is given to mitigate their psychiatric symptoms while they are on trial.
- 1993 - Jim Sinclair wrote the essay, "Don't Mourn for Us", with an anti-cure perspective on autism. The essay has been thought of by some to be a touchstone for the fledgling autism rights movement.
- 1993 – The American Indian Disability Legislation Project was established to collect data on Native American disability rights laws and regulations.
- 1993 – Robert Williams was appointed Commissioner of the Administration on Developmental Disabilities. He was the first developmentally disabled person to be named the Commissioner.
- 1993 – In Holland v. Sacramento City Unified School District, the U.S. Ninth Circuit Court affirmed the right of disabled children to attend public school classes with non-disabled children. The ruling was a major victory in the ongoing effort to ensure enforcement of the Individuals with Disabilities Education Act.
- 1993 – 3 men were convicted of sexually assaulting an intellectually disabled woman in New Jersey, despite attempts by the defense to depict the young woman as an aggressive "Lolita".
- 1993 – The U.S. Congress explicitly authorized the creation of special needs trusts so that people with disabilities could maintain their public benefits and also have access to other funds.
- 1993 – The Superior Court of Pennsylvania held that a mentally incompetent patient may be sterilized without her informed consent if there is clear and convincing evidence the sterilization is in her best interest.
- 1993 – In Heller v. Doe, the U.S. Supreme Court ruled that the procedures Kentucky had for involuntarily committing intellectually disabled people did not violate the Equal Protection Clause. The Court declared that because intellectually disabled persons are not a suspect classification, Kentucky's statute should only receive rational basis scrutiny.
- 1993 – In Oberti vs. Board of Education of the Borough of Clementon School District (3rd Circuit Court, 1993), the U.S. Third Circuit Court upheld the right of Rafael Oberti, a boy with Down syndrome, to receive his education in his regular neighborhood school with adequate and necessary supports, placing the burden of proof for compliance with IDEA's mainstreaming requirements on the school district and the state rather than on the family. The federal judge who decided the case endorsed full inclusion, writing "Inclusion is a right, not a special privilege for a select few."
- 1993 – The National Voter Registration Act of 1993 became law in the U.S., and it required states with disabled service agencies to have them act as disabled voter registration agencies as well.
- 1993 – In the case Mavis v. Sobol, a New York court found school efforts for placement in a regular classroom were inadequate because the school had not provided a behavior management plan or training for staff to help modify the regular curriculum to meet the student's needs.
- 1993 – Godinez v. Moran, 509 U.S. 389 (1993), was a landmark decision in which the U.S. Supreme Court ruled that if a defendant was competent to stand trial, they were automatically competent to plead guilty, and thereby waive the panoply of trial rights, including the right to counsel.
- 1993 – Zobrest v. Catalina Foothills School District, 509 U.S. 1 (1993), was a case before the United States Supreme Court. A deaf child and his parents sued the Catalina Foothills Unified School District in Arizona because the district refused to provide a sign language interpreter for the child after he transferred from a public school to Salpointe Catholic High School, a parochial school. Plaintiffs challenged the refusal to provide an interpreter on a variety of constitutional and statutory grounds, including the federal Individuals with Disabilities Education Act ("IDEA"), its Arizona counterpart, an IDEA regulation, the Arizona Constitution, and the Establishment and Free Exercise Clauses of the First Amendment to the United States Constitution. Plaintiffs successfully sought relief from a federal district court, which concluded "The service at issue in this case is part of a general government program that distributes benefits neutrally to any child qualifying as 'handicapped' under the IDEA, without regard to the 'sectarian-nonsectarian, or public-nonpublic nature' of the school the child attends". In a 5–4 decision, the Supreme Court reached the same issue, but reversed on the merits, finding that if it provided an interpreter the school district would not violate the Establishment Clause. So the Supreme Court ruled that a school must continue to provide an interpreter under the Individuals with Disabilities Education Act even if the child elects to attend a religious school, and in so doing it does not violate the Establishment Clause.
- 1994 – The Violent Crime Control and Law Enforcement Act expanded the scope of required FBI data to include hate crimes based on disability, and the FBI began collecting data on disability bias crimes on January 1, 1997. In 1996, Congress permanently reauthorized the Act.
- 1994 – Stephanie Keene was born at Fairfax Hospital in Virginia, the United States. At the time of her birth, she was missing most of her brain, including the cortex; only the brainstem, the portion of the brain responsible for autonomic and regulatory functions, such as the control of respiration, the heartbeat and blood pressure, had developed during pregnancy. When baby Keene was admitted to the hospital at six months of age for severe respiratory problems, the hospital filed a legal motion to appoint a guardian for the child's care and sought a court order that the hospital did not need to provide any services beyond palliative care. At trial, several experts testified that providing ventilator support to an anencephalic infant (as Keene was) went beyond the accepted standard of medical care. In contrast, the baby's mother argued her case on the grounds of religious freedom and the sanctity of life. In 1994, in a controversial ruling, the United States District Court for the Eastern District of Virginia decided that the hospital caring for Keene must put her on a mechanical ventilator whenever she had trouble breathing. The court interpreted the Emergency Medical Treatment and Active Labor Act (EMTALA) to require continued ventilation for the infant. The wording of this act requires that patients who present with a medical emergency must get "such treatment as may be required to stabilize the medical condition" before the patient is transferred to another facility. The court refused to take a moral or ethical position on the issue, insisting that it was only interpreting the laws as they existed. As a result of the decision, Keene was kept alive much longer than most anencephalic babies. It has been suggested by the dissenting judge in the case that the court should have used the condition anencephaly as the basis of the case, not the recurring subsidiary symptoms of respiratory distress. As the irreversibility of anencephaly is widely understood in the medical community, he argued that the decision to continue futile care only resulted in the repetitive diversion of medical equipment.
- 1994 – 1998: Study 329 was a clinical trial conducted in North America from 1994 to 1998 to study the efficacy of paroxetine, an SSRI anti-depressant, in treating 12- to 18-year-olds diagnosed with major depressive disorder. Led by Martin Keller, then professor of psychiatry at Brown University, and funded by the British pharmaceutical company SmithKline Beecham—known since 2000 as GlaxoSmithKline (GSK)—the study compared paroxetine with imipramine, a tricyclic antidepressant, and placebo (an inert pill). SmithKline Beecham had released paroxetine in 1991, marketing it as Paxil in North America and Seroxat in the UK. The drug attracted sales of $11.7 billion in the United States alone from 1997 to 2006, including $2.12 billion in 2002, the year before it lost its patent. Published in July 2001 in the Journal of the American Academy of Child and Adolescent Psychiatry (JAACAP), which listed Keller and 21 other researchers as co-authors, study 329 became controversial when it was discovered that the article had been ghostwritten by a PR firm hired by SmithKline Beecham; had made inappropriate claims about the drug's efficacy; and had downplayed safety concerns. The controversy led to several lawsuits and strengthened calls for drug companies to disclose all their clinical research data.
- 1995 – Justice for All was organized by Justin Dart and others in Washington, D.C., in order to advocate against calls to amend or repeal the Americans with Disabilities Act and the Individuals with Disabilities Education Act.
- 1995 – The American Association of People with Disabilities was founded in Washington, D.C.
- 1995 – The state of Kansas passed a law (Kan. Stat. Ann. § 22-3220) which revoked the traditional insanity defense. Defendants could no longer argue that, because of their mental illness, they were incapable of deciding right from wrong. Instead, defendants with mental illness were only permitted to argue that their mental illness prevented them from forming the specific intent (or mens rea) needed to commit the crime.
- 1995 – The American film When Billy Broke His Head... and Other Tales of Wonder, by Billy Golfus, premiered on PBS. It highlighted the disability rights movement.
- 1995 – The U.S. Court of Appeals, Third Circuit, ruled in Helen L. v. Snider that continued institutionalization of a disabled Pennsylvania woman, when not medically necessary and where there was the option of home care, was a violation of her rights under the Americans with Disabilities Act of 1990. Disability rights advocates perceived this ruling as a landmark decision regarding the rights of people in nursing homes to personal assistance services.
- 1995 – Sandra Jensen was denied a heart-lung transplant by the Stanford University School of Medicine in California because she had Down syndrome. After pressure from disability rights activists, Stanford U School of Medicine administrators reversed their decision. In 1996, Jensen became the first person with Down syndrome to receive a heart-lung transplant.
- 1995 – The Congressional Accountability Act of 1995 (CAA) became law in the U.S., and it required all offices in the legislative branch to make their public services, programs, activities, and places of public accommodation accessible to members of the public who have disabilities, as well as declaring that employees of Congress cannot be discriminated against in personnel actions because of a disability.
- 1996 - The Telecommunications Act of 1996 expanded on the Television Decoder Circuitry Act of 1990 to place the same closed captioning requirements on digital television receivers by July 1, 2002.
- 1996 – The Mental Health Parity Act of 1996 (MHPA) became law in the U.S. and it required that large group health plans not impose annual or lifetime dollar limits on mental health benefits that are less favorable than any such limits imposed on medical/surgical benefits.
- 1996 – Paralyzed Veterans of America v. Ellerbe Becket Architects and Engineers, one of the first major Americans with Disabilities Act lawsuits, was focused on the wheelchair accessibility of a stadium project that was still in the design phase, MCI Center in Washington, D.C. Previous to this case, which was filed only five years after the ADA was passed, the DOJ was unable or unwilling to provide clarification on the distribution requirements for accessible wheelchair locations in large assembly spaces. While Section 4.33.3 of ADAAG makes reference to lines of sight, no specific reference is made to seeing over standing patrons. The MCI Center, designed by Ellerbe Becket Architects & Engineers, was designed with too few wheelchair and companion seats, and the ones that were included did not provide sight lines that would enable the wheelchair user to view the playing area while the spectators in front of them were standing. This case and another related case established precedent on seat distribution and sight lines issues for ADA enforcement that continues to present day.
- 1996 – Cooper v. Oklahoma, 517 U.S. 348 (1996), was a United States Supreme Court case in which the Court reversed an Oklahoma court decision holding that a defendant is presumed to be competent to stand trial unless he proves otherwise by the second highest legal standard of proof, that of clear and convincing evidence, ruling that to be unconstitutional. The court said the defendant's Fourteenth Amendment rights to due process were violated.
- 1997 – Kansas v. Hendricks, 521 U.S. 346 (1997), was a United States Supreme Court case in which the Court set forth procedures for the indefinite civil commitment of prisoners convicted of a sex offense whom the state deems dangerous due to a mental abnormality.
- 1997 – The Campus Hate Crimes Right to Know Act of 1997 enacted 20 U.S.C. § 1092(f)(1)(F)(ii), which requires campus security authorities to collect and report data on hate crimes committed on the basis of disability, race, gender, religion, sexual orientation, or ethnicity.
- 1998 – The Veterans Programs Enhancement Act became law in the U.S., and it required a cost-of-living adjustment in rates of compensation paid to veterans with service-connected disabilities, as well as various improvements in education, housing, and cemetery programs of the Department of Veterans Affairs.
- 1998 – The first support group for sexual minorities with developmental disabilities was created in 1998 at the New Haven Gay & Lesbian Community Center in Connecticut.
- 1998 – The Persian Gulf War Veterans Act of 1998 (Public Law 105-277) became law in the U.S., and it required the Secretary of Veterans Affairs to determine, based on National Academy of Sciences' Institute of Medicine (IOM) reports, whether particular illnesses warrant a presumption of service connection and, if so, to set compensation regulations establishing such a connection for each illness.
- 1998 – Stewart v. Martinez-Villareal, 523 U.S. 637 (1998), was a decision by the United States Supreme Court, which held that 28 U.S.C. § 2244(b) did not apply to a petition that raises only a competency to be executed claim and that respondent did not, therefore, need authorization to file his petition in the District Court.
- 1998 – The Michigan Supreme Court held that a probate court has jurisdiction to hear a petition by a guardian for authorization to consent to an extraordinary procedure, including sterilization, if the procedure is in the ward's best interest.
- 1998 – The case Connecticut vs. Kenneth Curtis changed the views in the justice system of mental competence to stand trial. Prior to this case, those given such an assessment were viewed as not restorable, and charges would be dismissed in favor of periodic reviews used only in determining the need for a civil commitment.
- 1998 – In Bragdon v. Abbott, the U.S. Supreme Court decided that under the Americans with Disabilities Act, the definition of disability includes asymptomatic HIV. Also in that case, the U.S. Supreme Court held that reproduction does qualify as a major life activity according to the Americans with Disabilities Act of 1990.
- 1998 – In Jervon Lamont Herbin v. Commonwealth of Virginia (1998), Herbin appealed his convictions of malicious wounding, two counts of forcible sodomy, abduction, and attempted rape. The appeals court held that a "settled insanity" defense requires substantial evidence of not only long-term and heavy substance abuse, but convincing evidence of a mental disorder that is caused by long-term substance abuse. In Herbin, the court found that
  "The weight of authority in this country recognizes an insanity defense that is based on a mental disease or defect produced by long-term substance abuse." Commonwealth v. Herd, 413 Mass. 834, 604 N.E.2d 1294, 1299 (1992). At the same time, "evidence of mere narcotics addiction, standing alone and without other physiological or psychological involvement, raises no issue of such a mental defect or disease as can serve as a basis for the insanity defense." United States v. Lyons, 731 F.2d 243, 245 (5th Cir.1984) (citing cases). Although appellant produced evidence of long-term and severe drug abuse, he did not present any evidence that he was suffering from any mental disease as a result of this drug abuse. See Hooks v. State, 534 So.2d 329, 353 (Ala.Crim.App.1987), aff'd sub nom. Ex parte Hooks, 534 So.2d 371 (Ala.1988). – See more at: https://caselaw.findlaw.com/va-court-of-appeals/1349937.html#sthash.YduwJJE7.dpuf
  Although Herbin did provide evidence of substantial drug abuse in the past, he was unable to provide expert witness testimony of any mental disorder. The court held that the substance abuse did not serve as evidence for a "settled insanity" defense alone without the link to a mental disorder. No lay witnesses testified as to any behavior consistent with insanity, even if lay testimony were admissible to establish the insanity defense in Virginia. Also, although Herbin did provide an extensive history of drug and sexual abuse, the court said no evidence showed either of these issues were causes or results of a mental disorder. Therefore, the appeals court upheld his conviction.
- 1998 – In Pennsylvania Department of Corrections v. Yeskey, the U.S. Supreme Court decided that the Americans with Disabilities Act includes state prisons.
- 1998 – President Clinton signed into law the Rehabilitation Act of 1973 Amendments, which includes Section 508. Section 508 "requires access to the Federal government's electronic and information technology. The law covers all types of electronic and information technology in the Federal sector and is not limited to assistive technologies used by people with disabilities."
- 1998 – Title four of the Workforce Investment Act of 1998 amended the Rehabilitation Act of 1973 in order to work with the WIA to accomplish the goal of helping people return to the workforce. Title four created a national council on disability, appointed by the president, to link rehabilitation programs to state and local workforce development systems. However, the Workforce Investment Act was repealed and replaced by the 2014 Workforce Innovation and Opportunity Act.
- 1998 – "No person shall be deprived of any right because of race, religion, national origin, or physical disability." – Florida Constitution, Article I, §2 (1998).
- 1998 - Zamora-Quezada v. HealthTexas Medical Group (begun in 1998) was the first time the Americans with Disabilities Act of 1990 was used against HMOs when a novel lawsuit was filed by Texas attorney Robert Provan against five HMOs for their practice of revoking the contracts of doctors treating disabled patients. In 1999, these HMOs sought to dismiss Provan's lawsuit, but a federal court ruled against them, and the case was settled out of court. Many decisions relating to Provan’s unique lawsuit against these HMOs have been cited in other court cases since.
- 1999 – In 1999, Jack Kevorkian was arrested and tried for his direct role in a case of voluntary euthanasia of a disabled person (Thomas Youk, who had amyotrophic lateral sclerosis.) Kevorkian was convicted of second-degree murder and served eight years of a 10-to-25-year prison sentence. He was released on parole on June 1, 2007, on condition he would not offer advice nor participate nor be present in the act of any type of suicide involving euthanasia to any other person; as well as neither promote nor talk about the procedure of assisted suicide.
- 1999 – In Carolyn C. Cleveland v. Policy Management Systems Corporation, et al., the U.S. Supreme Court decided that people receiving Social Security disability benefits are protected against discrimination under the Americans with Disabilities Act if and when they are able to return to work.
- 1999 – In Olmstead v. L.C., the U.S. Supreme Court decided that individuals with mental disabilities must be offered services in the most integrated setting possible.
- 1999 – The Works Incentives Improvement Act (Ticket to Work) became law in the U.S., allowing those who require health care benefits to work.
- 1999 – In Cedar Rapids Community School District v. Garret F., the U.S. Supreme Court ruled that taxpayer-supported schools are responsible for the costs of providing continual care for disabled students under a federal law that says all children must receive "free, appropriate public education." Under the Court's reading of the IDEA's relevant provisions, medical treatments such as suctioning, ventilator checks, catheterization, and others which can be administered by non-physician personnel come within the parameters of the special education law's related services.
- 1999 – The United States Social Security Administration's Ticket to Work and Self-Sufficiency Program is the centerpiece of the Ticket to Work and Work Incentives Improvement Act of 1999; this free and voluntary program supports career development for people who receive Social Security disability benefits. The Ticket program helps move eligible beneficiaries toward financial independence by connecting them with service providers to receive employment-related services and supports to succeed in the workforce. Anyone who is age 18 through 64 and receives Social Security Disability Insurance (SSDI) benefits under Title II of the Social Security Act and/or Supplemental Security Income (SSI) payments under Title XVI of the Social Security Act is eligible for the Ticket program.
- 1999 – The Texas Advance Directives Act (1999), also known as the Texas Futile Care Law, describes certain provisions that are now Chapter 166 of the Texas Health & Safety Code. Controversy over these provisions mainly centers on Section 166.046, Subsection (e),^{1} which allows a health care facility to discontinue life-sustaining treatment ten days after giving written notice if the continuation of life-sustaining treatment is considered futile care by the treating medical team. Although it is often stated that the act is officially named as the 'Futile Care Law' or the 'Futile Care Act', that is in fact incorrect and the statute has never legally had that title.
- 1999 – In Barden v. The City of Sacramento filed in March 1999, it was claimed that the City of Sacramento failed to comply with the Americans with Disabilities Act when, while making public street improvements, it did not bring its sidewalks into compliance with the ADA. Certain issues were resolved in federal court. One issue, whether sidewalks were covered by the ADA, was appealed to the 9th Circuit Court of Appeals, which ruled that sidewalks were a "program" under ADA and must be made accessible to persons with disabilities. The ruling was later appealed to the U.S. Supreme Court, which refused to hear the case, letting stand the ruling of the 9th Circuit Court.
- 1999 – Bates v. United Parcel Service, Inc (begun in 1999) was the first equal opportunity employment class action brought on behalf of deaf and hard of hearing workers throughout the country concerning workplace discrimination. It established legal precedence for deaf and hard of hearing employees and customers to be fully covered under the ADA. Key findings included
1. UPS failed to address communication barriers and to ensure equal conditions and opportunities for deaf employees;
2. Deaf employees were routinely excluded from workplace information, denied opportunities for promotion, and exposed to unsafe conditions due to lack of accommodations by UPS;
3. UPS also lacked a system to alert these employees as to emergencies, such as fires or chemical spills, to ensure that they would safely evacuate their facility; and
4. UPS had no policy to ensure that deaf applicants and employees actually received effective communication in the workplace.

The outcome was that UPS agreed to pay a $5.8 million award and agreed to a comprehensive accommodations program that was implemented in their facilities throughout the country.

- 1999 – Kendra's Law, effective since November 1999, is a New York State law concerning involuntary outpatient commitment. It grants judges the authority to issue orders that require people who meet certain criteria to regularly undergo psychiatric treatment. Failure to comply could result in commitment for up to 72 hours. Kendra's Law does not require that patients are forced to take medication.
- 1999 – In the case Albertsons Inc. v. Kirkingburg, the Supreme Court of the United States decided that not everyone with any sort of physical problem is per se "disabled" under the Americans with Disabilities Act – rather, people must prove they are disabled by showing that their problem substantially affects a major life activity. As well, such an effect could be mitigated by medicine or devices, and the body's own ability to correct itself.

== 2000s ==
- 2000 – The Developmental Disabilities Assistance and Bill of Rights Act of 2000 became law.
- 2001 – Board of Trustees of the University of Alabama v. Garrett, 531 U.S. 356 (2001), was a United States Supreme Court case about Congress's enforcement powers under the Fourteenth Amendment to the United States Constitution. The Supreme Court decided that Title I of the Americans with Disabilities Act was unconstitutional, insofar as it allowed states to be sued by private citizens for money damages.
- 2001 – The Commonwealth of Virginia House of Delegates approved a resolution expressing regret for its eugenics practices between 1924 and 1979.
- 2001 – Detectable warnings for pedestrian curb cuts were suspended for study in 1994, and became officially required in 2001.
- 2001 – The United States District Court for the Southern District of Texas found that the Texas Department of Corrections was in compliance on the issue of use of force against inmates and had adequate policies and procedures in place. However, the court continued to have issues with the "current and ongoing constitutional violations regarding administrative segregation [in] the conditions of confinement and the practice of using administrative segregation to house mentally ill inmates" that it found.
- 2001 – In PGA Tour, Inc. v. Martin (00-24) 532 U.S. 661, the U.S. Supreme Court ruled that Title III of the Americans with Disabilities Act, by its plain terms, prohibited the PGA from denying Casey Martin equal access to its tours on the basis of his disability (a degenerative circulatory disorder preventing him from walking golf courses) and that allowing Martin to use a golf cart, despite the walking rule, was not a modification that would "fundamentally alter the nature" of the game.
- 2001 – Penry v. Johnson, 532 U.S. 782 (2001), is a United States Supreme Court case which concerned whether instructions given to a Texas jury were constitutionally adequate to emphasize the mitigating factors in sentencing of intellectual disability. The Texas courts had determined the sentencing instructions were consistent with prior Supreme Court jurisprudence, but the Court in a divided decision reversed, finding the sentencing instructions insufficient. This was the second time Penry's case made it to the Supreme Court.
- 2002 – On May 2, 2002, Virginia Governor Mark R. Warner issued a statement expressing "profound regret for the commonwealth's role in the eugenics movement," specifically naming Virginia's 1924 compulsory sterilization legislation, which includes though is not limited to the Virginia Sterilization Act of 1924.
- 2002 – Toyota Motor Manufacturing, Kentucky, Inc. v. Williams, 534 U.S. 184 (2002), was a case in which the Supreme Court of the United States interpreted the meaning of the phrase "substantially impairs" as used in the Americans with Disabilities Act of 1990. It reversed the decision by the Court of Appeals to grant a partial summary judgment in favor of the respondent, Ella Williams, that had qualified her inability to perform manual job-related tasks as a disability.
- 2002 – In Atkins v. Virginia, 536 U.S. 304 (2002), the U. S. Supreme Court ruled 6–3 that executing mentally disabled people violates the Eighth Amendment's ban on cruel and unusual punishment.
- 2002 – Carol Carr, an American woman from the state of Georgia, became the center of a widely publicized debate over euthanasia when in 2002 she killed her two adult sons because they had Huntington's disease. Carr pleaded guilty to assisted suicide and was sentenced to 5 years in prison. After serving 21 months, she was released on parole in 2004. The parole board mandated that if Carr's surviving son, James, should become ill with Huntington's disease, she will be prohibited from serving as his primary caregiver. They also stipulated that Carr must receive mental-health counseling during her period of supervision. Carol's youngest son, James Scott, was diagnosed with Huntington's in 2005. Carr was not allowed to be his caregiver.
- 2002 – Access Now, Inc. v. Southwest Airlines Co. was a decision of the United States District Court on 18 August 2002. It concerned the nature of Title III of Americans with Disabilities Act of 1990. The court determined that Southwest Airlines website is not a "place of public accommodation" as defined in Title III of the Americans with Disabilities Act of 1990. The case determined that the Southwest Airlines internet website was not in violation of the Americans with Disabilities Act of 1990 as Americans with Disabilities Act (ADA) is concerned with physical existences and hence cannot govern things that are in cyberspace. Judge Seitz also explained that the "virtual ticket counter" Southwest Airlines Co's website was a virtual construct and hence not a "public place of accommodation" and as such "To expand the ADA to cover "virtual" spaces would be to create new rights without well-defined standards".
- 2002 – The New Freedom Commission on Mental Health was established by U.S. President George W. Bush through Executive Order 13263 on April 29, 2002 to conduct a comprehensive study of the U.S. mental health service delivery system and make recommendations based on its findings. The commission has been touted as part of his commitment to eliminate inequality for Americans with disabilities. Opponents of the plan questioned the motives of the commission, largely from a civil liberties perspective, asserting the initiative campaign was little more than a thinly veiled proxy for the pharmaceutical industry, which, in its pursuit of profits, is too eager to foster psychotropic medication interventions. Some opponents contended that its objectives are to foster chemical behavior control of American citizens. However, no commission recommendations specifically called for increased drug use and the commission did call for closer scrutiny of psychiatric drug treatment, months before the Food and Drug Administration (FDA) started taking these steps in the wake of reports of increased rates of suicide, especially during the first months of drug use.
- 2002 – The Help America Vote Act (HAVA) became law in the U.S., and it required voting "systems" to be accessible for all those with disabilities, including special assistance for blind or otherwise visually impaired voters.
- 2002 – A New York County Court authorized the sterilization of an intellectually disabled woman who gave informed consent to the procedure.
- 2002 – Laura's Law is a California state law that allows for court-ordered assisted outpatient treatment. To qualify for the program, the person must have a serious mental illness plus a recent history of psychiatric hospitalizations, jailings or acts, threats or attempts of serious violent behavior towards [self] or others. A complete functional outline of the legal procedures and safeguards within Laura's Law has been prepared by NAMI San Mateo. The measure passed the California Legislature in 2002 and was signed into law by Governor Gray Davis. The statute can only be utilized in counties that choose to enact outpatient commitment programs based on the measure. As of 2010, Nevada County has fully implemented the law and Los Angeles County has a pilot project.
- 2002 – Kansas v. Crane, 534 U.S. 407 (2002) is a United States Supreme Court case in which the Court upheld the Kansas Sexually Violent Predator Act (SVPA) as consistent with substantive due process. The Court clarified that its earlier holding in Kansas v. Hendricks did not set forth a requirement of total or complete lack of control, but noted that the Constitution does not permit commitment of a sex offender without some lack-of-control determination.
- 2002 - Decided by the US Supreme Court in 2002, the case US Airways, Inc. v. Barnett held that even requests for accommodation due to disability that might seem reasonable on their face, e.g., a transfer to a different position, can be rendered unreasonable because it would require a violation of the company's seniority system. While the court held that, in general, a violation of a seniority system renders an otherwise reasonable accommodation unreasonable, a plaintiff can present evidence that, despite the seniority system, the accommodation is reasonable in the specific case at hand, e.g., the plaintiff could offer evidence that the seniority system is so often disregarded that another exception wouldn't make a difference. Importantly, the court held that the defendant need not provide proof that this particular application of the seniority system should prevail, and that, once the defendant showed that the accommodation violated the seniority system, it fell to Barnett to show it was nevertheless reasonable.
- 2003 - Max Starkloff and his wife Colleen began the Starkloff Disability Institute in downtown St. Louis, which sought to work with employers in hiring disabled people.
- 2003 – The U.S. Supreme Court decision Sell v. United States imposed stringent limits on the right of a lower court to order the forcible administration of antipsychotic medication to a criminal defendant who had been determined to be incompetent to stand trial for the sole purpose of making them competent and able to be tried.
- 2003 – On September 17, 2003, the Free Our People March ended, with marchers arriving in the nation's capitol from Pennsylvania, to advocate for MiCASSA, full implementation of the U.S. Supreme Court's Olmstead v. L.C. decision, Money Following the Person legislation, and Medicaid reform other than block grants.
- 2003 – In Hornstine v. Township of Moorestown Blair Hornstine, then a high school senior, successfully sued her school district, which had said she was able to get a higher grade point average because she had been home-schooled at times because of an immune-system illness and, as a result, had taken more advanced placement courses and fewer low-rated physical education courses. Arguing that she had the highest grades and should not have to share the top honors in her class, Blair won the right to be sole valedictorian.
- 2003 – The Disability History Association was founded; it is an affiliated society of the American History Association.
- 2003 – On February 10, 2003, United States Department of Health and Human Services secretary Tommy Thompson announced a limited program in Alabama that would fund in-home services for Nick Dupree and 29 others who were turning 21 shortly; previously Dupree had organized "Nick's Crusade", a campaign which attempted to gain continued in-home services for Alabamians with disabilities who are over the age of 21.
- 2004 – The Assistive Technology Act of 2004 required states to provide direct aid to individuals with disabilities to ensure they have access to the technology they need. As a result, the majority of state efforts are required to be conducted in the following areas: assistive technology reutilization programs, assistive technology demonstration programs, alternative financing programs and device loan programs.
- 2004 – On October 30, 2004, President George W. Bush signed into law the "Special Olympics Sport and Empowerment Act," Public Law 108-406. The bill authorized funding for its Healthy Athletes, Education, and Worldwide Expansion programs.
- 2004 – Hangarter v. Provident Insurance Company, 373 F.3d 998 (9th Cir. 2004), (UnumProvident, now referred to as Unum or Unum Group), is a landmark decision by the 9th Circuit Court of Appeals on the issue of disability bad faith insurance law. Because California's bad faith insurance law is often referred to in many states as a model nationwide, the 9th Circuit's decision has a persuasive impact throughout the country. Affirming in part and reversing in part the district court's opinion in Hangarter v. Paul Revere Life Insurance Company, the 9th Circuit ruled the defendant insurance company, UnumProvident, engaged in biased and bad faith claims handling and investigation. This case marked a milestone victory for disabled claimants who were rejected because disability insurers were basing their decisions on an improper definition of total disability. The 9th Circuit made it clear that California law controls the definition of this crucial phrase in disability policies. Hangarter v. Provident is also a landmark decision in the area of admissibility of expert testimony, under the Daubert factors laid out by the Supreme Court. With experts on insurance claims practices, the Daubert factors will not preclude the kind of testimony whose reliability depends on the knowledge and experience of the expert, rather than the theory or technical framework behind it. Hangarter gave several important findings of law that aid disabled claimants. First, futile attempts to return to an occupation are insufficient to reverse a jury's determination of total disability under California law. Total disability may still be found, even if an insured was able to do some work under her occupation. The guiding focus is whether an insured was unable to perform the substantial and material duties of her own occupation in the usual and customary way with reasonable continuity. Second, the 9th Circuit affirmed that recovery under total disability is not precluded because an insured was able to generate income during her disability. Disability insurance is designed not as insurance against loss of income, but as a substitute for earnings when an insured is deprived of the capacity to earn an income. Third, repeated use of a medical examiner overcomes any presumption that an insurance company's denial of a claim is a genuine dispute. The practice of using the same medical examiner when claims are being rejected evinces bad faith on the part of the insurance company.
- 2004 – The Individuals with Disabilities Education Improvement Act of 2004 (IDEA 2004) became law; it is a United States law that mandates equity, accountability and excellence in education for children with disabilities.
- 2004 – Archuleta v. Hedrick, 365 F.3d 644 (8th Cir. 2004) was a pro se petition for a writ of habeas corpus filed in the U.S. Court of Appeals for the Eighth Circuit in October 2002, appealing the dismissal of a case brought by defendant Benjamin Archuleta. Archuleta had been found not guilty by reason of insanity of assault and subsequently ordered to be confined in a prison mental hospital by the United States District Court for the Western District of Missouri after his successful insanity defense, as he was evaluated by a psychiatrist as dangerous. His appeal challenged this confinement and "forced treatment", requested a withdrawal of his original insanity defense, and sought his unconditional release from custody. The appellate court reversed the lower court's dismissal of the habeas corpus petition, saying that habeas corpus is a last resort remedy available to those without any other, and the case was remanded back to that court with the instructions to transfer the petition to another district court, the United States District Court for the District of Utah.
- 2004 – Jesse Koochin was a 6-year-old American boy who became the center of a legal battle between his parents, Steve and Gayle Koochin, and Primary Children's Medical Center in Salt Lake City. On September 15, 2004, Jesse developed respiratory problems and was taken to Primary Children's Medical Center in Salt Lake City and placed on a ventilator. On October 8, "his tumor pushed his brain stem down through the skull," and he was in an unresponsive coma. Subsequently, two physicians independently examined him on October 11 and 12 and determined that the child was brain dead. The hospital informed his parents that they would order life support removed within 24 hours. However, the Koochins rejected the hospital's definition of death. Instead, relying on traditional notions of cardiopulmonary death, they filed for an immediate restraining order to keep Koochin on a ventilator and to receive other treatment. They declared that he had been in a "similar coma" from May 23, 2004 to July 11, 2004 and had successfully awakened, and also claimed that the hospital staff did not perform an EEG exam or cerebral perfusion study to test for brain activity. The Utah judge granted the restraining order on October 13 and ruled that the hospital would be allowed to declare him brain dead without performing the two tests. On October 15, the parents removed the brain-dead child from the hospital and put him under hospice care at their temporary home in Salt Lake City. Koochin's heart ultimately stopped beating on November 19, 2004. The landmark case was the first documented instance in the United States in which parents attempted to opt out of legally accepted standards of death.
- 2004 – Ewing v. Goldstein 15 Cal. Rptr. 3d 864 (Cal. Ct. App. 2004) is a landmark court case that extended California mental health professional's duty to protect identifiable victims of potentially violent persons, as established by Tarasoff v. Regents of the University of California, to include acting upon communications from third parties that indicate a possible threat.
- 2004 – In Tennessee v. Lane, the U.S. Supreme Court ruled that the Americans with Disabilities Act did not violate the sovereign immunity doctrine of the 11th Amendment when, based on Congress's 14th Amendment enforcement powers of the Due Process clause, it allowed individuals to sue states for denying them services based on their disabilities. The Court held that Congress had sufficiently demonstrated the problems faced by disabled persons who sought to exercise fundamental rights protected by the Due Process clause of the 14th Amendment (such as access to a court). The Court also emphasized that the remedies required from the states were not unreasonable – they just had to make reasonable accommodations to allow disabled persons to exercise their fundamental rights. The Court thus held that because Title II of the Americans with Disabilities Act was a "reasonable prophylactic measure, reasonably targeted to a legitimate end," and because Congress had the authority under the 14th Amendment to regulate the actions of the states to accomplish that end, the law was constitutional.
- 2004 – The first Chicago Disability Pride Parade was the first Disability Pride Parade in the United States after the Boston-based parades of the 1990s. It was held on July 18, 2004. The first Chicago parade was funded with $10,000 in seed money that Sarah Triano received in 2003 as part of the Paul G. Hearne Leadership award from the American Association of People with Disabilities. According to Triano, fifteen hundred people attended the parade. Yoshiko Dart was the parade marshal.
- 2005 – The California Mental Health Services Act (MHSA) became California law in 2005 after the voters passed Proposition 63. Funded through a 1 percent tax on personal incomes in excess of $1 million, the MHSA established a broad continuum of community-based prevention, early intervention, and other services for Californians with severe mental illnesses. The California Department of Mental Health administers the act, and counties and their contracted agencies provide the direct consumer services.
- 2005 – In Spector v. Norwegian Cruise Line Ltd., the U.S. Supreme Court held that Title III of the Americans with Disabilities Act applied to foreign-flagged cruise ships in U.S. waters.
- 2005 – The Terri Schiavo case was a right-to-die legal case in the United States from 1990 to 2005, involving Theresa Marie "Terri" Schiavo (December 3, 1963 – March 31, 2005), a woman in an irreversible persistent vegetative state. Schiavo's husband and legal guardian argued that Schiavo would not have wanted prolonged artificial life support without the prospect of recovery, and elected to remove her feeding tube. Schiavo's parents disputed her husband's assertions and challenged Schiavo's medical diagnosis, arguing in favor of continuing artificial nutrition and hydration. The highly publicized and prolonged series of legal challenges presented by her parents, which ultimately involved state and federal politicians up to the level of President George W. Bush, caused a seven-year delay before Schiavo's feeding tube was ultimately removed in 2005, after which she died that same year.
- 2005 – Peggy S. Salters, from South Carolina, became the first survivor of electroshock treatment in the United States to win a jury verdict and a large money judgment ($635,177) in compensation for extensive permanent amnesia and cognitive disability caused by the procedure.
- 2005 – In Campbell v. General Dynamics Government Systems Corp., the First Circuit Court of the U.S. had to consider the enforceability of a mandatory arbitration agreement, contained in a dispute resolution policy linked to an e-mailed company-wide announcement, insofar as it applied to employment discrimination claims brought under the Americans with Disabilities Act. Under the Court's analysis, the question turned on whether the employer provided minimally sufficient notice of the contractual nature of the e-mailed policy and of the concomitant waiver of an employee's right to access a judicial forum. The Court weighed the attendant circumstances and concluded that the notice was wanting and that, therefore, enforcement of the waiver would be inappropriate; thus the Court upheld the district court's denial of the employer's motion to stay proceedings and compel the employee to submit his claim to arbitration. The case is a principal case in the Rothstein, Liebman employment law casebook.
- 2005 – On November 14, 2005, the U.S. Supreme Court held in Schaffer v. Weast, 546 U.S. 49, that it is the party which requests a hearing under the Individuals with Disabilities Education Act who has the burden of proof in such an action.
- 2005 – The Sun Hudson case concerned Wanda Hudson and her infant son, who in 2005 was allowed to die via removal of his breathing tube, contrary to her wishes.
- 2005 – Spiro Nikolouzos was a Texas man incapacitated from bleeding related to a cerebral shunt, whose care was the subject of an appeal of The Texas Futile Care Law. Nikolouzos was hospitalized on February 10, 2005, at St. Luke's Episcopal Hospital, Houston, Texas, and was in a persistent vegetative state. He was fed through a gastric feeding tube and respirated by a ventilator. The hospital wished to discontinue life support, allowing Nikolouzos to die. His family opposed this action and claimed the hospital's decision was related to the fact that Nikolouzos's Medicare funding was running out, a contention denied by the hospital. Under the 1999 Advance Directives Act (also known as The Texas Futile Care Law), the hospital may override the family's wishes in such a matter should an ethics committee clear such an action. However, Nikolouzos's family won an emergency injunction preventing the removal of the life support apparatus, and on March 21, 2005, Spiro Nikolouzos was removed to Avalon Place Nursing Home in San Antonio, Texas. Avalon Place had rejected his application nine days earlier. Nikolouzos subsequently died at Avalon on May 30, 2005. The precedent set by the case of Sun Hudson may have helped to expedite the removal of Nikolouzos from artificial respiration prior to the move.
- 2005 – In Bigby v. Dretke 402 F.3d 551 (5th Cir. 2005), the U.S. Court of Appeals for the Fifth Circuit struck down jury instructions in death penalty cases that do not ask about mitigating factors including a consideration of the defendant's social, medical, and psychological history, saying that the jury must be instructed to consider mitigating factors even when answering unrelated questions. This ruling suggests that an expanded explanation including these factors be given in the jury instructions to insure the jury weighs all the mitigating factors. This ruling also established that a defendant's mental disorder must be considered as a mitigating factor in sentencing in a death penalty case, even if mental illness was not brought up in the trial.
- 2005 - In 2005 Tatyana McFadden and Deborah McFadden filed suit against the Howard County Public School System and won the right for Tatyana to race in her wheelchair at the same time as her school's runners starting in 2006, though her score would not be counted for her team.
- 2006 – On April 19, 2006, it was announced that after nearly 5 years, Duane Reade, a chain of drugstores primarily located in New York City, finally agreed to settle with Disabled In Action to make all of its stores ADA-compliant.
- 2006 – The Ashley Treatment refers to a controversial set of medical procedures undergone by a disabled Seattle child, "Ashley X". Ashley, born in 1997, had severe developmental disabilities due to static encephalopathy of unknown etiology; she was assumed to be at an infant level mentally and physically. The treatment included growth attenuation via estrogen therapy; hysterectomy, bilateral breast bud removal, and appendectomy. The principal purpose of the treatment was to improve Ashley's quality of life by limiting her growth in size, eliminating menstrual cramps and bleeding, and preventing discomfort from large breasts. In July 2004, Ashley had a hysterectomy (to prevent menstruation) and surgical removal of her nascent breast buds (to prevent development). She also underwent an appendectomy. The surgery was performed at Seattle's Children's Hospital and Regional Medical Center. In addition, in December 2006 she completed estrogen therapy through dermal patches, which sped up the natural closure of her growth plates. The combination of the surgery and the estrogen therapy attracted much public comment and ethical analysis in early 2007, both supportive and condemning.
- 2006 - The Combating Autism Act of 2006 (Public Law No: 109-416) is an Act of Congress public law that was passed by the 109th United States Congress (Senate Bill 843) and was signed into law by President of the United States George W. Bush on December 19, 2006. It authorized nearly one billion dollars in expenditures over five years, starting in 2007, for screening, education, early intervention, prompt referrals for treatment and services, and research of the autism spectrum disorders of autism, Asperger syndrome, Rett syndrome, childhood disintegrative disorder, and pervasive developmental disorder - not otherwise specified (commonly referred to as PDD-NOS).
- 2006 - Timothy's Law is the reference used for a New York state statute signed into law on December 22, 2006 by Governor George E. Pataki which took effect January 1, 2007. The law requires that health plans sold in the state provide comparable coverage for mental health ailments as it does for physical ailments. This is often referred to as mental health parity.
- 2006 – World Down Syndrome Day (WDSD) is marked each year on March 21, beginning in 2006. The 21st day of March (the 3rd month of the year) was selected to signify the uniqueness of the triplication (trisomy) of the 21st chromosome which causes Down syndrome.
- 2006 – National Federation of the Blind v. Target Corp., 452 F.Supp.2d 946 (2006), was a class action lawsuit in the United States that was filed on February 7, 2006 in the Superior Court of California for the County of Alameda, and subsequently moved to federal court. The case challenged whether the Americans with Disabilities Act of 1990, specifically Title III's provisions prohibiting discrimination by "places of public accommodation" (42 U.S.C. 12181 et seq) apply to websites and/ or the Internet, or are restricted to physical places. The plaintiff, National Federation of the Blind (NFB), sued Target Corporation, a national retail chain, claiming that blind people were unable to access much of the information on the defendant's website, nor purchase anything from its website independently. On September 7, 2006, the court ordered that a retailer may be sued if its website is inaccessible to the blind. In the court's opinion, Judge Marilyn Hall Patel explained that the order of the court was based upon "42 U.S. Code § 12182", the prohibition of discrimination by public accommodations clause of the Americans with Disabilities Act of 1990, which prohibits discrimination in the "enjoyment of goods, services, facilities or privileges."
- 2006 – In United States v. Georgia, the U.S. Supreme Court decided that the protection of the Americans with Disabilities Act extends to persons held in a state prison and protects prison inmates from discrimination on the basis of disability by prison personnel. Specifically, the court held that title II of the Americans with Disabilities Act of 1990, 42 U.S.C. §§ 12131–12165., was a proper use of Congressional power under the Fourteenth Amendment, Section 5, making it applicable to prison system officials.
- 2006 - Following a lawsuit under the Americans with Disabilities Act, FedExField added caption screens in 2006.
- 2007 – A psychiatric patient in the Creedmoor Psychiatric Center in New York, given the pseudonym of Simone D., won a court ruling which set aside a two-year-old court order to give her electroshock treatment against her will.
- 2007 - In May 2007, Hotels.com was subject to a class action complaint (Smith v. Hotels.com L.P., California Superior Court, Alameda County, Case No. RG07327029) brought against them for "ongoing discrimination against persons with mobility disabilities who desire to, but cannot, use Hotels.com’s worldwide reservation network to make reservations for hotel rooms". The company denied the accusation and opposed the action, but was found guilty on one count of infringing California's Unruh Civil Rights Act, and on one count in violation of Unfair Competition Law. It was agreed that the company would provide suitable accessibility information about hotels sold on its website.
- 2007 - Green v. State of California, No. S137770 (Cal. Aug. 23, 2007) was a case in which the majority of the Supreme Court in California was faced with deciding whether the employee suing the state is required to prove they are able to perform "essential" job duties, regardless of whether or not there was "reasonable accommodation," or if the employer must prove the person suing was unable to do so. The court ruled the burden was on the employee, not the employer, and reversed a disputed decision by the courts. Plaintiff attorney David Greenberg brought forth considerations of the concept that, even in the state of California, employers do not have to employ a worker who is unable to perform "essential job functions" with "reasonable accommodation." Forcing employers to do so "would defy logic and establish a poor public policy in employment matters."
- 2007 – A decision by the Colorado Court of Appeals in People v. Grant upheld a lower court ruling that did not allow expert testimony on the defendant's state of mind due to voluntary intoxication, thus ruling out any possibility that the issue of "settled insanity" might be raised.
- 2007 – On May 21, 2007 the U.S. Supreme Court held in Winkelman v. Parma City School District, 550 U.S. 516, that parents have independent enforceable rights under the Individuals with Disabilities Education Act and may appear pro se on behalf of their children.
- 2007 – Jonathan's Law is the "popular name" of the amendments to New York Mental Hygiene Law Article 33. Jonathan's Law, a New York statute, was signed into law in May 2007; it entitles parents and legal guardians access to all child abuse investigation files and medical history records. The legislative measure is intended to hold residential mental health facilities accountable by requiring notification of guardians in cases of ill treatment, and requires written reports of ensuing investigations. Mike and Lisa Carey, the parents of Jonathan Carey, promoted Jonathan's Law. Jonathan Carey, who had severe autism, was abused and neglected at school and later killed by a direct care worker.
- 2007 – Panetti v. Quarterman, 551 U.S. 930 (2007), is a decision by the Supreme Court of the United States, ruling that criminal defendants sentenced to death may not be executed if they do not understand the reason for their imminent execution, and that once the state has set an execution date death-row inmates may litigate their competency to be executed in habeas corpus proceedings.
- 2007 – Doe ex. rel. Tarlow v. District of Columbia, 489 F.3d 376 (D.C. Cir. 2007), is a decision of the United States Court of Appeals for the District of Columbia Circuit, written by Circuit Judge Brett Kavanaugh, in which the Court upheld a 2003 District of Columbia statute that stated the conditions for authorizing a non-emergency surgical procedure on a mentally incompetent person. This case developed out of an appeal to a district court decision that was brought on behalf of a mentally incompetent patient who was subjected to an abortion without her consent and another patient who was subjected to an eye surgery without the patient's consent. Under the Appellate Court's interpretation of the statute, a court located in the District of Columbia, must apply the "best interest of the patient" standard to a person who was never competent, and the court must apply the "known wishes of the patient" standard to a person who was once competent. The appellate decision was remanded back to the District Court.
- 2007 – Michigan Paralyzed Veterans of America v. The University of Michigan, begun in 2007, was a case filed before The United States District Court for the Eastern District of Michigan Southern Division on behalf of the Michigan Paralyzed Veterans of America against University of Michigan – Michigan Stadium claiming that Michigan Stadium violated the Americans with Disabilities Act in its $226-million renovation by failing to add enough seats for disabled fans or accommodate the needs for disabled restrooms, concessions and parking. Additionally, the distribution of the accessible seating was at issue, with nearly all the seats being provided in the end-zone areas. The suit was settled in March 2008. The settlement required the stadium to add 329 wheelchair seats throughout the stadium by 2010, and an additional 135 accessible seats in clubhouses to go along with the existing 88 wheelchair seats. This case was significant because it set a precedent for the uniform distribution of accessible seating and gave the DOJ the opportunity to clarify previously unclear rules. The agreement now is a blueprint for all stadiums and other public facilities regarding accessibility.
- 2007 – Legislation enacted in Idaho designated every October as Disability History Month.
- 2007 – The Individuals with Disabilities Education Act (IDEA) requires the U.S. states to provide students with disabilities a "free appropriate public education." Because the New York City Department of Education did not have an "Individualized Education Program" for former Viacom executive Tom Freston's son Gilbert, Freston enrolled his son in the Stephen Gaynor School, a private school for special needs students. The school district reimbursed Freston for tuition to the school. Two years later the school district offered a place for Gilbert at a different public school. Freston declined the offer and again sought reimbursement for private school tuition. A United States district court ruled that because Gilbert had never been enrolled in public school, IDEA did not require the school district to reimburse Freston. As Oyez notes, the IDEA act "authorizes reimbursement for a child 'who previously received special education and related services under the authority of a public agency,' but it does not explicitly state that parents of children who have never received public education are not entitled to reimbursement." The U.S. Court of Appeals for the Second Circuit vacated the decision of the district court on August 9, 2006, reasoning by comparing the disputed section of the act with other sections that IDEA was not intended to deny reimbursement for students never enrolled in public school. The court held that upholding the district court ruling would require parents to enroll their children in inadequate public schools as a condition of eligibility for tuition reimbursement. The school district appealed to the Supreme Court in a November 3, 2006 petition for a writ of certiorari. The Supreme Court granted certiorari on February 26, 2007. Later that year in New York City Board of Education v. Tom F. the Supreme Court ruled in favor of Tom.
- 2008 – The Washington, D.C. District Court decided that the Treasury must "take such steps as may be required to provide meaningful access to United States currency for blind and other visually impaired persons," siding with the American Council of the Blind.
- 2008 – In the state of Washington, October is a statutorily designated civic holiday called Disability History Month; the bill establishing the holiday passed the state legislature in 2008 and is codified in Title 28A of the Revised Code of Washington in 2008. In addition to the ceremonial designation, the law also requires that "each public school shall conduct or promote educational activities that provide instruction, awareness, and understanding of disability history and people with disabilities".
- 2008 – The Illinois Appellate Court held that in determining a petition for the sterilization of an incompetent ward, a court should apply the substituted consent standard if there is clear and convincing evidence regarding how the ward would decide if the ward were competent; however, the court should apply the best interest of the patient standard if the ward's substituted judgment cannot be proven by clear and convincing evidence.
- 2008 – The Genetic Information Nondiscrimination Act of 2008 (Pub. L. 110–233 (text) (PDF), 122 Stat. 881, enacted May 21, 2008, GINA) became law in the U.S. The Act prohibits group health plans and health insurers from denying coverage to a healthy individual or charging that person higher premiums based solely on a genetic predisposition to developing a disease in the future. The legislation also bars employers from using individuals' genetic information when making hiring, firing, job placement, or promotion decisions.
- 2008 – The ADA Amendments Act of 2008 became law, and it broadened the scope of who is considered disabled under the law, and when considering whether a person is disabled, the law required that people ignore the beneficial effects of any mitigating measures (except ordinary eyeglasses and contact lenses) the person uses; furthermore, when considering whether a person is substantially limited in a major life activity, which would make them disabled under the law, the law required the consideration of bodily functions as well as other major life activities, and having one major life activity substantially limited is enough; when considering whether a person whose condition is episodic or in remission is substantially limited in a major life activity, the law required the consideration of the person's limitations as they are when the condition is in an active state; furthermore, determining someone is disabled under the law does not require individuals to meet the substantially-limited-in-a-major-life-activity standard, but does not include impairments that are transitory and minor.
- 2008 – The Paul Wellstone and Pete Domenici Mental Health Parity and Addiction Equity Act became law in the U.S., and it required that if a group health plan includes medical/surgical benefits and MH/SUD (mental health/substance abuse) benefits, the financial requirements (e.g., deductibles and co-payments) and treatment limitations (e.g., number of visits or days of coverage) that apply to MH/SUD benefits must be no more restrictive than the predominant financial requirements or treatment limitations that apply to substantially all medical/surgical benefits; MH/SUD benefits may not be subject to any separate cost-sharing requirements or treatment limitations that only apply to such benefits; if a group health plan includes medical/surgical benefits and MH/SUD benefits, and the plan provides for out-of-network medical/surgical benefits, it must provide for out-of-network MH/SUD benefits; and standards for medical necessity determinations and reasons for any denial of benefits relating to MH/SUD benefits must be disclosed upon request. However, this law does not apply to small group health plans.
- 2008 – Indiana v. Edwards, 554 U.S. 164 (2008), was a United States Supreme Court case in which the Court held that the standard for competency to stand trial was not linked to the standard for competency to represent oneself.
- 2008 - The Maryland Fitness and Athletics Equity for Students with Disabilities Act became law, which made Maryland the first state to require schools to provide equal physical education and athletic opportunities for students with disabilities. It is called Tatyana's Law.
- 2008 - Kentucky Retirement Systems v. EEOC, 554 U.S. 135 (2008) is a United States Supreme Court case that ruled Kentucky's retirement system does not amount to age discrimination under the Age Discrimination in Employment Act when granting pensions to disabled persons who had not yet reached the permitted retirement age of 55.
- 2008 - Section 10(g) of the Cook Islands Disability Act 2008 prohibits discrimination against disabled persons based on their sexual orientation.
- 2009 – The Matthew Shepard and James Byrd Jr. Hate Crimes Prevention Act became law in the U.S., and it expanded the definition of federal hate crime to include those violent crimes in which the victim is selected due to their actual or perceived disability; previously federal hate crimes were defined as only those violent crimes where the victim is selected due to their race, color, religion, or national origin.
- 2009 – The Christopher and Dana Reeve Paralysis Act became law in the U.S. It was the first piece of comprehensive legislation aimed at improving the lives of Americans living with paralysis; it created new coordinated research activities through the National Institutes of Health to search for a cure for paralysis, and promotes enhanced rehabilitation services for Americans living with paralysis.
- 2009 – Forest Grove School District v. T. A., 557 U.S. 230 (2009), is a case in which the United States Supreme Court held that the Individuals with Disabilities Education Act (IDEA) authorizes reimbursement for private special education services when a public school fails to provide a "free appropriate public education" (FAPE) and the private school placement is appropriate, regardless of whether the child previously received special education services through the public school.
- 2009 – Section 3A1.1 of the 2009 United States Sentencing Guidelines states that: "If the finder of fact at trial or, in the case of a plea of guilty or nolo contendere, the court at sentencing determines beyond a reasonable doubt that the defendant intentionally selected any victim or any property as the object of the offense of conviction because of the actual or perceived race, color, religion, national origin, ethnicity, gender, disability, or sexual orientation of any person," the sentencing court is required to increase the standard sentencing range.

== 2010s ==
- 2010 – The 21st Century Communications and Video Accessibility Act, known as CVAA, was signed into law. It requires that unedited, full-length programs shown on TV with captions must also be captioned when they are made available online, with more requirements to be phased in at later dates.
- 2010 – Rosa's Law, which changed references in many federal statutes that referred to "mental retardation" to make them refer, instead, to "intellectual disability", became law in the U.S.
- 2010 – The Patient Protection and Affordable Care Act became law. Due to this law, since 2012 companies cannot drop a person's coverage when they get sick due to a mistake the person made on their application, or put a lifetime cap on how much care they will pay for if a person gets sick, and since 2014 companies cannot deny coverage based on preexisting conditions, or put an annual cap on how much care they will pay for if a person gets sick.
- 2010 – In United States v. Comstock, 560 U.S. 126 (2010), the Supreme Court of the United States ruled that the federal government may order the civil commitment of a mentally ill, sexually dangerous person beyond the conclusion of their federal sentence.
- 2011 - The case Hiltibran et al v. Levy et al in the United States District Court for the Western District of Missouri resulted in that court issuing an order in 2011. That order requires incontinence briefs funded by Medicaid to be given by Missouri to adults who would be institutionalized without them.
- 2011 - In Ouellette v. Viacom International Inc. (2011) the United States District Court for the District of Montana held that a mere online presence does not subject a website to the Americans with Disabilities Act of 1990 guidelines. Thus Myspace and YouTube were not liable for a dyslexic man's inability to navigate the site regardless of how impressive the "online theater" is.
- 2011 – The Joseph Maraachli case refers to an international controversy over the life of Joseph Maraachli, commonly known as Baby Joseph, a Canadian infant who was diagnosed with a rare progressive and incurable neurological disorder called Leigh's disease. After Canadian doctors refused to perform a tracheotomy, calling the procedure invasive and futile, Joseph's parents fought to have him transferred to the United States, arguing that while Joseph's disease was terminal, a tracheotomy would extend his life and allow him to die at home. After several months and efforts by American anti-abortion groups, Joseph was transferred to a Catholic hospital in St. Louis, Missouri, where the procedure was performed in 2011. The successfully-obtained procedure extended Joseph's life for several months. Joseph died in 2011, at his home.
- 2011 – On March 15, 2011, new Americans with Disabilities Act rules came into effect. These rules expanded accessibility requirements for recreational facilities such as swimming pools, golf courses, exercise clubs, and boating facilities. They also set standards for the use of wheelchairs and other mobility devices like Segways in public spaces, and changed the standards for things such as selling tickets to events and reserving accessible hotel rooms. The new rules also clearly defined "service animal" as "...any dog that is individually trained to do work or perform tasks for the benefit of an individual with a disability, including a physical, sensory, psychiatric, intellectual, or other mental disability." This portion of the law also states that the services the service animal provides must be "directly related to the handler's disability" and dogs that provide only emotional support or crime deterrence cannot be defined as service animals.
- 2011 – Delaware, in 2011, designated October as "Disability History and Awareness Month".
- 2011 – In Wisconsin, the District II Wisconsin Court of Appeals ruled in 2011 that patients with Alzheimer's disease cannot be involuntary committed under Chapter 51 and can only be involuntarily committed for residential care and custody under Chapter 55. The court left open whether this applies also to persons with a dual diagnosis.
- 2011 – The Broken Arrow City Council, Oklahoma, unanimously voted to create an exotic animal ordinance exemption allowing Christie Carr, who was depressed, to keep her therapy kangaroo within city limits so long as certain conditions were met.
- 2011 – Meyer v. Astrue, 662 F.3d 700 (4th Cir. 2011) was a landmark Social Security Disability Insurance case argued in Federal Court, resolving a conflict within the Circuit over the summary denial of requests for review when new evidence is submitted to the Appeals Council. After suffering severe injuries in an accidental fall, Maurice Eugene Meyer applied for Social Security Disability insurance benefits. An administrative law judge (ALJ) denied his claim, noting that Meyer failed to provide an opinion from his treating physician. When Meyer requested review of his claim by the Appeals Council, he submitted a letter from his treating physician detailing the injuries and recommending significant restrictions on Meyer's activity. The Appeals Council made this letter part of the record but summarily denied Meyer's request for review; thus, the ALJ's decision denying benefits became the final decision of the Commissioner of the Social Security Administration. Meyer appealed, on the grounds that the Appeals Council did wrong in failing to articulate specific findings justifying its denial of his request for review. The court rejected this argument and ruled that the Appeals Council did not have to explain its reasoning when denying review of an ALJ decision, but because in this case the court could not determine if substantial evidence supported the denial of benefits, the court reversed and remanded.
- 2011 – In Virginia Office for Protection and Advocacy v. Stewart, the U.S. Supreme Court ruled that Virginia cannot invoke its sovereign immunity to prevent the Virginia Office for Protection and Advocacy (an independent state agency and member of the National Disability Rights Network) from suing state officials for a court order. In other words, the U.S. Supreme Court ruled Ex Parte Young allows a federal court to hear a lawsuit for prospective relief against state officials brought by another agency of the same state.
- 2011 – The Fair, Accurate, Inclusive, and Respectful Education Act, also known as the FAIR Education Act (Senate Bill 48), which states that California schools must include the contributions of people with disabilities in their textbooks and in teaching of history and social studies classes, became law.
- 2011 – Facilities licensed by the DDS (Department of Developmental Services) in Massachusetts, including but not limited to the Judge Rotenberg Center, were banned from subjecting new admissions to severe behavioral interventions including electric shock, long-term restraint, or aversives that pose risk for psychological harm.
- 2011 – White Cane Safety Day was also named Blind Americans Equality Day by President Barack Obama.
- 2011 – In May 2011 ADAPT organized a protest in Washington, D. C. against changes to Medicaid as part of US Representative Paul Ryan's budget proposal that would have cut Medicaid funding and given more control of the program to the states. Around 100 disability protesters were arrested in D.C., and similar protests led by local ADAPT groups were later held in Chicago, Philadelphia, and Minnesota. Throughout these protests, ADAPT used their Twitter and Facebook feeds to share photos and links to media coverage of the event, which included images of protesters being arrested, to gain and mobilize support from the broader community.
- 2012 – It was announced that by 2014, AMC movie theaters in Illinois would be equipped with captioning services and audio-description devices, available to moviegoers at nearly any movie at an AMC theater in Illinois and at all of a film's listed showings.
- 2012 – In 2012, in Hosanna-Tabor, the Supreme Court faced the ministerial exception for the first time. Writing for the majority, Chief Justice John Roberts affirmed the exception, grounding it in both the Free-Exercise and Establishment Clauses. The majority also found that it applied to the case at hand, barring Cheryl Perich, a teacher, from suing her employer, a Missouri Synod church and school, under the Americans with Disabilities Act (ADA). Although the court declined to adopt a "rigid formula" to determine who is a minister, it found compelling that Ms. Perich (1) was held out as a minister and given a formal ministerial title, (2) had undergone a "significant degree of religious training" in order to obtain that title, (3) held herself out as a minister, even claiming special housing allowances for ministers on her taxes, and (4) performed significant religious functions, including playing "a role in conveying the Church's message and carrying out its mission."
- 2012 – A lawsuit settlement provided that the Colorado Department of Human Services is required to admit a pretrial detainee to the Colorado Mental Health Institute at Pueblo ("CMHIP") within 28 days of the court determining the need for an evaluation or restorative treatment, the Department is required to maintain a monthly average of no more than 24 days for all patients admitted to CMHIP for evaluation or treatment, and competency evaluations performed in county jails must be completed within 30 days.
- 2012 – A lawsuit settlement provided that the Lincoln Center for the Performing Arts in New York would add wheelchair seating and accessible parking and renovate restrooms to make them more accessible.
- 2012 – In September 2012, Home Depot company agreed to pay $100,000 and furnish other relief to settle a disability discrimination lawsuit filed by the US Equal Employment Opportunity Commission, for the alleged failure to provide a reasonable accommodation for a cashier with cancer at its Towson, Maryland, store, and then for purportedly firing her because of her condition.
- 2012 – Illinois Gov. Pat Quinn issued an executive order to increase state oversight of investigations into the deaths of adults with disabilities, because a recent Belleville News-Democrat investigation revealed that, since 2003, the inspector general of the Department of Human Services did not investigate 53 cases called into the agency's hotline about disabled adults living at home who were allegedly abused or neglected and later died.
- 2012 – Gov. Andrew Cuomo and legislative leaders reached a deal to create a new state agency, the Justice Center for the Protection of People With Special Needs, to police abuse and neglect of more than one million New Yorkers with developmental disabilities, mental illnesses, and other conditions that put them at risk. Lawmakers also agreed to expand the state's public disclosure law, requiring thousands of nonprofit groups that provide services to disabled and mentally ill people to make records of abuse and neglect public. The reforms were based on a report by Clarence J. Sundram, Special Advisor to the Governor on Vulnerable Persons, entitled "The Measure of a Society:Protection of Vulnerable Persons in Residential Facilities Against Abuse and Neglect." Some disability activists supported this reform, but others disapproved because they thought investigations should be referred to outside police agencies, not the state. An independent nonprofit group is also being set up to lobby for policy changes for people with disabilities. The group will get powers to conduct its own investigations after complaints and to review documents connected to particular allegations, and that authority is detailed in state law. It will also be given access to group homes and state institutions.
- 2012 – It was announced that Netflix would offer closed captions on all TV and movie content from September 2014 as part of a settlement with a deaf viewer from Massachusetts (Lee Nettles) who sued the company. In 2012, a federal judge in Springfield, Massachusetts ruled in that lawsuit that Netflix and other online providers that serve the public are subject to the federal Americans with Disabilities Act, the first ruling in the country to recognize that Internet-based businesses are covered by the act.
- 2012 – On December 17, 2012, the United States of America filed a lawsuit in the U.S. District Court for the District of Oregon under the Violent Crime Control and Law Enforcement Act of 1994, 42 U.S.C. § 14141 against the City of Portland, alleging improper use-of-force by the Portland Police Bureau against members of a protected class. The U.S. Attorney's Office for the District of Oregon and the Civil Rights Division of the U.S. Department of Justice, sought injunctive and declaratory relief. Based on findings of more than a year of investigation, the complaint alleged Portland police officers engaged in a pattern or practice of unconstitutional use of force against individuals with actual or perceived mental illness. Specifically, the DOJ claimed: (1) Portland police encounters with such individuals too frequently resulted in a higher level force than necessary; (2) Portland police employed Tasers more times than necessary on such individuals, or in circumstances where such force was not justified; and (3) Portland police used a higher degree of force than justified for low level offenses. The case based on this claim, United States v. City of Portland, is notable because of its finding persons with mental illness are primary recipients of police use-of-force.
- 2012 – The Idaho Fish and Game Commission declared that a companion without a tag or permit is allowed to assist a disabled hunter.
- 2012 – In Massachusetts the Appeals Court overturned a decision by a lower court requiring a sterilization and abortion on a woman with "schizophrenia and/or schizoaffective disorder and bipolar mood disorder." The appellate court wrote that the lower court did not follow the due process requirements for a sterilization and the decision to require the abortion was not made using the substituted consent standard. The lower court judge later stated that she required the abortion because she believed that if the patient were healthy she "would elect to abort the pregnancy to protect her own well-being." Rima Kundnani wrote that this case shows how "proper standards must therefore be established to avoid judicial abuse and to protect the reproductive rights of mentally ill women."
- 2012 – A three-judge panel of the U.S. Court of Appeals for the 11th Circuit affirmed that school districts should reimburse parents for independent educational evaluations of students with disabilities, at least in some cases. Though the U.S. Department of Education had long indicated that parents have the right to an independent opinion at public expense under certain circumstance, the Jefferson County Board of Education in Alabama had challenged the rule.
- 2013 – Since January 31, 2013, all existing pools located at "public accommodations" must meet Americans With Disabilities Act standards. This requires the installation of a fixed lift for the pool areas.
- 2013 – Newport News Circuit Court Judge David F. Pugh rejected a guardianship request from the parents of 29-year-old Margaret Jean Hatch, also called Jenny Hatch, that would have allowed them to keep her in a group home against her will.
- 2013 – The 4th District Court of Appeal held that a developmentally disabled adult with "mild mental retardation" may be reproductively sterilized if the court determines there is clear and convincing evidence that the procedure is medically necessary for the patient. The court held that Probate Code section 2357 regulated the patients court order for medical treatment because the sterilization was incidental to acquiring medical care and not the purpose of the medical treatment; alternatively, Probate Code section 1950 et seq. applies when the objective is to prevent the patient from bearing children.
- 2013 – In the case of EEOC v. Hill Country Farms, in a U.S. District Court for the Southern District of Iowa, a jury awarded the U.S. Equal Employment Opportunity Commission damages totaling $240 million – the largest verdict in the EEOC's history – for disability discrimination and severe abuse. The jury agreed with the EEOC that Hill County Farms, doing business as Henry's Turkey Service, subjected 32 men with intellectual disabilities to severe abuse and discrimination for a period between 2007 and 2009, after 20 years of similar mistreatment. However, later in 2013 the jury award for the 32 claimants was reduced to $1.6 million due to statutory damages caps applicable to claims brought under the Americans With Disabilities Act, which, along with the Court's previous award of back wages in the amount of $1.3 million, reduced the total recovery in the case to $2.9 million.
- 2013 – The Iowa Court of Appeals ruled that a girl's tree nut allergy was a protected disability under the Iowa Civil Rights Act, as well as an episodic impairment under the Americans with Disabilities Act.
- 2013 – The U.S. Justice Department said in a settlement with Lesley University in Massachusetts that severe food allergies can be considered disabilities under federal law.
- 2013 – The U.S. First Circuit Court of Appeals in Boston, Massachusetts found that companies can be required to pay long-term disability benefits to a recovering drug addict if the person would face a significant risk of relapse by returning to work. This is believed to be the first time a circuit court said that a risk of relapse into substance abuse can constitute a disability, entitling an employee to long-term benefits, according to the attorney for the plaintiff.
- 2013 – The U.S. Department of Education issued a mandate requiring schools to provide sports for children with disabilities. Specifically, students with disabilities who want to compete in sports for their school can join traditional teams if officials can make "reasonable modifications" to accommodate them. If those adjustments would fundamentally alter a sport or give the student an advantage, the department says schools must create parallel athletic programs that have comparable standing to traditional programs.
- 2013 – Persons with intellectual disabilities, severe physical disabilities, and psychiatric disabilities who opt to apply for a job with the federal government through Schedule A – a hiring authority allowing agencies to appoint a qualified, disabled applicant to a position without competing with the general public – stopped being required to supply a "certification of job readiness" from a medical professional or rehabilitation specialist stating they could perform the job. Under the revised policies, agencies became able to hire after determining that the person is "likely to succeed" in performing the duties of the position, a decision that can be based on any relevant work, educational, or other experience. The new rules also dropped the term "mental retardation" and replaced it with "intellectual disability".
- 2013 – The U.S. Supreme Court blocked North Carolina from trying to take more than $900,000 from a legal settlement won by the family of a 13-year-old girl, identified only as E.M.A, who was seriously injured during her birth that left her severely disabled. Writing for the court, Justice Anthony Kennedy said the state cannot claim a share of the settlement as reimbursement for medical care without determining how much of the settlement is attributable to the care.
- 2013 – Effective July 1, 2013, California Civil Code Section 1938 requires every "commercial property owner or lessor" in California to include on the lease whether the property has been inspected by a Certified Access Specialist (CASp), and if so, whether the CASp did or did not determine whether the property met all applicable construction-related accessibility standards pursuant to Section 55.53.
- 2013 – The U.S. Justice Department said on its website April 22 that it was issuing a new nationwide policy for unrepresented detainees with serious mental disabilities. The Executive Office for Immigration Review will make available a qualified representative to detainees deemed mentally incompetent to represent themselves in immigration proceedings.
- 2013 – North Carolina announced that it would spend $10 million beginning in June 2015 to compensate men and women who were sterilized in the state's eugenics program; North Carolina sterilized 7,600 people from 1929 to 1974 who were deemed socially or mentally unfit.
- 2013 – Airline website pages which have core travel information and services must be accessible to disabled people within two years, the Department of Transportation said, and all pages on airline websites must within three years be readily available to people with disabilities. The new regulations also required airline ticket agents to disclose — and offer — web-based discount fares to customers unable to use their sites due to a disability. Airlines already were required to provide equivalent service for consumers who were unable to use inaccessible websites. Airlines and airports were also required by the new regulations to have to make accessible to disabled people automated kiosks providing boarding passes and baggage tags, as they purchased new equipment. If no new kiosks were installed, 25 percent of the kiosks at each airport location in 2013 were required to be accessible within 10 years. Another new rule gave airlines more flexibility in how they transported manual, folding wheelchairs onboard, making it possible for them to carry up to two wheelchairs in the cabin. In addition to being able to stow a wheelchair in a closet, airlines were also allowed under the new regulations to strap a second chair across a row of seats. Closets also were required to have signs saying wheelchairs have priority over other baggage.
- 2014 – The Iowa Supreme Court held that court approval is required for the sterilization of an incompetent person.
- 2014 – Employees of federal service and concession contractors with disabilities who had been paid less than minimum wage under Section 14(c) of the Fair Labor Standards Act were included in an executive order (signed in 2014) raising the minimum wage for employees of federal service and concession contractors to $10.10 an hour.
- 2014 – The Stephen Beck Jr. Achieving a Better Life Experience Act of 2014 (the ABLE Act) was signed into law. This Act creates a new Section 529A of the Internal Revenue Service Code of 1986 to create tax-free savings accounts (ABLE accounts, also known as 529A plans) for qualified expenses. With these accounts (each person may have only one account) people with disabilities who have a condition that occurred before age 26 can save up to $100,000 without risking eligibility for Supplemental Security Income and other government programs. They can also keep their Medicaid coverage no matter how much money they accrue in their ABLE account. Interest earned on savings will be tax-free. Under current gift-tax limitations as of 2014, as much as $14,000 could be deposited annually. However, each state must put regulations in place so that financial institutions can make the ABLE accounts available, and there is no guarantee a particular state will do so.
- 2014 – The U.S. Justice Department announced that it had entered into a statewide settlement agreement to resolve violations of the Americans with Disabilities Act for approximately 3,250 Rhode Islanders with intellectual and developmental disabilities. Due to this settlement, 2,000 Rhode Islanders with intellectual and developmental disabilities who are being served by segregated programs as of 2014 will have opportunities to work in real jobs at competitive wages. Also, over the next ten years, 1,250 students with intellectual and developmental disabilities will receive services to help transition into the workforce. This was the first statewide settlement in American history to address the rights of people with disabilities to receive state funded employment and daytime services in the broader community, rather than in segregated sheltered workshops and facility-based day programs.
- 2014 – Marlise Nicole Muñoz was an American woman at the center of a medical ethics controversy between November 2013 and January 2014. She had a suspected pulmonary embolism and was declared brain dead. Because she was pregnant, doctors at a Texas hospital kept her body on a ventilator in the intensive care unit despite the determination of brain death. Muñoz's husband entered a legal battle to have her removed from organ support. A Texas law restricts the application of advance directives in pregnant patients, but Muñoz's husband argued that the law was not applicable because his wife was legally dead. A judge ordered the hospital to remove organ support and her cardiac functions stopped on January 26, 2014.
- 2014 – Hall v. Florida, 572 U.S. ___ (2014), was a United States Supreme Court case in which the Court held that a bright-line IQ threshold requirement for determining whether someone has an intellectual disability (formerly mental retardation) is unconstitutional in deciding whether they are eligible for the death penalty.
- 2014 – On September 30, 2014, California Governor Jerry Brown signed Audrie's Law, "a bill that increases penalties and decreases privacy protections for teens convicted of sex acts on someone who is passed out from drugs or alcohol or incapable of giving consent due to a disability". This law was named after Audrie Pott, a 15-year-old student at Saratoga High School in Saratoga, California who died by suicide on September 12, 2012. She had been sexually assaulted at a party eight days earlier by three of her classmates, Bronson Barna, Saha Ghafouri (or Saha Nicholas) and Vince Rositano, and pictures of the assault were posted online with accompanying bullying.
- 2014 - In 2014, the National Association of the Deaf filed a complaint with the United States Department of Justice Civil Rights Division alleging that thousands of lectures and other course content that had been made freely available via YouTube and iTunes by the University of California, Berkeley violated the Americans with Disabilities Act of 1990 because numerous lectures in the university's Massive open online course program featured automatically generated captions, which contained inaccuracies. In 2016, the Department of Justice concluded that the content would violate the ADA unless it was updated to conform to the current Web Content Accessibility Guidelines. In response, a university spokesperson stated that the costs of "captioning alone would exceed a million dollars" and that the university would comply with the DOJ order by removing all of the content from public access.
- 2014 – Authors Guild v. HathiTrust, 755 F.3d 87 (2d Cir. 2014), was a copyright decision finding search and accessibility uses of digitized books to be fair use. The Authors Guild, other author organizations, and individual authors claimed that the HathiTrust Digital Library had infringed their copyrights through its use of books scanned by Google. A federal court ruled against the plaintiffs in October 2012, finding that HathiTrust's use was permissible under fair use. The plaintiffs appealed the decision to the Second Circuit, and were rebuffed in 2014. In an opinion by Barrington Daniels Parker Jr., the Second Circuit largely affirmed the lower court's findings of fair use for accessibility and search, remanding only to consider whether the plaintiffs had standing to sue about library preservation copies. The remaining claims were settled on January 6, 2015.
- 2014–2017: While working for Disability Rights Advocates in July 2014, Haben Girma represented the National Federation of the Blind and a blind Vermont resident in a lawsuit against Scribd for allegedly failing to provide access to blind readers, in violation of the Americans with Disabilities Act. Scribd moved to dismiss, arguing that the Americans with Disabilities Act only applied to physical locations. In March 2015, the U.S. District Court of Vermont ruled that the ADA covered online businesses as well. A settlement agreement was reached, with Scribd agreeing to provide content accessible to blind readers by the end of 2017.
- 2015 – It was announced by Oregon state officials that the California-based owner and operator of a housing complex in Lake Oswego, Oregon (Prometheus Real Estate Group) had agreed to pay $475,000 to settle allegations that it failed to provide a reasonable accommodation to a disabled former resident. In October 2011, James Calogridis requested a disabled parking spot closer to his and his wife's unit in the housing complex because of a disability that limited his ability to walk. But in January 2012 he fell in the parking lot of the complex and was injured, dying of his injuries on February 9; February 9 was only one day after the complex owners gave him the parking spot he had requested. In addition to the payment of $475,000, it was also agreed that Prometheus Real Estate Group must, "[c]omply with the Oregon Fair Housing Act and the Federal Fair Housing Act (FHA), [p]rovide BOLI [the Bureau of Labor and Industries] with a list of all Prometheus-owned or managed properties, [r]eport any property ownership changes or acquisitions to BOLI for three years, [c]onduct annual FHA trainings for all Prometheus employees, [m]aintain a "reasonable accommodation" log that documents tenant accommodation requests for BOLI on a semi-annual basis, [p]rovide BOLI with its policies and practices for reasonably accommodating tenant disabilities for the agency's review, [and n]otify all tenants of Prometheus properties in Oregon of their rights to reasonable accommodations."
- 2015 – U.S. District Judge Beth Bloom of the United States District Court for the Southern District of Florida ruled that Anthony Merchante's service dog should be allowed to join him at Nob Hill Elementary, and do so without a series of requirements the school district had added on.
- 2015 – The governor of Maryland signed a law establishing the Ethan Saylor Alliance for Self-Advocates as Educators; it was designed to operate out of the state's Department of Disabilities, and to bring together people with intellectual and developmental disabilities to teach law enforcement officers about their needs. The law was named for Robert Ethan Saylor, a 26-year-old man with Down syndrome who died in 2013 after being restrained by three off-duty sheriff's deputies when he refused to leave a Frederick, Md. movie theater.
- 2015 – Brumfield v. Cain, 576 U.S. ___ (2015), was a United States Supreme Court case in which the Court held that because Brumfield satisfied 28 U.S.C. § 2254(d)(2)'s requirements, he was entitled to have his Atkins v. Virginia claim considered on the merits in federal court.
- 2015 – In the U.S. Supreme Court case Texas Dept. of Housing and Community Affairs v. Inclusive Communities Project, Inc., 576 U.S. ___ (2015), the Court held that Congress specifically intended to include disparate impact claims in the Fair Housing Act, but that such claims require a plaintiff to prove it is the defendant's policies that cause a disparity. The Fair Housing Act prohibits discrimination based on disability.
- 2015 - The Every Student Succeeds Act set new mandates on expectations and requirements for students with disabilities.
- 2015 – New York City held its first Disability Pride Parade; Tom Harkin was its grand marshal.
- 2015 – Paying workers with disabilities less than the minimum wage was outlawed in New Hampshire.
- 2015 – A federal ruling allowed immigrants with serious mental disabilities deported from Arizona, California, and Washington between November 21, 2011 and January 27, 2015 to request that their immigration cases be reopened. The ruling covered immigrants deported from Arizona, California, and Washington between November 21, 2011 and January 27, 2015.
- 2015 - A law was passed in Hawaii requiring two screenings a week of each movie with captions on the screen.
- 2015 - In Pierce v. District of Columbia (2015), Ketanji Brown Jackson of the United States District Court for the District of Columbia ruled that the D.C. Department of Corrections violated the rights of a deaf inmate under the Americans with Disabilities Act because jail officials failed to provide the inmate with reasonable accommodations, or to assess his need for reasonable accommodations, during his detention in 2012. Jackson held that "the District's willful blindness regarding" Pierce's need for accommodation and its half-hearted attempt to provide Pierce with a random assortment of auxiliary aids—and only after he specifically requested them—fell far short of what the law requires."
- 2016 – A Florida law, the first of its kind in the country, allowed people with developmental disabilities to have an expert with them during a police interview to explain what is happening and to pose questions in a way the interview subject can understand. It also made it easier for authorities to know who might need assistance by creating a voluntary new designation on state identification cards.
- 2016 – Three European airlines – Air France, British Airways and Lufthansa – were penalized up to a combined $550,000 for dealing improperly with complaints from disabled travelers, as the U.S. Transportation Department announced. The cases involved the airlines not following U.S. rules for responding to numerous complaints received from 2012 to 2015.
- 2016 – An ethics rule of the American Bar Association now forbids comments or actions that single out someone on the basis of disability, as well as other factors.
- 2016 – Paying workers with disabilities less than the minimum wage was outlawed in Maryland.
- 2016 – In United States v. Morin, No. 15-50197 (5th Cir. 2016) the defendant challenged two special conditions of his supervised release. The court agreed that one of the conditions, which gave a private therapist the right to impose "lifestyle restrictions" that might be unnecessary to the treatment and could be in force throughout the defendant's supervised release, was an improper delegation. Thus the court vacated that condition. (The court also ruled on a requirement for the defendant to abstain from alcohol and other intoxicants, but that is not relevant to disability rights as forced therapeutic treatment restrictions are.)
- 2016 - Uber settled a lawsuit that had been filed by the National Federation of the Blind to make certain that passengers with guide dogs received equal access to transportation.
- 2017 – Endrew F. v. Douglas County School Dist. RE–1, 580 U.S. ___ (2017), was a case in which the United States Supreme Court held that, under the Individuals with Disabilities Education Act ("IDEA"), schools must provide students an education that is "reasonably calculated to enable a child to make progress appropriate in light of the child's circumstances."
- 2017 – Moore v. Texas, 581 U. S. ____ (2017), was a United States Supreme Court decision clarifying that, in order to comply with Atkins v. Virginia, 536 U.S. 304 (2002), courts must use legitimate medical diagnostic criteria when diagnosing mental disabilities in those on death row. The Court relied on Atkins, which held that the execution of any individual with a mental disability is unconstitutional, in holding that "mild levels of intellectual disability [...] nevertheless remain intellectual disabilities [...] and States may not execute anyone in the entire category of intellectually disabled offenders".
- 2017 – Fry v. Napoleon Community Schools, 580 U.S. ___ (2017), is a United States Supreme Court case in which the Court held that the Handicapped Children's Protection Act of 1986 does not command exhaustion of state-level administrative remedies codified in the Individuals with Disabilities Education Act (IDEA) when the gravamen of the plaintiff's lawsuit is not related to the denial of free appropriate public education (FAPE).
- 2017 – Mitrice Richardson was a 24-year-old American woman who went missing on September 17, 2009 after being released from a Calabasas, California jail where she had been taken after behaving erratically at a restaurant. She was subsequently found deceased 11 months later in August 2010. Richardson's parents maintained that their daughter should never have been released on her own by the Los Angeles County Sheriff's Department given her obviously disturbed condition. In 2011 they won civil lawsuits against the county of $900,000 in damages. In January 2017, the California Attorney General's office concluded an investigation into the circumstances surrounding Richardson's release from jail and decided not to bring charges against anyone involved in her release.
- 2018 – Delta Air Lines stated that starting March 1, documentation would be required about the health of service and support animals, and in some cases there would have to be a promise of their good conduct.
- 2018 – United Airlines refused to allow a person to bring her emotional support peacock on a flight leaving from Newark Liberty International Airport.
- 2018 – Paying workers with disabilities less than the minimum wage was outlawed in Alaska in 2018.
- 2018 – Starting March 1, United Airlines required documents to confirm that an emotional support animal is healthy and properly trained for being in public places.
- 2018 – A woman was removed from a Frontier Airlines flight due to her bringing a squirrel and refusing to leave with it; the airline would not allow the squirrel to be considered an emotional support animal.
- 2018 – Beginning November 1, 2018, Frontier Airlines declared that emotional support animals must be either a dog or a cat, may be only one animal per customer, must have the airline notified of them at least 48 hours before departure, and must be in a carrier that can be stowed under the seat in front of the customer or on a leash while in the airport and aboard the aircraft.
- 2018 - In December 2018, the U.S. Department of Transportation began requiring that airlines track the number of reports they receive of mishandled wheelchairs and scooters.
- 2019 – A law was enacted requiring New Jersey boards of education to adopt instruction accurately showing "the political, economic, and social contributions of persons with disabilities and lesbian, gay, bisexual, and transgender people, where appropriate."
- 2019 – In the case Madison v. Alabama, the Supreme Court held that the Eighth Amendment may permit executing a prisoner even if they cannot remember committing their crime but it may prohibit executing a prisoner who has dementia or another disorder rather than psychotic delusions.
- 2019 – Box v. Planned Parenthood of Indiana and Kentucky, Inc. (Docket 18–483) was a United States Supreme Court case dealing with the constitutionality of a 2016 anti-abortion law passed in the state of Indiana. Indiana's law sought to ban abortions performed solely on the basis of the fetus' gender, race, ethnicity, or disabilities. Lower courts had blocked enforcement of the law for violating a woman's right to abortion under privacy concerns within the Fourteenth Amendment, as previously found in the landmark cases Roe v. Wade and Planned Parenthood v. Casey. The lower courts also blocked enforcement of another portion of the law that required the disposal of aborted fetuses through burial or cremation. The per curiam decision by the Supreme Court overturned the injunction on the fetal disposal portion of the law, but otherwise did not challenge or confirm the lower courts' ruling on the non-discrimination clauses, leaving these in place.

== 2020s ==
- 2020 – Kahler v. Kansas, No. 18-6135, is a case of the United States Supreme Court in which the justices ruled that the Fifth and Fourteenth Amendments of the United States Constitution did not require that states adopt the insanity defense in criminal cases that is based on the defendant's ability to recognize right from wrong. It was argued on October 7, 2019 and decided on March 23, 2020.
- 2020 – A law was enacted in Mississippi banning abortions based on the genetic abnormality, sex, or race of the fetus.
- 2020 – Our Lady of Guadalupe School v. Morrissey-Berru, 591 U.S. ___ (2020), is a United States Supreme Court case involving the ministerial exception of federal employment discrimination laws. The case extends from the Supreme Court's prior decision in Hosanna-Tabor Evangelical Lutheran Church & School v. Equal Employment Opportunity Commission (2012) which created the ministerial exception based on the Establishment and Free Exercise Clauses of the United States Constitution, asserting that federal discrimination laws cannot be applied to leaders of religious organizations. The Supreme Court case Our Lady of Guadalupe School v. Morrissey-Berru, along with the consolidated St. James School v. Biel (Docket 19–348), both arose from rulings in the United States Court of Appeals for the Ninth Circuit that found that federal discrimination laws do apply to others within a religious organization that serve an important religious function but lack the title or training to be considered a religious leader under Hosanna-Tabor. In St. James School v. Biel, in 2018, the United States Court of Appeals for the Ninth Circuit declined to use the ministerial exception to bar the disability-discrimination suit of an elementary school teacher who "taught religion for about thirty minutes a day, four days a week, using a workbook on the Catholic faith." The religious organization challenged that ruling on the basis of Hosanna-Tabor. The Supreme Court ruled in a 7–2 decision called Our Lady of Guadalupe School v. Morrissey-Berru on July 8, 2020 that reversed the Ninth Circuit's ruling, affirming that the principles of Hosanna-Tabor, that a person can be serving an important religious function even if not holding the title or training of a religious leader, satisfied the ministerial exception in employment discrimination.
- 2020 - The Texas State Board of Social Work Examiners changed a section of its code of conduct, thus making it so that the code no longer prohibited social workers from turning away clients on the basis of disability, sexual orientation, or gender identity. However, this change was reversed two weeks after it was enacted.
- 2020 - Tennessee banned abortions because of a prenatal diagnosis of Down syndrome, or because of the gender or race of the fetus.
- 2020 - Due to a rule change by the US Department of Transportation, only dogs qualify as service animals for plane rides.
- 2020 – 2022: The Judge Rotenberg Center is known for its use of the graduated electronic decelerator (GED), a device that administers electric shocks to residents through a remote control. The device was designed by Matthew Israel, the institute's founder. While the FDA issued a formal ban on the GED in 2020, the device continued to be used on some residents pending an administrative stay for the duration of the COVID-19 pandemic. In July 2021, the D.C. Circuit Court of Appeals ruled that the FDA could not issue a "partial stay" but must issue a blanket ban or no ban at all, thus allowing the JRC to continue subjecting 55 people to shock in the meantime. In response to this ruling, congress amended the Food, Drug, and Cosmetic Act through the Consolidated Appropriations Act of 2022. The new amendments allow the FDA to ban a medical device for a particular use irrespective of approval for other uses. This legislation effectively overturned the ruling reached by the D.C. Circuit Court of Appeals.
- 2021 - In April 2021, an arbitrator ruled against Uber in a case involving California resident Lisa Irving, a blind customer with a guide dog who was denied rides on 14 separate occasions. Uber was ordered to pay $1.1 million dollars, reflecting $324,000 in damages and more than $800,000 in attorney fees and court costs. Uber had argued their drivers were independent contractors and thus Uber was not responsible for their drivers violating the Americans with Disabilities Act, but the arbitrator's award said, "Whether its drivers are employees or independent contractors, Uber is nonetheless subject to the ADA as a result of its contractual relationship with its drivers".
- 2021 - The Department of Education announced that it was cancelling student debt for over 40,000 Americans who were granted loan forgiveness because of disabilities but later had their debt reinstated after they did not submit certain paperwork.
- 2022 - Gallardo v. Marstiller, 596 U.S. ___ (2022), was a United States Supreme Court case that held the Medicaid Act permits a state to seek reimbursement from settlement payments allocated for future medical care. The case was brought by the parents of Gianinna Gallardo, who was in a persistent vegetative state.
- 2022 - A law took effect in New York City requiring movie theaters to offer captions on the screen for up to four showtimes per movie each week, including weekends and Friday nights.
- 2022 - It was announced that the United States Department of Transportation had published the Airline Passengers with Disabilities Bill of Rights. It (as stated by the United States Department of Transportation) "describes the fundamental rights of air travelers with disabilities under the Air Carrier Access Act and its implementing regulation, 14 Code of Federal Regulations (CFR) Part 382."
- 2022 - In 2022, the United States Court of Appeals for the Fourth Circuit stated that the Americans with Disabilities Act covers individuals with gender dysphoria, which may aid transgender people in accessing legal protections they otherwise may be unable to.
- 2022 - A law was enacted requiring judges in California to document all alternatives to a conservatorship before granting one, giving potential conservatees in California preference in selecting a conservator, and making it easier to end probate conservatorships in California.
- 2022 - Nevada voters voted yes to the ballot question, "Shall the Nevada Constitution be amended by adding a specific guarantee that equality of rights under the law shall not be denied or abridged by this State or any of its cities, counties, or other political subdivisions on account of race, color, creed, sex, sexual orientation, gender identity or expression, age, disability, ancestry, or national origin".
- 2023 - On January 1 a law went into effect in Rhode Island mandating equal pay for "comparable work" (with comparable work defined as work requiring substantially similar skill, effort and responsibility and performed under "similar working conditions") regardless of disability, gender, race, sexual orientation, religion, nationality, or age.
- 2023 - In Health and Hospital Corporation of Marion County v. Talevski, 599 U.S. 166 (2023), the United States Supreme Court held that the provisions of the Federal Nursing Home Reform Act (FNHRA) at issue unambiguously created rights enforceable under Section 1983 of the Ku Klux Klan Act (codified at 42 U.S.C. § 1983), and private enforcement under §1983 is compatible with the FNHRA’s remedial scheme. The Supreme Court ruled that a plaintiff can file a federal civil rights claim because of violation of the Federal Nursing Home Reform Act. The Supreme Court case was regarding a man with dementia.

== See also ==
- Disability in the United States
