= Quill Award =

Former American literary award

The Quill Award was an American literary award that ran for three years, from 2005 to 2007. It was a "consumer-driven award created to inspire reading while promoting literacy".

The Quills Foundation, the organization behind the award, was supported by a number of notable media corporations, including Reed Business Information, then parent of Publishers Weekly, and NBC Universal Television Stations, along with Parade Magazine, Borders, Barnes & Noble, and the American Booksellers Association.

== History ==
In February 2008, Reed Business Information announced plans to dissolve the awards program and distribute the remaining Foundation funds to non-profit organizations First Book and Literacy Partners. Reed declined to give reasons for the suspension, but the awards had produced little effect on book sales, and the televised ceremonies were criticized for being too long and poorly planned.

== Selection process ==
Winners were selected through a two-part process involving nomination by industry experts and final selection by consumer votes. To be eligible for nomination, a book had to be published in English during the previous year and be included in at least one industry or sponsor listing.

Readers selected the winners from among the five nominees selected by the board for each category. For the 2007 edition, however, the choice by public vote was restricted to book of the year, and winners in other categories were chosen by retailers and librarians.

== 2007 Quill Award winners ==
- Book of the year: Angels Fall, Nora Roberts
- Debut author of the year: Diane Setterfield, The Thirteenth Tale
- Audio book: To Kill a Mockingbird, Harper Lee (read by Sissy Spacek)
- Children's illustrated book: Flotsam, David Wiesner
- Children's chapter book/middle grade: The Invention of Hugo Cabret, Brian Selznick
- Young adult/teen: Sold, Patricia McCormick
- General fiction: The Road, Cormac McCarthy
- Graphic novel: Making Comics, Scott McCloud
- Mystery/suspense/thriller: What the Dead Know, Laura Lippman
- Poetry: For the Confederate Dead, Kevin Young
- Romance: Angels Fall, Nora Roberts
- Science fiction/fantasy/horror: The Name of the Wind, Patrick Rothfuss
- Religion/spirituality: Religious Literacy: What Every American Needs to Know - And Doesn't, Stephen Prothero
- Biography/memoir: Einstein: His Life and Universe, Walter Isaacson
- Business: The No Asshole Rule, Robert I. Sutton
- Cooking: Joy of Cooking: 75th Anniversary Edition, Irma S. Rombauer, Marion Rombauer Becker, and Ethan Becker
- Health/self-improvement: How Doctors Think, Jerome Groopman, M.D.
- History/current events/politics: The Assault on Reason, Al Gore
- Humor: I Like You: Hospitality Under the Influence, Amy Sedaris
- Sports: The Kings of New York, Michael Weinreb

== 2006 Quill Award winners ==
- Book of the Year: Don't Make a Black Woman Take off Her Earrings: Madea's Uninhibited Commentaries on Love and Life, Tyler Perry
- Debut Author of the Year: Julie Powell for work in Julie & Julia: 365 Days, 524 Recipes, 1 Tiny Apartment Kitchen
- Audio Book: Marley & Me, John Grogan
- Children's Illustrated Book: If You Give a Pig a Party, Laura Joffe Numeroff
- Children's Chapter Book/Middle Grade: The Penultimate Peril, Lemony Snicket
- Young Adult/Teen: Eldest, Christopher Paolini
- General Fiction: A Dirty Job, Christopher Moore
- Graphic Novel: Naruto, Volume 7, Masashi Kishimoto
- Mystery/Suspense/Thriller: Twelve Sharp, Janet Evanovich
- Poetry: Amazing Peace: A Christmas Poem, Maya Angelou
- Romance: Blue Smoke, Nora Roberts
- Science Fiction/Fantasy/Horror: A Breath of Snow and Ashes, Diana Gabaldon
- Religion/Spirituality: Mama Made the Difference, T. D. Jakes
- Biography/Memoir: Marley & Me, John Grogan
- Business: The Girl's Guide to Being a Boss (Without Being a Bitch): Valuable Lessons, Smart Suggestions, and True Stories for Succeeding as the Chick-in-Charge, Caitlin Friedman and Kimberly Yorio
- Cooking: Rachael Ray 365: No Repeats: A Year of Deliciously Different Dinners, Rachael Ray
- Health/Self Improvement: It's Not Easy Being Green: And Other Things to Consider, Jim Henson
- History/Current Events/Politics: An Inconvenient Truth, Al Gore
- Humor: Don't Make a Black Woman Take off Her Earrings: Madea's Uninhibited Commentaries on Love and Life, Tyler Perry
- Sports: Get Your Own Damn Beer, I'm Watching the Game!: A Woman's Guide to Loving Pro Football, Holly Robinson Peete
- Variety Blockbuster Book to Film: The Devil Wears Prada and its film adaptation, author Lauren Weisberger and director David Frankel

== 2005 Quill Award winners ==
- Book of the Year: Harry Potter and the Half-Blood Prince, J. K. Rowling, Mary GrandPré (Illustrator)
- Debut Author of the Year: Elizabeth Kostova for The Historian
- Audio Book: America, Jon Stewart and the writers of The Daily Show
- Children's Illustrated Book: Runny Babbit, Shel Silverstein
- Children's Chapter Book/Middle Grade: Harry Potter and the Half-Blood Prince, J.K. Rowling, Mary GrandPré (Illustrator)
- Young Adult/Teen: Girls in Pants: The Third Summer of the Sisterhood, Ann Brashares
- General Fiction: The Mermaid Chair, Sue Monk Kidd
- Graphic Novel: Marvel 1602 Volume I, Neil Gaiman, Andy Kubert and Richard Isanove
- Mystery/Suspense/Thriller: Eleven on Top, Janet Evanovich
- Poetry: Let America Be America Again: And Other Poems, Langston Hughes
- Romance: 44 Cranberry Point, Debbie Macomber
- Science Fiction/Fantasy/Horror: The Stupidest Angel, Christopher Moore
- Religion and Spirituality: Peace is the Way: Bringing War and Violence to an End, Deepak Chopra
- Biography/Memoir: Chronicles, Vol. 1, Bob Dylan
- Business: Freakonomics, Steven Levitt and Stephen J. Dubner
- Cooking: Rachael Ray's 30-Minute Get Real Meals: Eat Healthy Without Going to Extremes, Rachael Ray
- Health and Self-Improvement: He's Just Not That Into You: The No-Excuses Truth to Understanding Guys, Greg Behrendt and Liz Tuccillo
- History/Current Events/Politics: 1776, David McCullough
- Humor: America, Jon Stewart and the writers of The Daily Show
- Sports: Faithful: Two Diehard Boston Red Sox Fans Chronicle the Historic 2004 Season, Stewart O'Nan and Stephen King

The foundation awarded a Quills Corporate Literacy Award to Verizon for its support of literacy programs in the United States.
