= Starkloff =

Starkloff or von Starkloff is a surname. Notable people with the surname include:

- Irma S. Rombauer (née Irma von Starkloff, 1877–1962), American cookbook author
- Max Starkloff (born Maximilian Carl von Starkloff, 1937–2010), American disability rights activist
- Max C. Starkloff (born Maximilian Carl von Starkloff, 1858–1942), American physician
