= Deidre Davis Butler =

American disability rights activist (1955–2020)

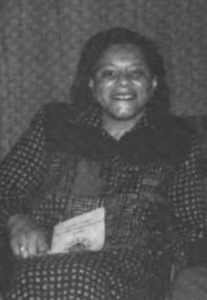
- Deidre Ann Davis, from a 1997 publication of the United States Department of State.
- Born: Deidre Ann Davis; September 26, 1955; Elizabeth, New Jersey
- Died: August 7, 2020 (aged 64); Rogers, Arkansas
- Occupations: Lawyer, disability rights activist, federal official

Deidre Davis Butler (September 26, 1955 – August 7, 2020), born Deidre Ann Davis, was an American disability rights activist and federal official.

== Early life ==
Davis was born in Elizabeth, New Jersey, and raised in nearby Linden, the daughter of Hilton Davis and Bernice Jones Davis. Her mother was a teacher and her father was a lawyer. In childhood, a spinal tumor and the surgeries to treat it affected her ability to walk; she used leg braces and canes as a girl, and a wheelchair later in life. She attended Brandeis University as an undergraduate, and Howard University School of Law, completing her Juris Doctor degree in 1980. She was a member of Alpha Kappa Alpha sorority.

== Career ==
Davis worked in state and national disability programs as a young lawyer, beginning at Rehabilitation International in New York in 1980. In 1987, she worked at the United States Department of Education. She was involved in drafting the Air Carrier Access Act and the Americans with Disabilities Act of 1990 (ADA), among other important legislation for accessibility and disability rights. "I was one of the very few people of color in the inner layers of helping to draft the ADA, implement it, enforce it from all different perspectives," she told NPR's Michel Martin in 2010.

Davis served in the White House Office of Presidential Personnel from 1995 to 2001, and was head of the ADA Technical Assistance Division at the Equal Employment Opportunity Commission. She traveled extensively, overseeing civil rights compliance at American embassies overseas. In 2005, she became director of ADA services for Walmart. She retired from Walmart in 2012.

Butler was founder of DYSability Dynamics, LLC, a disability law consulting firm. She served on the boards of the National Council on Independent Living (NCIL), the Howard University Center on Minorities with Disabilities, and the National Black Disability Coalition. She was awarded NCIL's Max Starkloff Lifetime Achievement Award in 2020, just before she died. The day before she died, she was listed as a featured panelist in an online event sponsored by the State of New Jersey, celebrating the 30th anniversary of the ADA.

== Personal life ==
Deidre Davis married Juan K. Butler in 2015. She died August 7, 2020, in Rogers, Arkansas. Her grave is in the Fayetteville National Cemetery.
