= The Last Home Run =

1996 film

The Last Home Run is a 1996 American drama film directed by Bob Gosse. It stars Seymour Cassel, Thomas Guiry, Jordi Vilasuso, and Vinnette Justine Carroll (in her last film appearance), and includes cameos by former Major League Baseball players Gary Carter and Dave Winfield. It is based on a story by Roger Flax who wrote the screenplay with Ed Apfel.

== Plot ==
Jonathan Lyle, an elderly man in a nursing home (played by Seymour Cassel) is transformed by a mystic into a 12-year-old boy (played by Thomas Guiry) , for five days so he can play Little League Baseball.

== Production ==
The movie marked the only film appearance by the real Marley, the Labrador Retriever that was the central character of the best-selling 2005 book Marley & Me and the 2008 film of the same name. Author John Grogan devoted Chapter 16, "The Audition", to the dog's escapades during filming at a Lake Worth, Florida, hotel parking lot. Marley got a screen credit "Marley the Dog...As Himself" for his two minutes of screen time.

== Release ==
The independent film was produced in 1995, and was released direct-to-video on March 23, 1996.
