= Edward R. Murrow High School =

Public school in New York City

Location
- 1600 Avenue L Brooklyn, New York 11230; United States; 40°37′15″N 73°57′33″W

Information
- Type: Public high school; Ed. Opt., Audition
- Motto: "…because at Edward R. Murrow High School, we CARE about our students!"
- Established: 1974; 52 years ago
- Founder: Saul Bruckner
- School district: 21
- School number: K525
- Principal: Allen Barge
- Teaching staff: 232.20 (FTE)
- Grades: 9–12
- Enrollment: 3,595 (2023–24)
- Student to teacher ratio: 15.67
- Colors: Green; White
- Nickname: Murrow
- Newspaper: The Murrow Network
- Website: ermurrowhs.org

Edward R. Murrow High School is a public high school in Midwood, Brooklyn, New York City, operated by the New York City Department of Education. The school is dedicated to the arts, and students can audition for programs in music, fine and visual arts, or theater. The school was established in 1974 by Saul Bruckner, who also served as its first principal, and was named after the renowned broadcast journalist Edward R. Murrow. The school was founded based on the pedagogical theories of John Dewey and the learning and teaching methods of John Dewey High School.

After Bruckner's retirement in 2004, Anthony Lodico became Murrow's second principal. In March 2012, Lodico announced his resignation, and Allen Barge took over as principal the following month.

== Academics ==
Murrow's academic year is divided into two semesters. Students receive new class schedules and teachers at the end of January. The daily schedule shifts depending on the day of the week, with class lengths varying from 45 minutes to an hour, and each class meets only four times a week. Rather than having a lunch period or study halls, Murrow students have free periods called "OPTAs" (Optional Time Activities), used for studying, eating, or relaxing.

In response to concerns over overcrowding and student behavior during free periods, the school administration made the decision to eliminate Optional Time Activities (OPTAs) and have a uniform schedule during the 2022-2023 academic year. To mitigate this change, students are now required to have a pass in order to visit the library, and are restricted to eating lunch only in their designated cafeteria. The 285 suite, which was previously available to students with an OPTA, has been repurposed as an additional cafeteria to accommodate the students.

During the 2022-2023 school year, the school implemented significant changes to its schedule. In contrast to the previous model, where students met with each class four times a week, the updated schedule now requires students to attend each class five times per week. Additionally, the schedule has shifted to a more standardized system, with each period is now at a set, specific time rather than varying times throughout the week. On Friday, the schedule is shorter.

Murrow has a number of features including:

- NYC High School adjusted its grade policies in 2013 so that a "U" is used instead of an "N". The letter grading system, with each letter corresponding to a numerical measurement, e.g. E = 90-100, G = 80–89, S = 79–65, U = 65 - 55, NS = below 55 (No Show = student who never reported to class), and MI for Mastery in Independent Study.
- In calculating the average, E is treated as a 95, G = 85, S = 75, and U = 55. This means that for getting the highest grade in all classes, a student will not achieve an average higher than 95. In college admissions applications, an explanatory letter is forwarded to colleges to explain this fact.
  - In the spring semester of the 2022-2023 academic year, the school implemented a major change to its grading policy. Under the direction of the School Leadership Team, the traditional letter grading system was replaced by a numerical grading system. The new system assigns grades in increments of one, ranging from 65 to 100, with a grade of 55 representing a failing mark.
- Instead of using numbers to represent class periods, Murrow uses letters from A-J, excluding I. The periods are called "bands" (e.g., A-Band, D-Band). Some students take classes that meet before A-Band and after J-Band. These bands are "0 (zero)-Band" and "K-Band" and usually things like crew, cast, or costuming.
- There are no daily "home room" meetings. Entering students are assigned to a "Student Communication Section", or SCS, and remain in that SCS until graduation. The SCS meets only on an "as needed" basis and is used solely for dissemination of school-wide administrative/logistical information (e.g., distribution of report cards or new class schedules; election of class officers); 2 morning bands are cut short to allow time for SCS to convene. For mandated citywide testing, students usually attend a half-day of classes, followed by the test in the SCS.
  - Following the return to full in-person schooling after the COVID-19 pandemic, the school decided to eliminate SCS meetings. Instead, important documents and information are now distributed during B-Band.
- While many state-mandated courses (e.g., science- and math-based courses) are geared toward students of a particular class year, other elective courses (e.g., performing arts, physical education electives) are not; students taking these electives will usually find themselves in classes with students from other class years.

Edward R. Murrow High School is also known for its outstanding theater program. Their success in the arts was recognized by Mel Brooks, who granted the school to be the first-ever to gain rights to the smash hit musical "The Producers" in Spring 2008.

In attempt to diversify schools, some high schools in NYC, including Murrow, use the DOE's "Educational Option" model. Instead of tracking, schools admit learners of all capabilities by purposefully accepting a set percentage of students with high, middle and low test scores.

== Student demographics ==
The 2023–2024 academic year saw a student enrollment of approximately 3,595 students at the school. The ethnic makeup of the student body was diverse, with 30% identifying as White, 26% as Asian, 20% as Hispanic or Latinx, 18% as African American, and less than 1% as Native Hawaiian/Pacific Islander. Out of the reported 3,595 students, 9% were identified as English language learners. Additionally, 18% of students had Individualized Education Programs (IEPs).The student-teacher ratio was reported as 15:1.

== Audition programs ==
=== Theater ===
The Edward R. Murrow High School Studio Theater Program offers courses in various aspects of theater, including Acting, Directing, Set Design, and more. Additionally, the program offers partnerships with renowned theater organizations such as the Manhattan Theater Club and Roundabout Theater, providing students with opportunities to connect with industry professionals and explore the world of theater.

Students can participate in a variety of opportunities, including musicals and plays, theater workshops, and competitions such as Sing#! and the August Wilson Monologue Competition and the Shakespeare Competition. Additionally, the program offers an improv troupe and internships with technical theater shops to give students hands-on experience in the field.

Mel Brooks granted the school the rights to perform the musical The Producers in the spring of 2008, making it the first-ever school to do so.

=== Music ===
The school's music department offers a variety of performance courses for students, including opportunities to learn to play guitar, piano, percussion, a band or orchestral instrument, or sing in a chorus. Students can participate in these courses without any prerequisite or audition, but placement auditions are required to join one of the school's performance ensembles.

For students interested in pursuing music beyond the minimum graduation requirement, a sequence of study is available in the guitar, piano, orchestral, choral, or band program. Specialized classes in vocal or instrumental technique and music theory are also available with permission from a music teacher.

The Music Institute is an auditioned program for students committed to developing their musical skills, who will fulfill the requirements for a Chancellor’s Endorsed Arts diploma.

The school also offers non-performance classes, such as Music History.

In addition, Murrow's Music Technology CTE Program provides courses in music technology, including Recording Techniques & MIDI and Studio Practicum. During the 2015-2016 school year, the school launched the Music x Technology program with the help of Alicia Keys and Levi's Jeans. The program provides students with access to a recording studio and production equipment, allowing them to study sound engineering, audio-visual production, post-production, mastering, songwriting, and more. The department also hosts an annual Music x Tech Fest where students and alumni showcase their original songs and music videos to raise money for charity.

=== Fine and visual arts ===
The Art Institute at Edward R. Murrow High School aims to develop students' knowledge and skills in the arts through participation in a creative community. The program offers students opportunities to explore and develop as individual artists, through a range of courses including Art Studio, Fashion Illustration and Design, Intro to Painting 1 & 2, Animation, and Ceramics. Screened Art classes are available to approved students and cover topics such as Drawing from the Figure, Sculpture, Painting Studio, Advanced Studio Art, AP 2D Art Studio (Portfolio), Ceramics, and Art History. The Art Institute provides students with exposure to working artists, museum internships, and apprenticeships in New York City.

== Other programs ==
=== Advanced Placement ===
Edward R. Murrow High School offers a range of Advanced Placement (AP) courses that cover all subject areas. These classes are certified by the College Board and help prepare students for college. Additionally, students who receive a sufficient grade may receive credit by the college or university they attend.

The Murrow Advanced Placement offerings are:

- Art and Design
- Biology
- Calculus AB
- Calculus BC
- Chemistry
- Chinese
- Computer Science
- Economics
- Environmental Science
- French
- Italian
- Junior AP-Language and Composition
- Music Theory
- Physics
- Precalculus
- Psychology
- Senior AP-Literature and Composition
- Spanish Language
- Spanish Literature
- Statistics
- United States Government and Politics
- United States History
- World History
- Capstone (2 years)

=== Technical Theater & Costuming ===
The Technical Theater Program at Edward R. Murrow High School offers a curriculum, facility, and faculty for students interested in technical aspects of theater. Concentrations in Lighting Design/Stage Lighting, Technical Direction/Production & Stage Management, Costume Design/Costuming, and Scene Painting are available. Students in the program have opportunities to learn about set design, set painting, stage lighting and sound, and costuming. The program provides students with a safe and creative environment to develop their technical skills and pursue their passion for theater.

=== Dance ===
Edward R. Murrow high school offers a range of dance classes that cater to students with varying levels of experience. The courses include Introduction to Dance, Modern Dance, Latin Dance, Physical Movement, Theatre Movement 1 and 2, Advanced Dance Class, and Dance Ensemble/Choreography. Students can also take Dance History and Literacy as an education broadening module. Dance Ensemble includes Introduction to Dance and other advanced dance classes, where students can develop their skills and technique.

=== Business Education ===
The Career and Technical Education Department at Edward R. Murrow High School offers a range of courses that develop students' 21st-century skills to prepare them for college and careers.

Some of the courses offered in the department include Computer Applications, Multimedia Design 1 & 2, Digital Marketing 1 & 2, Fundamentals of Web Design I & II, Accounting, College Accounting, Career & Financial Management, Stocks and Investments, International Business, Business Law, Entrepreneurship, and Virtual Enterprise.

The Entrepreneurship program, which requires a three-year sequence of courses including Computer Applications, Entrepreneurship, and Virtual Enterprise, is a New York State approved CTE program that offers students the opportunity for work-based learning experiences such as guest speakers, career research, mock interviewing, job shadowing, mentoring, and internships. Completion of the program offers students the chance to earn Economics credit, Career & Financial Management credit, as well as a Technical Endorsement on their diploma. Students who score 75% or higher on their technical assessment may also earn college credit. Additionally, internship and scholarship opportunities may be available to students who successfully complete the program.

=== Astronomy ===
The Edwin P. Hubble Planetarium, located within Edward R. Murrow High School, was established by astronomy teacher Sam Storch in 1979. Named after the American astronomer Edwin P. Hubble, the planetarium offers students enrolled in Astronomy and Earth Science classes an opportunity to study the cosmos. The Astronomy course is a science elective that runs for a full year and is available to students who have fulfilled their Living Environment and Physical Science requirements, with priority for seating given to seniors.

Recently, the planetarium underwent a complete overhaul, including new carpeting, seating, ceilings, and dome lighting. A new sound system was also installed, and a fully digital system with Uniview© software was developed by SCISS corporation.

=== Bilingual programs ===
The school has Spanish and Chinese transitional bilingual program open to English language learners. Classes in two major content areas are taught in English and the other language.

=== Sports ===
Edward R. Murrow High School offers a range of athletic programs across various seasons, as part of the Public School Athletic League (PSAL). The school shares an athletic field with Midwood High School.

The fall season includes girls' volleyball, girls' cross country, girls' varsity soccer, boys' soccer, boys' badminton, and co-ed bowling. In the winter, students can participate in girls' and boys' table tennis, girls' and boys' varsity basketball, and boys' wrestling. The spring sports lineup features girls' badminton, girls' wrestling, co-ed golf, girls' junior varsity soccer, girls' varsity softball, and boys' volleyball.

Students at Murrow have the opportunity to participate in sports not offered at their school by joining teams at neighboring schools via the PSAL All-Access Program. This includes boys' fencing at Brooklyn Tech, boys' football, boys' baseball and boys' soccer at William E. Grady, and girls' tennis and girls' swimming at Abraham Lincoln.

In the 2023-2024 school year, Murrow expanded its athletic offerings, adding boys' basketball, girls' basketball, and girls' softball.

=== Chess ===
The Edward R. Murrow chess team has won seven national championships, fifteen state titles and sixteen city championships. The Edward R. Murrow HS chess team's success has been chronicled in the book The Kings of New York, by sportswriter Michael Weinreb. The Kings of New York follows the 2005 championship-winning season of the Murrow Team. It was reviewed positively in the March 4, 2007 NY Times Book Review. The team was personally congratulated by President Bush in the Oval Office on December 15, 2004. A movie, based on "The Kings of New York" will begin production sometime in 2014.

Agriculture

A up & coming program through the school’s science department is their program focused on urban agriculture. This includes an aquaponics system, rooftop greenhouse and more. The Murrow chapter of the National FFA Organization is one of the most active in the New York City area

== Notable alumni ==
- Darren Aronofsky - director
- Joey Badass - rapper, actor
- Jean-Michel Basquiat - artist
- Salvijus Bercys - International Chess Master
- Vitaly Borker – Internet criminal, cyberbully
- Capital STEEZ - rapper
- Nyck Caution - rapper, actor
- CJ Fly - rapper
- Yvette Clarke - U.S. Congresswoman
- Jerry Colonna - venture capitalist
- Dyme-A-Duzin - rapper
- Jade Eshete - actress
- Arabella Field - actress
- Anna Hahn - U.S. Women's Chess Champion
- Eliza Hittman - director
- Jason Katims - screenwriter, producer
- Irina Krush - U.S. Women's Chess Champion
- Alex Lenderman - International Chess Grandmaster and 2005 World under 16 Champion
- Lil Mama - rapper
- Zoe Lister-Jones - actress
- Christine Marzano - actress
- Javier Muñoz - actor
- Adepero Oduye - actress
- Edward Quist - director, artist
- Diana Richardson (born 1983) - former politician
- Kris Sanchez - founder of UberFacts
- Jennifer San Marco - Goleta postal facility shooting
- Dave Sardy - producer
- Jeffrey Alan Schechter - screenwriter, producer
- Marcia Schofield - keyboard player
- Michael Spiller - TV director, producer
- Peter Steele - singer-songwriter
- Marisa Tomei - actress
- Tascha Van Auken - political organizer
- Richard Velazquez - PepsiCo executive; first automotive designer at Porsche AG (Germany)
- Adam Yauch of the Beastie Boys - rapper
- Xochitl Gonzalez - writer

== Transportation ==
The school can be reached by public transportation, including the New York City Subway's Avenue M station (Q train) as well as MTA Regional Bus Operations' B6, B9, B11, B49, B68, BM1, BM3 and BM4 routes.
