= Richard Dodge =

Richard Dodge may refer to:

- Richard Irving Dodge, United States Army officer
- Richard Staples Dodge, American illustrator
