= The Man Who Melted Jack Dann =

Word game

The Man Who Melted Jack Dann is a word game inspired by Jack Dann's book The Man Who Melted (1984). The aim of the game is to combine the title of a book and the name of its author to make a complete phrase or sentence. Extra credit is given for shifting a word's part of speech entirely, or appropriating part of the name as a verb.

Examples include:

- The Joy of Cooking Irma S. Rombauer
- Captain Blood Returns Raphael Sabatini
- Flush Virginia Woolf
- Paradise Lost John Milton
- Clans of the Alphane Moon Philip K. Dick
- Contact Carl Sagan
- Tim O'Brien Going after Cacciato
- Two Sisters Gore Vidal
- Dan Brown Lost Symbol
- The Martian Chronicles Ray Bradbury

The game is said to have been invented by science fiction author Gardner Dozois.
