= Max C. Starkloff =

St. Louis Health Commissioner during the 1918-1920 flu pandemic

Max C. Starkloff M.D.
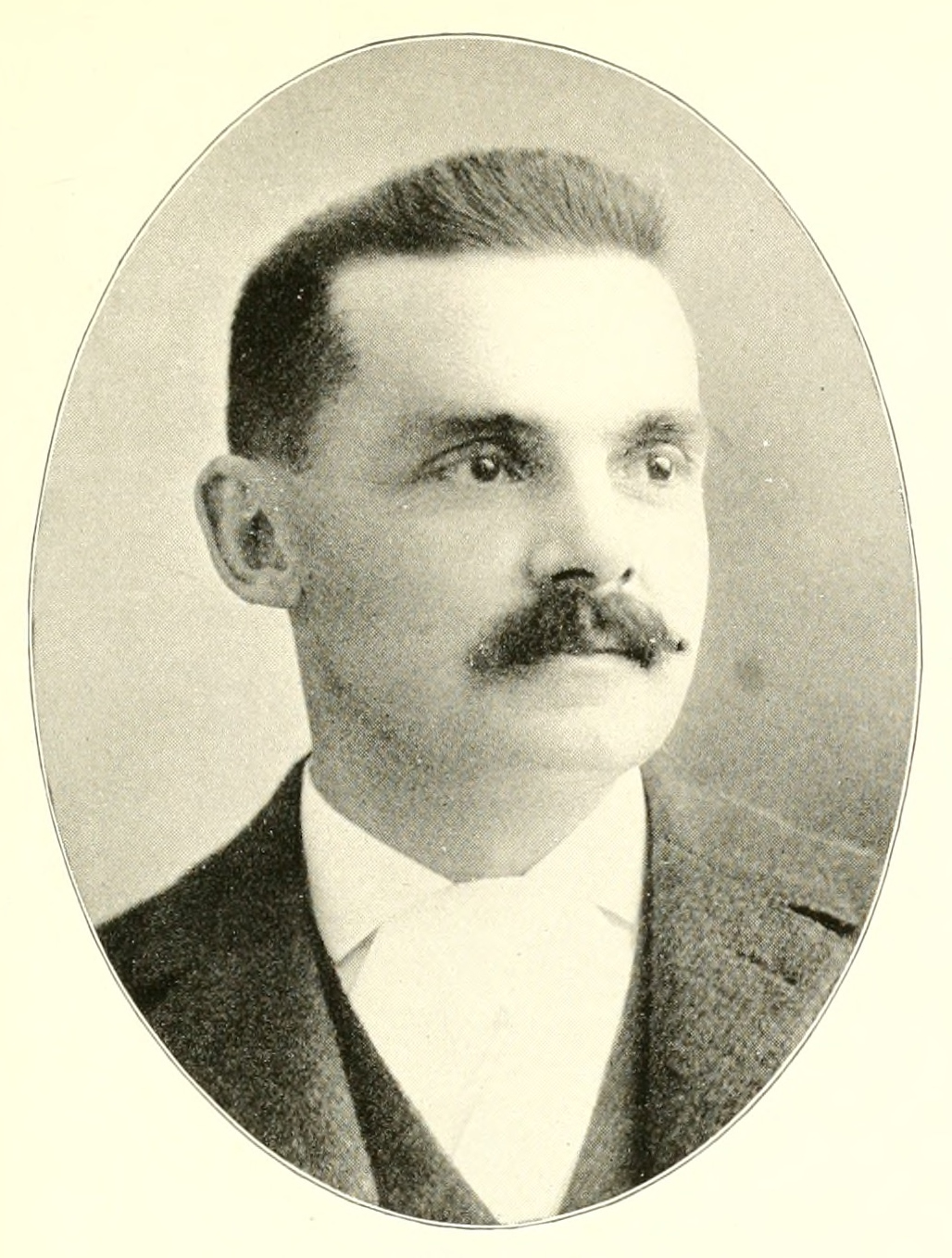
- Dr. Max C. Starkloff, c. 1900

Health Commissioner of St. Louis
- In office 1911–1933
- In office 1895–1903
- Preceded by: George Homan
- Succeeded by: John H. Simon

Personal details
- Born: Maximilian Carl von Starkloff; December 30, 1858 Quincy, Illinois, U.S.
- Died: January 15, 1942 (aged 83) St. Louis, Missouri, U.S.
- Resting place: Bellefontaine Cemetery
- Party: Republican
- Spouse(s): Mollie E. (Flynn) Starkloff, (1879-before 1900); Genevieve (Baldwin) Starkloff (c. 1903)
- Children: 4
- Relatives: Irma S. Rombauer, half-sister Max Starkloff, grandson
- Education: Pennsylvania Military Academy; St. Louis Medical College
- Profession: Physician, surgeon

Max Carl Starkloff (December 30, 1858 – January 15, 1942) was an American physician and the Health Commissioner for St. Louis, Missouri, from 1895 to 1903 and from 1911 to 1933. He is noted for closing all public venues and prohibiting public gatherings of more than 20 people in October 1918 during the 1918 influenza pandemic. His actions are credited as being an early instance in modern medicine of social distancing.

== Family and early life ==
Maximilian Carl von Starkloff was born on December 30, 1858, in Quincy, Illinois, the third son of Hugo Maximilian von Starkloff and Hermine Auguste (Reinhard) Starkloff. Starkloff later dropped the "von" to appear less aristocratic.

His father, Dr. Hugo von Starkloff, was a German immigrant who served the United States Army as a surgeon before and during the American Civil War. He was also a U.S. Consul to Bremen, Germany. Upon his arrival to take up his post, von Starkloff "landed in the middle of the cholera panic and sprang into action, setting up sanitary measures that kept the epidemic from reaching steamers bound for the United States." This "presaged that of his son in the St. Louis influenza epidemic 25 years later."

His half-sister was Irma S. Rombauer, author of the Joy of Cooking. Max Starkloff, his grandson, was a disability rights activist.

Starkloff attended public schools then attended the Pennsylvania Military Academy (now Widener University) in Chester, Pennsylvania. He received his medical degree from the St. Louis Medical College (now the Washington University School of Medicine).

== First tenure and the 1896 St. Louis tornado ==
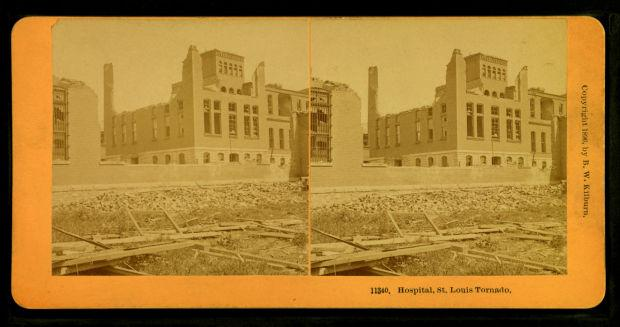
Stereograph of the 1896 St. Louis tornado destruction of City Hospital

St. Louis Mayor Cyrus Walbridge appointed Starkloff to his first term as the Health Commissioner of St. Louis in 1895. He published a pamphlet on how to avoid communicable disease that year.

The next year, the U.S.'s third most deadly tornado of record struck St. Louis, leaving up to a 3-mile-wide (4.8 km) swath of destruction in the urban core, and killing a couple of hundred and injuring a thousand more, in addition to destroying 8,000 buildings.

The city's main hospital, City Hospital, was wrecked. Starkloff started to make his way to the hospital from his office at City Hall when a falling pole knocked him over and broke his right arm. He improvised a sling and then traveled by ambulance to what was left of the hospital. There Starkloff took charge of recovery efforts despite his injury. It was not until after several hours of work that his broken arm was set.

He successfully returned 17 prisoners to the city jail from the hospital's prison ward without incident, and set up a temporary hospital at a vacant convent until several years later when the construction of the replacement City Hospital was sufficiently complete.

Starkloff's first tenure as Health Commissioner ended in 1903.

== Second tenure and the 1918 influenza pandemic ==
=== Reappointment and run for Mayor ===
St. Louis Mayor Frederick Kreismann reappointed Starkloff as Health Commissioner in 1911.

In 1913, Starkloff ran against fellow Republican Henry Kiel for Mayor and lost. Nevertheless, they remained on good terms.

=== Influenza arrives in St. Louis ===
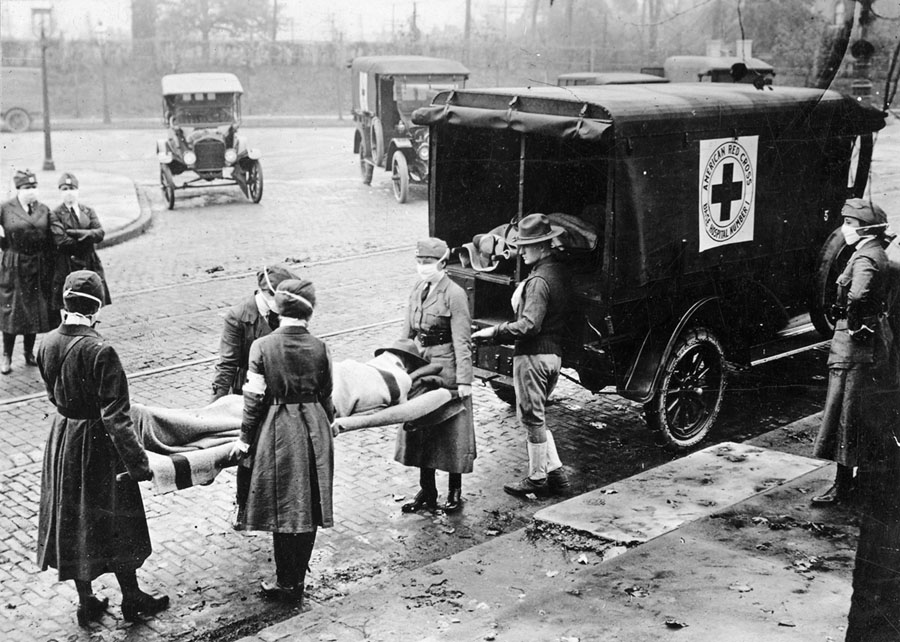
American Red Cross members removing a 1918 flu victim in St. Louis

Aware of the incidence of the flu in New York in early 1918 and particularly in Boston that summer, Starkloff began preparations for St. Louis. He requested that all doctors report each case of influenza to his office. Starkloff then published an article on mitigating pneumonia, advising people to avoid the sick, crowds, alcohol, and fatigue, and to seek fresh air. Although he believed the sick should self-quarantine, he did not yet think that action beyond that was necessary.

In the first few days of October 1918, outbreaks of the pandemic flu began in Missouri. On October 4, Springfield, Missouri had 130 cases. The first case on the Jefferson Barracks Military Post, about 10 miles south of St. Louis, was reported on October 1, and within a week there were 800 cases.

Starkloff asked the Board of Aldermen for special powers, but Mayor Kiel thought that no action should be taken at that time. However, by October 7, 115 influenza cases were reported in St. Louis, and given the nearly thousand cases at Jefferson Barracks, Starkloff thought that drastic action was necessary and prevailed upon Mayor Kiel and the Board of Aldermen to agree to extraordinary measures. On October 8, they gave Starkloff the power to issue public health edicts. They also issued an order for October 8 to close down theaters and other public places, and prohibiting public gatherings of more than 20. The same order required schools to close on October 9.

Although the St. Louis Health Department thought the pandemic under control, the effect of the flu pandemic soon peaked. Authorities recorded 559 flu cases and 32 deaths on October 18, 1918. By November 1, the incidence had declined, and Mayor Kiel asked that restrictions on public gatherings be lifted, but Starkloff refused this for the first ten days of November.

=== Armistice Day and the resurgence of the flu ===
Armistice Day occurred on November 11, 1918. Due to the public holiday, stores were closed, but public celebration occurred outdoors as the people St. Louis celebrated the end of World War I. With the waning of the flu pandemic in St. Louis, Starkloff relented to the gradual reopening of public places.

This proved to be premature, as there was a resurgence of the flu among the young. Schools had reopened on November 14, but by November 28, Starkloff had them closed again and had banned those under 16 "from stores, including department stores, ten-cent stores, and theaters." Influenza cases peaked on December 3 at 1,467, and influenza deaths peaked on December 10 at 58. By year's end, new cases had fallen to 50 a day. Starkloff ended restrictions on December 28, and schools reopened on January 2, 1919.

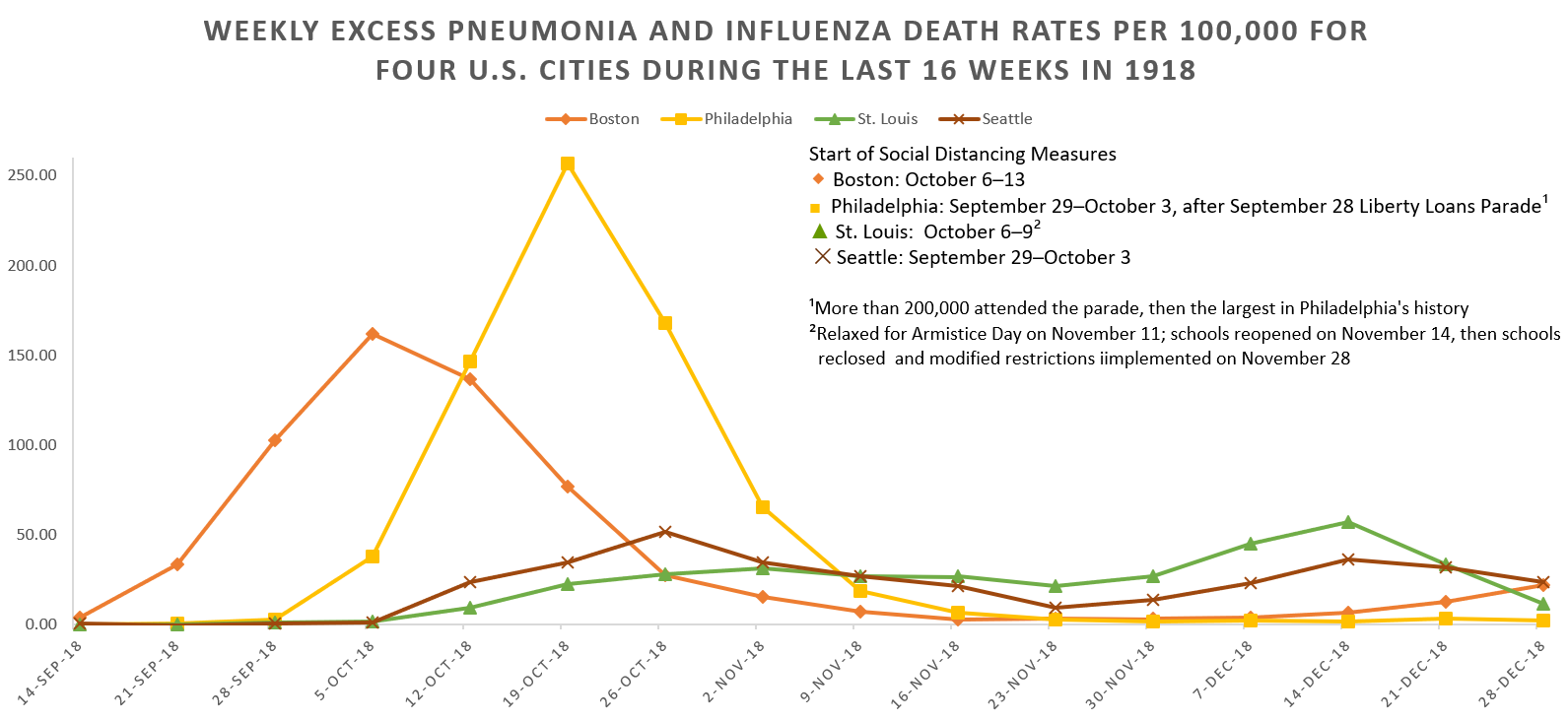
Weekly excess pneumonia and influenza death rates per 100,000 for Boston, Philadelphia, St. Louis, and Seattle during the last 16 weeks in 1918

=== Effectiveness of measures ===
Starkloff's efforts to contain the incidence of flu had two major outcomes. First, St. Louis had one of the lowest death rates from flu in the country. Compared to Philadelphia which permitted a Philadelphia Liberty Loans Parade of 200,000 during the start of the flu pandemic there, St. Louis had half the per capita death rate. Second, Starkloff's intervention served to "flatten the curve." In comparison to Boston's incidence of the flu, which peaked with a death rate of about 160 per 100,000 about two weeks after the first cases, St. Louis had a peak less than 60 per 100,000 about six weeks after the first cases were reported.

== Later life and legacy ==
Starkloff's second tenure as Health Commissioner ended in 1933.

After a decade-long chronic illness, Starkloff died at home of a subsequent bout of pyelonephritis on January 15, 1942. That same year, St. Louis renamed City Hospital to the Max C. Starkloff Memorial Hospital.

As modern day pandemics occur, Starkloff's social distancing precautions continue to be cited in both medical and popular literature, and would be called for again in a coronavirus pandemic a century later.
