= Saul Bruckner =

Saul Bruckner (November 16, 1933–May 1, 2010) was the founding principal of Edward R. Murrow High School in Brooklyn, New York. He was known for his educational philosophy that included giving students freedom and choice. After his death, a street outside of Murrow High School was renamed in his memory.

== Early life and career ==
Saul Bruckner was born in Brooklyn, New York, on November 16, 1933. He graduated from Erasmus Hall High School and Brooklyn College. He married his wife, Ellen Bruckner, in 1963. Bruckner began his teaching career in 1956. Before becoming the founding principal of Edward R. Murrow High School in 1974, he began as a social studies teacher and eventually became Assistant Principal at John Dewey High School. Bruckner served as principal of Murrow High School from 1974 until his retirement in 2004. He taught an advanced placement course in American history until his retirement.

== Educational philosophy ==
Bruckner believed in permitting students freedom.

As a result of this belief, he instituted several policies at Murrow, including unscheduled time for students known as optas. The school had no bells, and students could lounge in the schools hallways during their unsupervised sessions. Bruckner's vision for the school was based in trust for both students and teachers. Under his leadership, the school was known for its collegiate environment.

== Death and street renaming ==
Bruckner died on May 1, 2010, at the age of 76 while swimming in his home in the Mill Basin neighborhood of Brooklyn. The suspected cause of death was a heart attack.

On May 26, 2011, about a year after Bruckner's death, the 17th street entrance to Edward R. Murrow High School was named in his memory. Shortly after his death, calls for the street to be renamed in his memory began in several Facebook groups. On September 2, 2010, community board 14 discussed the street dedication. Hundreds attended the dedication ceremony, including past and current students and teachers. During the ceremony, Brooklyn Borough President Marty Markowitz and Assemblyman Steven Cymbrowitz delivered remarks about Bruckner's career. Markowitz referred to Bruckner as “The last of the educational Mohicans." Two streets signs mark the 17th street entrance as Saul Bruckner Way.
