= The Kings of New York =

2007 book

The Kings of New York: A Year Among the Geeks, Oddballs and Geniuses Who Make Up America's Top High-School Chess Team
- First edition
- Author: Michael Weinreb
- Language: English
- Publisher: Gotham Books
- Publication date: 2007
- Publication place: United States
- Media type: Print (Hardcover)
- Pages: 289
- ISBN: 978-1-59240-261-8
- OCLC: 71800471
- Dewey Decimal: 794.109747/2 22
- LC Class: GV1325.N49 W35 2007

The Kings of New York: A Year Among the Geeks, Oddballs and Geniuses Who Make Up America's Top High-School Chess Team is a 2007 book written by Michael Weinreb, that follows the day-to-day activities of the Edward R. Murrow High School chess team. The team, which included International Masters Alex Lenderman (now a Grandmaster) and Salvijus Bercys, was observed for a year starting in September 2005.

Edward R. Murrow High, situated in Brooklyn, United States, allows students the freedom to devote time to projects of their own choosing. Eliot Weiss, a math teacher and chess fanatic, started a chess club, promoted it vigorously in the media, and took it on tour across the USA. In the process he made it one of the best chess teams in the country. The New York Times called the book "thrilling, vigorously reported" and "deeply empathic." It was also named one of the best nonfiction books of the year by Amazon.com, The Christian Science Monitor, and Publishers Weekly.

While the chess club had already existed. The Edward R. Murrow Chess Team was established during the 1984-1985 school year, playing competitively against other Brooklyn high schools.

The Kings of New York won the 2007 Quill Award as best sports book.
