= Richard Velazquez =

American businessman

- Born: Brooklyn, New York City, US
- Education: Cooper Union; University of California, Berkeley
- Occupation: Business Executive
- Employer: Latinx MBA Association
- Organization(s): ALPFA Advisory Board; Washington State Ferries - Ferry Advisory Committee
- Known for: 1st Puerto Rican Designer for Porsche
- Title: Chief Executive Officer (CEO)
- Website: www.latinxmba.org

Richard Velazquez is an American businessman and the CEO of the national Latinx MBA Association. He was recognized in October 2000 as the 1st Puerto Rican automotive designer for Porsche in Germany, having worked on the design for Porsche's first SUV, the Porsche Cayenne.

== Education ==
Velazquez graduated from Edward R. Murrow High School in Brooklyn, New York. Velazquez received a Bachelor of Engineering in Mechanical Engineering in 1994 from the Cooper Union for the Advancement of Science and Art, a school that at the time granted each successful applicant a full-tuition scholarship. Velazquez then received a Master's of Business Administration from the University of California, Berkeley, Haas School of Business in 2003 on a full-fellowship through the Consortium for Graduate Study in Management (CGSM).

== Career ==
Velazquez began his career as an automotive designer for Honda R&D Americas, Inc. followed by Porsche AG in Stuttgart, Germany. After receiving his MBA, he switched industries and careers, focusing on marketing and product management. He would work at Procter & Gamble in Puerto Rico, Microsoft's Xbox group, PepsiCo, Sound United, and Amazon. He transition to non-profit leadership roles with College Board and Latinx MBA Association.

=== Automotive design ===
Velazquez's automotive design background began while still studying at Cooper Union. He designed utility truck bodies for the Brooklyn Union Gas fleet and competed in the Society of Automotive Engineers (SAE) Mini-Baja East competition. For the Mini-Baja, he designed and built an all-terrain, amphibious vehicle as part of the competition. After Cooper Union, he began work as a Body Design Engineer for Honda R&D Americas, Inc. in 1995 located in Raymond, Ohio. He worked on the designs of the 1997 Acura CL (new model introduction), 1998 Honda Accord Coupe (complete redesign), 2001 Acura CL (complete redesign) and the 2001 Acura MDX (new model introduction).

Velazquez left Honda in 1999 to work for Porsche AG at a newly designed facility in Weissach, Germany to work on Porsche's first SUV, the 2002 Porsche Cayenne (new model introduction). Velazquez went on to work on the designs of the 2003 Porsche 911 (major model change) and the 2004 Porsche Boxster (minor model redesign).

In 2001, Velazquez left automotive design to pursue an MBA at the University of California, Berkeley, Haas School of Business. During the program, he continued to work in the automotive industry, this time as a consultant for Ford de Mexico in the International Business Development (IBD) program evaluating the strategy for Ford's Supplier Park in Hermosillo, Mexico.

=== Marketing and Product Management ===
After Berkeley, Velazquez switched to a marketing role with the Procter and Gamble Commercial Company in Guaynabo, Puerto Rico in 2004. As an Assistant Brand Manager, he focused on marketing consumer packaged goods to the U.S. Hispanic and Puerto Rican markets. He was later recruited by Microsoft's Corporate Marketing Group and relocated to Redmond, Washington. In the Corporate Marketing Group, he worked as a Senior Market Research Manager. He transferred to the Product Planning group at Xbox in July, 2006. He served as guest lecturer at the University of Washington in the areas of Marketing and New Product Development and Design. In 2011, he relocated to New York City for an executive position at PepsiCo. In 2017, he relocated near San Diego to take on the newly formed role of Global Head of Brand for Denon at Sound United. In 2018, he relocated back to Seattle for an international marketing role for the Alexa team at Amazon.

=== Community and professional organizations ===
Velazquez's involvement in professional and community organizations began at the Cooper Union, as one of the founders and the Treasurer for the Society of Hispanic Professional Engineers (SHPE) Cooper Union Student Chapter.

While at Honda, he was the Vice Chair for Region VI of the SHPE National Student Affairs Committee, Vice Chairman for Columbus of the Society of Automotive Engineers Dayton Section, and Chairman of SAE Midwest Mini-Baja Competition. He also founded the Columbus Chapter of the SHPE and was president until leaving for Germany.

At Berkeley, he founded the Hispanic MBA Student Association. In Puerto Rico, he was elected President of the local chapter of the National Society of Hispanic MBAs. After arriving at Microsoft, he co-founded the Seattle Chapter of the National Society of Hispanic MBAs. He was executive vice-president of NSHMBA Seattle Chapter in 2005-2006 and president of the chapter from 2008 until his relocation to New York in 2011.

Velazquez was inducted into the Latino Leaders Magazine Club Leaders of the Future for New York in 2012. He was also inducted into the Diversity MBA Magazine Top 100 Under 50 Executive and Emerging Leaders in 2011. Velazquez was recognized as a Rising Star for the NSHMBA national organization in 2009 and received both a Brillante award and Distinguished Lifetime Leader award from the same organization. Also in 2009, Velazquez was selected as a Puget Sound Business Journal 40 under 40 Honoree. "Puget Sound Business Journal's 40 Under 40 program is the region's premier award program that spotlights the top business leaders under the age of 40 who excel in their industry and show dynamic leadership." Velazquez was a contributor to the business and economy section of tú Decides Newspaper, a bi-lingual English/Spanish newspaper in Washington state. He was also featured in the February/March 2010 issue of Latino Leaders magazine.

== Awards ==
- 1997 Young Engineer of the Year Award – American Society of Mechanical Engineers Central Ohio Section
- 1999 ASME International Old Guard Young Engineer of the Year Nominee
- 2006 Microsoft Corporate Marketing Group MVP
- 2008 Peter E. Haas Public Service Award Nominee, University of California, Berkeley
- 2008 Microsoft Gold Star Award
- 2009 National Society of Hispanic MBAs (NSHMBA) Rising Star
- 2009 Puget Sound Business Journal 40 under 40 Honoree
- 2009 National Society of Hispanic MBAs (NSHMBA) Brillante Award for Excellence
- 2010 National Society of Hispanic MBAs (NSHMBA) Distinguished Leadership Award
- 2010 Hispanic Association on Corporate Responsibility (HACR) Young Hispanic Corporate Achiever Award (YHCA)
- 2011 Diversity MBA Magazine Top 100 under 50 Executives and Emerging Leaders Award
- 2012 Latino Leaders Magazine Club Leaders of the Future Honoree

== See also ==
- List of notable Puerto Ricans
