= Marca Bristo =

American disability rights activist (1953–2019)

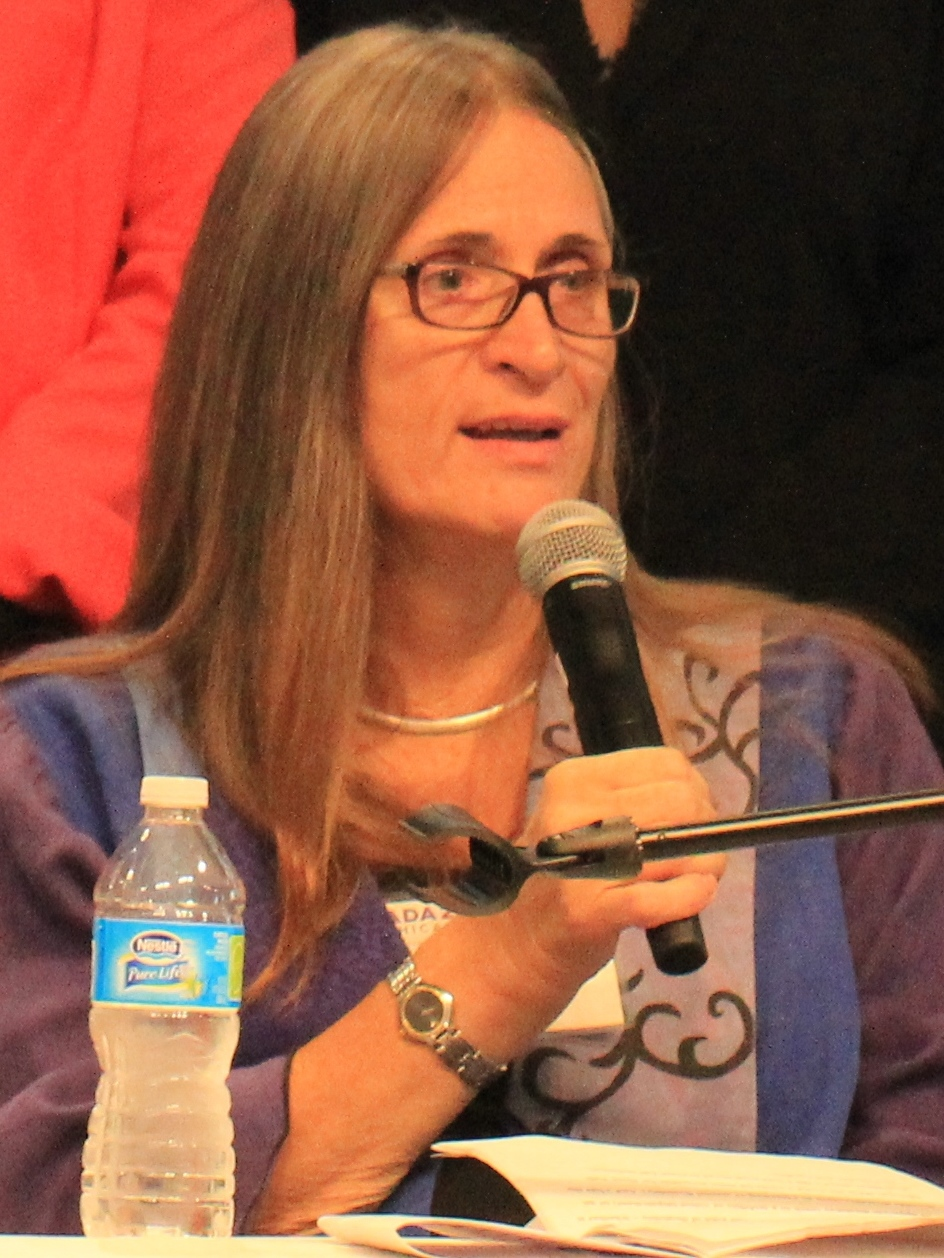
- Bristo in 2015
- Born: Marcia Lynn Bristo; June 23, 1953; Albany, New York, U.S.
- Died: September 8, 2019 (aged 66); Chicago, Illinois, U.S.
- Education: Beloit College; Rush University
- Occupations: Nurse, disability rights advocate
- Known for: Contribution to the Americans with Disabilities Act of 1990

Marca Bristo (June 23, 1953 – September 8, 2019) was an American disability rights activist.

== Life and career ==
Bristo was born Marcia Lynn Bristo on June 23, 1953, in Albany, New York, and was raised on a family farm in Castleton-on-Hudson, New York before moving to West Winfield, New York. She attended Beloit College and earned her nursing degree from Rush University in Chicago. Early in her career, she worked at the Prentice Women's Hospital.

Bristo was paralyzed from the chest down in a diving accident in 1977, when she was 23 years old. In 1983, she co-founded the American National Council on Independent Living (NCIL) with Max Starkloff and Charlie Carr. She helped to write the Americans with Disabilities Act of 1990, was granted the Secretary's Distinguished Service Award, the Americans with Disabilities Act Award and the 2014 Henry Viscardi Achievement Awards. She was also the chair of the American National Council on Disability from 1994 to 2002, and as such was its first disabled chair. In 2014 she became president of the United States International Council on Disabilities. She was also the founding president and chief executive officer of Access Living of Metropolitan Chicago.

Bristo died from cancer at the age of 66 in Chicago.

== Marca Bristo Fellowship ==
Human Rights Watch created the Marca Bristo Fellowship in her memory in 2020. The first recipient was Hauwa Ojeifo, a Nigerian human rights advocate.
