= Jim Flora =

American painter

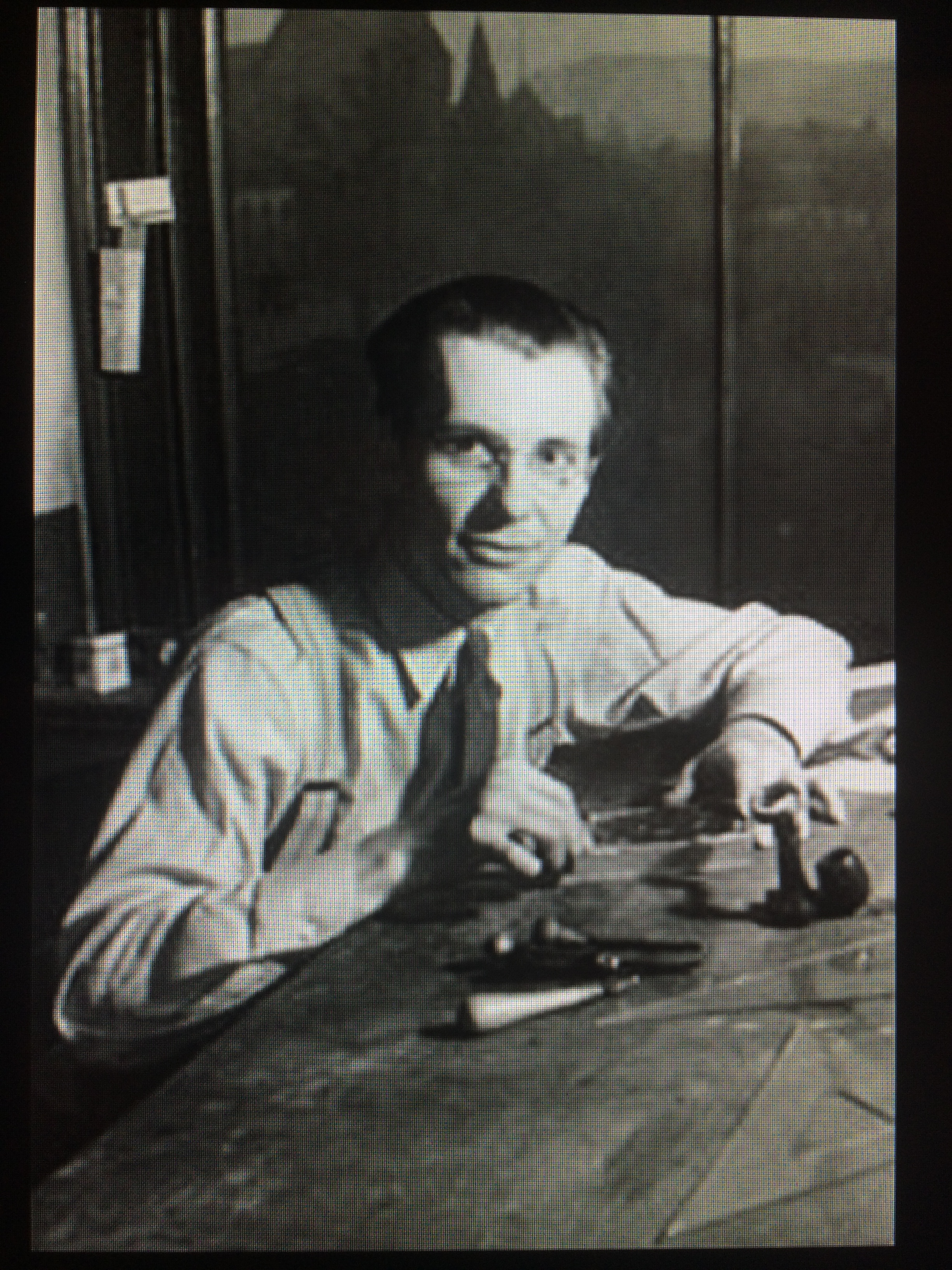
- A young Jim Flora at his art desk.
- Born: James Royer Flora; January 25, 1914; Bellefontaine, Ohio, U.S.
- Died: July 9, 1998 (aged 84); Rowayton, Connecticut, U.S.
- Education: Art Academy of Cincinnati (1935-1939)
- Known for: Painting, commercial art, illustration, children's literature, wood engraving, drawing

James Royer Flora (January 25, 1914 – July 9, 1998) was an American artist best known for his distinctive and idiosyncratic album cover art for RCA Victor and Columbia Records during the 1940s and 1950s. He was also a prolific commercial illustrator from the 1940s to the 1970s, and the author and illustrator of 17 popular children's books. As a fine artist, he created hundreds of paintings, drawings, etchings and sketches throughout his lifetime.

== Life and early career ==
Born in Bellefontaine, Ohio, Flora attended the Art Academy of Cincinnati from 1935 to 1939. In 1938, he met writer Robert Lowry, then a student at the University of Cincinnati. They launched The Little Man Press, a letterpress series of limited edition publications, for which Flora supplied illustrations, design, and layout, and on which they collaborated until 1942. (Lowry later self-published many works under a revived Little Man imprint without Flora's involvement.)

In 1941, Flora married his college sweetheart, artist Jane Sinnicksen. After a brief period as a commercial artist in Cincinnati, he was hired at $55 a week by Columbia Records in 1942, at which time the Floras moved to Westport, Connecticut, since Columbia was then based in Bridgeport.

Beginning work in the art department under Alex Steinweiss, inventor of the illustrated album cover, Flora illustrated ads, new release bulletins, and retail and trade literature. In 1943, when Steinweiss entered the navy, Flora was promoted to art director. Building out his creative team, he hired Richard Staples Dodge and Ginnie Hofmann whom he had known from the Art Academy of Cincinnati.

That year, he launched Columbia's monthly new release booklet, Coda, which he continued illustrating and designing through 1945, when he was promoted to advertising manager. The Floras relocated to Rowayton, Connecticut, where they lived the remainder of their lives, eventually having five children.

Flora's artwork began appearing on Columbia 78 rpm album covers in 1947.

Flora became Columbia's sales promotion manager, but soon grew frustrated with a position where he produced little art. Finally reaching his limit of what he called "endless meetings, endless memos, and wrestling with budgets," he resigned in 1950. He drove to Mexico with his family; they remained south of the border for 15 months, during which time Jim and Jane painted, created woodcuts, and lived as bohemian gringos in Taxco.

== Commercial art and books ==
The Floras returned to Connecticut in 1951, and he embarked on a freelance commercial art career, illustrating covers and articles for dozens of mainstream magazines including Fortune, Holiday, Life, Look, Newsweek, The New York Times Magazine, Mademoiselle, Charm, Research and Engineering, Computer Design, Sports Illustrated, Collier's and Pic.

From January to December 1952, Flora was art director at Park East magazine, for which he published the first commercial illustrations by R.O. Blechman, as well as spot illustrations by the young Andy Warhol. Flora resigned at the end of 1952, and was replaced by Robert M. Jones, who in 1945 had replaced him as art director at Columbia Records.

In March 1953, Jones became art director at RCA Victor Records, where he soon began giving album cover assignments to his friend Flora. This resulted in a Golden Age of Flora LP covers, including such celebrated designs as Mambo For Cats, Inside Sauter-Finegan, Lord Buckley's Hipsters, Flipsters, and Finger-Poppin' Daddies, Knock Me Your Lobes, and Shorty Rogers Courts the Count. Around this time, Flora also did spot jobs for Columbia as a freelancer, illustrating album covers and reviving Coda during 1952 and 1953.

Among his assignments in the 1950s, Flora drew a number of commercial storyboards for the pioneering animation studio United Productions of America (UPA), on assignment from UPA Creative Director Gene Deitch. From September 1955 to August 1956 he was art director for a short-lived technical monthly, Research & Engineering. He illustrated the cover of Computer Design magazine for 17 years (1960s and '70s), and frequent covers for American Legion magazine (1970s).

Between 1955 and 1969, working with children's book editor Margaret K. McElderry at Harcourt Brace, Flora wrote and illustrated 11 books for young readers, including The Fabulous Firework Family (1955), The Day the Cow Sneezed (1957), Charlie Yup and His Snip-Snap Boys (1959) and Leopold, the See-Through Crumbpicker (1961). In 1971, after leaving Harcourt Brace, McElderry accepted a position at Atheneum Books, where she signed Flora between 1972 and 1982 to create six more children's books for her, including Pishtosh, Bullwash, and Wimple (1972) and Stewed Goose (1973).

== Later life ==
After he retired from commercial work in the late 1970s, Flora devoted the remainder of his artistic life to painting and sketching. His nautical canvases were occasionally exhibited, and he marketed posters of some of his large-scale ship-related works.

His wife, Jane, died in 1985. In 1987, he married Patricia Larsen.

In 1994, Flora produced a redrawn and rewritten edition of his first children's book, The Fabulous Firework Family.

In the final years of his life, Flora continued prolifically painting and sketching. "Every day I do something," he told interviewer Steven Guarnaccia in 1998, "I can get here [his downstairs studio] and focus and forget every little ache and pain that I have." He died few months later in Rowayton, Connecticut from stomach cancer.

== Evolving styles ==
Flora had a cartoonish style that in its earliest (1940s and 1950s) incarnations betrayed a diabolic humor and uninhibited sense of outrageousness. Despite a later reputation for "cuddly" kiddie lit and family-friendly illustrations for mainstream magazines, his fine art—both early and late—was by turns bizarre, playful, comic, erotic and/or macabre. It could, on occasion, shock or offend.

His style evolved radically over the decades; comparing his sharp, edgy commercial work of the 1940s to his middlebrow buffoonery of the 1970s sometimes leaves the impression they were done by different artists with the same name. It seemed that the more popular Flora became, the less "threatening" his art appeared. This is certainly true of his commercial work, which softened and became more generic in the 1960s and 1970s.

His independently produced fine art, however, remained highly personally expressive, with much of it including images of violence and sexual excess. (The cover of The Curiously Sinister Art of Jim Flora is adorned with figures from his 1940s absurdist burlesque painting The Rape of the Stationmaster's Daughter.) Many of his smaller temperas and pen-and-ink sketches, particularly from the 1940s through the 1960s, featured clusters of unrelated images, including bizarre and disturbing figures, interlocking like rune-shaped brickwork. As Flora explained, "I could never stand a static space." Flora often listened to music while painting and drawing; his biographer, Irwin Chusid, said that Flora "crafted rhythmic design in unfathomable meters."

Flora also established a reputation in the 1980s for large canvases with nautical themes, particularly ocean liners and cruise ships—the decks sometimes populated with tiny figures engaged in pornographic behavior. "When he was in his ship period," said his daughter Roussie, "he painted lots of naughty little scenes going on inside. He would have exhibitions, and the galleries would set out a basket of magnifying glasses. You would see all these old ladies clustered around the paintings trying to see what was going on in the portholes."

His early illustration style has influenced many contemporary artists, including, Derek Yaniger, Shag (Josh Agle), Tim Biskup, children's book author Lane Smith ("I was always inspired by the spontaneity and animation in Flora's work"), and Pixar animator Pete Docter, along with such illustrators as J.D. King, Michael Bartalos, J. Otto Seibold, Phillip Anderson, and Terry Allen.

Despite his reputation for humorous themes and penchant for caricature, and the undeniable influence of cartoon art on his work, Flora never created comics. He was primarily an artist, and incidentally a humorist. J.D. King observed, "Even in Flora's fine art, there's a feel of the Sunday funnies, the Great American Comic Strip when it was actually great. And comical."

== Legacy ==
The Flora family archive contains hundreds of paintings, sketches and long-unseen commercial assignments. A few years after the artist's death, his paintings and fine art began achieving recognition thanks to the research and cataloging of co-archivists Irwin Chusid and Barbara Economon, who have compiled four anthologies of Flora's work: The Mischievous Art of Jim Flora (2004), The Curiously Sinister Art of Jim Flora (2007), The Sweetly Diabolic Art of Jim Flora (2009), and The High Fidelity Art of Jim Flora (2013), all published by Fantagraphics Books. Flora's second children's book, The Day the Cow Sneezed (1957), was reprinted in 2010 by Enchanted Lion Books who also reprinted his fifth, Kangaroo for Christmas (1962) in Fall 2011.

Vintage Flora images have appeared on new CD covers: Reptet's release Do This! (2006, Monktail Records) used an early 1950s Flora "triclops" figure; Whirled Chamber Music (2007, ViolinJazz Recordings) by the twice Grammy-nominated Quartet San Francisco features a detail from a 1960s Flora painting entitled Barberinni; and the album Ectoplasm (2008, Basta Audio-Visuals), a collection of late 1940s recordings by the Raymond Scott Quintet, features a 1951 Flora illustration.

Many artists have been influenced by Flora's work, others have parodied his style. One of Flora's album covers, the 1955 RCA Victor release This is Benny Goodman and his Orchestra, was parodied twice: on a 1998 Pearl Jam tour poster and on the cover art for the 2000 CD Oscillate My Metallic Sonatas by the theremin band, The Lothars. The cover of the 2003 CD Conviction by slam poet Taylor Mali parodied Flora's 1947 cover art for Gene Krupa and His Orchestra.

In the film Monsters, Inc. (Pixar, 2001), an abstract poster on Sullivan's bedroom wall is a distinct mimic of Flora's style.

== Bibliography ==
- 1955 – The Fabulous Firework Family
- 1957 – The Day the Cow Sneezed
- 1959 – Charlie Yup and his Snip-Snap Boys
- 1961 – Leopold and the see-through crumbpicker
- 1962 – Kangaroo for Christmas
- 1964 – My Friend Charlie
- 1965 – Grandpa's Farm
- 1966 – Sherwood Walks Home
- 1967 – Fishing with Dad
- 1968 – The Joking Man
- 1969 – Little Hatchy Hen
- 1972 – Pishtosh, Bullwash & Wimple
- 1973 – Stewed Goose
- 1976 – The Great Green Turkey Creek Monster
- 1978 – Grandpa's Ghost Stories
- 1980 – Wanda and the Bumbly Wizard
- 1982 – Grandpa's Witched-up Christmas
