= Ginnie Hofmann =

American artist and illustrator

- Born: Virginia Ritsman; September 30, 1920; Toledo, Ohio, U.S.
- Died: December 29, 2014 (aged 94); Fort Lee, New Jersey, U.S.
- Education: Art Academy of Cincinnati (1938–1942)
- Known for: Painting, commercial art, illustration, children's literature, drawing

Ginnie Hofmann (September 30, 1920 – December 29, 2014) was an American artist and illustrator most noted for her illustrations in the Joy of Cooking and her paper dolls in Betsy McCall magazine.

== Early years ==
Born as Virginia Ritsman in Toledo, Ohio, she attended the Art Academy of Cincinnati from 1938-1942 with James Flora and Richard Staples Dodge.

In July 1944, she married Edward Hofmann whom she remained married to until his death in 1990.

== Professional life ==
In early 1944, at the request of Flora who had recently been promoted to Art Director at Columbia Records, she moved to Westport, Connecticut. She worked as an illustrator at Columbia Records for two years.

Hofmann illustrated the Joy of Cooking, beginning with the Fourth Edition from 1951. Closely associated with the Joy of Cooking aesthetic, her illustrations continue to be used through the current edition.

For 27 years, between 1958 and 1986, Hofmann drew the paper dolls feature in Betsy McCall magazine.

Throughout her career, Hofmann contributed illustrations to other magazines including Mademoiselle (1946–1951), Parents Magazine, Good Housekeeping (1950–1960), and Woman's Day (1950–1960).

== Bibliography ==
Hofmann wrote and illustrated a series of children's books about the comforts and companionship of the teddy bear.

- 1978 - Who Wants an Old Teddy Bear?
- 1986 - The Runaway Teddy Bear
- 1991 - One Teddy Bear is Enough!
- 1994 - The Bear Next Door
- 1996 - The Big Bad Bully Bear

She also illustrated Betsy McCall: A Paper Doll Story Book (A Little Golden Book).
