= Aleksandr Lenderman =

American chess grandmaster (born 1989)

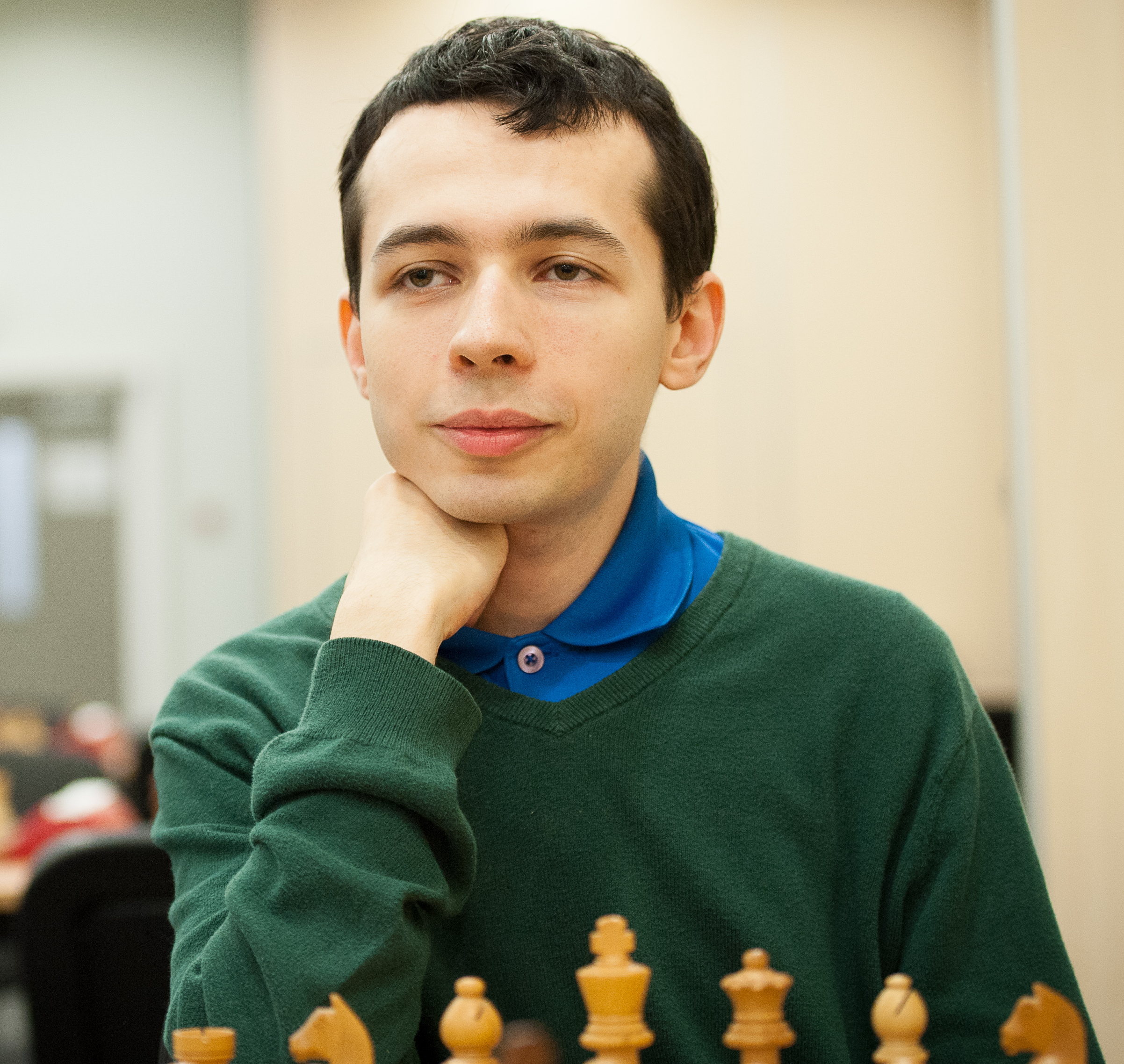
- Lenderman in 2016

Personal information
- Born: Александр Лендерман; September 23, 1989 (age 37) Leningrad, Russian SFSR, Soviet Union

Chess career
- Country: United States
- Title: Grandmaster (2010)
- FIDE rating: 2459 (November 2026)
- Peak rating: 2654 (August 2019)
- Peak ranking: No. 97 (August 2019)

Aleksandr "Alex" Lenderman (born September 23, 1989) is an American chess grandmaster. He won the 2005 World Under-16 Championship in Belfort with a score of 9/10 (+8 −0 =2), becoming the first American to win a gold medal at the World Youth Chess Championship since Tal Shaked won the World Junior Championship in 1997.

== Early life ==
Born in Leningrad, he arrived with his family in Brooklyn when he was four. He attended Edward R. Murrow High School in Brooklyn where he played for one of the most successful U.S. high school chess teams of the decade, winning multiple national chess championships.

== Chess career ==
Lenderman attended Edward R. Murrow High School in Brooklyn where, from 2004 to 2007, he was part of the "dream team" winning four straight national high school titles for the school, along with now International Master Salvijus Bercys. He played an important role in the book The Kings of New York, written by Michael Weinreb and published by Gotham Press in 2007.

Lenderman was first in the 2008 USCF Grand Prix, scoring higher than all the grandmasters he competed against by playing and championing in smaller events, including WCL tournaments.

In 2009, he announced after completing his second year at Brooklyn College, he planned to end his studies there and become a professional chess player. He finished first in the 2009 Atlantic Open, in front of several other GMs. He also won the 2009 USCF Grand Prix and was a co-champion of the 2009 U.S. Open. Lenderman earned three Grandmaster norms in quick succession in the summer of 2009:

- He earned his first Grandmaster norm at the Copper State International tournament in Mesa AZ, May 29 to June 3, 2009 .
- A second GM norm was earned at the Philadelphia International Tournament, June 25–29, 2009 .
- He earned his third GM norm on July 5, 2009, at the World Open in Philadelphia.

In 2014 he won the 18th Open International Bavarian Chess Championship in Bad Wiessee on tiebreak over Robert Hovhannisyan and Ante Saric, after they all tied for first with a score of 7.5/9 points.

Lenderman played for USA team in the 2015 World Team Chess Championship in Tsaghkadzor and scored 5/7, winning the gold medal on the second board. He won the 2015 World Open after beating Rauf Mamedov in an armageddon playoff; the two had the best tiebreak among eight players who tied for first place with 7/9.

In September 2017, Lenderman participated in the Chess World Cup as the No. 104 seed in the field of 128 players. He upset Pavel Eljanov 2–0 in the first round and Aryan Tari 1.5-0.5 in the second, before losing on tiebreak in the third round to Maxime Vachier-Lagrave.

Later in the same month, Lenderman played in the Chess.com Isle of Man Open, where he finished with a record of +3-0=6, which included a win against Francisco Vallejo Pons, and a performance rating of 2768. His final score of 6/9 placed him in joint 10th to 18th place.

== Personal life ==
Lenderman was born into a Jewish family but converted to Christianity in his 20s. He is currently a student at Webster University.
