= National Council on Independent Living =

U.S. nonprofit organization

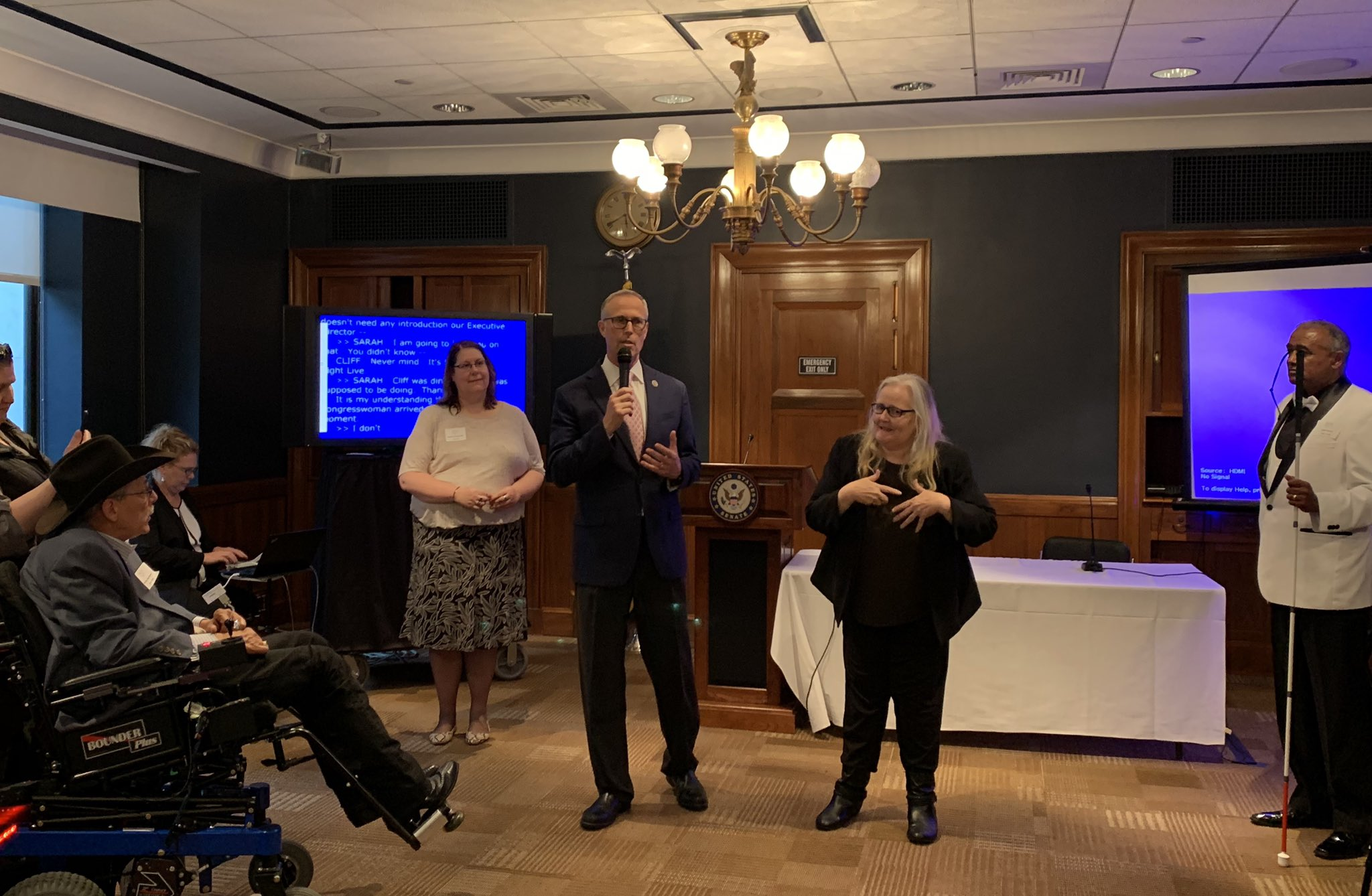
A NCIL event with Congressman Jared Huffman as a speaker in 2020

The National Council on Independent Living (NCIL) is an American nonprofit organization focused on disability rights advocacy. It is a membership organization of centers for independent living that provide services, advocacy, and referrals to people with disabilities; statewide independent living councils; and other organizations with related missions. NCIL works with the non-partisan VoteRiders organization to spread state-specific information on voter ID requirements.

NCIL was founded in 1982 by Marca Bristo, Charlie Carr, and Max Starkloff. The first independent living program was founded by disability rights activist Ed Roberts as a college student in Berkeley, California.

NCIL hosts an annual conference in Washington, D.C., that includes a rally and march. NCIL's online news publication is The Advocacy Monitor.

NCIL advised on the design of a "low entry ramp" to promote wheelchair-accessible entry for Motor Coach Industries' new buses. In 2019, NCIL launched the Elevate Campaign Training program to train people with disabilities to run for elected office. NCIL also collaborated with a health insurance corporation, Centene, on a project called the Provider Accessibility Initiative to improve health care for people with disabilities by increasing the number of medical care providers whose offices and services meet accessibility standards.
