= Marley & Me =

2005 book by John Grogan

- Author: John Grogan
- Language: English
- Genre: Autobiographical novel
- Publisher: HarperCollins (US), Hodder & Stoughton (UK)
- Publication date: October 18, 2005
- Publication place: United States
- Media type: Print (hardcover), audiobook, e-book
- Pages: 304 pp
- ISBN: 0-06-081708-9
- OCLC: 58431841
- Dewey Decimal: 636.752/7/092 B 22
- LC Class: SF429.L3 G76 2005

Marley & Me: Life and Love with the World's Worst Dog is an autobiographical book by journalist John Grogan, published in 2005, about the 13 years he and his family spent with their yellow Labrador Retriever, Marley. The dog is poorly behaved and destructive, and the book covers the issues this causes in the family as they learn to accept him in addition to their grief following Marley's death. It was subsequently adapted by the author into three separate books, as well as into a comedy-drama film released in 2008.

== Story ==
Told in first-person narrative, the book portrays Grogan and his family's life during the 13 years that they lived with their dog Marley, and the relationships and lessons from this period. Marley, a yellow Labrador Retriever, is described as a high-strung, boisterous, and somewhat uncontrollable dog. He is strong, powerful, endlessly hungry, energetic, and often destructive of their property (but completely without malice). Marley routinely fails to understand what humans expect of him; at one point, mental illness is suggested as a plausible explanation for his behavior. His acts and behaviors are forgiven, however, since it is clear that he has a heart of gold and is merely living within his nature.

Marley was filmed for a two-minute credited appearance in the 1996 movie The Last Home Run.

The strong contrast between the problems and tensions caused by his neuroses and behavior, and the undying devotion, love and trust shown towards the human family as they themselves have children and grow up to accept him for what he is, and their grief when he finally dies from gastric dilatation volvulus (a stomach torsion condition) in old age, form the backdrop for the biographical material of the story.

In his autobiography, Grogan states that the eulogy he wrote in newspaper following Marley's death received more responses than any other column he had written in his professional life up until that point. In a discussion on his website devoted to the book, he reflects on his family's time with Marley, and the lessons learned, and concludes that: "[C]ommitment matters. That 'in good times and bad, in sickness and in health' really means something. We didn't give up on Marley when it would have been easy to, and in the end he came through and proved himself a great and memorable pet."

== Adaptations ==
Marley & Me has been rewritten into three different books:

- Marley: A Dog Like No Other, for younger readers who would enjoy reading about Marley's story, without the sexual content in the original
- Bad Dog, Marley!, a picture book for readers learning to read in lower grade levels
- A Very Marley Christmas

In 2008, the novel was adapted into a family comedy-drama motion picture, also titled Marley & Me. Released on December 25, 2008, the film stars Owen Wilson and Jennifer Aniston and is directed by David Frankel. A direct-to-video prequel followed in 2011, Marley & Me: The Puppy Years.
