= Marion Rombauer Becker =

American cookbook writer (1903–1976)

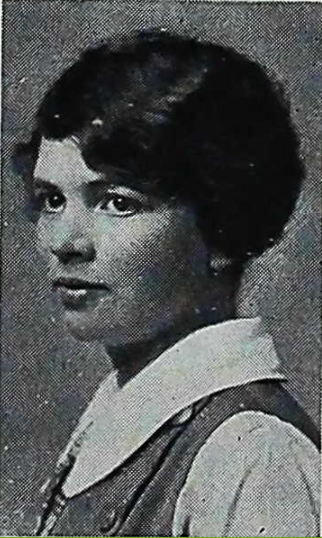
- Marion In 1925
- Born: January 2, 1903; St. Louis, Missouri, U.S.
- Died: December 28, 1976 (aged 73)
- Education: Vassar College
- Occupations: illustrator, author, environmentalist, and arts administrator
- Notable work: illustrating the original The Joy of Cooking
- Spouse: John William Becker

Marion Rombauer Becker (2 January 1903 – 28 December 1976) was an American illustrator, author, environmentalist, and arts administrator. She is best known for her work illustrating the original The Joy of Cooking, which she co-authored with her mother Irma von Starkloff Rombauer, and continued to update after her mother's death.

== Life ==
Marion Rombauer was born in St. Louis in 1903. She attended Vassar College, graduating in 1925 with degrees in art history and French. She was interested in art, and served as the art director at the John Burroughs School from 1928 to 1932. Following the death of her father by suicide in 1930, she moved into an apartment with her mother, where they personally tested out the recipes for the cookbook. Marion designed the book, cover art, and illustrations for the first edition of The Joy of Cooking.

In 1932, Marion married an architect named John William Becker and began working as the art director at the Hillsdale School in Cincinnati. She went on to serve as the first professional director of the Modern Art Society of Cincinnati (now known as the Contemporary Arts Center) from 1942 to 1947. In 1955, Becker was diagnosed with breast cancer and underwent a mastectomy.

Becker was passionate about gardening and botany, and co-authored a book about wild plants and flowers called Wild Wealth with ecologist Paul Sears and Frances Jones Poetker in 1971. She spent 35 years cultivating growth of wild American plants in her gardens and corresponded with many prominent botanists. A boxwood cutting Becker took from her home garden and gave to the Missouri Botanical Garden so deeply impressed the members of the Boxwood Society of the Midwest that they had it officially registered as Buxus sempervirens Joy in her honor. She also served as secretary for the board of the Cincinnati Nature center from its founding in 1966 until her death.

Following the death of her mother in 1962, Becker took over updating new editions of The Joy of Cooking. The last edition of the book published under her eye was the sixth, which was published in 1975, considered to be a fan favorite and the bestselling edition to date. Following her death, the University of Cincinnati Medical Center named a medicinal herb garden in her honor. She was also given an Ohio Governor's Award in 1976 and was the first woman to be named a "great living Cincinnatian".
