= John Grogan =

American journalist (born 1957)

- Born: March 20, 1957 (age 69); Detroit, Michigan, U.S.
- Spouse: Jenny Vogt (m. 1989)
- Children: 3
- Writing career
- Notable awards: Quill Award; National Press Club's Consumer Journalism Award

John Joseph Grogan (/ˈɡroʊɡən/ GROH-gən; born March 20, 1957) is an American journalist and non-fiction writer. His memoir Marley & Me (2005) was a best-selling book about his family's dog, Marley.

== Early life ==
Grogan was born to a Catholic family of Irish descent in Detroit, Michigan on March 20, 1957, the youngest of four siblings.

His father, Richard, was an engineer for General Motors and a Navy veteran, while his mother, Ruth Marie, was a stay-at-home mom. Not long after he was born, the family moved to Harbor Hills, in Orchard Lake Village, Michigan. The neighborhood served as the setting for much of his memoir, The Longest Trip Home.

Grogan notes that his mother's passion and gift for storytelling "wore off" on him. By eighth grade (1970–71) at the Our Lady of Refuge, he was writing humorous stories about the nuns. He transferred from Brother Rice Catholic High to a public high school, West Bloomfield High School (class of 1975), as a sophomore. He wrote for his school newspaper in high school and started an underground tabloid.

He attended Central Michigan University, where he double majored in Journalism and English, and wrote for the school newspaper, CM-Life.

== Career ==
His first college internship was at a community weekly paper called The Spinal Column. Upon graduation from Central Michigan University in 1979, he was hired as a police reporter for the St. Joseph Herald-Palladium. In 1985, he received a fellowship into the Kiplinger Mid-Career Program in Public Affairs Reporting at Ohio State University, where he earned a master's degree in Journalism, graduating in 1986. He was later accepted as a fellow at the Poynter Institute of Media Studies in St. Petersburg, Florida. After the fellowship, he was hired as a bureau reporter at the South Florida Sun-Sentinel in Fort Lauderdale, eventually promoted to metropolitan columnist. In 1999, he was named managing editor of Rodale's Organic Gardening magazine and moved to Pennsylvania. Three years later, in 2002, he joined The Philadelphia Inquirer as a columnist. The Inquirer published a volume of his best articles in 2007 called Bad Dogs Have More Fun.

His journalistic career of over 20 years has won him several state and national awards, including the National Press Club's Consumer Journalism Award.

In 2007, he began working full-time on his new book, a memoir, The Longest Trip Home. It was released on October 21, 2008. The Longest Trip Home is a coming of age memoir about Grogan's relationship with his family, particularly with his parents, revolving around the theme of "powerful love of family." According to his website, it is "a book for any son or daughter who has sought to forge an identity at odds with their parents', and for every parent who has struggled to understand the values of their children."

In the spring of 2012, he joined Lehigh University as an adjunct professor in the department of journalism and communication. He teaches a writing course called Memoir and Me: First-Person Non-Fiction Narratives.

== Marley & Me ==
In 2003, when Grogan's dog, Marley, died at age thirteen, Grogan wrote a column in The Philadelphia Inquirer honoring him. Grogan received over 800 responses from his readers. The readers' astounding response and interest in Marley sparked Grogan's decision to write a book, due to the realization that he had "a bigger story to tell" and "owed it to Marley to tell the rest of the story."

In 2004, Grogan began writing Marley & Me, which is told in first-person narrative. Marley is a yellow Labrador Retriever, boisterous, somewhat uncontrolled, powerful and often destructive of property but loyal and loving and always forgiven. Released in 2005, Marley & Me was an international bestseller, having sold over five million copies in over thirty languages. It spent 76 weeks on the bestseller list, and 23 of those weeks it stood at the #1 spot. His first book earned him Quill Awards in the Audiobook and Memoir/Biography categories in 2006. It was later adapted into a film that was released on December 25, 2008, starring Owen Wilson as Grogan.

The success of the book led to several spin-off children's books, including Bad Dog, Marley, A Very Marley Christmas, and Marley Goes to School.

== Personal life ==
Grogan met his future wife, Jenny Vogt, while working at the Herald-Palladium, where she was also a reporter on the staff. They married on September 2, 1989 at Our Lady of Refuge Church, Orchard Lake Village, Michigan. They have two sons and a daughter.

While working at the Sun-Sentinel, Grogan played bass in a newsroom rock band called The DropHeds, consisting of amateur members from the Miami Herald and Fort Lauderdale Sun-Sentinel.

Grogan lives in Coopersburg, rural eastern Pennsylvania, in a 1790 farm home with his wife, Jenny, and a Labrador retriever, Louie. After Marley's death, they had adopted another dog, Gracie; she died in early 2012 from a complication of Lyme disease. They later adopted Woodson (one of the dogs who portrayed Marley in the film version), who passed in 2020. Grogan continues to write full-time.

== Bibliography ==
Memoirs

- Marley and Me: Life and Love with the World's Worst Dog. New York City: William Morrow, 2005
- The Longest Trip Home: A Memoir. New York City: William Morrow, 2008.

Children's Books

- Bad Dog, Marley! New York City: HarperCollins, 2007.
- Marley: A Dog Like No Other (adapted from Marley & Me). New York City: HarperCollins, 2007.
- A Very Marley Christmas. New York City: HarperCollins, 2008.
- Marley Goes to School. New York City: HarperCollins, 2009.
- Marley Steals the Show. New York: HarperFestival, 2010.
- Marley and the Runaway Pumpkin. New York City: HarperCollins, 2010.
- Sit, Marley, Sit! New York City: HarperFestival, 2010.
- Marley and the Kittens. New York City: HarperCollins, 2010.
- Christmas is Coming Marley. New York City: HarperFestival, 2010.
- Snow Dog Marley. New York City: HarperCollins, 2010.
- Marley Looks for Love. New York City: HarperFestival, 2010.
- Marley: Farm Dog. New York City: HarperCollins, 2011.
- Marley Springs Ahead! New York City: HarperFestival, 2011.
- Marley: Messy Dog. New York City: HarperCollins, 2011.
- Trick or Treat, Marley! New York City: HarperCollins, 2011.
