= Ethan Becker =

American cookbook author

Ethan Becker is an American knife maker. He is the son of Marion and John William Becker and grandson of Irma Starkloff Rombauer, the author of The Joy of Cooking. Becker studied at Cordon Bleu in Paris in 1971 and "was entrusted with" authorship of the book in 1976 by his mother.
