= Marley & Me (film) =

2008 film by David Frankel

- Theatrical release poster
- Directed by: David Frankel
- Screenplay by: Scott Frank; Don Roos
- Based on: Marley & Me by John Grogan
- Produced by: Karen Rosenfelt; Gil Netter
- Starring: Owen Wilson; Jennifer Aniston; Eric Dane; Alan Arkin
- Cinematography: Florian Ballhaus
- Edited by: Mark Livolsi
- Music by: Theodore Shapiro
- Production companies: Fox 2000 Pictures; Regency Enterprises; Sunswept Entertainment; Dune Entertainment
- Distributed by: 20th Century Fox
- Release date: December 25, 2008 (United States)
- Running time: 115 minutes
- Country: United States
- Language: English
- Budget: $60 million
- Box office: $247.8 million

Marley & Me is a 2008 American comedy-drama film directed by David Frankel from a screenplay by Scott Frank and Don Roos, based on the 2005 memoir of the same name by John Grogan. It stars Owen Wilson and Jennifer Aniston as the owners of Marley, a Labrador retriever.

Marley & Me was released by 20th Century Fox in the United States and Canada on December 25, 2008, and set a record for the largest Christmas Day box office ever with $14.75 million in ticket sales. The film received mixed reviews from critics and went on to gross $247.8 million against a $60 million budget. A direct-to-video prequel, Marley & Me: The Puppy Years, followed in 2011.

== Plot ==
After newlyweds John and Jenny Grogan relocate from Michigan to South Florida, they obtain reporter jobs at rival newspaper firms. At The Palm Beach Post, Jenny immediately receives prominent front-page assignments, while at the South Florida Sun-Sentinel, John finds himself writing obituaries and mundane two-paragraph news articles.

When John senses Jenny is contemplating motherhood, his friend and co-worker, Sebastian Tunney, suggests adopting a dog to test their readiness to have a baby. They choose a yellow Labrador Retriever puppy that John names Marley (after hearing a Bob Marley song on the radio).

A year later, Marley, now weighing about 100 pounds, proves to be incorrigible, forcing John and Jenny to enroll him in a dog obedience class. The unruly dog is expelled, and the decision is made to have Marley neutered.

Editor Arnie Klein offers John a twice-weekly column writing about anything he likes. Initially stumped for ideas, John realizes that Marley's misadventures might be the perfect topic for his first column. Arnie loves it, and Marley's continual wreaking havoc on the household provides John with endless sources of material. The column's popularity eventually helps double the paper's circulation.

Jenny become pregnant but miscarries early in her first trimester, devastating the couple. They have a belated honeymoon in Ireland, leaving Marley in the care of a young woman house sitter who is unable to control him. John and Jenny return to a severely damaged house.

Shortly after their return from Ireland, Jenny becomes pregnant again and delivers a healthy boy, Patrick. When a second son, Conor, arrives, Jenny decides to quit her job; so John takes on a daily column for a doubled salary. With a growing family and concerns over the neighborhood's increasing crime rate, Jenny and John move to a larger house in Boca Raton; where Marley delights in swimming in the backyard pool.

Stressed and exhausted with raising two small children, Jenny becomes increasingly impatient and irritable with Marley and also John. Sebastian takes Marley for a few days after Jenny, upset and angry, demands that John find him a new home. Jenny quickly decides Marley is an indispensable family member. A few years later, Jenny gives birth to their third child, a daughter, Colleen.

After turning 40, and envious when Sebastian is hired by The New York Times, John grows dissatisfied with being a columnist. With Jenny's blessing, he accepts a reporter job with The Philadelphia Inquirer, and the family moves to a farm in rural Pennsylvania. John soon realizes he is a better columnist than a reporter and pitches a column idea to his editor.

The family feels happy with their lives until the elderly Marley suffers a near-fatal intestinal disorder. He recovers, but his stomach later twists a second time. Too old for corrective surgery, Marley is euthanized with John at his side. The family pays their last respects to Marley as they bury him beneath a tree in their front yard.

== Cast ==
- Owen Wilson as John Grogan
- Jennifer Aniston as Jenny Grogan
- Eric Dane as Sebastian Tunney
- Alan Arkin as Arnie Klein
- Haley Hudson as Debbie
- Haley Bennett as Lisa
- Kathleen Turner as Ms. Kornblut
- Ann Dowd as Dr. Platt
- Nathan Gamble as Patrick Grogan (Age 10)
  - Bryce Robinson as Patrick Grogan (Age 7)
  - Dylan Henry as Patrick Grogan (Age 3)
- Finley Jacobsen as Conor Grogan (Age 8)
  - Ben Hyland as Conor Grogan (Age 5)
- Lucy Merriam as Colleen Grogan (Age 5)

== Production ==
Because the film covers 14 years in the life of the dog, 22 different yellow labradors played the part of Marley.

The film was shot on location in Florida's West Palm Beach, Fort Lauderdale, Hollywood, Miami, and Dolphin Stadium, in addition to Philadelphia and West Chester in Pennsylvania. The Irish honeymoon scenes were shot in and around Ballynahinch Castle, in Connemara, County Galway, Ireland.

The film's score was composed by Theodore Shapiro, who previously had worked with director Frankel on The Devil Wears Prada. He recorded it with the Hollywood Studio Symphony at the Newman Scoring Stage at 20th Century Fox.

Dave Barry, Grogan's fellow South Florida humor columnist, makes an uncredited cameo as a guest at the surprise party celebrating Grogan's 40th birthday.

== Reception ==
=== Box office ===
The film opened on 3,480 screens in the US and Canada on December 25, 2008. It grossed $14.75 million on its first day of release, setting the record for the best Christmas Day box office take ever by surpassing the previous high of $10.2 million achieved by Ali in 2001 (the record was broken the following year by Sherlock Holmes). It earned a total of $51.7 million over the four-day weekend and placed #1 at the box office, a position it maintained for two weeks. The film ended its run having grossed $143.2 million in the US and $104.7 million in foreign markets for a total worldwide box office of $247.8 million.

=== Critical response ===
Marley & Me received mixed reviews from critics. On Rotten Tomatoes the film holds a rating of 64% based on 141 reviews, with an average rating of 6.20/10. The site's critical consensus reads, "Pet owners should love it, but Marley and Me is only sporadically successful in wringing drama and laughs from its scenario." On Metacritic, the film has a score of 53 out of 100, based on 30 critics, indicating "mixed or average reviews". Audiences polled by CinemaScore gave the film an average grade of "A" on an A+ to F scale.

Todd McCarthy of Variety said the film is "as broad and obvious as it could be, but delivers on its own terms thanks to sparky chemistry between its sunny blond stars, Owen Wilson and Jennifer Aniston, and the unabashed emotion-milking of the final reel. Fox has a winner here, likely to be irresistible to almost everyone but cats ... Animated and emotionally accessible, Aniston comes off better here than in most of her feature films, and Wilson spars well with her, even if, in the film's weaker moments, he shows he's on less certain ground with earnest material than he is with straight-faced impertinence."

Kirk Honeycutt of The Hollywood Reporter observed that "seldom does a studio release feature so little drama—and not much comedy either, other than when the dog clowns around ... [W]hatever Marley wants to be about—the challenges of marriage or the balancing act between career and family—gets subsumed by pet tricks. Dog lovers won't care, and that basically is the audience for the film. From Fox's standpoint, it may be enough ... Marley & Me is a warm and fuzzy family movie, but you do wish that at least once someone would upstage the dog."

Roger Ebert of the Chicago Sun-Times called the film "a cheerful family movie" and added, "Wilson and Aniston demonstrate why they are gifted comic actors. They have a relationship that's not too sitcomish, not too sentimental, mostly smart and realistic", whilst Owen Gleiberman of Entertainment Weekly graded the film A−, calling it "the single most endearing and authentic movie about the human-canine connection in decades. As directed by David Frankel, though, it's also something more: a disarmingly enjoyable, wholehearted comic vision of the happy messiness of family life."

Steve Persall of the St. Petersburg Times was also very positive, graded the film B and commented, "Marley & Me practically leaps at viewers like a pound puppy seeking affection, and darn if it doesn't deserve some ... Things could get mushier or sillier, but Frankel and screenwriters Scott Frank and Don Roos—who usually handle grittier material—decline to play the easy, crowd-pleasing game. Their faith in Grogan's simple tale of loyalty among people and pets is unique, and it pays off ... [It] isn't extraordinary cinema, but it relates to everyday people in the audience in a way that few movies do without being dull."

Walter Addiego of SFGate said, "This love letter to man's best friend will make dog fanciers roll over and do tricks. It's so warmhearted, you'll want to run out and hug the nearest big, sloppy mutt." The praise continued with Carrie Rickey of The Philadelphia Inquirer awarding the film three out of four stars and saying, "Marley and Me operates on the assumption that happiness is a warm tongue bath. And those who endorse this belief will enjoy this shaggy dog story ... The anecdotal structure does not make for a gripping movie. For one thing, there's no conflict, unless you count the tension between a guy and his untrainable pooch. Yet Marley boasts animal magnetism ... Mawkish? Sometimes. But often very funny and occasionally very moving."

In a negative review, Betsy Sharkey of the Los Angeles Times calling it "an imperfect, messy and sometimes trying film that has moments of genuine sweetness and humor sprinkled in between the saccharine and the sadness." Peter Bradshaw of The Guardian was unimpressed, awarding the film one out of five stars and commenting, "the relentless gooey yuckiness and fatuous stereotyping in this weepy feelbad comedy gave me the film critic's equivalent of a boiling hot nose," while Philip French of the same publication wrote "the one redeeming feature is the presence as Wilson's editor of that great deadpan, put-on artist Alan Arkin, a comedian who can do a double-take without moving his head." Further criticism came from Colm Andrew of the Manx Independent who said that "Marley himself is surprisingly one-dimensional" and the ending was overemotional, going "for the heart-wrenching kind which will always provoke a response, but does so with absolutely no grace".

== Accolades ==
Year	Award	Category	Recipients & Nominees	Result
2009	BMI Film & TV Awards	BMI Film Music Award	Theodore Shapiro	Won
2009	Kids' Choice Awards	Favorite Movie Actress	Jennifer Aniston	Nominated
2009	Teen Choice Award	Choice Movie: Bromantic Comedy	Marley & Me	Won
2009	Teen Choice Award	Choice Movie Actress: Comedy	Jennifer Aniston	Nominated
2009	Teen Choice Award	Choice Movie Liplock	Owen Wilson & Marley	Nominated

== Home media ==
20th Century Fox Home Entertainment released the film on DVD and Blu-ray Disc on March 31, 2009. Viewers have the option of a single disc or a two-disc set called the Bad Dog Edition. The film is in anamorphic widescreen format with audio tracks in English, French, and Spanish and subtitles in English and Spanish. Bonus features on the two-disc set include Finding Marley, Breaking the Golden Rule, On Set with Marley: Dog of All Trades, Animal Adoption, When Not to Pee, How Many Takes, a gag reel, and the Purina Dog Chow Video Hall of Fame and Marley & Me video contest finalists. The DVD has sold a total of 3,514,154 copies generating $61.41 million in sales revenue.

A prequel to the film, Marley & Me: The Puppy Years, was released direct-to-video on June 1, 2011.

== Soundtrack ==
Marley & Me OST

Soundtrack album by Theodore Shapiro
- Released: December 16, 2008
- Genre: Score
- Length: 39:48
- Label: Lakeshore Records

Theodore Shapiro chronology
"Tropic Thunder" (2008)	Marley & Me OST (2008)	"I Love You Man" (2009)

All tracks are written by Theodore Shapiro.

No.	Title	Length
1.	"Parents of Two"	1:49
2.	"Off and Running"	0:51
3.	"The Hardest Job"	1:33
4.	"Walking the Plank"	1:30
5.	"Obedience School"	1:19
6.	"Leg Love"	1:05
7.	"Two Year Montage"	3:23
8.	"Moving to Boca"	1:53
9.	"First Sleepless Night"	2:05
10.	"When It's Time"	1:10
11.	"Off to Ireland"	1:53
12.	"Dog Farm"	1:19
13.	"Boy and Dog"	1:19
14.	"Lost in the Rain"	0:43
15.	"Employed"	1:07
16.	"All Good Dogs"	0:55
17.	"Evil With a Dog Face"	0:45
18.	"Labor Pains"	1:18
19.	"No Regular Dog"	1:27
20.	"Snow"	1:03
21.	"Jen Says Goodbye"	1:50
22.	"It All Runs Together"	4:03
23.	"Heading Home"	2:15
24.	"Marley & Me"	3:32
Total length:		39:48

=== Additional music of Marley & Me ===
No.	Title	Music	Length
1.	"Shiny Happy People"	R.E.M.
2.	"One Love"	Bob Marley
3.	"Deception"	Tech-i-L.A.
4.	"Rockin' the Suburbs (Over the Hedge Version)"	Ben Folds
5.	"Only Wanna Be With You"	Hootie and the Blowfish
6.	"Cantaloop (Flip Fantasia)"	Us3
7.	"Lithium"	Bruce Lash
8.	"Rather Be"	The Verve
9.	"Lucky Man"	The Verve
10.	"River Song"	Dennis Wilson
