= Richard Staples Dodge =

American illustrator

Dick Dodge
- Born: Richard Staples Dodge; January 18, 1918; Sacramento, California, U.S.
- Died: May 24, 1974 (aged 56); New York City, New York, U.S.
- Education: Art Center School (1937), Chouinard School (1938), Mills College (1939), Art Academy of Cincinnati (1939–1943)
- Known for: Painting, commercial art, illustration, children's literature, drawing, watercolor, sculpture

Richard Staples (Dick) Dodge (January 18, 1918 – May 24, 1974) was an American illustrator.

== Early life ==
Born in Sacramento, California in 1918, Dick Dodge attended several colleges on scholarship, including the Art Center School, Chouinard School, and Mills College Summer Session where he studied with Lionel Feininger and Frederick Taubes. He transferred to Cincinnati Art Academy beginning October 1939, attending on an out-of-town full scholarship from the Arts Students League.

Dodge enlisted in the US Air Corps on October 27, 1942, serving at Patterson Air Field in Hamilton, Ohio for about 4 months before being honorably discharged due to health issues.

== Career ==
Following his service, Dodge resumed studies at Cincinnati Art Academy in the 1943 school year. In August 1943 he accepted a position at Columbia Records in Bridgeport, Connecticut, where his friend James Flora had recently been hired by Alex Steinweiss. Recalling those early years at Columbia Records, Ginnie Hofmann recalled Flora saying, "Everything will be fine. Dick Dodge is here." According to several contemporary sources, Dodge was hired as Art Director when Flora was promoted to advertising executive. But he never served in that role (or served only briefly), as Robert M. Jones became Art Director after Flora.

Using his connections with Flora and Jones, who both later worked for RCA Victor (Jones as Art Director), Dodge contributed to the album (LP) catalog of both labels producing artwork for the covers and sleeves of material ranging from children's stories to popular song to classical music – for example, the original cast recording cover for Paint Your Wagon.

Dodge's commercial work also included periodicals, children's books, and dust jackets for dozens of titles published by Random House, Simon & Schuster, Harcourt Brace, and MacMillan. Notable examples of his children's book illustrations include Too Many Sisters and The First Book of Boys Cooking, both authored by Jerrold Beim. He illustrated several of the covers for P.G. Wodehouse books published by Simon & Schuster as well as Zorba the Greek by Nikos Kazantzakis.

Between 1954 and 1958, Dodge contributed illustrations to Ford Times magazine, including the cover illustration of the December 1955 edition (Vol. 47, No. 12), titled "Christmas Tree Highway".

Throughout his life, Dodge created artwork in many media and styles, with influences ranging from Regionalism to Abstract Expressionism. Dodge was an active member of the American Watercolor Society from 1956 until his death. According to his New York Times obituary, he was a charter member of the Artist Guild of Westport, Connecticut as well as being a member of the Illustrators Society of New York.

== Selected Bibliography (Illustrator) ==
- 1953 – Zorba the Greek
- 1954 – The Return of Jeeves
- 1955 – Bertie Wooster Sees It Through
- 1956 – The Butler Did It
- 1956 – Too Many Sisters
- 1957 – The First Book of Boys Cooking
- 1971 – Jeeves and the Tie That Binds
