= ÜberFacts =

Online web service/app

- Website type: Online database for facts
- Available in: English
- Owner: Kris Sanchez
- Creator: Kris Sanchez
- Commercial: Yes
- Launched: 2009; 17 years ago
- Current status: Active

ÜberFacts is an online web service/app that provides users with random facts. There is currently a Twitter version, a mobile app version, an Instagram version, and a Facebook version. The service was developed by Kris Sanchez. Sanchez receives the facts through research from books, science articles, the news, and more. He stated that he always confirms the accuracy of the facts prior to releasing them. Mistakes are eventually deleted or updated with corrections.

== History ==
ÜberFacts creator Kris Sanchez reported searching for "interesting" facts during a "boring" day in September 2009. This prompted Kris to create the ÜberFacts Twitter account.

=== Twitter hacked ===
On May 21, 2014, the UberFacts Twitter account was hacked; the hacker sent out vulgar messages. Sanchez noticed this and tweeted on his personal account that the hacker will have to pay him for every tweet owed. On the next day, Sanchez recovered UberFacts, and announced that his account was hacked and apologized for the vulgar messages the hacker sent out.

== Reception ==
A March 2014 BuzzFeed article panned UberFacts for its occasionally incorrect facts. BuzzFeed then sent an email to Sanchez inquiring if the facts provided are incorrect; he responded saying that the accuracy of his facts is reviewed prior to releasing them and he does not cite sources because not everyone would want to see a link at the end of a tweet.

Sanchez stated that he earns approximately US$500,000 per year through Uberfacts, and expects that number to increase in the future due to the release of a dedicated app.
