= Salvijus Bercys =

Lithuanian-American chess player (born 1989)

Personal information
- Born: September 8, 1989 (age 36) Vilnius, Lithuania

Chess career
- Country: Lithuania (until 2003); United States (since 2003)
- Title: International Master (2007)
- FIDE rating: 2447 (July 2026)
- Peak rating: 2487 (July 2011)

Salvijus "Sal" Bercys (born September 8, 1989) is an American International Master. His peak USCF rating is 2512. He is a major figure in Michael Weinreb's book The Kings of New York and was part of the "dream team" from the Edward R. Murrow school, along with Alex Lenderman (now a grandmaster).
