= Joy of Cooking =

1931 book by Irma S. Rombauer

- Cover of 1975 edition
- Author: Irma S. Rombauer
- Genre: Cookbook
- Publisher: Bobbs-Merrill, Scribner
- Publication date: 1931
- ISBN: 0-02-604570-2
- OCLC: 1444322

Joy of Cooking, often known as "The Joy of Cooking", is one of the United States' most-published cookbooks. It has been in print continuously since 1936 and has sold more than 20 million copies. It was published privately during 1931 by Irma S. Rombauer (1877–1962), a homemaker in St. Louis, Missouri, after her husband's suicide the previous year. Rombauer had 3,000 copies printed by A.C. Clayton, a company that had printed labels for fancy St. Louis shoe companies and for Listerine mouthwash, but never a book. Beginning in 1936, the book was published by a commercial printing house, the Bobbs-Merrill Company. The cookbook has gone through nine major editions, the most recent published in 2019.

== Background ==
Born to German immigrants in 1877, Irma Starkloff was born and grew up in St. Louis, Missouri. She married Edgar Rombauer, a lawyer, in 1899. Edgar committed suicide in 1930 after a severe bout of depression, widowing Irma at age 52 and leaving her with $6,000 in savings.

Rombauer's children, Marion Rombauer Becker and Edgar Roderick ("Put") Rombauer, Jr., encouraged her to compile her recipes and thoughts on cooking to help her cope with her loss. Rombauer spent much of the summer of 1930 in Michigan, creating the first drafts that would later become Joy of Cooking. With the help of her late husband's secretary, Mazie Whyte, Rombauer began writing and editing recipes and commentaries while searching for more recipes in St. Louis. During the autumn of 1930, Rombauer went to the A.C. Clayton Printing Company, a printer for the St. Louis shoe manufacturers. She paid them $3,000 to print 3,000 copies of The Joy of Cooking: A Compilation of Reliable Recipes with a Casual Culinary Chat in November 1931.

== Editions ==
=== First edition (1931) ===
In 1931 Rombauer self-published The Joy of Cooking: A Compilation of Reliable Recipes with a Casual Culinary Chat with more than 500 tested recipes and related commentaries.

The book was illustrated by Rombauer's daughter, Marion Rombauer Becker, who directed the art department at John Burroughs School. Working weekends during the winter of 1930–31, Marion designed the cover, which depicted Saint Martha of Bethany, the patron saint of cooking, subduing a tarasque. She also produced silhouette cutouts to illustrate chapter headings. By 1932, a majority of the 3,000 copies printed by A.C. Clayton were sold. Rombauer began to look for a publisher in 1932.

=== Second edition (1936) ===
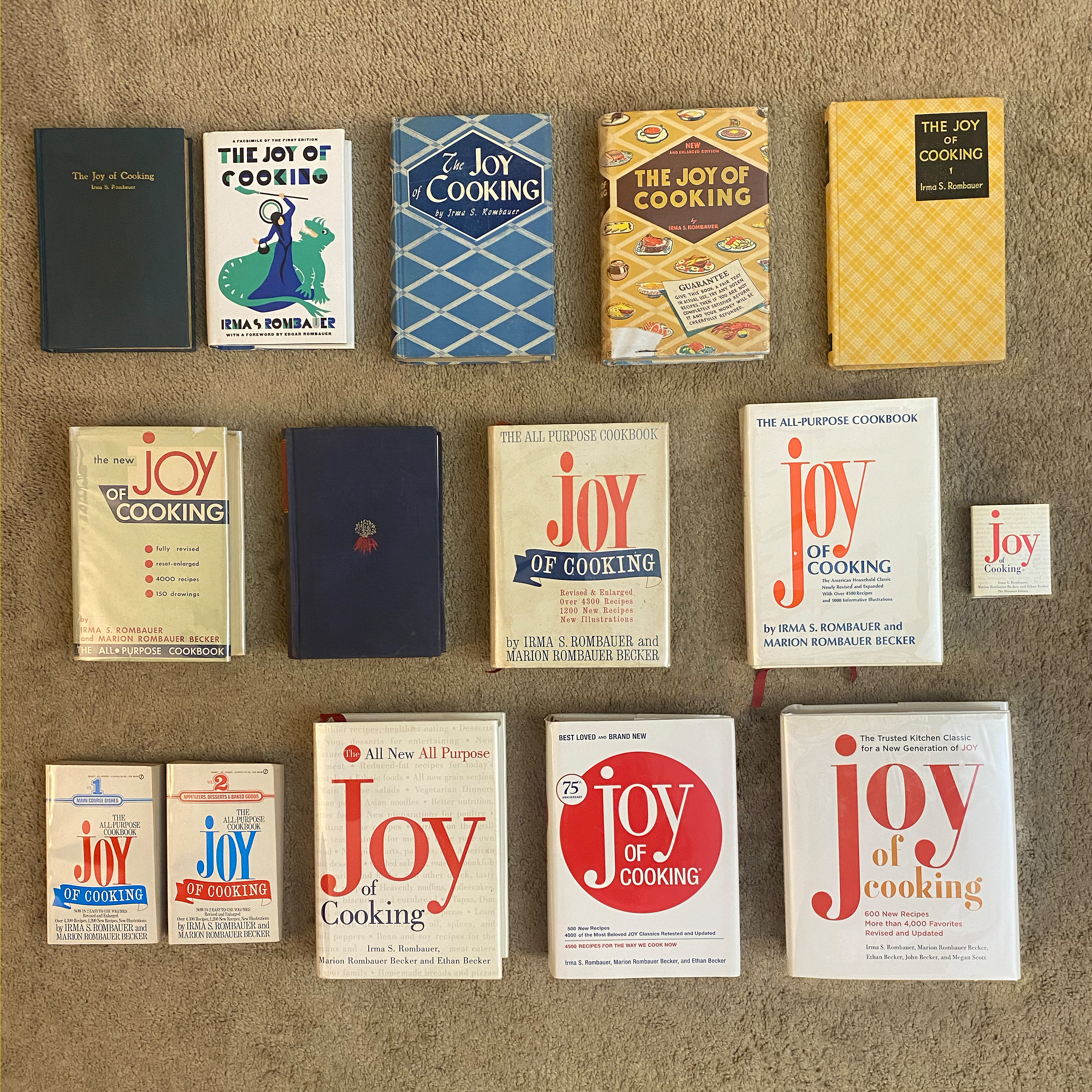
Editions of (The) Joy of Cooking, from the 1st printing in 1931 (top left) to the most recent edition, published in 2019

After Rombauer had searched for a publisher and been rejected many times, the Bobbs-Merrill Company published an expanded (640 page) second edition on May 1, 1936. The company had limited experience with publishing cookbooks, and Rombauer, similarly inexperienced in dealing with publishers, performed the negotiations herself without an agent or lawyer. The resulting contract, in which Bobbs-Merrill was granted the copyright not only for the 1936 edition but also for the original 1931 version, resulted in many years of conflict between the author and the publisher.

The 1936 edition differed from other commercial cookbooks of the era by its retention of the author's folksy comments and anecdotes, and its layout of the recipes. Instead of listing the ingredients for a dish at the top with preparation directions following, the recipes in Joy (1936) were presented by narratives, with the ingredients indicated as the need for them occurred, with each placed in boldface on a new indented line — thus preserving a conversational style throughout the recipe. This method came to be known as the "action method". These innovations, along with an aggressive marketing effort by Bobbs-Merrill, resulted in good sales. Joy reached the best-seller list in St. Louis and promoted as "the famous private cookbook" in the New York Times. By the end of 1942, the second edition had had six printings, and 52,151 copies had been sold.

=== Third edition (1943/1946) ===
In 1939, Rombauer published Streamlined Cooking, a collection of recipes that could be prepared in less than 30 minutes, with an emphasis on use of canned and frozen foods. This book was not a commercial success, but many of the recipes it contained became part of a new edition of Joy of Cooking published during 1943. This edition also included material intended to help readers deal with wartime rationing restrictions, including alternatives to butter in some recipes. Sales of this edition were phenomenal: from 1943 through 1946 a total of 617,782 copies were sold, surpassing sales of Joy of Cooking's principal competitor, Fannie Farmer's Boston Cooking-School Cook Book.

During 1946, a minor revision of the 1943 edition was published. While substantially the same as its predecessor, the 1946 revision omitted the material related to wartime rationing and incorporated additional recipes from Streamlined Cooking.

=== Fourth edition (1951) ===
Irma Rombauer was 69 years old when the 1946 edition of Joy was published, and her health was beginning to decline. She was concerned about the future of her book, since Bobbs-Merrill (which owned the copyright for the original publication) might have selected an author of their own choosing for future editions once Rombauer was unable to continue. To ensure that the book remained a family project, Rombauer negotiated with the publisher a clause in her contract naming her daughter, Marion Rombauer Becker, as her sole successor in any future revision.

Relations between Rombauer and Bobbs-Merrill, never cordial, worsened during the late 1940s, and in the fracas Marion Becker gradually assumed increasing responsibility, at first regarding the book's design, and eventually its content. Partly for legal reasons, the 1951 edition was published with Marion Rombauer Becker listed as co-author, and she received 40% of the royalties. The authors strongly resisted the publisher's wish to illustrate the book with photographs and instead embellished the book with simple, functional line drawings by Ginnie Hofmann, a friend of Becker's.

Becker was a passionate advocate of healthy eating, and the 1951 edition was marked by an increased emphasis of such topics as whole grains and fresh produce. Many of the old "can-opener" recipes from Streamlined Cooking were eliminated. This edition also was the first to introduce the use of the blender and other modern household items into its recipes. The number of recipes had increased to more than 4,000.

Because of the time taken by the protracted legal arguments, final editing of the 1951 edition was done hastily. The same edition was reprinted in 1952 with some errors corrected, and again during 1953 with a revised index.

=== Fifth edition (1962/1963/1964) ===
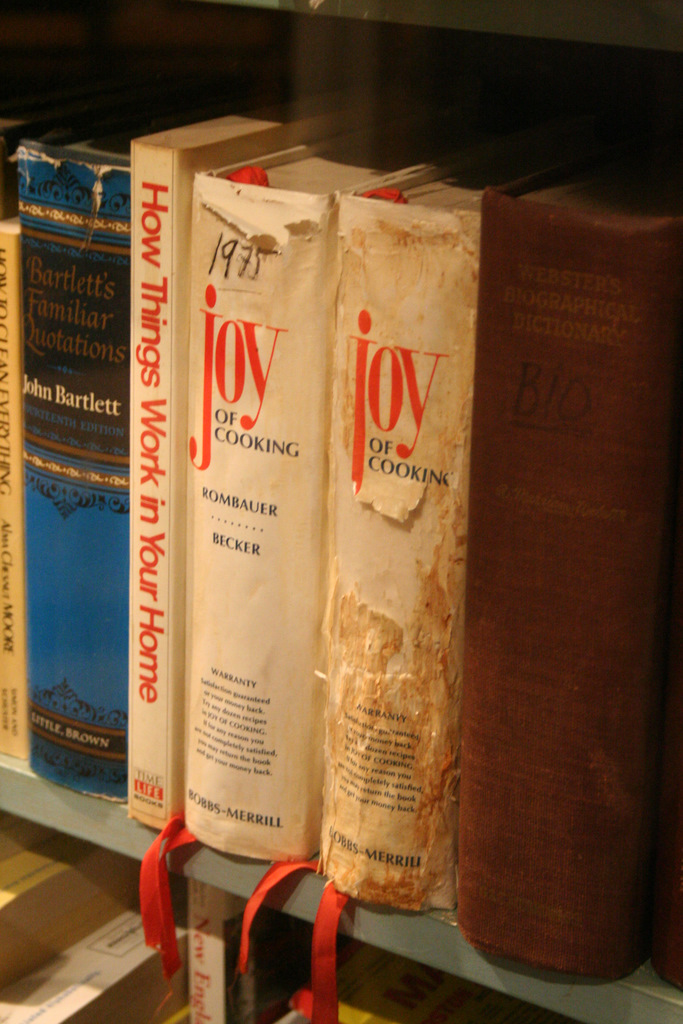
Well-worn copies of the book from the library of Julia Child on display at the National Museum of American History

In 1962, the year of Irma Rombauer's death, a revised edition of Joy of Cooking was published. This edition was released without Marion Becker's consent. Subsequent releases of the book during 1963 and 1964 were essentially massive corrections, and Becker arranged for the publisher to exchange copies of the 1962 edition for later corrected versions upon request.

The foreword of the 1962 edition explains that Becker's favorite recipes include "Cockaigne" in the name, (e.g., "Fruit Cake Cockaigne"), after the name of her country home in Anderson Township, near Cincinnati.

This edition was also published in paperback format (most notably, a two-volume mass market paperback edition); it is still widely available in used bookstores. The 1962 edition was also released as a single-volume comb-ring bound paperback mass-market edition starting in November 1973 and continuing into the early 1990s.

=== Sixth edition (1975) ===
The 1975 edition was the last to be edited by Becker and remains the most popular, with more than 6 million copies sold. More than 1,000 pages long, and with over 4,300 recipes, it became a standard in kitchens throughout the country. The book included sections concerning backpacking, hiking, and substitutions, and though many sections may seem antiquated to contemporary fashion, many home cooks still use it.

=== Seventh edition (1997) ===
After the 1975 edition, the project was unchanged for about 20 years. During the mid-1990s, publisher Simon & Schuster, which owns the Joy of Cooking's copyrights (gained from its acquisition of Macmillan Inc. which had previously acquired Bobbs-Merrill catalog)., hired cookbook editor Maria Guarnaschelli, formerly of William Morrow, and editor of works by Jeff Smith and others. Guarnaschelli, supervised by Rombauer's grandson Ethan Becker, managed the creation of the 1997 edition, published by Simon & Schuster's Charles Scribner's Sons division. The new edition kept the concise style of its predecessors, but it eliminated the conversational first-person narration. Much of the edition was ghostwritten by teams of expert chefs instead of the single dedicated amateur Irma Rombauer had been when she created the book. The 1997 version is fairly comprehensive; however, it no longer contains much information about ingredients or frozen desserts.

Upon its publication during January 1997, the edition was titled The All-New, All-Purpose Joy of Cooking; during November of that same year, it was reissued with the title The 1997 Joy of Cooking.

=== Other special editions and printings ===
In 1995, a hardbound edition illustrated by Ginnie Hofmann and Ikki Matsumoto was released.

In 1998, a reproduction, described as "A Facsimile of the First Edition", was released.

=== Eighth edition (2006): 75th anniversary edition ===
In 2006, Scribner published a 75th anniversary edition, containing 4,500 recipes, that reproduced much of Rombauer's original style. The new version removes some of the professionalism of the 1997 edition and returns many simpler recipes and recipes assisted by ready-made products such as cream of mushroom soup and store-bought wontons. The 2006 edition also reinstates the cocktail section and the frozen desserts section, and restores much of the information that was omitted for the 1997 edition.

The new version includes a new index section named "Joy Classics" that contains 35 recipes from 1931 to 1975 and a new nutrition section. It was still edited and written by the Rombauer-Becker family.

=== Ninth edition (2019) ===
600 new recipes were added to this edition. Irma's great grandson, John Becker, and his wife Megan Scott, were responsible for the updates.

== Reception ==
Joy of Cooking became popular among middle-American households in the twentieth century. The cookbook used a conversational writing style and has recipes catered to home cooking. The recipes were designed specifically for middle-class people doing most of their own cooking for their family. Rombauer specifically tested and practiced the recipes to ensure they could be produced easily in a relatively brief period of time without much complication. She combined conversational commentary with the actions of cooking, incorporating ingredients into the instructions instead of listing them separately. Moreover, Rombauer paired the conversational style of the recipes with casual discussions of etiquette and hosting. Her methods were distinct from the other cookbooks of the time, which featured many complex recipes, while her style was simple and conversational. By providing an interesting and easy to read cookbook for the middle class, Joy of Cooking became a widely used reference book for mid-century American cooks.

== Legacy ==
Julia Child learned to cook from The Joy of Cooking and Gourmet magazine. She enjoyed "Mrs. Joy's Book" and believed it taught her the basic principles of cooking.

The book popularized the title formula "The Joy of..." used to indicate an accessible, popular overview of a topic, such as The Joy of Painting (1983), The Joy of Sex (1972), The Joy of Art (2020), The Joy of X: A Guided Tour of Mathematics (2012), The Joy of Living (2007), The Joy of Accounting (2020), and even The Joy of Uncircumcising (1992).

== See also ==
- Books in the United States
