= Max Starkloff =

American disability rights activist (1937 – 2010)

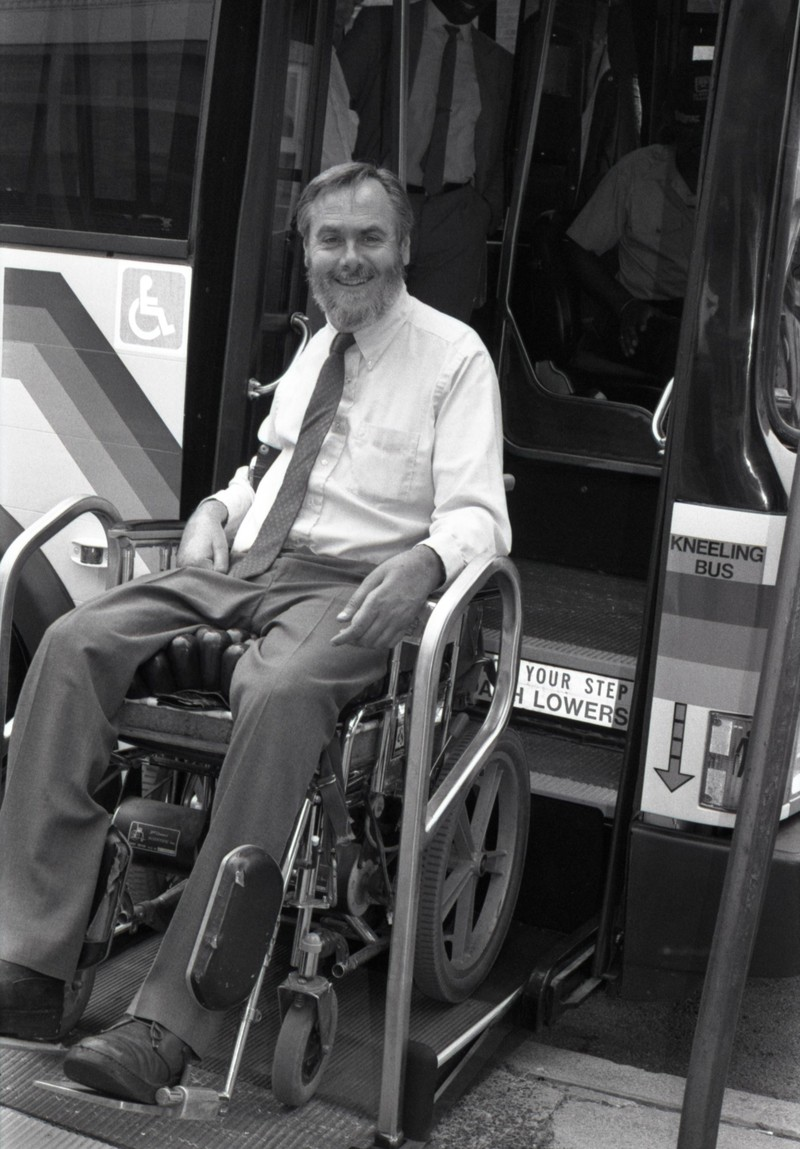
Max Starkloff using a bus lift

Max Starkloff (September 18, 1937, St. Louis, Missouri – December, 2010) was a disability rights activist. Starkloff became disabled in a car accident in 1959 and subsequently co-founded three organizations.

== Personal life ==
In 1959, at the age of 21, Starkloff was involved in a car accident and became a quadriplegic with limited use of his left arm. After the crash, his mother was told he would only live for four more days; however, he survived and was inspired to fight for disability rights. From the ages of 26 to 38, he lived at St. Joseph's Hill infirmary, a nursing home in St. Louis. He married Colleen Kelly, a physical therapist at his nursing home, in 1975, and the couple adopted three children. In 2007, he fell off of his wheelchair and punctured a lung, forcing him to use a ventilator for the remainder of his life. He died from influenza complications on December 27, 2010.

== Disability rights ==
Starkloff was passionate about disability rights and was one of the leaders of the "independent living movement," a grassroots movement meant to inspire young people with disabilities to take control of their own care. The Max Starkloff Lifetime Achievement Award from the National Council on Independent Living was named after him. In 1970, while living in a nursing home, Starkloff founded Paraquad. The goal of the company was to help people with disabilities live independently. One year later, in 1971, he began the St. Louis chapter of the National Paraplegia Foundation. He continued to fight for disability rights and was able to convince St. Louis officials to install curb cuts on the sidewalks of the city. He would often say: "I'm not 'confined' to a wheelchair. I'm confined to what society tells me I'm confined to." In 1983, he co-founded the American National Council on Independent Living (NCIL) with Marca Bristo and Charlie Carr. He fought for the passage of the Americans with Disabilities Act, which passed in 1990. Starkloff sought to make the world more accessible for the disabled; in addition to the city sidewalks, he was also involved in making the St. Louis Zoo create accessible facilities. In 2003, he and his wife Colleen began the Starkloff Disability Institute in downtown St. Louis, which sought to work with employers in hiring disabled people. He won a President's Distinguished Service Award in 1991, and was awarded a star on the St. Louis Walk of Fame.

He co-founded three organizations:

- Paraquad, an independent living center, in 1970, then one of the first ten such federally funded centers;
- National Council on Independent Living, in 1983 (with Marca Bristo and Charlie Carr);
- Starkloff Disability Institute, co-founded with Colleen, his wife, in 2003.
