= Charlie Carr (activist) =

American disability rights activist

Charlie Carr (born 1953 in Everett, Massachusetts) is a disability rights activist who became disabled after a diving accident in 1968. He was institutionalized for seven years and then left Middlesex County Hospital in Waltham, MA upon the creation of the Boston Center for Independent Living in 1974. He was an early member and went on to start:

- The Northeast Independent Living Program in Lawrence, MA in 1980 as the founder and CEO
- The National Council on Independent Living in 1983
- The Disability Policy Consortium in Massachusetts in 1996

He was appointed Commissioner of the Massachusetts Rehabilitation Commission in 2007 by Gov. Deval Patrick, and served for eight years.
