= Irma S. Rombauer =

American cookbook author (1877–1962)

- Born: Irma von Starkloff; October 30, 1877; St. Louis, Missouri, US
- Died: October 14, 1962 (aged 84); St. Louis, Missouri, US
- Resting place: Bellefontaine Cemetery
- Other names: Irma Starkloff, Irma Starkloff Rombauer
- Education: Washington University in St. Louis
- Occupation: Cookbook author
- Known for: The Joy of Cooking
- Spouse: Edgar Roderich Rombauer
- Children: 3

Irma Rombauer (née von Starkloff, October 30, 1877 – October 14, 1962) was an American cookbook author, best known for The Joy of Cooking (1931), one of the world's most widely read cookbooks. Following Irma Rombauer's death, periodic revisions of the book were carried out by her daughter, Marion Rombauer Becker, and subsequently by Marion's son Ethan Becker. The Joy of Cooking remains in print, edited by members of the Rombauer–Becker family, and more than 18 million copies have been sold.

== Early life ==
Irma von Starkloff was born on October 30, 1877, in St. Louis, Missouri, the younger of two daughters born to Dr. Hugo von Starkloff, a German-born physician, and his second wife, Emma Kuhlmann von Starkloff, a teacher who also hailed from Germany. (Note: The family sometimes used the name Starkloff and sometimes von Starkloff; the "von" was a relatively late addition to the name.) Her half-brother was Max C. Starkloff, the St. Louis Health Commissioner who introduced social distancing during the 1918 flu pandemic.

Irma's father was active in civic and political affairs; between 1889 and 1894 he served as the United States Consul in Bremen, and during his tenure Irma received some informal education there and in Lausanne, Switzerland. Upon returning to the United States, she took classes in fine arts at Washington University in St. Louis in 1897. She frequently traveled to visit relatives in Indianapolis, where she met and was briefly courted by the young Booth Tarkington. The family opposed the match, however, and in 1899 Irma married Edgar Rombauer, a lawyer whose father was a St. Louis judge who had clerked for Supreme Court Justice John Harlan. The couple's first child, Roland, was born in 1900 but died before his first birthday. The two children who followed lived to adulthood: Marion was born in 1903, and Edgar Jr. (known as "Put") was born in 1907.

During the first 30 years of her marriage, Irma Rombauer busied herself with the activities of civic and cultural organizations, and she took pleasure in entertaining, from simple luncheons for members of the women's associations to which she belonged to more formal dinners for civic leaders and political associates of her husband, who became Speaker of the St. Louis House of Delegates. She possessed a sparkling personality that served her well as a hostess. Her biographer wrote, "No one could be long in her diminutive presence without sensing an air of concentrated intelligence, strength, self-possession, charm, and dignity that seemed to sweep all before it—except that she knew how to soften it with disarming feminine self-deprecation and sheer fun." As a cook, she was competent, but not extraordinary, although she showed considerable skill at making and decorating cakes. Her daughter Marion described her priorities:

Mother's early housekeeping days...gave little evidence of culinary prowess... Indeed, it is an open secret that Mother, to the very end of her life, regarded social intercourse as more important than food. The dinner table, in our childhood, frequently suggested a lectern rather than a buffet. What I remember better than the dishes it upheld—which, I must admit, constantly improved in quality—was the talk which went 'round it, talk which burst forth out of our richly multiple interests.

Through much of his adult life, Edgar Rombauer suffered periodic bouts of severe depression. He experienced one of these attacks in the winter of 1929-30 and had seemed to be recovering, but on February 3, 1930, he committed suicide, leaving his wife emotionally shattered and in dire financial straits. The Great Depression had been triggered by the stock market crash just three months earlier, Irma was 52 years old, had no job, and had savings amounting only to $6,000, equivalent to $115,637 in 2025. Her son Put had moved to Florida, and Marion was planning to be married and would soon leave home. It was clear that Irma would need to find something to occupy her mind and provide an income. Her solution was characteristically impulsive and bold. To the bewilderment of many who knew her, she announced that she was going to write a cookbook.

== Joy of Cooking ==
The earliest origins of the material in Joy of Cooking are unclear. Marion considered that it evolved from a collection of recipes supposedly used by her mother as part of a cooking course for the First Unitarian Women's Alliance but later research raises questions about Marion's recollection, with no indication that the mimeographs of the Women's Alliance recipes pre-dated the first edition of Joy. It is certain that Rombauer solicited from numerous friends and family members many of the recipes that she assembled under the title The Joy of Cooking: A Compilation of Reliable Recipes, with a Casual Culinary Chat. Marion designed a cover and provided silhouette chapter headings, and 3000 copies of the book were printed by the A. C. Clayton Company, a commercial printer of labels and packaging materials that had never before printed a book. The St. Louis Post Dispatch covered the book's 1931 launch with an enthusiastic feature article in which the reviewer remarked, "It does not insult my intelligence." With help from Marion, Rombauer sold copies personally and had copies placed in bookstores and gift shops throughout St. Louis and as far away as Michigan and Chicago, (Note: Marion reported that Irma had journeyed to Chicago to enlist the help of bookseller Adolf Kroch, but there is other evidence suggesting that Kroch had learned of the book independently and approached Rombauer on his own.) and by the summer of 1932 roughly two-thirds of the original print run of 3000 copies had been sold.

It was the "casual culinary chat" that provided the book's major selling point. Rombauer added to the basic recipes bits of humor, friendly advice and homely anecdotes, projecting into the pages the same effervescent personality that had made her so successful as a hostess. A later cookbook author, Molly Finn, summed it up in these words:

The best thing about The Joy of Cooking, however, is the voice of its author, Irma Rombauer. She engages in a constant dialogue with her readers, telling stories about herself and her family, sprinkling the text with genuine witticisms and excruciatingly corny puns, and making sure everybody knows that cooking is not an occult science or esoteric art, but part of the everyday work of the vast majority of women (and a few men) that can be turned into fun with her help.

The success of the initial Joy encouraged Rombauer to seek an established publisher for an expanded edition. For several years her inquiries brought only rejection letters; but in 1935 her manuscript was accepted (on the third submission) by the Bobbs-Merrill Company, an Indianapolis-based firm specializing in legal publications, children's literature, and trade books. They had limited experience with cookbooks, and Rombauer knew nothing about dealing with publishers. She represented herself in the negotiations, without help from an agent or a lawyer, and the resulting contract was highly prejudicial to her interests, planting the seeds for an author-publisher relationship that brought misery and rage to both sides, up to and beyond the end of Rombauer's life. (Note: The details of the acrimonious relationship are thoroughly explored in Anne Mendelson's Stand Facing the Stove. Much of the trouble arose from the fact that the original contract assigned to Bobbs-Merrill the copyright, not only for the second edition which they published, but also for the original edition which Rombauer had self-published. This effectively precluded Rombauer from any possibility of ever taking the book to a different publisher, however great might be the differences between her and Bobbs-Merrill.) However, Bobbs-Merrill mounted a vigorous sales campaign on behalf of Joy, and the 1936 edition sold 6,838 copies within six months, on its way to an edition total of 52,151.

The 1936 edition retained the author's anecdotes and witty comments (at Rombauer's insistence, despite Bobbs-Merrill's desire to cut them), and it added a new selling point in the format of its recipes. Traditionally recipes begin with a list of ingredients, after which come the preparation instructions. The 1936 Joy pioneered a different layout, in which the directions unfolded as a narrative, with ingredients being listed (indented and in boldface type) as the need for them arose. This "action format" reinforced the chatty "Irmaisms" to suggest that the recipes were really just conversations between the author and the book's user.

In 1939, Rombauer published Streamlined Cooking, featuring dishes that could be created in less than 30 minutes. The target audience included working women, students, vacationers, and campers, and, indeed, men pressed into a domestic version of KP duty. For this population, speed and ease of preparation overrode other considerations, and the book's recipes made generous use of canned, packaged, and frozen ingredients. While the book was not a commercial success, a number of its recipes found their way into the phenomenally successful 1943 edition of Joy.

The 1943 edition boasted no innovation as revolutionary as the "action method" format introduced in 1936, but in addition to the recipes from Streamlined it included material on "herbs, nutritional tallies for common foods, cooking terms, table settings, and the serving of wines" and provided suggestions for dealing with wartime rationing, including alternatives to butter in some recipes. Also, the book's friendly, reassuring tone provided a form of relief to readers buffeted by "the hot and cold conflicts which raged outside its cozy covers...especially the 'War Bride'". The resulting edition, aggressively marketed by Bobbs-Merrill, became a national bestseller. Between 1943 and 1946, Joy sold 617,782 copies, far surpassing sales of its principal rival, Fannie Farmer's Boston Cooking-School Cook Book. A 1946 reprint of the same edition deleted the material on rationing (substituting more recipes from Streamlined) but was otherwise nearly identical. Also appearing in 1946 was an entirely new title: a children's cookbook written by Irma called A Cookbook for Girls and Boys.

By the mid-1940s Rombauer had become a national celebrity, a status in which she delighted. She also had more than enough income, and was able to provide some financial assistance to her children, and to pay more generously Mazie Whyte Hartrich, the secretary who had faithfully typed all of her manuscripts. But by the time the 1946 edition was printed, Rombauer was nearing 70, and her health was beginning to decline. A series of family crises and tragedies compounded the perpetual warfare with Bobbs-Merrill to leave Rombauer feeling weakened and concerned about the future of Joy. Deciding that she would need a collaborator for the next edition, and hoping that the book would remain a family project, she asked her daughter Marion to help her with the next version of the text, (Note: Irma had initially intended her collaborator to be a friend named Jane Torno, who had assisted with A Cookbook for Girls and Boys and with some published articles. However, Mrs. Torno developed serious health problems, and Irma turned to Marion instead.) and she negotiated a clause in her contract with Bobbs-Merrill specifying that Marion was to have sole authority to complete future revisions of Joy in the event of Rombauer's disability or death.

Rombauer's daughter Marion initially worked primarily on the artistic design of the upcoming revision, but by 1949 she had become deeply involved in the negotiations with Bobbs-Merrill. She had no better luck dealing with the publisher than had her mother, and as author-publisher relations sank to a new low (involving legal threats), Marion assumed responsibility as co-author. The revised edition appeared in 1951 (with subsequent printings in 1952 and 1953 correcting errors and improving the index). It was both a critical and commercial success: in 1952 alone 201,394 copies were sold.

Following the publication of the 1951 edition of Joy, Rombauer was able to enjoy her status as "one of the eternal verities of American cooking". She and her daughter made frequent trips to New York where they were welcomed by a circle which included food writers Cecily Brownstone and Jane Nickerson, and chefs James Beard, Marian Tracy, and Helmut Rippenger. Rombauer undertook a tour of Europe with Mark Becker, her grandson, during which she met Julia Child, a faithful fan of Joy.

Although Rombauer suffered some digestive disorders and tired easily, her health at this time was good for a woman now in her mid-seventies. Rombauer had started work on a history of her life when she suffered a stroke on May 26, 1955. While she quickly regained most of her physical and mental abilities, it was followed the next year by a more severe stroke, which caused progressive physical degeneration, and also resulted in extreme irritability, causing her to periodically lash out at those with whom she interacted, particularly Marion (who was herself recovering from a mastectomy). Rombauer's health continued to deteriorate during the next few years. By 1962 she was suffering a series of seizures, her left leg had become paralyzed and eventually had to be amputated.

== Personal life ==
On October 14, 1899, Rombauer married Edgar Roderich Rombauer. They had three children, Roland Rombauer (1900–1901), Marion J. Rombauer (1903–1976) and Edgar H. Rombauer Jr (1907-1999).

On October 14, 1962, Rombauer died in St. Louis, Missouri. She was 84 years old. Rombauer was cremated and her ashes were buried at Bellefontaine Cemetery in St. Louis, Missouri.

== Recognitions and honors ==
On February 23, 1956, Rombauer received a Founder's Day Award from Washington University, where she had attended classes in 1897, although she did not complete a degree program.

In 1998, Rombauer was inducted into the St. Louis Walk of Fame.

Rombauer was portrayed by Frances Sternhagen in the 2009 film Julie & Julia.
