= Gregg v. Georgia =

1976 U.S. Supreme Court case upholding the death penalty

- Supreme Court of the United States

Argued March 30–31, 1976 Decided July 2, 1976
- Full case name: Troy Leon Gregg v. State of Georgia; Charles William Proffitt v. State of Florida; Jerry Lane Jurek v. State of Texas; James Tyrone Woodson, et al. v. State of North Carolina; Roberts, et al. v. Louisiana
- Citations: 428 U.S. 153 (more) 96 S. Ct. 2909; 49 L. Ed. 2d 859; 1976 U.S. LEXIS 82

Case history
- Prior: Certiorari to the Supreme Courts of Georgia, Florida, North Carolina, and Louisiana, and the Court of Criminal Appeals of Texas

Holding
- The imposition of the death penalty does not, automatically, violate the Eighth and Fourteenth Amendment. If the jury is furnished with standards to direct and limit the sentencing discretion, and the jury's decision is subjected to meaningful appellate review, the death sentence may be constitutional. If, however, the death penalty is mandatory, such that there is no provision for mercy based on the characteristics of the offender, then it is unconstitutional.

Court membership
- Chief Justice Warren E. Burger Associate Justices William J. Brennan Jr. · Potter Stewart; Byron White · Thurgood Marshall; Harry Blackmun · Lewis F. Powell Jr. William Rehnquist · John P. Stevens

Case opinions
- Plurality: Stewart, Powell, Stevens
- Concurrence: White (in judgment), joined by Burger, Rehnquist
- Concurrence: Burger, Rehnquist (in judgment)
- Concurrence: Blackmun (in judgment)
- Dissent: Brennan
- Dissent: Marshall

Laws applied
- U.S. Const. amends. VIII, XIV

Gregg v. Georgia, Proffitt v. Florida, Jurek v. Texas, Woodson v. North Carolina, and Roberts v. Louisiana, 428 U.S. 153 (1976), is a landmark decision of the United States Supreme Court. It reaffirmed the Court's acceptance of the use of the death penalty in the United States, upholding, in particular, the death sentence imposed on Troy Leon Gregg. The set of cases is referred to by a leading scholar as the July 2 Cases, and elsewhere referred to by the lead case Gregg. The court set forth the two main features that capital sentencing procedures must employ in order to comply with the Eighth Amendment ban on "cruel and unusual punishments". The decision essentially ended the de facto moratorium on the death penalty imposed by the Court in its 1972 decision in Furman v. Georgia (1972).

Justice Brennan's dissent said that "The calculated killing of a human being by the State involves, by its very nature, a denial of the executed person's humanity [...] An executed person has indeed 'lost the right to have rights.'"

== Background ==
=== Cases ===
All five cases share the same basic procedural history. After the Furman decision, the states of Georgia, Florida, Texas, North Carolina, and Louisiana amended their death penalty statutes to meet the Furman guidelines. Subsequently, the five named defendants (Note: This article provides information on the crime in Gregg.) were convicted of murder and sentenced to death in their respective states. The respective state supreme courts (Note: At the time Texas had (and still has) separate courts with final power of review over civil and criminal cases; the Texas Court of Criminal Appeals was (and remains) the court with final review power over criminal cases.) upheld the death sentence. The defendants then asked the U.S. Supreme Court to review their death sentence, asking the Court to go beyond Furman and declare once and for all the death penalty to be "cruel and unusual punishment" and thus in violation of the Constitution; the Court agreed to hear the cases.

In the July 2 Cases, the Court's goal was to provide guidance to states in the wake of Furman. In Furman only one basic idea could command a majority vote of the Justices: capital punishment, as then practiced in the United States, was cruel and unusual punishment because there were no rational standards that determined when it was imposed and when it was not. The question the Court resolved in these cases was not whether the death sentence imposed on each of the individual defendants was cruel, but rather whether the process by which those sentences were imposed was rational and objectively reviewable.

=== Capital punishment and the Eighth Amendment ===
The defendants in each of the five cases urged the Court to go further than it had in Furman by holding once and for all that capital punishment was cruel and unusual punishment that violated the Eighth Amendment. However the Court responded that "The most marked indication of society's endorsement of the death penalty for murder is the legislative response to Furman." Both Congress and 35 states had complied with the Court's dictates in Furman by either specifying factors to be weighed and procedures to be followed when imposing a death sentence, or dictating that the death penalty would be mandatory for specific crimes. Furthermore, a referendum in California had overturned the California Supreme Court's earlier decision (California v. Anderson) holding that the death penalty violated the California constitution. The fact that juries remained willing to impose the death penalty also contributed to the Court's conclusion that American society did not believe in 1976 that the death penalty was unconstitutional.

The Court also found that the death penalty "comports with the basic concept of human dignity at the core of the [Eighth] Amendment". The death penalty serves two principal social purposes—retribution and deterrence. "In part, capital punishment is an expression of society's moral outrage at particularly offensive conduct". But this outrage must be expressed in an ordered fashion, for America is a society of laws. Retribution is consistent with human dignity, because society believes that "certain crimes are themselves so grievous an affront to humanity that the only adequate response may be the penalty of death". And although it is difficult to determine statistically how much crime the death penalty actually deters, the Court found that in 1976 there was "no convincing empirical evidence" supporting either the view that the death penalty is an effective deterrent to crime or the opposite view. Still, the Court could not completely discount the possibility that for certain "carefully contemplated murderers", "the possible penalty of death may well enter into the cold calculus that precedes the decision to act".

Finally, the Court considered whether the death penalty is "disproportionate in relation to the crime for which it is imposed". Although death is severe and irrevocable, the Court could not say that death was always disproportionate to the crime of deliberately taking human life. "It is an extreme sanction, suitable to the most extreme of crimes."

=== Historical disapproval of mandatory death sentences ===
The Court was determined to simultaneously save capital punishment in the United States and impose some reasoned basis for carrying it out. That reasoning flows from the Eighth Amendment's cruel and unusual punishment clause. Although capital punishment, per se, was not found by the Court to be cruel and unusual, it must still be carried out in a manner consistent with the evolving standards of decency that mark the progress of a maturing society. In the Court's view, the country's history with capital punishment suggests that those evolving standards of decency could not tolerate a return to the mandatory death penalty for murder that had prevailed in medieval England.

In 18th century Britain, the penalty for a vast number of serious crimes, including murder, was death. This rule traveled with the colonists to America, and was the law in all states at the time the Eighth Amendment was adopted in 1791. By then, however, a problem with the common-law mandatory death penalty had crept into the legal system. If the jury has only two options—convicting a defendant of murder, where the penalty is death, or acquitting the defendant outright—it has no vehicle to express the sentiment that the defendant should be punished somehow, but not executed. Faced with this dilemma, some juries would acquit the defendant in order to spare his life. Of course, this meant that an obviously guilty person would go free.

To mitigate the harshness of the common-law rule, Pennsylvania divided murder into "degrees" in 1794. First-degree murder, a capital crime, was limited to all "willful, deliberate, and premeditated" murders. All other murder was second-degree murder, and not a capital crime. This development eased the tension created by the common-law mandatory death penalty, but some juries still refused to convict defendants who were clearly guilty of first-degree murder because that crime carried a mandatory death penalty.

Recognizing that juries in capital cases found discretion in sentencing desirable, Tennessee, Alabama, and Louisiana afforded their juries this discretion in the 1840s. Finally, the jury could respond to mitigating factors about the crime or the criminal and withhold the death penalty even for convicted first-degree murderers. This development spread, and by 1900, 23 states and the federal government had discretionary sentencing in capital cases. Fourteen more states followed in the first two decades of the 20th century, and by 1963, all death-penalty jurisdictions employed discretionary sentencing.

== Decision of the Court ==
The Court set out two broad guidelines that legislatures must follow in order to craft a constitutional capital sentencing scheme:

- First, the scheme must provide objective criteria to direct and limit the death sentencing discretion. The objectiveness of these criteria must in turn be ensured by appellate review of all death sentences.
- Second, the scheme must allow the sentencer (whether judge or jury) to take into account the character and record of an individual defendant.

In Gregg, Proffitt, and Jurek, the Court found that the capital sentencing schemes of Georgia, Florida, and Texas, respectively, met these criteria; whereas in Woodson and Roberts, the Court found that the sentencing schemes of North Carolina and Louisiana did not.

=== Constitutional sentencing procedures ===
The proposition that the death penalty was not always cruel and unusual punishment was just the beginning of the discussion. Furman had held that "where discretion is afforded a sentencing body on a matter so grave as the determination of whether a human life should be taken or spared, that discretion must be suitably directed and limited so as to minimize the risk of wholly arbitrary and capricious action." The question the Court confronted in these five cases was whether the procedures crafted by Georgia, Florida, Texas, North Carolina, and Louisiana adequately minimized that risk. In all five cases, the Court's primary focus was on the jury.

Although in most criminal cases the judge decides and imposes the sentence, "jury sentencing has been considered desirable in capital cases in order to maintain a link between contemporary community values and the penal system—a link without which the determination of punishment could hardly reflect the evolving standards of decency that mark the progress of a maturing society." The drafters of the Model Penal Code concluded that the now-familiar bifurcated procedure, in which the jury first considers the question of guilt without regard to punishment, and then determines whether the punishment should be death or life imprisonment, is the preferable model. This was the model that the Court approved in these cases—although it tacitly approved a model without any jury involvement in the sentencing process, an approval that persisted until 2002's Ring v. Arizona.

The drawback of having juries rather than judges fix the penalty in capital cases is the risk that they will have no frame of reference for imposing the death penalty in a rational manner. Although this problem may not be totally correctible, the Court trusted that the guidance given the jury by the aggravating factors or other special-verdict questions would assist it in deciding on a sentence. The drafters of the Model Penal Code "concluded that it is within the realm of possibility to point to the main circumstances of aggravation and mitigation that should be weighed and weighed against each other when they are presented in a concrete case." For the Court, these factors adequately guarded against the risk of arbitrary imposition of the death sentence.

Every death sentence involves first an eligibility determination and then a selection of an eligible defendant for the death penalty. A defendant is eligible for the death penalty once the jury has concluded that he is a member of that narrow class of criminal defendants who have committed the most morally outrageous of crimes. An eligible defendant is then selected for the death penalty after the sentencer takes into account mitigating evidence about the character and record of the defendant in order to decide whether that individual is worthy of a death sentence.

In addition to jury sentencing through the guidance of aggravating factors, a constitutional capital sentencing scheme must provide for appellate review of the death sentence, typically by the state's supreme court. This review must not be a rubber stamp; there must be evidence in the state's decisional law that the court takes seriously its responsibility to ensure that the sentence imposed was not arbitrary. Currently, those states which still maintain a death penalty option have a mandatory appeal of the sentence (defendants sentenced to death cannot waive this appeal, but can waive appeals beyond this stage subject to a competency hearing).

With Gregg and the companion cases, the Court approved three different schemes that had sufficiently narrow eligibility criteria and at the same time sufficiently broad discretion in selection. By contrast, the two schemes the Court disapproved had overly broad eligibility criteria and then no discretion in sentencing.

== Capital punishment schemes approved by the Court ==
=== Georgia ===
Under the Georgia scheme (which generally followed the Model Penal Code), after the defendant was convicted of, or pleaded guilty to, a capital crime (under the first part of the bifurcated trial proceeding), (Note: After Georgia revised its death penalty law in response to Furman, there were six capital crimes in Georgia: murder, kidnapping, armed robbery, rape, treason, and aircraft hijacking. The Supreme Court's later decision in Coker v. Georgia, 433 U.S. 584 (1978), invalidated Georgia's death penalty for rape (and probably also for robbery, at least where death does not result).) the second part of the bifurcated trial involved an additional hearing at which the jury received additional evidence in aggravation and mitigation. In order for the defendant to be eligible for the death penalty, the jury needed to find the existence of one of ten aggravating factors:

1. The defendant has previously been convicted of a capital felony or has a history of committing serious felonies.
2. The capital felony was committed while the defendant was committing another capital felony.
3. The defendant created a grave risk of death to others.
4. The defendant committed the crime for the purpose of receiving money or anything else of value.
5. The defendant killed a judge or prosecutor exercising his official duties.
6. The defendant hired a killer.
7. The crime was "outrageously or wantonly vile, horrible, or inhuman in that it involved torture, depravity of mind, or an aggravated battery to the victim." (Note: The vagueness of this language was at issue in the later case of Godfrey v. Georgia, 446 U.S. 420 (1980).)
8. The defendant killed a police officer, prison guard, or fireman in the line of duty.
9. The offense was committed by someone who had escaped from prison.
10. The offense was committed for the purpose of avoiding arrest.

Once the jury found that one or more of the aggravating factors existed beyond a reasonable doubt, then the defendant would be eligible for the death penalty. The jury may, but was not required to, then evaluate all the evidence it had heard, including mitigating evidence and other aggravating evidence not supporting one of the ten factors beyond a reasonable doubt—and decide whether the defendant should live or die. This scheme is called a non-weighing scheme, because the sentencer is not required to weigh the statutory aggravating factors against mitigating evidence before imposing a death sentence. (Note: See Zant v. Stephens, 462 U.S. 862 (1983).)

The Court found that, because of the jury's finding at least one aggravating factor was a prerequisite for imposing the death penalty, Georgia's scheme adequately narrowed the class of defendants eligible for the death penalty. Although there was admittedly some discretion as to the mitigation phase, that discretion is channeled in an objective way, and therefore provided for individualized sentencing. Thus, Georgia's death penalty scheme complied with the Furman requirements and was thus approved by the Court.

=== Florida ===
Florida's scheme differed from Georgia's in two respects. First, at the sentencing hearing of a capital felon, (Note: The crimes punished by death in Florida are first-degree murder and sexual battery of a child under eleven.) the jury determined whether one or more aggravating factors exist, drawing on a list very similar to Georgia's. Then the jury was specifically asked to weigh the mitigating evidence presented against the statutory aggravating factors that have been proved. This scheme is called a weighing scheme.

Second, the jury's role was only advisory; the judge could disregard the jury's sentencing recommendation, but had to explain the reasoning if they did. Under Florida law, if the jury recommended life but the judge imposed a death sentence, "the facts suggesting a sentence of death should be so clear and convincing that virtually no reasonable person could differ." The trial judge must independently reweigh the aggravating factors against the mitigating factors.

The Court concluded that, as the sentencer's discretion was limited in an objective fashion and directed in a reviewable manner, Florida's scheme also adequately narrowed the class of defendants eligible for the death penalty. The Court noted that Florida's scheme came closest to the Model Penal Code's recommendation of an ideal sentencing scheme, as it used a weighing scheme whereas Georgia's scheme did not, thus allowing for individual sentencing. Thus, Florida's death penalty scheme also complied with the Furman requirements and was thus also approved by the Court.

=== Texas ===
Texas's scheme differed considerably from that suggested by the Model Penal Code and followed in large part by Georgia and Florida. In order to narrow the class of death penalty-eligible defendants as required by Furman, the Texas Legislature did not adopt the "aggravating factors" approach outlined by the Model Penal Code. Instead, it chose to modify and severely narrow the legal definition of "capital murder", thus requiring certain objective elements to be present before one could be charged with capital murder and thus eligible for the death penalty. The 1976 law defined capital murder in Texas as involving one of the five situations:

- murder of a police officer or fireman;
- murder committed in the course of committing kidnapping, burglary, robbery, rape, or arson;
- murder committed for remuneration (contract killing);
- murder committed while escaping or attempting to escape from a penal institution; and
- murder committed by a prison inmate when the victim is a prison employee.

If the defendant was convicted of capital murder, and if the prosecution sought the death penalty (which it has never been required to do in Texas), the second part of the bifurcated trial required the jury to consider two (or sometimes three) "special issues":

- whether the conduct of the defendant that caused the death of the deceased was committed deliberately and with the reasonable expectation that the death of the deceased or another would result;
- whether there is a probability that the defendant would commit criminal acts of violence that would constitute a continuing threat to society (under Texas law, "society" was defined as both inside and outside of the prison system; thus, a defendant who would pose a threat to persons inside prison – such as other inmates or correctional officers – would be eligible for the death penalty); and
- if raised by the evidence, whether the conduct of the defendant in killing the deceased was unreasonable in response to the provocation, if any, by the deceased.

If all applicable special issues were answered in the affirmative, then the result would be an automatic death sentence; if any special issue was not answered in the affirmative, the sentence would be life imprisonment.

The Court concluded that Texas's narrow legal definition of capital murder served the same purpose as the aggravating factors in the Georgia and Florida schemes, that being to adequately narrow the class of defendants eligible for the death penalty. The Court even observed that "the principal difference between Texas and the other two States [Georgia and Florida] is that the death penalty is an available sentencing option – even potentially – for a smaller class of murders in Texas".

However, the special issues feature and its automatic death sentence imposition (if all were answered in the affirmative) was the key issue in the Court's analysis. In its review, the Texas Court of Criminal Appeals (the state's highest criminal court, to which all death sentences in Texas are automatically and directly appealed) indicated that the "continuing threat to society" special issue would allow the defendant to present mitigating evidence to the jury. (Note: The Court has subsequently considered at great length the extent to which the Texas special issues allow the jury to consider that evidence. See Penry v. Lynaugh, 492 U.S. 302 (1989); Penry v. Johnson, 532 U.S. 782 (2001); Tennard v. Dretke, 542 U.S. 274 (2004).) The Court concluded that this special issue would allow for the same extensive consideration of mitigating evidence as the Georgia and Florida schemes. Thus, Texas's death penalty scheme, though considerably different from Florida's and Georgia's, also complied with the Furman requirements and was thus also approved by the Court.

The defendant in this case, Jerry Jurek (TDCJ #508), would ultimately see his sentence commuted to life in prison. Texas would later amend its three questions, keeping the "continuing threat to society" question, adding a second question specifically dealing with mitigating evidence, and adding a third question applicable only if the defendant was convicted as an accessory.

== Capital punishment schemes rejected by the Court ==
=== North Carolina ===
In 1974, the North Carolina General Assembly (similar to the approach taken by the Texas Legislature) chose to adopt a narrow definition of "first-degree murder" which would be eligible for the death penalty, which was defined as:

murder perpetrated by means of poison, lying in wait, imprisonment, starving, torture, or by any other kind of willful, deliberate, and premeditated killing, or which shall be committed in the perpetration or attempt to perpetrate any arson, rape, robbery, kidnapping, burglary, or other felony.

North Carolina had also enacted a mandatory death penalty for first-degree rape, but the Court later ruled in Coker v. Georgia that rape is not a capital crime, at least where the victim is not killed; the statutes mandating death penalty for first-degree arson and first-degree burglary were abrogated by the General Assembly.

The North Carolina Supreme Court had ruled that its capital sentencing scheme could survive Furman analysis if the legislature removed the discretionary sentencing provision. However, it was the lack of discretion in sentencing that the Court used to rule the scheme unconstitutional.

=== Louisiana ===
In 1973, the Louisiana Legislature adopted the approach taken by North Carolina, by redefining first-degree murder as the killing of a human being in one of five circumstances:

1. when the offender has a specific intent to kill and is engaged in the perpetration of aggravated kidnapping, aggravated rape, or armed robbery;
2. when the offender has a specific intent to kill a fireman or police officer engaged in the performance of his duties;
3. when the offender has a specific intent to kill and has previously been convicted of an unrelated murder or is serving a life sentence;
4. when the offender has a specific intent to kill or inflict great bodily harm on more than one person; and
5. when the offender has a specific intent to kill and has been offered or has received anything of value for committing the murder

Also, unlike North Carolina, Louisiana law required the jury in all first-degree murder cases to be instructed on second-degree murder and manslaughter, crimes ineligible for the death penalty.

Although Louisiana had created a class of death-eligible crimes somewhat narrower than North Carolina had, it still had a mandatory death penalty for a significant range of crimes, which were aggravated rape, aggravated kidnapping and treason; the lack of discretion in sentencing caused the Louisiana scheme to suffer the same unconstitutional infirmities as North Carolina's.

== Other views expressed in these cases ==
Justices William J. Brennan and Thurgood Marshall expressed their views, which they also articulated in Furman, that the death penalty does not deter crime and that American society has evolved to the point that it is no longer an appropriate vehicle for expressing retribution. In every subsequent capital case that would come before the Court during their tenures, they would refer to their opinions in Gregg in support of their vote against the death penalty.

Justice Byron White countered that capital punishment cannot be unconstitutional because the Constitution expressly mentions it and because two centuries of Court decisions assumed that it was constitutional. Furthermore, for White the judgment of the legislatures of 35 states was paramount, and suggested that the punishment should remain in use. He also felt that the Court should defer to a state legislature's response to the problem of juror response to the prospect of capital punishment, rather than dictate that the Eighth Amendment requires a particular response. White also disagreed that the Constitution required a separate penalty hearing before imposing the death penalty. "Even if the character of the accused must be considered under the Eighth Amendment, surely a State is not constitutionally forbidden to provide that the commission of certain crimes conclusively establishes that the criminal's character is such that he deserves death." He also saw no difference between Louisiana's definition of first-degree murder and Texas's definition of capital murder.

Justice William Rehnquist would have upheld North Carolina's and Louisiana's mandatory death penalties. He disputed the historical evidence adduced in support of the claim that American juries dislike mandatory death penalties. He also felt that the Court's decisions had an analytical flaw. The Court had struck down the mandatory death penalty because it took away discretion from the jury. Yet, Rehnquist pointed out, a jury in Georgia could reject the death penalty for no reason at all. Thus, Georgia's scheme did not alleviate the concerns articulated in Furman about the arbitrariness of the death penalty any more than North Carolina's ignored them. He also disputed whether the appellate review of death sentences inherent in the systems the Court had approved could truly ensure that each death sentence satisfied those concerns. He finally took issue with the idea that the fact that "death is different" requires any extra safeguards in the sentencing process.

== Aftermath ==
Utah was the first state to resume executions after capital punishment was reinstated in the United States in 1976, when Gary Gilmore was executed by a firing squad on January 17, 1977. Following his conviction and death sentence, Gilmore insisted he wanted to be executed, and for this reason some consider the national moratorium to have only ended in 1979 with electrocution of John Spenkelink, who resisted his execution.

The July 2 Cases mark the beginning of the United States' modern legal conversation about the death penalty. Major subsequent developments include forbidding the death penalty for rape (Coker v. Georgia, Kennedy v. Louisiana), restricting the death penalty in cases of felony murder (Enmund v. Florida), exempting the mentally handicapped (Atkins v. Virginia) and juvenile murderers (Roper v. Simmons) from the death penalty, removing virtually all limitations on the presentation of mitigating evidence (Lockett v. Ohio, Holmes v. South Carolina), requiring precision in the definition of aggravating factors (Godfrey v. Georgia, Walton v. Arizona), and requiring the jury to decide whether aggravating factors have been proved beyond a reasonable doubt (Ring v. Arizona).

Gregg has been described as a "judicial surrender to political pressure". In the wake of the Furman decision, 35 states reenacted death penalty statutes. There was a significant shift in the attitudes towards capital punishment between Furman and Gregg; in 1972, when Furman was decided, public support for the death penalty was around 50 percent. By the time Gregg was decided, a mere four years later in 1976, 66 percent of the public favored capital punishment.

In a 2010 interview with Justice Sandra Day O'Connor, Justice John Paul Stevens remarked that there was not one case on which he would vote differently today, "with one exception... the Texas death-penalty case [Jurek v. Texas]." He went on to say that "we made a mistake in that case...I think upon reflection, we should have held the Texas statute... unconstitutional." Two years earlier, Stevens had come out in opposition to the death penalty, writing that his vote in the Gregg cases had been made out of respect for precedent within the court that held capital punishment to be constitutional.

== See also ==
- List of United States Supreme Court cases, volume 428
- List of landmark court decisions in the United States
