= Tennard v. Dretke =

- Supreme Court of the United States

Argued March 22, 2004 Decided June 24, 2004
- Full case name: Robert James Tennard v. Doug Dretke, Director, Texas Department of Criminal Justice, Correctional Institutions Division
- Citations: 542 U.S. 274 (more) 124 S. Ct. 2562; 159 L. Ed. 2d 384; 2004 U.S. LEXIS 4575; 72 U.S.L.W. 4540; 17 Fla. L. Weekly Fed. S 420

Case history
- Prior: Texas trial court sentenced Tennard to death; decision affirmed on appeal; decision affirmed again by the Texas Court of Criminal Appeals; habeas corpus petition denied, Civ. Action No. H-98-4238 (S.D. Tex. July 25, 2000), App. 121; Fifth Circuit affirmed, Tennard v. Cockrell, 284 F.3d 591 (2002); U.S. Supreme Court remanded for reconsideration, 537 U.S. 802 (2002); Fifth Circuit reinstated, 317 F.3d 476 (2003), cert. granted, 540 U.S. 945 (2003).

Holding
- A certificate of appealability should issue where "reasonable jurists would find the district court's assessment of the constitutional claims debatable or wrong."

Court membership
- Chief Justice William Rehnquist Associate Justices John P. Stevens · Sandra Day O'Connor; Antonin Scalia · Anthony Kennedy; David Souter · Clarence Thomas; Ruth Bader Ginsburg · Stephen Breyer

Case opinions
- Majority: O'Connor, joined by Stevens, Kennedy, Souter, Ginsburg, Breyer
- Dissent: Rehnquist
- Dissent: Scalia
- Dissent: Thomas

Laws applied
- U.S. Const. amend. VIII

Tennard v. Dretke, 542 U.S. 274 (2004), was a United States Supreme Court case in which the court was asked whether evidence of the defendant's low IQ in a death penalty trial had been adequately presented to the jury for full consideration in the penalty phase of his trial. The Supreme Court held that not considering a defendant's low IQ would breach his Eighth Amendment rights and constitute a cruel and unusual punishment.

== Background ==
Robert Tennard was convicted of capital murder in Texas. Tennard and two accomplices robbed and killed two neighbors. The evidence presented at trial indicated that Tennard killed one of the victims by stabbing while his accomplice used a hatchet to kill the other victim. The victims were Larry Neblett and Chester Smith, both of whom were killed on August 15, 1985.

The jury was instructed to evaluate Texas's two capital-sentencing "special issues":

1. Did the defendant act "deliberately" to comit the crime?
2. Was the defendant likely to be dangerous in the future?

In the penalty phase of the trial, the defense presented evidence that Tennard's IQ was 67, a fact which the prosecution did not dispute. The prosecutors argued that Tennard's IQ was irrelevant to the case:

But whether he has a low IQ or not is not really the issue. Because the legislature, in asking you to address that question [the future dangerousness special issue], the reasons why he became a danger are not really relevant. The fact that he is a danger, that the evidence shows he's a danger, is the criteria to use in answering that question.

Tennard was sentenced to death.

=== Procedural history ===
The defense appealed to the Texas Court of Criminal Appeals, arguing that the jury instructions in the penalty phase were inadequate in violation of the Eighth Amendment to the United States Constitution, and the Supreme Court precedents Penry v. Lynaugh (Penry I) and Penry v. Johnson (Penry II). In Penry I, the Court held that evidence of intellectual disability had mitigating relevance beyond the scope of the deliberateness special issue.

The Texas Court of Criminal Appeals rejected Tennard's claim because, in its view, a low IQ score alone did not demonstrate that his low intelligence affected his ability to appreciate the wrongfulness of his conduct, learn from his mistakes, or control his impulses.

Tennard then sought federal habeas corpus. The District Court for the Southern District of Texas denied his petition, concluding that the jury had an adequate opportunity to "give effect" to the mitigating evidence. They also denied a certificate of appealability (COA) which was needed to appeal their habeas ruling. The United States Court of Appeals for the Fifth Circuit also denied a COA for similar reasons: a low IQ is not per se constitutionally relevant evidence under Penry and Tennard had not shown that his crime was attributable to low intelligence in a manner that reduced his moral culpability.

The U.S. Supreme Court granted Tennard's writ of certiorari, vacated the judgment, and remanded the case for further consideration in light of Atkins v. Virginia.

On remand, the Fifth Circuit ruled that Tennard had never argued that the Eighth Amendment categorically barred his execution because of intellectual disability, and reinstated its prior decision denying relief. Tennard again sought certiorari, and the Supreme Court granted review a second time.

== Supreme Court ==
=== Decision ===
The opinion by Justice Sandra Day O'Connor was joined by Justices John Paul Stevens, Anthony Kennedy, David Souter, Ruth Bader Ginsburg and Stephen Breyer.

The Court held that Tennard was entitled to a Certificate of Appealability as a threshold requirement because reasonable jurists could debate the merits of his Penry claim. The Court concluded that the Fifth Circuit paid "lip service" to the COA standard but then departed from it, substituting its own "constitutional relevance" requirement. According to the Court, nothing in Penry I or its progeny supported such a test. The Court cited Payne v. Tennessee (1991) for the principle that a capital defendant any relevant mitigating evidence during sentencing.

The Court explained that the Fifth Circuit's test was incompatible with Supreme Court precedent because it would exclude positive character evidence that qualifies as mitigating evidence under the Eighth Amendment. In Skipper v. South Carolina (1986), the Court held that evidence of a defendant's good conduct in jail and ability to adjust peacefully to prison life may be relevant to sentencing, even though it does not directly relate to culpability. The Court observed that the Fifth Circuit's approach would screen out such evidence at the threshold.

The Court pointed to Atkins v. Virginia (2002), which recognized that impaired intellectual functioning is inherently mitigating because individuals with intellectual disabilities are generally less culpable. Nothing in Atkins, the Court explained, required a defendant to establish a causal nexus between diminished intellectual functioning and criminal conduct.

Applying the Slack v. McDaniel (2000) standard for a COA, the Court held that reasonable jurists could debate whether Tennard's sentence was unconstitutional under Penry v. Lynaugh. The Court reasoned that Tennard's low IQ could have been treated as evidence of future dangerousness without giving the jury an adequate means to give that same evidence mitigating effect.

The Court held that Tennard was entitled to a COA, reversed the Fifth Circuit's judgment, and remanded the case for further proceedings.

=== Rehnquist's dissent ===
Relying on Jurek v. Texas (1976), Chief Justice William Rehnquist's dissent emphasized that the Texas special issues system was constitutional, with some recognized exceptions, notably Penry I. In the dissent’s view, the majority read Penry I too broadly when applying it to Tennard's evidence.

=== Scalia's dissent ===
Justice Antonin Scalia said that the Court's Penry line of cases lacks a sound constitutional basis. It concluded that Graham v. Collins (1993) and Johnson v. Texas (1992) correctly limited Penry, and therefore the petitioner's claim did not warrant a certificate of appealability.

== Outcome ==
The Supreme Court held that all relevant mitigating factors must be considered in the penalty phase of a death penalty case. It is not sufficient to allow the defendant to present mitigating factors during the trial if those factors are not considered in the sentencing. If the jury is not instructed to consider all relevant mitigating factors, the defendant's Eighth Amendment rights are violated as failure to do so constitutes cruel and unusual punishment. The court concluded that Tennard's IQ was a relevant mitigating factor, and that the sentencing jury should have been made to consider it for the purposes of mitigation.

Ultimately, Tennard's death sentence was reduced to life in prison.

== Significance ==
The case formed part of a series of decisions in which the Supreme Court adjusted and refined the capital sentencing methods of the various states.

== See also ==
- List of United States Supreme Court cases, volume 542
- List of United States Supreme Court cases
