= Penry =

Penry may refer to:

== Surname ==
- David Penry-Davey (1942–2015), Judge of the High Court of England and Wales
- John Penry (1559–1593), Welsh Protestant
- Johnny Paul Penry (born 1956), American rapist
- Josh Penry (born 1976) American politician
- Mary Penry (1735–1804), Welsh-born woman in colonial Pennsylvania
- Peter Penry-Jones (1938–2009), Welsh actor
- Richard Allen Penry (1948–1994), United States Army soldier
- Rupert Penry-Jones (born 1970), English actor

== Given name ==
- Penry Powell Palfrey (1830–1902), British stained glass designer and painter
- Penry Williams (politician) (1866–1945), English politician
- Penry Williams (artist) (1802–1885), Welsh artist
- Penry Williams (historian) (1925–2013), Welsh historian
- Penry Gustavson (born 1970), American politician

== See also ==
- Penry v. Johnson, 532 U.S. 782 (2001), is a United States Supreme Court
- Penry v. Lynaugh, 492 U.S. 302 (1989), sanctioned the death penalty for mentally disabled offenders
