= Johnny Paul Penry =

Former death row inmate in Texas

Johnny Paul Penry (born May 5, 1956) is a Texas prisoner serving three consecutive life sentences for rape and murder. He was on death row between 1980 and 2008, and his case generated discussion about the appropriateness of the death penalty for offenders who are thought to be intellectually disabled.

Penry's case went twice to the United States Supreme Court: Penry v. Lynaugh (1989) found that executing intellectually disabled persons is not cruel and unusual punishment, and Penry v. Johnson (2001) found that the jury's instructions regarding mitigating factors were incomplete and that Penry should be re-sentenced. In 2008, prosecutors reached a plea agreement with Penry, in which he received three consecutive life sentences and waived his right to be eligible for parole.

== Early life ==
Penry sustained brain damage at birth related to complications from breech positioning. His mother had paranoid schizophrenia. One of Penry's siblings said that their mother would threaten to cut off Penry's genitalia and had forced him to drink his own urine and eat his own feces. "We were all abused, but he was abused the worst," his sister said. Penry did not attend school past the first grade.

== Arrests ==
In 1977, Penry was convicted of rape and sentenced to five years in prison. He was released from prison in the summer of 1979, after serving two years. Penry found work delivering appliances. On October 25, 1979, he raped and murdered 22-year-old Pamela Moseley Carpenter, the younger sister of National Football League kicker Mark Moseley. Carpenter had received an appliance delivery from him a few weeks earlier. Penry had been out of prison for only three months. Penry broke into Carpenter's house and stabbed her with a pair of scissors she had been using to make a Halloween costume for her niece. He then beat and raped her before leaving her for dead. Carpenter eventually died from internal bleeding, but lived long enough to call a friend and provide a description of suspect as she was being transported to a hospital in an ambulance. Penry was arrested by police on the same day.

Penry was convicted of capital murder and sentenced to death on April 9, 1980. After being sentenced to death, Penry flew into a violent rage and had to be subdued by the deputies. He was later convicted of attempted deadly assault on a peace officer for this incident.

== Appeals and U.S. Supreme Court rulings ==
By 1989, Penry's appeals reached the U.S. Supreme Court. In Penry v. Lynaugh, the court held that the execution of intellectually disabled offenders did not constitute cruel and unusual punishment, but it overturned his death sentence, holding that Texas laws on jury instructions had not allowed jurors in Penry's case to adequately consider intellectual disability as mitigating evidence during the punishment phase of his trial.

Penry was retried in 1990 and again resentenced. In 2001, Penry's 1990 conviction was appealed to the U.S. Supreme Court. In Penry v. Johnson, the court ruled, by a 6-3 majority, that the judge presiding over the 1990 trial had given inadequate instructions to the jury in terms of how they should weigh the concerns about Penry's mental impairment when deciding his punishment.

== Subsequent legal proceedings ==
In 2002, Polk County district judge Elizabeth Coker removed his longtime defense attorney, John Wright, from his case. Coker ruled that Wright's continued work on the case might represent a conflict of interest if Penry were to advance an argument of ineffective legal counsel. The judge had previously declared Penry competent to stand trial, but she questioned whether he was able to comprehend an affidavit he signed that said he wanted Wright to continue to represent him.

Coker appointed Stephen C. Taylor to replace Wright as Penry's defense attorney. Prosecutors had earlier consulted with Taylor about how to present arguments that Penry was competent to stand trial. Coker's ruling was criticized by legal ethics expert Stephen Gillers, who said, "This is imaginary law. This is not real-world law. This is Alice in Wonderland law." Wright later returned as Penry's attorney.

In October 2005, Penry's third death sentence was overturned by the Texas Court of Criminal Appeals on the grounds that the jury may not have adequately considered Penry's claims of mental impairment. In the summer of 2006, the U.S. Supreme Court refused to reinstate that sentence.

Wright said that Penry's IQ was between 50 and 60; an IQ of 70 is used as the threshold for intellectual impairment. Prosecutors remained convinced that Penry was not intellectually impaired, pointing to two television interview clips that had been shown at one of his trials. Prosecutor William Hon said that Penry spoke normally on one tape but "like Elmer Fudd" on the other. "It was the most contrived performance you've ever seen in your life," Hon said. He said that Penry was a sociopath and that he had only been sent to a home for the intellectually disabled since he had been such an uncontrollable child.

== Plea agreement ==
On February 15, 2008, Penry agreed to a plea bargain in which he was given three consecutive life sentences for capital murder, aggravated sexual assault, and attempted deadly assault on a peace officer. Prosecutors did not want to risk putting Penry through a fourth trial. The district attorney most familiar with the case had died in 2003. Furthermore, had the fourth jury did not hand down a death sentence, Penry would have served enough time to be eligible for parole immediately under 1970s laws governing life sentences in Texas. As part of the agreement, Penry forfeited all credit for time served and waived his right to be eligible for parole, ensuring that he will spend the rest of his life in prison.

As part of the plea agreement, Penry apologized to Carpenter's family. On the witness stand, he said, "I have committed a bad act and I have caused them a lot of pain."

Penry also had to say that he was not intellectually disabled. After the deal was reached, Carpenter's niece, Ellen May, said she was happy that Penry would remain in prison forever and she said the agreement proved that Penry had been lying about being intellectually disabled. Wright said that it was "galling" for prosecutors to require Penry to say that he was not intellectually disabled, but he characterized the stipulation as "a small price to pay" for eliminating the possibility of execution.

== See also ==
- Atkins v. Virginia, which partially reversed Penry v. Lynaugh
- Bigby v. Dretke, which re-addressed jury instructions in Penry v. Lynaugh
