= Moore v. Texas =

Moore v. Texas may refer to:

- Moore v. Texas (2017), a U.S. Supreme Court opinion on capital punishment regarding death row inmates with mental disabilities
- Moore v. Texas (2019), a U.S. Supreme Court per curiam opinion on capital punishment regarding death row inmates with mental disabilities
