= Hall v. Florida =

- Supreme Court of the United States

Argued March 3, 2014 Decided May 27, 2014
- Full case name: Freddie Lee Hall, Petitioner v. Florida
- Docket no.: 12-10882
- Citations: 572 U.S. 701 (more) 134 S. Ct. 1986; 188 L. Ed. 2d 1007

Case history
- Prior: Hall v. State, 109 So. 3d 704 (Fla. 2012); cert. granted, 571 U.S. 973 (2013).

Holding
- A Florida law allowing the execution of borderline mentally handicapped individuals violated the Eighth Amendment's prohibition of cruel and unusual punishments.

Court membership
- Chief Justice John Roberts Associate Justices Antonin Scalia · Anthony Kennedy; Clarence Thomas · Ruth Bader Ginsburg; Stephen Breyer · Samuel Alito; Sonia Sotomayor · Elena Kagan

Case opinions
- Majority: Kennedy, joined by Ginsburg, Breyer, Sotomayor, Kagan
- Dissent: Alito, joined by Roberts, Scalia, Thomas

Hall v. Florida, 572 U.S. 701 (2014), was a United States Supreme Court case in which the Court held that a bright-line IQ threshold requirement for determining whether someone has an intellectual disability (formerly mental retardation) is unconstitutional in deciding whether they are eligible for the death penalty.

The case fleshed out standards first announced by the Court in Atkins v. Virginia, which left the determination of what constitutes intellectual disability to the states. In Atkins, the Court held that people are intellectually disabled and thus ineligible for the death penalty if these three conditions are met: 1.) "subaverage intellectual functioning," meaning low I.Q. scores; 2.) a lack of fundamental social and practical skills; and 3.) the presence of both conditions before age 18. The Atkins court stated I.Q. scores under "approximately 70" typically indicate disability, but the court let the states determine who is mentally disabled and thus cannot be executed.

== Background ==
Beginning with Atkins v. Virginia (2002) and continuing through decisions involving other death penalty practices and mandatory life imprisonment without parole, the Court's interpretation of the Cruel and Unusual Punishment Clause has moved away from a societal-consensus approach toward one that also examines the rationale underlying the punishment. In Roper v. Simmons (2005), Kennedy v. Louisiana (2008), and Miller v. Alabama (2012), the Court considered the characteristics of the offenders and the nature of the offenses in determining whether the challenged punishments were constitutionally permissible. Although the Court has continued to consider evidence of societal consensus, particularly legislative enactments, it has also increasingly examined whether principles of retribution and general deterrence justify the punishment in question.

== Case history ==
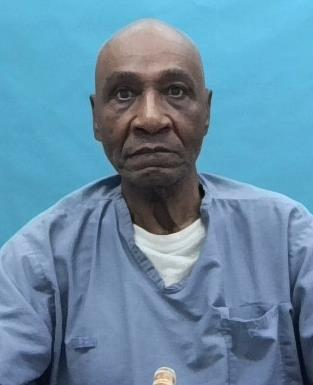
Freddie Lee Hall

On February 21, 1978, Freddie Lee Hall and Mark Ruffin raped and murdered Karol Hurst. Hurst was 21-years-old and seven months pregnant. Afterwards, the pair murdered Lonnie Coburn, a sheriff's deputy, when he tried to apprehend them in a convenience store parking lot.

The death penalty was applied under Penry v. Lynaugh because Atkins had not yet been decided when Hall was first sentenced. After the United States Supreme Court, in Hitchcock v. Dugger, held that mitigating evidence must be allowed, testimony of intellectual disability was presented at resentencing based on Hall's school and court records. After hearing the uncontested testimony, the jury decided to recommend the death penalty.

The sentencing court accepted the recommendation. They found that there was "substantial evidence in the record" to support a finding that Hall had been "mentally retarded his entire life" but questioned the evidence presented by the defense experts:

nothing of which the experts testified could explain how a psychotic, mentally-retarded, brain-damaged, learning-disabled, speech-impaired person could formulate a plan whereby a car was stolen and a convenience store was robbed.

The Florida Supreme Court affirmed the sentence.

In the 2002 case of Atkins v. Virginia, the court ruled that the Eighth Amendment prohibited the execution of the intellectually disabled. After the Atkins ruling, Hall challenged his death sentence on the grounds that he had an intellectual disability. Since his arrest, Hall had received nine I.Q tests, with scores ranging from 60 to 80. There was also significant evidence in school reports and court records of Hall's intellectual disability, a trial judge noted that he had been "mentally retarded his entire life". Hall presented an I.Q score of 71; however, under Florida Law, a person with an I.Q above 70 was not considered intellectually disabled. Hall's appeal to the Florida Supreme Court was dismissed, with the court holding that Florida's 70-point threshold was constitutional.

== Supreme Court ==
=== Decision ===
In Hall, the Supreme Court held 5–4 that Florida's interpretation of the threshold requirement was unconstitutional.

The Court stated that “clinical definitions of intellectual disability ... were a fundamental premise of Atkins v. Virginia.” It explained that those definitions included professional views concerning threshold IQ scores, the standard error of measurement, and adaptive functioning. The Court noted that an IQ score is not an exact measurement and that the standard error of measurement must be considered when interpreting the score. It also emphasized that intellectual disability involves limitations in adaptive functioning. The Court concluded that Florida's rigid IQ cutoff did not account for these clinical considerations and therefore created an unacceptable risk that a person with intellectual disability would be executed.

Justice Anthony Kennedy wrote for the majority that Florida's rigid sentencing law "creates an unacceptable risk that persons with an intellectual disability will be executed, and thus is unconstitutional." If an individual claiming intellectual incapacity has an IQ score that falls somewhere between 70 and 75, then that individual’s lawyers must be allowed to offer additional clinical evidence of intellectual deficit, including, most importantly, the inability to learn basic skills and adapt to changing circumstances.

The court also adopted the term "intellectually disabled" to replace "mentally retarded," which had been used in prior opinions. Intellectual disability is a condition characterized by significant limitations in both intellectual functioning and in adaptive behavior, which covers many everyday social and practical skills, and originates before the age of 18, according to the American Association on Intellectual and Developmental Disabilities, and the term is preferred by the medical profession.

=== Dissenting opinion ===
In his dissent, Justice Samuel Alito criticized the majority's reliance on the views of medical experts, saying that the Justices had overruled Atkins "based largely on the positions adopted by private professional organizations". At the time of the decision, only 12 of the 31 states with the death penalty clearly required consideration of the standard error of measurement (SEM) when determining whether an individual met the IQ threshold for intellectual disability, and at least nine states set the threshold at 70. The dissent noted that the majority decision had effectively made 75 the relevant IQ threshold, based on the standards of the American Psychiatric Association and similar organizations. The dissent argued that this approach departed from the traditional Eighth Amendment inquiry into societal consensus as reflected in legislation and normative analysis.

=== Criticism ===
Critics have questioned whether clinical definitions of intellectual disability are sufficiently suited to determining culpability in criminal cases. After the Atkins decision several commentators noted that the connection between clinical definitions of intellectual disability and the goal of assessing culpability for purposes of criminal law was, at best, imperfect. Laurel A. Weithorn, a psychologist and law professor, observed that intelligence tests were developed for educational and treatment purposes rather than to distinguish between capital defendants whose intellectual deficits make them ineligible for the death penalty and those without such deficits. Academic skills, she noted, do not necessarily correspond to the reduced culpability and deterrability that Atkins identified as relevant to the death penalty.

== Commutation of Hall's death sentence ==
In September 2016, the Florida Supreme Court vacated Hall's death sentence, and re-sentenced him to life imprisonment.

== See also ==
- Jarvis hearings
- List of United States Supreme Court decisions on capital punishment
