= Troy Leon Gregg =

American convicted murderer (1948–1980)

- Born: April 29, 1948; Asheville, North Carolina, U.S.
- Died: July 29, 1980 (aged 32); North Carolina, U.S.
- Cause of death: Homicide by blunt force trauma
- Known for: Gregg v. Georgia
- Motive: Robbery
- Convictions: Murder (2 counts); Armed robbery (2 counts)
- Penalty: Death
- Escaped: July 28 – 29, 1980

Details
- Victims: Fred Edward Simmons; Bob Durwood Moore
- Date: November 21, 1973

Troy Leon Gregg (April 29, 1948 – July 29, 1980) was the first condemned individual whose death sentence was upheld by the United States Supreme Court after the Court's decision in Furman v. Georgia invalidated all previous capital punishment laws in the United States. Gregg participated in the first successful escape from Reidsville State Prison's death row with three other death row inmates in 1980, but was killed later that night during a bar fight.

== Biography ==
Gregg was convicted of murdering Fred Edward Simmons and Bob Durwood Moore in order to rob them. The victims had given him and another man, Dennis Weaver, a ride when they were hitchhiking; Gregg admitted to shooting them, robbing them and stealing their car. The crime occurred on November 21, 1973.

In Gregg v. Georgia, the Supreme Court held by a 7–2 majority that the State of Georgia could constitutionally put Gregg to death; Georgia, in common with Texas and Florida, had instituted a death penalty statute requiring a separate bifurcated trial proceeding to determine punishment in a capital case after the establishment of guilt, establishing a list of aggravating circumstances that must be present to consider a death penalty, and providing for review by the State Supreme Court. It also allowed for consideration of mitigating circumstances; on the same day, the Court, whose primary concern was racial bias in sentencing, rejected the North Carolina and Louisiana death penalty statutes for failure to allow for mitigating circumstances to be considered in sentencing.

== Prison escape and death ==
Murder of Troy Leon Gregg
- Location: Catawba River, North Carolina, U.S. (discovery of body)
- Date: July 29, 1980; 46 years ago
- Attack type: Homicide by suffocation, beating, assault
- Victims: Troy Leon Gregg, aged 32
- Perpetrator: Unknown
- Motive: Disputed
- Accused: James Cecil Horne; William Flamont
- Charges: Horne: Murder (dismissed); Flamont: Accessory to murder after-the-fact (dismissed)

On July 28, 1980, Gregg escaped together with three other condemned murderers, Timothy McCorquodale, Johnny L. Johnson, and David Jarrell, from Georgia State Prison in Reidsville in the first death row breakout in Georgia history. The four had altered their prison clothing to resemble the uniforms worn by correctional officers, then sawed through the bars of their cells and a window and walked along a ledge to a fire escape. They subsequently drove off in a car which had been left in the visitors' parking lot by one of the escapees' aunts. Their escape was not discovered until Gregg telephoned a newspaper to explain their reasons for doing so.

It has been alleged that Gregg was beaten to death later that night in a biker bar in North Carolina, and that his body was found in a lake. Gregg had supposedly been drinking heavily and attempted to assault a waitress. She rebuked his advances and he became violent towards her. One of the local bikers present took offense to Gregg's actions and assaulted and killed him; he and several other locals then dumped the body in a lake located behind the bar. However, news reports from the time of the escape suggest that Gregg may actually have been murdered after getting into a fight with one of his fellow escapees, Timothy McCorquodale, and another man, James Cecil Horne, a member of the Outlaws Motorcycle Club. According to these reports, Gregg's body was discovered in the Catawba River. According to Gregg's autopsy, he died due to homicide by suffocation caused by swelling.

Horne was initially charged with Gregg's murder. Another man, William Flamont, was charged with being an accessory to Gregg's murder after-the-fact. Both men's charges were later dismissed by a judge due to a lack of evidence.

The other escapees were captured three days later hiding in a rundown house owned by William Flamont, another member of the Outlaws who was friends with David Jarrell.

The prison escape prompted prison officials to expedite existing plans to transfer Georgia's death row inmates from the prison in Reidsville to a newer facility, the Georgia Diagnostic and Classification State Prison in Jackson, Georgia.

As for Gregg's co-escapees, Timothy McCorquodale was executed in 1987 for the murder of Donna Dixon in 1974. Johnny Johnson was convicted of murdering Suzanne Edenfield in 1974. David Jarrell was convicted of murdering Mala Still in 1973. Johnson and Jarrell, as of 2025, remain in prison and are serving life sentences.

== See also ==
- List of unsolved murders (1980–1999)
