= List of United States Supreme Court cases, volume 586 =

This is a list of all the United States Supreme Court cases from volume 586 of the United States Reports:

Case name	Docket no.	Date decided
Mount Lemmon Fire District v. Guido	586 U.S. 1	November 6, 2018
Under the Age Discrimination in Employment Act of 1967, state and local governments are covered employers regardless of the number of employees they have.
Weyerhaeuser Company v. United States Fish and Wildlife Service	586 U.S. 9	November 27, 2018
An area is eligible for designation as "critical habitat" under the Endangered Species Act of 1973 only if it is habitat for the listed species; and the decision by the secretary of the U.S. Department of the Interior not to exclude an area from critical habitat under 16 U. S. C. §1533(b)(2) is subject to judicial review.
United States v. Stitt	586 U.S. 27	December 10, 2018
The term "burglary" in the Armed Career Criminal Act includes burglary of a structure or vehicle that has been adapted or is customarily used for overnight accommodation.
Escondido v. Emmons	586 U.S. 38	January 7, 2019
When the Ninth Circuit decided that police officers were entitled to qualified immunity, it did not adequately define the clearly established right that it believed the police officers had violated.
Shoop v. Hill	586 U.S. 45	January 7, 2019
The Sixth Circuit held that Hill's habeas petition was valid because the state-court decisions about whether he was intellectually disabled were contrary to clearly-established Supreme-Court precedent. However, the Sixth Circuit relied repeatedly and extensively on Moore v. Texas, which was not handed down until long after the state-court decisions. The Supreme Court said the reliance on Moore was plainly improper under AEDPA, so it vacated and remanded so that Hill's claim could be evaluated based solely on holdings that were clearly established at the relevant time.
Culbertson v. Berryhill	586 U.S. 53	January 8, 2019
The Social Security Act's 25% cap on awards of attorney's fees applies only to fees for court representation, not to the aggregate fees awarded for representation before the agency and before the court.
Henry Schein, Inc. v. Archer & White Sales, Inc.	586 U.S. 63	January 8, 2019
The Fifth Circuit's "wholly groundless" exception to a valid delegation of arbitrability is inconsistent with the Federal Arbitration Act. Where parties have clearly delegated decisions on arbitrability to an arbitrator, courts must defer to the arbitrator on those questions.
Stokeling v. United States	586 U.S. 73	January 15, 2019
A state robbery offense that includes as an element the common law requirement of overcoming "victim resistance" is categorically a "violent felony" under the definition of the term under the Armed Career Criminal Act of 1984, even when only 'slight force' is required to meet the elements of the crime.
New Prime Inc. v. Oliveira	586 U.S. 105	January 15, 2019
The exceptions in the FAA apply to contractors as they would to employees.
Helsinn Healthcare S. A. v. Teva Pharmaceuticals USA, Inc.	586 U.S. 123	January 22, 2019
A commercial sale of a patent to a third party who is required to keep the invention confidential may place the invention "on sale" under Leahy-Smith America Invents Act, meaning the invention qualifies as prior art that invalidates subsequent patents.
Moore v. Texas	586 U.S. 133	February 19, 2019
Moore was ineligible for the death penalty because of his intellectual disability.
Timbs v. Indiana	586 U.S. 146	February 20, 2019
The Eighth Amendment's Excessive Fines Clause is an incorporated protection applicable to the States pursuant to the Fourteenth Amendment’s Due Process Clause.
Dawson v. Steager	586 U.S. 171	February 20, 2019
A state violates the intergovernmental tax immunity doctrine when it treats retired state employees more favorably than retired federal employees and no significant differences between the two classes justify the differential treatment.
Yovino v. Rizo	586 U.S. 181	February 25, 2019
Because Judge Reinhardt was no longer a judge at the time when the en banc decision in this case was filed, the Ninth Circuit erred in counting him as a member of the majority. That practice effectively allowed a deceased judge to exercise the judicial power of the United States after his death.
Nutraceutical Corp. v. Lambert	586 U.S. 188	February 26, 2019
Federal Rule of Civil Procedure 23(f), which provides 14 days for seeking permission to appeal a class certification order, is "a nonjurisdictional claim-processing rule" that is not subject to equitable tolling.
Jam v. International Finance Corp.	586 U.S. 199	February 27, 2019
The International Organizations Immunities Act grants international organizations the same immunity from suit that foreign governments have under the Foreign Sovereign Immunities Act.
Garza v. Idaho	586 U.S. 232	February 27, 2019
The presumption of prejudice as recognized in Roe v. Flores-Ortega applies regardless of whether a defendant has waived the right to appeal.
Madison v. Alabama	586 U.S. 265	February 27, 2019
The Eighth Amendment may permit executing a prisoner even if he or she cannot remember committing his or her crime, but it may prohibit executing a prisoner who suffers from dementia or another disorder, rather than psychotic delusions.
Fourth Estate Public Benefit Corp. v. Wall-Street.com	586 U.S. 296	March 4, 2019
A registration certificate must be provided before a copyright infringement lawsuit can be filed.
BNSF Railway Co. v. Loos	586 U.S. 310	March 4, 2019
A railroad's payment to an employee for working time lost due to an on-the-job injury is taxable "compensation" under the Railroad Retirement Tax Act.
Rimini Street, Inc. v. Oracle USA, Inc.	586 U.S. 334	March 4, 2019
A federal district court's discretion to award "full costs" to a party in copyright litigation pursuant to 17 U. S. C. §505 is limited to the six categories specified in the general costs statute codified at 28 U. S. C. §§1821 and 1920.
Washington State Dept. of Licensing v. Cougar Den, Inc.	586 U.S. 347	March 19, 2019
The Yakama Nation Treaty of 1855 preempts the state law which the State purported to be able to tax fuel purchased by a tribal corporation for sale to tribal members.
Nielsen v. Preap	586 U.S. 392	March 19, 2019
The government has the power to detain, at any time, undocumented immigrants that have committed certain crimes that could lead to their deportation, even if they were not detained by immigration authorities upon release from criminal custody.
Air & Liquid Systems Corp. v. DeVries	586 U.S. 446	March 19, 2019
In the maritime tort context, a product manufacturer has a duty to warn when its product requires incorporation of a part, the manufacturer knows or has reason to know that the integrated product is likely to be dangerous for its intended uses, and the manufacturer has no reason to believe that the product's users will realize that danger.
Obduskey v. McCarthy & Holthus LLP	586 U.S. 466	March 20, 2019
A business engaged in only nonjudicial foreclosure proceedings is not a "debt collector" under the Fair Debt Collection Practices Act, except for the limited purpose of Section 1692f(6).
Frank v. Gaos	586 U.S. 485	March 20, 2019
The case was remanded for the courts below to address the plaintiffs' standing in light of Spokeo, Inc. v. Robins

== See also ==
- List of United States Supreme Court cases by the Roberts Court
- 2018 term opinions of the Supreme Court of the United States
