= Timothy McCorquodale =

American convicted murderer (1952–1987)

- 1987 mugshot of McCorquodale
- Born: November 2, 1952; Bacon County, Georgia, U.S.
- Died: September 21, 1987 (aged 34); Georgia Diagnostic and Classification State Prison, Georgia, U.S.
- Status: Executed by electrocution
- Conviction: Murder
- Penalty: Death

Details
- Victims: 1
- Date: January 16, 1974
- Location: Atlanta
- Imprisoned at: Georgia Diagnostic and Classification State Prison

Timothy Wesley McCorquodale (November 2, 1952 – September 21, 1987) was an American convicted murderer sentenced to death in Georgia for the 1974 torture and murder of Donna Marie Dixon, a run-away girl from Newport News, Virginia. On January 16, 1974, McCorquodale and an acquaintance, known only as "Leroy", kidnapped 17-year-old Dixon before they raped and tortured the girl to death, and mutilated her body. Leroy was never caught for the crime, but McCorquodale was arrested and charged for his involvement in the murder.

McCorquodale was found guilty of raping and murdering Dixon on April 11, 1974, and sentenced to death by electrocution the next day on April 12, 1974. McCorquodale, who lost his appeals against the death sentence, was incarcerated on death row for 13 years before he was put to death by the electric chair on September 21, 1987.

== Biography ==
Timothy Wesley McCorquodale was born in Bacon County, Georgia on November 2, 1952. McCorquodale completed his schooling up until the 10th grade, and a psychiatric report showed that his IQ was above average. In 1970, when McCorquodale was 18 years old, his parents divorced—a turning point that may have contributed to the instability in his life. Shortly afterward, he joined the U.S. Marine Corps.

While in the Marines, McCorquodale served for 20 months but faced disciplinary problems. In 1971, he was court-martialed for unauthorized absence and for breaking restrictions. His punishment included a fine, two months’ confinement, and ultimately a bad-conduct discharge. According to Marine Corps records, he was also awarded a National Defense Service Medal, issued to all Marines serving during the Vietnam War period. He bore a bulldog tattoo on his forearm, symbolizing his time in the Marines.

After leaving the military, McCorquodale led what was described as a nomadic existence. He became involved with the Outlaws motorcycle gang, embracing a biker lifestyle that would remain an influence even during his incarceration. He sustained his interest in motorcycles through subscriptions to cycling magazines and, years later, by connecting with a Christian motorcycling association while in prison.

== Murder of Donna Marie Dixon ==
On January 16, 1974, 21-year-old Timothy McCorquodale, along with an unidentified accomplice, committed the murder of a teenage girl in Atlanta, Fulton County, Georgia.

17-year-old Donna Marie Dixon, a run-away girl from Newport News, Virginia, and her friend Pamela Pharris were together in "the Strip", an area nearby downtown Atlanta, when they encountered a man only known as Leroy, who was a friend of McCorquodale. Leroy invited them for a beer at a nearby bar. There, the girls spoke with two African-American men. After Leroy left, Donna and Pamela moved to another bar on "The Strip", where Leroy rejoined them. He approached their table and accused Donna and Pamela of stealing $50 from him and giving it to an African-American person. McCorquodale and his girlfriend, Bonnie Succaw (later known as Bonnie Johnson), then joined the group.

At Leroy and McCorquodale's insistence, Johnson and a friend searched the girls in a bathroom but found no money. Afterward, McCorquodale, Leroy, and Johnson forcibly took Dixon in a cab to Johnson's apartment. They arrived just after midnight, finding Johnson's roommate, Linda, and her three-year-old daughter asleep. (McCorquodale had previously lived in Johnson's apartment for about eight months.) Linda joined them in the living room, where McCorquodale and Leroy began discussing Dixon, calling her a "nigger lover" and saying she needed to be taught a lesson. According to the prosecution, the motive behind the abduction and later murder of Dixon was due to the men's rage over Dixon for giving the money to an African-American man, which was suggestive of racial motivations that influenced the commission of the offence.

Afterwards, both McCorquodale and Leroy forcibly stripped Dixon naked and beat her with a belt. Subsequently, the men tortured Dixon in multiple ways, like using cigarettes to burn her breasts, thigh, and navel, using both scissors and razor blades to inflict cut wounds on her nipples and vaginal area, and using a burning candle to drip hot wax over Dixon's body. While torturing Dixon, Leroy forced the victim to perform oral sex while McCorquodale raped the victim, before they swapped roles to commit the same sexual assault on Dixon. In the end, McCorquodale strangled Dixon with both a nylon cord and his bare hands, before he finally broke her neck, killing her.

After murdering Dixon, both McCorquodale and Leroy hid her corpse inside a trunk, which they later brought out of the apartment when the body began to decompose. Dixon was taken out of the trunk and abandoned near a rural road in Clayton County, Georgia, where it was eventually found on January 19, 1974. Police initially wrongly identified the victim as 18-year-old Deborah Susan McCall because McCall's identification papers were found among Dixon's possessions. Pharris later confirmed the victim was indeed Dixon, not McCall. It turned out the real McCall had lost her identification, and Dixon had contacted her, claiming that a friend had found her ID and passed it to her, with Dixon promising to return the document to McCall.

== Trial and sentencing ==
After the discovery of Dixon's body, Timothy McCorquodale was arrested and charged as a suspect behind the murder. Despite the police's efforts to track him down, Leroy, whose real identity remains unknown, was never found.

Prior to his trial, McCorquodale submitted a plea of guilty to the charges against him, a decision which, if accepted, would have allowed him to avoid the death penalty and instead face a mandatory life sentence. Ultimately, the trial judge rejected McCorquodale's guilty plea, and ordered that he should stand trial before a Fulton County jury. The defense attempted to argue for McCorquodale to waive his right to a jury trial, which would similarly take the death penalty off the table if approved, but their request was denied.

On April 11, 1974, after the jury, which consisted of six men and six women, deliberated for just 24 minutes, McCorquodale was found guilty of murder, and was sentenced to death the next day by Fulton Superior Court Judge Osgood O. Williams after the jury unanimously recommended capital punishment.

According to the jurors, their main reasons behind the imposition of death were that the murder was "outrageously wanton and vile, horrible and inhuman in that it involved torture, involved depravity of mind and involved aggravated battery to the victim". Judge Williams set an execution date of May 17, 1974 for McCorquodale, although the execution would be stayed pending a mandatory appeal to the Georgia Supreme Court.

== Prison escape in 1980 ==
On July 28, 1980, six years after he was condemned to death row, Timothy McCorquodale and three other death row inmates – Troy Leon Gregg, Johnny L. Johnson, and David Jarrell – escaped from Georgia State Prison, where the state's death row was located. Johnson was condemned for the 1974 murder of Suzanne Edenfield; Jarrell was convicted of abducting and killing Mala Still in 1973; Gregg was found guilty of the 1973 fatal shootings of Fred Simmons and Bob Moore from Florida.

It was reported that with the alleged assistance of two prison officers, the four inmates used hacksaw blades to saw their way out of their cells and walked out the back door dressed in blue pajamas turned into makeshift prison guard uniforms, thus enabling them to escape the prison facility. Two days later, McCorquodale and two others, Johnson and Jarrell, were arrested while hiding in the house of 33-year-old William Flamont in North Carolina. The fourth escapee, Gregg, however, was found dead in a river near his home in York, South Carolina. Eventually, McCorquodale, Jarrell and Johnson voluntarily chose to be extradited back to Georgia to continue their detention on death row.

In the aftermath, both Johnson and Jarrell had their death sentences overturned, and they were re-sentenced to life in prison. Two men, James Cecil Horne and Flamont, were charged with the murder of the deceased escapee Gregg, but due to insufficient evidence to put them on trial for murder, the men were released by the court.

== Appeals ==
On December 3, 1974, the Georgia Supreme Court dismissed Timothy McCorquodale's direct appeal against his death sentence and murder conviction. In upholding the death sentence of McCorquodale, one of the judges, Georgia Supreme Court Justice Robert H. Jordan, quoted in his own words, "In no case we have reviewed has the depravity of the defendant and the torture of the victim exceeded this case."

Originally, McCorquodale was scheduled to be executed on December 3, 1976, but the Fulton County Superior Court granted McCorquodale an indefinite stay of execution pending a resolution of his upcoming appeal.

On November 28, 1977, the U.S. Supreme Court rejected McCorquodale's appeal against his death sentence.

On October 21, 1981, the U.S. District Court for the Northern District of Georgia turned down McCorquodale's appeal.

On May 31, 1983, the 11th Circuit Court of Appeals allowed McCorquodale's appeal and overturned his death sentence on the grounds of improper jury selection. On December 30, 1983, the 11th Circuit Court of Appeals reinstated the death sentence after it reopened and reheard McCorquodale's appeal.

Subsequently, McCorquodale's execution date was re-scheduled on May 24, 1984, but the execution was stayed by the U.S. Supreme Court two days before it were to happen. McCorquodale's mother described the experience of waiting for her son's execution as tantamount to "pure torture".

== Execution ==
About 13 years after the murder of Donna Dixon, Timothy McCorquodale's execution was scheduled to be carried out on September 21, 1987.

On September 18, 1987, McCorquodale's appeal for a stay of execution was denied by the Georgia Supreme Court, and on that same day, a federal district judge also rejected a follow-up appeal from McCorquodale to stave off his execution. Three days later, on September 21, 1987, the eve of McCorquodale's execution, the 11th Circuit Court of Appeals dismissed McCorquodale's appeal.

As a final recourse to avoid execution, McCorquodale petitioned for clemency from the Georgia State Board of Pardons and Paroles to commute his death sentence to life imprisonment. Several of McCorquodale's relatives and friends, including his father, stepmother and aunt, tried to plead for mercy on behalf of McCorquodale, stating that he was a decent man before embarking on the wrong path and committing a terrible crime. They also claimed that drug and alcohol intoxication affected McCorquodale's state of mind and actions at the time of the murder, and that he was therefore unable to control himself.

However, the parole board refused to grant clemency on the mid-afternoon of September 21, 1987, hours before the execution. According to Parole Board Chairman Wayne Snow, the board observed that McCorquodale did exhibit a considerable amount of remorse for the murder, but they voted against sparing his life due to the fact that the murder of Donna Dixon was one of the most heinous crimes ever committed in the state. Hours before the execution was to proceed, the U.S. Supreme Court, by a 6–2 vote, rejected McCorquodale's final appeal.

On the night of September 21, 1987, 34-year-old Timothy Wesley McCorquodale was put to death by the electric chair at the Georgia Diagnostic and Classification State Prison. McCorquodale was pronounced dead at 7:23pm, minutes after he was strapped to the chair and made his final statement, and reportedly made a thumbs-up to his father (one of the execution witnesses).

In his final hours, McCorquodale spent time with family and friends, and at the time of his execution, McCorquodale's father, cousin, brother-in-law, and a friend were present. For his last meal, McCorquodale ordered boiled shrimp, crab legs, tossed salad, apple pie, ice cream, milk, and hot tea. McCorquodale, who requested a prayer from the prison chaplain, also released a final statement, "I would like to tell my dad and everybody with him I love them very much. Stay strong in Christ."

== See also ==
- Capital punishment in Georgia (U.S. state)
- List of people executed in Georgia (U.S. state)
- List of people executed in the United States in 1987
- List of people executed by electrocution
