= Mitigating factor =

In criminal law, extenuating circumstances

In criminal law, a mitigating factor, also known as an extenuating circumstance, is any information or evidence presented to the court regarding the defendant or the circumstances of the crime that might result in reduced charges or a lesser sentence. Unlike a legal defense, the presentation of mitigating factors will not result in the acquittal of a defendant. The opposite of a mitigating factor is an aggravating factor.

== Examples ==
The Sentencing Council of England and Wales lists the following as possible mitigating factors:

- Admitting the offense, such as through a guilty plea
- Mental illness
- Provocation
- Young age
- Showing remorse

Self-defense is a legal defense rather than a mitigating factor, as an act done in justified self-defense is not deemed to be a crime. If the offender was provoked but cannot be considered to have acted in self-defense, then the provocation can be used as a mitigating factor but not as a legal defense.

== By legal system ==
=== England and Wales ===
According to historical English and Welsh procedure, the jury has no power to determine the punishment to be awarded for an offense. The sentence, with certain exceptions in capital cases, is within the sole discretion of the judge, subject to the statutory prescriptions as to the kind and maximum of punishment. It is common practice for juries to add to their verdict, guilty or not guilty, a rider recommending the accused to mercy on the ground of grave provocation received, or other circumstances which in their view should mitigate the penalty.

=== India ===
According to the Indian procedure the provision of Section 235(2) of Criminal Procedure Code calls upon the Court that the convicted accused must be given an opportunity of being heard on the question of sentence. This provides the accused an opportunity to place his antecedents, social and economic background and mitigating and extenuating circumstances before the court.

Besides the statutory provisions, the Constitution of India also empowers the President and the Governor of the State to grant pardon to the condemned offenders in appropriate cases. These powers are, however, co-extensive with the legislative powers. The power to cut short a sentence by an act of executive in India and elsewhere. The controversy raised in this regard in Nanavati's case has been settled by the Supreme Court once for all in the case of SARAT CHANDRA V/S. KHAGENDRA NATH which affirmed the principle that sentencing power of judiciary and executive are readily distinguishable.

Quite independently of any recommendation by the jury, the judge is entitled to take into account matters proved during the trial, or laid before him/her after verdict, as a guide to determining the quantum of punishment.

=== France ===
Under French law (Code d'instruction criminelle, art. 345), it is the sole right and the duty of a jury in a criminal case to pronounce whether or not the perpetration of the offense was attended by extenuating circumstances (circonstances atténuantes). They are not bound to say anything about the matter, but the whole or the majority may qualify the verdict by finding extenuation, and if they do, the powers of the court to impose the maximum punishment are taken away and the sentence to be pronounced is reduced in accordance with the scale laid down in art. 463 of the penal code. The most important result of this rule in earlier times was to enable a jury to prevent the infliction of capital punishment for murder (now abolished).

=== United States ===
In the U.S., most mitigating factors are presented in ways that are best described by clinical evaluations of the defendant and the circumstances, thus involving psychological or psychiatric analysis in the presentation to the court. Approximately one half of U.S. states allow evidence that the defendant was under extreme mental or emotional distress as a mitigating factor, if it is accompanied by an evaluation that the defendant's ability to appreciate the criminal aspect of his offense (mens rea), or his ability to control his behavior to meet the requirements of the law, was impaired.

There is empirical evidence that expert testimony on future dangerousness has less effect on jury decisions than does expert testimony on the defendant's mental functioning. However, there is no evidence so far that expert testimony does influence the jury on sentencing outcomes in death penalty cases. Mitigation efforts are also often met with cynicism where the presentation of trauma and abuse in the context of a death penalty case can be viewed as nothing more than "the abuse excuse", a phrased coined by Alan Dershowitz.

==== Death penalty ====
In the United States, the issue of mitigating factors is most important in death penalty cases. In a series of decisions since 1972, the United States Supreme Court has attempted to make the sentence of death in the United States less arbitrary by emphasizing that the judge or jury must be given the opportunity to consider all mitigating evidence before determining the sentence. Thus the Court has stressed that because of the constitutional requirement of the fundamental respect for human dignity set out by the Eighth Amendment to the United States Constitution, information must be provided on the character and previous history of the defendant, as well as the circumstances surrounding the particular offense.

The Supreme Court in Penry v. Lynaugh, and subsequently the Fifth Circuit Court of Appeals in Bigby v. Dretke, remanded cases in which the jury instructions in death penalty cases did not ask the jury to consider as mitigating factors the defendant's mental health, saying that the jury be instructed to consider mitigating factors when answering unrelated questions. The Supreme Court's rulings have broadened the definition of mitigating evidence in the United States and systematically removed the procedural barriers to jury consideration and weight of that evidence.

The effect of these decisions is to broaden the definition of mitigating factors related to mental illness within the U.S. justice system, and to be more consistent with standard psychiatric and psychological findings that correlate specific behaviors to identifiable mental disorders. As a result of these decisions, even in the absence of a direct connection between the illness and the illegal action (as is required in the guilt phase of the insanity defense), the court acknowledges that the effects of a severe mental illness have pervasive effect on a person's behavior and can therefore be a relevant consideration in death penalty considerations. If all relevant mitigating factors are not considered in a death penalty case, the punishment can be considered "cruel and unusual", the Supreme Court ruled in Tennard v. Dretke, a case in which the prosecution sought to exclude evidence of a low IQ in the penalty phase of the trial. There is also an ongoing tendency of the Supreme Court to seek to include evidence of a defendant's potential for rehabilitation and a law-abiding future.

==== Limits ====
The Supreme Court held in Lockett v. Ohio that a defendant facing the death penalty is entitled to present any aspect of character or record, and any circumstance of the offense that might serve as a basis for a sentence less than death. The court may limit evidence not pertaining to these issues as "irrelevant". Although it has been argued that the defendant should be able to offer evidence questioning the morality of the death penalty or descriptions of the execution process, no court has allowed such testimony.

== See also ==
- Allocution – Formal statement by a defendant who has been found guilty prior to being sentenced
- Canon 1324 – Catholic Church law
- Capital punishment in the United States
- United States Federal Sentencing Guidelines – Rules for sentencing convicts in the U.S. federal courts system
- Strickland v. Washington
- Settled insanity – Condition caused by long-term substance abuse
- Tennard v. Dretke
