= Fourth Estate Public Benefit Corp. v. Wall-Street.com =

- Supreme Court of the United States

Argued January 8, 2019 Decided March 4, 2019
- Full case name: Fourth Estate Public Benefit Corporation, Petitioner v. Wall-Street.com, LLC, et al.
- Docket no.: 17-571
- Citations: 586 U.S. 296 (more) 139 S. Ct. 881; 203 L. Ed. 2d 147; 129 U.S.P.Q.2d 1453

Case history
- Prior: Motion to dismiss granted, No. 0:16-cv-60497 (S.D. Fla. Mar. 23, 2016); affirmed, 856 F.3d 1338, 122 U.S.P.Q.2d 1586 (11th Cir. 2017); cert. granted, 138 S. Ct. 2707 (2018).

Holding
- A registration certificate must be provided before a copyright infringement lawsuit can be filed.

Court membership
- Chief Justice John Roberts Associate Justices Clarence Thomas · Ruth Bader Ginsburg; Stephen Breyer · Samuel Alito; Sonia Sotomayor · Elena Kagan; Neil Gorsuch · Brett Kavanaugh

Case opinion
- Majority: Ginsburg, joined by unanimous

Fourth Estate Public Benefit Corp. v. Wall-Street.com, 586 U.S. 296 (2019), is a Supreme Court of the United States case in which the Court unanimously ruled that a copyright infringement suit must wait until the copyright is successfully registered by the United States Copyright Office.

== Background ==
While the Copyright Act of 1976 grants automatic copyright privileges to an author when it is published to the public, the Act also requires "registration" of that copyright with the Copyright Office before bringing an infringement suit if the author is American. There had been a Circuit split about whether this "registration" required the Copyright Office to grant or deny the certificate of registration, or whether applying for the certificate could qualify as registration. Some circuit courts, such as the Eleventh and Tenth, held that is considered registered upon the copyright's approval by the Copyright Office, known as the "registration approach." Others, including the Ninth and Fifth Circuits, held that registration occurs upon the application for registration, with the associated deposit and fee; this was known as the "application approach."

Fourth Estate wrote articles and licensed them for publication by other entities. One of their clients, Wall-Street.com, cancelled their licensing arrangement, and the license required Wall-Street.com to remove the content from their site, which they refused to do. Fourth Estate sued for copyright infringement, after having submitted their application for registration but without having waited for the registration to be approved. The United States Court of Appeals for the Eleventh Circuit ruled that the infringement suit could not be brought because of that lack of approval.

== Supreme Court ==
The case was granted certiorari by the Supreme Court, with oral arguments heard on January 9, 2019. Fourth Estate was represented at oral arguments by Aaron M. Panner. Peter K. Stris represented Wall-Street and Jerrold Burden.

Fourth Estate contended that the Eleventh Circuit misread the statute, and believed that the requirement of "registration" refers to the action of the copyright holder, and not an action of the Copyright Office. Further, they contended normatively that a copyright holder's rights should not depend upon affirmative government action.

The court ruled on March 4, 2019, that a registration certificate must be provided before a lawsuit can be filed.

== Comments on the decision ==
It has been observed by one commentator that a decision in Fourth Estate's favor would essentially remove the Copyright Office's role in the process of moving copyright infringement cases to litigation, and concerns about the practical implications of litigating prior to the Register's grant or denial of registration were a prominent theme at the oral arguments.

Others have observed that the practical effect is minimal, since although the turnaround time for a registration with the Copyright Office can be months at a time, the Office offers an $800 expedited review process for cases with "compelling needs" like upcoming lawsuits, and offers preregistration for categories of works more likely to be infringed. Moreover, plaintiffs can recover for any losses accrued from infringement, even while waiting for the examination to be complete.

The decision applies only to filing copyright litigation, and does not apply to other forms of enforcement, such as sending demand letters or issuing DMCA Section 512 takedown notices.
