= Bigby v. Dretke =

- Court: United States Court of Appeals for the Fifth Circuit
- Full case name: James Eugene Bigby v. Doug Dretke
- Decided: March 8, 2005
- Citation: 402 F.3d 551

Court membership
- Judges sitting: Patrick Higginbotham, Harold R. DeMoss Jr., Carl E. Stewart

Case opinions
- Majority: Stewart, joined by a unanimous court

Laws applied
- Due Process Clause

Bigby v. Dretke 402 F.3d 551 (5th Cir. 2005), the U.S. Court of Appeals for the Fifth Circuit heard a case appealed from the United States District Court for the Northern District of Texas (trial court) on the issue of the instructions given to a jury in death penalty sentencing. The decision took into account the recent United States Supreme Court decisions concerning the relevance of mitigating evidence in sentencing, as in Penry v. Lynaugh.

== Facts of the case ==
On December 24, 1987, Grace Kehler returned home in Fort Worth, Texas, to find 26-year-old Michael Trekell (born March 27, 1961), with whom she lived, and their infant son Jayson (born August 1987) dead, the deaths ruled homicides by forensic investigators. On December 26, 1987, Fort Worth police were called to a Fort Worth motel where a police standoff occurred. James Bigby later surrendered without incident. He gave a written statement to the police confessing to the murders two days later. Bigby was charged with the murder of the male victim and of drowning the man's infant son, both of whom he knew. The mother of the murdered infant identified Bigby as being with her son just prior to his death.

Bigby murdered two other men, Wesley Crane and Frank "Bubba" Johnson, the same day he killed the Trekells, but was not charged in either of their deaths.

When the case came to trial in 1991, Bigby used the insanity defense with several psychiatrists testifying to his mental illness. One testified that Bigby had an intractable paranoid schizophrenia with paranoid delusions that prevented him from distinguishing between right and wrong, and concluded that Bigby committed the murders as a direct result of his mental illness.

During a trial recess, Bigby removed a gun from the unoccupied bench of the judge in the courtroom, went to the judge's chambers and aimed the gun at the judge's head, saying "Let's go", after which Bigby was subdued by the judge. The defense made a motion for a mistrial and requested the judge's recusal from the case. Both defense motions were denied. The judge testified in an administrative hearing that Bigby's assault had not biased him against Bigby and the trial was allowed to continue. After the defense rested its case, the judge allowed the rebuttal by the state to introduce testimony regarding Bigby's stealing the gun and threatening the judge, portraying the incident as attempted escape, and further saying this was evidence that Bigby was conscious of his guilt and therefore not eligible for the insanity defense.

After the conclusion of the trial, the jury rejected Bigby's insanity defense. The jury's verdict found Bigby guilty of capital murder in a double homicide and imposed the death penalty.

== Appeals ==
Bigby's direct appeal to the Texas Court of Criminal Appeals stating that the trial court erred in giving the jury unconstitutional instructions, in violation of the United States Supreme Court's decision in Penry v. Lynaugh, 492 U.S. 302 (1989). In Penry v. Lynaugh, the issue was the instructions given to the jury—the jury was instructed to address the issues of whether the death of the victim was deliberate, whether there was probability that the defendant would constitute a continued threat to society, and whether the conduct was an unreasonable response to provocation by the victim. In Penry v. Lynaugh the Supreme Court decided that the defendant's Eighth Amendment rights were violated because the three issues the jury was instructed to consider were not broad enough for the jury to weight the effect of mitigating evidence. The Texas Court of Criminal Appeals, despite almost identical jury instructions given at the sentencing phase of Bigby's trial, affirmed both the conviction and sentence.

After several subsequent denials of appeal and a denial of a writ of habeas corpus by the district court, Bigby appealed to the United States Court of Appeals for the Fifth Circuit, which granted a certificate of appeal to examine Bigby's claim of denial of the right to a trial presided over by a fair and impartial judge and other claims, including the complaints of inadequate instructions to the jury as outlined in Penry v. Lynaugh.

== Decision ==
On March 8, 2005, the United States Court of Appeals for the Fifth Circuit overturned the district court, granted a certificate of appeal, vacated Bigby's sentence, and remanded the case to the district court with instructions to grant habeas corpus relief.

== Aftermath ==
Bigby's case went to a retrial in September 2006 (double jeopardy did not apply, as the ruling did not acquit him outright), where the jury imposed the same death penalty that their counterparts had 15 years previously. Bigby's subsequent appeals were unsuccessful, and he was executed by lethal injection on March 14, 2017.

== Significance ==
Thus the court struck down jury instructions in death penalty cases that do not ask about mitigating factors including a consideration of the defendant's social, medical, and psychological history, saying that the jury must be instructed to consider mitigating factors even when answering unrelated questions. This ruling suggests that an expanded explanation including these factors be given in the jury instructions to insure the jury weighs all the mitigating factors.

This ruling also established that a defendant's mental disorder must be considered as a mitigating factor in sentencing in a death penalty case, even if mental illness was not brought up in the trial.

== See also ==
- Capital Jury Project
- List of people executed in Texas, 2010–2019
- List of people executed in the United States in 2017

Executions carried out in Texas
Preceded by Rolando Ruiz Jr. March 7, 2017	James Eugene Bigby; March 14, 2017	Succeeded by Taichin Preyor July 27, 2017
Executions carried out in the United States
Preceded by Rolando Ruiz Jr. – Texas March 7, 2017	James Eugene Bigby – Texas; March 14, 2017	Succeeded by Ledell T. Lee – Arkansas April 20, 2017
