= BNSF Railway Co. v. Loos =

- Supreme Court of the United States

Decided March 4, 2019
- Full case name: BNSF Railway Co. v. Loos
- Docket no.: 17-1042
- Citations: 586 U.S. ___ (more)

Holding
- A railroad's payment to an employee for working time lost due to an on-the-job injury is taxable "compensation" under the Railroad Retirement Tax Act.

Court membership
- Chief Justice John Roberts Associate Justices Clarence Thomas · Ruth Bader Ginsburg; Stephen Breyer · Samuel Alito; Sonia Sotomayor · Elena Kagan; Neil Gorsuch · Brett Kavanaugh

Case opinions
- Majority: Ginsburg
- Dissent: Gorsuch, joined by Thomas

BNSF Railway Co. v. Loos, 586 U.S. ___ (2019), was a United States Supreme Court case in which the court held that a railroad's payment to an employee for working time lost due to an on-the-job injury is taxable "compensation" under the Railroad Retirement Tax Act.

== Background ==
Michael Loos sued BNSF Railway Company under the Federal Employers' Liability Act (FELA) for injuries he received while working at BNSF’s railyard. A jury awarded him $126,212.78, ascribing $30,000 of that amount to wages lost during the time Loos was unable to work. BNSF asserted that the lost wages constituted "compensation" taxable under the Railroad Retirement Tax Act (RRTA) and asked to withhold $3,765 of the $30,000 to cover Loos’s share of the RRTA taxes. The district court and the Eighth Circuit rejected the requested offset, holding that an award of damages compensating an injured railroad worker for lost wages is not taxable under the RRTA.

== Opinion of the Court ==
Commentators observed that Justice Ginsburg's majority opinion avoided reference to Chevron deference, perhaps because that was necessary to achieve a majority. In dissent, Justice Gorsuch criticized Chevron and praised the majority for seemingly ignoring it.
