= Nutraceutical Corp. v. Lambert =

- Supreme Court of the United States

Decided February 26, 2019
- Full case name: Nutraceutical Corp. v. Lambert
- Docket no.: 17-1094
- Citations: 586 U.S. ___ (more)

Holding
- Federal Rule of Civil Procedure 23(f), which provides 14 days for seeking permission to appeal a class certification order, is "a nonjurisdictional claim-processing rule" that is not subject to equitable tolling.

Court membership
- Chief Justice John Roberts Associate Justices Clarence Thomas · Ruth Bader Ginsburg; Stephen Breyer · Samuel Alito; Sonia Sotomayor · Elena Kagan; Neil Gorsuch · Brett Kavanaugh

Case opinion
- Majority: Sotomayor, joined by unanimous

Laws applied
- Fed. R. Civ. P. 23(f)

Nutraceutical Corp. v. Lambert, 586 U.S. ___ (2019), was a United States Supreme Court case in which the court held that Federal Rule of Civil Procedure 23(f), which provides 14 days for seeking permission to appeal a class certification order, is "a nonjurisdictional claim-processing rule" that is not subject to equitable tolling.

== Background ==
Troy Lambert filed a class action in federal court alleging that Nutraceutical Corporation's marketing of a dietary supplement ran afoul of California consumer-protection law. On February 20, 2015, the district court ordered the class decertified. Pursuant to Federal Rule of Civil Procedure 23(f), Lambert had 14 days from that point to ask the Court of Appeals for permission to appeal the order. Instead, he filed a motion for reconsideration on March 12, which the district court denied on June 24. Fourteen days later, Lambert petitioned the Court of Appeals for permission to appeal the decertification order. Nutraceutical objected that Lambert's petition was untimely because it was filed far more than 14 days from the February 20 decertification order. The Ninth Circuit held, however, that Rule 23(f)'s deadline should be tolled under the circumstances because Lambert had "acted diligently." On the merits, the court reversed the decertification order.
