= Mount Lemmon Fire District v. Guido =

- Supreme Court of the United States

Decided November 6, 2018
- Full case name: Mount Lemmon Fire District v. Guido
- Docket no.: 17-587
- Citations: 586 U.S. ___ (more)

Holding
- Under the Age Discrimination in Employment Act of 1967, state and local governments are covered employers regardless of the number of employees they have.

Court membership
- Chief Justice John Roberts Associate Justices Clarence Thomas · Ruth Bader Ginsburg; Stephen Breyer · Samuel Alito; Sonia Sotomayor · Elena Kagan; Neil Gorsuch · Brett Kavanaugh

Case opinion
- Majority: Ginsburg, joined by unanimous
- Kavanaugh took no part in the consideration or decision of the case.

Laws applied
- Age Discrimination in Employment Act of 1967

Mount Lemmon Fire District v. Guido, 586 U.S. ___ (2018), was a United States Supreme Court case in which the court held that, under the Age Discrimination in Employment Act of 1967, state and local governments are covered employers regardless of the number of employees they have.
