= Dawson v. Steager =

- Supreme Court of the United States

Decided February 20, 2019
- Full case name: Dawson v. Steager
- Docket no.: 17-419
- Citations: 586 U.S. ___ (more)

Holding
- A state violates the intergovernmental tax immunity doctrine when it treats retired state employees more favorably than retired federal employees and no significant differences between the two classes justify the differential treatment.

Court membership
- Chief Justice John Roberts Associate Justices Clarence Thomas · Ruth Bader Ginsburg; Stephen Breyer · Samuel Alito; Sonia Sotomayor · Elena Kagan; Neil Gorsuch · Brett Kavanaugh

Case opinion
- Majority: Gorsuch, joined by unanimous

Laws applied
- 4 U.S.C. § 111

Dawson v. Steager, 586 U.S. ___ (2019), was a United States Supreme Court case in which the court held that a state violates the intergovernmental tax immunity doctrine when it treats retired state employees more favorably than retired federal employees and no significant differences between the two classes justify the differential treatment.

== Background ==
After James Dawson retired from the U. S. Marshals Service, his home state of West Virginia taxed his federal pension benefits as it does all former federal employees. The pension benefits of certain former state and local law enforcement employees, however, were exempt from state taxation. Dawson sued, alleging that the state statute violates the intergovernmental tax immunity doctrine as codified at 4 U.S.C. § 111. Under that statute, the United States consents to state taxation of the pay or compensation of federal employees, but only if the state tax does not discriminate on the basis of the source of the pay or compensation. A West Virginia trial court found no significant differences between Dawson's job duties as a federal marshal and those of the state and local law-enforcement officers exempted from taxation and held that the state statute violated the antidiscrimination provision. Reversing, the West Virginia Supreme Court of Appeals emphasized that the state tax exemption applies only to a narrow class of state retirees and was never intended to discriminate against former federal marshals.
