= Culbertson v. Berryhill =

- Supreme Court of the United States

Decided January 8, 2019
- Full case name: Culbertson v. Berryhill
- Docket no.: 17-773
- Citations: 586 U.S. ___ (more)

Holding
- The Social Security Act's 25% cap on awards of attorney's fees applies only to fees for court representation, not to the aggregate fees awarded for representation before the agency and before the court.

Court membership
- Chief Justice John Roberts Associate Justices Clarence Thomas · Ruth Bader Ginsburg; Stephen Breyer · Samuel Alito; Sonia Sotomayor · Elena Kagan; Neil Gorsuch · Brett Kavanaugh

Case opinion
- Majority: Thomas, joined by unanimous

Culbertson v. Berryhill, 586 U.S. ___ (2019), was a United States Supreme Court case in which the court held that the Social Security Act's 25% cap on awards of attorney's fees applies only to fees for court representation, not to the aggregate fees awarded for representation before the agency and before the court.

== Background ==
The Social Security Act regulates the fees that attorneys may charge claimants seeking Title II benefits for representation both before the Social Security Administration and in federal court. For representation in administrative proceedings, the act provides two ways to determine fees. If a fee agreement exists, fees are capped at the lesser of 25% of past-due benefits or a set dollar amount—at the time of this case, $6,000. Absent an agreement, the agency may set any "reasonable" fee. In either case, which are both under §406(a) of the act, the agency is required to withhold up to 25% of past-due benefits for direct payment of any fee. For representation in court proceedings, fees are capped at 25% of past-due benefits, and the agency has authority to withhold such benefits to pay these fees uner §406(b).

Richard Culbertson represented Katrina Wood in Social Security disability-benefit proceedings before the agency and in district court. The agency ultimately awarded Wood past-due benefits, withheld 25% of those benefits to pay any attorney's fees, and awarded Culbertson fees under §406(a) for representation before the agency. Culbertson then moved for a separate fee award under §406(b) for the court proceedings, requesting a full 25% of past-due benefits. The district court granted the request, but only in part, because Culbertson did not subtract the amount he had already received under §406(a) for his agency-level representation. The Eleventh Circuit affirmed, holding that the 25% limit under §406(b) applies to the total fees awarded under both §§406(a) and (b).
