= Rimini Street Inc. v. Oracle USA Inc. =

2019 United States Supreme Court case

- Supreme Court of the United States

Argued January 14, 2019 Decided March 4, 2019
- Full case name: Rimini Street, Inc., et al. v. Oracle USA, Inc., et al.
- Docket no.: 17-1625
- Citations: 586 U.S. ___ (more) 139 S. Ct. 873; 203 L. Ed. 2d 180; 129 U.S.P.Q.2d 1459

Case history
- Prior: Oracle USA, Inc. v. Rimini St., Inc., 209 F. Supp. 3d 1200 (D. Nev. 2016); 879 F.3d 948, 125 U.S.P.Q.2d 1380 (9th Cir. 2018); cert. granted, 139 S. Ct. 52 (2018).

Holding
- A federal district court's discretion to award "full costs" to a party in copyright litigation pursuant to 17 U. S. C. §505 is limited to the six categories specified in the general costs statute codified at 28 U. S. C. §§1821 and 1920.

Court membership
- Chief Justice John Roberts Associate Justices Clarence Thomas · Ruth Bader Ginsburg; Stephen Breyer · Samuel Alito; Sonia Sotomayor · Elena Kagan; Neil Gorsuch · Brett Kavanaugh

Case opinion
- Majority: Kavanaugh, joined by unanimous

Laws applied
- Copyright Act of 1976, Fee Act of 1853

Rimini Street Inc. v. Oracle USA Inc., 586 U.S. ___ (2019), is a 2019 United States Supreme Court case in which the Court held that the Copyright Act's award of "full costs," to a prevailing party in a copyright infringement claim is limited to taxable costs defined by the Fee Act of 1853, rejecting a broader interpretation that permitted fee awards to include litigation expenses outside the statutory schedule of costs.

The Court cited three prior Supreme Court cases limiting awards to those specified by Congress: Crawford Fitting Co. v. J.T. Gibbons, Inc. (1987), West Virginia University Hospitals, Inc. v. Casey (1991), and Arlington Central School District Board of Education v. Murphy (2006).
