= Helsinn Healthcare S. A. v. Teva Pharmaceuticals USA, Inc. =

- Supreme Court of the United States

Decided January 22, 2019
- Full case name: Helsinn Healthcare S. A. v. Teva Pharmaceuticals USA, Inc.
- Docket no.: 17-1229
- Citations: 586 U.S. ___ (more)

Holding
- A commercial sale of a patent to a third party who is required to keep the invention confidential may place the invention "on sale" under Leahy-Smith America Invents Act, meaning the invention qualifies as prior art that invalidates subsequent patents.

Court membership
- Chief Justice John Roberts Associate Justices Clarence Thomas · Ruth Bader Ginsburg; Stephen Breyer · Samuel Alito; Sonia Sotomayor · Elena Kagan; Neil Gorsuch · Brett Kavanaugh

Case opinion
- Majority: Thomas, joined by unanimous

Laws applied
- Leahy-Smith America Invents Act

Helsinn Healthcare S. A. v. Teva Pharmaceuticals USA, Inc., 586 U.S. ___ (2019), was a United States Supreme Court case in which the court held that a commercial sale of a patent to a third party who is required to keep the invention confidential may place the invention "on sale" under Leahy-Smith America Invents Act, meaning the invention qualifies as prior art that invalidates subsequent patents.

== Background ==
Helsinn Healthcare S. A. made a treatment for chemotherapy-induced nausea and vomiting using the chemical palonosetron. While Helsinn was developing its palonosetron product, it entered into two agreements with another company granting that company the right to distribute, promote, market, and sell a 0.25 mg dose of palonosetron in the United States. The agreements required that the company keep confidential any proprietary information received under the agreements. Nearly two years later, in January 2003, Helsinn filed a provisional patent application covering a 0.25 mg dose of palonosetron. Over the next 10 years, Helsinn filed four patent applications that claimed priority to the January 2003 date. Helsinn filed its fourth patent application in 2013. That patent (the '219 patent) covered a fixed dose of 0.25 mg of palonosetron in a 5 ml solution and was covered by the Leahy-Smith America Invents Act (AIA).

In 2011, Teva Pharmaceutical Industries, Ltd., and Teva Pharmaceuticals USA, Inc. (collectively Teva), sought approval to market a generic 0.25 mg palonosetron product. Helsinn sued Teva for infringing its patents, including the '219 patent. Teva countered that the '219 patent was invalid under the "on sale" provision of the AIA—which precludes a person from obtaining a patent on an invention that was "in public use, on sale, or otherwise available to the public before the effective filing date of the claimed invention"—because the 0.25 mg dose was "on sale" more than one year before Helsinn filed the provisional patent application in 2003. The district court held that the AIA’s "on sale" provision did not apply because the public disclosure of the agreements did not disclose the 0.25 mg dose. The Federal Circuit reversed, holding that the sale was publicly disclosed, regardless of whether the details of the invention were publicly disclosed in the terms of the sale agreements.
