= Jarvis hearings =

Jarvis hearings refer to court processes in Minnesota, United States, that are made for patients who may have mental health disabilities to be given treatment with antipsychotic medicines without their consent. The hearings are based upon a decision of the Minnesota Supreme Court, Jarvis v. Levine, 418 NW 2d 139 - Minn: Supreme Court 1988 Similar rights exist in most other States.
