= Stanton Samenow =

American psychologist and writer (1941–2023)

Stanton E. Samenow (October 16, 1941 – May 8, 2023) was an American psychologist and writer. On his death in 2023, an obituary in the Washington Post noted that he "drew national attention by challenging prevailing views of criminal behavior, arguing that its causes lie not in environmental factors such as poverty but rather in an identifiable 'criminal personality'".

== Biography ==
=== Early life and education ===
Samenow was born to Charles and Sylvia Samenow. He was married, had two children, and resided in Falls Church, Virginia.

=== Career ===
From 1970 through 1978, Samenow worked as a clinical research psychologist for the Program for the Investigation of Criminal Behavior at St. Elizabeth's Hospital in Washington, D.C. With Samuel Yochelson, the findings of their clinical research-treatment study of offenders were published in the three-volume set entitled The Criminal Personality. Samenow, interviewed by The Forensic Examiner in 2005, described it as "the longest in-depth research-treatment study of offenders that has been conducted in North America", lasting a total of 17 years. According to reviewer Dorothy Starr, writing in the American Journal of Psychiatry, Samenow and Yochelson "relentlessly debunk the romanticizing, rationalizing, and analyzing of motivation and causes [of criminal behaviour] and simply call a criminal a criminal". Their work proved controversial and divisive. A reviewer writing in the journal Criminal Justice and Behaviour argued it was "a seminal work, rich in new concepts of criminal treatment," offering "a blueprint to begin the serious work of criminal rehabilitation". Others were disparaging: O.J. Keller, US Parole Commissioner for the Southeastern United States, writing in 1980, argued that the work was "sensational", "simplistic", and had "done real harm to corrections".

From 1978, Samenow was in private practice as a clinical psychologist in Alexandria, Virginia, and "specialized in forensic psychology, notably criminal and child custody matters".

His 1984 book Inside the Criminal Mind, which argued criminals were responsible for crime rather than wider society, turned him into "something of a celebrity", according to a 1984 Washington Post review. His central thesis, that criminals commit crimes through their own free will, because they have different thought patterns, was refined in four more books published over the following three decades. He summarized this thesis in a 2004 op-ed piece in The Washington Times: "Some people choose to do evil. From childhood, they reject everything responsible and positive. Their self-esteem depends upon overcoming others by deceit or force... Until science tells us more, we have no satisfactory explanation for evil. Sociological and psychological determinism offers only more excuses to criminals who have enough of their own". Even so, he believed criminal thinking could be challenged and changed: criminals "have to learn how to live responsibly by implementing new thought patterns, which is the beginning of building values. It's critical to go beyond rational problem solving and teach a corrective thinking pattern".

Samenow sat on three presidential task forces on crime.

He died May 8, 2023.

== Published works ==
=== Books ===
- The Criminal Personality, Volumes I, II & III (1976, 1977, 1986)
- Inside the Criminal Mind (1984)
- Before It's Too Late (1989)
- Straight Talk About Criminals (1998)
- In the Best Interest of the Child (2002)
- Inside the Criminal Mind: Revised and Updated Edition (2004)
- The Myth of the Out of Character Crime (2007)

=== Articles ===
- Understanding the User (unknown date) appeared in Virginia Lawyer.

=== Videos ===
- Good Intentions, Bad Choices: Overcoming Errors in Thinking
- Commitment To Change I: Overcoming Errors in Thinking
- Commitment to Change II: Tactics—Habits That Block Change
- Commitment to Change III: The Power of Consequences
