= 2018 term per curiam opinions of the Supreme Court of the United States =

The Supreme Court of the United States handed down seven per curiam opinions during its 2018 term, which began October 1, 2018, and concluded October 6, 2019.

Because per curiam decisions are issued from the Court as an institution, these opinions all lack the attribution of authorship or joining votes to specific justices. All justices on the Court at the time the decision was handed down are assumed to have participated and concurred unless otherwise noted.

== Court membership ==
Chief Justice: John Roberts

Associate Justices: Clarence Thomas, Ruth Bader Ginsburg, Stephen Breyer, Samuel Alito, Sonia Sotomayor, Elena Kagan, Neil Gorsuch, Brett Kavanaugh (confirmed Oct. 6, 2018)

== Escondido v. Emmons ==
- Full caption: City of Escondido, California, et al. v. Marty Emmons
- Citations: 586 U.S. ___
- Prior history: Summary judgment granted, 168 F. Supp. 3d 1265 (S.D. Cal. 2016); rev'd in part, 716 Fed. Appx. 724 (9th Cir. 2018)
- Laws applied: U.S. Const. amend. IV; 42 U.S.C. § 1983
- Full text of the opinion: official slip opinion · Oyez

586 U.S. ___
Decided January 7, 2019.
Ninth Circuit reversed in part and vacated in part, and remanded.

When the Ninth Circuit decided that police officers were entitled to qualified immunity, it did not adequately define the clearly established right that it believed the police officers had violated.

== Shoop v. Hill ==
- Full caption: Tim Shoop, Warden v. Danny Hill
- Citations: 586 U.S. ___
- Prior history: Petition denied, sub nom. Hill v. Anderson, No. 96-0795, 1999 U.S. Dist. LEXIS 23332 (N.D. Ohio Sept. 29, 1999); rev'd, 300 F. 3d 679 (6th Cir. 2002); petition denied, No. 96-00795, 2014 U.S. Dist. LEXIS 86411 (N.D. Ohio June 25, 2014); rev'd, 881 F. 3d 483 (6th Cir. 2018)
- Laws applied: U.S. Const. amend. VIII; 28 U.S.C. § 2254(d)(1) (Antiterrorism and Effective Death Penalty Act of 1996)
- Full text of the opinion: official slip opinion · Oyez

586 U.S. ___
Decided January 7, 2019.
Sixth Circuit vacated and remanded.

The United States Court of Appeals for the Sixth Circuit held that Danny Hill, who was sentenced to death in Ohio, was entitled to habeas relief under the Antiterrorism and Effective Death Penalty Act of 1996 because the decisions of the Ohio courts concluding that he was not intellectually disabled were contrary to Supreme Court precedent that was clearly established at the time in question. In reaching this decision, the Court of Appeals relied repeatedly and extensively on Moore v. Texas, which was not handed down until long after the state-court decisions.

The Sixth Circuit's reliance on Moore was plainly improper under AEDPA, so the Supreme Court vacated their decision and remanded so that Hill's claim regarding intellectual disability could be evaluated based solely on holdings that were clearly established at the relevant time.

== Moore v. Texas ==
- Full caption: Bobby James Moore v. Texas
- Citations: 586 U.S. ___
- Prior history: Petition denied, Ex parte Moore, 470 S. W. 3d 481 (Tex. Ct. Crim. App. 2015); vacated, sub nom. Moore v. Texas, 581 U. S. ___ (2017); petition denied, 548 S. W. 3d 552 (Tex. Ct. Crim. App. 2018)
- Laws applied: U.S. Const. amend. VIII
- Full text of the opinion: official slip opinion · Oyez

586 U.S. ___
Decided February 19, 2019.
Court of Criminal Appeals of Texas reversed and remanded.

Moore was ineligible for the death penalty because of his intellectual disability.

Roberts filed a concurrence. Alito filed a dissent, joined by Thomas and Gorsuch.

== Yovino v. Rizo ==
- Full caption: Jim Yovino, Fresno County Superintendent of Schools v. Aileen Rizo
- Citations: 586 U.S. ___
- Prior history: Summary judgment denied; vacated, 887 F. 3d 453 (9th Cir. 2018)
- Laws applied: U.S. Const. art. III; 28 U.S.C. § 46(c), §46(d)
- Full text of the opinion: official slip opinion · Oyez

586 U.S. ___
Decided February 25, 2019.
Ninth Circuit vacated and remanded.

Judge Stephen Reinhardt, the author of the Ninth Circuit's majority opinion in this case, died before the case was submitted. Reinhardt's opinion carried six votes, including himself, on a panel of ten judges. Thus, without Reinhardt, the opinion would no longer have been a majority. Nonetheless, the Ninth Circuit submitted his opinion with him reported as a member of the majority after his death.

Because Judge Reinhardt was no longer a judge at the time when the en banc decision in this case was filed, the Ninth Circuit erred in counting him as a member of the majority. That practice effectively allowed a deceased judge to exercise the judicial power of the United States after his death.

Sotomayor concurred in the judgment without separate opinion.

== Frank v. Gaos ==
- Full caption: Theodore H. Frank, et al. v. Paloma Gaos, individually and on behalf of all others similarly situated, et al.
- Citations: 586 U.S. ___
- Laws applied: U.S. Const. art. III; 18 U.S.C. § 2701 et seq. (Stored Communications Act)
- Full text of the opinion: official slip opinion · Oyez

586 U.S. ___
Argued October 31, 2018.
Decided March 20, 2019.
Ninth Circuit vacated and remanded.

The case was remanded for the courts below to address the plaintiffs' standing in light of Spokeo, Inc. v. Robins.

Thomas filed a dissent.

== Box v. Planned Parenthood of Indiana and Kentucky, Inc. ==
- Full caption: Kristina Box, Commissioner, Indiana Department of Health, et al. v. Planned Parenthood of Indiana and Kentucky, Inc., et al.
- Citations: 587 U.S. ___, 139 S.Ct. 1780, 204 L. Ed. 2d 78
- Prior history: Preliminary injunction granted, Planned Parenthood of Ind. & Ky., Inc. v. Ind. Dep't of Health, 194 F. Supp. 3d 818 (S.D. Ind. 2016); summary judgment and permanent injunction granted, 265 F. Supp. 3d 859 (S.D. Ind. 2017); affirmed, 888 F.3d 300 (7th Cir. 2018); rehearing en banc denied, 917 F.3d 532 (7th Cir. 2018)
- Full text of the opinion: official slip opinion · Oyez

587 U.S. ___, 139 S.Ct. 1780, 204 L. Ed. 2d 78
Decided May 28, 2019.
Seventh Circuit reversed in part.

Sotomayor noted without separate opinion that she would deny the petition for a writ of certiorari as to both questions presented. Thomas filed a concurrence. Ginsburg filed an opinion concurring in part and dissenting in part, noting that she would deny the petition for a writ of certiorari as to both questions presented.

== See also ==
- List of United States Supreme Court cases, volume 586
- List of United States Supreme Court cases, volume 587
