= Moore v. Texas (2017) =

- Supreme Court of the United States

Argued November 29, 2016 Decided March 28, 2017
- Full case name: Bobby James Moore, Petitioner v. Texas
- Docket no.: 15-797
- Citations: 581 U.S. 1 (more) 137 S. Ct. 1039; 197 L. Ed. 2d 416
- Argument: Oral argument

Case history
- Prior: Ex parte Moore, 470 S.W.3d 481 (Tex. Crim. App. 2015); cert. granted, 136 S. Ct. 2407 (2016).
- Subsequent: Ex parte Moore, 548 S.W.3d 552 (Tex. Crim. App. 2018); reversed and remanded, Moore v. Texas, 586 U.S. ___ (2019)

Holding
- When deciding if an inmate on death row is qualified as "intellectually disabled", as under Atkins v. Virginia (2002), courts may not ignore dominant medical guidelines.

Court membership
- Chief Justice John Roberts Associate Justices Anthony Kennedy · Clarence Thomas; Ruth Bader Ginsburg · Stephen Breyer; Samuel Alito · Sonia Sotomayor; Elena Kagan

Case opinions
- Majority: Ginsburg, joined by Kennedy, Breyer, Sotomayor, Kagan
- Dissent: Roberts, joined by Thomas, Alito

Laws applied
- U.S. Const. Amend. VIII

Moore v. Texas, 137 S. Ct. 1039 (2017), is a United States Supreme Court decision about the death penalty and intellectual disability. The court held that contemporary clinical standards determine what an intellectual disability is, and held that even milder forms of intellectual disability may bar a person from being sentenced to death due to the Eighth Amendment's prohibition against cruel and unusual punishment. The case clarified two earlier cases, Atkins v. Virginia (2002) and Hall v. Florida (2014).

== Background ==
=== Legal background ===
After Atkins v. Virginia (2002) ruled that executing the intellectually disabled was unconstitutional, states were to establish their own definitions intellectual disability. Between 2003 and 2011 there were several failed proposals in the Texas Legislature to enact a statutory procedure for Atkins claims. Texas had the highest volume of Atkins collateral review claims of any death penalty state at that time.

Without a statutory definition of intellectual disability, the Texas Court of Criminal Appeals in Ex parte Briseno (2004) relied on a 1992 standard and supplemented selected clinical criteria with seven additional factors for assessing deficits in adaptive functioning. The seven Briseno factors included questions like "can the person hide facts or lie effectively in his own or others' interests". However, when the court sought to identify the degree of impairment at which "a consensus of Texas citizens would agree that a person should be exempted from the death penalty" Judge Cathy Cochran compared the degree of impairment to that of Lennie Small, a character with an intellectual disability in John Steinbeck's Of Mice and Men, writing that "Most Texas citizens might agree that Steinbeck's Lennie should, by virtue of his lack of reasoning ability and adaptive skills, be exempt". In 2015, the Texas Court of Criminal Appeals again raised concerns in a separate case about the lack of a uniform procedure for determining intellectual disability, warning that inconsistent practices could lead to unequal treatment of defendants facing execution.

=== Case background ===
Bobby James Moore was sentenced to death in 1980 for killing James McCarble during an attempted robbery of a grocery store in Houston, Texas.

After Moore's conviction was upheld by the Texas Court of Criminal Appeals in 1985, he filed a habeas corpus petition claiming ineffective assistance of counsel in federal court. He was granted a new sentencing hearing in 2001, one year before Atkins was decided, and was again sentenced to death. Moore did not present any intellectual disability defense at that hearing. Moore then filed a state habeas corpus petition, arguing that he had an intellectual disability and could not be executed under Atkins v. Virginia. After a two-day evidentiary hearing that included testimony from family members, his former attorney, and mental-health experts, the judge concluded that Moore met the criteria for intellectual disability based on contemporary clinical guidance, including the American Association on Intellectual and Developmental Disabilities' 2010 handbook and the American Psychiatric Association's 2013 Diagnostic and Statistical Manual of Mental Disorders (DSM-5).

The Texas Court of Criminal Appeals (CCA) denied Moore's habeas claim, concluding that he had not established intellectual disability. In assessing his intellectual functioning, it discounted several test results as unreliable and relied on scores of 78 from 1973 and 74 from 1989. Although both scores fell within ranges that included scores below 70 when accounting for the standard error of measurement, the CCA found no reason to doubt that they accurately represented Moore's intellectual functioning. The CCA also ruled that the habeas court had erred by applying the more recent diagnostic definition of intellectual disability rather than the Briseno standard, which required adaptive functioning deficits to be related to intellectual impairment. Because the habeas court had not made that determination, the CCA concluded that Moore had failed to establish the required relatedness.

The CCA reasoned that Moore's academic and social difficulties might instead have resulted from other circumstances, including adolescent drug use, rather than from limitations in intellectual functioning. The CCA also relied on his improved functioning in prison. This was the relatedness inquiry: whether his adaptive deficits were connected to his intellectual limitations. The U. S. Supreme Court took issue with the CCA's treatment of adverse experiences as evidence against intellectual disability.

The United States Supreme Court granted certiorari.

== Supreme Court ==
In Hall v. Florida (2014), the Supreme Court ruled that states could not bar evidence of adaptive functioning deficiencies solely because a prisoner's IQ score exceeded 70. Texas applied a three-part test that considered IQ scores, adaptive functioning, and whether deficiencies in either area appeared before age 18. The State argued that Moore did not meet this test, citing his IQ scores of 57, 77, and 78, his childhood history, his ability to earn money through odd jobs, and his conduct during and after the robbery. Moore's attorneys countered that the State had selectively relied on his higher IQ scores and overlooked evidence of his childhood limitations. The Supreme Court ruled that the standard for weighing evidence of intellectual disability must be informed by clinical standards to avoid creating "an unacceptable risk that persons with intellectual disability will be executed".

=== Decision ===
First, the Supreme Court considered the CCA finding that Moore did not meet the subaverage intellectual functioning requirement of intellectual disability. Explaining that an IQ of 70 was not a rigid cutoff, the Court found that Moore met the IQ score requirement for intellectual disability:

[In] line with Hall we require that courts continue the inquiry and consider other evidence of intellectual disability where an individual's IQ score, adjusted for the test's standard error, falls within the clinically established range for intellectual-functioning deficits.

The Court clarified that significant limitations in conceptual, social, or practical skills should not be offset by strengths in other adaptive skills, since a person may have substantial deficits in one area despite functioning well in another. It also cautioned against assessing adaptive functioning based on behavior in controlled settings such as prison and noted that the medical profession had sought to counter lay stereotypes about the behavior of people with intellectual disabilities. Finally, it noted that childhood abuse was recognized as a risk factor for intellectual disability.

=== Dissent ===
The Court was unanimous in rejecting the Briseno factors, even though the justices were divided on other issues. Chief Justice John Roberts, joined by Justices Clarence Thomas and Samuel Alito, agreed that Texas had applied the wrong standard in assessing adaptive deficits but would have given the state greater latitude in evaluating the evidence. He considered its remaining findings sufficient to deny relief, arguing that the majority had intervened too readily in the state court's assessment of Moore's intellectual disability.

== Later developments ==
On remand in 2018, the CCA again sentenced Moore to death. Moore appealed to the Supreme Court, and they reversed the decision in a per curiam opinion in Moore v. Texas II, 139 S. Ct. 666 (2019). They held that Moore was ineligible for death because of his intellectual disability; Chief Justice Roberts concurred, while Justices Alito, Thomas, and Gorsuch dissented.

In 2019, a Texas Court of Appeals upheld the decision in Moore v. Texas II, resulting in Moore being granted a re-sentencing in November 2019. At his re-sentencing, his death sentence was commuted to life imprisonment with the chance of parole after 20 years. By that time, Moore had served over 40 years in prison, so he was immediately eligible for parole, but he was not immediately released. In March 2020, a bipartisan group of Texas legislators in a caucus dedicated to reform in the legal system wrote a letter to the Texas parole board advocating for Moore's release. He was granted parole in June 2020 and released from prison on August 6, 2020, into the care of his brother.

As of 2021, there were 28 states that still used the death penalty, and 19 of them cited Moore I or II. Some courts followed Moore I and II clearly, while others did not.
