= Atkins v. Virginia =

- Supreme Court of the United States

Argued February 20, 2002 Decided June 20, 2002
- Full case name: Daryl Renard Atkins, Petitioner v. Virginia
- Citations: 536 U.S. 304 (more) 122 S. Ct. 2242; 153 L. Ed. 2d 335; 2002 U.S. LEXIS 4648; 70 U.S.L.W. 4585; 2002 Cal. Daily Op. Service 5439; 2002 Daily Journal DAR 6937; 15 Fla. L. Weekly Fed. S 397
- Argument: Oral argument

Case history
- Prior: Defendant convicted, York County Virginia Circuit Court; affirmed in part, reversed in part, remanded, 510 S.E.2d 445 (Va. 1999); defendant resentenced, York County Circuit Court; affirmed, 534 S.E.2d 312 (Va. 2000); cert. granted, 533 U.S. 976 (2001).
- Subsequent: Remanded to Circuit Court, 581 S.E.2d 514 (Va. 2003)

Holding
- A Virginia law allowing the execution of mentally disabled individuals violated the Eighth Amendment's prohibition of cruel and unusual punishments.

Court membership
- Chief Justice William Rehnquist Associate Justices John P. Stevens · Sandra Day O'Connor; Antonin Scalia · Anthony Kennedy; David Souter · Clarence Thomas; Ruth Bader Ginsburg · Stephen Breyer

Case opinions
- Majority: Stevens, joined by O'Connor, Kennedy, Souter, Ginsburg, Breyer
- Dissent: Rehnquist, joined by Scalia, Thomas
- Dissent: Scalia, joined by Rehnquist, Thomas

Laws applied
- U.S. Const. amend. VIII
- This case overturned a previous ruling or rulings
- Penry v. Lynaugh

Atkins v. Virginia, 536 U.S. 304 (2002), is a case in which the Supreme Court of the United States ruled 6–3 that executing people with intellectual disabilities violates the Eighth Amendment's ban on cruel and unusual punishments, but that states can define who has an intellectual disability. At the time Atkins was decided, 18 of the 38 death penalty states exempted mentally disabled offenders from the death penalty.

Twelve years later in Hall v. Florida the U.S. Supreme Court narrowed the discretion under which U.S. states can designate an individual convicted of murder as too intellectually incapacitated to be executed.

== Background ==
The Eighth Amendment standard for cruel and unusual punishment, as stated by the Supreme Court in Weems v United States, "may acquire meaning as public opinion becomes enlightened by a humane justice". The court expanded this idea of "evolving standards of decency" to death penalty jurisprudence in Coker v. Georgia holding that death sentences are unconstitutionally excessive if they don't advance legitimate penological purposes or are disproportionate to the severity of the crime.

Later, in Penry v. Lynaugh the court found insufficient objective evidence of a national consensus to rule that executing the intellectually disabled was unconstitutional. Concurring in Penry v. Lynaugh, Justice William Brennan wrote that the proportionality of a punishment depended on the severity of the injury caused and the defendant's moral culpability.

In 1986, Georgia became the first state to outlaw the execution of intellectually disabled people. Congress followed two years later, and the next year Maryland joined those two jurisdictions. Thus, when the Court confronted the issue in Penry in 1989, the Court could not say that a national consensus against executing intellectually disabled people had emerged. Over the next 12 years, 16 more states exempted intellectually disabled people from capital punishment under their laws, bringing the total number of states to 18, plus the federal government.

== Case history ==
Around midnight on August 16, 1996, following a day spent together drinking alcohol and smoking marijuana, the 18-year-old Daryl Renard Atkins (born November 6, 1977) and his accomplice, William Jones, walked to a nearby convenience store, where they abducted Eric Nesbitt, an airman from nearby Langley Air Force Base. When they realized Nesbitt was only carrying $60, they drove him to a nearby ATM where footage from a surveillance camera showed them forcing Nesbitt to withdraw another $200. The two abductors then drove Nesbitt to an isolated location where Nesbitt was shot eight times and killed as he pleaded for his life.

Jones would not answer police questions without an attorney present. A deal of life imprisonment was negotiated with Jones in return for his testimony against Atkins. At trial, the jury decided that Jones's version of events was "more coherent and credible", and convicted Atkins of capital murder.

During the sentencing phase the state sought the death penalty. Forensic psychologist Evan Nelson testified that Atkins had an IQ of 59. Nelson said this was "in the range of being mildly mentally retarded". After hearing the testimony, the jury sentenced Atkins to death.

The Supreme Court of Virginia affirmed Atkins's conviction, but reversed the death sentence on appeal, finding that the verdict form had not included an option for the jury to impose a life sentence.

At the second sentencing hearing psychologist Stanton Samenow testified that Atkins was of "average intelligence at least". Samenow assessed Atkins's vocabulary and knowledge of current affairs, and testified that he understood cause and effect, and could use relatively complex words like orchestra and decimal. Samenow acknowledged that Atkins's academic performance was "by and large" terrible.

The prosecution also presented testimony about Atkins's criminal history which began in early adolescence and included over a dozen prior felony convictions for robbery, larceny and burglary.

Atkins was sentenced to death a second time. The sentence was affirmed by the Virginia Supreme Court based on a prior Supreme Court decision, Penry v. Lynaugh. Justice Cynthia D. Kinser authored the five-member majority. Justices Leroy Rountree Hassell Sr. and Lawrence L. Koontz Jr. authored dissenting opinions. The United States Supreme Court granted certiorari "because of the gravity of the concerns expressed by the dissenters" and "in light of the dramatic shift in the state legislative landscape that has occurred in the past 13 years." The Court heard oral arguments in the case on February 20, 2002.

== Supreme Court ==
=== Majority opinion ===
The "relationship between mental retardation and the penological purposes served by the death penalty" justifies a conclusion that executing intellectually disabled people is cruel and unusual punishment that the Eighth Amendment should forbid. In other words, unless it can be shown that executing the intellectually disabled serves recognized penological goals, doing so is nothing more than "purposeless and needless imposition of pain and suffering", making the death penalty cruel and unusual in those cases.

Justice Stevens relied on clinical diagnostic criteria to conclude that people with intellectual disability "have diminished capacities to understand and process information, to communicate, to abstract from mistakes and learn from experience, to engage in logical reasoning, to control impulses, and to understand the reactions of others". The Atkins Court said cognitive and behavioral impairments not only diminished moral culpability for impulsive conduct, they also made it less likely that defendants would be deterred by the death penalty:

Yet it is the same cognitive and behavioral impairments that make these defendants less morally culpable—for example, the diminished ability to understand and process information, to learn from experience, to engage in logical reasoning, or to control impulses—that also make it less likely that they can process the information of the possibility of execution as a penalty and, as a result, control their conduct based upon that information

Because intellectually disabled people cannot communicate with the same sophistication as the average offender, there is a greater likelihood that their deficiency in communicative ability will be interpreted by juries as a lack of remorse for their crimes. They typically make poor witnesses and the presentation of mitigating evidence of intellectual disability can be a "two edged sword that may enhance the likelihood that the aggravating factor of future dangerousness will be found by the jury". Thus, there is a greater risk that the jury may impose the death penalty despite the existence of mitigating evidence.

The Court concluded that "evolving standards of decency" require an exemption from death penalty for the intellectually disabled because of the heightened risk that the death penalty will be imposed in spite of mitigating evidence and also because the execution of intellectually disabled people serves no legitimate penological purpose. The Court left implementation of that ruling to the states.

=== Dissents ===
Dissenting opinions were written by Justices Antonin Scalia, Clarence Thomas and Chief Justice William Rehnquist. The Chief Justice said that "foreign laws, the views of professional and religious organizations, and opinion polls" were not "objective indicia of contemporary values" under the Court's existing precedents. The dissent objected to broadening the analysis to include this "additional evidence".

Justice Antonin Scalia said there was no clear national consensus to exempt the intellectually disabled from death penalty eligibility and agreed with the Chief Justice that the amici cited to provide "additional evidence" of a national consensus were irrelevant. Scalia commented in his dissent that "seldom has an opinion of this court rested so obviously upon nothing but the personal views of its members."

== Reaction ==
The American Psychiatric Association was supportive of the decision. The Executive Director of the American Association on Mental Retardation said it was "an important day for disability advocates and for our country." Douglas Mossman questioned the implications of the clinical analysis underlying the Atkins decision. He said the court's implicit assumption that moral responsibility or blameworthiness is causally related to a psychiatric diagnosis could be expanded.

== Subsequent developments ==
=== In the Supreme Court ===
Hall v. Florida (2017) was the first case in which the Supreme Court reviewed a state-imposed limitation on intellectually disabled capital defendants’ ability to assert the Eighth Amendment’s protection. Moore v. Texas (2017) then addressed how states implement Atkins v. Virginia, holding that Texas’s nonclinical standards for assessing adaptive deficits created an unacceptable risk of executing individuals with intellectual disability.

=== On remand ===
When Atkins was tested again, after the case was remanded back to state court, he scored above Virginia's cut-off score 70. Prosecutors insisted that the new scores confirmed Atkins was not intellectually disabled. They noted the circumstances of the crime including his ability to load and aim a gun, recognize an ATM card, direct the victim to withdraw cash and attempt to hide his involvement in the robbery from police were inconsistent with being "truly mentally retarded".

The victim's mother was skeptical that Atkins was the right case to develop the law stating that "he's probably not the brightest bulb in the pack but I don't think he's mentally retarded." Defense attorneys described the case as "right on the edge".

In January 2008, Circuit Court Judge Prentis Smiley, who was revisiting the matter of whether Atkins was mentally disabled, received allegations of prosecutorial misconduct. Those allegations, if true, would have authorized a new trial for Atkins. After two days of testimony on the matter, Smiley determined that prosecutorial misconduct had occurred. At that juncture, Smiley could have vacated Atkins's conviction and ordered a new trial. Instead, Smiley determined the evidence was overwhelming that Atkins had participated in a felony murder and commuted Atkins's sentence to life in prison.

Prosecutors sought writs of mandamus and prohibition in the Virginia Supreme Court on the matter, claiming that Smiley had exceeded his judicial authority with his ruling. On June 4, 2009, the Virginia Supreme Court, in a 5-2 decision authored by Chief Justice Leroy R. Hassell Sr., ruled that neither mandamus nor prohibition was available to overturn the court's decision to commute the sentence. Justice Cynthia D. Kinser, joined by Justice Donald W. Lemons, considered the two most conservative justices of the Court, wrote a lengthy dissent that was highly critical of both the majority's reasoning and the action of the circuit court in commuting the sentence.

== See also ==
- List of United States Supreme Court decisions on capital punishment
- List of United States Supreme Court cases, volume 536
- List of United States Supreme Court cases
- Bigby v. Dretke
- Hall v. Florida – 2014 U.S. Supreme Court case limiting the death penalty in the wake of Atkins v. Virginia
- Monster (Walter Dean Myers novel)
