= Penry v. Johnson =

- Supreme Court of the United States

Argued March 27, 2001 Decided June 4, 2001
- Full case name: Johnny Paul Penry, Petitioner v. Gary L. Johnson, Director, Texas Department of Criminal Justice, Institutional Division
- Citations: 532 U.S. 782 (more) 121 S. Ct. 1910; 150 L. Ed. 2d 9; 2001 U.S. LEXIS 4309; 69 U.S.L.W. 4402; 2001 Cal. Daily Op. Service 4516; 2001 Daily Journal DAR 5539; 2001 Colo. J. C.A.R. 2744; 14 Fla. L. Weekly Fed. S 316

Case history
- Prior: On remand after Penry v. Lynaugh, 492 U.S. 302 (1989); sentenced to death on retrial, sentence affirmed Penry v. State, 903 S.W.2d 715 (Tex. Crim. App., 1995); appeal denied, 215 F.3d 504 (5th Cir. 2000); cert. granted, 531 U.S. 1010 (2000).
- Subsequent: Penry v. State, 178 S.W.3d 782 (Tex. Crim. App., 2005)

Holding
- A Texas trial court's supplemental instruction on mitigating evidence of mental retardation for sentencing was not constitutionally adequate. Further, the admission into evidence of statements from a psychiatric report based on an uncounseled interview with the defendant does not violate the Fifth Amendment protection against self-incrimination.

Court membership
- Chief Justice William Rehnquist Associate Justices John P. Stevens · Sandra Day O'Connor; Antonin Scalia · Anthony Kennedy; David Souter · Clarence Thomas; Ruth Bader Ginsburg · Stephen Breyer

Case opinions
- Majority: O'Connor, joined by unanimous (parts I, II, III-A); Stevens, Kennedy, Souter, Ginsburg, Breyer (part III-B)
- Concur/dissent: Thomas, joined by Rehnquist, Scalia

Laws applied
- U.S. Const. amend. V, Antiterrorism and Effective Death Penalty Act of 1996

Penry v. Johnson, 532 U.S. 782 (2001), is a United States Supreme Court case which concerned whether instructions given to a Texas jury were constitutionally adequate to emphasize the mitigating factors in sentencing of defendants who are intellectually disabled ("retarded" in the Court's words.) The Texas courts had determined the sentencing instructions were consistent with prior Supreme Court jurisprudence, but the Court in a divided decision reversed, finding the sentencing instructions insufficient. This was the second time Penry's case made it to the Supreme Court.

== Background ==
In 1989, the U.S. Supreme Court held in Penry v. Lynaugh that Johnny Paul Penry had been sentenced to death in violation of the Eighth Amendment after finding that Texas' special instruction questions did not permit the jury to consider mitigating evidence involving his intellectual disability. On retrial in 1990, Penry was again found guilty of murder. The defense again put on evidence regarding Penry's mental impairments. Ultimately, a psychiatric evaluation, which stated that Penry would be dangerous to others if released, prepared at the request of Penry's former counsel, was cited. Upon submission to the jury, the trial judge instructed the jury to determine Penry's sentence by answering the same special questions in the first trial. Additionally, the trial judge gave a supplemental instruction on mitigating evidence. The court sentenced Penry to death in connection with the jury's answers to the special issues. In affirming the verdict, the Texas Court of Criminal Appeals rejected Penry's claims that the admission of language from the psychiatric evaluation violated his Fifth Amendment privilege against self-incrimination, and that the jury instructions were constitutionally inadequate because they did not permit the jury to consider his specific mitigating evidence. Penry's petitions for state and federal habeas corpus relief failed.

== Opinion of the Court ==
The decision of the Court, authored by Justice Sandra Day O'Connor, was in two parts. Firstly, the Court was unanimous in finding that the inclusion of the psychiatric report was constitutional. O'Connor expressed "considerable doubt" that the psychiatric report "even if erroneous, had a 'substantial and injurious effect'" on the outcome of the trial. However, the Court split 6-3 on whether the supplemental jury instructions on mitigating evidence were constitutionally adequate; the majority holding they were not. "Any realistic assessment of the manner in which the supplemental instruction operated would therefore lead to the same conclusion we reached in Penry I," wrote Justice O'Connor "'A reasonable juror could well have believed that there was no vehicle for expressing the view that Penry did not deserve to be sentenced to death based upon his mitigating evidence.'" Therefore, the case was sent back to Texas for renewed sentencing. Justice Clarence Thomas wrote a dissent as to this part of the decision, joined by then-Chief Justice William Rehnquist and Justice Scalia. Thomas explained that he disagreed with the majority "...because I believe the most recent sentencing court gave the jurors an opportunity to consider the evidence Penry presented". He concluded by attacking the standards the majority used to define proper sentencing instructions, saying the Court was sending "mixed signals to the Texas courts."

Subsequently to this case, the Supreme Court held in Atkins v. Virginia that execution of persons who are intellectually disabled is unconstitutional. This functionally prevented Penry from receiving the death penalty, and he would later be resentenced to life imprisonment.

The decision was part of a series of decisions on the death penalty, all dealing with the "national consensus" on the question.

== See also ==
- Antiterrorism and Effective Death Penalty Act of 1996
