= Penry v. Lynaugh =

- Supreme Court of the United States

Argued January 11, 1989 Decided June 26, 1989
- Full case name: Johnny Paul Penry v. Lynaugh, Director of the Texas Department of Corrections
- Citations: 492 U.S. 302 (more) 109 S. Ct. 2934; 106 L. Ed. 2d 256; 1989 U.S. LEXIS 3148
- Argument: Oral argument

Case history
- Prior: Writ of habeas corpus challenging death sentence denied by United States District Court for the Eastern District of Texas; affirmed, 832 F.2d 915 (5th Cir. 1987); cert. granted, 487 U.S. 1233 (1988).
- Subsequent: Subsequent death sentence affirmed by the Texas Court of Criminal Appeals and then the United States District Court for the Eastern District of Texas; affirmed by the Fifth Circuit, 215 F.3d 504 (5th Cir. 2000); sentence vacated, 532 U.S. 782 (2001).

Holding
- The Eighth Amendment does not forbid executing the mentally disabled; however, the three "special issues" a Texas jury is required to consider before imposing the death penalty did not adequately allow the jury in Penry's sentencing hearing to consider his alleged mental disability as a mitigating factor.

Court membership
- Chief Justice William Rehnquist Associate Justices William J. Brennan Jr. · Byron White; Thurgood Marshall · Harry Blackmun; John P. Stevens · Sandra Day O'Connor; Antonin Scalia · Anthony Kennedy

Case opinions
- Majority: O'Connor, joined by unanimous (Parts I, IV-A); Brennan, Marshall, Blackmun, Stevens (Parts II-B, III); Rehnquist, White, Scalia, Kennedy (Parts II-A, IV-B)
- Concur/dissent: Brennan, joined by Marshall
- Concur/dissent: Stevens, joined by Blackmun
- Concur/dissent: Scalia, joined by Rehnquist, White, Kennedy

Laws applied
- U.S. Const. amend. VIII
- Overruled by
- Atkins v. Virginia, 536 U.S. 304 (2002)

Penry v. Lynaugh, 492 U.S. 302 (1989), was a United States Supreme Court case that upheld the death penalty for mentally disabled offenders because the Court determined executing the intellectually disabled was not "cruel and unusual punishment" under the Eighth Amendment. However, because Texas law did not allow the jury to give adequate consideration as a mitigating factor to Johnny Paul Penry's intellectual disability at the sentencing phase of his murder trial, the Court did remand the case for further proceedings.

== Opinion of the Court ==
The Court ruled that the execution of people with intellectual disabilities did not violate the Eighth Amendment's ban on cruel and unusual punishments, but found Texas's capital sentencing instructions unconstitutional as applied because they did not allow jurors to give effect to evidence of intellectual disability and childhood abuse as mitigating factors. The Court noted that such evidence could be a “two-edged sword,” suggesting future dangerousness as well as reduced culpability.

== Subsequent developments ==
Texas courts continued to construe the state's capital sentencing procedures in ways that restricted the effect of Penry's mitigation holding. In Tennard v. Dretke (2004), the Supreme Court rejected the Fifth Circuit's requirement of a nexus between mitigating evidence and the crime, holding that evidence of mental impairment could be relevant to the jury's sentencing decision even without such a connection. In Smith v. Texas (2004), the Court found that the jury instructions did not adequately provide for consideration of mitigating evidence. In Abdul-Kabir v. Quarterman and Brewer v. Quarterman (2007), the Court again found that Texas's sentencing framework failed to allow meaningful consideration of mitigating evidence, including mental impairments and difficult childhood experiences.

Following a retrial in 1990, Penry was again sentenced to death. The Supreme Court vacated the sentence in 2001, finding that the jury instructions did not provide an adequate means for jurors to give effect to his mitigating evidence. After another retrial, Penry received a third death sentence in 2002, which the Texas Court of Criminal Appeals vacated in 2005 because of faulty mitigation instructions. In 2008, Penry pleaded guilty to the murder and related offenses and received three consecutive life sentences.
