= Jury instructions =

Legal rules from a judge to jurors

Jury instructions, also known as charges or directions, are a set of legal guidelines given by a judge to a jury in a court of law. They are an important procedural step in a trial by jury, and as such are a cornerstone of criminal process in many common law countries.

The purpose of instructions are to inform the jury about the legal principles and standards that they must apply in order to reach a verdict. This ensures that criminal trials are fair and lawful. They are typically delivered after closing arguments, but sometimes may be delivered mid-trial if necessary. Jury instructions are distinct from a directed verdict, when the judge orders the jury to deliver a particular verdict.

In some cases, the instructions given by a judge to the jury are incorrect, which may (depending on the issue) result in a mistrial.

== Content of jury instructions ==
Jury instructions often cover the following issues:

- Introduction to the trial process: An overview of the trial process, the roles of the judge, jury, attorneys, and witnesses, and the importance of the jury's role in the legal system.
- Explanation of the burden of proof: a legal concept crucial to the trial system. This is especially important where different legal issues have a different standard of proof to be applied (whether due to statute, or because of the civil versus criminal standard).
- Legal definitions: explanations of relevant legal terms and concepts, such as the elements of a crime or the elements of a civil claim, as well as any specific legal principles that apply to the case.
- Evidence: Instructions on how the jury should evaluate evidence, including the credibility of witnesses, the admissibility of certain types of evidence, and the weight to be given to each piece of evidence.
- Jury deliberations: Guidelines for the jury's deliberation process, including instructions on reaching a unanimous verdict, the role of the foreman, and procedures to follow in the event of a deadlock.

=== Use of templates ===
Jury instructions are typically drafted using standardized language and templates, which are formulated from various sources such as jury instruction manuals, legal treatises, and case law. However, judges often modify these standard instructions to fit the unique circumstances and legal issues present in each case. Attorneys from both sides may also request specific instructions or modifications and may object to proposed instructions, but the final decision on the content and wording of the instructions lies with the judge.

== Issues ==
=== Role in appeals ===
Jury instructions play a significant role in the appellate process; errors or omissions in the instructions can provide grounds for an appeal. Appellate courts may review instructions given to the jury to determine if they were made in a legally permissible manner. If the appellate court finds an error in the instructions process, it may, if sufficiently problematic, reverse a decision or order a new trial.

=== Comprehending jury instructions ===
A significant issue with standard jury instructions is the language comprehension difficulties for the average juror. The purpose of jury instructions is to inform jurors of relevant laws and their application in the process of coming to a verdict. However, studies have shown that juries consistently run into problems understanding the instructions given to them. Poor comprehension is noted across juror demographics, as well as across legal contexts. Various linguistic features of legalese or legal English, such as complex sentence structures and technical jargon, have been pinpointed as major factors contributing to low comprehension.

Simplifying jury instructions through the use of plain English has been shown to markedly increase juror comprehension. In one study of California’s jury instructions in cases involving the death penalty, approximately 200 university students participated in a research experiment. Half of the participants heard the original standard instructions written in legal English, and half heard revised instructions in plain English. Instructions were read twice to each group, and the participants then answered questions for researchers to gauge their understanding. The results showed a notable disparity in comprehension between the two groups. The group that received revised instructions demonstrated stronger understanding of relevant points such as key concepts, and the ability to differentiate between legal terms.

In another California study, jury instructions were again simplified to make them easier for jurors to understand. The courts moved cautiously because, although verdicts are rarely overturned due to jury instructions in civil court, this is not the case in criminal court. For example, the old instructions on burden of proof in civil cases read:

Preponderance of the evidence means evidence that has more convincing force than that opposed to it. If the evidence is so evenly balanced that you are unable to say that the evidence on either side of an issue preponderates, your finding on that issue must be against the party who had the burden of proving it.

The new instructions read:

When I tell you that a party must prove something, I mean that the party must persuade you, by the evidence presented in court, that what he or she is trying to prove is more likely to be true than not true. This is sometimes referred to as 'the burden of proof.'

Resistance to the movement towards the revision of standard jury instructions exists as well. This is due to the concern that moving away from legal English will result in jury instructions becoming imprecise. There is also the belief that jurors prefer judges to speak in legal language so that they come across as educated and respectable.

=== Jury nullification instructions ===
There is also debate, particularly active in the US, over whether juries that are to judge a criminal case should be informed of the possibility of jury nullification during jury instructions. One argument states that if juries have the power of jury nullification, then they should be informed of it and that neglecting to do so is an act of intervention. Another argument states that defendants should be judged according to the law, and that jury nullification interferes with this process. It is also debated that instructions permitting jury nullification is to be criticized as promoting chaos, as it brings the decision between having a structured set of rules and having less of said rules for a more free set of choices that could also promote the likes of anarchy and tyranny.

Studies have indicated that being informed of jury nullification is likely to affect the judgement of juries when they decide on verdicts. One study that looked into 144 juries showed that they were less harsh on sympathetic defendants and harsher on unsympathetic defendants when they had been briefed on jury nullification. Another study that looked into 45 juries showed that they were likelier to reach a guilty verdict in drunk driving cases and less likely in euthanasia cases, with no reported difference in likelihood in murder cases, with the inclusion of explicit jury nullification details in jury instructions.

== Specific jurisdictional issues ==
=== United States ===
Under the American judicial system, juries are often the trier of fact when they serve in a trial. In other words, it is their job to sort through disputed accounts presented in evidence. The judge decides questions of law, meaning he or she decides how the law applies to a given set of facts. Jury instructions are given to the jury by the judge, who usually reads them aloud to the jury. The judge issues a judge's charge to inform the jury how to act in deciding a case. The jury instructions provide something of a flowchart on what verdict jurors should deliver based on what they determine to be true. Put another way, "If you believe A (set of facts), you must find X (verdict). If you believe B (set of facts), you must find Y (verdict)." Jury instructions can also serve an important role in guiding the jury how to consider certain evidence.

All 50 states have a model set of instructions, usually called "pattern jury instructions", which provide the framework for the charge to the jury; sometimes, only names and circumstances have to be filled in for a particular case. Often they are much more complex, although certain elements frequently recur. For instance, if a criminal defendant chooses not to testify, the jury will often be instructed not to draw any negative conclusions from that decision. Many jurisdictions are now instructing jurors not to communicate about the case through social networking services like Facebook and Twitter.

=== United Kingdom ===
The judge presents directions to the jury court, after overlapping instructions have been provided by a DVD and a jury manager.

=== Australia ===
In Australia, as in other common law jurisdictions, jury instructions serve as essential guidelines for jurors in both criminal and civil trials, although trial by jury for civil matters is now rare. Each state and territory has its own legislation and rules governing jury instructions; although commonalities exist across the jurisdictions. These commonalities are due to harmonious legislation, and a nationally unified common law.

To promote consistency and clarity in jury instructions, Australian jurisdictions have developed standard jury directions or "Bench Books" that provide judges with templates and guidance on instructing jurors. The Bench Books are regularly updated to reflect changes in legislation and case law. Examples include the Victorian Criminal Charge Book, the New South Wales Criminal Trial Bench Book, and the Queensland Supreme and District Courts Benchbook.
