= Forensic psychiatry =

Subspeciality of psychiatry related to criminology

Forensic psychiatry is a subspecialty of psychiatry related to criminology. It encompasses the intersection between law and psychiatry. According to the American Academy of Psychiatry and the Law, it is defined as "a subspecialty of psychiatry in which scientific and clinical expertise is applied in legal contexts involving civil, criminal, correctional, regulatory, or legislative matters, and in specialized clinical consultations in areas such as risk assessment or employment". A forensic psychiatrist provides services—such as assessing competency to stand trial—to a court to help with the legal process and provides treatment, including medications and psychotherapy, to offenders.

Forensic psychiatry plays a substantial role in improving the safety of environments and the quality of mental health care within the criminal justice system. Forensic psychiatrists can reduce recidivism and help with successful rehabilitation of inmates by recognizing and treating the mental health problems in offenders. They also help courts make informed decisions ensuring fair treatment for individuals with mental disorders and helping them understand their condition better.

== Court work ==
Forensic psychiatrists work with courts in evaluating an individual's competency to stand trial (CST), defenses based on mental disorders (e.g., the insanity defense), and sentencing recommendations. The two major areas of criminal evaluations in forensic psychiatry are CST and mental state at the time of the offense (MSO).

=== Competency to stand trial ===
CST evaluations are to determine that defendants have the competence to understand the charges and assist their attorneys. In the United States, this is required by the Fifth Amendment, which ensures the right to be present at one's trial, to face one's accusers, and to receive assistance from an attorney. CST, sometimes referred to as adjudicative competency, serves three purposes: "preserving the dignity of the criminal process, reducing the risk of erroneous convictions, and protecting defendants' decision-making autonomy".

In 1960, the Supreme Court of the United States in Dusky v. United States established the standard for federal courts, ruling that "the test must be whether the defendant has sufficient present ability to consult with his attorney with a reasonable degree of rational understanding and a rational as well as factual understanding of proceedings against him." The evaluations must assess a defendant's ability to assist their legal counsel, meaning that they understand the legal charges against them, the implications of being a defendant, and the adversarial nature of the proceedings, including the roles played by defense counsel, prosecutors, judges, and the jury. They must be able to communicate relevant information to their attorney and understand information provided by their attorney. Finally, they must be competent to make important decisions, such as whether or not to accept a plea agreement.

In England, Wales, Scotland, and Ireland, a similar legal concept is that of "fitness to plead".

=== As an expert witness ===
Forensic psychiatrists are often called to be expert witnesses in both criminal and civil proceedings. Expert witnesses give their opinions about a specific issue. Often, the psychiatrist will have prepared a detailed report before testifying. The primary duty of the expert witness is to provide an independent opinion to the court. An expert is allowed to testify in court with respect to matters of opinion only when the matters in question are not ordinarily understandable to the finders of fact, be they judge or jury. As such, prominent leaders in the field of forensic psychiatry, including Thomas Gutheil, Robert Simon, Liza Gold, and others, have identified teaching as a critical dimension in the role of expert witness. The expert will be asked to form an opinion and to testify about that opinion, but in so doing will explain the basis for that opinion, which will include important concepts, approaches, and methods used in psychiatry.

=== Mental state opinion ===
A mental state opinion (MSO) gives the court an opinion as to whether a defendant was able to understand what they were doing at the time of the crime. This is worded differently in many states, and has been rejected altogether in some, but in every setting, the intent to do a criminal act and the understanding of the criminal nature of the act bear on the final disposition of the case. Much of forensic psychiatry is guided by significant court rulings or laws that bear on this area which include these three standards:

- M'Naghten rules: Excuses a defendant who, by virtue of a defect of reason or disease of the mind, does not know the nature and quality of the act, or, if he or she does, does not know that the act is indeed wrong.
- Durham rule: Excuses a defendant whose conduct is the product of a mental disorder.
- ALI test: Excuses a defendant who, because of a mental disease or defect, lacks substantial capacity to appreciate the criminality (wrongfulness) of his or her conduct or to conform his conduct to the requirements of law.

"Not guilty by reason of insanity" (NGRI) is one potential outcome in this type of trial. Importantly, insanity is a legal and not a medical term. Often, psychiatrists may be testifying for both the defense and the prosecution.

Forensic psychiatrists are also involved in the care of prisoners, both in jails and prisons, and in the care of the mentally ill who have committed criminal acts (such as those who have been found not guilty by reason of insanity).

== Forensic psychiatry vs psychology ==
=== Forensic psychiatry ===
Forensic psychiatrists focus on how biological factors apply to the legal system. They focus more on the scientific facts as well as diagnosing and treating mental disorders. They legally assess clients, provide a diagnosis, and can prescribe medication if necessary. Forensic psychiatrists are physicians, who in the United States, hold a Doctor of Medicine (MD) or Doctor of Osteopathic Medicine (DO) degree. They can prescribe medications.

=== Forensic psychology ===
Forensic psychologists examine how various disorders and conditions can be applied in court. Their job typically entail working with psychological testing. They often determine trial competency, assess the risk of inmates, and aid in jury selection. Forensic psychologists can use information learned about mental health and criminal justice to advocate for those who have a mental illness. They hold a PhD in psychology or a doctorate of psychology (PsyD), and are required to be licensed by a state. They are not physicians and cannot prescribe medication.

== Risk management ==
Many past offenders against other people, and suspected or potential future offenders with mental health problems or an intellectual or developmental disability, are supervised in the community by forensic psychiatric teams made up of a variety of professionals, including psychiatrists, psychologists, nurses, and care workers. These teams have dual responsibilities: to promote both the welfare of their patients and the safety of the public. The aim is not so much to predict as to prevent violence, by means of risk management.

Risk assessment and management is a growth area in the forensic field, with much Canadian academic work being done in Ontario and British Columbia. This began with the attempt to predict the likelihood of a particular kind of offense being repeated, by combining "static" indicators from personal history and offense details in actuarial instruments such as the RRASOR and Static-99, which were shown to be more accurate than unaided professional judgment. More recently, use is being made also of "dynamic" risk factors, such as attitudes, impulsivity, mental state, family and social circumstances, substance use, and the availability and acceptance of support, to make a "structured professional judgment." The aim of this is to move away from prediction to prevention, by identifying and then managing risk factors. This may entail monitoring, treatment, rehabilitation, supervision, and victim safety planning and depends on the availability of funding and legal powers.

Risk management in forensic psychiatry is often done using standardised tests called structured professional judgement tools. Two such tools include the HCR-20 and the newer SAPROF developed in the late 2010s. These tools are used to measure the likelihood of recidivism and identify protective factors for offenders.

== United Kingdom ==
In the UK, most forensic psychiatrists work for the National Health Service, in specialist secure units caring for mentally ill offenders (as well as people whose behaviour has made them impossible to manage in other hospitals). These can be either medium secure units (of which there are many throughout the country) or high secure hospitals (also known as special hospitals), of which three are in England and one in Scotland (the State Hospital, Carstairs), the best known of which is Broadmoor Hospital. The other 'specials' are Ashworth hospital in Maghull, Liverpool, and Rampton hospital in Nottinghamshire. Also, a number of private-sector medium secure units sell their beds exclusively to the NHS, as not enough secure beds are available in the NHS system.

Forensic psychiatrists often also do prison inreach work, in which they go into prisons and assess and treat people suspected of having mental disorders; much of the day-to-day work of these psychiatrists comprises care of very seriously mentally ill patients, especially those with schizophrenia. Some units also treat people with severe personality disorder or learning disabilities. The areas of assessment for courts are also somewhat different in Britain, because of differing mental health law. Fitness to plead and mental state at the time of the offence are indeed issues given consideration, but the mental state at the time of trial is also a major issue, and this assessment most commonly leads to the use of mental health legislation to detain people in hospitals, as opposed to their getting a prison sentence.

Learning-disabled offenders who are a continuing risk to others may be detained in learning-disability hospitals (or specialised community-based units with a similar regimen, as the hospitals have mostly been closed). This includes those who commit serious crimes of violence, including sexual violence, and fire-setting. They would be cared for by learning disability psychiatrists and registered learning disability nurses. Some psychiatrists doing this work have dual training in learning disability and forensic psychiatry or learning disability and adolescent psychiatry. Some nurses would have training in mental health, also.

Court work (medicolegal work) is generally undertaken as private work by psychiatrists (most often forensic psychiatrists), as well as forensic and clinical psychologists, who usually also work within the NHS. This work is generally funded by the Legal Services Commission (used to be called Legal Aid).

== United States ==
Forensic psychiatrists typically work with attorneys and judges. Their purpose is to mediate psychiatric-legal issues that require a more professional perspective. Their scope of practice also includes helping their clients improve their mental status. A few duties that are typically expected of a forensic psychiatrist include determining readiness for parole, conducting assessments to determine any mental issues, evaluating injuries and their effects on the client, and determining competency. All of these tasks have one thing in common: their main focus is on evaluating capacity and competence.

These workers play an important role in combating the phenomenon of "double revolving doors" between hospitals and prisons. Many mentally ill patients will rotate between hospitals and prisons because they are not getting the help they need. Legal decisions affecting psychiatric patients are not made lightly and require an in-depth analysis of anyone involved. Forensic psychiatrists have a background in both the medical aspect of psychiatry as well as the legal aspects of a courtroom.

== Canada ==
=== Criminal law framework ===
Mental Health Acts specify the circumstances under which individuals may be brought against their will to a psychiatric facility for examination or assessment and possible admission. It can be initiated by a physician for psychiatric assessment of the person or examination of the person ordered by a judge, magistrate or justice of the peace

Concerns have been expressed that the Canadian criminal justice system discriminates based on DSM IV diagnosis within the context of Part XX of the Criminal Code. This part sets out provisions for, among other things, court ordered attempts at "treatment" before individuals receive a trial as described in section 672.58 of the Criminal Code. Also provided for are court ordered "psychiatric assessments". Critics have also expressed concerns that use of the DSM-IV-TR may conflict with section 2(b) of the Canadian Charter of Rights and Freedoms, which guarantees the fundamental freedom of "thought, belief, opinion, and expression".

=== Confidentiality ===
The position of the Canadian Psychiatric Association holds, "in recent years, serious incursions have been made by governments, powerful commercial interests, law enforcement agencies, and the courts on the rights of persons to their privacy." It goes on to state, "breaches or potential breaches of confidentiality in the context of therapy seriously jeopardize the quality of the information communicated between patient and psychiatrist and also compromise the mutual trust and confidence necessary for effective therapy to occur."

An outline of the forensic psychiatric process as it occurs in the province of Ontario is presented in the publication The Forensic Mental Health System In Ontario: An Information Guide published by the Centre for Addiction and Mental Health in Toronto. The Guide states: "Whatever you tell a forensic psychiatrist and the other professionals assessing you is not confidential." The Guide further states: "The forensic psychiatrist will report to the court using any available information, such as: police and hospital records, information given by your friends, family or co-workers, observations of you in the hospital." Also according to the Guide: "You have the right to refuse to take part in some or all of the assessment. Sometimes your friends or family members will be asked for information about you. They have the right to refuse to answer questions, too."

Of note, the emphasis in the guide is on the right to refuse participation. This may seem unusual given that a result of a verdict of "Not Criminally Responsible by reason of Mental Disorder" is often portrayed as desirable to the defence, similar to the insanity defense in the United States. A verdict of "Not Criminally Responsible" is referred to as a "defence" by the Criminal Code. However, the issue of the accused's mental state can also be raised by the Crown or by the court itself, rather than solely by the defence counsel, differentiating it from many other legal defences.

=== Treatment/assessment conflict ===
In Ontario, a court-ordered inpatient forensic assessment for criminal responsibility typically involves both treatment and assessment being performed with the accused in the custody of a single multidisciplinary team over a 30- or 60-day period. Concerns have been expressed that an accused may feel compelled on ethical, medical, or legal grounds to divulge information, medical, or otherwise, to assessors in an attempt to allow for and ensure safe and appropriate treatment during that period of custody.

Some Internet references address treatment/assessment conflict as it relates to various justice systems, particularly civil litigation in other jurisdictions. The American Academy Of Psychiatry and the Law states in its ethics guidelines, "when a treatment relationship exists, such as in correctional settings, the usual physician-patient duties apply", which may be seen as contradiction.

== South Africa ==
In South Africa, patients are referred for observation for a period of 30 days by the courts if questions exist as to CST and MSO. Serious crimes require a panel, which may include two or more psychiatrists. Should the courts find the defendant not criminally responsible, the defendant may become a state patient and be admitted in a forensic psychiatric hospital. They are referred to receive treatment for an indefinite period, but most were back in the community after three years.

== Educational requirements ==
A psychiatrist is a medical doctor who has completed undergraduate school, medical school, and residency training. Forensic psychiatrists typically have additional training that is relevant to the job they hold (such as a focus in child/adolescent, geriatric, or addiction). Many forensic psychiatrists will complete a more specific training after their residency in a related area. This training typically lasts another one or two years. Because they have earned a doctorate in medicine (MD), they are able to both diagnose and treat disorders related to a patient's mental state; they are also able to prescribe medication.

== Training standards ==
Some practitioners of forensic psychiatry have taken extra training in that specific area. In the United States, one-year fellowships are offered in this field to psychiatrists who have completed their general psychiatry training. Such psychiatrists may then be eligible to sit for a board certification examination in forensic psychiatry. In Britain, one is required to complete a three-year subspecialty training in forensic psychiatry, after completing one's general psychiatry training, before receiving a Certificate of Completion of Training as a forensic psychiatrist. In some countries, general psychiatrists can practice forensic psychiatry, as well. However, other countries, such as Japan, require a specific certification from the government to do this type of work.

== See also ==
- Forensic psychology
- Daubert v. Merrell Dow Pharmaceuticals, Inc. which established the Daubert standard delimiting the admissibility of scientific expert witness testimony
- Rennie v. Klein - right to refuse treatment
- Kansas v. Hendricks - involuntary civil commitment for sexual predators
- Settled insanity – Condition caused by long-term substance abuse
- Ultimate issue
- Twinkie defense
- Bruneri-Canella case, an early landmark case which introduced new forensic techniques in juridic debate
