= Smith v. State (1980) =

Smith v. State, Supreme Court of Alaska 614 P.2d 300 (1980), is a criminal case which distinguishes between the ALI test and the M'Naghten rule in an insanity defense.
