= Mullaney v. Wilbur =

- Supreme Court of the United States

Argued January 15, 1975 Decided June 9, 1975
- Full case name: Mullaney v. Wilbur
- Citations: 421 U.S. 684 (more) 95 S. Ct. 1881; 44 L. Ed. 2d 508; 1975 U.S. LEXIS 70

Case history
- Prior: On writ of certiorari to the United States Court of Appeals for the First Circuit

Holding
- The Maine rule does not comport with the requirement of the Due Process Clause of the Fourteenth Amendment that the prosecution must prove beyond a reasonable doubt every fact necessary to constitute the crime charged.

Court membership
- Chief Justice Warren E. Burger Associate Justices William O. Douglas · William J. Brennan Jr. Potter Stewart · Byron White; Thurgood Marshall · Harry Blackmun; Lewis F. Powell Jr. · William Rehnquist

Case opinions
- Majority: Powell, joined by unanimous
- Concurrence: Rehnquist, joined by Burger

Mullaney v. Wilbur, 421 U.S. 684 (1975), is a criminal case in which a unanimous court struck down a state statute requiring a defendant to prove the defense of provocation to downgrade a murder conviction to manslaughter. Previous common law, such as in Commonwealth v. York (1845), allowed such burden on the defense.

Maine's statute defined murder as unlawfully killing with malice, with malice defined as deliberate and unprovoked cruelty, and added that killings were presumed to be unprovoked unless the defense proved provocation by a preponderance of the evidence. Justice Powell delivered the opinion for the court that provocation was a crucial part of the charge in that it determined "the degree of culpability attaching to the criminal homicide".

States were able to circumvent this decision by careful wording, as in Patterson v. New York, in which provocation, or "extreme emotional disturbance", was classified as an allowable defense excuse, not as a listed element.

== See also ==
- List of United States Supreme Court cases
- Lists of United States Supreme Court cases by volume
- List of United States Supreme Court cases by the Burger Court
