= United States federal laws governing defendants with mental diseases or defects =

United States federal laws governing offenders with mental diseases or defects (18 U.S.C. §§ 4241–4248) provide for the evaluation and handling of defendants who are suspected of having mental diseases or defects. The laws were completely revamped by the Insanity Defense Reform Act in the wake of the John Hinckley Jr. verdict.

== Incompetence to stand trial ==
A defendant can be found incompetent to stand trial if he is unable to understand the nature and consequences of the proceedings against him and to assist properly in his defense. In such a case, he is involuntarily committed until his competency is restored. The Supreme Court has ruled that the government has a legitimate interest in bringing defendants to trial and that therefore incompetent defendants can be forcibly medicated under certain circumstances. See Sell v. United States. Time served while waiting to be restored to competence generally counts as "dead time," because it is not official detention but rather is (in theory) devoted to treatment. The Supreme Court has ruled that an insanity acquittee can be held indefinitely. Statements made by the defendant in the course of his evaluation cannot be admitted as evidence against him on the issue of guilt.

Between 1940 and 1984, the law provided for a board of examiners to be established for each federal and penal correctional institution that would consist of three medical officers, one appointed by the warden or superintendent of the institution; another by the U.S. Attorney General; and another by the U.S. Public Health Service. The pre-1984 law did not have the same stringent 30- and 45-day time limits for examinations, but merely provided that "For the purpose of the examination the court may order the accused committed for such reasonable period as the court may determine to a suitable hospital or other facility to be designated by the court." The law provided that even if mental competency was not raised as an issue before conviction, if a board of examiners found probable cause to believe the defendant had been incompetent at the time of his trial, the court could vacate the judgment of conviction and grant a new trial.

== Insanity ==
Per Federal Rule of Criminal Procedure 12.2, a defendant intending to pursue an insanity defense must timely notify an attorney for the government in writing. The government then has a right to have the court order a psychiatric or psychological examination. If the defendant does not submit to the examination, the court may exclude any expert evidence from the defendant on the issue of the defendant's mental disease, mental defect, or any other mental condition. Federal law provides for the commitment of those found not guilty only by reason of insanity. Once such a verdict is handed down, the defendant has the burden of proof of showing that his release would not create a substantial risk of bodily injury to another person or serious damage of property of another due to a present mental disease or defect. Because of the difficulty in proving such a thing, in some cases, defendants found not guilty only by reason of insanity serve more time in a mental hospital than they would have served in prison had they been found guilty. A risk panel is typically tasked with making such assessments.

== Persons due for release but suffering from mental disease or defect ==
There is also a provision allowing the hospitalization of a person due for release but suffering from mental disease or defect. If the director of a facility in which a person is hospitalized certifies that a person in the custody of the Bureau of Prisons whose sentence is about to expire, or who has been committed to the custody of the Attorney General due to incompetence, or against whom all criminal charges have been dismissed solely for reasons related to the mental condition of the person, is suffering from a mental disease or defect as a result of which his release would create a substantial risk of bodily injury to another person or serious damage to property of another, and that suitable arrangements for State custody and care of the person are not available, the court will hold a hearing on the matter. If it finds by clear and convincing evidence that the person is indeed presently suffering from a mental disease or defect as a result of which his release would create a substantial risk of bodily injury to another person or serious damage to property of another, then it can hold him until such time as his condition has sufficiently improved. When proceedings are initiated under this act, the person is entitled to an adversarial hearing with the right to counsel, the opportunity to testify, to present evidence, subpoena witnesses, and confront and cross-examine witnesses.

== Sexually dangerous offenders ==
The 2006 Adam Walsh Child Protection and Safety Act has been codified as 18 U.S.C. § 4248. It allows a person deemed "sexually dangerous" to be civilly committed after the expiration of a federal criminal sentence. The U.S. Court of Appeals for the First Circuit found that civil commitments were within the power granted to Congress under the Constitution's Necessary and Proper Clause as an extension of the government's custodial responsibility for federal inmates. The provision of indefinite holding of prisoners after the expiration of their terms was ruled constitutional in 2010 in United States v. Comstock.
