= Justification and excuse =

Justification and excuse are different defenses in criminal cases in the United States. Both defenses admit that the defendant committed an act proscribed by law. The proscribed act has justification if the act had positive effects that outweigh its negative effects, or is not wrong or blameworthy. The proscribed act is excused if the defendant's violation was not entirely voluntary, such as if they acted under duress or under a false belief. Martin v. Ohio (1986) established that states may make justification an affirmative defense, placing the burden of proof on defendant. Patterson v. New York (1977) established that states may make excuses, such as involving mental state, an affirmative defense, rather than part of the mens rea element the prosecution must prove beyond a reasonable doubt.

"Conduct... may be either justified... or excused... A defense of justification is the product of society's determination that the actual existence of certain circumstances will operate to make proper and legal what otherwise would be criminal conduct. A defense of excuse, contrarily, does not make legal and proper conduct which ordinarily would result in criminal liability; instead, it openly recognizes the criminality of the conduct but excuses it because the actor believed that circumstances actually existed which would justify his conduct when in fact they did not. In short, had the facts been as he supposed them to be, the actor's conduct would have been justified rather than excused..."

An example is that breaking into someone's home during a fire in order to rescue a child inside, is justified. If the same act is done in the reasonable but mistaken belief that there was a fire, then the act is excused.

What is justified under a utilitarian perspective might be excused under a retributivist standpoint, and vice versa. The American Law Institute Model Penal Code expresses "skepticism that any fine line can be drawn states a fine line between justification and excuse can sensibly be drawn... To say someone's conduct is 'justified' ordinarily connotes that the conduct is thought to be right, or at least not undesirable; to say that someone's conduct is 'excused' ordinarily connotes that the conduct is thought to be undesirable but for some reason the actor is not to be blamed for it."
