= Dawkins v. State =

US legal case

Dawkins v. State, 252 P.3d 214 (Okla. 2011), is a legal case involving limitations on the right of self-defense and stand-your-ground laws. The court determined that stand your ground laws do not justify use of deadly force, if defendant is engaged in other unlawful activity at the time. The case involved a defendant with a right to lawfully protect where he stood, but who used an illegal weapon with deadly force to stand his ground.

The court wrote:

"[T]he 'stand your ground' law... provide[s] that a person has a right to expect absolute safety in a place they have a right to be, and may use deadly force to repel an intruder... for a person to be justified in using deadly force, the person must not be 'engaged in unlawful activity".
