= Insanity Defense Reform Act =

US forensic pathology-related Congress Act of 1984

The Insanity Defense Reform Act of 1984 (IDRA) was signed into law by President Ronald Reagan on October 12, 1984, amending the United States federal laws governing defendants with mental diseases or defects to make it significantly more difficult to obtain a verdict of not guilty only by reason of insanity.

== Act ==
The act removed the volitional component, that a defendant lacked capacity to conform their conduct to the law, from the ALI test. Defendants were exculpated only if "at the time of the commission of the acts constituting the offense, ... as the result of a severe mental disease or defect, [they were] unable to appreciate the nature and quality or wrongfulness of [their] acts." The law passed in the wake of public outrage after John Hinckley Jr.'s acquittal by reason of insanity in June 1982 for his attempted assassination of President Ronald Reagan.

Prior to the enactment of the law, the federal standard for "insanity" was that the government had to prove a defendant's sanity beyond a reasonable doubt (assuming the insanity defense was raised). Following the Act's enactment, the defendant has the burden of proving insanity by "clear and convincing evidence". Furthermore, expert witnesses for either side are prohibited from testifying directly as to whether the defendant was legally sane or not, but can only testify as to their mental health and capacities, with the question of sanity itself to be decided by the finder-of-fact at trial. The Act was held to be constitutional (and the change in standards and burdens of proof are discussed) in United States v. Freeman.

The Defense Reform Act was criticized by psychologist Lawrence Z. Freedman for being ineffective: "If the attacker is rational mentally, stable emotionally, and fanatic politically, he will not be deterred. Nor will an irrational, affectively disturbed individual be deterred."
