= State v. Pike =

United States criminal case

State v. Pike, 49 N.H. 399 (1870), is a criminal case which articulated a product test for an insanity defense. The court in Durham v. United States used it as the basis for what came to be known as the Durham rule.
