= Newton v. Rumery =

- Supreme Court of the United States

Decided March 9, 1987
- Full case name: Newton v. Rumery
- Citations: 480 U.S. 386 (more)

Holding
- The prosecutor may offer a plea bargain to a defendant in exchange for the defendant's promise not to sue the state under Section 1983, and that contract may be enforceable.

Court membership
- Chief Justice William Rehnquist Associate Justices William J. Brennan Jr. · Byron White; Thurgood Marshall · Harry Blackmun; Lewis F. Powell Jr. · John P. Stevens; Sandra Day O'Connor · Antonin Scalia

Case opinions
- Majority: Powell (all but Part III-B), joined by Rehnquist, White, Scalia, O'Connor
- Plurality: Powell (Part III-B), joined by Rehnquist, White, Scalia
- Concurrence: O'Connor
- Dissent: Stevens, joined by Brennan, Marshall, Blackmun

Newton v. Rumery, 480 U.S. 386 (1987), was a United States Supreme Court case in which the court held that the prosecutor may offer a plea bargain to a defendant in exchange for the defendant's promise not to sue the state under Section 1983, and that contract may be enforceable. Not all of these agreements are enforceable.

== Background ==
After learning that a friend, David Champy, had been indicted by a New Hampshire county grand jury for aggravated felonious sexual assault, Rumery sought more information from a mutual acquaintance, who coincidentally was the victim of the assault and was expected to be the principal witness against Champy. The victim called the town of Newton's Chief of Police and told him that Rumery was trying to force her to drop the charges against Champy. Ultimately, Rumery was arrested and accused of the state law felony of tampering with a witness. Rumery's attorney and the prosecutor negotiated an agreement whereby the prosecutor would dismiss the charges against him if he would agree to release any claims he might have against the town, its officials, or the victim for any harm caused by his arrest. Three days later, Rumery signed the "release-dismissal agreement," and the criminal charges against him were dropped.

Ten months later, he filed this action under 42 U.S.C. § 1983 in federal District Court, alleging that the town and its officers had violated his constitutional rights by arresting him, defaming him, and imprisoning him falsely. The suit was dismissed on the basis of the assertion by the defendants (including Newton) of the release-dismissal agreement as an affirmative defense. The court rejected respondent's argument that the agreement was unenforceable because it violated public policy, and concluded that a release of claims under § 1983 was valid if, as here, it resulted from a decision that was voluntary, deliberate, and informed. The First Circuit Court of Appeals reversed, adopting a per se rule invalidating release-dismissal agreements.

== Opinion of the court ==
The Supreme Court issued an opinion on March 9, 1987. O'Connor's fifth vote in favor of upholding release-dismissal agreements—with different reasoning—means her concurrence is used to determine the enforceability of these agreements.

== Later developments ==
Release-dismissal agreements have continued to be used, and with conditions other than holding the state harmless for wrongdoing. One high-profile example is the offer of resignation in lieu of prosecution that federal prosecutors offer to political officials. These agreement may include a promise not to run for office in the future. Although these particular agreements have not always been upheld, the official manual for professional prosecutors promulgated by the Attorney General continues to encourage prosecutors to seek voluntary resignations via the plea-bargaining process.
