= Commonwealth v. York =

- Court: Supreme Judicial Court of Massachusetts
- Full case name: Commonwealth v. Peter York
- Decided: March 1, 1845
- Citations: 50 Mass. 93; 9 Metcalf 93; 43 Am. Dec. 373

Case opinions
- Decision by: Lemuel Shaw
- Dissent: Samuel Wilde

Commonwealth v. York, 50 Mass. (9 Metcalf) 93 (1845), is a precedent-setting American criminal case that established the principle that although the prosecution must prove all elements of a crime beyond a reasonable doubt, the defendant bears the burden of proving the defense of provocation, which pertains to the defendant's mental state. This ruling was consistent with Blackstone's Commentaries, which held that prosecution must prove the defendant committed a criminal act, and the defendant must then prove "circumstances of justification, excuse and alleviation". However, in federal courts, but not state all courts, this precedent was later modified by Davis v. United States (1895), which established the presumption of innocence regarding a defendant's mental state of being "legally capable of committing crime".
