= United States v. Brawner =

1972 Supreme Court case on insanity pleas

- Court: United States Court of Appeals for the District of Columbia Circuit
- Full case name: United States v. Archie W. Brawner
- Argued: April 12, 1972
- Decided: June 23, 1972
- Citations: 471 F.2d 969; 153 U.S. App. D.C. 1

Case history
- Subsequent history: Rehearing denied, August 21, 1972.

Court membership
- Judges sitting: David L. Bazelon, James Skelly Wright, Carl E. McGowan, Edward Allen Tamm, Harold Leventhal, Spottswood William Robinson III, George MacKinnon, Roger Robb, Malcolm Richard Wilkey (en banc)

Case opinions
- Majority: Leventhal, joined by Wright, McGowan, Tamm, Robinson, MacKinnon, Robb, Wilkey
- Concur/dissent: Bazelon

United States v. Brawner, 471 F.2d 969 (D.C. Cir. 1972), is decision by the United States Court of Appeals for the District of Columbia Circuit in which the Court held that a person is not responsible for criminal conduct if at the time of such conduct as a result of mental disease or defect, he lacked substantial capacity either to appreciate the criminality of his conduct or conform his conduct to the requirements of the law.

The case overturned the Durham rule for determining whether a defendant was not guilty by reason of insanity. The Court ruled that the primary reason they were departing from the old test of insanity is that it put substantial dominance on the testimony of experts. The Court exhaustively examined the justification for the defense of insanity and the need to guide the jury with a specific framework for the insanity defense. The American Law Institute provided a better framework in the majority's opinion because it took part of the reliance on experts away and focused on the acts and mental state of a defendant at the time he committed the acts constituting the crime. It proposed a rule that was adopted as the American Law Institute Model Penal Code rule (ALI rule).
