= United States v. Dunn =

- Supreme Court of the United States

Argued January 20, 1987 Decided March 3, 1987
- Full case name: United States v. Dunn
- Citations: 480 U.S. 294 (more) 107 S. Ct. 1134; 94 L. Ed. 2d 326; 1987 U.S. LEXIS 1057

Holding
- The area near the barn is not within the curtilage of the house for Fourth Amendment purposes.

Court membership
- Chief Justice William Rehnquist Associate Justices William J. Brennan Jr. · Byron White; Thurgood Marshall · Harry Blackmun; Lewis F. Powell Jr. · John P. Stevens; Sandra Day O'Connor · Antonin Scalia

Case opinions
- Majority: White, joined by Rehnquist, Blackmun, Powell, Stevens, O'Connor; Scalia (except paragraph 3 of part II)
- Concurrence: Scalia
- Dissent: Brennan, joined by Marshall

Laws applied
- U.S. Const. amend. IV

United States v. Dunn, 480 U.S. 294 (1987), is a U.S. Supreme Court decision relating to the open fields doctrine limiting the Fourth Amendment of the U.S. Constitution.

== Background ==
Drug Enforcement Agents began investigating the defendant when he purchased large quantities of chemicals used in the production of illegal drugs. The officers then witnessed the defendant placing these chemicals in a barn on his private ranch. The ranch was completely encircled by a perimeter fence, and contained several interior barbed wire fences, including one around the house approximately 50 yards (46 m) from the barn, and a wooden fence enclosing the front of the barn, which had an open overhang and locked, waist-high gates. Without a warrant, officers crossed the perimeter fence, several of the barbed wire fences, and the wooden fence in front of the barn. They were led there by the smell of chemicals, and, while there, could hear a motor running inside. They did not enter the barn but stopped at the locked gate and shined a flashlight inside, observing what they took to be a drug laboratory. They then left the ranch, but entered it twice the next day to confirm the laboratory's presence.

They obtained a search warrant and executed it. The equipment was feeding off the mains. The DEA arrested the respondent, seizing chemicals and equipment, as well as bags of amphetamines they discovered in the house. After the District Court denied the defendant’s motion to suppress all evidence seized pursuant to the warrant and the defendant was convicted of conspiracy to manufacture controlled substances and related offenses. However, the Court of Appeals reversed that decision, holding that the barn was within the residence's curtilage and therefore within the Fourth Amendment's protective ambit.

== Opinion of the Court ==
In an opinion for the majority by Justice White, the Supreme Court overturned the appeals court’s decision by finding that the barn was outside the curtilage and all evidence obtained by the officers while standing outside the barn and looking in was admissible. Looking at whether the barn was inside the curtilage or rather in an open field, the Court stated:

[C]urtilage questions should be resolved with particular reference to four factors: the proximity of the area claimed to be curtilage to the home, whether the area is included within an enclosure surrounding the home, the nature of the uses to which the area is put, and the steps taken by the resident to protect the area from observation by people passing by. We do not suggest that combining these factors produces a finely tuned formula that, when mechanically applied, yields a "correct" answer to all extent-of-curtilage questions. Rather, these factors are useful analytical tools only to the degree that, in any given case, they bear upon the centrally relevant consideration — whether the area in question is so intimately tied to the home itself that it should be placed under the home's "umbrella" of Fourth Amendment protection. Applying these factors to respondent's barn and to the area immediately surrounding it, we have little difficulty in concluding that this area lay outside the curtilage of the ranch house."

== See also ==
- List of United States Supreme Court cases, volume 480
- List of United States Supreme Court cases
- Lists of United States Supreme Court cases by volume
- List of United States Supreme Court cases by the Rehnquist Court
