= Archuleta v. Hedrick =

US Federal court case

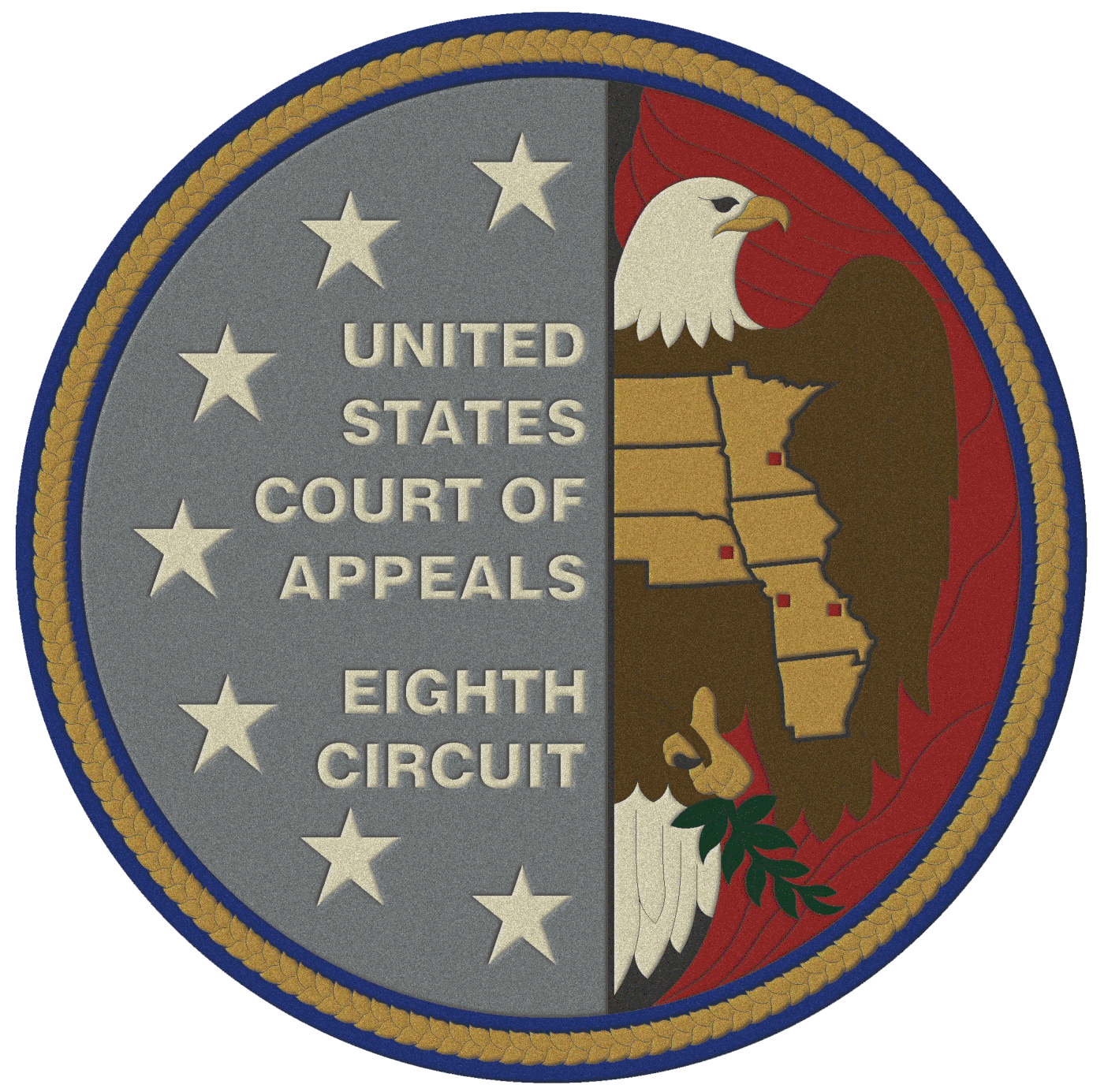
- Court: United States Court of Appeals for the Eighth Circuit
- Full case name: Benjamin Archuleta v. Bill Hedrick, Warden; United States of America
- Argued: November 18, 2003
- Decided: April 23, 2004
- Citation: 365 F.3d 644 (8th Cir. 2004)

Court membership
- Judges sitting: James B. Loken, Theodore McMillian, C. Arlen Beam

Case opinions
- Majority: Loken, joined by McMillian, Beam

Laws applied
- Eighth Amendment

Archuleta v. Hedrick, 365 F.3d 644 (8th Cir. 2004) was a pro se petition for a writ of habeas corpus filed in the U.S. Court of Appeals for the Eighth Circuit in October 2002, appealing the dismissal of a case brought by defendant Benjamin Archuleta. Archuleta had been found not guilty by reason of insanity of assault and subsequently ordered to be confined in a prison mental hospital by the United States District Court for the Western District of Missouri after his successful insanity defense, as he was evaluated by a psychiatrist as dangerous. His appeal challenged this confinement and "forced treatment", requested a withdrawal of his original insanity defense, and sought his unconditional release from custody.

The appellate court reversed the lower court's dismissal of the habeas corpus petition, saying that habeas corpus is a last resort remedy available to those without any other, and the case was remanded back to that court with the instructions to transfer the petition to another district court, the United States District Court for the District of Utah.

== Facts of case ==
Benjamin Archuleta was charged with assaulting a federal official and found not guilty by reason of insanity (NGRI) in the United States District Court for the District of Utah on July 23, 1999. Based on a psychiatric evaluation and the testimony of others, the court ruled that Archuleta's release posed a substantial risk of harm to others and ordered him committed to the United States Medical Center for Federal Prisoners in Springfield, Missouri. Although later Archuleta was conditionally released, his release was revoked on July 8, 2002 and he was recommitted to FMC Springfield until the time he was determined to be eligible for a conditional release by the hospital; such release would be under court supervision.

Archuleta filed a pro se petition (a petition to represent himself) for habeas corpus relief (seeking relief for unlawful detention) in the U.S. Court of Appeals for the Western District of Missouri in October, 2002, requesting an unconditional discharge and release from confinement in the prison hospital. He argued that the statute under which he was committed is unconstitutional because only a judicial unit, not an administrative one, can determine the length and conditions of his sentence and also whether his confinement after his successful NGRI defense could exceed the sentence he would have received if found guilty under the law. He further argued that his confinement in the prison facility far from the court was equal to "banishment and exile" and that "forced treatment" violated the Eighth Amendment. He also contested the finding that he had violated the terms of his conditional release, saying that he did not refuse the forced treatment "but for the exception of being late on taking his [anti-psychotic] medication... one day". He also requested to withdraw his insanity defense.

At the district court level, the counsel for both parties agreed to court’s interpretation of the pro se petition to focus on the issue of the involuntary administration of psychiatric medication.

== Decision ==
The appellate court ruled that although Archuleta's post-acquittal confinement was constitutional under statute 18 U.S.C. § 4243, it decided to consider the unlawful detention question broadly as "substantial public interests are involved", as habeas corpus is a remedy available when no other is available. It ruled the lower court erred in overlooking the seriousness of the grievance, as the statute under which Archuleta was committed for involuntary treatment did not prevent him "from establishing by writ of habeas corpus the illegality of his detention". Some issues, such as whether an insanity defense can be withdrawn upon appeal, have not been settled.

The court vacated the dismissal order and remanded the case back to the district court, instructing that court to transfer the case to the U.S. District Court for the District of Utah, pursuant to 28 U.S.C. § 1406(a), a statute which provides that the appellate court in which a case is wrongly filed may either dismiss it, or in the interest of justice, transfer the case to any district in which it could have been brought.
