= Martin v. Ohio =

- Supreme Court of the United States

Argued December 2, 1986 Decided February 25, 1987
- Full case name: Earline Martin, Petitioner v. Ohio
- Docket no.: 85-6461
- Citations: 480 U.S. 228 (more) 107 S. Ct. 1098; 94 L. Ed. 2d 267; 1987 U.S. LEXIS 933

Holding
- Neither Ohio law violated the Due Process Clause of the Fourteenth Amendment by shifting to petitioner the State's burden of proving the elements of the crime.

Court membership
- Chief Justice William Rehnquist Associate Justices William J. Brennan Jr. · Byron White; Thurgood Marshall · Harry Blackmun; Lewis F. Powell Jr. · John P. Stevens; Sandra Day O'Connor · Antonin Scalia

Case opinions
- Majority: White, joined by Rehnquist, Stevens, O'Connor, Scalia
- Dissent: Powell, joined by Brennan, Marshall (in full); Blackmun (as to Parts I and III)

Martin v. Ohio, 480 U.S. 228 (1987), is a criminal case in which the United States Supreme Court held that the presumption of innocence requiring prosecution to prove each element of a crime beyond a reasonable doubt only applies to elements of the offense, and does not extend to the defense of justification, whereby states could legislate a burden on the defense to prove justification. The decision was split 5–4. The decision does not preclude states from requiring such a burden on the prosecution in their laws.

== See also ==
- List of United States Supreme Court cases
- Lists of United States Supreme Court cases by volume
- List of United States Supreme Court cases by the Rehnquist Court
