= Murder of Generro Sanchez =

2012 death in Asher, Oklahoma

- Date: December 5, 2012; 13 years ago
- Location: Asher, Oklahoma, U.S.; 35.0657°N 96.9400°W
- Type: Murder, shooting
- Motive: Schizoaffective disorder, homicidal ideation
- Target: Generro Sanchez
- Perpetrator: Jerrod Murray
- Charges: First-degree murder
- Verdict: Not guilty by reason of insanity
- Sentence: Indefinite custody at mental health facility

On December 5, 2012, Generro Sanchez was murdered in Asher, Oklahoma, United States, by Jerrod Murray, a fellow student at East Central University. While Sanchez was giving Murray a ride to Walmart, Murray pulled a gun on him and fired a total of three rounds, the first missing and the other two hitting him in the head. Murray was charged with first-degree murder and found not guilty by reason of insanity.

== Background ==
Generro Sanchez and Jerrod Murray (born July 20, 1994; 32 years ago) were both freshman students at East Central University. Murray revealed to investigators that he had been planning to kill someone for weeks before the murder, simply to know what it felt like. He selected Sanchez as his victim.

== Murder ==
On December 5, 2012, Murray convinced Sanchez to give him a ride to Walmart in exchange for $20. Once they arrived in the Walmart parking lot, Murray pulled out a .40-caliber Springfield handgun, stolen from Asher resident Daniel Davis. He ordered Sanchez to drive north of Asher. Sanchez panicked; to ease his mind, Murray unloaded the weapon and placed the magazine in Sanchez's lap. However, unbeknownst to Sanchez, Murray had another magazine in his pocket, which he pulled out and placed on his own lap.

They arrived on Substation Road, where Murray quickly loaded the weapon and fired two rounds at Sanchez; the first missed, the second struck him in the head. The vehicle drifted off the road and struck a tree in a ditch. Murray exited the vehicle and dragged Sanchez out of the driver's seat to the ground, where he was still breathing. Murray fired another round into his head, killing him. He proceeded to cover the corpse with dirt, leaves, and a single stick.

A driver on the same road pulled over and spoke with Murray, who said he had run off the side of the road and needed help getting his truck out of the ditch. The driver gave Murray a ride to his grandparents' house, where he called his roommate for help. The roommate called his own parents, but they did not answer. Murray walked to his roommate's parents' house, where he asked for a can of WD-40, hoping he could use it to remove his fingerprints from the crime scene.

Murray, with the WD-40, was given a ride to an abandoned house near the crime scene by his roommate's father. From there he walked towards the victim's truck, cutting through a woodlot south of Substation Road. As he got closer to the scene, a cough alerted him to someone's presence; he believed the cough sounded like the man who had given him a ride earlier. As it turned out, the man had examined the scene further, discovered Sanchez's body, and called the police to report a gunshot victim.

Murray walked east towards US-177 and tried to hitchhike to Canada. Mistaking a Pottawatomie County Sheriff Department vehicle for an ordinary car, Murray flagged it down. Undersheriff Travis Palmer took him into custody, and Murray immediately confessed to the murder.

== Aftermath ==
Murray was found not guilty by reason of insanity. In August 2015, he was involuntarily committed to inpatient treatment at a state medical facility in Vinita, Oklahoma. He was approved to leave the facility for day treatment in 2022.

The case prompted the Oklahoma Legislature to modify the rules regarding the insanity defense. Senate Bill 1214, signed into law in 2016, created a new verdict of "guilty with mental defect" in addition to "not guilty by reason of mental illness". The new verdict enables courts to impose criminal sentences on mentally ill offenders.
