= Asahi Metal Industry Co. v. Superior Court =

- Supreme Court of the United States

Argued November 5, 1986 Decided February 24, 1987
- Full case name: Asahi Metal Industry Company, Ltd. v. Superior Court of California, Solano County (Cheng Shin Rubber Industrial Company, Ltd., Real Party in Interest)
- Citations: 480 U.S. 102 (more) 107 S. Ct. 1026; 94 L. Ed. 2d 92; 1987 U.S. LEXIS 555; 55 U.S.L.W. 4197; Prod. Liab. Rep. (CCH) ¶ 11,267

Holding
- Considering the international context, the heavy burden on the alien defendant, and the slight interests of the plaintiff and the forum State, the exercise of personal jurisdiction by a California court over Asahi in this instance would be unreasonable and unfair.

Court membership
- Chief Justice William Rehnquist Associate Justices William J. Brennan Jr. · Byron White; Thurgood Marshall · Harry Blackmun; Lewis F. Powell Jr. · John P. Stevens; Sandra Day O'Connor · Antonin Scalia

Case opinions
- Majority: O'Connor, joined by unanimous court (part I); Rehnquist, Brennan, White, Marshall, Blackmun, Powell, Stevens (part II-B)
- Concurrence: O'Connor (parts II-A, III), joined by Rehnquist, Powell, Scalia
- Concurrence: Brennan, joined by White, Marshall, Blackmun
- Concurrence: Stevens, joined by White, Blackmun

Laws applied
- U.S. Const. amend. XIV

Asahi Metal Industry Co. v. Superior Court, 480 U.S. 102 (1987), decided on February 24, 1987, was a case decided by the United States Supreme Court, in which the court decided whether a foreign corporation, by merely being aware that its products could end up in the forum state and into the American "stream of commerce" which later caused injuries, satisfied the minimum contact necessary to satisfy jurisdictional due process requirements. The court was unanimous in the result, but issued a fractured decision with Associate Justice Sandra Day O'Connor writing for a plurality of the court.

== Facts ==
Asahi Metal Industry Co. was an international corporation based in Japan, which manufactured a valve used in the manufacture of motorcycle wheels. These valves were bought by Cheng Shin Rubber Industrial Co., a Taiwanese distributor. One of these valves was alleged to have failed, causing an accident in California. As a result of the accident the driver of the motorcycle sustained serious injuries and his wife, who was riding on the motorcycle as a passenger, was killed. The accident victim sued Cheng Shin in a California state court, and Cheng Shin in turn filed a third-party complaint (impleader) seeking indemnification from Asahi. Asahi contested California's personal jurisdiction over Asahi, but the California courts found jurisdiction based on Asahi's alleged awareness of the international distribution of its products. Specifically, Asahi moved to quash Cheng Shin's summons. The California Superior Court denied the motion but the California Court of Appeals issued a writ of mandamus to the state of California telling them to quash the summons. The California Supreme Court reversed this decision, leading Asahi to appeal to the United States Supreme Court.

== Holding ==
The Supreme Court applied a five-factor test in determining whether "traditional notions of fair play" would permit the assertion of personal jurisdiction over a foreign (meaning out-of-state) defendant:

1. What is the burden on the defendant?
2. What are the interests of the forum state in the litigation?
3. What is the interest of the plaintiff in litigating the matter in that state?
4. Does the allowance of jurisdiction serve interstate efficiency?
5. Does the allowance of jurisdiction serve interstate policy interests?

The Court found that in this case, the burden on the defendant was severe based on both the geographic distance and legal dissimilarities between Japan and the United States. Cheng Shin was not a California resident, diminishing California's interest in the case. Cheng Shin also did not show that it would be inconvenienced if the case for indemnification against Asahi were heard in Japan or Taiwan instead of California. Finally, neither interstate efficiency nor interstate policy interests would be served by finding jurisdiction.

Because an assertion of jurisdiction would disturb the "traditional notions of fair play and substantial justice," the decision of the California Supreme Court was reversed and the judgment of California Court of Appeal (California's intermediate appellate court) was effectively reinstated.

== See also ==
- International trade
- Comity
- Trade treaties

== See also ==
- List of United States Supreme Court cases, volume 480
- List of United States Supreme Court cases
- Lists of United States Supreme Court cases by volume
- List of United States Supreme Court cases by the Rehnquist Court
