= Maryland v. Garrison =

- Supreme Court of the United States

Argued November 5, 1986 Decided February 24, 1987
- Full case name: Maryland v. Garrison
- Citations: 480 U.S. 79 (more) 107 S. Ct. 1013; 94 L. Ed. 2d 72; 1987 U.S. LEXIS 559

Holding
- Where police reasonably believed their warrant was valid during a search, execution of the warrant does not violate respondent's Fourth Amendment rights.

Court membership
- Chief Justice William Rehnquist Associate Justices William J. Brennan Jr. · Byron White; Thurgood Marshall · Harry Blackmun; Lewis F. Powell Jr. · John P. Stevens; Sandra Day O'Connor · Antonin Scalia

Case opinions
- Majority: Stevens, joined by Rehnquist, White, Powell, O'Connor, Scalia
- Dissent: Blackmun, joined by Brennan, Marshall

Laws applied
- U.S. Const. amend. IV

Maryland v. Garrison, 480 U.S. 79 (1987), is a United States Supreme Court case dealing with the Fourth Amendment of the United States Constitution and the extent of discretion given to police officers acting in good faith. The Court held that where police reasonably believe their warrant was valid during a search, execution of the warrant does not violate respondent's Fourth Amendment rights.

== Facts ==
The Baltimore Police Department were executing a warrant that said the ‘3rd floor apartment’ intending to search McWebbs apartment, when the police went upstairs they searched the 3rd floor and found drugs and cash. The police, then discovered that the 3rd floor was actually divided into 2 apartments. Up to that point none of the police had realized there were 2 distinct apartments. Garrison brought a 4th Amendment claim because they did not have a warrant to search his apartment, but rather they had a warrant to search McWebbs apartment, and Garrison wanted to use the 4th Amendment to suppress the drug evidence.

== Opinion ==
The Court finds that because the warrant allowed for investigation of the 3rd floor, the officers reasonably relied on the warrant to carry out the search. Therefore the evidence is allowed, and Garrison is not allowed to invoke the 4th Amendment protection.

== See also ==
- List of United States Supreme Court cases
  - Lists of United States Supreme Court cases by volume
  - List of United States Supreme Court cases, volume 480
  - List of United States Supreme Court cases by the Rehnquist Court
