= SAPROF =

The SAPROF (Structured Assessment of PROtective Factors for violence risk) is a structured professional judgment (SPJ) tool developed to assess the protective factors for violence risk in adult offenders. The tool complements other risk assessment and actuarial tools used to assess the risk of future violent behaviour.

== Development ==
SAPROF was developed in the Netherlands in 2007 as an instrument for the structured assessment of protective factors for violence risk. Following the structured professional judgment model, the SAPROF was designed as a positive addition to other SPJ risk assessment tools, such as the HCR-20, which at the time was considered the most widely used tool for structured professional judgement.

Frequent users of the SAPROF in forensic psychiatry state that the instrument can be helpful in formulating treatment goals, justifying stages of treatment, atoning treatment phasing and facilitating risk communication.

Vivienne de Vogel, Corine de Ruiter, Yvonne Bouman and Michiel de Vries Robbé originally developed the SAPROF in Dutch in 2007, later translated to English and German.

The first study demonstrating predictive validity of the SAPROF was published in 2011. A 2023 review including 39 articles with 5,434 subjects from 16 countries found that the SAPROF "showed good interrater reliability and moderate-to-good predictive performance for the absence of recidivism and institutional misconduct".
