= Durham v. United States (1954) =

- Court: United States Court of Appeals for the District of Columbia Circuit
- Full case name: Monte Durham v. United States
- Argued: March 19, 1954
- Decided: July 1, 1954
- Citations: 214 F.2d 862; 94 U.S. App. D.C. 228; 45 A.L.R. 2d 1430

Case history
- Subsequent history: Petition for rehearing en banc denied, September 10, 1954

Court membership
- Judges sitting: Henry White Edgerton, David L. Bazelon, George Thomas Washington

Case opinions
- Majority: Bazelon, joined by a unanimous court

Keywords
- Insanity defense

Durham v. United States, 214 F.2d 862 (D.C. Cir. 1954), is a criminal case articulating what became known as the Durham rule for juries to find a defendant is not guilty by reason of insanity: "an accused is not criminally responsible if his unlawful act was the product of mental disease or mental defect."

It was to enable psychiatrists to "inform the jury of the character of [the defendant's mental disease" so that a jury could be "guided by wider horizons of knowledge concerning mental life" so that juries could make determinations based on expert testimony about the disease. It was patterned on State v. Pike. It was adopted by only two states, for a short time but is still influential on debate over legal insanity. The decision was criticized for leaving a jury with no standard to judge impairment of reason or control, for not defining mental disease, and for leaving the jury dependent on expert testimony.
