= Johnson v. Transportation Agency =

- Supreme Court of the United States

Argued November 12, 1986 Decided March 25, 1987
- Full case name: Paul E. Johnson v. Transportation Agency, Santa Clara County, California, et al.
- Citations: 480 U.S. 616 (more) 107 S. Ct. 1442; 94 L. Ed. 2d 615

Case history
- Prior: Certiorari to the United States Court of Appeals for the Ninth Circuit

Holding
- The Court held that "[t]he Agency appropriately took into account Joyce's sex as one factor in determining that she should be promoted. The Agency's Plan represents a moderate, flexible, case-by-case approach to effecting a gradual improvement in the representation of minorities and women in the Agency's work force, and is fully consistent with Title VII."

Court membership
- Chief Justice William Rehnquist Associate Justices William J. Brennan Jr. · Byron White; Thurgood Marshall · Harry Blackmun; Lewis F. Powell Jr. · John P. Stevens; Sandra Day O'Connor · Antonin Scalia

Case opinions
- Majority: Brennan, joined by Marshall, Blackmun, Powell, Stevens
- Concurrence: Stevens
- Concurrence: O'Connor (in judgment)
- Dissent: White
- Dissent: Scalia, joined by Rehnquist; White (Parts I and II)

Laws applied
- Title VII of the Civil Rights Act of 1964

Johnson v. Transportation Agency, 480 U.S. 616 (1987), is the only United States Supreme Court case to address a sex-based affirmative action plan in the employment context. The case was brought by Paul Johnson, a male Santa Clara County Transportation Agency employee, who was passed over for a promotion in favor of Diane Joyce, a female employee who Johnson argued was less qualified. The Court found that the plan did not violate the protection against discrimination on the basis of sex in Title VII of the Civil Rights Act of 1964.

== Context ==
Sex-based affirmative action refers to policies adopted by employers and educational institutions that allow for the consideration of sex as one factor in employment actions or university admissions. Because Title VII of the Civil Rights Act of 1964 prohibits discrimination in employment actions on the basis of sex, affirmative action plans must meet the test laid out by the Supreme Court in United Steelworkers v. Weber (1979). In the context of sex-based affirmative action, the Weber test requires that the plan must be aimed at "eliminat[ing] manifest . . . imbalances in traditionally segregated job categories." Furthermore, the plan must not "unnecessarily trammel the interests of" male employees. Finally, the plan must be temporary.

=== Arguments in favor of sex-based affirmative action ===
Supporters of affirmative action for women justify the need for such plans on the basis of historical discrimination and lack of opportunity for women in many traditionally male-dominated fields. Under a substantive equality framework, affirmative action for women is a way of acknowledging that men and women are not always similarly situated with respect to employment because of women's historical exclusion from traditionally male occupations. By this way of thinking, affirmative action can help level the playing field for women trying to break into a male-dominated field. Some supporters argue that affirmative action is essential because studies show women are frequently perceived as being less qualified than their peers, even when they are equally qualified.

=== Arguments against sex-based affirmative action ===
Opponents of affirmative action for women argue that affirmative action plans legalize reverse discrimination by favoring less qualified women. Another argument is that affirmative action plans are not necessary because discrimination on the basis of sex is prohibited by federal law. Still others argue that affirmative action plans harm the intended beneficiaries by tagging them as less competent than their peers.

=== Impact of sex-based affirmative action plans ===
Studies show that the American public is more supportive of sex-based affirmative action than race-based affirmative action. However, studies also indicate that beneficiaries of affirmative action are viewed negatively by both men and women. Despite this negative perception of affirmative action beneficiaries, other studies indicate that while the beneficiaries of affirmative action, on average, have a lower educational attainment than their peers, those beneficiaries generally have job performance outcomes that are as good as their peers. In terms of benefits to women, a recently reported 30-year longitudinal study of the effect of affirmative action on hiring found that minority women benefited significantly over the entire 30 years of the study. However, while affirmative action plans had a negative effect on white women during the 1970s and 1980s, there was a positive effect for this group during the 1990s.

== Background ==
=== Facts ===
Johnson had worked for the county since 1967, starting as a road yard clerk but ultimately transferring to a position doing road maintenance work. In 1979, Johnson and eleven other county employees applied for an open position as a road dispatcher. One of the other employees was Diane Joyce, the only female applicant for the position. Joyce began working for the county as an account clerk in 1970. She became the first woman to hold a position as a road maintenance worker in 1975.

The Agency had adopted an affirmative-action plan in 1978 that authorized the Agency to consider sex as one factor in promotion decisions where the position was one in which women were significantly underrepresented. The plan did not include quotas, but did have a long term goal of having the proportion of women and minorities in each job classification reflect that of the labor pool.

Both Johnson and Joyce were deemed qualified for the position. Johnson, however, scored two points higher than Joyce on the first interview portion of the application process. After a second interview, Johnson was recommended for the promotion. Joyce was concerned that prior disagreements she had had with two members of the interview panel would negatively affect her evaluation, so she contacted the County's Affirmative Action Office. The Office recommended that Joyce be promoted, based in part on the fact that no women had ever held a position as a road dispatcher.

Johnson filed a complaint with the Equal Employment Opportunity Commission (EEOC) alleging the County had violated Title VII by discriminating against him on the basis of sex. The EEOC issued a right to sue letter and Johnson brought suit in the Northern District of California.

=== Lower Court Decisions ===
The District Court for the Northern District of California held that the Agency's plan was invalid because it was not temporary. The court also held that the Agency had discriminated against Johnson because Joyce's sex was determinative in the promotion decision. The Court of Appeals for the Ninth Circuit reversed, holding that the plan was not invalid merely because it did not have a fixed end date.

== Decision ==
The Supreme Court upheld the Agency's plan by a 6–3 vote. The majority (Brennan, Marshall, Blackmun, Powell, and Stevens) reviewed the Agency's plan under the test laid out in Weber. First, the voluntary affirmative action plan must be aimed at "eliminat[ing] manifest racial [or gender] imbalances in traditionally segregated job categories." Second, the plan must not "unnecessarily trammel the interests of" male employees. In addition, the plan must be temporary.

Under the first prong of the test, the Court found that, for unskilled labor positions, a manifest imbalance could be established by comparing the percentage of women occupying positions in the particular job classification at issue with the percentage of women in the area labor market. Since there were no women employed in the job classification that included road dispatchers, women were vastly underrepresented as compared to the area labor market. Furthermore, the plan did not call for blind hiring of women to match the percentage of women in the area labor pool. Rather, the Agency had authorized the consideration of sex as one factor to be considered in addition to an applicant's qualifications.

As to the second prong of the test, the Court found no infringement on the rights of male employees because the plan did not specify quotas, but only aspirational goals aimed at achieving a more balanced work force. In other words, no positions were set aside specifically for women—all qualified applicants were considered for all open positions. Furthermore, Johnson's rights were not infringed as he did not have a legitimate expectation that he, among all of the qualified applicants, would receive the promotion.

Finally, the Court rejected the District Court's argument that the plan was invalid because it was not temporary. Although the plan had no specific end date, it did specify that the goal was to "attain a balanced workforce, not to maintain one." The Court found that this was sufficient indication of the temporary nature of the plan, stating that fixed end dates were only required if the plan sets aside a specific number or percentage of positions for women. Justice Stevens joined the majority opinion, but also wrote a concurring opinion to make clear that the majority opinion should not be construed as "establish[ing] the permissible outer limits of voluntary" affirmative action plans.

Justice O'Connor concurred in the judgment without joining the majority opinion. O'Connor argued that a public employer's voluntary affirmative action plan should be evaluated using the same test as that used for Equal Protection claims. O'Connor would have required that the employer have "a firm basis for believing that remedial action was required." A firm basis could be found where the statistical representation of the minority group would support a prima facie case of discrimination under Title VII.

Justice Scalia dissented, joined by Justices Rehnquist and White. Scalia criticized the majority for essentially legalizing discrimination:

The Court today completes the process of converting [Title VII] from a guarantee that race or sex will not be the basis for employment determinations, to a guarantee that it often will. Ever so subtly, without even alluding to the last obstacles preserved by earlier opinions that we now push out of our path, we effectively replace the goal of a discrimination-free society with the quite incompatible goal of proportionate representation by race and by sex in the workplace.

Scalia argued that there was no evidence of prior discrimination by the employer in this case, so the goal of the plan could not be achieving the kind of balanced work force that one would expect in the absence of discrimination. Rather, Scalia felt the plan reflected the Agency's determination that "the qualifications and desires of women may fail to match the Agency's Platonic ideal of a work force." In Scalia's opinion, the plan was aimed not at remedying the effects of past discrimination, but rather at changing the broader societal attitudes that influence women's job choices and, in his opinion, affirmative action plans were not an appropriate mechanism for addressing these issues.

== Interpretation by lower courts ==
About two years after Johnson was decided, the Supreme Court held in City of Richmond v. Croson Co. (1989) that race-based affirmative action plans whose constitutionality is challenged under the Equal Protection Clause are subject to strict scrutiny review. However, the Court has yet to hear an Equal Protection challenge to a sex-based affirmative action plan, at least in the employment context.

In the context of equal protection, sex-based classifications are subject to intermediate scrutiny, a lesser standard of review than strict scrutiny, which is applied to race-based classifications. Consequently, there is a circuit split on whether sex based affirmative action plans should be subject to strict scrutiny review or the lesser intermediate scrutiny review. The Sixth Circuit and the Federal Circuit apply strict scrutiny while the Third, Fifth, Ninth, and Eleventh Circuits apply intermediate scrutiny.
