= List of United States Supreme Court cases, volume 480 =

This is a list of all the United States Supreme Court cases from volume 480 of the United States Reports:

Case name	Citation	Date decided
Burlington N.R. Co. v. Woods	480 U.S. 1	1987
Iowa Mut. Ins. Co. v. LaPlante	480 U.S. 9	1987
Comm'r v. Groetzinger	480 U.S. 23	1987
Pennsylvania v. Ritchie	480 U.S. 39	1987
Maryland v. Garrison	480 U.S. 79	1987
Asahi Metal Ind. Co. v. Super. Ct.	480 U.S. 102	1987
Western Air Lines, Inc. v. Bd. of Equalization	480 U.S. 123	1987
Hobbie v. Unemployment Appeals Comm'n	480 U.S. 136	1987
United States v. Paradise	480 U.S. 149	1987
California v. Cabazon Band of Indians	480 U.S. 202	1987
Martin v. Ohio	480 U.S. 228	1987
FCC v. Fla. Power Corp.	480 U.S. 245	1987
Springfield v. Kibbe	480 U.S. 257	1987
Sch. Bd. v. Arline	480 U.S. 273	1987
United States v. Dunn	480 U.S. 294	1987
Arizona v. Hicks	480 U.S. 321	1987
Illinois v. Krull	480 U.S. 340	1987
Stringfellow v. Concerned Neighbors in Action	480 U.S. 370	1987
Newton v. Rumery	480 U.S. 386	1987
INS v. Cardoza-Fonseca	480 U.S. 421	1987
Keystone Bituminous Coal Ass'n v. DeBenedictis	480 U.S. 470	1987
Rodriguez v. United States	480 U.S. 522	1987
Truesdale v. Aiken	480 U.S. 527	1987
Amoco Prod. Co. v. Gambell	480 U.S. 531	1987
Atchison T. & S.F.R. Co. v. Buell	480 U.S. 557	1987
Cal. Coastal Comm'n v. Granite Rock Co.	480 U.S. 572	1987
United States v. Merchant	480 U.S. 615	1987
Johnson v. Transportation Agency	480 U.S. 616	1987
Alaska Airlines, Inc. v. Brock	480 U.S. 678	1987
Missouri v. Blair	480 U.S. 698	1987
Lynaugh v. Petty	480 U.S. 699	1987
United States v. Cherokee Nation	480 U.S. 700	1987
O'Connor v. Ortega	480 U.S. 709	1987
Western Airlines, Inc. v. Teamsters	480 U.S. 1301	1987
