= Patterson v. New York =

- Supreme Court of the United States

Argued March 1, 1977 Decided June 17, 1977
- Full case name: Patterson v. New York
- Citations: 432 U.S. 197 (more) 97 S. Ct. 2319, 53 L. Ed. 2d 281, 1977 U.S. LEXIS 120

Holding
- Shifting the burden of proof for a mitigating circumstance affirmative defense to the defendant does not violate the Due Process Clause of the U.S. Constitution.

Court membership
- Chief Justice Warren E. Burger Associate Justices William J. Brennan Jr. · Potter Stewart; Byron White · Thurgood Marshall; Harry Blackmun · Lewis F. Powell Jr. William Rehnquist · John P. Stevens

Case opinions
- Majority: White, joined by Burger, Stewart, Blackmun, Stevens
- Dissent: Powell, joined by Brennan, Marshall
- Rehnquist took no part in the consideration or decision of the case.

Laws applied
- U.S. Const. Amend. XIV

Patterson v. New York, 432 U.S. 197 (1977), was a legal case heard by the Supreme Court of the United States that stated that the Due Process Clause Fourteenth Amendment did not prevent the burdening of a defendant to prove the affirmative defense of extreme emotional disturbance as defined by law in the state of New York.

The court found that the State of New York had reclassified provocation ("extreme emotional disturbance") as an excuse (an affirmative defense requiring proof by preponderance of the evidence), rather than mens rea, which the prosecution had to prove beyond a reasonable doubt, as was the situation in Mullaney v. Wilbur (1975).

== Background ==
During his brief and unstable marriage, the appellant, Gordon Patterson Jr., became estranged from his wife, Roberta. She resumed an association with John Northrup, a neighbor to whom she had been engaged prior to her marriage to appellant. On December 27, 1970, Patterson borrowed a rifle from an acquaintance and went to the residence of his father-in-law. There, he observed his wife through a window in a state of semiundress in the presence of John Northrup. He entered the house and killed Northrup by shooting him twice in the head.

Patterson was charged with second-degree murder. In New York, there were two elements of that crime: (1) "intent to cause the death of another person" and (2) "causing the death of such person or of a third person." – N.Y. Penal Law. Malice aforethought is not an element of the crime. The State of New York allowed a person accused of murder to raise an affirmative defense that he "acted under the influence of extreme emotional disturbance for which there was a reasonable explanation or excuse."

The New York law required that the defendant in any prosecution for second-degree murder prove by a preponderance of the evidence the affirmative defense of extreme emotional disturbance to reduce the crime to manslaughter.

A trial court jury found Patterson guilty for murder. On appeal, the New York Court of Appeals found the law (and verdict) not to violate Patterson's Constitutional rights as guaranteed under the Due Process Clause of the Fourteenth Amendment.

The case was appealed to the US Supreme Court and was argued March 1, 1977 and decided June 17, 1977

Victor Rubino argued the cause for the appellant. With him on the briefs was Betty Friedlander. John Finnerty argued the cause for the appellee. With him on the brief was Alan Marrus.

== Decision ==
The Supreme Court affirmed and decided that shifting the burden of proof of a mitigating circumstance affirmative defense to the defendant is allowed by the Due Process Clause of the U.S. Constitution.
