= R. v. Chaulk =

R v Chaulk
- Supreme Court of Canada

Hearing: May 29, 30, 1990 Judgment: December 20, 1990
- Full case name: Robert Matthew Chaulk and Francis Darren Morrissette v. Her Majesty The Queen
- Citations: [1990] 3 SCR 1303
- Ruling: Chaulk appeal allowed; new trial ordered

Court membership
- Chief Justice: Brian Dickson; Puisne Justices: Jean Beetz, Willard Estey, William McIntyre, Julien Chouinard, Antonio Lamer, Bertha Wilson, Gerald Le Dain, Gérard La Forest

Reasons given
- Majority: Lamer J, joined by Dickson, La Forest and Cory JJ
- Concurrence: Wilson J
- Concurrence: Gonthier J
- Dissent: McLachlin J, joined by L'Heureux-Dubé J
- Dissent: Sopinka J

Laws applied
- R v Oakes, [1986] 1 SCR 103; R v Whyte, [1988] 2 SCR 3

R. v. Chaulk, [1990] 3 SCR 1303 is a leading decision of the Supreme Court of Canada on the interpretation and constitutionality of section 16(4) of the Criminal Code, which provides for a mental disorder defence. Two accused individuals challenged the section as a violation of their right to the presumption of innocence under section 11(d) of the Charter of Rights and Freedoms ("Charter"). The Court upheld the section and provided a basis on which to interpret the section.

== Background ==
On September 3, 1985, 15-year-old Robert Chaulk and 16-year-old Francis Morrissette burglarized a home in Winnipeg, and then stabbed and bludgeoned its sole occupant to death. One week later, they turned themselves in, making full confessions.

The only defence raised was insanity within the meaning of section 16 of the Criminal Code. Expert evidence was given at trial that Chaulk and Morrissette suffered from a paranoid psychosis which made them believe they had the power to rule the world and that the killing was a necessary means to that end. They believed they were above the ordinary law and thought they had a right to kill the victim because he was "a loser".

They were both convicted of murder by a jury in the Manitoba Court of Queen's Bench, which was upheld on appeal.

The major questions to the Supreme Court were:

1. whether section 16(4) of the Criminal Code, which provides that, "Every one shall, until the contrary is proved, be presumed to be and to have been sane," infringes the presumption of innocence guaranteed in section 11(d) of the Charter and if so, it is justifiable under section 1 of the Charter;
2. whether the meaning of the term "wrong" in section 16(2) of the Code should be restricted to "legally wrong";
3. whether section 16(3) of the Code provides an alternative defence if the conditions of section 16(2) were not met; and
4. whether the trial judge erred in permitting the Crown to split its case by presenting its evidence with respect to the sanity of the accused in rebuttal.

They were convicted of murder, but have appealed the decision on the basis of an error in instruction on the definition of the word "appreciate" and "wrong".

== Opinion of the Court ==
There were three opinions:

- Lamer – with Dickson, La Forest and Cory – held that section 16(4) violated section 11(d) of the Charter, but was saved under section 1. He also held that the judge erred in interpreting the word "wrong" in section 16(4).
- Wilson held that section 16(4) violated 11(d) and was not justified by section 1. She also held that the judge erred in interpreting the word "wrong" and erred in his instructions to the jury regarding the defence.
- Gonthier held that section 16(4) did not violate section 11(d) and that the judge erred in interpreting the word "wrong".

The accused were convicted of first degree murder. The only defence raised at trial was insanity, but this defence was rejected by the jury. The Court of Appeal upheld the conviction. This appeal is to determine (1) whether section 16(4) of the Criminal Code, which provides that, "Every one shall, until the contrary is proved, be presumed to be and to have been sane", infringes the presumption of innocence guaranteed in section 11(d) of the Charter; and, if so, whether section 16(4) is justifiable under section 1 of the Charter; (2) whether the meaning of the word "wrong" in section 16(2) of the Code should be restricted to "legally wrong"; (3) whether section 16(3) of the Code provides an alternative defence if the conditions of section 16(2) were not met; and (4) whether the trial judge erred in permitting the Crown to split its case by presenting its evidence with respect to the sanity of the accused in rebuttal.

== Reasoning ==
Lamer CJC explained that there is a presumption of criminal capacity. For a minor child, the reverse is true. For a child over age 14, the presumption of incapacity is rebuttable. A claim of insanity undermines the voluntariness of either the actus reus or the mens rea. It can also provide an excuse to criminal conduct, where intention is present. The defence can be raised in a number of ways, therefore. For example, the defence can plead insanity to show a lack of capacity to understand right and wrong, or to show a cognitive breakdown leading to an irresistible impulse to act.

The focus is on incapacity to form a mental element – a mentally disordered person does not have the capacity to distinguish between right and wrong.

"Wrong" means more than legally wrong or knowing the law of the land; it means morally wrong as well. This decision overruled Schwartz v R. The test requires that the defence establish that due to the mental illness, the accused could not appreciate that his conduct: "conformed to normal and reasonable standards of society" "breaches a standard of moral conduct" "would be condemned."

Lamer addresses the floodgates question. First, the presence of a mental disorder is required before this analysis is even undertaken. Second, moral standards are not judged on the personal standards of the accused. The mental disorder must inhibit the accused from appreciating society's standards of morality. The accused cannot substitute its own moral code and say that he was acting according to that code.

== Rationale ==
A trial judge must instruct the trier of fact that "appreciate that the act was wrong" means that because of the mental disorder, the accused could not understand or comprehend society's moral condemnation of the conduct.

== Dissent ==
There were two dissenting opinions:

- McLachlin – with L'Heureux-Dubé – held that section 16(4) did not violate section 11(d) of the Charter, and the trial judge did not err in any way.
- Sopinka held that section 16(4) violated section 11(d) but was justifiable under section 1 of the Charter. He also agreed with McLachlin that the judge did not err.

== Aftermath ==
Robert Chaulk was subsequently found not guilty by reason of insanity in a new trial. After four months of treatment, Robert Chaulk was found sane and released.

In 1999, Robert Chaulk was accused of stabbing two of his neighbours to death on New Year's Day.
