= Settled insanity =

Condition caused by long-term substance abuse

Settled insanity is defined as a permanent or "settled" condition caused by long-term substance abuse and differs from the temporary state of intoxication. In some United States jurisdictions, "settled insanity" can be used as a basis for an insanity defense, even though voluntary intoxication cannot, if the "settled insanity" negates one of the required elements of the crime such as malice aforethought. However, U.S. federal and state courts have differed in their interpretations of when the use of "settled insanity" is acceptable as an insanity defense and also over what is included in the concept of "settled insanity".

== History ==
Early English common law recognized "settled insanity" as a complete defense for a person who is a habitual drunk but is not intoxicated at the time of the offense. A complete defense exonerates the accused and is a verdict of not guilty. Thus a person meeting the criteria of "settled insanity" is not considered responsible for his actions. Under the M'Naghten Rules, the first attempt in criminal law to address the issue of a mentally ill defendant, mental illness (or insanity) can be used as a defense if the defendant was unable to understand the criminal nature of his act or was unable to distinguish right from wrong at that time of the offense. The standard for an insanity defense developed by the American Law Institute requires a showing that the defendant's mental illness prevented him from abiding by the law. Traditionally, under English common law intoxication, no matter to what degree, was not considered grounds for excusing the defendant's criminal behavior. However, over the last half century, there has been a movement toward allowing intoxication as evidence admissible in court to help the jury understand the criminal act and perhaps use it as an excuse or a mitigating factor.

Although voluntary intoxication is not considered an excuse for a criminal act, if it can be shown that the defendant was too intoxicated to deliberate or premeditate the wrongful act, (lacking malice aforethought), a defense of diminished capacity, while not excusing the defendant from responsibility for the act, can serve to reduce the charges. Similarly, the plea of temporary insanity (applicable only to charges of murder) can serve to reduce the charges from first degree murder to assault or lessen the sentence if it can be shown that the defendant, due to intoxication, acted without deliberation or reflection (lacking malice aforethought), thus negating specific intent. However, ten states have rejected that specific intent can be negated by voluntary intoxication. Some jurisdictions allow voluntary intoxication in the context of a preexisting mental disorder to qualify for an insanity defense.

== Settled insanity ==
Over time, as United States court ruling have been refining the insanity defense, the concept of "settled insanity" has been evolving. Originally, any form of insanity caused by the voluntary use of drugs was not an eligible defense for a criminal offense. The rationale was that any act that results from voluntary behavior, including the voluntary intake of drugs, is choosing to increase the risk of breaking the law. Most United States jurisdictions now recognize that the long-term voluntary use of an intoxicating substance can cause a stable or "settled insanity" that can serve as a defense to a criminal act, especially if the long-term use exacerbated a preexisting mental condition. For example, the concept of "settled insanity" includes the delirium tremens experienced by alcoholic during alcohol withdrawal, but it excludes temporary insanity of intoxication.

California law recognizes "settled insanity" in the case of long-term use, but it does not recognize the temporary mental state caused by the recent consumption of an intoxicant as a sufficient defense. Moreover, recent rulings have upheld that the insanity need not be permanent to qualify as a defense of "settled insanity". For instance, in a case where a woman with a substance-induced psychosis murdered her mother, expert witnesses testified that the defendant had "personality defects" that predisposed her to psychosis, and that the psychosis was triggered by chronic substance abuse and the resulting nine months of hospitalization. The defendant was found guilty because the court ruled that her insanity was temporary; however, the Supreme Court of California overturned the lower court's guilty finding, ruling not guilty by reason of insanity, and stating that temporary psychosis not caused by an episode of intoxication constitutes settled insanity and qualifies as a complete defense.

In People v. Skinner (1985), the California Supreme Court further specified the criteria for "settled insanity". The person must have a mental illness that is relatively stable over time, not caused solely by the length of time the substance was abused, and it must also meet the legal definition of insanity in that jurisdiction. Therefore, it appears that the court is stating that a threshold condition for the insanity defense exists when there is a permanent impairment caused by chronic substance abuse in a person with a preexisting mental illness unrelated to substance abuse, but aggravated or set off by voluntary intoxication.

However, a 2007 decision by the Colorado Court of Appeals in People v. Grant upheld a lower court ruling that did not allow expert testimony on the defendant's state of mind due to voluntary intoxication, thus ruling out any possibility that the issue of "settled insanity" might be raised.

== Case example ==
In Jervon Lamont Herbin v. Commonwealth of Virginia (1998), Herbin appealed his convictions of malicious wounding, two counts of forcible sodomy, abduction, and attempted rape. At the time of the offenses, Herbin was a long-term guest of the victim's parents and was on crutches due to a gunshot wound received when he tried to enter his mother's house while on crack cocaine a week before. After the victim's parents had left the home, Herbin asked the victim to help him put on his socks. Then he threatened her with a knife and ordered her to take off her clothes. He slashed each of her breasts and stabbed her in the abdomen. Then he committed the sex offenses. The defendant asked the victim about whether the cars had manual or automatic transmission. When the victim told him that the car had a manual transmission, the victim was able to convince Herbin to call paramedics. Herbin pretended to call for assistance and eventually did call paramedics. He first told authorities that she was injured in the kitchen, and then he told the authorities that he was trying to commit suicide and she was injured trying to save him.

At trial, Herbin testified that he felt disturbed that day and had no memory of what happened except seeing the victim sitting in a pool of blood. He also testified to numerous stressors, including the gunshot wound, breaking up with his girlfriend, and recent attempts at suicide. He introduced extensive evidence of a history of physical and sexual abuse, drug abuse, and suicide attempts as well as a lengthy hospitalization. Further, he had attended a sex offender treatment program. On the other hand, Herbin called paramedics and properly recited the address, which had many numbers, and his voice on the 911 tape was controlled and calm. He gave paramedics a version of the events that was inconsistent with the facts and which exculpated him.

Virginia does allow for a drug induced "settled insanity" as a defense to crime. However, Virginia draws a distinction between intoxication and organic brain damage resulting from long term-substance abuse. In order to qualify for this defense, Herbin was required to provide substantial evidence of the presence of a mental disorder and the connection between it and the substance abuse. The term settled insanity refers to a degree of organic brain damage that would cause permanent, or settled, impairment. Herbin provided evidence of recent drug abuse and the victim's mother testified that, the day before, she had provided him with prescription drug, Halcion. No lay witnesses testified that Herbin appeared to be under the influence of any substance that day.

To meet the standard for any kind of insanity, the degree of impairment must be severe:

The first portion of M'Naghten relates to an accused who is psychotic to an extreme degree. It assumes an accused who, because of mental disease, did not know the nature and quality of his act; he simply did not know what he was doing. For example, in crushing the skull of a human being with an iron bar, he believed that he was smashing a glass jar. The latter portion of M'Naghten relates to an accused who knew the nature and quality of his act. He knew what he was doing; he knew that he was crushing the skull of a human being with an iron bar. However, because of mental disease, he did not know that what he was doing was wrong. He believed, for example, that he was carrying out a command from God. White v. Com., 636 S.E.2d 353, 356–7, 272 Va. 619, __ (2006).

The appeals court held that a "settled insanity" defense requires substantial evidence of not only long-term and heavy substance abuse, but convincing evidence of a mental disorder that is caused by long-term substance abuse. In Herbin, the court found that

The weight of authority in this country recognizes an insanity defense that is based on a mental disease or defect produced by long-term substance abuse." Commonwealth v. Herd, 413 Mass. 834, 604 N.E.2d 1294, 1299 (1992). At the same time, "evidence of mere narcotics addiction, standing alone and without other physiological or psychological involvement, raises no issue of such a mental defect or disease as can serve as a basis for the insanity defense." United States v. Lyons, 731 F.2d 243, 245 (5th Cir.1984) (citing cases). Although appellant produced evidence of long-term and severe drug abuse, he did not present any evidence that he was suffering from any mental disease as a result of this drug abuse. See Hooks v. State, 534 So.2d 329, 353 (Ala.Crim.App.1987), aff'd sub nom. Ex parte Hooks, 534 So.2d 371 (Ala.1988). - See more at: http://caselaw.findlaw.com/va-court-of-appeals/1349937.html#sthash.YduwJJE7.dpuf

Although Herbin did provide evidence of substantial drug abuse in the past, he was unable to provide expert witness testimony of any mental disorder. The court held that the substance abuse did not serve as evidence for a "settled insanity" defense alone without the link to a mental disorder. No lay witnesses testified as to any behavior consistent with insanity, even if lay testimony were admissible to establish the insanity defense in Virginia. Also, although Herbin did provide an extensive history of drug and sexual abuse, the court said no evidence showed either of these issues were causes or results of a mental disorder. Therefore, the appeals court upheld his conviction.

== Conclusion ==
In those states allowing a "settled insanity" defense, the expert witness must first determine whether any symptoms of a mental disorder were present at the time of the offense, and if there were, determine if those symptoms were the result of a lasting impairment rather than caused by intoxication no matter how acute. If it can be shown that any existing the mental disorder is lasting or relatively enduring, then the expert must be able to show how the mental illness interfered with the defendant's ability to know the nature and consequences of his/her behavior and know that his/her behavior was wrong, or if it impaired his/her ability to control his/her behavior.

Aggressiveness, memory lapses and other common symptoms resulting from acute intoxication are not sufficient in themselves to excuse criminal acts. Further, not all psychotic reactions caused by substance abuse result in behavior that can be related to the criminal act in a way that can support an insanity defense. The presence of psychosis does not mean that the criminal act was caused by the psychosis. A relationship must be shown to exist between the psychosis and the behavior of the defendant.
