= Durham rule =

Guideline governing legal pleas of insanity

A Durham rule, product test, or product defect rule is a rule in a criminal case by which a jury may determine a defendant is not guilty by reason of insanity because a criminal act was the product of a mental disease. Examples in which such rules were articulated in common law include State v. Pike (1870) and Durham v. United States (1954). In Pike, the Superior Court of Judicature of New Hampshire wrote, "An accused is not criminally responsible if his unlawful act was the product of mental disease or mental defect."The insanity defense plea has been removed in a handful of states and left with the "guilt by insane" verdict. These states include, Montana, Idaho, and Utah.

The Durham rule was abandoned in the case United States v. Brawner, 471 F.2d 969 (1972). After the 1970s, U.S. jurisdictions have tended to not recognize this argument as it places emphasis on "mental disease or defect" and thus on testimony by psychiatrists and is argued to be somewhat ambiguous. The Durham rule was constantly criticized because of its lack of clear definitions and terms. It is said that the problem with the "product test" was that it gave psychiatric and psychological experts too much influence in a decision of insanity and not enough to jurors. Although an expert witness may testify as to their opinion in a trial, judges are reluctant to allow it when the opinion goes to the ultimate issue of a case, i.e. when the opinion alone could decide the outcome of a case. The product test asked expert witnesses to use their judgment in determining whether criminal actions were "'the product' of a mental disease or defect." It is the jury's job to decide whether a defendant's actions were the product of their mental disease or defect. The expert witness' job is to determine whether the defendant possesses a mental disease or defect. Further, often conflicting 'expert witnesses' were put on the witness stand by the prosecution and defense to draw the opposite conclusions regarding the cause of an individual's actions.

== See also ==
- Insanity defense
- ALI rule
- M'Naghten rules
