= Risk panel =

Group of people that determines risk

A risk panel is a group of people that determines risk.

In the field of mental health, a risk panel determines whether a person's mental illness causes them to be too much of a risk to society to be released from involuntary commitment. In the United States, the members of such a risk panel may consist of medical officers appointed by the warden or superintendent of an institution, the U.S. Attorney General, and the United States Public Health Service.

The Food and Drug Administration also has a risk panel. The purpose of this 15-member advisory panel is to educate consumers about the risks and benefits of drugs, devices and vaccines.
