= Dorothy Talbye trial =

1638 Colonial American criminal case

The Dorothy Talbye Trial (d. 1638) is an early American example of execution of a mentally ill woman for murder, at a time when people with severe mental illness were treated the same as ordinary criminals. Talbye was hanged in 1639 for killing her three-year-old daughter. She claimed that God told her to do so. Although Puritan Governor John Winthrop of the Massachusetts Bay Colony considered Talbye to be possessed by Satan, the penalty for murder was necessarily death.

== Circumstances ==
Dorothy Talbye was a respectable member of the church in Salem in the Massachusetts Bay Colony who became increasingly melancholic, with fits of violence. Governor John Winthrop ascribed the woman's despondency to delusions or "trouble of mind", stemming from "falling at difference with her husband, through melancholy or spiritual delusions [ ...so that] she sometimes attempted to kill him, and her children, and herself, by refusing meat, saying it was so revealed to her..." through revelations he believes were from Satan. He described how church members tried to intervene.

However, Talbye did not listen to admonitions by the church elders and was cast out of the church. She failed to appear before the Quarterly Court, as ordered in April 1637, for assaulting her husband. She was ordered to be bound and chained to a post until her behavior changed. In July 1637 she was publicly whipped for other infractions against her husband. Although she seemed to improve for a while, Talbye again fell into a state of despair.

In November 1638, she killed her daughter, Difficulty, by breaking her neck. Talbye freely confessed later to this act and was charged with murder. At her trial Talbye was uncooperative, refusing to speak until Governor Winthrop threatened to pile stones on her chest, at which point she pleaded guilty. She refused to repent at her trial or before her execution. Remaining uncooperative, she actively fought her execution. She removed the cloth covering on her head and put it under the noose to lessen the pain and, even as she was swinging from the noose, she attempted to grab at a ladder to save herself.

== Significance ==
In 1637, American colonial law regarding murder followed English common law, the basis of which was essentially biblical. The Bible said that the punishment for murder was death. Massachusetts law followed Exodus, Leviticus and Numbers, which offered no alternative. Any person killing another in "anger or cruelty of passion" shall be put to death. Massachusetts's common law made no distinction between insanity and criminal behavior. The only legal punishment applicable to Dorothy Talbye was death.

In 1641, the Massachusetts Body of Liberties was written as a first step to developing a body of law for the Massachusetts Bay Colony. It codified the following, giving some allowance for special situations, although it may not have helped Dorothy Talbye: "Children, Idiots, Distracted persons, and all that are strangers, or new comers to our plantation, shall have such allowances and dispensations in any cause whether Criminal or other as religion and reason require."
