= Insanity defense =

Legal concept regarding a defendant's state of mind

The insanity defense, (Note: Historical terms related to the concept include "criminally insane" and "criminal insanity") also known as the mental disorder defense, is an affirmative defense by excuse in a criminal case, arguing that the defendant is not responsible for their actions due to a psychiatric disease at the time of the criminal act. This is contrasted with an excuse of provocation, in which the defendant is responsible, but the responsibility is lessened due to a temporary mental state. It is also contrasted with the justification of self-defense or with the mitigation of imperfect self-defense. The insanity defense is also contrasted with a finding that a defendant cannot stand trial in a criminal case because a mental disease prevents them from effectively assisting counsel, from a civil finding in trusts and estates where a will is nullified because it was made when a mental disorder prevented a testator from recognizing the natural objects of their bounty, and from involuntary civil commitment to a mental institution, when anyone is found to be gravely disabled or to be a danger to themself or to others.

Legal definitions of insanity or mental disorder are varied, and include the M'Naghten Rule, the Durham rule, the 1953 British Royal Commission on Capital Punishment report, the ALI rule (American Legal Institute Model Penal Code rule), and other provisions, often relating to a lack of mens rea ("guilty mind"). In the criminal laws of Australia and Canada, statutory legislation enshrines the M'Naghten Rules, with the terms "defense of mental disorder", "defense of mental illness", or "not criminally responsible by reason of mental disorder" employed. Being incapable of distinguishing right from wrong is one basis for being found to be legally insane as a criminal defense. It originated in the M'Naghten Rule, and has been reinterpreted and modernized through more recent cases, such as People v. Serravo.

In the United Kingdom, Ireland, and the United States, use of the defense is rare. Mitigating factors, including things not eligible for the insanity defense such as intoxication and partial defenses such as diminished capacity and provocation, are used more frequently.

The defense is based on evaluations by forensic mental health professionals with the appropriate test according to the jurisdiction. Their testimony guides the jury, but they are not allowed to testify to the accused's criminal responsibility, as this is a matter for the jury to decide. Similarly, mental health practitioners are restrained from making a judgment on the "ultimate issue"—whether the defendant is insane.

Some jurisdictions require the evaluation to address the defendant's ability to control their behavior at the time of the offense (the volitional limb). A defendant claiming the defense is pleading "not guilty by reason of insanity" (NGRI) or "guilty but insane or mentally ill" in some jurisdictions which, if successful, may result in the defendant being committed to a psychiatric facility for an indeterminate period.

== Non compos mentis ==
Non compos mentis (Latin) is a legal term meaning "not of sound mind". Non compos mentis derives from the Latin non meaning "not", compos meaning "control" or "command", and mentis (genitive singular of mens), meaning "of mind". It is the direct opposite of Compos mentis (of a sound mind).

Although typically used in law, this term can also be used metaphorically or figuratively; e.g. when one is in a confused state, intoxicated, or not of sound mind. The term may be applied when a determination of competency needs to be made by a physician for purposes of obtaining informed consent for treatments and, if necessary, assigning a surrogate to make health care decisions. While the proper sphere for this determination is in a court of law, this is practically, and most frequently, made by physicians in the clinical setting.

In English law, the rule of non compos mentis was most commonly used when the defendant invoked religious or magical explanations for behavior. An example of religious circumstances which prevent an individual from being guilty due to mental defect can be found in Catholic canon law.

== History ==
The concept of defense by insanity has existed since ancient Greece and Rome. During the Roman and Greek eras, insanity was used as a way to help provide a defense for those with mental disorders. However, in colonial America a delusional Dorothy Talbye was hanged in 1638 for murdering her daughter, as at the time Massachusetts's common law made no distinction between insanity (or mental illness) and criminal behavior. Edward II, under English common law, declared that a person was insane if their mental capacity was no more than that of a "wild beast" (in the sense of a dumb animal, rather than being frenzied). The first complete transcript of an insanity trial dates to 1724. It is likely that the insane, like those under 14, were spared trial by ordeal. When that was replaced by trial by jury, members were expected to find the insane guilty but then to refer the case to the king for a royal pardon. From 1500 onwards, juries could acquit the insane, and detention required a separate civil procedure. The Criminal Lunatics Act 1800, passed with retrospective effect following the acquittal of James Hadfield, mandated detention at the regent's pleasure (indefinitely) even for those who, although insane at the time of the offence, were now sane.

The M'Naghten Rules of 1843 were not a codification or definition of insanity but rather the responses of a panel of judges to hypothetical questions posed by Parliament in the wake of Daniel M'Naghten's acquittal for the homicide of Edward Drummond, whom he mistook for British Prime Minister Robert Peel. The rules define the defense as "at the time of committing the act the party accused was labouring under such a defect of reason, from disease of the mind, as not to know the nature and quality of the act he was doing, or as not to know that what he was doing was wrong." The key is that the defendant could not appreciate the nature of their actions during the commission of the crime.

In Ford v. Wainwright 477 U.S. 399 (1986), the US Supreme Court upheld the common law rule that the insane cannot be executed. It further stated that a person under the death penalty is entitled to a competency evaluation and to an evidentiary hearing in court on the question of their competency to be executed. In Wainwright v. Greenfield (1986), the Court ruled that it was fundamentally unfair for the prosecutor to comment during the court proceedings on the petitioner's silence invoked as a result of a Miranda warning. The prosecutor had argued that the respondent's silence after receiving Miranda warnings was evidence of his sanity.

In 2006, the US Supreme Court decided Clark v. Arizona, upholding Arizona's restrictions on the insanity defense.

Kahler v. Kansas, 589 U.S. ___ (2020), is a case in which the US Supreme Court justices ruled that the Eighth and the Fourteenth Amendments of the US Constitution do not require states to adopt the insanity defense in criminal cases that are based on the defendant's ability to recognize right from wrong.

Public opinion on insanity defense varied over time.

== Application ==
The defense of insanity takes different guises in different jurisdictions, and there are differences between legal systems with regard to the availability, definition and burden of proof, as well as the role of judges, juries and medical experts. In jurisdictions where there are jury trials, it is common for the decision about the sanity of an accused to be determined by the jury.

=== Incompetency and mental illness ===
An important distinction to be made is the difference between competency and criminal responsibility. The issue of competency is whether a defendant is able to adequately assist their attorney in preparing a defense, make informed decisions about trial strategy and whether to plead guilty, accept a plea agreement or plead not guilty. This issue is dealt with in UK law as "fitness to plead".

Competency largely deals with the defendant's present condition, while criminal responsibility addresses the condition at the time the crime was committed.

In the United States, a trial in which the insanity defense is invoked typically involves the testimony of psychiatrists or psychologists who will, as expert witnesses, present opinions on the defendant's state of mind at the time of the offense.

Therefore, a person whose mental disorder is not in dispute is determined to be sane if the court decides that despite a "mental illness" the defendant was responsible for the acts committed and will be treated in court as a normal defendant. If the person has a mental illness and it is determined that the mental illness interfered with the person's ability to determine right from wrong (and other associated criteria a jurisdiction may have) and if the person is willing to plead guilty or is proven guilty in a court of law, some jurisdictions have an alternative option known as either a guilty but mentally ill (GBMI) or a guilty but insane verdict. The GBMI verdict is available as an alternative to, rather than in lieu of, a "not guilty by reason of insanity" verdict. Michigan (1975) was the first state to create a GBMI verdict, after two prisoners released after being found NGRI committed violent crimes within a year of release, one raping two women and the other killing his wife.

=== Temporary insanity ===
The notion of temporary insanity argues that a defendant was insane during the commission of a crime, but they later regained their sanity after the criminal act was carried out. This legal defense developed in the 19th century and became especially associated with the defense of individuals committing crimes of passion. The defense was first successfully used by U.S. Congressman Daniel Sickles of New York in 1859 after he had killed his wife's lover, Philip Barton Key II. The temporary insanity defense was unsuccessfully pleaded by Charles J. Guiteau who assassinated president James A. Garfield in 1881.

=== Mitigating factors and diminished capacity ===
The United States Supreme Court (in Penry v. Lynaugh) and the United States Court of Appeals for the Fifth Circuit (in Bigby v. Dretke) have been clear in their decisions that jury instructions in death penalty cases that do not ask about mitigating factors regarding the defendant's mental health violate the defendant's Eighth Amendment rights, saying that the jury is to be instructed to consider mitigating factors when answering unrelated questions. This ruling suggests specific explanations to the jury are necessary to weigh mitigating factors.

Diminished responsibility or diminished capacity can be employed as a mitigating factor or partial defense to crimes. In the United States, diminished capacity is applicable to more circumstances than the insanity defense. The Homicide Act 1957 is the statutory basis for the defense of diminished responsibility in England and Wales, whereas in Scotland it is a product of case law. The number of findings of diminished responsibility has been matched by a fall in unfitness to plead and insanity findings. A plea of diminished capacity is different from a plea of insanity in that "reason of insanity" is a full defense while "diminished capacity" is merely a plea to a lesser crime.

=== Intoxication ===
Depending on jurisdiction, circumstances and crime, intoxication may be a defense, a mitigating factor or an aggravating factor. However, most jurisdictions differentiate between voluntary intoxication and involuntary intoxication. In some cases, intoxication (usually involuntary intoxication) may be covered by the insanity defense.

=== Withdrawal or refusal of defense ===
Several cases have ruled that persons found not guilty by reason of insanity may not withdraw the defense in a habeas petition to pursue an alternative, although there have been exceptions in other rulings. In Colorado v. Connelly, 700 A.2d 694 (Conn. App. Ct. 1997), the petitioner who had originally been found not guilty by reason of insanity and committed for ten years to the jurisdiction of a Psychiatric Security Review Board, filed a pro se writ of habeas corpus and the court vacated his insanity acquittal. He was granted a new trial and found guilty of the original charges, receiving a prison sentence of 40 years.

In the landmark case of Frendak v. United States in 1979, the court ruled that the insanity defense cannot be imposed upon an unwilling defendant if an intelligent defendant voluntarily wishes to forgo the defense.

== Usage ==
According to an eight-state study, the insanity defense is used in less than 1% of all court cases, with 90% of individuals having been previously diagnosed with a mental health condition; when used, the defense has a 26% success rate.

A study of racial disparities in the rates of insanity defense found court-appointed mental health professionals are more likely to find that Black criminal defendants are to be determined not criminally responsible as compared to similarly situated white defendants. Another study found sentencing disparities by both race and sex connected to mental disorder diagnoses.

== Psychiatric treatment ==
Those found to have been not guilty by reason of mental disorder or insanity are generally then required to undergo psychiatric treatment in a mental institution, until the person is not a risk to public safety. Those who were found guilty but mentally ill undergo psychiatric treatment until no risk to public safety and then serve their remainder of sentence in prison.

In England and Wales, under the Criminal Procedure (Insanity and Unfitness to Plead) Act of 1991 (amended by the Domestic Violence, Crime and Victims Act, 2004 to remove the option of a guardianship order), the court can mandate a hospital order, a restriction order (where release from hospital requires the permission of the Home Secretary), a "supervision and treatment" order, or an absolute discharge. Unlike defendants who are found guilty of a crime, they are not institutionalized for a fixed period, but rather held in the institution until they are determined not to be a threat. Authorities making this decision tend to be cautious, and as a result, defendants can often be institutionalized for longer than they would have been incarcerated in prison.

== Worldwide ==
=== Australia ===
In Australia there are nine law units, each of which may have different rules governing mental impairment defenses.

==== South Australia ====
In South Australia, the Criminal Law Consolidation Act 1935 (SA) provides that:

269C—Mental competence A person is mentally incompetent to commit an offence if, at the time of the conduct alleged to give rise to the offence, the person is suffering from a mental impairment and, in consequence of the mental impairment—

- (a) does not know the nature and quality of the conduct; or
- (b) does not know that the conduct is wrong; or
- (c) is unable to control the conduct.

269H — Mental unfitness to stand trial

A person is mentally unfit to stand trial on a charge of an offence if the person's mental processes are so disordered or impaired that the person is—

- (a) unable to understand, or to respond rationally to, the charge or the allegations on which the charge is based; or
- (b) unable to exercise (or to give rational instructions about the exercise of) procedural rights (such as, for example, the right to challenge jurors); or (c) unable to understand the nature of the proceedings, or to follow the evidence or the course of the proceedings.

==== Victoria ====
In Victoria the current defence of mental impairment was introduced in the Crimes (Mental Impairment and Unfitness to be Tried) Act 1997 which replaced the common law defence of insanity and indefinite detention at the governor's pleasure with the following:

- the accused was suffering from a mental impairment; and
- the mental impairment affected the accused so they either did not understand the nature and quality of the conduct, or did not know that it was wrong.

These requirements are almost identical to the M'Naghten Rules, substituting "mental impairment" for "disease of the mind".

==== New South Wales ====
In New South Wales, the defence has been renamed the 'Defence of Mental Illness' in Part 4 of the Mental Health (Forensic Provisions) Act 1990. However, definitions of the defence are derived from M'Naghten's case and have not been codified. Whether a particular condition amounts to a disease of the mind is not a medical but a legal question to be decided in accordance with the ordinary rules of interpretation. This defence is an exception to the Woolmington v DPP (1935) 'golden thread', as the party raising the issue of the defence of mental illness bears the burden of proving this defence on the balance of probabilities. Generally, the defence will raise the issue of insanity. However, the prosecution can raise it in exceptional circumstances: R v Ayoub (1984).

Australian cases have further qualified and explained the M'Naghten Rules. The NSW Supreme Court has held there are two limbs to the M'Naghten Rules, that the accused did not know what he was doing, or that the accused did not appreciate that what he was doing was morally wrong, in both cases the accused must be operating under a "defect of reason, from a disease of the mind". The High Court in R v Porter stated that the condition of the accused's mind is relevant only at the time of the actus reus. In Woodbridge v The Queen the court stated that a symptom indicating a disease of the mind must be prone to recur and be the result of an underlying pathological infirmity. A 'defect of reason' is the inability to think rationally and pertains to incapacity to reason, rather than having unsound ideas or difficulty with such a task. Examples of disease of the mind include arteriosclerosis (considered so because the hardening of the arteries affects the mind).

=== Canada ===
==== Criminal Code provisions ====
The defence of mental disorder is codified in section 16 of the Criminal Code which states, in part:

16. (1) No person is criminally responsible for an act committed or an omission made while suffering from a mental disorder that rendered the person incapable of appreciating the nature and quality of the act or omission or of knowing that it was wrong.

To establish a claim of mental disorder the party raising the issue must show on a balance of probabilities first that the person who committed the act was suffering from a "disease of the mind", and second, that at the time of the offence they were either 1) unable to appreciate the "nature and quality" of the act, or 2) did not know it was "wrong".

The meaning of the word "wrong" was determined in the Supreme Court case of R. v. Chaulk [1990] 3 S.C.R. which held that "wrong" was NOT restricted to "legally wrong" but to "morally wrong" as well.

==== Post-verdict conditions ====
The current legislative scheme was created by the Parliament of Canada after the previous scheme was found unconstitutional in 1991 by the Supreme Court of Canada in R. v. Swain. The new provisions also replaced the old insanity defense with the current mental disorder defence.

Once a person is found not criminally responsible ("NCR"), they will have a hearing by a Review Board within 45 days (90 days if the court extends the delay). A Review Board is established under Part XX.1 of the Criminal Code and is composed of at least three members, a person who is a judge or eligible to be a judge, a psychiatrist and another expert in a relevant field, such as social work, criminology or psychology. Parties at a Review Board hearing are usually the accused, the Crown and the hospital responsible for the supervision or assessment of the accused. A Review Board is responsible for both accused persons found NCR or accused persons found unfit to stand trial on account of mental disorder. A Review Board dealing with an NCR offender must consider two questions: whether the accused is a "significant threat to the safety of the public" and, if so, what the "least onerous and least restrictive" restrictions on the liberty of the accused should be in order to mitigate such a threat. Proceedings before a Review Board are inquisitorial rather than adversarial. Often the Review Board will be active in conducting an inquiry. Where the Review Board is unable to conclude that the accused is a significant threat to the safety of the public, the review board must grant the accused an absolute discharge, an order essentially terminating the jurisdiction of the criminal law over the accused. Otherwise, the Review Board must order that the accused be either discharged subject to conditions or detained in a hospital, both subject to conditions. The conditions imposed must be the least onerous and least restrictive necessary to mitigate any danger the accused may pose to others.

Since the Review Board is empowered under criminal law powers under s. 91(27) of the Constitution Act, 1867 the sole justification for its jurisdiction is public safety. Therefore, the nature of the inquiry is the danger the accused may pose to public safety rather than whether the accused is "cured". For instance, many "sick" accused persons are discharged absolutely on the basis that they are not a danger to the public while many "sane" accused are detained on the basis that they are dangerous. Moreover, the notion of "significant threat to the safety of the public" is a "criminal threat". This means that the Review Board must find that the threat posed by the accused is of a criminal nature.

While proceedings before a Review Board are less formal than in court, there are many procedural safeguards available to the accused given the potential indefinite nature of Part XX.1. Any party may appeal against the decision of a Review Board.

In 1992 when the new mental disorder provisions were enacted, Parliament included "capping" provisions which were to be enacted at a later date. These capping provisions limited the jurisdiction of a Review Board over an accused based on the maximum potential sentence had the accused been convicted (e.g. there would be a cap of 5 years if the maximum penalty for the index offence is 5 years). However, these provisions were never proclaimed into force and were subsequently repealed.

A Review Board must hold a hearing every 12 months (unless extended to 24 months) until the accused is discharged absolutely.

==== Accused unfit to stand trial ====
The issue of mental disorder may also come into play before a trial even begins if the accused's mental state prevents the accused from being able to appreciate the nature of a trial and to conduct a defence.

An accused who is found to be unfit to stand trial is subject to the jurisdiction a Review Board. While the considerations are essentially the same, there are a few provisions which apply only to unfit accused. A Review Board must determine whether the accused is fit to stand trial. Regardless of the determination, the Review Board must then determine what conditions should be imposed on the accused, considering both the protection of the public and the maintenance of the fitness of the accused (or conditions which would render the accused fit). Previously an absolute discharge was unavailable to an unfit accused. However, in R. v. Demers, the Supreme Court of Canada struck down the provision restricting the availability of an absolute discharge to an accused person who is deemed both "permanently unfit" and not a significant threat to the safety of the public. Presently a Review Board may recommend a judicial stay of proceedings in the event that it finds the accused both "permanently unfit" and non-dangerous. The decision is left to the court having jurisdiction over the accused.

An additional requirement for an unfit accused is the holding of a "prima facie case" hearing every two years. The Crown must demonstrate to the court having jurisdiction over the accused that it still has sufficient evidence to try the accused. If the Crown fails to meet this burden then the accused is discharged and proceedings are terminated. The nature of the hearing is virtually identical to that of a preliminary hearing.

=== Denmark ===
In Denmark a psychotic person who commits a criminal defense is declared guilty but is sentenced to mandatory treatment instead of prison. Section 16 of the penal code states that "Persons, who, at the time of the act, were irresponsible owing to mental illness or similar conditions or to a pronounced mental deficiency, are not punishable". This means that in Denmark, 'insanity' is a legal term rather than a medical term and that the court retains the authority to decide whether an accused person is irresponsible.

=== Finland ===
In Finland, punishments can only be administered if the accused is compos mentis, of sound mind, but not if the accused is incapable of responsibility (syyntakeeton). Thus, an insane defendant may be found guilty based on the facts just like a sane defendant, but insanity will preclude punishment. The definition of insanity is similar to the M'Naughten criterion: "the accused is insane, if during the act, due to a mental illness, profound mental retardation or a severe disruption of mental health or consciousness, he cannot understand the actual nature of his act or its illegality, or that his ability to control his behavior is critically weakened". Any self-induced temporary mental disturbance, such as intoxication with alcohol or another psychoactive substance, cannot constitute insanity in this sense unless there are weighty reasons to consider it so.

If an accused is suspected to be insane, the court must consult the National Institute for Health and Welfare (THL), which is obliged to place the accused in involuntary commitment if they are found insane. The offender receives no judicial punishment; they become a patient under the jurisdiction of THL, and must be released immediately once the conditions of involuntary commitment are no longer fulfilled. Diminished responsibility is also available, resulting in lighter sentences.

=== Germany ===
According to section 20 of the German federal criminal code, those who commit an illegal act because a mental disorder makes them unable to see the wrong of the act or to act on this insight is considered not guilty. Section 63 stipulates that if the offender is deemed at risk of committing further offences that will harm others or cause grave economic damage, and if they therefore pose a continuing threat to public safety, they shall be committed to a psychiatric hospital in lieu of a custodial or suspended prison sentence.

=== Japan ===
If the ability to recognize the right or wrong of action or the ability to act accordingly is lost due to a mental disorder, then the defendant cannot be pursued under Japanese criminal law so if this is recognized during a trial then an innocent judgment will be given. This is, however, rare, happening in only around 1 in 500,000 cases.

=== Netherlands ===
Section 39 of the Dutch criminal code stipulates: "Not culpable is he who performs an act that he cannot be imputed with due to the deficient development or pathological disorder of his mental faculties". Critical are the definitions of "deficient development" and/or "pathological [mental] disorder". These are to be verified by somatomedical and/or psychiatric specialists. An inculpability defense needs to conform to the following criteria:

1. The defendant suffered from deficient development or pathological disorder of his mental faculties at the time at which the crime took place;
2. There is a probable causal relationship between deficient development or pathological (mental) disorder and the crime [i.e. not every disorder or developmental deficit excuses every crime]; and
3. Based on the criteria above, there is a reasonable assumption the deficient development or pathological disorder of his mental faculties excuses culpability of the crime.

If the inculpability defense succeeds, the defendant cannot be ordered to incarceration proper. If the defendant is deemed to be criminally insane (i.e. deemed to pose a risk to himself or others), the court instead may order involuntary admission to a mental institution for further evaluation and/or treatment. The court can opt for a definite period of time (when complete or at least sufficient recovery of mental faculties on a relatively short time scale is probable) or an indefinite period of time (when the defendant's ailment is deemed to be difficult or impossible to treat, or can be supposed to be refractory to treatment).

If the inculpability defense succeeds only partly ([i.e. if the crime cannot be completely excused because of a minor degree of deficient development or pathological (mental) disorder), there may still be a legal basis for a diminished culpability of the defendant; in such case, a diminished prison sentence should be ordered. This can also be combined with the aforementioned involuntary admission to a mental institution, although in these cases the two 'sentences' often run/are served in parallel.

=== Norway ===
In Norway, psychotic perpetrators are declared guilty but not punished and, instead of prison, they are sentenced to mandatory treatment. Section 44 of the penal code states specifically that "a person who at the time of the crime was insane or unconscious is not punished".

=== Poland ===
Insanity is determined through a judicial decision issued on the basis of expert opinions of psychiatrists and psychologists.

=== Russia ===
A forensic psychiatric examination is used to establish insanity. The result of the forensic examination is then subjected to a legal assessment, taking into account other circumstances of the case, from which a conclusion is drawn about the defendant's sanity or insanity. The Criminal Code of Russia establishes that a person who during the commission of an illegal act was in a state of insanity, that is, could not be aware of the actual nature and social danger of their actions or was unable to control them due to a chronic mental disorder, a temporary mental disorder, or dementia is not subject to criminal liability.

=== Sweden ===
In Sweden, psychotic perpetrators are seen as accountable, but the sanction is, if they are psychotic at the time of the trial, forensic mental care.

=== United Kingdom ===
==== England and Wales ====
Although use of the insanity defense is rare, since the Criminal Procedure (Insanity and Unfitness to Plead) Act 1991, insanity pleas have steadily increased in England and Wales.

==== Scotland ====
The Scottish Law Commission, in its Discussion Paper No 122 on Insanity and Diminished Responsibility (2003) confirms that the law has not substantially changed from the position stated in Hume's Commentaries in 1797:

We may next attend to the case of those unfortunate persons, who have plead the miserable defense of idiocy or insanity. Which condition, if it is not an assumed or imperfect, but a genuine and thorough insanity, and is proved by the testimony of intelligent witnesses, makes the act like that of an infant, and equally bestows the privilege of an entire exemption from any manner of pain; Cum alterum innocentia concilii tuetur, alterum fati infelicitas excusat. I say, where the insanity is absolute, and is duly proved: For if reason and humanity enforce the plea in these circumstances, it is no less necessary to observe a caution and reserve in applying the law, as shall hinder it from being understood, that there is any privilege in a case of mere weakness of intellect, or a strange and moody humor, or a crazy and capricious or irritable temper. In none of these situations does or can the law excuse the offender. Because such constitutions are not exclusive of a competent understanding of the true state of the circumstances in which the deed is done, nor of the subsistence of some steady and evil passion, grounded in those circumstances, and directed to a certain object. To serve the purpose of a defense in law, the disorder must therefore amount to an absolute alienation of reason, ut continua mentis alienatione, omni intellectu careat – such a disease as deprives the patient of the knowledge of the true aspect and position of things about them – hinders them from distinguishing friend from foe – and gives them up to the impulse of their own distempered fancy.

The phrase "absolute alienation of reason" is still regarded as at the core of the defense in the modern law (see HM Advocate v Kidd (1960) JC 61 and Brennan v HM Advocate (1977)

=== United States ===
In the United States, variances in the insanity defense between states, and in the federal court system, are attributable to differences with respect to three key issues:

1. Availability: whether the jurisdiction allows a defendant to raise the insanity defense,
2. Definition: when the defense is available, what facts will support a finding of insanity, and
3. Burden of proof: whether the defendant has the duty of proving insanity or the prosecutor has the duty of disproving insanity, and by what standard of proof.

In Foucha v. Louisiana (1992) the Supreme Court of the United States ruled that a person could not be held "indefinitely" for psychiatric treatment following a finding of not guilty by reason of insanity.

==== Availability ====
In the United States, a criminal defendant may plead insanity in federal court, and in the state courts of every state except for Idaho, Kansas, Montana, and Utah. However, defendants in states that disallow the insanity defense may still be able to demonstrate that a defendant was not capable of forming intent to commit a crime as a result of mental illness.

In Kahler v. Kansas (2020), the U.S. Supreme Court held, in a 6–3 ruling, that a state does not violate the Due Process Clause by abolishing an insanity defense based on a defendant's incapacity to distinguish right from wrong. The Court emphasized that state governments have broad discretion to choose laws defining "the precise relationship between criminal culpability and mental illness".

==== Definition ====
Each state and the federal court system currently uses one of the following "tests" to define insanity for purposes of the insanity defense. Over its decades of use the definition of insanity has been modified by statute, with changes to the availability of the insanity defense, what constitutes legal insanity, whether the prosecutor or defendant has the burden of proof, the standard of proof required at trial, trial procedures, and to commitment and release procedures for defendants who have been acquitted based on a finding of insanity.

==== M'Naghten test ====
The M'Naghten rules state, among other things, that a person may be "insane" if "...at the time of the committing of the act, the party accused was laboring under such a defect of reason, arising from a disease of the mind, as not to know the nature and quality of the act he was doing, or, if he did know it, that he did not know what he was doing was wrong." The guidelines were settled in the British courts in the case of Daniel M'Naghten in 1843. M'Naghten was a Scottish woodcutter who killed the secretary to the prime minister, Edward Drummond, in a botched attempt to assassinate the prime minister himself. M'Naghten apparently believed that the prime minister was the architect of the myriad of personal and financial misfortunes that had befallen him. During his trial, nine witnesses testified to the fact that he was insane, and the jury acquitted him, finding him "not guilty by reason of insanity".

The House of Lords asked the judges of the common law courts to answer five questions on insanity as a criminal defence, and the formulation that emerged from their review—that a defendant should not be held responsible for their actions only if, as a result of their mental disease or defect, they (i) did not know that their act would be wrong; or (ii) did not understand the nature and quality of their actions—became the basis of the law governing legal responsibility in cases of insanity in England and Wales. Under the rules, loss of control because of mental illness was no defense.

The M'Naghten rule was embraced with almost no modification by American courts and legislatures for more than 100 years, until the mid-20th century. It was first used as a defense in the United States in the case of People v. Freeman in 1847, where an Afro-Native man from Auburn, New York was tried for a quadruple murder. William H. Seward represented William Freeman and argued that Freeman was mentally insane after being committed to the Auburn State Prison for a crime Freeman insisted he did not commit. This was a novel defense at the time, and produced much controversy in the town of Auburn, New York, and throughout the United States at large.

==== Durham/New Hampshire test ====
The strict M'Naghten standard for the insanity defense was widely used until the 1950s and the case of Durham v. United States case. In the Durham case, the court ruled that a defendant is entitled to acquittal if the crime was the product of their mental illness (i.e., crime would not have been committed but for the disease). The Durham rule, also called the Product Test, is broader than either the M'Naghten test or the irresistible impulse test. The test has more lenient guidelines for the insanity defense, but it addressed the issue of convicting mentally ill defendants, which was allowed under the M'Naghten Rule. However, the Durham standard drew much criticism because of its expansive definition of legal insanity. It was abandoned in the 1970s, after the case of United States v. Brawner (1972).

==== Model Penal Code test ====
The Model Penal Code, published by the American Law Institute, provides the ALI rule – a standard for legal insanity that serves as a compromise between the strict M'Naghten Rule, the lenient Durham ruling, and the irresistible impulse test. Under the MPC standard, which represents the modern trend, a defendant is not responsible for criminal conduct "if at the time of such conduct as a result of mental disease or defect he lacks substantial capacity either to appreciate the criminality of their conduct or to conform their conduct to the requirements of the law". The test thus takes into account both the cognitive and volitional capacity of insanity.

==== Federal courts ====
After the perpetrator of President Reagan's assassination attempt was found not guilty by reason of insanity, Congress passed the Insanity Defense Reform Act of 1984. Under this act, the burden of proof was shifted from the prosecution to the defense and the standard of evidence in federal trials was increased from a preponderance of evidence to clear and convincing evidence. The ALI test was discarded in favor of a new test that more closely resembled M'Naghten's. Under this new test only perpetrators suffering from severe mental illnesses at the time of the crime could successfully employ the insanity defense. The defendant's ability to control himself or herself was no longer a consideration.

The Act also curbed the scope of expert psychiatric testimony and adopted stricter procedures regarding the hospitalization and release of those found not guilty by reason of insanity.

Those acquitted of a federal offense by reason of insanity have not been able to challenge their psychiatric confinement through a writ of habeas corpus or other remedies. In Archuleta v. Hedrick, 365 F.3d 644 (8th Cir. 2004), the U.S. Court of Appeals for the Eighth Circuit the court ruled persons found not guilty by reason of insanity and later want to challenge their confinement may not attack their initial successful insanity defense:

The appellate court affirmed the lower court's judgment: "Having thus elected to make himself a member of that 'exceptional class' of persons who seek verdicts of not guilty by reason of insanity ... he cannot now be heard to complain of the statutory consequences of his election." The court held that no direct attack upon the final judgment of acquittal by reason of insanity was possible. It also held that the collateral attack that he was not informed that a possible alternative to his commitment was to ask for a new trial was not a meaningful alternative.

==== Guilty but mentally ill ====
As an alternative to the insanity defense, some jurisdictions permit a defendant to plead guilty but mentally ill. A defendant who is found guilty but mentally ill may be sentenced to mental health treatment, at the conclusion of which the defendant will serve the remainder of their sentence in the same manner as any other defendant.

==== Burden of proof ====
In a majority of states, the burden of proving insanity is placed on the defendant, who must prove insanity by a preponderance of the evidence.

In a minority of states, the burden is placed on the prosecution, who must prove sanity beyond reasonable doubt.

In federal court the burden is placed on the defendant, who must prove insanity by clear and convincing evidence. See 18 U.S.C.S. Sec. 17(b); see also A.R.S. Sec. 13-502(C).

==== Controversy ====
The insanity plea is used in the U.S. criminal justice system in less than 1% of all criminal cases. Little is known about the criminal justice system and the mentally ill:

[T]here is no definitive study regarding the percentage of people with mental illness who come into contact with police, appear as criminal defendants, are incarcerated, or are under community supervision. Furthermore, the scope of this issue varies across jurisdictions. Accordingly, advocates should rely as much as possible on statistics collected by local and state government agencies.

Some U.S. states have begun to ban the use of the insanity defense, and in 1994 the Supreme Court denied a petition of certiorari seeking review of a Montana Supreme Court case that upheld Montana's abolition of the defense. Idaho, Kansas, and Utah have also banned the defense. However, a mentally ill defendant/patient can be found unfit to stand trial in these states. In 2001, the Nevada Supreme Court found that their state's abolition of the defense was unconstitutional as a violation of Federal due process. In 2006, the Supreme Court decided Clark v. Arizona upholding Arizona's limitations on the insanity defense. In that same ruling, the Court noted "We have never held that the Constitution mandates an insanity defense, nor have we held that the Constitution does not so require." In 2020, the Supreme Court decided Kahler v. Kansas upholding Kansas' abolition of the insanity defense, stating that the Constitution does not require Kansas to adopt an insanity test that turns on a defendant's ability to recognize that their crime was morally wrong.

The insanity defense is also complicated because of the underlying differences in philosophy between psychiatrists/psychologists and legal professionals. In the United States, a psychiatrist, psychologist or other mental health professional is often consulted as an expert witness in insanity cases, but the ultimate legal judgment of the defendant's sanity is determined by a jury, not by a mental health professional. In other words, mental health professionals provide testimony and professional opinion but are not ultimately responsible for answering legal questions.

== See also ==
- Murder of Generro Sanchez
- Archuleta v. Hedrick
- By Reason of Insanity (TV series), a documentary about a hospital in Ohio housing the guilty-but-insane
- Diminished responsibility (or "Limited Sanity")
- Frendak v. United States
- Intoxication defence
- Mentally ill people in American prisons
- M'Naghten rules
- NCR: Not Criminally Responsible, a Canadian documentary film about the mental disorder defense
- Non compos mentis
- Nulla poena sine culpa
- People v. Drew
- Right to an effective remedy
- Sanity
- Settled insanity
- State v. Strasburg
- Twinkie defense
- United States federal laws governing offenders with mental diseases or defects
- Victims' rights
- Category:People acquitted by reason of insanity
