= Excuse =

Concept in criminal jurisprudence

In jurisprudence, an excuse is a defense to criminal charges that is distinct from an exculpation. Justification and excuse are different defenses in a criminal case (see Justification and excuse). Exculpation is a related concept which reduces or extinguishes a person's culpability, such as their liability to pay compensation to the victim of a tort in the civil law.

An excuse provides a mitigating factor for a group of persons sharing a common characteristic. Justification, as in justifiable homicide, vindicates or shows the justice. Thus, society approves of the purpose or motives underpinning some actions or the consequences flowing from them (see Robinson), and distinguishes those where the behavior cannot be approved but some excuse may be found in the characteristics of the defendant, e.g. that the accused was a serving police officer or suffering from a mental illness. Thus, a justification describes the quality of the act, whereas an excuse relates to the status or capacity (or lack of it) in the accused. These factors can affect the resulting judgment which may be an acquittal, or in the case of a conviction may mitigate sentencing. An excuse may also be something that a person or persons use to explain any criticism or comments based on the outcome of any specific event.

== Explanation ==
The executive and legislative branches of modern states enact policy into laws which are then administered through the judicial system. Judges also have a residual discretion to excuse individuals from liability if it represents a just result. When considering the consequences which are to be imposed on those involved in the activities forming the subject matter of the common law or legislation, governments and judges have a choice:

the criminal or civil defendant may be excused from liability as belonging to a class of person that ought to be excused, their behaviour may be considered justified, or an exculpation may be allowed on the merits of the particular case.

To be excused from liability means that although the defendant may have been a participant in the sequence of events leading to the prohibited outcome, no liability will attach to the particular defendant because they belong to a class of person exempted from liability. In some cases, this will be a policy of expediency. Hence, members of the armed forces, the police or other civil organizations may be granted a degree of immunity for causing prohibited outcomes while acting in the course of their official duties, e.g. for an assault or trespass to the person caused during a lawful arrest or for an ambulance driver exceeding the speed limit in an emergency. Others are excused by virtue of their status and capacity. Others may escape liability because the quality of their actions satisfied a general public good. For example, the willingness to defend oneself and others, or property from injury may benefit society at large. Albeit that the actions of a vigilante fall outside the formal controls that would seek to ensure reasonable use of force in state-appointed police officers, such people may accidentally find themselves interrupting the commission of a crime and their actions in defence of their own or another's interests is justified out of expediency as opposed to having to wait until a police officer arrives before help can be rendered. Whilst the jurisprudential importance of the distinction between justification and excuse defenses is clear, legally they have the same effect, acquittal, and there is an ongoing debate about whether the distinction makes any practical difference.

An exculpation is a defense in which a defendant argues that despite the fact they committed and are guilty of the crime, tort, or other wrong and have a liability to compensate the victim, they should be exculpated because of special circumstances that operated in favor of the defendant at the time they broke the law.

=== Defenses ===
Defense of infancy
This is an aspect of the public policy of parens patriae. In the criminal law, each state will consider the nature of its own society and the available evidence of the age at which antisocial behavior begins to manifest itself. Some societies will have qualities of indulgence toward the young and inexperienced and will not wish them to be exposed to the criminal law system before all other avenues of response have been exhausted. Hence, some states have a policy of doli incapax and exclude liability for all acts and omissions that would otherwise have been criminal up to a specified age. Thereafter, there may be a rebuttable presumption against the use of criminal sanctions except in more serious cases. Other states leave discretion to prosecutors to argue or the judges to rule on whether the child understood that what was being done was wrong.
The status of minor may also excuse liability in the civil law for contract, tort and other legal situations during which liabilities would otherwise attach to the infant. Where there is only minimal understanding, transactions entered into will be void, i.e. the infant is excused. When understanding grows in line with age, the law switches from excuse to exculpation, and transactions may be voidable, i.e. the courts will judge, whether in the particular circumstances, it would be right to favor the interests of the child or the interests of the other party or parties involved in the transaction. Hence, it would not be appropriate to allow a child knowingly to deceive innocent retailers or service providers into supplying value, and then allow him or her to avoid liability to pay a reasonable sum of money for those goods or services. This is a balancing of political and commercial interests.
Insanity defense, mental disorder defences and the M'Naghten Rules
If individuals are a danger to society and/or to themselves but not responsible through a lack of understanding, there is no point in punishment (whether in the criminal or non-criminal sense). Punishment is only justified morally if the person understands that what was done was wrong and accepts the judgment of society as part of the process of expiation and rehabilitation. Hence, as with parens patriae, the state accepts the person as being in need of care, and offers or requires medical treatment instead of subjecting such people to the stress of having to undergo a trial as to liability.
Settled insanity
A permanent or "settled" condition caused by long-term substance abuse and differs from the temporary state of intoxication. In some United States jurisdictions "settled insanity" can be used as a basis for an insanity defense, even though voluntary intoxication can not, if the "settled insanity" negates one of the required elements of the crime such as mens rea.
Automatism
This criminal defense straddles the divide between excuse and exculpation. It works by showing that the defendant's mind was not in control of the body's movements at the relevant time and that this loss of control was not foreseeable. For example, a diabetic suffering a hypoglycaemic attack will not be liable for any loss or damage caused. To that extent, it borrows from the policy excuse favoring those who are suffering from a mental illness, but allows the full trial as to liability to proceed. For a detailed comparative law discussion, see automatism (case law).
Self-defense
In general, some reasonable action taken in protection of self. An act taken in self-defense often is not a crime at all; no punishment will be imposed. To qualify, any defensive force must be proportionate to the threat. Use of a firearm in response to a non-lethal threat is a typical example of disproportionate force; however, such decisions are dependent on the situation and the applicable law, and thus the example situation can in some circumstances be defensible, generally because of a codified presumption intended to prevent the unjust negation of this defense by the trier of fact.

=== Exculpations ===
Duress in criminal law and in contract law
In this situation, the defendant has actually done everything to break the law and intended to do it to avoid some threatened or actual harm. Thus, some degree of liability already attaches to the defendant for what was done. In law, the usual rule is that the defendant's motive for breaking the law is irrelevant although, in the criminal law, this may reduce the sentence. The basis of the defense argues that the threats made by the other person make the defendant's entire behavior involuntary and therefore the liability should be reduced or removed. The extent to which this defense should be allowed, if at all, is a simple matter of public policy. A state may say that no threat should force a person deliberately to break the law, particularly if this breach will cause loss or damage to a third person. Alternatively, a state may take the view that even though people may have ordinary levels of courage, they may nevertheless be coerced into agreeing to break the law and this human weakness should have some recognition in the law. For example, suppose that a group of terrorists kidnap A's family and instruct A to carry a large bomb into a crowded area as the price for the release of their family. If A carries out these instructions, making no effort to contact the police or to warn those in the danger area, the issue of liability for death and injury resulting depends on the state's values. This is a legal as well as a political decision. In the civil law, duress is similarly only an exculpation, rendering contracts and other transactions voidable, and offering only minor mitigation in the calculation of the amount of any damages payable.
Mistake of fact and mistake of law in criminal law and in mistake in contract law
The general policy usually allocated in cases of mistakes is ignorantia juris non excusat, i.e. the state cannot allow ignorance of the law to be a defense. This would unduly encourage the lazy and the deceitful to trade on their ignorance (real or otherwise). Thus, usually only mistakes relating to the factual basis of what is being attempted can form this defense and, in the majority of situations, it will only offer limited benefit to a defendant of ordinary capacity since the state owes no general duty to save citizens from the effects of their own ignorance or stupidity. Nevertheless, there may be limited circumstances in which people may honestly believe things that either prevent them from forming the requisite mens rea or from reaching an ad idem agreement.
Provocation
This is an example of a purely mitigatory defense in that, in the few situations when it is allowed to operate, it only reduces the level of criminal liability. In most legal systems, it cannot extinguish liability. It is a natural part of human nature that people get angry when they are provoked. But the state has a positive interest in maintaining good order and therefore, no matter what is done or said, people are not supposed to react violently or to cause loss or damage. Even though certain forms of physical contact or particular words might cause even reasonable people to become seriously annoyed, the state cannot sanction or justify retaliation. Thus, in most aspects of the law, any loss of control is taken to be an aggravating factor that, in the criminal law or the law of intentional torts, might well lead to an increase in sentencing, or the award of punitive or exemplary damages.
