= ALI rule =

Guideline governing legal pleas of insanity

The ALI rule, or American Law Institute Model Penal Code rule, is a recommended rule for instructing juries how to find a defendant in a criminal trial is not guilty by reason of insanity. It broadened the M'Naghten rule of whether a defendant was so mentally ill that he is unable to "know" the nature and quality of his criminal act, or know its wrongfulness, to a question of whether he had "substantial capacity to appreciate the criminality of [his] conduct". It also added a volitional component as to whether defendant was lacking in "substantial capacity to conform his conduct to the law".

It arose from the case of United States v. Brawner., in which the court first adopted the American Law Institute's Model Penal Code rule, thereby moving away from the Durham rule.

The ALI rule is:

"(1) A person is not responsible for criminal conduct if at the time of such conduct as a result of mental disease or defect he lacks substantial capacity either to appreciate the criminality of his conduct or to conform his conduct to the requirements of the law.
"(2) As used in this Article, the terms "mental disease or defect" do not include an abnormality manifested only by repeated criminal or otherwise antisocial conduct [Section 4.01]."

== See also ==
- M'Naghten rules
- Durham rule
