= Justification (jurisprudence) =

Idea in law

Justification is a defense in a criminal case, by which a defendant who committed the acts asserts that because what they did meets certain legal standards, they are not criminally culpable for the acts which would otherwise be criminal. Justification and excuse are related but different defenses (see Justification and excuse).

Justification is an exception to the prohibition of committing certain offenses. Justification can be a defense in a prosecution for a criminal offense. When an act is justified, a person is not criminally liable even though their act would otherwise constitute an offense. For example, to intentionally commit a homicide would be considered murder. However, it is not considered a crime if committed in self-defense. In addition to self-defense, the other justification defenses are defense of others, defense of property, and necessity.

A justification is not the same as an excuse. In contrast, an excuse is a defense that recognizes a crime was committed, but that for the defendant, although committing a socially undesirable crime, conviction and punishment would be morally inappropriate because of an extenuating personal inadequacy, such as mental defect, lack of mental capacity, sufficient age, intense fear of death, lacking the ability to control their own conduct, etc.
