= Planned unit development =

American urban planning process

In the United States, a planned unit development (PUD) is a type of flexible zoning device that redefines the land uses allowed on a site, and also the resulting unitary site plan. PUDs group together both varied and compatible land uses—such as housing, recreation, commercial centers, and industrial parks—within one contained development or subdivision. They facilitate development flexibility and the combination of mixed-use development with environmental preservation and sustainability, including open space. Developed areas vary in size and by zoned uses, including industrial, commercial, and residential. The first use of a PUD is believed to have been in 1949. Comparable zoning devices include floating zones, overlay zones, special district zoning, performance-based codes, and transferable development rights.

== History ==
The conceptual origins of PUDs date back to the 1926 enactment of the Model Planning Enabling Act of 1925 by the Committee on the Regional Plan of New York, which allowed for the decisions of planning boards and commissions to precede decisions required by local zoning regulations. Specifically, Section 12 of the Model Planning Enabling Act authorized planning boards and commissions to reasonably modify or change development plans and limited average population density and total land area covered by buildings. Similarly, Sections 14 and 15 of the Standard City Planning Enabling Act of 1928 allowed planning commissions to authorize PUDs, upon an agreement between the government and developers on the PUD's design principles and its impact to both the surrounding community and economy.

The physical origins of PUDs are rooted in the increased suburbanization of the mid-twentieth century, during which the oldest forms of PUDs in America appeared shortly after World War II in the Levittown and Park Forest developments. Increased implementation of PUDs arose in response to both the lack of aesthetic variation among suburban homes and the increasing need for higher suburban density to accommodate rising population sizes. PUDs resolved the problems of large-scale, suburban development in multiple, separate land uses were efficiently combined, preserving valuable open space and suburban aesthetics within specific site parameters limitations. The first zoning evidence of PUD was in Prince George's County, Maryland in 1949, in which the developmental unit consisted of multiple land uses, in contrast to the county's previous commitment to single-use zoning (known in the United States as "Euclidean zoning").

The usage of PUDs in new American communities has been, in part, the result of some international influence; British towns, like Reston, England, in the 1950s attempted to increase their economic base through the integration of industrial elements into the area. Though American new communities had to attract industry post-development of residential sectors, American new communities had similar economic needs to these British towns and, consequently, used PUDS to increase the percent of allowed industrial acreage relative to residential and nonresidential acreage.

== Current definitions ==
PUD is a means of land regulation that promotes large scale, site-specific, mixed-use land development. PUDs are a very flexible form of zoning, as compared to single-use zoning, in that they promote innovative and creative design and can encourage environmental conservation as well as affordable housing, clustering, and increased density. Where appropriate, this type of development promotes:

- Upfront completion of project plans before development begins
- A mixture of both land uses—such as those of commercial and industrial natures—and dwelling types that is more innovative than standard zoning ordinances
- The clustering of residential land uses provides public and common open space.
- Environmentally friendly preservation of sensitive lands, such as hills or wetlands, that would otherwise have been developed
- Reduction of greenhouse gas emissions if PUD prioritizes walkability alongside mixed uses
- Reduction of development and administrative costs, particularly infrastructure costs like those of streets, driveways, and water and sewer lines
- Increased administrative discretion to a local professional planning staff while setting aside present land use regulations and rigid plat approval processes
- The enhancement of the bargaining process between the developer and government municipalities
- Increased population densities and reduced street widths
- Increase in available community amenities—like bike trails and recreation centers—and natural open spaces

Frequently, PUDs take on a variety of forms ranging from small clusters of houses combined with open spaces to new and developing towns with thousands of residents and various land uses.

== Mixtures of land uses ==
PUDs are in direct contradiction to the single-use or "Euclidean" zoning that has dominated in the United States since the Village of Euclid v. Ambler Realty Co. decision. Within PUDs, zoning becomes much more integrated with multiple land uses and districts being placed on adjacent land parcels. The enactment of the Standard Zoning Enabling Act (SZEA) reinforced that density is considered a regulatory priority, further supporting the development of PUDs through the integration of varying lot sizes, varied building uses, and the mixture of different types of housing.

PUDs combine residential and non-residential uses—like offices, commercial stores, and other services—and attracts a diversified community. Notably, sidewalks and streets of PUDs tend to be more active and safer, both at day and night, and experiences reduced congestion during peak times. Detailed plans and review processes are required to approve development of PUDs, due to the nature of mixing residential and non-residential uses into land areas previously only allowed for single-use; approving a PUD essentially requires a legal rezoning, in which variances and conditional use permits must be cleared by a planning board or commission with regard to the municipality's comprehensive plan.

=== Maintenance of common areas ===
PUD provisions include consideration of the ability of the owners, or related stakeholders, to ensure the maintenance of common, public areas; such provisions include related costs, income level and interests of stakeholders, and the nature of both the common area and surrounding developments. Throughout the development process, which is already scheduled and preapproved as part of the PUD application process, maintenance of common areas can be sustained through calculated servicing of inroads. Post-development, governing documents of homeowners associations within PUDs often delegate most of the maintenance responsibilities to the owners, assuming the least amount of responsibility possible.

== Design principles ==
=== Minimum parcel size ===
The minimum parcel size requirement can be measured in either dwelling units or acres and can vary depending on both the type and location of a development. Given that minimum parcel sizes are a factor rarely necessary for project approval, maximum density requirements are more often used instead, focusing on either a maximum number of units per acre or a minimum lot acre per each dwelling unit.

=== Uses permitted ===
Uses permitted is determined by allotting certain percentages of land use to residential, commercial, and industrial uses. Oftentimes, the amount allotted is dependent on the percentage of residential uses relative to non-residential uses within a defined area.

=== Density ===
Given that PUDs focus on integrating mixed uses into a specified area, density is calculated based on the Federal Housing Act's Land Use Intensity (LUI) rating, which encompasses floor area, open space, livability, and recreational spaces within a single, numerical rating.

=== Houses and placement of houses ===
Houses in PUDS often include access to a large, shared open space surrounding the house, as well as a smaller, private yard. Clustered residential homes and buildings also provides homeowners with lower prices, in the form of lower infrastructural costs from shorter streets and by offering a mix of single-family, two-family, multiple-family housing. PUDs can be considered a legal alternative to large lot, single-family zoning for how the land area can increase residential housing available while maintaining a small impact on local property taxes. Homes can be placed next to commercial and office land uses, while ensuring the preservation of other areas. Homes, however, often visually feature garages instead of front porches, as they are placed in the periphery, relative to small strip malls created through other PUD initiatives.

=== Size considerations ===
Smaller-sized PUDs, generally less than 250 acres, can promote the mixed-use of the development, but, because they are too small to influence nearby development, can contribute to sprawl in nearby peripheral and rural areas. In smaller PUDs, offering shopping facilities for only the residents may not be sustainable or viable for the development. Mid-sized PUDs, generally greater than 250 acres but less than 1000 acres, can maintain a balance between developmental influence to nearby areas, while still maintaining adequate cash flow requirements. Moderately-sized PUDs also contribute to the development of commercial highways and residential areas, which can increase the ability of smaller-areas of land being more efficiently developed or used. Larger-sized PUDs, generally greater than 1000 acres, can control sprawl-related issues, yet may also strain the management capacity of local developers.

=== Usable, public open space ===
There are multiple provisions PUDs must include in regard to available open spaces, which include, upon conditional approval, those concerning quantity, location, and maintenance of public areas. Approval for such provisions can be satisfied by one of the following: satisfying a minimum acreage requirement relative to a specific number of dwelling units or a direct percentage of gross acreage; approval from a planning board on the proposed location of the public, open space; or cosigned maintenance agreements between residents —regardless of whether it be by a municipality or an organized residential community, like a homeowner' association or a community trust. The requirement of these aforementioned revisions is to ensure that open, public land, facilities, amenities, and necessities are well-kept for ease of public use and accessibility.

=== Streets ===
Street patterns can be used to change the neighborhood character of a residential community, particularly by allowing developers to flexibly arrange buildings without having to adhere to non-PUD zoning regulations. Wide, curvilinear, and cul-de-sac street patterns are examples. The usage of these street, round street patterns allow developers to cluster buildings and maximize available open space. Existing street and block patterns, historic preservation, and reservation of ground-floor streetfronts for non-residential, commercial uses are also considered when a community approves a PUD.

=== Combining design features ===
The flexibility to include multiple amenities—like utilities, recreational facilities, schools, and parks—within a development unit can increase the mixed-use capability of a given piece of land. PUD project plans that integrate non-residential uses with residential uses, such as single-family houses and apartments, facilitate planning to maximize safe and convenient navigation between the various buildings, spaces, and streets of the development by both pedestrians and vehicles. Ownership of and responsibility for such PUDs may be either public or private.
