= Contract zoning =

Contract zoning in the United States, also referred to as "zoning by contract", "rezoning by contract", or "rezoning subject to conditions" is a form of land use regulation in which a local zoning authority accommodates a private interest by rezoning a district or a parcel of land within that district to a zoning classification with fewer restrictions based on an agreement that the property owner abide by certain conditions or limitations imposed by the zoning authority for that parcel.

Contract zoning is a contentious practice in that, by definition, it involves public servants or officials, namely an Urban planner, working outside of a locality’s general plan. Opponents of contract zoning are wary of the practice insofar as it might lead to “arbitrariness and random decision making” in land use planning and thus the overall design of a locality. Proponents of the practice argue that it is a useful tool for achieving dynamic development, especially in growing urban areas where there is an increasing emphasis on mixed-use and higher density development.

== Legality of the practice ==
There is no explicit federal law banning or allowing contract zoning. Instead, the legality of the practice has largely been regulated on a case by case basis at the state court level. In the past, many of the decisions in these state court hearings have deemed the practice to be illegal based on interpretations that it was “illegal bargaining away”, “inconsistent with uniformity requirements”, or that it had a potential to lead to corruption. In recent decisions, however, state courts have tended be more accepting of contract zoning as long as the rezoning to accommodate the private interest does not impede the municipality’s ability to use police power.

=== Example court decisions ===
An example of an early, often cited decision regarding contract zoning is Church vs. Town of Islip (New York 1960) in which the court found the practice to be illegal, stating:

"Zoning of properties by a municipality, being legislative in character, cannot be bargained or sold. The rezoning of a parcel of property by a municipality based in any way upon an offer or agreement by an owner of property is inconsistent with, and disruptive of, a comprehensive zoning plan."

An example of a more recent ruling concerning contract zoning is Chrismon v. Guilford County (North Carolina 1988) in which the state supreme court made a distinction between illegal contract zoning, defined as follows:

“Illegal contract zoning properly connotes a transaction wherein both the landowner who is seeking a certain zoning action and the zoning authority itself undertake reciprocal obligations in the context of a bilateral contract. . . .”

And legal conditional zoning as follows:

“The practice of conditional use zoning …is one of several vehicles by which greater zoning flexibility can be and has been acquired by zoning authorities. Conditional use zoning anticipates that when the rezoning of certain property within the general zoning framework described above would constitute an unacceptably drastic change, such a rezoning could still be accomplished through the addition of certain conditions or use limitations. Specifically, conditional use zoning occurs when a governmental body, without committing its own authority, secures a given property owner's agreement to limit the use of his property to a particular use or to subject his tract to certain restrictions as a precondition to any rezoning. ..”

The key distinction between illegal contract zoning and permissible conditional zoning is transparency of the public process and the extent to which the legislative body agrees to written specifics in the zoning ordinance. The degree to which the conditions imposed on the agreement to re-zone are deemed to be in the public interest or to merely benefit the private land interest is also sometimes discussed. A Florida court said this: "A rule which would forbid owners from announcing concessions to the public interest in any proceeding before a zoning authority would not be in the best interest of the public." See also,

== See also ==
- Conditional rezoning
- Zoning
- Zoning in the United States (land use)
- Spot zoning
