= Special-use permit =

A special-use permit, sometimes known variously as a special permit, special exception use permit, conditional use permit, or some other similar name, is a type of review for certain uses sometimes included within a local government's land use regulations.

== Purpose ==
Land use is governed by a set of regulations generally known as ordinances or municipal codes, which are authorized by the state's zoning enabling law. Zoning ordinances typical list the types of districts and specify the uses permitted in each district. These are often known as permitted or by-right uses. Many ordinances also provided additional uses listed as special or conditional. To establish this type of use, a special-use permit (or conditional-use permit) must be obtained.

An example of a special-use permit may be found in a church applying for one to construct a church building in a residential neighborhood. Although the church building is not a residential building, the zoning law may allow for churches in the residential neighborhood if the local zoning authority may review the impact on the neighborhood. This process grants discretion to the local zoning authority to ensure that an acceptable land use does not disrupt the zoning scheme because of its particular location.

== US Zoning Model Act ==
The Standard State Zoning Enabling Act allows special-use permits based upon a finding of compatibility with surrounding areas and with developments already permitted under the general provisions of the ordinance.

== Abuse ==
If the local zoning authority grants a special-use permit that exceeds the discretion allowed to it, then an incidence of spot zoning may arise. Such discretion then may be attacked as ultra vires, and the special-use permit overturned as an unconstitutional violation of equal protection.

Special-use permit review is sometimes used when a property has been deemed a "nonconforming use", and a further change or expansion of the use is proposed. A permit for a nonconforming use will allow the owner of a previously-compliant property to continue the existing use or to expand. This often arises when a property has been rezoned or amortized. Amortization is unconstitutional in many states, and is a controversial tool according to many property rights advocacy groups.

An example of special-use-permit abuse may be found when a business or other organization is using U.S. Forest Service land for commercial use. Special-use permits may be revoked after the initial period if it is deemed to have not met the proposed public need. This then allows for another operator to apply for the special-use permit which will be evaluated on whether they are likely to succeed and meet the public need as well as follow all other criteria such as proper resource management and respectful public use. If deemed successful after the initial period the permit can be renewed for a longer period.

== Other uses ==
Special land-use permits are also issued by the U.S. Forest Service for the operation of ski areas and other recreational facilities in national forests. These facilities are operated by commercial providers who help the public in a way that would not otherwise be helped by the U.S. Forest Service. The U.S. Forest Service does not run the facility itself and is not the one providing the benefits that the commercial business provides. Special-use permits have also been issued for other purposes, such as in Alaska during the summer of 2015, when special fishing permits were issued to feed firefighters who had difficulty receiving supplies via land routes due to the forest fires that they were fighting in remote areas.

In broadcasting, a restricted service licence (UK) or special temporary authority (US) may be issued by a broadcasting authority for temporary changes or set-ups for a radio station or television station. This may be for a temporary LPFM station for a special event (an RSL), or for an unexpected situation such as having to operate at low power from an emergency radio antenna or radio tower after a disaster or major equipment failure (STA).

== See also ==
- Zoning
- Zoning in the United States (land use)
- Variance (land use)
- Spot zoning
