= Nonconforming use =

Nonconforming use in urban planning the use of land that was authorised at the time the use was created but is no longer allowed due to changes made to the zoning restrictions after that time. Secondary suites are commonly permitted as a non-conforming use in the zoning district they are located in because the suite was developed prior to the zoning ordinance coming into effect.

== Discontinuance ==
=== Intent ===
The landowner may explicitly intend to discontinue the use by agreeing to end the use.

Implied intent exists if the landowner fails to exercise the nonconforming use. If the landowner discontinues the nonconforming use after a specified period, commonly 21 years in many jurisdictions but shorter in many others, then the nonconforming use will be terminated and parcel will become subject to the zoning requirements of the area in which it is located. Such a discontinuance of the use implies the intent to abandon the use.

=== Partial destruction ===
In some jurisdictions, if the structure exercising the nonconforming use is destroyed beyond a certain percentage (usually 50%) it cannot be rebuilt or repaired. Instead, the parcel becomes subject to the applicable zoning regulations thereby ending the nonconforming use's reprieve from the zoning regulations. In others, by statute usually allowed to rebuild within a limited period. If dwelling, usually permitted to rebuild.

=== Replacement of non-conforming mobile homes ===
Local governments may, and often do, prohibit the replacement of older non-conforming mobile homes with newer non-conforming mobile homes because the replacement tends to perpetuate and extend the time the non-conforming use continues. See e.g. Lincoln County North Carolina. Code §10.2.3; Linn County, Iowa Code Art. 3, sec.1 para.6; Davenport Florida City Code §5.01.04.

=== Amortization ===
Some states allow amortization of the nonconforming use whereby the nonconforming use's immediate value is amortized over the course of a set period and once the value of the nonconforming reaches zero the nonconforming use ends. Normally such an ordinance is upheld unless it is arbitrary or discriminatory or unreasonable, and it is usually limited to certain uses and outside of those uses it may be an unreasonable exercise of police power. A reasonable exercise of an amortization end of the nonconforming use allows for a complete return on the investment.

Many property-rights advocacy groups are critical of amortization, because it forces property owners to cease a previously lawful use without providing them with any compensation. In some states, amortization of a nonconforming use is unconstitutional.

== See also ==
- Grandfather clause
- Zoning
- Zoning in the United States (land use)
- Variance (land use)
- Spot zoning
- Special use permit
