= New Jersey Planning Officials =

American non-profit organization

The New Jersey Planning Officials (NJPO) is a non-profit organization that represents Zoning Board of Adjustments and Planning Boards throughout the State of New Jersey. NJPO was established in November 1938 as the Federation of Official Planning Boards. In 1939 NJFPB was welcomed as an affiliate of the New Jersey State League of Municipalities (NJSLOM). In 1964, to better reflect representation of both planning boards and zoning boards of adjustment the New Jersey Federation of Planning Boards was renamed to The New Jersey Federation of Planning Officials. And finally, in 1992 the name was changed to The New Jersey Planning Officials, Inc.

In 1939 the organization published the first Statewide planning newsletter: New Jersey Planner. This first newsletter announced the first annual planning conference. In 2012, the New Jersey Planner was expanded to a 16-page periodical that is distributed to over 7,000 board members throughout the state.

Since 1984, the New Jersey Planning Officials has reproduced the Municipal Land Use law in a convenient booklet.

In 1988 the Governor of New Jersey, Thomas Kean, declared the week of April 24–30, 1988 as "Planning Week" in New Jersey on behalf of NJPO's 50th anniversary.

In 1989 NJPO proudly accepted the New Jersey Association of Planning and Zoning Administrators as an affiliate of NJPO. NJAPZA is an educational resource to municipal land use administrators and zoning officers.
