= Agricultural zoning =

Agricultural zoning is a United States land management tool that refers to local zoning designations made by United States local jurisdictions that are intended to protect farmland and farming activities from incompatible land uses. Agricultural zoning can specify many factors, such as the uses allowed, minimum lot size, the number of nonfarm dwellings allowed, or the size of a buffer separating farm and nonfarm properties. Some jurisdictions further subdivide agricultural zones to distinguish industrial farming from uses like rural residence farms and retirement farms on large lots.

One example of such zoning is the Agricultural Reserve in Montgomery County, Maryland. The reserve was established in 1980 to preserve farmland and rural space. This unique reserve contains farms that produced farm-to-table products for the local community, lessening the burden of outside pressures of cost of living.

== Exclusive Agricultural Zoning ==
Exclusive Agricultural Zoning (EAZ) was adopted at the time to control the mount of non-farm development in agricultural zones and their location. EAZ requires approval from the county and township which comes quickly when it is passed by local governments that are primarily dominated by farmers. In 1989, EAZ covered 6.3 million acres of land in portions of 43 states in agricultural and densely populated areas. Conflict between dwellings and farm uses is minimized through EAZ, but the regulations upheld by EAZ makes nonfarm uses more restrictive and validity of uses depend on public purpose.

While EAZ is strict with their non-farm uses, non-EAZ becomes an alternative method as it doesn't prohibit non-farm use but it discourages non-farm activities instead. Non-EAZ allows for the use of dwellings to be run by non-agricultural teams, but limits the number of dwellings created. The requirement for non-EAZ to a have a large amount of lot sizes allow for confirm landowners to build dwellings within these zones. The non-farm dwellings in these zones must meet the specified criteria established by the local government that is compatible with the local agricultural uses within the zone.

== Opposition to EAZ ==
Activist groups were hostile to EAZ practices beginning in the 1960s wanting to limit the role of general zoning on the impact of maintaining economic and racial segregation in urban cities. Following the civil rights movement and war on poverty, activist groups went to state Supreme Courts in hopes of overturning agricultural zoning that inhibited the growth of housing projects. The Supreme Court struck down the case, opting to endorse local prerogatives for agricultural zoning. It wasn't until 1978 when state Supreme Courts in New York, New Jersey, and Pennsylvania struck down zoning in municipalities that restricted opportunities for metropolitan housing.

Old zoning projects in the 1970s, otherwise known as 'control growth' efforts, had support from local governments where they were implemented. Opposition came from the people when old zoning projects transitioned to be qualified under movements working towards protecting the environment. Criticism for the movement rose because some agricultural zoning groups were using environmental rhetoric that wasn't truthful to the movement. With the purpose of agricultural zoning to protect the future food supply, protection of zones and farmlands in urban areas were proved to be difficult when local governments shift away from the original purpose of the movement and towards economic prosperity.

== Farmer concerns ==
While some farmers welcomed agricultural zoning and saw it as an opportunity for agricultural development for their advantage, there was some concerns for the zoning projects as they reduced land prices. There was growing animosity between city planners and farmers wishing to sell their land because agricultural zoning had become a common form of land-use control. It wasn't until the 1970s when farmers began to favor the spread of agricultural zoning after noticing that the alternative to agricultural zoning could impact a rapid demise of the farming industry.

== Property rights of agricultural land ==
With the widespread adoption of agricultural zoning across the country, a new system of property rights for farmland was developed. There were two types of property rights that were implemented: individual and collective. Individual pertained rights for agricultural use of land and maintenance of farm residencies while collective had the right to convert farmland into residential development. This conversion was to be done within a certain proximity to metropolitan cities that maintain existing farming that would fall threat to residential intrusion. Outside of metropolitan areas, there was a push to adopt agricultural zoning for farmland in rural areas. To be included in 'agricultural preserve' initiatives, the agricultural zones with minimum lots of 40 acres or more were favorable for tax treatment and special support specifically for agriculture. This was favorable for rural areas that were suffering agriculturally and looking for government support for a resurgence in the food supply industry.

== Case studies ==
=== New York ===
Law was established in New York which successfully set up agricultural zoning in segregating farm and conform uses. Initially, before the establishment of agricultural zones, there was a formal designation of special agricultural districts across the state. Following the updated law, local governments across the state were to have no control over zoning, allowing for the facilitation of co-existence between farm and non-farm uses. This led to lowering of property taxes, creating an incentive for landowners to adapt EAZ practices in order to reduce their taxes while participating. This allowed for the protection of high property taxes while increasing investments in farming techniques and equipment.

=== Oregon ===
The Urban Growth Boundary (UGB) is used for urban development and establishing the preservation of surrounding land. Oregon decided to integrate UGB into their agricultural movement, with the goal to preserve green spaces in urban areas and surrounding farmlands. Outside of UBG, there are designated areas that call for exclusive farm use (EFU). All land outside of UBG is classified as EFU, making zoning required to establish the difference in areas. EFU protects the agricultural land by requiring government interference. The push for adoption for local zoning regulations for agricultural zoning became difficult overtime as local governments failed to implement agricultural zoning plans properly or at all.

== See also ==
- Farmland protection
- Zoning in the United States
