= Spot zoning =

System of land use regulation

Spot zoning is the application of zoning to a specific parcel or parcels of land within a larger zoned area when the rezoning is usually at odds with a city's master plan and current zoning restrictions. Spot zoning may be ruled invalid as an "arbitrary, capricious and unreasonable treatment" of a limited parcel of land by a local zoning ordinance. While zoning regulates the land use in whole districts, spot zoning makes unjustified exceptions for a parcel or parcels within a district.

The small size of the parcel is not the sole defining characteristic of a spot zone. Rather, the defining characteristic is the narrowness and unjustified nature of the benefit to the particular property owner, to the detriment of a general land use plan or public goals. The rezoning may provide unjustified special treatment that benefits a particular owner, while undermining the pre-existing rights and uses of adjacent property owners. This would be called an instance of spot zoning. On the other hand, a change in zoning for a small land area may not be a spot zone, if it is consistent with, and furthers the purposes of the general area plan.

For example, a small zone allowing limited commercial uses such as a corner store within a residential area may not be a spot zone, but a carve-out for an industrial use or a night club might be considered a case of spot zoning. In the first case, the differing land uses are mutually compatible and supportive. In the latter case, the residential nature of the area would be harmed by a conflicting land use.

When the change in zoning does not advance a general public purpose in land use, courts may rule certain instances of spot zoning as illegal. The Standard State Zoning Enabling Act states "all such regulations shall be uniform for each class or kind of building throughout each district." It may also be an invalid exercise of authority, if spot zoning is not a right conferred upon the body by the state's zoning enabling statute, because it deviates from the plan set out by the enabling statute.

Special zoning treatment may have a legitimate use, however, such as when a community wishes to have more local control of land use. This may occur in a rural county which has no zoning at all, where a village or hamlet may wish to maintain its characteristic feel and historic appeal (often to protect tourism), without adding another layer of local government and taxes by creating a municipality. The county designates the boundaries (often that of an already census-designated place) and maintain regulations through the county commission instead of a separate town council.

== Authority ==
Generally, zoning is a constitutional exercise of a state's police power to protect public health, safety, and welfare. Therefore, spot zoning (or any zoning enactment) would be unconstitutional to the extent that it contradicts or fails to advance a legitimate public purpose, such as promotion of community welfare or protection of other properties.

Spot zoning would be a constitutional exercise of zoning power by a local zoning authority if the state zoning enabling law allows spot zoning. Conversely, spot zoning may be an invalid exercise of a local authority's zoning power if the state zoning enabling law prohibits spot zoning.

== Situations where spot zoning may arise ==
=== Variance ===
A variance is the license to deviate from the land-use restrictions imposed by the zoning ordinance. A variance usually requires the landowner suffer a substantial hardship which only the granting of a variance may remedy. If a local zoning authority decides to grant a variance to a landowner who lacks substantial hardship, then its legality (regarding equal protection) may be called into question.

=== Special-use permit ===
A special-use permit occurs when a zoning regulations allows some specific exception to its regulations provided that a landowner receive a special-use permit from the local zoning authority. An example of a specific exception includes a church in a residential neighborhood. If the special-use permit deviates from zoning ordinance or the enabling statute, then an instance of spot zoning arises.

=== Amendment to ordinance ===
A local zoning authority like a city may seek to amend its zoning ordinance. If it amends it zoning ordinance but only for a parcel within a district and the parcel has a different land use characterization than the surrounding district, then an instance of spot zoning arises.

=== Contract zoning ===
Contract zoning occurs when a local zoning authority accommodates a private interest by rezoning a district or a parcel of land within that district. Then the private interest may then be allowed to develop the land where before the zoning regulations prohibited such a land use. Contract zoning is usually illegal, in contrast with permissible conditional use (also known as special use) zoning.

== See also ==
- Bill of attainder
- Zoning
