= Zoning in the United States =

Provision in urban planning in the United States

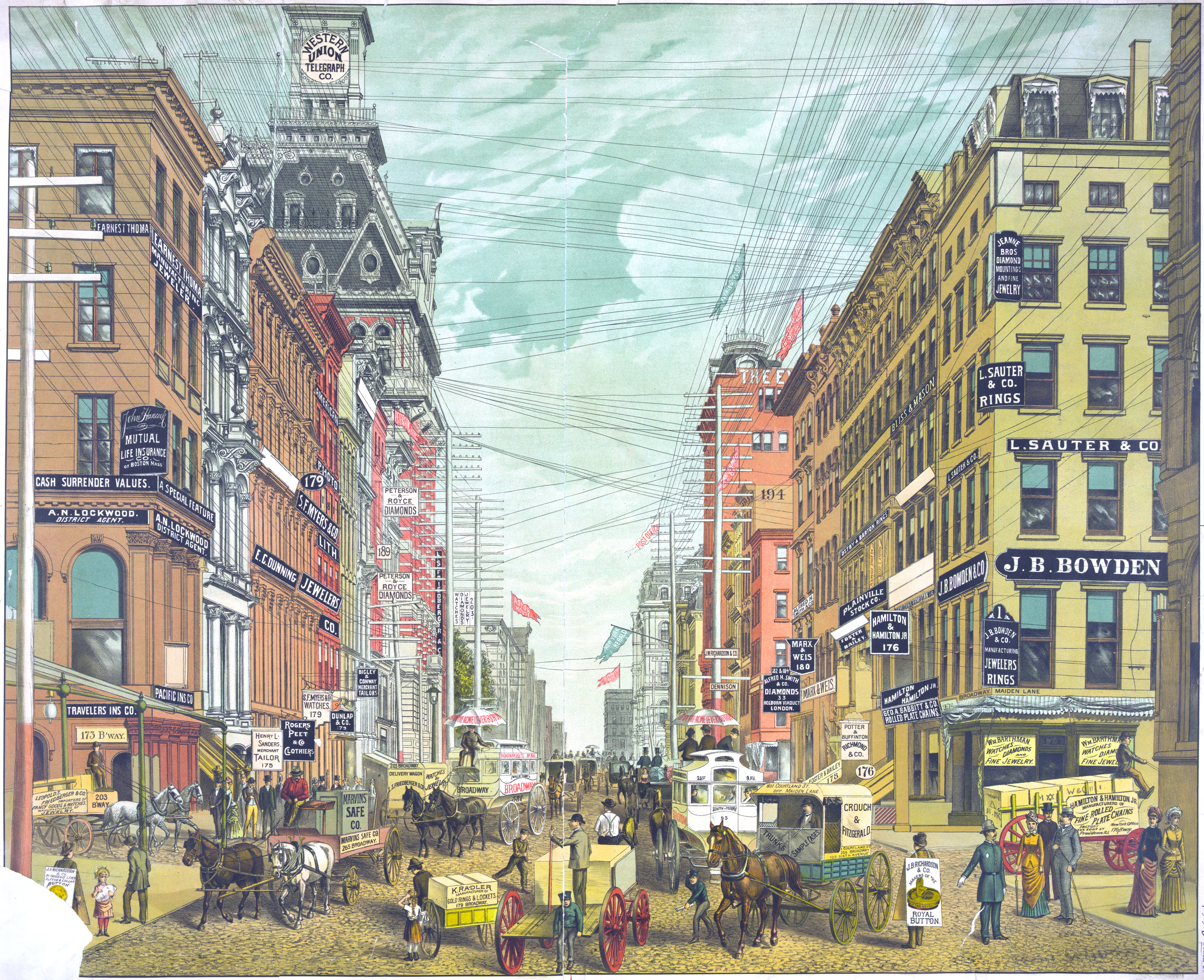
Unsightly wires were among the targets of late nineteenth century agitation for zoning.

Zoning is a system of laws that divides a jurisdiction's land into districts, or zones, and limits how land in each district can be used. In the United States, zoning includes various land use laws enforced through the police power rights of state governments (often delegated to their local governments) to exercise authority over privately owned real property.

Zoning laws in major cities originated with the New York City 1916 Zoning Resolution. Before zoning, some cities had local ordinances like those in Los Angeles in 1904 limiting laundries (commonly referred to as "wash houses") from operating in a residential area. These early city ordinances were in some cases motivated by racism and classism.

After the Supreme Court declared racial ordinances unconstitutional in 1917, many localities discovered zoning and began setting down citywide restrictions. In suburban localities, zoning often mandates single-family housing. Though not always explicitly discriminatory, zoning ordinances were often applied in ways that prevented African Americans from moving into predominantly white neighborhoods, under the belief that their presence would lower property values. The constitutionality of zoning ordinances was upheld by the Supreme Court of the United States in Village of Euclid, Ohio v. Ambler Realty Co. in 1926.

According to the New York Times, "single-family zoning is practically gospel in America", as a vast number of cities zone land extensively for detached single-family homes. Low-density residential zoning is far more predominant in U.S. cities than in other countries. The housing shortage in many metropolitan areas, coupled with racial residential segregation, has growing public attention and political debate on zoning laws. Studies indicate that strict zoning regulations constrain the supply of housing and inflate housing prices, increase homelessness, and contribute to inequality, a weaker economy, and racial housing segregation in the United States.

Zoning laws that prioritize single-family housing have raised concerns regarding housing availability, housing affordability and environmental harms. In the U.S., support for local zoning against multifamily housing is concentrated among white, affluent homeowners. There are no substantial differences between liberal and conservative homeowners in their opposition to the construction of dense housing in their neighborhoods. However, among the mass public and elected officials, Democratic constituencies are more likely to support dense, multi-family housing.

Some estimates suggest that restrictive zoning in the United States may result in hundreds of billions to over a trillion dollars per year in lost economic output.

== Origins and history ==
Some scholars trace that German urban planner Reinhard Baumeister was the first to develop a system of land use separation that influenced later zoning practices. Frankfurt's nineteenth century zoning plans served as models for urban planning in the United States and other countries in Western Europe.

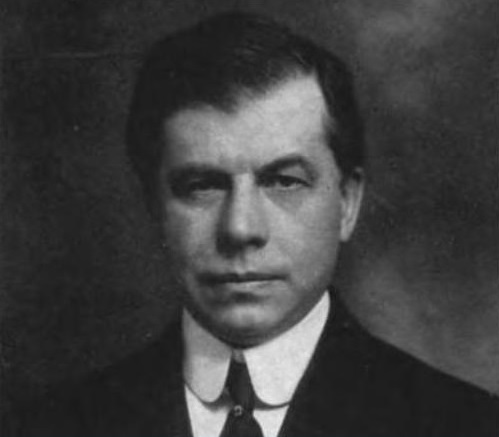
Edward Murray Bassett, "the father of American zoning"

The perceived need for formal zoning in America arose at the turn of the twentieth century, as rapidly growing cities like New York faced challenges, experiencing rapid urbanization and growth in industry, felt a growing need to reduce congestion, stabilize property values, combat poor urban design, and protect residents from issues such as crowded living conditions, outbreaks of disease, and industrial pollution, through legal means. Edward M. Bassett, author of the first comprehensive zoning ordinance in the United States, wrote in 1922:

Skyscrapers would be built to unnecessary height, their cornices projecting into the street and shutting out light and air. The lower floors needed artificial light in the daytime. Business centers instead of being rationally spread out were intensively congested. Transit and street facilities were overwhelmed...

Additionally, many of the earliest zoning laws in the United States were influenced by efforts to enforce class-, ethnic-, and race-based segregation. Early zoning ordinances in the United States were narrower in scope and later became more comprehensive. Modesto, California's 1885 ordinance banning wash houses from certain areas of the city is often cited to be America's first true zoning ordinance. Richmond's 1908 zoning ordinance regulating the height and arrangement of buildings was upheld by the Virginia Supreme Court of Appeals in 1910, a decision used as precedent in the implementation of New York City's 1916 Zoning Resolution.

=== 1904–1930 ===
==== Los Angeles, 1904-1909 ====
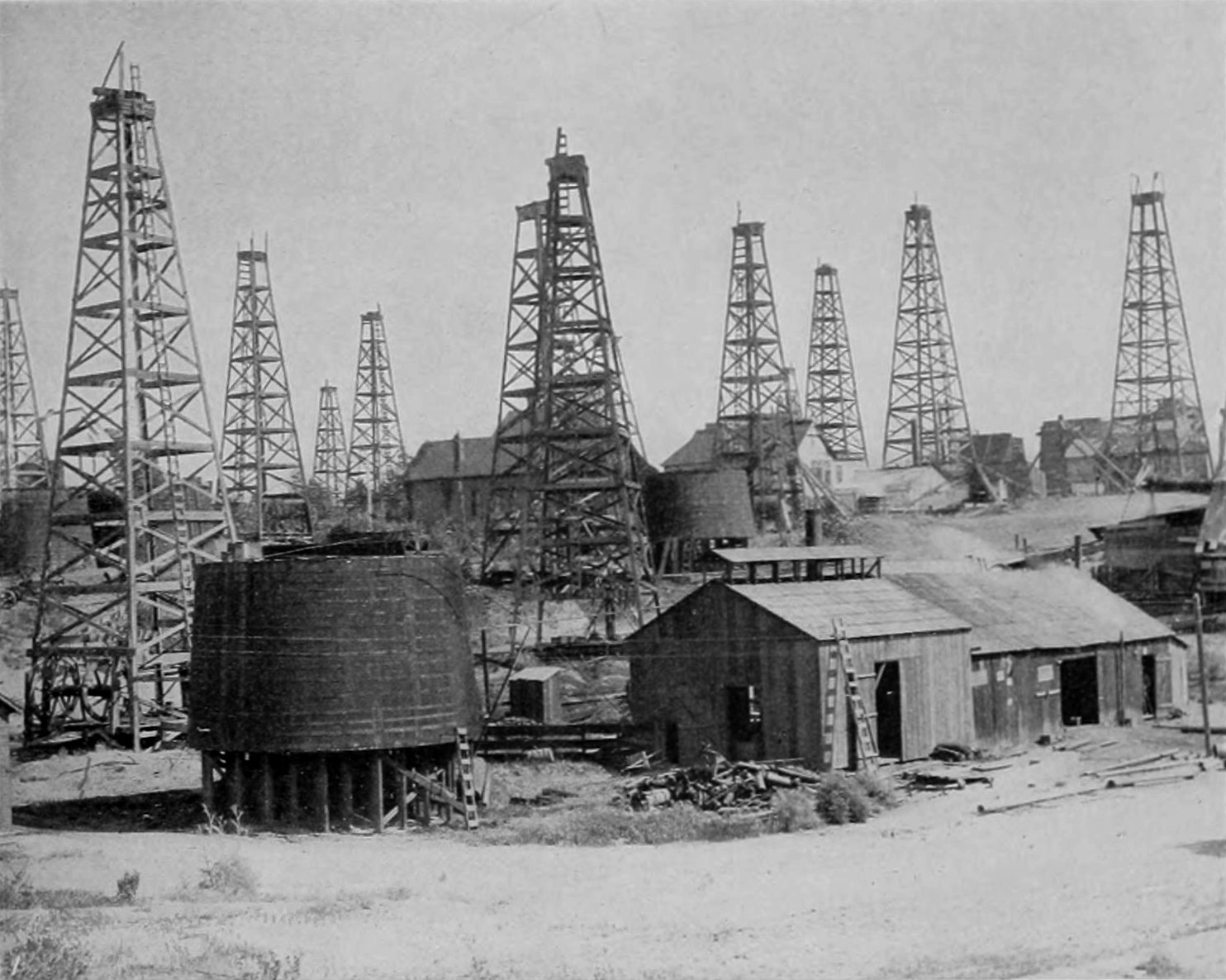
Oil drilling operations in Los Angeles, 1905

Zoning in Los Angeles is commonly believed to have been first enacted in 1908, although Los Angeles City Council passed the first municipal zoning ordinance in the United States, Ordinance 9774, on July 25, 1904. Though the ordinance did not assign all parts of the city to a zoning map, as with later American ordinances, it did establish three residential districts in which laundries and wash houses were prohibited. The prohibition against laundries had a racial component since many were owned by Chinese residents and citizens. This ordinance would later be replaced in 1908 with other ordinances that expanded the scope of the residential districts and greatly expanded the scope of prohibited industries. Existing nuisance laws had already prohibited some industrial land uses in Los Angeles. Dangerous businesses (such as warehousing explosives) were illegal before 1908, as were odorous land uses, such as slaughterhouses and tanneries. The California Supreme Court had already upheld such rules in Yick Wo (1886). Many later California court cases supported the 1908 ordinances, even in one case of ex post facto relocation of an existing brickyard.

Ordinance 16170, adopted on September 16, 1908, established six industrial districts. These were drawn mainly in areas which had already hosted significant industrial development such as corridors along the freight railroads and the Los Angeles River. A new ordinance adopted on August 3, 1909, established that all land within Los Angeles that was not part of an industrial district would become a residence district. However, between 1909 and 1915, Los Angeles City Council responded to some requests by business interests to create exceptions to industrial bans within the three residential districts. They did this through the legal device of districts within districts. While some might have been benign, such as motion picture districts, some others were polluting, such as poultry slaughterhouse districts. Despite the expanding list of exceptions, new ordinances in other cities (i.e., 1914 Oakland ordinance) followed the 1908 Los Angeles model through about 1917. By 1913, twenty-two cities had zoning ordinances.

==== Race-based zoning ordinances, 1910–1917 ====
Many American cities passed residential segregation laws based on race between 1910 and 1917. Baltimore City Council passed such a law in December 1910. Unlike the Los Angeles Residential District which created well-defined areas for residential land use, the Baltimore scheme was implemented on a block-by-block basis. Druid Hill had already existed as a de facto all-black neighborhood, but some whites in nearby neighborhoods protested for formal segregation. Just a few months later, Richmond, Virginia passed its race-based zoning law, which was upheld by the Supreme Court of Virginia in the 1915 case Hopkins v. City of Richmond. Over the next few years, several southern cities established race-based residential zoning ordinances, including four other cities in Virginia, one in North Carolina, and another in South Carolina. Atlanta passed a law similar to 1910 Baltimore ordinance. Before 1918, race-based zoning ordinances were adopted in New Orleans, Louisville, St. Louis, and Oklahoma City.

In the end, the United States Supreme Court struck down the Louisville ordinance, ruling in Buchanan v. Warley that race-based zoning was a violation of the Fourteenth Amendment; more specifically, the Court held that the law violated the "right to contract" and the right to alienate property. Despite the Buchanan ruling, the city of Atlanta devised a new race-based zoning ordinance, arguing that the Supreme Court had merely applied to specific defects of the Louisville ordinance. Even after the Georgia Supreme Court struck down the Atlanta ordinance, the city continued to use their racially based residential zoning maps. Other municipalities tested the limits of Buchanan; Florida, Apopka and West Palm Beach drafted race-based residential zoning ordinances. Birmingham, Indianapolis, and New Orleans all passed race-based zoning laws, while Atlanta, Austin, Kansas City, Missouri, and Norfolk considered race in their "spot zoning" decisions. In some cases, these practices continued for decades after Buchanan.

While not explicitly race-based, it is believed that Berkeley, California is where single-family zoning first originated, as an effort to keep minorities out of white neighborhoods.

==== 1916 New York Zoning Resolution ====
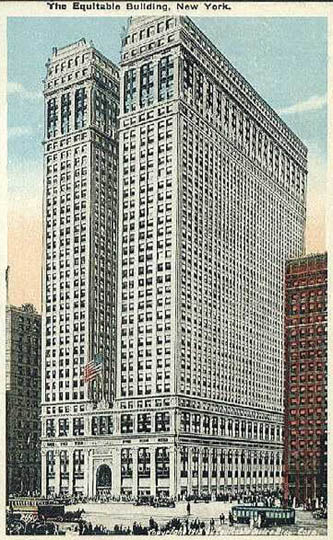
Early postcard picturing the Equitable Building

Graph of the 1916 New York City zoning ordinance with an example elevation for an 80-foot street in a 2½-times height district

In 1916, New York City adopted the first zoning regulations to apply citywide as a reaction to construction of the Equitable Building (which still stands at 120 Broadway). The building towered over the neighboring residences, completely covering all available land area within the property boundary, blocking windows of neighboring buildings and diminishing the availability of sunshine for the people in the affected area.

Bassett's zoning map established height restrictions for the entire city, expressed as ratios between maximum building height and the width of adjacent streets. Residential zones were the most restrictive, limiting building height to no higher than the width of adjoining streets. The law also regulated land use, preventing factories and warehousing from encroaching on retail districts.

These laws, written by a commission headed by Edward Bassett and signed by Mayor John Purroy Mitchel, became the blueprint for zoning in the rest of the country, partly because Bassett headed the group of planning lawyers who wrote The Standard State Zoning Enabling Act that was issued by the U.S. Department of Commerce in 1924 and accepted almost without change by most states. The effect of these zoning regulations on the shape of skyscrapers was illustrated famously by architect and illustrator Hugh Ferriss.

==== Standard State Zoning Enabling Act ====
The Standard State Zoning Enabling Act (SZEA) is a federal planning document first drafted and published through the United States Commerce Department in 1922, which gave states a model under which they could enact their own zoning enabling laws. The genesis for this act is the initiative of Herbert Hoover while he was Secretary of Commerce. Deriving from a general policy to increase home ownership in the United States, Secretary Hoover established the Advisory Committee on Zoning, which was assigned the task of drafting model zoning statutes. This committee was later known as the Advisory Committee on City Planning and Zoning. Among the members of this committee were Edward Bassett, Alfred Bettman, Morris Knowles, Nelson Lewis, Frederick Law Olmsted Jr., and Lawrence Veiller.

The Advisory Committee on Zoning appointed a subcommittee under the title of "Laws and Ordinances." This committee—which included Bassett, Knowles, Lewis, and Veiller—composed a series of drafts for SZEA, with one dated as early as December 15, 1921. A second draft came forth from the subcommittee in January 1922. Several drafts culminated in the first published document in 1924, which was revised and republished in 1926.

==== Initial reception ====
During their inception, zoning laws were harshly criticized as an overreach of government power. Some believed that they were an unjust restriction of private action, while others believed that the power of zoning would be corrupted in the hands of bureaucrats. General P. Lincoln Mitchell went as far as to call zoning laws "an advanced form of communism." Others supported zoning laws for their uniform and consistent application, and believed that they would be a force of social equality. The constitutionality of zoning laws was highly debated until the ruling of Village of Euclid v. Ambler Realty.

==== Village of Euclid v. Ambler Realty Co. ====
The constitutionality of zoning ordinances was upheld by the U.S. Supreme Court in Village of Euclid, Ohio v. Ambler Realty Co. in 1926. The zoning ordinance of Euclid, Ohio was challenged in court by a local land owner on the basis that restricting use of property violated the Fourteenth Amendment to the United States Constitution. Ambler Realty Company filed suit on November 13, 1922, against the Village of Euclid, Ohio, alleging that the local zoning ordinances effectively diminished its property values. The village had zoned an area of land held by Ambler Realty as a residential neighborhood. Ambler argued that it would lose money because if the land could be leased to industrial users it would have netted a great deal more money than as a residential area. Ambler Realty claimed these breaches implied an unconstitutional taking of property and denied equal protection under the law.

The trial court originally ruled in Ambler's favor, holding zoning unconstitutional. Among other reasons, the trial court found that zoning was an illegitimate device to facilitate social and economic segregation. Nonetheless, the U.S. Supreme Court reversed that decision, holding that zoning was a nuisance-preventing device, and as such a proper exercise of the state regulatory police power.

==== Houston, 1924–1929 ====
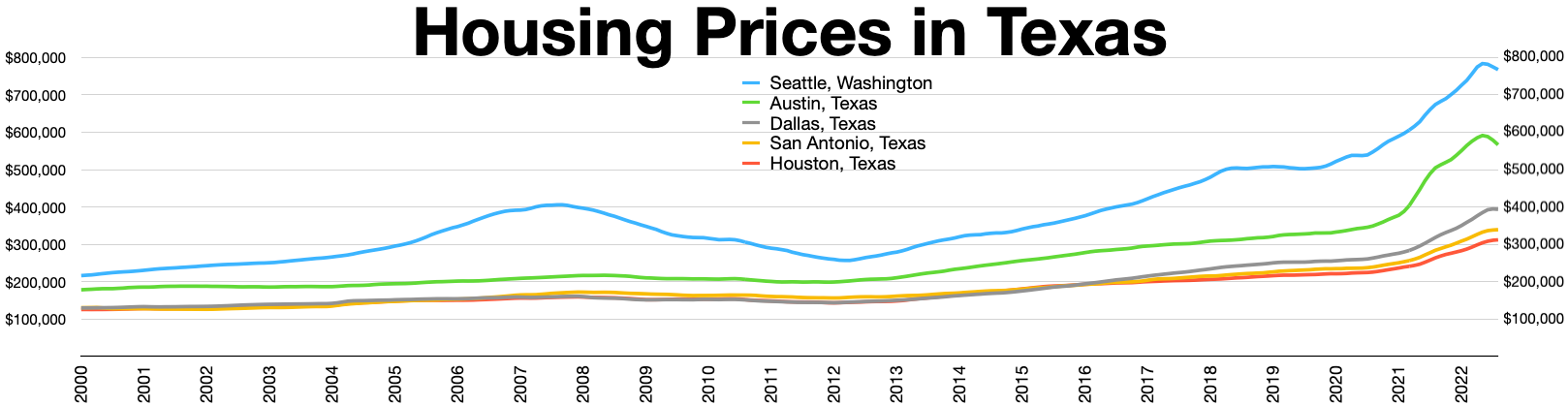
Texas housing prices compared to Seattle Seattle, Washington Austin, Texas Dallas, Texas San Antonio, Texas Houston, Texas

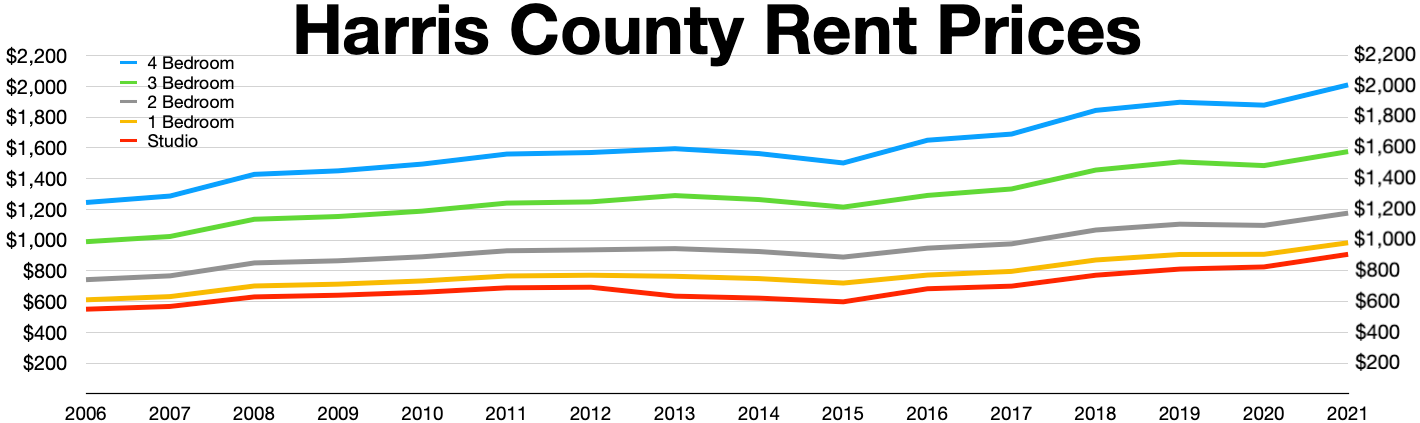
Harris County rent prices (Houston Metro Area) 4 bedroom 3 bedroom 2 bedroom 1 bedroom Studio

Houston remains an exception within the United States because it never adopted a zoning ordinance. However, strong support existed for zoning in Houston among elements within municipal government and among the city's elites during the 1920s. In 1924, Mayor Oscar Holcombe, appointed the first funded City Planning Commission. City Council voted in favor of hiring S. Herbert Hare of Hare and Hare as a planning consultant. Following the passage of a state zoning enabling statute in 1927, Holcombe appointed Will Hogg to chair a new City Planning Commission. Will Hogg was a co-founder of the River Oaks development, the son of a former Texas Governor and an heir to family oil wealth. By 1929, both Hare and Hogg abandoned efforts to push the zoning ordinance to a referendum. In their estimation, there was not enough support for it. Hogg resigned as chair of the City Planning Commission that year.

=== 1931–2000 ===
==== Houston, 1948–1993 ====
Houston is the largest city in the country with no zoning ordinances. Houston voters have rejected efforts to implement zoning in 1948, 1962, and 1993. Houston is similar, however, to other large cities throughout the Sun Belt, who all experienced the bulk of their population growth during the Age of the Automobile. The largest of these cities, such as Los Angeles, Atlanta, Miami, Tampa, Dallas, Phoenix, and Kansas City, have all expanded their metropolitan footprints along with Houston while having land use zoning.

While Houston has no official zoning ordinances, many private properties have legal covenants or "deed restrictions" that limit the future uses of land, with effects similar to those of zoning systems.

Also, the city has enacted development regulations that specify how lots are subdivided, standard setbacks, and parking requirements. The regulations have contributed to the city's automobile-dependent sprawl, by requiring the existence of large minimum residential lot sizes and large commercial parking lots.

==== Mid 20th Century ====
During the mid-twentieth century, use-based zoning became flatter, and hierarchical provisions that allowed residential uses in industrial areas became less common. Zoning districts also became larger, increasing the distance between properties zoned for different uses.

=== 21st century ===
In the early 21st century, several local and state governments across the United States have been relaxing or abolishing specific zoning classes (e.g. single-family zoning) to address various issues that have arisen as a result of zoning, such as housing affordability crises and racial and socio-economic segregation. In addition, federal legislation to reform exclusionary zoning has been proposed by national politicians from both the Republican and Democratic parties since at least the 2010s.

==== California ====
In September 2021, the state of California adopted Senate Bill 9 allowing the development of up to four residential units on single-family lots, following a growing push from local governments such as Berkeley (set to phase out single-family zoning by December 2022), San Jose and other cities across the state.

==== Massachusetts ====
In 2000, Republican governor Paul Cellucci of Massachusetts passed the Community Preservation Act for housing affordability. In 2004, Republican governor Mitt Romney adopted the 40R law which provided financial incentives to cities, suburbs, and towns to adopt zoning legislation for new rental and condo units around rail stations. In 2012, Democratic governor Deval Patrick expanded 40R with Compact Neighborhoods, incentivizing zoning for denser, multifamily housing near rail and transit hubs across the Commonwealth. In November 2017, Republican governor Charlie Baker introduced the Housing Choice reform (adopted in January 2021), including relaxing the requirement of a two-thirds majority to a simple majority at the local level to pass zoning amendments for new housing, a requirement for 175 cities and towns in the Greater Boston area to rezone land for denser, multi-family housing near MBTA stations, and financial means of compliance to new zoning regulations on top of existing incentives. Unlike California, where the state legislature has taken a more leading role in local zoning reform, the focus in Massachusetts is on local government control of zoning policy changes; both approaches have their advantages and disadvantages. In February 2024, residents in the Town of Milton, a Boston suburb, voted to not comply with the law. Massachusetts Attorney General Andrea Joy Campbell has filed suit to force compliance. The Boston Globe has characterized efforts to update zoning codes as a "political minefield" for Boston Mayor Michelle Wu.

==== Minneapolis ====
On December 7, 2018, Minneapolis in Minnesota became the first U.S. city to decide to completely phase out exclusionary single-family zoning policies (then covering 70% of its residential land) in three stages. It also planned to allow construction of new three-to-six story buildings near transit stops, abolish off-street minimum parking requirements (the fourth U.S. city to do so), require new apartment developments to set aside 10% of units for moderate-income households, and to increase funding for affordable housing to combat homelessness and support low-income renters. Aside from increasing housing affordability and reducing racial and economic segregation, reducing commutes and making housing more environmentally friendly was an additional stated purpose.

==== Oregon ====
The House Bill 2001, adopted by the Oregon Senate in a 17–9 vote on June 30, 2019, effectively eliminated single-family zoning in large Oregonian cities. Towns with at least 10,000 residents were required to allow the development of duplexes in single-family zones, while cities with over 25,000 residents and a few smaller places in the Portland metropolitan area also had to permit triplexes, fourplexes, and "cottage clusters" (several small homes around a common yard) in addition to duplexes on land that had until then been reserved for single-family homes.

== Scope ==
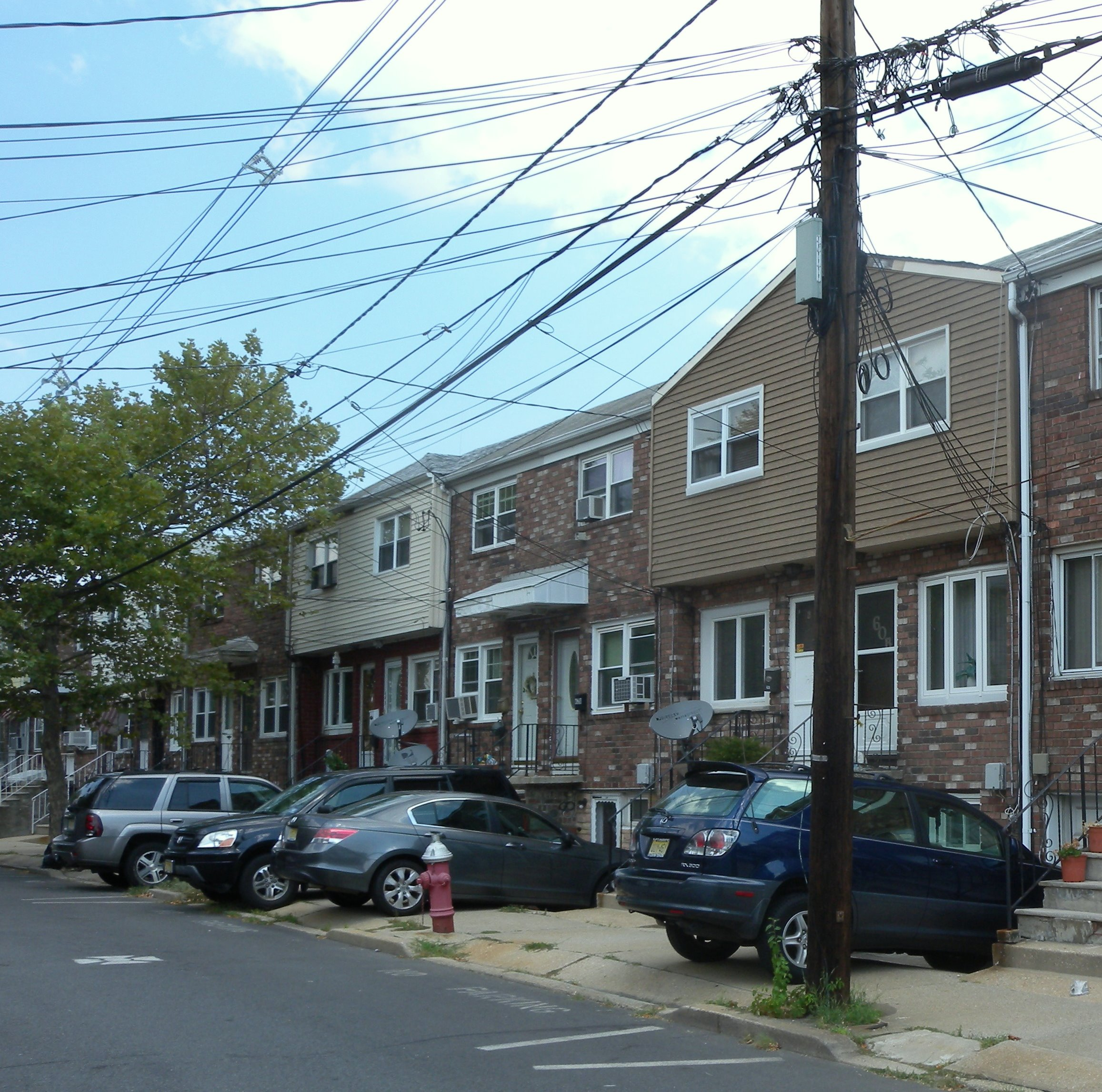
Parking provision is sometimes specified.

Theoretically, the primary purpose of zoning is to segregate uses that are thought to be incompatible and provide stability to property values. In practice, zoning is also used as a permitting system to prevent new development from harming existing residents or businesses. Zoning is commonly exercised by local governments such as counties or municipalities, although the state determines the nature of the zoning scheme with a zoning enabling law. Federal lands are not subject to state planning controls.

Zoning may include regulation of the kinds of activities that will be acceptable on particular lots (such as open space, residential, agricultural, commercial, or industrial), the densities at which those activities may be performed (from low-density housing such as single family homes to high-density such as high-rise apartment buildings), the height of buildings, the amount of space structures may occupy, the location of a building on the lot (setbacks), the proportions of the types of space on a lot (for example, how much landscaped space and how much paved space), and how much parking must be provided). Some commercial zones specify what types of products may be sold by particular stores.

== Implementation ==
Most zoning systems have a procedure for granting variances (exceptions to the zoning rules), usually because of some perceived hardship due to the particular nature of the property in question. If the variance is not warranted, then it may cause an allegation of spot zoning to arise. Most state zoning-enabling laws prohibit local zoning authorities from engaging in any spot zoning because it would undermine the purpose of a zoning scheme.

Zoning laws in different jurisdictions can each specify their rules using their own systems. Although there are some general patterns, such as abbreviations starting with R for residential, C for commercial, and I for industrial, zoning laws do not follow any single consistent system. As one example, residential zones in one city might be coded as R1 for single-family homes and R5 for multiple-family homes. In other places, the code R5 could refer to 5 residential housing units per acre or to homes on lots of at least 5,000 square feet.

== Legal challenges ==
There are several limitations to the ability of local governments in asserting police powers to control land use. First, constitutional constraints include freedom of speech (First Amendment), unjust takings of property through the use of zoning that denies land owners the ability to put their land to reasonable, income producing uses (Fifth Amendment), and equal protection (Fourteenth Amendment). There are also federal statutes that sometimes constrain local zoning. These include the Federal Housing Amendments Act of 1988, the Americans with Disabilities Act of 1990, and the Religious Land Use and Institutionalized Persons Act of 2000.

=== Freedom of speech ===
Local governments regulate signage on private property through zoning ordinances. Sometimes courts invalidate laws which regulate the content of speech rather than the manners and modes of speech. One court invalidated a local ordinance that prohibited "for sale" and "sold" signs on private property. Another court struck down a law which prohibited signs for adult cabarets.

=== Takings after 1987 ===
Beginning in 1987, several United States Supreme Court cases ruled against land use regulations as being a taking requiring just compensation pursuant to the Fifth Amendment to the Constitution. First English Evangelical Lutheran Church v. Los Angeles County ruled that even a temporary regulatory taking may require compensation. Nollan v. California Coastal Commission ruled that construction permit conditions that fail to substantially advance the agency's authorized purposes, require compensation. Lucas v. South Carolina Coastal Council ruled that numerous environmental concerns were not sufficient to deny all development without compensation. Dolan v. City of Tigard ruled that conditions of a permit must be roughly proportional to the adverse impacts of the proposed new development. Palazzolo v. Rhode Island ruled property rights are not diminished by unconstitutional laws that exist without challenge at the time the complaining property owner acquired title.

=== Equal protection ===
Specific zoning laws have been overturned in some other U.S. cases where the laws were not applied evenly (violating equal protection) or were considered to violate free speech. In the Atlanta suburb of Roswell, Georgia, an ordinance banning billboards was overturned in court the grounds that it unconstitutionally violated the right to freedom of speech. Cities are now advised not to regulate signs based on their content. Roswell has amended its sign ordinance to regulate signs based strictly on dimensional and aesthetic features rather than the sign content.

=== Religious exercise ===
On other occasions, religious institutions sought to circumvent zoning laws, citing the Religious Freedom Restoration Act of 1993 (RFRA). The Supreme Court eventually overturned RFRA in just such a case, City of Boerne v. Flores 521 U.S. 507 (1997). Congress enacted the Religious Land Use and Institutionalized Persons Act (RLUIPA) in 2000, however, in an effort to correct the constitutionally objectionable problems of the RFRA. RLUIPA has been found to be constitutional as applied to institutionalized persons in three United States Supreme Court cases (Cutter v. Wilkinson, Sossamon v. Texas, and Holt v. Hobbs), but as of 2020 no case had decided RLUIPA's constitutionality as it relates to religious land uses.

=== Wildlife sanctuaries ===
In early 2022, the town of Woodside, California drew widespread derision for declaring itself a "mountain lion habitat" to avoid state affordable housing requirements. It backed down on that attempt after California Attorney General Rob Bonta denied this claim. Bonta wrote: "There is no valid basis to claim that the entire town of Woodside is a habitat for mountain lions. Land that is already developed — with, for example a single-family home — is not, by definition, habitat. (...) Our message to local governments is simple: act in good faith, follow the law, and do your part to increase the housing supply." According to housing advocate Sonja Trauss, this was just one of about 40 cases in which Californian towns attempted to limit, block or discourage housing development to maintain exclusionary single-family zones in violation of Senate Bill 9 (SB9) adopted in September 2021.

== Types ==
Zoning codes have evolved over the years as urban planning theory has changed, legal constraints have fluctuated, and political priorities have shifted. The various approaches to zoning may be divided into four categories: Use-based (known as Euclidean in the US), performance, incentive, and form-based. Euclidean zoning codes with strict use separation are by far the most prevalent type in the United States. While the use of innovations such as form-based, performance, planned-unit development, and mixed-use zoning are common in the US, they tend to liberate relatively little land area from strict single-use zoning. Based on a survey of 25 cities, less than 5% of land allows mixed residential and commercial uses.

== Amendments to zoning regulations ==
Amendments to zoning regulations may be subject to judicial review, should such amendments be challenged as ultra vires or unconstitutional.

The standard applied to the amendment to determine whether it may survive judicial scrutiny is the same as the review of a zoning ordinance: whether the restriction is arbitrary or whether it bears a reasonable relationship to the exercise of the police power of the state.

If the residents in the targeted neighborhood complain about the amendment, their argument in court does not allow them any vested right to keep the zoned district the same. However, they do not have to prove the difficult standard that the amendment amounts to a taking. If the gain to the public for the rezoning is small compared to the hardships that would affect the residents, then the amendment may be granted if it provides relief to the residents.

If the local zoning authority passes the zoning amendment, then spot zoning allegations may arise should the rezoning be preferential in nature and not reasonably justified.

== Limitations and criticisms ==
Land-use zoning is a tool in the treatment of certain social ills and part of the larger concept of social engineering. There is criticism of zoning particularly amongst proponents of limited government or Laissez-faire political perspectives. The inherent danger of zoning, as a coercive force used against property owners seeking to build integrated housing, has been described in detail in Richard Rothstein's book The Color of Law (2017). Government zoning was used significantly as an instrument to advance racism through enforced segregation in all regions of the U.S., not only in the South, from the early part of the 20th century up until recent decades.

=== Circumventions ===
Generally, existing development in a community is not affected by the new zoning laws because it is "grandfathered" or legally non-conforming as a nonconforming use, meaning the prior development is exempt from compliance. Consequently, zoning may only affect new development in a growing community. In addition, if undeveloped land is zoned to allow development, that land becomes relatively expensive, causing developers to seek land that is not zoned for development with the intention to seek rezoning of that land. Communities generally react by not zoning undeveloped land to allow development until a developer requests rezoning and presents a suitable plan. Development under this practice appears to be piecemeal and uncoordinated. Communities try to influence the timing of development by government expenditures for new streets, sewers, and utilities usually desired for modern developments. Contrary to federal recommendations discouraging it, the development of interstate freeways for purposes unrelated to planned community growth, creates an inexorable rush to develop the relatively cheap land near interchanges. Property tax suppression measures such as California Proposition 13 led many communities desperate to capture sales tax revenue to disregard their comprehensive plans and rezone undeveloped land for retail establishments.

In Colorado, local governments are free to choose not to enforce their own zoning and other land regulation laws. This is called selective enforcement. Steamboat Springs, Colorado is an example of a location with illegal buildings and lax enforcement.

=== Housing affordability ===
Zoning also has been implicated as a primary driving factor in the rapidly accelerating lack of affordable housing in urban areas. One mechanism for this is zoning by many suburban and exurban communities for very large minimum residential lot and building sizes in order to preserve home values by limiting the total supply of housing, which thereby excludes poorer people. This shifts the market toward more expensive homes than ordinarily might be built. According to the Manhattan Institute, as much as half of the price paid for housing in some jurisdictions is directly attributable to the hidden costs of restrictive zoning regulation.

For example, the entire town of Los Altos Hills, California (with the exception of the local community college and a religious convent), is zoned for residential use with a minimum lot size of one acre (4,000 m^{2}) and a limit to only one primary dwelling per lot. All these restrictions were upheld as constitutional by federal and state courts in the early 1970s. The town traditionally attempted to comply with state affordable housing requirements by counting secondary dwellings (that is, apartments over garages and guest houses) as affordable housing, and since 1989 also has allowed residents to build so-called "granny units".

In 1969 Massachusetts enacted the Massachusetts Comprehensive Permit Act: Chapter 40B, originally referred to as the anti-snob zoning law. Under this statute, in municipalities with less than 10% affordable housing, a developer of affordable housing may seek waiver of local zoning and other requirements from the local zoning board of appeals, with review available from the state Housing Appeals Committee if the waiver is denied. Similar laws are in place in other parts of the United States (e.g., Rhode Island, Connecticut, and Illinois), although their effectiveness is disputed.

Critics of zoning note that zoning laws are a disincentive to provide housing which results in an increase in housing costs and a decrease in productive economic output. For example, A 2017 study showed that if all states deregulated their zoning laws only halfway to the level of Texas, a state known for low zoning regulations, their GDP would increase by 12 percent due to more productive workers and opportunity. Furthermore, critics note that it impedes the ability of those that wish to provide charitable housing from doing so. For example, in 2022, Gloversville's Free Methodist Church in New York wished to provide 40 beds for the homeless population in -4 degree weather and were inhibited from doing so.

==== Zoning tax ====
According to a 2021 study, in San Francisco, the "zoning tax" -which refers to the artificially inflated land prices brought on by tight residential zoning rules- is predicted to be more than $400,000 per home. The study found that the zoning tax in Seattle, New York City, and Los Angeles may reach $200,000. In Chicago, Philadelphia, Portland, and Washington, D.C., it reached $80,000.

=== Social ===
In more recent times, zoning has been criticized by urban planners and scholars (most notably Jane Jacobs) as a source of new social ills, including urban sprawl, the separation of homes from employment, and the rise of "car culture". Some communities have begun to encourage development of denser, homogenized, mixed-use neighborhoods that promote walking and cycling to jobs and shopping. Nonetheless, a single-family home and car are major parts of the "American Dream" for nuclear families, and zoning laws often reflect this: in some cities, houses that do not have an attached garage have been deemed "blighted" and are subject to redevelopment. Movements that disapprove of Euclidean zoning, such as New Urbanism and Smart Growth, generally try to reconcile these competing demands. New Urbanists in particular favor creative urban design solutions that hark back to 1920s and 1930s practices of hierarchical zoning, or form-based code.

=== Exclusionary ===
Zoning has long been criticized as a tool of racial and socio-economic exclusion and segregation, primarily through minimum lot-size requirements and land-use segregation. Early zoning codes often were explicitly racist, or designed to separate social classes.

Exclusionary practices remain common among suburbs wishing to keep out those deemed socioeconomically or ethnically undesirable: for example, representatives of the city of Barrington Hills, Illinois once told editors of the Real Estate section of the Chicago Tribune that the city's 5-acre (20,000 m^{2}) minimum lot size helped to "keep out the riff-raff."

Occupancy restrictions, such as those restricting the number of unrelated occupants that can occupy a single-family dwelling, have been criticized for their rigidity to traditional ideas of the nuclear family. Supreme Court Justice William O. Douglas argued in the case Village of Belle Terre v. Boraas that argued it was the objective of the state to preserve traditional family values, something critics have used as a pejorative against single-family zoning.

==== Racially-segregated zoning ====
Since 1910 in Baltimore, numerous U.S. States created racial zoning laws; however such laws were ruled out in 1917 when the U.S. Supreme Court ruled that such laws interfered with the property rights of owners (Buchanan v. Warley). There were repeated attempts by various states, municipalities, and individuals since then to create zoning and housing laws based on race, however, such laws eventually were overturned by the courts. The legality of all discrimination in housing, by public or private entities, was ended by the Fair Housing Act (Title VIII of the Civil Rights Act of 1968). Despite such rulings, there is widespread evidence that zoning laws are still used for the purpose of racial segregation. In the wake of the Fair Housing Act, localities increasingly used purportedly non-racial zoning laws to keep non-whites out of white neighborhoods. Localities prohibited duplexes, small homes, and multi-family buildings, which were more likely to be occupied by racial minorities, recent immigrants, and poor households. The outcome of segregating different areas of cities and regions by uses or characteristics of uses has resulted in increased racial and economic segregation.

=== Health and environmental concerns ===
A study of greenhouse gas emissions found that strict zoning laws "seem to be pushing new development towards places with higher emissions." Public officials have argued that, while zoning laws have historically had a negative impact on the environment through their promotion of low-density sprawl and car-centric development, zoning can be used to preserve open space and as a tool to promote the usage of renewable energy. These forms of development, by fostering car dependency, may also contribute to a rise in sedentary lifestyles and obesity.

== See also ==
- Agricultural zoning
- Missing middle housing
- Mobility transition
- Stroad
- Transfer of development rights
- Urban growth boundary
