= Grandfather clause =

Exemption of existing cases from a new rule

A grandfather clause, also known as grandfather policy, grandfathering, or being grandfathered in, is a provision in which an old rule continues to apply to some existing situations while a new rule will apply to all future cases. Those exempt from the new rule are said to have grandfather rights or acquired rights, or to have been grandfathered in. Frequently, the exemption is limited, as it may extend for a set time, or it may be lost under certain circumstances; for example, a grandfathered power plant might be exempt from new, more restrictive pollution laws, but the exception may be revoked and the new rules would apply if the plant were expanded. Often, such a provision is used as a compromise or out of practicality, to allow new rules to be enacted without upsetting a well-established logistical or political situation. This extends the idea of a rule not being retroactively applied. The grandfather clause has been described as biased against new sources, increasing barriers to entry and reducing investment.

A gender-neutral version of the term would be a legacy clause or legacied.

== Origin and history ==
=== Southern United States ===
The term originated in late 19th-century legislation and constitutional amendments passed by a number of Southern U.S. states, which created new requirements for literacy tests, payment of poll taxes and residency and property restrictions to register to vote. States in some cases exempted those whose ancestors (e.g., grandfathers) had the right to vote before the American Civil War or as of a particular date from such requirements. The intent and effect of such rules was to prevent former African-American slaves and their descendants from voting but without denying poor and illiterate whites the right to vote. Although these original grandfather clauses were eventually ruled unconstitutional, the terms grandfather clause and grandfather have been adapted to other uses.

The original grandfather clauses were contained in new state constitutions and Jim Crow laws passed between 1890 and 1908 by white-dominated state legislatures including Alabama, Georgia, Louisiana, North Carolina, Oklahoma, and Virginia. They restricted voter registration, effectively preventing African Americans from voting. Racial restrictions on voting in place before 1870 were invalidated by the Fifteenth Amendment.

After Democrats took control of state legislatures again, especially after the Compromise of 1877, they began to work to restrict the ability of black people to vote. Terrorist groups such as the White League, Red Shirts, and local "rifle clubs" had intimidated black people or barred them from the polls in numerous elections before what they called the Redemption (restoration of white supremacy). Nonetheless, a coalition of Populists and Republicans in fusion tickets in the 1880s and 1890s gained some seats and won some governor positions. To prevent such coalitions in the future, the Democrats wanted to exclude freedmen and other black people from voting; in some states they also restricted poor whites to avoid biracial coalitions.

White Democrats developed statutes and passed new constitutions creating restrictive voter registration rules. Examples included imposition of poll taxes and residency and literacy tests. An exemption to such requirements was made for all persons allowed to vote before the American Civil War, and any of their descendants. The term grandfather clause arose from the fact that the laws tied the then-current generation's voting rights to those of their grandfathers. According to Black's Law Dictionary, some Southern states adopted constitutional provisions exempting from the literacy requirements descendants of those who fought in the army or navy of the United States or of the Confederate States during a time of war.

After the U.S. Supreme Court found such provisions unconstitutional in Guinn v. United States (1915), states were forced to stop using the grandfather clauses to provide exemption to literacy tests. Without the grandfather clauses, tens of thousands of poor Southern whites were disenfranchised in the early 20th century. As decades passed, Southern states tended to expand the franchise for poor whites, but most black people could not vote until after passage of the 1965 Voting Rights Act. Ratification in 1964 of the Twenty-fourth Amendment to the United States Constitution prohibited the use of poll taxes in federal elections, but some states continued to use them in state elections.

The 1965 Voting Rights Act had provisions to protect voter registration and access to elections, with federal enforcement and supervision where necessary. In 1966, the Supreme Court ruled in Harper v. Virginia Board of Elections that poll taxes could not be used in any elections. This secured the franchise for most citizens, and voter registration and turnout climbed dramatically in Southern states.

=== Other contexts ===
There is also a rather different, older type of grandfather clause, perhaps more properly a grandfather principle in which a government blots out transactions of the recent past, usually those of a predecessor government. The modern analogue may be repudiating public debt, but the original was Henry II's principle, preserved in many of his judgments, "Let it be as it was on the day of my grandfather's death", a principle by which he repudiated all the royal grants that had been made in the previous 19 years under King Stephen.

== See also ==
- Grace period
- Nonconforming use
- Sunset provision
- Williams v. Mississippi
