= Variance (land use) =

A variance is a deviation from the set of rules a municipality applies to land use and land development, typically a zoning ordinance, building code or municipal code. The manner in which variances are employed can differ greatly depending on the municipality. A variance may also be known as a standards variance, referring to the development standards contained in code. A variance is often granted by a Board or Committee of adjustment.

== Description ==
A variance is an administrative exception to land use regulations. The use and application of variances can differ considerably throughout the great number of municipalities worldwide that regulate land use on this model. The issuance of variances may be very common, or nearly unheard-of in a given municipality. This can depend on a municipality's regulations, built environment and development pattern, and even political climate. One city may view variances as a routine matter, while another city may see variances as highly unusual exceptions to the norm. Community attitudes and political climates can change within a city as well, affecting the manner in which variances are granted even when no changes are made to the regulations governing variances.

Typically, in the United States, the process for a variance must be made available to a landowner upon request, or the municipality may be in danger of committing a regulatory taking. The variance process has been described as "a constitutional safety valve" to protect the rights of landowners.

== Types ==
Two broad categories of variances generally are used in the practice of local land use planning: area (or bulk) variances and use variances.

An area variance is the most common type. It can be requested by a builder or landowner when an odd configuration of the land, or sometimes the physical improvements (structures) on the land, requires a relaxation of the applicable regulations to avoid denying the landowner the same rights and use of the property enjoyed by owners of neighboring properties. A textbook example would be a house built on an oddly-shaped lot. If the odd shape of the lot makes it onerous for the landowner or builder to comply with the standard building setbacks specified in the code, a variance could be requested to allow a reduced setback. Another would be a house built on a sloping lot. If the slope of the lot makes it onerous to comply with the height limit—typically due to the way the municipality's code requires height to be measured—then a variance could be requested for a structure of increased height because of the special conditions on the lot.

A use variance is a variance that authorizes a land use not normally permitted by the zoning ordinance. Such a variance has much in common with a special-use permit (sometimes known as a conditional use permit). Some municipalities do not offer this process, opting to handle such situations under special use permits instead. Grant of a use variance also can be similar, in effect, to a zone change. This may, in certain cases, be considered spot zoning, which is prohibited in many jurisdictions.

In either case, the variance request is justified only if special conditions exist on the lot that create a hardship making it too difficult to comply with the code's normal requirements. Likewise, a request for a variance on a normal lot with no special conditions could judiciously be denied. The special conditions or hardship typically must arise from some physical configuration of the lot or its structures. The financial or personal situation of the applicant normally cannot be taken into consideration. Under most codes governing variances, approval of the variance must not result in a public health or safety hazard and must not grant special privilege to the property owner. In other words, when a variance is granted, any other property owner with similar site conditions should be able to obtain a similar variance; this criterion is often addressed by citing precedent.

== See also ==
- Zoning
- Spot zoning
- Zoning in the United States
- Special use permit
- Nonconforming use
