= Zoning =

Government policy allowing certain uses of land in different places

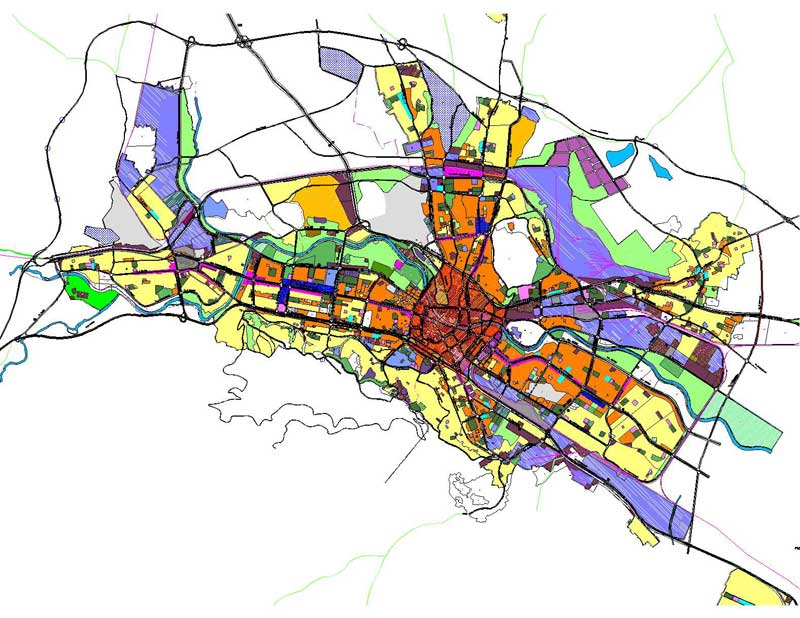
The Zoning Scheme of the General Spatial Plan for the City of Skopje, North Macedonia. Different urban zoning areas are represented by different colours.

In urban planning, zoning is a method in which a municipality or other tier of government divides land into land-use and building "zones", each of which has a set of regulations for new development that differs from other zones. Zones may be defined for a single use (e.g. residential, industrial), they may combine several compatible activities by use, or in the case of form-based zoning, the differing regulations may govern the density, size and shape of allowed buildings whatever their use. The planning rules for each zone determine whether planning permission for a given development may be granted. Zoning may specify a variety of outright and conditional uses of land. It may indicate the size and dimensions of lots that land may be subdivided into, or the form and scale of buildings. These guidelines are set in order to guide urban growth and development.

Zoning is the most common regulatory urban planning method used by local governments in developed countries. Exceptions include the United Kingdom and the city of Houston, Texas. Most zoning systems have a procedure for granting variances (exceptions to the zoning rules), usually because of some perceived hardship caused by the particular nature of the property in question.

== History ==
The origins of zoning districts can be traced back to antiquity. The ancient walled city was the predecessor for classifying and regulating land, based on use. Outside the city walls were the undesirable functions, which were usually based on noise and smell. The space between the walls is where unsanitary and dangerous activities occurred such as butchering, waste disposal, and brick-firing. Within the walls were civic and religious places, and where the majority of people lived.

Beyond distinguishing between urban and non-urban land, most ancient cities further classified land types and uses inside their walls. This was practiced in many regions of the world – for example, in China during the Zhou Dynasty (1046 – 256 BC), in India during the Vedic Era (1500 – 500 BC), and in the military camps that spread throughout the Roman Empire (31 BC – 476 AD).

Throughout the Age of Enlightenment and Industrial Revolution, cultural and socio-economic shifts led to the rapid increase in the enforcement and invention of urban regulations. The shifts were informed by a new scientific rationality, the advent of mass production and complex manufacturing, and the subsequent onset of urbanization. Industry leaving the home reshaped modern cities. The definition of home was tied to the definition of economy, which caused a much greater mixing of uses within the residential quarters of cities.

Separation between uses is a feature of many planned cities designed before the advent of zoning. A notable example is Adelaide in South Australia, whose city centre, along with the suburb of North Adelaide, is surrounded on all sides by a park, the Adelaide Park Lands. The park was designed by Colonel William Light in 1836 in order to physically separate the city centre from its suburbs. Low density residential areas surround the park, providing a pleasant walk between work in the city within and the family homes outside.

Sir Ebenezer Howard, founder of the garden city movement, cited Adelaide as an example of how green open space could be used to prevent cities from expanding beyond their boundaries and coalescing. His design for an ideal city, published in his 1902 book Garden Cities of To-morrow, envisaged separate concentric rings of public buildings, parks, retail space, residential areas and industrial areas, all surrounded by open space and farmland. All retail activity was to be conducted within a single glass-roofed building, an early concept for the modern shopping centre inspired by the Crystal Palace.

However, these planned or ideal cities were static designs embodied in a single masterplan. What was lacking was a regulatory mechanism to allow the city to develop over time, setting guidelines to developers and private citizens over what could be built where. The first modern zoning systems were applied in the United States with the Los Angeles zoning ordinances of 1904 and the New York City 1916 Zoning Resolution.

== Types ==
There are a great variety of zoning types, some of which focus on regulating building form and the relation of buildings to the street with mixed uses, known as form-based, others with separating land uses, known as use-based, or a combination thereof. Use-based zoning systems can comprise single-use zones, mixed-use zones - where a compatible group of uses are allowed to co-exist - or a combination of both single and mixed-use zones in one system.

The main approaches include use-based, form-based, performance and incentive zoning. There are also several additional zoning provisions used in combination with the main approaches.

=== Main approaches to zoning ===
==== Use-based zoning ====
Use-based or functional zoning systems can comprise single-use zones, mixed-use zones—where a compatible group of uses are allowed to co-exist —or a combination of both single- and mixed-use zones in one system.

===== Single-use zoning =====
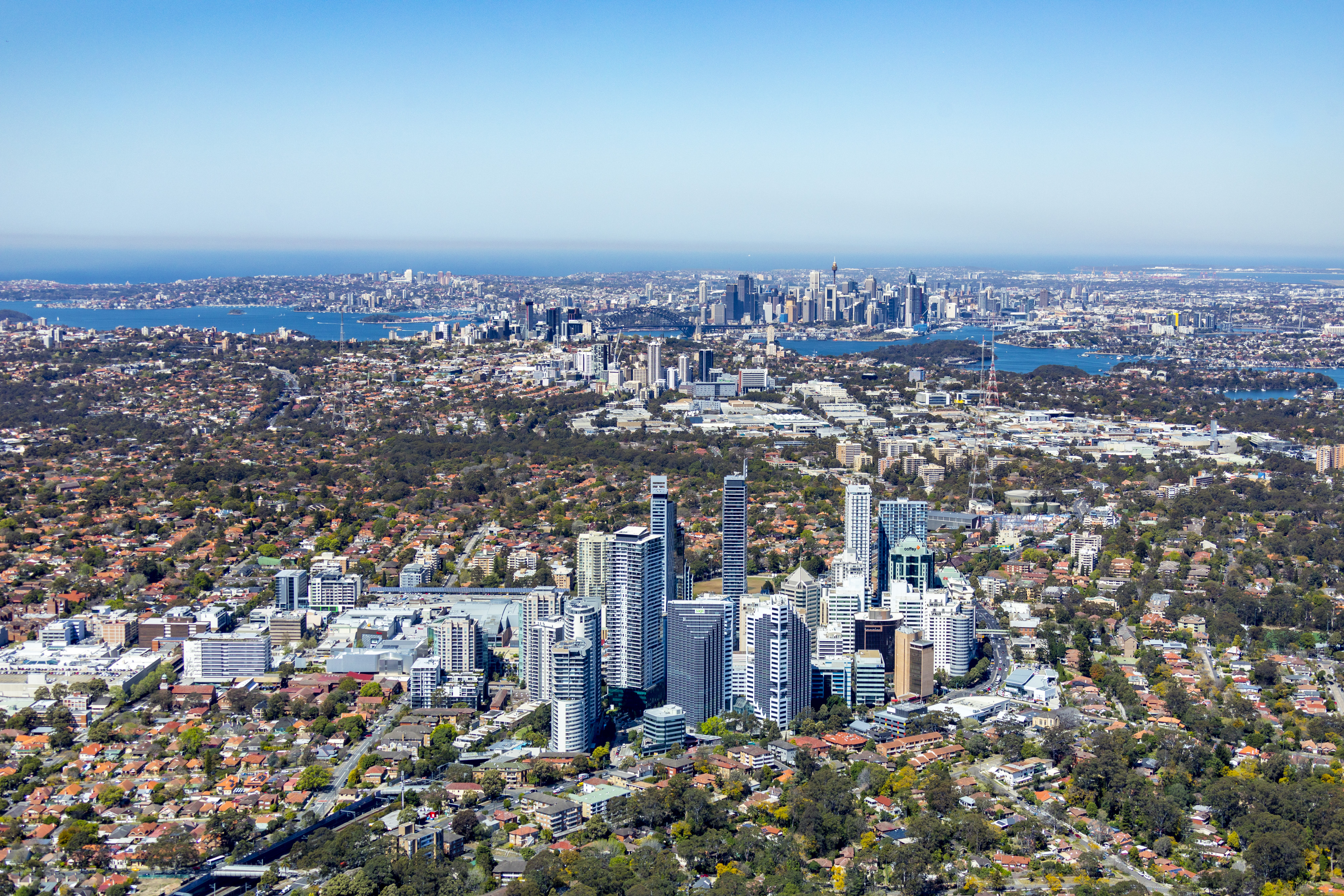
Aerial view of Chatswood, Australia, looking towards Sydney. The boundaries between low density residential, commercial and industrial zones are clearly visible.

The primary purpose of single-use zoning is to geographically separate uses that are thought to be incompatible. In practice, zoning is also used to prevent new development from interfering with existing uses and/or to preserve the character of a community.

Single-use zoning is where only one kind of use is allowed per zone, or district. It is also known as exclusionary zoning or, in the United States, as Euclidean zoning because of a court case in Euclid, Ohio, Village of Euclid, Ohio v. Ambler Realty Co. 272 U.S. 365 (1926), which established its constitutionality. It has been the dominant system of zoning in North America, especially the United States, since its first implementation.

Commonly defined single-use districts include: residential, commercial, and industrial. Each category can have a number of sub-categories, for example, within the commercial category there may be separate districts for small retail, large retail, office use, lodging and others, while industrial may be subdivided into heavy manufacturing, light assembly and warehouse uses. Special districts may also be created for purposes like public facilities, recreational amenities, and green space.

The application of single-use zoning has led to the distinctive form of many cities in the United States, Canada, Australia, and New Zealand, in which a very dense urban core, often containing skyscrapers, is surrounded by low density residential suburbs, characterised by large gardens and leafy streets. Some metropolitan areas such as Minneapolis–Saint Paul and Sydney have several such cores.

===== Mixed-use zoning =====
Mixed-use zoning combines residential, commercial, office, and public uses into a single space. Mixed-use zoning can be vertical, within a single building, or horizontal, involving multiple buildings.

Planning and community activist Jane Jacobs wrote extensively on the connections between the separation of uses and the failure of urban renewal projects in New York City. She advocated dense mixed-use developments and walkable streets. In contrast to villages and towns, in which many residents know one another, and low-density outer suburbs that attract few visitors, cities and inner city areas have the problem of maintaining order between strangers. This order is maintained when, throughout the day and evening, there are sufficient people present with eyes on the street. This can be accomplished in successful urban districts that have a great diversity of uses, creating interest and attracting visitors. Jacobs' writings, along with increasing concerns about urban sprawl, are often credited with inspiring the New Urbanism movement.

To accommodate the New Urbanist vision of walkable communities combining cafés, restaurants, offices and residential development in a single area, mixed-use zones have been created within some zoning systems. These still use the basic regulatory mechanisms of zoning, excluding incompatible uses such as heavy industry or sewage farms, while allowing compatible uses such as residential, commercial and retail activities so that people can live, work and socialise within a compact geographic area.

The mixing of land uses is common throughout the world. Mixed-use zoning has particular relevance in the United States, where it is proposed as a remedy to the problems caused by widespread single-use zoning.

==== Form-based zoning ====
Form-based or intensity zoning regulates not the type of land use, but the form that land use may take. For instance, form-based zoning in a dense area may insist on low setbacks, high density, and pedestrian accessibility. Form-based codes (FBCs) are designed to directly respond to the physical structure of a community in order to create more walkable and adaptable environments.

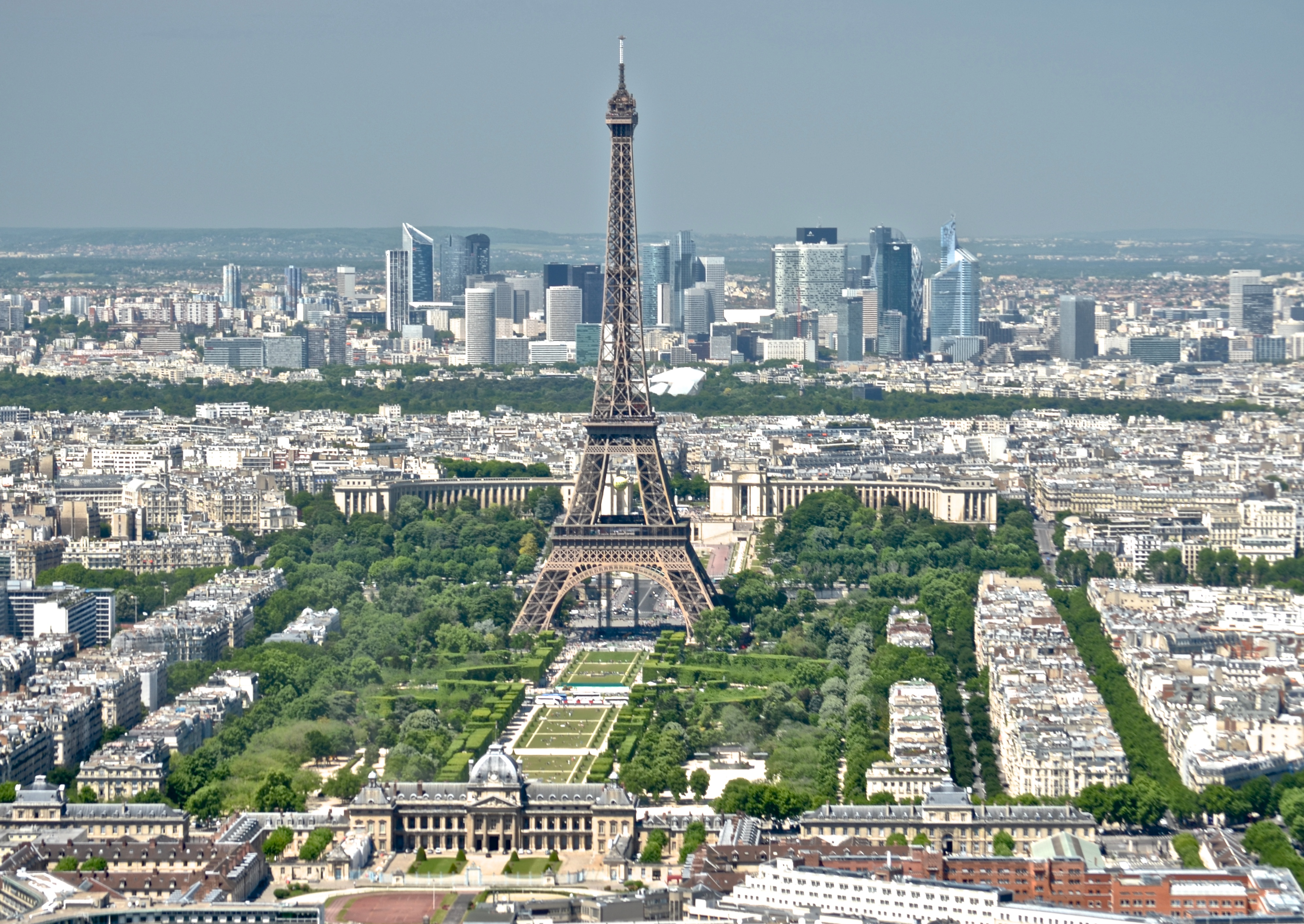
Paris, looking toward the high density district of La Défense

Form-based zoning codes have five main elements: a regulating plan, public standards, building standards, and precise definitions of technical terms. Form-based codes recognize the interrelated nature of all components of land-use planning—zoning, subdivision, and public works—and integrate them to define districts based on the community's desired character and intensity of development.

The French planning system is mostly form-based; zones in French cities generally allow many types of uses. The city of Paris has used its zoning system to concentrate high-density office buildings in the district of La Défense rather than allow heritage buildings across the city to be demolished to make way for them, as is often the case in London or New York. The construction of the Montparnasse Tower in 1973 led to an outcry. As a result, two years after its completion the construction of buildings over seven storeys high in the city centre was banned.

==== Performance zoning ====
Performance zoning, also known as flexible or impact zoning or effects-based planning, was first advocated by Lane Kendig in 1973. It uses performance-based or goal-oriented criteria to establish review parameters for proposed development projects. Performance zoning may use a menu of compliance options where a property developer can earn points or credits for limiting environmental impacts, including affordable housing units, or providing public amenities. In addition to the menu and points system, there may be additional discretionary criteria included in the review process. Performance zoning may be applied only to a specific type of development, such as housing, and may be combined with a system of use-based districts.

Performance zoning is flexible, logical, and transparent while offering a form of accountability. These qualities are in contrast with the seemingly arbitrary nature of use-based zoning. Performance zoning can also fairly balance a region's environmental and housing needs across local jurisdictions. Performance zoning balances principles of markets and private property rights with environmental protection goals. However, performance zoning can be extremely difficult to implement due to the complexity of preparing an impact study for each project, and can require the supervising authority to exercise considerable discretion. Performance zoning has not been adopted widely in the US.

==== Incentive zoning ====
Incentive zoning allows property developers to develop land more intensively, such as with greater density or taller buildings, in exchange for providing some public benefits, such as environmental amenities or affordable housing units. The public benefits most often incentivized by U.S. cities are "mixed-use development, open space conservation, walkability, affordable housing, and public parks."

Incentive zoning allows for a high degree of flexibility, but may be complex to administer. The more a proposed development takes advantage of incentive criteria, the more closely it has to be reviewed on a discretionary basis. The initial creation of the incentive structure in order to best serve planning priorities also may be challenging and often requires extensive ongoing revision to maintain balance between incentive magnitude and value given to developers. Incentive zoning may be most effective in communities with well-established standards and where demand for both land and for specific amenities is high. However, hidden costs may still offset its benefits. Incentive zoning has also been criticized for increasing traffic, reducing natural light, and offering developers larger rewards than those reaped by the public.

=== Additional provisions ===
Additional zoning provisions exist that are not their own distinct types of zoning but seek to improve existing varieties through the incorporation of flexible practices and other elements such as information and communication technologies (ICTs).

==== Smart zoning ====
Smart zoning is a broad term that consists of several alternatives to use-based zoning that incorporate information and communication technologies. There are a number of different techniques to accomplish smart zoning. Floating zones, cluster zoning, and planned unit developments (PUDs) are possible—even as the conventional use-based code exists—or the conventional code may be completely replaced by a smart performance or form-based code, as the city of Miami did in 2019. The incorporation of ICTs to measure metrics such as walkability, and the flexibility and adaptability that smart zoning can provide, have been cited as advantages of smart zoning over "non-smart" performance or form-based codes.

==== Floating zones ====
Floating zones describe a zoning district's characteristics and codify requirements for its establishment, but its location remains unspecified until conditions exist to implement that type of zoning district. When the criteria for implementation of a floating zone are met, the floating zone ceases "to float" and its location is established by a zoning amendment.

==== Cluster zoning ====
Cluster zoning permits residential uses to be clustered more closely together than normally allowed, thereby leaving substantial land area to be devoted to open space. Cluster zoning has been favored for its preservation of open space and reduction in construction and utility costs via consolidation, although existing residents may often disapprove due to a reduction in lot sizes.

==== Planned unit development (PUD) ====
The term planned unit development (PUD) can refer either to the regulatory process or to the development itself. A PUD groups multiple compatible land uses within a single unified development. A PUD can be residential, mixed-use, or a larger master-planned community. Rather than being governed by standard zoning ordinances, the developer negotiates terms with the local government. At best, a PUD provides flexibility to create convenient ways for residents to access commercial and other amenities. In the US, residents of a PUD have an ongoing role in management of the development through a homeowner's association.

==== Pattern zoning ====
Pattern zoning is a zoning technique in which a municipality provides licensed, pre-approved building designs, typically with an expedited permitting process. Pattern zoning is used to reduce barriers to housing development, create more affordable housing, reduce burdens on permit-review staff, and create quality housing designs within a certain neighborhood or jurisdiction. Pattern zoning may also be used to promote certain building types such as missing middle housing and affordable small-scale commercial properties. In some cases, a municipality purchases design patterns and constructs the properties themselves while in other cases the municipality offers the patterns for private development.

==== Hybrid zoning ====
A hybrid zoning code combines two or more approaches, often use-based and form-based zoning. Hybrid zoning can be used to introduce form and design considerations into an existing community's zoning without completely rewriting the zoning ordinance.

Composite zoning is a particular type of hybrid zoning that combines use, form, and site design components:

- the use component establishes how land can be used within a district, as in use-based or functional zoning;
- the form (also known as architectural) component sets standards for building design, such as height and facades;
- the site design component specifies how buildings are situated on the site, such as setbacks and open space.

An advantage of composite zoning is the ability to create flexible zoning districts for smoother transitions between adjacent properties with different uses.

==== Inclusionary zoning ====
Inclusionary zoning refers to policies to increase the number of housing units within a development that are affordable to low and middle-income households. These policies can be mandatory as part of performance zoning or based on voluntary incentives, such as allowing greater density of development.

==== Overlay zoning ====
An overlay zone is a zoning district that overlaps one or more zoning districts to address a particular concern or feature of that area, such as wetlands, historic buildings or transit-oriented development. Overlay zoning has the advantage of providing targeted regulation to address a specific issue, such as a natural hazard, without having to significantly rewrite an existing zoning ordinance. However, development of overlay zoning regulation often requires significant technical expertise.

==== Transferable development rights ====
Transferable development rights, also known as transfer of development credits and transferable development units, are based on the concept that with land ownership comes the right of use of land, or land development. These land-based development rights can, in some jurisdictions, be used, unused, sold, or otherwise transferred by the owner of a parcel. These are typically used to transfer development rights from rural areas (sending sites) to urban areas (receiving sites) with more demand and infrastructure to support development.

==== Spot zoning ====
Spot zoning is a controversial practice in which a small part of a larger zoning district is rezoned in a way that is not consistent with the community's broader planning process. While a jurisdiction can rezone even a single parcel of land in some cases, spot zoning is often disallowed when the change would conflict with the policies and objectives of existing land-use plans. Other factors that may be considered in these cases are the size of the parcel, the zoning categories involved, how adjacent properties are zoned and used, and expected benefits and harms to the landowner, neighbors, and community.

==== Conditional zoning ====
Conditional zoning is a legislative process in which site-specific standards and conditions become part of the zoning ordinance at the request of the property owner. The conditions may be more or less restrictive than the standard zoning. Conditional zoning can be considered spot zoning and can be challenged on those grounds.

Conditional zoning should not be confused with conditional-use permits (also called special-use permits), a quasi-judicial process that enables land uses that, because of their special nature, may be suitable only in certain locations, or when arranged or operated in a particular manner. Uses which might be disallowed under current zoning, such as a school or a community center, can be permitted via conditional-use permits.

==== Contract zoning ====
Contract zoning is a controversial practice in which there is a bilateral agreement between a property owner and a local government to rezone a property in exchange for a commitment from the developer. It typically involves loosening restrictions on how the property can be used. Contract zoning is controversial and sometimes prohibited because it deviates from the broader planning process and has been considered an illegal bargaining away of the government's police powers to enforce zoning.

==== Fiscal zoning ====
Fiscal zoning is a controversial practice in which local governments use land use regulation, including zoning, to encourage land uses that generate high tax revenue and exclude uses that place a high demand on public services.

== Effectiveness and criticism ==
Environmental activists argue that putting everyday uses out of walking distance of each other leads to an increase in traffic, since people have to own cars in order to live a normal life where their basic human needs are met, and get in their cars and drive to meet their needs throughout the day. Single-use zoning and urban sprawl have also been criticized as making work–family balance more difficult to achieve, as greater distances need to be covered in order to integrate the different life domains. These issues are especially acute in the United States, with its high level of car usage combined with insufficient or poorly maintained urban rail and metro systems.

Some economists claim that zoning laws work against economic efficiency, reduce responsiveness to consumer demands and hinder development in a free economy, as poor zoning restrictions hinder the more efficient usage of a given area. Even without zoning restrictions, a landfill, for example, would likely gravitate to cheaper land and not a residential area. Single-use zoning laws can get in the way of creative developments like mixed-use buildings and can even stop harmless activities like yard sales. The Houston example of non-zoning or private zoning with no restriction on particular land use but with other development code shows a combination of private and public planning.

Other critics of zoning argue that zoning laws are a disincentive to provide housing which results in an increase in housing costs and a decrease in productive economic output. For example, a 2017 study showed that if all states deregulated their zoning laws only halfway to the level of Texas, a state known for low zoning regulations, their GDP would increase by 12 percent due to more productive workers and opportunity. Furthermore, critics note that it impedes the ability of those that wish to provide charitable housing from doing so. For example, in 2022, Gloversville's Free Methodist Church in New York wished to provide 40 beds for the homeless population in −4 °F (−20 °C) weather and were inhibited from doing so.

Corruption is a challenge for zoning. Some have argued that zoning laws increase economic inequality. Empirical effectiveness estimates show some zoning approaches can contribute to housing crisis.

== Alternatives ==
In Houston, Texas, the lack of a local zoning ordinance means that property owners make heavy use of deed restrictions to prevent unwanted development. This practice is sometimes known as "private zoning". Non-zoned land regulations can still include requirements like minimum lot size and setbacks.

== By country ==
=== Australia ===
The legal framework for land use zoning in Australia is established by States and Territories, hence each State or Territory has different zoning rules. Land use zones are generally defined at local government level, and most often called Planning Schemes. Typically, state governments have an absolute ability to overrule the local decision-making. There are administrative appeal processes such as VCAT to challenge decisions.

State / Territory	Planning framework	Land use regulation
ACT	Territory Plan 2008	Land Use Policy
NSW	Environmental Planning and Assessment Act 1979	Local Environmental Plans (LEP)
NT	Planning Act	Planning Scheme
QLD	Sustainable Planning Act 2009 repealed. Planning Act 2016	Planning Schemes
SA	Planning, Development and Infrastructure Act 2016	Planning and Design Code
TAS	Land Use Planning and Approvals Act 1993	Planning Schemes
VIC	Planning and Environment Act 1987	Planning Schemes
WA	Planning and Development Act 2005	Planning Schemes

Statutory planning, otherwise known as urban planning, development control or development management, refers to the part of the planning process that is concerned with the regulation and management of changes to land use and development.

=== Canada ===
In Canada, land-use control is a provincial responsibility deriving from the constitutional authority over property and civil rights. This authority had been granted to the provinces under the British North America Acts of 1867 and was carried forward in the Constitution Act, 1982. The zoning power relates to real property, or land and the improvements constructed thereon that become part of the land itself (in Québec, immeubles). The provinces empowered the municipalities and regions to control the use of land within their boundaries, letting the municipalities establish their own zoning by-laws. There are provisions for control of land use in unorganized areas of the provinces. Provincial tribunals are the ultimate authority for appeals and reviews.

=== France ===
In France, the Code of Urbanism (French: Code de l’urbanisme, also called the Town Planning Code), a national law, guides regional and local planning and outlines procedures for obtaining building permits. Unlike England where planners must use their discretion to allow use or building type changes, private development in France is permitted as long as the developer follows the legally-binding regulations.

=== Japan ===
Zoning districts are classified into twelve use zones. Each zone determines a building's shape and permitted uses. A building's shape is controlled by zonal restrictions on allowable floor area ratio and height (in absolute terms and in relation with adjacent buildings and roads). These controls are intended to allow adequate light and ventilation between buildings and on roads. Instead of single-use zoning, zones are defined by the "most intense" use permitted. Uses of lesser intensity are permitted in zones where higher intensity uses are permitted but higher intensity uses are not allowed in lower intensity zones.

color	zone	detail
	Category I low-rise residential (第一種低層住居専用地域)	Low-rise residential buildings which are also used as small shops or offices; elementary/junior high schools
	Category II low-rise residential (第二種低層住居専用地域)	Low-rise residential buildings, including small shops or offices; elementary/junior high schools with a floor area of up to 150 sq.m.
	Category I mid/high-rise residential (第一種中高層住居専用地域)	Medium to high residential buildings, including hospitals and universities; some types of shops with a floor area of up to 500 sq.m.
	Category II mid/high-rise residential (第二種中高層住居専用地域)	Medium to high residential buildings, including hospitals and universities; some types of shop with a floor area of up to 1,500 sq.m.
	Category I residential (第一種住居地域)	Residential environments including shops, offices, and hotels with a floor area of up to 3,000 sq.m.
	Category II residential (第二種住居地域)	Residential environments including shops, offices, and hotels, as well as buildings with a karaoke box
	Quasi-residential (準住居地域)	Residential environments in harmony with vehicle-related facilities along roads
	Rural residential (田園住居地域)	Low-rise housing up to 500 sq.m. related to agricultural promotion
	Neighborhood commercial (近隣商業地域)	Daily shopping facilities for neighbourhood residents, including small factory buildings.
	Commercial (商業地域)	Banks, cinemas, restaurants, and department stores, including residential and small factory buildings
	Quasi-industrial (準工業地域)	Light industrial and service facilities; all types of factories except those which are considered to considerably worsen the environment
	Industrial (工業地域)	All types of factories including residential and shops; schools, hospitals, and hotels not permitted
	Exclusively industrial (工業専用地域)	All types of factories; residential, shop, school, hospital, and hotel not permitted

=== New Zealand ===
New Zealand's planning system is grounded in effects-based Performance Zoning under the Resource Management Act.

=== Philippines ===
Zoning and land use planning in the Philippines is governed by the Department of Human Settlements and Urban Development (DHSUD) and previously by the Housing and Land Use Regulatory Board (HLURB), which lays out national zoning guidelines and regulations, and oversees the preparation and implementation of comprehensive land use plans (CLUPs) and zoning ordinances by city and municipal governments under their mandate in the Local Government Code of 1991 (Republic Act No. 7160).

The present zoning scheme used in the Philippines is detailed in the HLURB's Model Zoning Ordinance published in 2014, which outlines 26 basic zone types based on primary usage and building regulations (as defined in the National Building Code), and also includes public domain and water bodies within the municipality's jurisdiction. Local governments may also add overlays identifying special use zones such as areas prone to natural disasters, ancestral lands of indigenous peoples (IPs), heritage zones, ecotourism areas, transit-oriented developments (TODs), and scenic corridors. Residential and commercial zones are further subdivided into subclasses defined by density, commercial zones also allow for residential uses, and industrial zones are subdivided by their intensity and the environmental impact of the uses allowed. Regulations on residential, commercial, and industrial zones may differ between municipalities, so one municipality may permit 4-storey buildings on medium-density residential zones, while another may only permit 2-storey buildings.

Type	Description
Forest	Forested areas, subdivided into protection forests and productions forests. Protection forests includes forest reserves, national parks and protected areas, military reserves and civil reserves, and forested urban buffer zones. Production forest includes forestry lands, special use zones, and grazing lands.
Agriculture	Land intended for agricultural activities, including land cultivation, tree growing, livestock, poultry, fisheries and aquaculture. Subdivided into protection agriculture (agriculture protection zones as designated by the Department of Agriculture) and production agriculture
Agro-industrial	Intended for integrated farms and processing of harvested crops.
Municipal waters	All water bodies under the jurisdiction of the municipality, as defined in the Fisheries Code (Republic Act 8550), excluding areas designated as protected areas by the national government. Subdivided into fishery refuge and sanctuary, foreshore land, mangrove, delta/estuary, lakes, aquaculture zones, commercial fishing zones, municipal fishing zones, and sea lanes.
Mineral land	Lands intended for mining. Subdivided into mineral reservations, small-scale mining zones and quarries.
General residential	Intended principally for housing.
Residential-1 (R-1)	Intended for low-rise, low-density, single-family housing, such as single-detached homes, duplex houses, and subdivisions. Also permitted are home occupations and businesses, sari-sari stores, home-based cottage industries, local recreational facilities, nurseries and daycares, elementary schools, tutors, places of worship, barangay halls, and local health centers. Buildings can be up to three stories and a height of 10 meters (33 ft).
Residential-2 (R-2)	Intended for low-rise, medium-density, multi-family dwellings. Buildings can be up to five stories and a height of 15 meters (49 ft). All uses in R-1 zones, apartments, boarding houses, dormitories, high schools, technical schools, museums, and libraries permitted. Subdivided into basic R-2 and maximum R-2, with the former having a limit of three stories and 10 meters (33 ft).
Residential-3 (R-3)	Intended for low- to medium-rise, medium- to high-density, multi-family dwellings. Buildings can be up to twelve stories and a height of 36 meters (118 ft) All uses in R-1 and R-2 zones, residential condominiums, and commercial accommodation (hotels, pension houses, hotel apartments, except motels), and parking buildings permitted. Subdivided into basic R-3 and maximum R-3, with the former having a height limit of three stories and 10 meters (33 ft).
Residential-4 (R-4)	Intended for townhouses. Buildings can be up to three stories and a height of 10 meters (33 ft) All uses in R-1 and R-2 zones permitted.
Residential-5 (R-5)	Intended for medium- to high-rise, high-density, and multi-family dwellings such as high-rise residential condominiums. Buildings can be up to 18 stories and a height of 54 meters (177 ft). All uses in R-1 through R-4 zones permitted.
Socialised housing	Intended for areas designated for socialized housing projects undertaken by the Philippine government or the private sector to house underprivileged citizens and the homeless. Allowed uses defined in Batas Pambansa No. 220.
General commercial	Intended for businesses, trade and services.
Commercial-1 (C-1)	Intended for low-density, neighborhood-scale businesses. All uses in R-1 zones also permitted. Buildings can be up to 3 stories and a height of 10 meters (33 ft).
Commercial-2 (C-2)	Intended for medium- to high-density business activity complementing or supplementing the city or municipality's central business district (CBD). All uses in R-1, R-2, and C-1 zones allowed, with the addition of wholesale stores, public markets, malls, supermarkets, call centers, broadcasting and film studios, car dealerships, automotive-related services, scrap dealers, hardware stores, construction-related businesses, garden stores, signmakers, welders, furniture makers, commercial condominiums, lechon stores, chicharon factories, and motels. Buildings can be up to 6 stories and a height of 18 meters (59 ft).
Commercial-3 (C-3)	High-density commercial area forming a city or municipality's CBD. All uses in R-3, R-4, R-5, C-1 and C-2 zones allowed, with the addition of regional shopping malls. Buildings can be up to 60 stories and a height of 180 meters (590 ft).
Industrial-1 (I-1)	Intended for light manufacturing or production activities that are non-polluting. Some allowed uses are dried fish production, biscuit factories, boat, pump boat/motor banca and small watercraft manufacturing, printing presses, most electronics factories, medical equipment manufacturing, wooden furniture manufacturing, garments factories, water pumping station, sewage or wastewater treatment plants, and warehouses for non-polluting and non-hazardous products. Areas can have parks or playgrounds. Buildings can be up to a height of 15 meters (49 ft).
Industrial-2 (I-2)	Intended for medium-intensity manufacturing or production activities that are polluting. Some permitted uses are canning plants, rice or corn mills, animal feed mills medicine and pharmaceutical manufacturers, metal and plastic furniture manufacturers, glass factories garments and textile factories, rice mills, flour mills, cigar and cigarette factories, vehicle manufacturers, shipyards, hangars, warehouses for polluting and hazardous products, paint stores, and large slaughterhouses. Areas can have parks or playgrounds. Buildings can be up to a height of 21 meters (69 ft).
Industrial-3 (I-3)	Intended for high-intensity manufacturing or production activities that are usually highly polluting and extremely hazardous. Some permitted uses include meat processing plants (except those for ham, bacon, sausages and chicharon) soft drink factories, sugar mills, paper mills, cement factories, chemical plants, steel plants, textile factories, canned fish factories, bagoong and patis factories, oil depots, terminals and refineries, warehouses for highly polluting and hazardous products, and power plants. Areas can have parks or playgrounds. Buildings can be up to a height of 27 meters (89 ft).
General institutional	Intended primarily for government or civic centers, police and fire stations, government buildings, higher education institutions (college, universities, vocational, technical or trade schools), learning facilities (libraries, training centres), scientific, cultural and academic centres, convention centres, hospitals and medical centers, places of worship, seminaries or convents, and embassies/consulates. Buildings can be up to a height of 15 meters (49 ft).
Special institutional	Intended primarily for social welfare institutions (orphanages, Boys/Girls Town, homes for the aged), rehabilitation centers, military installations, prisons and other correctional institutions, leprosaria, and mental health asylums. Buildings can be up to a height of 15 meters (49 ft).
Parks and recreation	Intended for parks and recreational facilities like playgrounds, resort complexes, sports facilities, memorials/shrines and open spaces serving as buffer zones or easements. Buildings can be up to a height of 15 meters (49 ft).
Cemetery/memorial park	Area intended for cemeteries or memorial parks, including columbaria, crematoria, and ossuaries. Buildings can be up to a height of 15 meters (49 ft), and site subject to DHUSD regulations.
Buffer/greenbelt	Yard, parks or open spaces intended to serve as a buffer zone or greenbelt between conflicting land use zones. Allowed uses are parks and related structures, plant nurseries, agriculture, silviculture and horticulture. No permanent structures are permitted, and any buildings can be only up to a height of 6 meters (20 ft).
Utilities, transportation and services	Area designated for use by functional buildings and structures used for utilities, transportation, and other public services. Permitted uses include bus terminals and train stations, ports, airports, power plants, landfills and waste management facilities, weather and climate management stations, telecommunications facilities, and large complexes for other public services. Buildings can be up to a height of 15 meters (49 ft).
Tourism	Areas dedicated for tourism activity. Allowed uses include agritourism, resort areas, theme parks, heritage/historical sites, tourist accommodation, souvenir shops, and outdoor sports grounds.

=== Singapore ===
The framework for governing land uses in Singapore is administered by the Urban Redevelopment Authority (URA) through the Master Plan. The Master Plan is a statutory document divided into two sections: the plans and the Written Statement. The plans show the land use zoning allowed across Singapore, while the Written Statement provides a written explanation of the zones available and their allowed uses.

=== South Africa ===
There are five (5) zoning categories in South Africa; residential, business, industrial, agricultural, and open space zoning. These five categories are further classified into subcategories. The zoning categories are governed by the Spatial Planning and Land Use Management Act enacted in 2016. To change a land use from one zone to another requires a process of rezoning.

=== United Kingdom ===
The United Kingdom does not use zoning as a technique for controlling land use. British land use control began its modern phase after the Town and Country Planning Act of 1947. Rather than dividing municipal maps into land use zones, English planning law places all development under the control of local and regional governments, effectively abolishing the ability to develop land by-right. However, existing development allows land use by-right as long as the use does not constitute a change in the type of land use. A property owner must apply to change land use type of any existing building, and such changes must be consistent with the local and regional land use plans.

Development control or planning control is the element of the United Kingdom's system of town and country planning through which local government regulates land use and new building. There are 421 Local Planning Authorities (LPAs) in the United Kingdom. Generally they are the local borough or district council or a unitary authority. They each use a discretionary "plan-led system" whereby development plans are formed and the public consulted. Subsequent development requires planning permission, which will be granted or refused with reference to the development plan as a material consideration.

The plan does not provide specific guidance on what type of buildings will be allowed in a given location, rather it provides general principles for development and goals for the management of urban change. Because planning committees (made up of directly elected local councillors) or in some cases planning officers themselves (via delegated decisions) have discretion on each application for development or change of use made, the system is considered a 'discretionary' one.

Planning applications can differ greatly in scale, from airports and new towns to minor modifications to individual houses. In order to prevent local authorities from being overwhelmed by high volumes of small-scale applications from individual householders, a separate system of permitted development has been introduced. Permitted development rules are largely form-based, but in the absence of zoning, are applied at the national level. Examples include allowing a two-storey extension up to three metres at the rear of a property, extensions up to 50% of the original width at each side, and certain types of outbuildings in the garden, provided that no more than 50% of the land area is built over. These are appropriately sized for a typical three bedroom semi-detached property, but must be applied across a wide variety of housing types, from small terraces, to larger detached properties and manor houses.

In August 2020, the UK Government published a consultation document called "Planning for the Future". The proposals hinted at a move toward zoning in England, with areas given a Growth, Renewal or Protected designation, with the possibility of "sub-areas within each category", although the document did not elaborate on what the details of these might have been. Nothing was done with these proposals and following the 2024 general election there are no plans for the UK to adopt zoning within its planning system.

=== United States ===
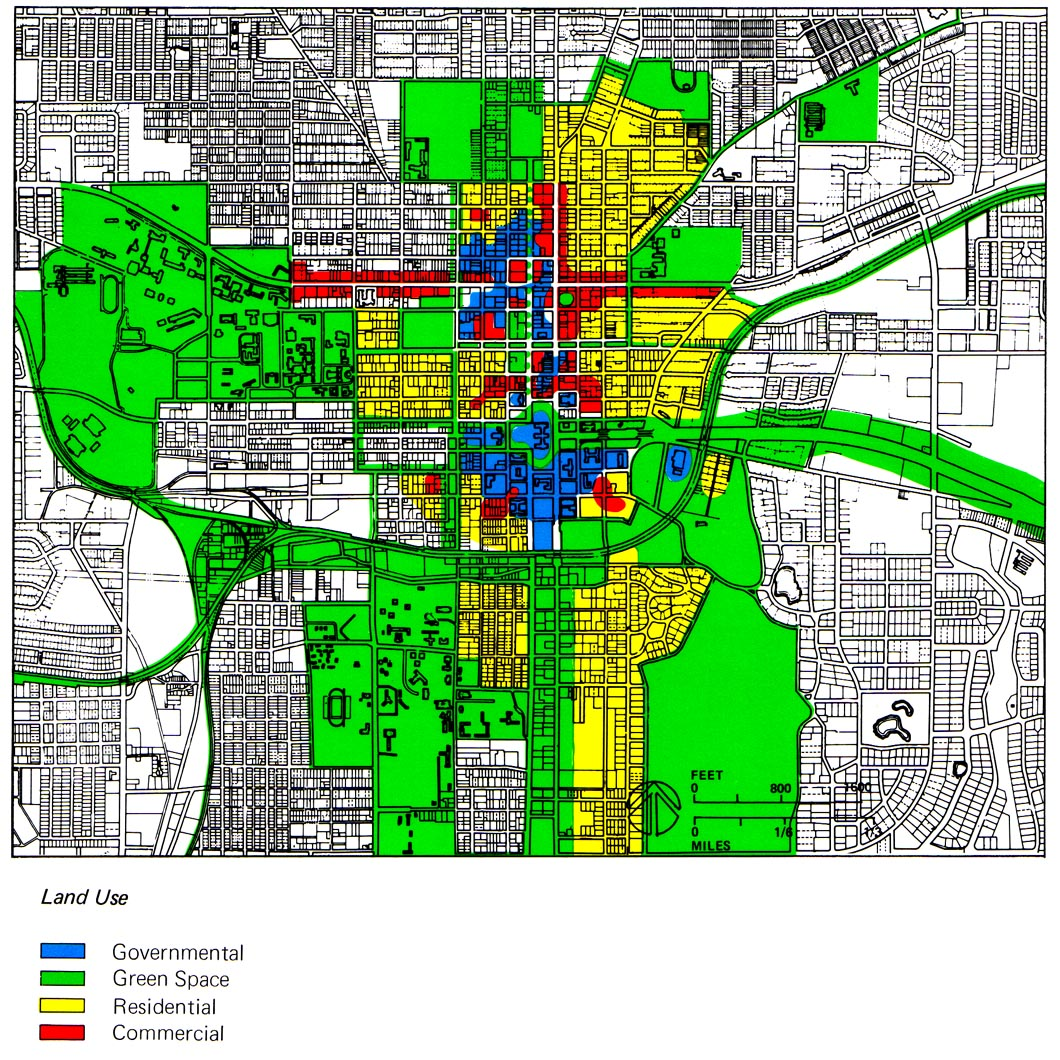
Zoning scheme of the center of Tallahassee, Florida, United States

Under the police power rights, state governments may exercise over private real property. With this power, special laws and regulations have long been made restricting the places where particular types of business can be carried on. In 1904, Los Angeles established the nation's first land-use restrictions for a portion of the city. New York City adopted the first zoning regulations to apply city-wide in 1916.

The constitutionality of zoning ordinances was upheld by the U.S. Supreme Court in the 1926 case Village of Euclid, Ohio v. Ambler Realty Co. Among large populated cities in the United States, Houston is unique in having no zoning ordinances. The city instead has a proliferation of private deed restrictions and retains government regulations like minimum lot size and setbacks.

==== Scale ====
Early zoning practices were subtle and often debated. Some claim the practices started in the 1920s while others suggest the birth of zoning occurred in New York in 1916. Both of these examples for the start of zoning, however, were urban cases. Zoning becomes an increasing legal force as it continues to expand in its geographical range through its introduction in other urban centres and use in larger political and geographical boundaries. Regional zoning was the next step in increased geographical size of areas under zoning laws. A major difference between urban zoning and regional zoning was that "regional areas consequently seldom bear direct relationship to arbitrary political boundaries". This form of zoning also included rural areas which was counter-intuitive to the theory that zoning was a result of population density. Finally, zoning also expanded again but back to a political boundary again with state zoning.

==== Types in use in the United States ====
Use-based zoning, especially single-use zoning, is by far the most common type of zoning in the U.S., where it is known as Euclidean zoning, after Euclid, Ohio's role in a landmark U.S. Supreme Court case, Village of Euclid v. Ambler Realty Co.

==== Single-use zoning in the United States ====
Single-use zoning takes two forms, flat and hierarchical, also known as cumulative or pyramidal. Under flat zoning, each district is strictly designated for one use. In a simple hierarchical zoning system, districts are organized with residential (the most sensitive and least disruptive category) at the top, followed by commercial and industrial. Residential and commercial buildings are allowed in industrial zones and residential buildings are allowed in commercial zones. More complex hierarchical systems account for multiple levels within categories, such as multiple types of residential buildings in multifamily residential districts. Hierarchical zoning generally fell out of favor in the United States in the mid-twentieth century, with flat zoning becoming more popular, although many municipalities still incorporate some degree of hierarchy in their zoning ordinances.

Single-use zoning is used by many municipalities due to its ease of implementation (one set of explicit, prescriptive rules), long-established legal precedent, and familiarity to planners and design professionals. Single-use zoning has been criticized, however, for its lack of flexibility. Separation of uses can contribute to urban sprawl, loss of open space, heavy infrastructure costs, and automobile dependency. In particular, single-family zoning, residential districts where only single-family homes can be built, has been widely criticized as a cause of sprawl and racial segregation.

==== Social problems in the United States ====
The United States suffers from greater levels of deurbanization and urban decay than other developed countries, and additional problems such as urban prairies that do not occur elsewhere. Jonathan Rothwell has argued that zoning encourages racial segregation. He claims a strong relationship exists between an area's allowance of building housing at higher density and racial integration between blacks and whites in the United States. Racial zoning saw its foray in Berkeley, California by land developer Duncan McDuffie throughout the early 1900s to prevent Chinese and Blacks from entering White neighborhoods. The relationship between segregation and density is explained by Rothwell and Massey as the restrictive density zoning producing higher housing prices in white areas and limiting opportunities for people with modest incomes to leave segregated areas. Between 1980 and 2000, racial integration occurred faster in areas that did not have strict density regulations than those that did. Rothwell and Massey suggest homeowners and business interests are the two key players in density regulations that emerge from a political economy. They propose that in older states where rural jurisdictions are primarily composed of homeowners, it is the narrow interests of homeowners to block development because tax rates are lower in rural areas, and taxation is more likely to fall on the median homeowner. Business interests are unable to counteract the homeowners' interests in rural areas because business interests are weaker and business ownership is rarely controlled by people living outside the community. This translates into rural communities that have a tendency to resist development by using density regulations to make business opportunities less attractive. Density zoning regulations in the U.S increase residential segregation in metropolitan areas by reducing the availability of affordable housing in some jurisdictions; other zoning regulations like school infrastructure regulations and growth controls are also variables associated with higher segregation. With more permissive zoning regulations there are lower levels of segregation; desegregation is higher in places with more liberal regulations on zoning, allowing the residents to integrate racially. Metropolitan areas that allowed higher density development moved rapidly toward racial integration than their counterparts with strict density limitations. The greater the allowable density, the lower the level of racial segregation.

Zoning laws that limit the construction of new housing (like single-family zoning) are associated with reduced affordability and are a major factor in residential segregation in the United States by income and race.

The first formal zoning ordinance in the United States was aimed at racial segregation. In 1885, the city of Modesto, California passed a law restricting the establishment of laundries into the city's Chinatown, a move aimed at stopping the encroachment of Chinese immigrants into previously white areas of the city.

== See also ==
- Activity centre
- Agricultural protection zoning
- Context theory
- Ekistics
- Exclusionary zoning
- Fenceline community
- Form-based codes
- Gentle density
- Greenspace (disambiguation)
  - Open space reserve
  - Urban open space
- Inclusionary zoning
- Land-use conflict
- Locally unwanted land use
- Mixed use development
- New urbanism
- NIMBY
- Non-conforming use
- Planning permission
- Police power
- Principles of Intelligent Urbanism
- Reverse sensitivity
- Road
- Single-use zoning
- Spot zoning
- Statutory planning
- Subdivision (land)
- Traffic
- Variance (land use)
- YIMBY
- Zoning district
- Zoning in the United States
