= Standard State Zoning Enabling Act =

"A Standard State Zoning Enabling Act" (SZEA) was a model law for U.S. states to enable zoning regulations in their jurisdictions. It was drafted by a committee of the Department of Commerce and first issued in 1922. This act was one of the foundational developments in land use planning in the United States.

== Background ==
The zoning advisory committee that wrote the standard act was formed in the U.S. Department of Commerce in September 1921. The Secretary of Commerce was Herbert Hoover, who was later elected US President.

== Summary ==
The SZEA begins with several explanatory notes. The act itself is nine sections with annotations mostly describing the committee's choice of words.

The SZEA was first issued in August 1922, was reissued in revised form in January 1923, and was first printed in May 1924. More than 55,000 copies of the first printed edition were sold. A second printed edition was published in 1926.

== Legacy ==
The 1926 revised second printing noted that 19 states had passed enabling acts modeled on the Standard State Zoning Enabling Act.

The American Planning Association wrote that the SZEA and the Standard City Planning Enabling Act of 1927 "laid the basic foundation for land development controls in the U.S."
