= Pennsylvania Coal Co. v. Mahon =

Pennsylvania Coal Company v. Mahon
- Supreme Court of the United States

Argued November 14, 1922 Decided December 11, 1922
- Full case name: Pennsylvania Coal Co. v. Mahon
- Citations: 260 U.S. 393 (more) 43 S. Ct. 158; 67 L. Ed. 322; 1922 U.S. LEXIS 2381

Case history
- Prior: Mahon v. Pa. Coal Co., 274 Pa. 489, 118 A. 491 (1922)

Holding
- Whether a regulatory act constitutes a taking requiring compensation depends on the extent of diminution in the value of the property.

Court membership
- Chief Justice William H. Taft Associate Justices Joseph McKenna · Oliver W. Holmes Jr. Willis Van Devanter · Mahlon Pitney; James C. McReynolds · Louis Brandeis; George Sutherland

Case opinions
- Majority: Holmes, joined by Taft, McKenna, Day, Van Devanter, Pitney, McReynolds, Sutherland
- Dissent: Brandeis

Laws applied
- U.S. Const. amends. V, XIV

Pennsylvania Coal Co. v. Mahon, 260 U.S. 393 (1922), was a case in which the Supreme Court of the United States held that whether a regulatory act constitutes a taking requiring compensation depends on the extent of diminution in the value of the property.

The decision thereby started the doctrine of regulatory taking. The Takings Clause originally applied only when the government physically seized or occupied property. Prior to 1922, American courts followed a clear rule: regulation of land was not a taking. Rather, it was simply an exercise of the government’s police power to protect the public health, safety, welfare, and morals.

Pennsylvania Coal also established the diminution-of-value test, in contrast to other tests, such as the permanent physical occupations test of Loretto v. Teleprompter Manhattan CATV Corp. (1982), the nuisance-control measures test of Hadacheck v. Sebastian (1915), and the total takings test of Lucas v. South Carolina Coastal Council (1992). Additionally, the case was one of the first to address the denominator problem with regard to regulatory taking.

== Parties ==
Plaintiff/Respondent: H.J. Mahon, owner of surface rights to a parcel of land.

Defendant/Petitioner: Pennsylvania Coal Co., owner of two sorts of mining rights to a parcel of land: the mineral rights and the "support estate," which concern pillars of coal that prop up the surface after/during coal mining..

== Background ==
=== State of law ===
In the late 19th century, the modern regulatory state was developing and the "scope of police regulation" was broadened. Whereas police regulations that restricted private property uses were originally thought to be used mostly to avoid noxious uses, police powers were expanding. Consequently, takings without compensation increased and the flaws of the previous takings doctrine, that exercises of police power could never be takings, became more apparent along with the need for changes in the takings law.

At the time this case was decided, Mugler v. Kansas, "was the leading case standing for the proposition that an exercise of the police power could never be a taking ... even if they deprive property holders of all economic use of their property."

=== Facts of case ===
In an 1878 deed, the Pennsylvania Coal Co. granted to H. J. Mahon the surface rights to a parcel of land, but retained the mining rights to the land, and Mahon accepted any risk from, and waived all claim for damages resulting from, mining below the property. In 1921, the Commonwealth of Pennsylvania passed the Kohler Act, which prohibited the mining of anthracite coal in such way as to cause the subsidence of, among other things, any structure used as a human habitation. Prior Pennsylvania law had recognized that such pillars of coal necessary to support the land surface were an estate in land (a "support estate"), separate from the rights in removable coal. Pennsylvania Coal provided notice to Mahon that it planned to mine for coal under Mahon's habitation, and Mahon brought suit to prevent Pennsylvania Coal from mining under his land pursuant to the Kohler Act.

=== Prior history ===
Mahon sued in the Court of Common Pleas to enjoin Pennsylvania Coal from conducting mining, but the court denied the injunction, holding the application of the Kohler Act to this case would be unconstitutional. The Supreme Court of Pennsylvania reversed, holding that the statute was a, "legitimate exercise of the police power" and granted an injunction. PA Coal v. Mahon, 43 Sup Ct. 412.

== Legal analysis ==
=== Issues and Holdings ===
Issue: Whether the Kohler Act discloses a public interest sufficient to warrant the (admitted) destruction of the Pennsylvania Coal Co.'s property and contract rights? (As applied.)

-Holding #1: No. This was an invalid exercise of the police power and constituted a (14th Amendment) taking of Pennsylvania Coal's property and contract rights.

Issue #2: Whether the Kohler Act, in general, was a valid exercise of the police power. (Facial challenge.)

-Holding #2: No. The Kohler Act "goes too far" by restricting the right to mine anthracite coal to so great an extent as to violate the 14th Amendment Due Process clause's protection of property and contract rights by effectively nullifying those rights. (The property rights being the "support estate" and thus the right to mine the pillars of coal which support the surface; the contract rights being those found in the deed of purchase of the surface rights from the coal company, which concern the surface owners'/purchaser's waiver of liability for any damage caused by subsidence.)

=== Rule of law ===
The Court ruled that whether a regulatory act constitutes a taking requiring compensation depends on the extent of diminution in the value of the property.

=== Reasoning ===
The Court argued as follows: (1) The damage done by the activity prohibited by the act is a private, not a public nuisance; there is no public safety justification for the statute, as notice before mining would suffice to protect public safety. On the other hand, the damage done by the statute is significant, insofar as it abolishes an estate in land and a binding contract. (2) The statute, in general, purports to extinguish the mining rights to valuable properties under surfaces owned by the public and the government. The statute makes prohibitively expensive the mining of coal in these areas, and thereby effectively destroys the right; after all, owning coal is not worth anything if the coal cannot be mined. The rights of the public to its streets and other property are rights paid for. If the representatives of the public have been so shortsighted as not to pay for the mining rights of the land as well, there is no authority to grant those rights without compensation. (If the land above required compensation, so therefore does the land below.)

The Court also advanced its policy concern of governmental overreach when it stated, "We are in danger of forgetting that a strong public desire to improve the public condition is not enough to warrant achieving the desire by a shorter cut than the constitutional way of paying for the change." Id. at 416.

=== Dissenting Opinion: Brandeis, J. ===
Justice Brandeis, "chiefly argued for what is now called the nuisance exception: if a land use is itself noxious, dangerous, or causes a public nuisance, the legislature is free to regulate its use without compensation, even though the police power may cause great loss to the property owner."

Brandeis explained nearly every restriction upon the use of property entails a deprival of some right of the owner, but this can be justified by the police power because restrictions, "imposed to protect the public health, safety or morals from dangers threatened is not a taking." In this case, the police power applies insofar as the Kohler Act prohibits a noxious use, the noxious use here being the subsidence of buildings. Justice Brandeis also addresses the public/private aspect of the Kohler Act stating that, "the purpose of a restriction does not cease to be public, because incidentally some private persons may thereby receive gratuitously valuable special benefits...Furthermore, a restriction, though imposed for a public purpose, will not be lawful, unless the restriction is an appropriate means to the public end. But to keep coal in place is surely an appropriate means of preventing subsidence of the surface; and ordinarily it is the only available means."

== Result ==
=== Judgment/disposition ===
Supreme Court of Pennsylvania judgment reversed.

=== Subsequent Case History ===
Today, the Supreme Court quotes Justice Holmes in Mahon for the recognition of the invalidity of a government regulation that so severely burdens private property that it constitutes a taking under the Fifth Amendment, even though it was technically a Fourteenth Amendment "takings" case. The cited cases include: Goldblatt v. Hempstead, 369 U.S. 590, 594 (1962); Penn Central Transportation Co. v. New York City, 438 U.S. 104, 127 (1978); Agins v. City of Tiburon, 447 U.S. 255 (1980); San Diego Gas & Electric Co. v. City of San Diego, 450 U.S. 621 (1981); Loretto v. Teleprompter Manhattan CATV Corp., 458 U.S. 419 (1982); Keystone Bituminous Coal Association v. DeBenedictis, 480 U.S. 470 (1987); First English Evangelical Lutheran Church v. County of Los Angeles, 482 U.S. 304 (1987); and Lucas v. South Carolina Coastal Council, 505 U.S. 1003, 1014 (1992).

=== Subsequent research ===
Economist William A. Fischel has explained the disparity between what was actually happening in the Scranton area during the time of Mahon and how the area was portrayed in the litigation. Subsidence did not happen often, the vast majority of coal companies worked hard to prevent subsidence, and when it did the companies generally paid to fix any damage. Most of the subsidence issues were cracks in foundation and the settling of parts of houses. Yet a brief submitted for the city of Scranton "painted a picture of disaster, which has been accepted as the likely outcome of the decision in the legal literature." When Fischel investigated subsidence issues in anthracite coal mining in Pennsylvania, he was "struck by how little was written about the subsidence problem, which was in stark contrast to the picture painted for the Court in the briefs of the City of Scranton. In their study of the anthracite saga, The Kingdom of Coal (1985), the historians Donald Miller and Richard Sharpless did not mention subsidence in the 360 pages" of their book. In a subsequent conversation, Sharpless told Fischel that subsidence was not mentioned was "because it was not much of an issue". When Fischel visited the Anthracite Heritage Museum near Scranton, he asked the librarian to help him locate works on subsidence and, "all that was available were technical pamphlets and a few relatively recent (post 1950) newspaper clippings that illustrated some damage." Fischel's research revealed that surface damage "seems to have been episodic and limited; cities were not literally falling into the earth. Nor did any of the newspaper stories raise the question of legal liability for surface support."

=== Justice Holmes ===
Benjamin Barros noted that Justice Holmes, throughout his career as a state and federal judge, "held a consistent view ... that restrictions imposed through the police power could reach a point where they become takings and violate the Just Compensation Clause." states that because of the distinct departure the holding in this case took from Mugler v. Kansas, the prior leading case in takings jurisprudence, it was "somewhat surprising that Holmes ignored Mugler entirely in his Mahon opinion." However, in a letter written shortly after Mahon was decided, Holmes regretted his lack of elaboration on the basis of his decision, and suggested that his disagreement with Mugler was influential in shaping his holding in Mahon. In fact, in a letter dated January 13, 1923, Justice Holmes stated "I always have thought that old Harlan's decision in Mugler v. Kansas was pretty fishy."

== See also ==
- List of United States Supreme Court cases, volume 260

== Selected articles ==
- Evan B. Brandes, "Legal Theory and Property Jurisprudence of Oliver Wendell Holmes, Jr. and Louis D. Brandeis: An Analysis of Pennsylvania Coal Company v. Mahon," 38 Creighton Law Review 1179 (2005)
