= Palazzolo v. Rhode Island =

- Supreme Court of the United States

Argued February 26, 2001 Decided June 28, 2001
- Full case name: Anthony Palazzolo v. Rhode Island, et al.
- Citations: 533 U.S. 606 (more) 121 S. Ct. 2448; 150 L. Ed. 2d 592; 2001 U.S. LEXIS 4910; 69 U.S.L.W. 4605; 52 ERC (BNA) 1609; 2001 Cal. Daily Op. Service 5439; 2001 Daily Journal DAR 6685; 32 ELR 20516; 2001 Colo. J. C.A.R. 3358; 14 Fla. L. Weekly Fed. S 458

Case history
- Prior: On certiorari to the Rhode Island Supreme Court.
- Subsequent: Remanded to Rhode Island Supreme Court.

Holding
- A claimant does not waive his right to challenge a regulation as an uncompensated taking by purchasing property after the enactment of the regulation challenged.

Court membership
- Chief Justice William Rehnquist Associate Justices John P. Stevens · Sandra Day O'Connor; Antonin Scalia · Anthony Kennedy; David Souter · Clarence Thomas; Ruth Bader Ginsburg · Stephen Breyer

Case opinions
- Majority: Kennedy, joined by Rehnquist, O'Connor, Scalia, Thomas; Stevens (Part II–A)
- Concurrence: O'Connor
- Concurrence: Scalia
- Concur/dissent: Stevens
- Dissent: Ginsburg, joined by Souter, Breyer
- Dissent: Breyer

Laws applied
- U.S. Const. amends. V, XIV

Palazzolo v. Rhode Island, 533 U.S. 606 (2001), is a United States Supreme Court case in which the Court held that a claimant does not waive his right to challenge a regulation as an uncompensated regulatory taking by purchasing property after the enactment of the regulation challenged.

== Background ==
=== Parties ===
Plaintiff/Petitioner
Anthony Palazzolo, owner of a waterfront parcel of land in the town of Westerly, Rhode Island, almost all of which is designated coastal wetlands under Rhode Island law.
Defendant/Respondent
Rhode Island Coastal Resources Management Council.

=== State of law ===
Prior to 1971, owners of coastal land required a permit from the Rhode Island Division of Harbors and Rivers (DHR) in order to erect structures on coastal lands. In 1971, Rhode Island enacted legislation creating the Coastal Resources Management Council, charged with protecting the state's coastal properties. Regulations promulgated by the council protected coastal salt marshes as "coastal wetlands,'" on which construction was severely limited.

=== Facts of case ===
In 1959, Petitioner Palazzolo and business associates, operating under the name Shore Gardens, Inc. (SGI) purchased three undeveloped parcels on the Rhode Island coast. Petitioner Palazzolo eventually became sole shareholder of SGI, and began efforts to develop the land by submitting parcelling plans to the town. As the land required significant filling, Petitioner Palazzolo submitted applications for permits from the Division of Harbors and Rivers, which were denied. In 1978, SGI was dissolved and Palazzolo acquired all of SGI's properties in his individual capacity. In 1983, Petitioner Palazzolo again attempted to develop the land, submitting several permits, all of which were rejected. He also challenged the Council's determinations as contrary to the principles of state administrative law, but the courts affirmed the Council's actions.

=== Prior history ===
Petitioner Palazzolo sued in Rhode Island courts for inverse condemnation. Eventually, the Rhode Island Supreme Court rejected his claims.

=== Procedural posture ===
After the Rhode Island Supreme Court rejected his claims, Palazzolo, represented by Pacific Legal Foundation, sought review from the United States Supreme Court, which granted certiorari. Rhode Island was represented by U.S. Senator Sheldon Whitehouse, who was the state attorney general at the time.

== Legal analysis ==
=== Issue ===
The Court addressed whether the Rhode Island Supreme Court erred in holding that Petitioner did not have standing to claim a regulatory taking because he acquired the property after the enactment of regulations, and that Petitioner did not endure a total taking because some of the parcel remains economically usable.

=== Arguments/theories ===
Petitioner
Petitioner Palazzolo argued that the denial of a permit for filling by the Respondent Council effects a taking without compensation under the total takings analysis of Lucas v. South Carolina Coastal Council because the denial deprives him of "all economically beneficial use" of the land.
Rhode Island Supreme court
The Rhode Island Supreme Court held that (1) Petitioner Palazzolo had no right to challenge the permit denial as a total taking because he acquired the property after the enactment of the regulation under which the permit was denied, and therefore had sufficient notice of such regulation; (2) the upland portions of the land were available for development, and therefore Palazzolo was not deprived of all economically beneficial use (as required under Lucas); and (3) Palazzolo cannot claim a taking under the more general balancing test of Penn Central Transportation Co. v. New York City.

=== Rule of law ===
The Court ruled that a claimant does not waive his right to challenge a regulation as an uncompensated taking by purchasing property after the enactment of the regulation challenged.

=== Holding ===
The Court held that the Rhode Island Supreme Court erred in holding that Petitioner did not have standing to sue because he acquired the property after the enactment of regulations.

However, the Court also held that Palazzolo could not assert a takings claim based on the denial of all economic use of his property in light of undisputed evidence that the upland portion of the property was economically viable.

Finally, the Court did not address the issue of whether reasonable "investment backed expectations" were affected by a regulation that pre-dated Palazzolo's ownership of the land, which were not addressed earlier. Therefore, the Court remanded the case back to the Rhode Island Supreme Court to re-examine under the Penn Central analysis.

=== Reasoning ===
The majority argued, regarding the first holding, as follows: The argument that a claimant who acquires property after the enactment of a regulation waives the right to challenge such regulation as an unconstitutional regulatory taking fails because (1) such a principle would make the constitutionality of a regulation a matter of the passage of time, thereby creating a "[statute of limitations]" on a constitutional right; (2) such a principle also prejudices owners at the time of regulation, whose ability to transfer the land has become seriously impaired; and (3) such a principle would create different and unequal rights between different classes of owners (old owners and new owners).

== Result ==
=== Judgment/disposition ===
Rhode Island Supreme Court judgment reversed in part and remanded.

=== Subsequent history ===
Case thrown out at a lower court.
