= Regulatory taking =

In United States constitutional law, a regulatory taking refers to a situation in which governmental regulations restrict the use of private property to an extent that the landowner is substantially deprived of the reasonable use or value of their property. This principle is grounded in the Fifth Amendment to the United States Constitution, which stipulates that governments are obligated to provide just compensation for such takings. This amendment is applicable to state governments through the Due Process Clause of the Fourteenth Amendment, thereby ensuring that property rights are protected at both federal and state levels.

== Supreme Court jurisprudence ==
=== Pennsylvania Coal Co. v. Mahon ===
In 1922, the Supreme Court held in Pennsylvania Coal Co. v. Mahon that governmental regulations that went "too far" were a taking. Justice Oliver Wendell Holmes, writing for the majority of the court, stated that "[t]he general rule at least is that while property may be regulated to a certain extent, if regulation goes too far it will be recognized as a taking." Before the court, was a Pennsylvanian law that forbade all mining under inhabited land. The Court held this law to be a taking of the coal owned by the Pennsylvania Coal Company.

The early mining operations often removed so much of the underground coal that the mines became a hazard to the miners underground and to those residing on the surface. For this reason, the Pennsylvania legislature acted to limit the amount of material that could be removed from the mines below in order to leave sufficient underground support below. Pennsylvania Coal Co. v. Mahon involved an action by an individual landowner who sought to prevent a mining operation from violating this law, undermining his or her home. Under Pennsylvania law, the deed also conveyed the right to surface support to the coal company which could thus remove subsurface coal even if that caused subsidence. The coal companies argued in Pennsylvania Coal that they had acquired a right to mine the coal and the right to allow the surface to collapse because these rights had been purchased from the original landowners. The owner's deed conveyed the surface but in express terms reserved the right to remove all the coal. The state and the surface landowners argued that the right to cause surface collapse was not property. The deed provided that the grantee takes the premises with that risk and waives all claim for damages that may arise from mining out the coal. The coal company essentially owned a property right to mine as much as it wished. Over a dissent by Justice Brandeis, the court ruled that Pennsylvania's statute deprived the coal companies of the right to mine their coal.

The Holmes opinion is considered one of the most important opinions in the history of takings law.

While it is often asserted that the doctrine of regulatory takings originated with the Supreme Court’s decision in Pennsylvania Coal Co. v. Mahon (1922), it is argued that the roots of this doctrine extend far earlier, tracing back to developments in American jurisprudence after the Civil War. Early cases, such as Pumpelly v. Green Bay Co. (1872), opened the door to a broader interpretation of takings, allowing for challenges to regulations that interfered with property use. However, the U.S. Supreme Court initially maintained a more restrictive approach, focusing primarily on physical takings. In contrast, various state courts advanced the doctrine by invalidating regulations that affected property rights, even in the absence of physical invasion or title issues. Influential jurists of the period, including Justice David Brewer and Justice Oliver Wendell Holmes Jr., began to articulate foundational theories regarding regulatory takings. They posited that governmental regulations could amount to takings if they significantly impaired the economic viability or practical use of private property, reinforcing the notion that property rights extend beyond mere physical control. Consequently, the Pennsylvania Coal Co. v. Mahon decision did not emerge in isolation; rather, it served to crystallize and formalize a line of legal reasoning and precedents that had been gestating within the broader contours of 19th-century American legal thought.

=== Bituminous Coal Ass'n v. DeBenedictis ===
In Bituminous Coal Ass'n v. DeBenedictis (1987), the Supreme Court revisited the issue of mining restrictions. In this case, the Pennsylvania legislature enacted the Bituminous Mine Subsidence and Land Conservation Act, which required coal companies to leave at least 50 percent of the coal in place beneath certain structures to prevent subsidence. The Court, in contrast to Mahon, took a more favorable view of the legislation, finding that it did not constitute a taking under the Fifth Amendment. The Court emphasized that the regulation was designed to serve a legitimate public interest by protecting the surface from damage caused by mining and did not deprive the coal companies of all economically viable use of their land.

The Court wrote:

[T]he character of the governmental action involved here leans heavily against finding a taking; the Commonwealth of Pennsylvania has acted to arrest what it perceives to be a significant threat to the common welfare. [t]here is no record in this case to support a finding, similar to the one the Court made in Pennsylvania Coal, that the Subsidence Act makes it impossible for petitioners to profitably engage in their business. Under our system of government, one of the State's primary ways of preserving the public weal is restricting the uses individuals can make of their property. While each of us is burdened somewhat by such restrictions, we, in turn, benefit greatly from the restrictions that are placed on others. These restrictions are "properly treated as part of the burden of common citizenship".

=== Penn Central Transportation Co. v. New York City ===
To determine the presence or occurrence of regulatory taking, modern jurisprudence predominantly employs the ad hoc, factor-based test articulated by the Supreme Court of the United States in the landmark case of Penn Central Transportation Co. v. New York City (1978). In this framework, courts are instructed to assess three primary factors:

1. the economic impact of the regulation on the claimant,
2. the extent to which the regulation has interfered with distinct investment-backed expectations and
3. the character of the governmental action.

This test is frequently characterized to be "disorganized" due to its ambiguity surrounding the evaluation of regulation and property rights.

These factors have been criticized because the court failed to provide guidance as to exactly what they mean, what must be proven to establish a taking using them as a test, and whether all three, two, or any one of them is sufficient to show a taking.

In regulatory takings jurisprudence, invoking the Penn Central balancing test almost invariably favors the government. This three-factor test, which considers the economic impact of the regulation, the interference with reasonable investment-backed expectations, and the character of the government action, has been criticized for its indeterminacy and lack of predictable outcomes. In practice, courts applying Penn Central Transportation Co. v. New York City (1978), have overwhelmingly ruled in favor of the government, making it a highly deferential standard.

Legal scholars have noted that Penn Central has become a black hole for property rights claims, in which the balancing of factors rarely results in a finding for the property owner. According to Professor John Echeverria, "...the Penn Central test...is so vague and indeterminate that it invites unprincipled, subjective decision making by the courts." Similarly, Professor Daniel R. Mandelker observes that, "...a takings claim is almost impossible to win" when litigated under this framework.

The U.S. Supreme Court held that: the owners could not establish a "taking" merely by showing that they had been denied the right to exploit the superadjacent airspace, irrespective of the remainder of the parcel; the fact that the law affected some owners more severely than others did not itself result in a "taking," and that the law did not interfere with owners' present use or prevent it from realizing a reasonable rate of return on its investment, especially since preexisting air rights were transferable to other parcels in the vicinity, which acted as a form of compensation for the claimed taking of air rights.

==== Penn Central economic impact factor ====
Under the Penn Central test for regulatory takings, courts consider the economic impact of a government regulation on the property owner. However, courts have been inconsistent in determining the degree to which a regulation's economic impact constitutes a compensable taking under the Penn Central framework.

Some courts do not require any specific percentage of economic loss to satisfy this factor and declined to establish a fixed numerical threshold. Other courts treat percentage loss as a significant, and sometimes decisive, consideration, but disagree on what percentage is sufficient. In Colony Cove Properties, the court held that a 92.5% diminution in value was not enough to constitute a taking. By comparison, courts in other cases have found smaller losses sufficient, such as an 87% loss in Formanek v. United States. Courts also diverge on whether economic impact should be measured by lost property value or lost profits. In Bordelon v. Baldwin County, a taking was found where the property owner was deprived of $600,000 in rental income, representing approximately 18% of the property's value. By contrast, in CCA Associates v. United States, a similar $700,000 loss in net income, also representing 18% of the property's value, was held insufficient to support a taking. As a result, scholars and courts alike have noted the absence of a clear standard. Professor Richard A. Epstein observed that "[n]o one knows how much diminution in value is required." Similarly, Robert Meltz has commented that "the Supreme Court has never given us definite numbers" or "a specified percentage" or any "threshold".

==== Investment-backed expectations factor ====
The investment-backed expectations factor has largely been unclear. In Connolly v. Pension Benefit Guarantee Corp., the Supreme Court stated that "those who do business in the regulated field cannot object if the legislative scheme is buttressed by subsequent amendments to achieve the legislative end." However, in Lucas v. South Carolina Coastal Council, Justice Scalia's opinion for the majority of the court suggested that the expectations were on "how the owner's reasonable expectations have been shaped by the State's law of property." But, in Palazzolo v. Rhode Island, the Court rejected the State's argument that a state can "shape and define property rights and reasonable investment-backed expectations," and held that "State's rule would work a critical alteration to the nature of property... [and a] state may not by this means secure a windfall for itself."

==== Character of the governmental action ====
The character of the governmental action can immediately determine whether the regulation is a taking. For instance, a taking has occurred when a government regulation creates a permanent physical occupation of a landowner's property. This rule comes from Loretto v. Teleprompter Manhattan CATV Corp. which found that a New York law that required property owners to have cable television wires on their property was a taking which required just compensation.

== Constitutional history ==
=== Legal tender cases ===
An early case involving interpretation of the Fifth Amendment was the Legal Tender Cases, 79 U.S. 457 (1870) During the American Civil War, the Legal Tender Acts of 1862 and 1863 made paper money a legal substitute for gold and silver, including for the payment of preexisting debts. In Hepburn v. Griswold, the Supreme Court had found the legal tender laws inconsistent with the spirit of the Constitution, which prohibited the states from passing "any ... law impairing the obligation of contracts." Moreover, the Court had held that an act compelling holders of contracts that called for payment in gold or silver to accept as legal tender "mere promises to pay dollars" was unconstitutional because it deprived "such persons of property without due process of law" under the Fifth Amendment. The Court until this time had rarely found an act of Congress unconstitutional. In 1871, the Court, with two new justices on the bench, reversed itself in the legal tender cases, Knox v. Lee and Parker v. Davis, and declared the Legal Tender Acts constitutional. The Fifth Amendment does not apply to injuries which flow from the exercise of lawful power, the court held, but only to direct appropriation of property.

The fifth amendment. ... forbids taking private property for public use without just compensation or due process of law. That provision has always been understood as referring only to a direct appropriation, and not to consequential injuries resulting from the exercise of lawful power. It has never been supposed to have any bearing upon, or to inhibit laws that indirectly work harm and loss to individuals. A new tariff, an embargo, a draft, or a war may inevitably bring upon individuals great losses; may, indeed, render valuable property almost valueless. They may destroy the worth of contracts. But whoever supposed that, because of this, a tariff could not be charged, or a non-intercourse act, or an embargo be enacted, or a war be declared?

=== Application of the 14th Amendment to the States ===
The Fourteenth Amendment to the United States Constitution extended the protection against uncompensated takings to citizens against their own states. Section 1 of the Fourteenth Amendment states:

All persons born or naturalized in the United States and subject to the jurisdiction thereof, are citizens of the United States and of the State wherein they reside. No State shall make or enforce any law which shall abridge the privileges or immunities of citizens of the United States; nor shall any State deprive any person of life, liberty, or property, without due process of law; nor deny to any person within its jurisdiction the equal protection of the laws.

Prior to the adoption of the 14th Amendment, the Supreme Court held that the Bill of Rights did not apply to the states. Barron v. Baltimore, 32 U.S. 243 (1833). But in the aftermath of the Civil War, the United States adopted the 14th Amendment, which guaranteed equal protection, the privileges or immunities of citizens, and due process of law to all while the 14th Amendment did not explicitly state that the states could not infringe upon the rights of people guaranteed in the Bill of Rights, the Supreme Court began incorporating those rights, finding they applied to the states through the 14th Amendment. The first instance of a right in the bill of rights to be incorporated into the 14th Amendment and applied to a state was for a taking of property in Chicago, Burlington & Quincy Railroad Co. v. City of Chicago, 166 U.S. 226, 233-34 (1897).

The due process clause of the fourteenth amendment has historically been a major vehicle for the increased federal judicial review of the constitutionality of state activity. We find early justices of the Supreme Court puzzling over this, for example, in Mugler v. Kansas, 123 U.S. 623 (1887):

It is not a little remarkable that, while this provision has been in the constitution of the United States as a restraint upon the authority of the federal government for nearly a century, and while during all that time the manner in which the powers of that government have been exercised has been watched with jealousy, and subjected to the most rigid criticism in all its branches, this special limitation upon its powers has rarely been invoked in the judicial forum or the more enlarged theater of public discussion. But while it has been a part of the constitution as a restraint upon the powers of the states only a very few years, the docket of this court is crowded with cases in which we are asked to hold that state courts and state legislatures have deprived their own citizens of life, liberty, and property without due process of law. There is here abundant evidence that there exists some strange misconception of the scope of the provision as found in the fourteenth amendment. In fact, it would seem from the character of many of the cases before us, and the arguments made in them, that the clause under consideration is looked upon as a means of bringing to the test of the decision of this court the abstract opinions of every unsuccessful litigant in a state court of justice of the decision against him, and of the merits of the legislation on which such a decision may be founded.

=== Health and safety takings ===
Suppose the government must cut a firebreak through a forest upon private property to prevent spread of a forest fire. Or suppose the government destroys healthy livestock in a quarantine area to prevent spread of disease. These are invasive takings, but they do not fall under the per se rule described in a previous section. From the very first, the takings cases recognized that `all property in this country is held under the implied obligation that the owner's use of it shall not be injurious to the community.' Mugler v. Kansas, 123 U.S. 623, 665 (1887). The most straightforward example of this principle occurs when the government must condemn or destroy property to prevent spread of disease or other threat to the public health or safety:

Thus, in order to protect the health and safety of the community, government may condemn unsafe structures, may close unlawful business operations, may destroy infected trees, and surely may restrict access to hazardous areas – for example, land on which radioactive materials have been discharged, land in the path of a lava flow from an erupting volcano, or land in the path of a potentially life-threatening flood. When a governmental entity imposes these types of health and safety regulations, it may not be 'burdened with the condition that [it] must compensate such individual owners for pecuniary losses they may sustain, by reason of their not being permitted, by a noxious use of their property, to inflict injury upon the community.

The mere invocation of health and safety concerns to justify a regulation does not automatically shield it from takings liability. As Justice Scalia explained in Lucas v. South Carolina Coastal Council, "Since such a [harm-prevention] justification can be formulated in practically every case, this amounts to a test of whether the legislature has a stupid staff. We think the Takings Clause requires courts to do more than insist upon artful harm-preventing characterizations."

=== Andrus v. Allard ===
In Andrus v. Allard, 444 U.S. 51 (1979), the Court found that the federal Eagle Protection Act could prohibit the sale of lawfully purchased eagle parts. The Court noted that the Act did not confiscate the owner's property, but rather regulated the terms of sale:

The regulations challenged here do not compel the surrender of the artifacts, and there is no physical invasion or restraint upon them. Rather, a significant restriction has been imposed on one means of disposing of the artifacts. But the denial of one traditional property right does not always amount to a taking. At least where an owner possesses a full "bundle" of property rights, the destruction of one "strand" of the bundle is not a taking, because the aggregate must be viewed in its entirety. [citations omitted]. In this case, it is crucial that appellees retain the rights to possess and transport their property, and to donate or devise the protected birds.

The fact that the statute barred the most profitable use of the property was not sufficient, the Court held:

It is, to be sure, undeniable that the regulations here prevent the most profitable use of appellees' property. Again, however, that is not dispositive. When we review regulation, a reduction in the value of property is not necessarily equated with a taking. Compare Goldblatt v. Hempstead, supra, at 594, and Hadacheck v. Sebastian, 239 U.S. 394 (1915), with Pennsylvania Coal Co. v. Mahon, supra. In the instant case, it is not clear that appellees will be unable to derive economic benefit from the artifacts; for example, they might exhibit the artifacts for an admissions charge. At any rate, loss of future profits – unaccompanied by any physical property restriction – provides a slender reed upon which to rest a takings claim. Prediction of profitability is essentially a matter of reasoned speculation that courts are not especially competent to perform. Further, perhaps because of its very uncertainty, the interest in anticipated gains has traditionally been viewed as less compelling than other property-related interests. Cf., e. g., Fuller & Perdue, The Reliance Interest in Contract Damages (pt. 1), 46 Yale L. J. 52 (1936).

=== Agins v. Tiburon ===
The Supreme Court in Agins v. Tiburon, 447 U.S. 255 (1980), stated that the application of land-use regulations to a specific property constitutes a taking when it deprives the owner of reasonable, viable use of the land, or "if the ordinance does not substantially advance legitimate state interests ... or denies an owner economically viable use of his land." In this case, landowners purchased five acres (20,000 m²) of unimproved land within a city, intending to develop it for residential use. Under California law, the city was required to create a general plan for land use and the management of open-space areas. In compliance, the city adopted zoning ordinances that placed the landowners' property in a zone designated for one-family residences, accessory buildings, and open-space uses. The zoning allowed the construction of between one and five single-family homes on the property. The city expressed an intention to acquire the parcel for open-space preservation and initiated condemnation proceedings to take title. These proceedings were later abandoned, and the city instead enacted the zoning ordinance at issue. Without applying for development approval under the new regulations, the landowners filed suit in state court, alleging that the city had taken their property without just compensation, in violation of the Fifth and Fourteenth Amendments. The California Supreme Court held that monetary compensation was not available in regulatory taking cases and declined to recognize such takings. This interpretation was later overturned by the U.S. Supreme Court in First English Evangelical Lutheran Church v. County of Los Angeles, 482 U.S. 304 (1987), which held that compensation is required when government regulation effectively takes property, even if the taking is temporary.

The U.S. Supreme Court held:

The application of a general zoning law to particular property effects a taking if the ordinance does not substantially advance legitimate state interests, see Nectow v. Cambridge, 277 U.S. 183, 188 (1928), or denies an owner economically viable use of his land, see Penn Central Transp. Co. v. New York City, 438 U.S. 104, 138, n. 36 (1978). The determination that governmental action constitutes a taking is, in essence, a determination that the public at large, rather than a single owner, must bear the burden of an exercise of state power in the public interest. Although no precise rule determines when property has been taken, see Kaiser Aetna v. United States, 444 U.S. 164 (1979), the question necessarily requires a weighing of private and public interests. In this case, the law confers a reciprocal benefit: it benefits all landowners, serving the city's interest in assuring careful and orderly development of residential property with provision for open-space areas.

The "substantially advance" requirement from Agins was later overruled in Lingle v. Chevron, where the Court clarified that its earlier reasoning in Agins was incorrect. It explained that the "substantially advance" standard is relevant to substantive due process cases, not to regulatory takings claims.

=== Loretto v. Teleprompter Manhattan CATV Corp. ===
In Loretto v. Teleprompter Manhattan CATV Corp., 458 U.S. 419 (1982), the Supreme Court ruled that a regulation is generally considered a per se taking when it forces landowners to endure a permanent physical occupation on their land, such as the permanent physical presence of cable lines on a residential building. The Court held that any permanent physical presence destroyed the property owner's right to exclude, long recognized as one of the key rights in the "bundle of rights" commonly characterized as property. The Court considered a New York statute which required landlords to install CATV cable facilities on the roof of their buildings; the facilities were part of a citywide cable network designed to bring cable services to the entire city. The landlords were required to provide a location for 6 feet (1.8 m) of cable one-half inch in diameter and two 4 in × 4 in × 4 in (100 mm × 100 mm × 100 mm) metal boxes at a one-time charge determined by the Cable Commission at $1 (equivalent to $3 in 2025). The City argued that the Court should apply a balancing test—that the invasion of property was minimal in comparison to the community wide benefit. But the Court's decision suggested that there was a per se rule requiring compensation in cases of this kind. In short, when the "character of the governmental action, is a permanent physical occupation of property, our cases uniformly have found a taking to the extent of the occupation, without regard to whether the action achieves an important public benefit or has only minimal economic impact on the owner."

The dissent in Loretto pointed out that there are circumstances wherein the government may require installation of devices without compensation: "...the States traditionally – and constitutionally – have exercised their police power "to require landlords to ... provide utility connections, mailboxes, smoke detectors, fire extinguishers, and the like in the common area of a building." These provisions merely ensure tenants access to services the legislature deems important, such as water, electricity, natural light, telephones, inter-communication systems, and mail service. The majority opinion distinguished such requirements because they "do not require the landlord to suffer the physical occupation of a portion of his building by a third party."

=== United States v. Riverside Bayview Homes, Inc. ===
In 1985, the Supreme Court applied its regulatory takings analysis to the Clean Water Act, which prohibits any discharge of dredged or fill materials into "navigable waters"—defined as the "waters of the United States"—unless authorized by a permit issued by the United States Army Corps of Engineers ("Corps"). United States v. Riverside Bayview Homes, Inc., 474 U.S. 121. The Corps issued regulations construing the Act to cover all "freshwater wetlands" that are adjacent to other covered waters. These regulations defined the adjacent wetlands as "those areas that are inundated or saturated by surface or ground water at a frequency and duration sufficient to support, and that under normal circumstances do support, a prevalence of vegetation typically adapted for life in saturated soil conditions." Riverside Bayview Homes, Inc., began placing fill materials on its property near the shores of Lake St. Clair, Michigan. A Circuit Court of Appeals rejected the Corps' interpretation, and suggested that the regulation would create a taking without just compensation in violation of the Fifth Amendment.

In its decision, the Supreme Court held that in order to be within the regulatory authority of the United States, these semi-aquatic characteristics would have to be the result of frequent flooding by the nearby navigable waters. But the Supreme Court rejected the attempt to narrow the Corps of Engineer's regulatory reach. Perhaps some particular properties might in individual cases be so adversely impacted that a taking might be found. But this would not justify overturning the regulation itself. "Governmental land-use regulation may under extreme circumstances amount to a 'taking' of the affected property. See, e.g., Williamson County Regional Planning Comm'n v. Hamilton Bank, 473 U.S. 172, 105 S.Ct. 3108, 87 L.Ed.2d 126 (1985); Penn Central Transportation Co. v. New York City, 438 U.S. 104, 98 S.Ct. 2646, 57 L.Ed.2d 631 (1978). But mere assertion of regulatory jurisdiction by a governmental body does not constitute a regulatory taking. See Hodel v. Virginia Surface Mining and Reclamation Association, 452 U.S. 264 (1981). A requirement that a person obtain a permit before engaging in a certain use of his or her property does not itself "take" the property in any sense: after all, the very existence of a permit system implies that permission may be granted, leaving the landowner free to use the property as desired. Moreover, even if the permit is denied, there may be other viable uses available to the owner. "[e]quitable relief is not available to enjoin an alleged taking of private property for a public use, duly authorized by law, when a suit for compensation can be brought against the sovereign subsequent to a taking." Ruckelshaus v. Monsanto Co., 467 U.S. 986 (1984) This maxim rests on the principle that so long as compensation is available for those whose property is in fact taken, the governmental action is not unconstitutional.

=== Hodel v. Irving ===
Less than a decade after the Andrus decision, the Court found there to be a taking when the government took only a single strand of the bundle of property – the right to pass property to one's heirs. On Indian reservations, property belonging to Native Americans was often fractionated, meaning that with each generation a parcel's ownership could be divided up between more and more heirs, making it extremely difficult to put the property to economic use. To solve this problem, Congress passed the Indian Lands Consolidation Act, stopping interests in land constituting less than 2% of the total ownership from being further divided up through a will or by intestate succession (property that passes without a will upon the death of the owner). Instead such interests would become property of the tribes. In Hodel v. Irving, 481 U.S. 704 (1987), the Supreme Court held that a "complete abolition of both the descent and devise of a particular class of property may be a taking." It found that even though only a single strand of the property was affected, it was nevertheless an uncompensated taking that violated the Fifth Amendment. There was some disagreement among the concurring justices whether this decision affected Andrus, with Justices Rehnquist, Scalia and Powell finding it limited Andrus to its facts, while Justices Brennan, Marshall and Stevens opined that Andrus was unaffected. In 1997, the Court found a successor statute similarly unconstitutional as an uncompensated taking in Youpee v. Babbit, 519 U.S. 234 (1997).

=== First English Evangelical Lutheran Church v. City of Los Angeles ===
In First English Evangelical Lutheran Church v. City of Los Angeles, 482 U.S. 304 (1987), the case involved a church campground that was destroyed after a fire raged upstream, causing a massive flood to sweep through the area. The church, located in Glendale, California, applied for permission to rebuild the campground. However, by the time the application was made, the City of Los Angeles had enacted an ordinance that prohibited construction in flood zones, which included the area where the campground was located. When the city denied the permit to rebuild, the church sued, claiming that the denial amounted to a taking under the Fifth Amendment, which prohibits the government from taking private property without just compensation. The church argued that the ordinance deprived them of their property rights without compensation. The trial court ruled that no compensation was due for the regulatory taking, asserting that the only remedy available was to invalidate the permit denial. Essentially, the court said that if the church was not allowed to rebuild, they could challenge the decision, but there was no need for the government to pay compensation. The case eventually reached the U.S. Supreme Court, where Justice Rehnquist delivered the majority opinion. The Court ruled that simply invalidating the permit denial was insufficient. The Court held that a temporary taking had occurred, as the regulation effectively prevented the church from using its land for an extended period. The Court emphasized that the church was entitled to just compensation for the time during which its property was restricted by the ordinance. This decision clarified that even temporary regulatory restrictions that significantly impair property use require compensation, marking an important development in the law surrounding regulatory takings.

=== Lucas v. South Carolina Coastal Council ===
In Lucas v. South Carolina Coastal Council, the U.S. Supreme Court ruled that a State regulation that deprives a property owner of all economically beneficial use of that property can be a taking. Lucas had purchased two residential lots on a South Carolina barrier island, intending to build single-family homes such as those on the immediately adjacent parcels. At that time, Lucas's lots were not subject to the State's coastal zone building permit requirements. In 1988, however, the state legislature enacted the Beachfront Management Act, which barred Lucas from erecting any permanent habitable structures on his parcels. He filed suit against respondent state agency, contending that, even though the Act may have been a lawful exercise of the State's police power, the ban on construction deprived him of all "economically viable use" of his property and therefore effected a "taking" under the Fifth and Fourteenth Amendments that required the payment of just compensation. The court further clarified, however, that a regulation is not a taking if it is consistent with "restrictions that background principles of the State's law of property and nuisance already placed upon ownership." As an example of "background principles," the court referred to the right of government to prevent flooding of others' property. The Court noted:

A review of the relevant decisions demonstrates that the "harmful or noxious use" principle was merely this Court's early formulation of the police power justification necessary to sustain (without compensation) any regulatory diminution in value; that the distinction between regulation that "prevents harmful use" and that which "confers benefits" is difficult, if not impossible, to discern on an objective, value-free basis; and that, therefore, noxious-use logic cannot be the basis for departing from this Court's categorical rule that total regulatory takings must be compensated. ... Although it seems unlikely that common-law principles would have prevented the erection of any habitable or productive improvements on Lucas's land, this state-law question must be dealt with on remand. To win its case, respondent cannot simply proffer the legislature's declaration that the uses Lucas desires are inconsistent with the public interest, or the conclusory assertion that they violate a common-law maxim such as sic utere tuo ut alienum non laedas, but must identify background principles of nuisance and property law that prohibit the uses Lucas now intends in the property's present circumstances.

Lucas was remanded to the South Carolina Supreme Court which in turn remanded it to the trial court for a valuation trial. However, the case settled when the state bought Lucas' property and later resold it to a developer.

=== Palazzolo v. Rhode Island ===
On June 28, 2001, the Court issued its opinion in Palazzolo v. Rhode Island, 533 U.S. 606 (2001). Palazzolo addressed two issues: When is a takings claim ripe? When does notice of a preexisting regulation destroy the right to challenge the application of that regulation? For forty years, the plaintiff's corporation owned a valuable parcel of property in the town of Westerly, Rhode Island. The property consisted of roughly eighteen acres of wetlands and a small indeterminate amount of uplands. The land was divided into seventy-four parcels in two subdivision map filings that occurred in 1936 and 1959. Like the neighboring homes, the only way to develop Mr. Palazzolo's land is to raise the grade with fill.

In 1971, the Rhode Island Legislature authorized the Coastal Resources Management Council (CRMC) to regulate the filling of coastal wetlands. The CRMC promulgated regulations requiring that any filling of coastal salt marsh, such as that found on the plaintiff's property, meet certain public interest requirements. CRMC had ruled that private housing does not meet this public interest requirement. Prior to the adoption of this regulatory regime, the plaintiff applied twice to utilize the property but each time the State withdrew its approval, and the plaintiff did not appeal.

As a preliminary issue the Supreme Court addressed the question whether Palazzolo's case was "ripe" for review by the Courts. The central question, the Court found, was whether the plaintiff had obtained a final decision from the Council determining the permitted use for the land. A number of previous cases had established "the important principle that a landowner may not establish a taking before a land-use authority has the opportunity, using its own reasonable procedures, to decide and explain the reach of a challenged regulation: A final decision does not occur until the responsible agency determines the extent of permitted development on the land. MacDonald, Sommer & Frates v. Yolo County, 477 U.S. 340, 351.

On the question of whether the plaintiff could proceed with a taking claim after he acquired the property in his personal capacity from his corporation after the regulations were already in place, the Court held that he could. As Justice Kennedy, writing for the majority said:

Were the Court to accept that rule, the postenactment transfer of title would absolve the State of its obligation to defend any action restricting land use, no matter how extreme or unreasonable. A State would be allowed, in effect, to put an expiration date on the Takings Clause. This ought not to be the rule. Future generations, too, have a right to challenge unreasonable limitations on the use and value of land.

=== Lingle v. Chevron U.S.A. Inc. ===
In Lingle v. Chevron U.S.A. Inc., 544 U.S. 528 (2005), Chevron challenged Hawaii’s Gasoline Dealer Rent Cap Act, which limited the rent oil companies could charge independent gas station lessees, claiming it was an unconstitutional regulatory taking. Relying on Agins v. Tiburon, Chevron argued the law failed to "substantially advance a legitimate state interest." The Supreme Court, in a unanimous opinion by Justice O’Connor, rejected this argument, holding that the “substantially advances” test was a due process standard, not a valid test under the Takings Clause. The Court clarified that regulatory takings analysis should focus on the extent of the property burden, not the effectiveness of the regulation, and upheld the law.

=== Horne v. Department of Agriculture ===
In Horne v. Department of Agriculture, the Supreme Court addressed a federal program that required raisin farmers to set aside a portion of their crop without compensation for the National Raisin Reserve. The purpose of the reserve was to stabilize prices by controlling supply. Marvin Horne, a raisin grower, refused to comply and was fined $680,000 (equivalent to $923,628 in 2025), the estimated value of the raisins he withheld. Horne challenged the fine and argued that the mandatory surrender of raisins amounted to a physical taking of personal property without just compensation, violating the Fifth Amendment. In Horne I (2013), the Court held that Horne had standing to bring his takings claim. In Horne II (2015), the Court ruled in Horne’s favor and held that the government’s appropriation of the raisins was a per se physical taking and unconstitutional without just compensation.

=== Knick v. Township of Scott, Pennsylvania ===
In Knick v. Township of Scott, Pennsylvania (2019), Rose Mary Knick challenged a local ordinance passed by Scott Township that required landowners to allow public access to their private property to search for old burial grounds. When Knick refused entry to her 90-acre property, the township initiated enforcement action against her. She filed a lawsuit in federal court, claiming that the ordinance constituted a physical taking of her property in violation of the Fifth Amendment. However, her case was dismissed based on Williamson County (1985) and San Remo Hotel (2005), which required plaintiffs to seek state remedies before filing in federal court. The Supreme Court, in a majority opinion by Chief Justice Roberts, reversed the dismissal and overruled the prior precedents, holding that a property owner can bring a federal takings claim in federal court as soon as the alleged taking occurs, without first exhausting state remedies.

=== Cedar Point Nursery v. Hassid ===
In Cedar Point Nursery v. Hassid (2021), Cedar Point Nurseries challenged a provision of the 1975 California Agricultural Labor Relations Act, which required agricultural employers to allow union organizers onto their private property for up to three hours per day, 120 days per year. Following a disruptive entry by union organizers, the nursery filed suit, claiming the regulation amounted to a physical taking of property. In a majority opinion by Chief Justice Roberts, the Supreme Court agreed, holding that the regulation constituted a per se physical taking under the Fifth Amendment. The Court reasoned that granting union organizers access was akin to granting an easement, and while limited government access such as for health and safety inspections may be permissible, the mandated union access was an unconstitutional invasion of property rights.

=== Tyler v. Hennepin County ===
In Tyler v. Hennepin County (2023), Geraldine Tyler fell behind on $2,700 (equivalent to $2,853 in 2025) in property taxes after moving out of her condominium in St. Paul, Minnesota. With added penalties and interest, her total debt reached $15,000 (equivalent to $15,850 in 2025). Hennepin County foreclosed on the property and sold it for $40,000 (equivalent to $42,267 in 2025), keeping the entire amount and returning none of the $25,000 surplus (equivalent to $26,417 in 2025). Tyler sued, alleging a violation of the Fifth Amendment’s Takings Clause. The County argued that under state law, Tyler forfeited all rights to the property and its equity upon default. In a unanimous decision authored by Chief Justice Roberts, the Supreme Court held that retaining surplus proceeds constitutes a taking, ruling that the excess belonged to Tyler, not the government.

== Regulatory restriction on use of property and takings ==
In contrast, a regulation restricting the use of property to further legitimate public ends, will not be considered a taking merely because it impairs the value or the utility of that land. However, when the regulation goes too far (as Justice Holmes put it in Pennsylvania Coal Co. v. Mahon), it will be judicially recognized as the equivalent of a taking which may not take place without payment of just compensation to the property's owner.

The issue of regulatory takings arises from the interaction between exercise of the traditional police power and exercise of eminent domain. The police power is the inherent state government power, to do what is reasonably necessary to promote and protect public health, safety, welfare and morals.

=== Zoning restrictions ===
In Hadacheck v. Sebastian, 239 U.S. 394 (1915), the Court upheld a municipal ordinance prohibiting brickyard operations within specific residential neighborhoods, despite the impact on a long-established business. In Village of Euclid v. Ambler Realty Co., 272 U.S. 365 (1926), the Court sustained a zoning ordinance that barred industrial uses in certain areas, even though it significantly reduced the land’s market value. In Gorieb v. Fox, 274 U.S. 603 (1927), the Court upheld a setback requirement mandating that portions of a parcel be left unbuilt. Similarly, in Welch v. Swasey, 214 U.S. 91 (1909), the Court affirmed the constitutionality of a law imposing height restrictions on buildings. In each of these cases, the regulation was upheld as a valid exercise of the state's police power, notwithstanding its adverse effect on property interests or interference with the most beneficial use of the land.

Governmental land-use regulations that deny the property owner all economically viable use are deemed a taking of the affected property. See, e.g., Lucas v. South Carolina Coastal Council, 505 U.S. 1003 (1992), First English Evangelical Lutheran Church v. County of Los Angeles (1987). The general approach to this question was summed up in Agins v. City of Tiburon, 447 U.S. 255 (1980), which states that the application of land-use regulations to a particular piece of property is a taking only "if the ordinance does not substantially advance legitimate state interests ... or denies an owner economically viable use of his land." However, in Lingle v. Chevron, 544 U.S. 528 (2005), the Supreme Court overruled the "substantially advance" criterion of a taking. When a government regulation effects a taking of private property by such excessive regulation, the owner may initiate inverse condemnation proceedings to recover the just compensation for the taking of his or her property, provided that procedural hurdles have been overcome.

In the early twenty-first century, the concept of regulatory taking became more loosely used—outside the constitutional sense—by property rights groups, extending to include regulations that reduce property values by lesser amounts. Ballot initiatives based on this interpretation (such as Oregon's Measure 37) were advanced in at least seven states in the years 2000 to 2006. All these states are in the American west, but a significant portion of the funding for the initiatives came from sources on the east coast.

=== Inverse condemnation ===
Inverse condemnation is a term which describes a claim brought against the government in which a property owner seeks compensation for a `taking' of his property under the Fifth Amendment. In states that prohibit uncompensated taking or damaging, physical damage to property is included in this definition. The term "inverse" is used, because usually condemnations are brought by the government. In the inverse condemnation context, it is the property owner who sues the government, alleging a taking (or damaging) of property without just compensation.

== Exactions and Takings ==
Land-use exactions and permit conditions are governed by the Nollan-Dolan rule. In Nollan v. California Coastal Commission, the Supreme Court adopted a test to determine when an exaction is a taking: the municipality "must demonstrate an 'essential nexus' between a harm identified with the proposed development and the required exaction." In Dolan, the Court clarified that there had to be a rough proportionality between the exaction and the impact of the proposed development. It has been suggested by scholars that in exaction cases, the government gives the regulation heightened scrutiny akin to rational basis with bite. Subsequent cases, such as Koontz v. St. Johns River Water Management District and Sheetz v. County of El Dorado, extended this doctrine to encompass monetary exactions, even when such demands are imposed by legislative bodies.

=== Nollan v. California Coastal Commission ===
In Nollan v. California Coastal Commission, the Court reviewed a regulation under which the California Coastal Commission demanded a lateral public easement across the plaintiffs' beachfront lot in exchange for a permit to demolish an existing bungalow and replace it with a three-bedroom two-story house. The public easement was designed to connect two public beaches that were separated by property belonging to the plaintiffs and their neighbors. The Coastal Commission had asserted that the public easement condition was imposed to promote the legitimate state interest of diminishing the "blockage of the view of the ocean" caused by construction of the larger house. The Court observed that requiring a dedication of private property in exchange for a building permit was "an out-and-out plan of extortion" unless it could be shown that the private development imposed a burden on public facilities or resources, and the dedication would mitigate such impact. This became known as the "essential nexus" between a legitimate state interest and the permit condition.

=== Dolan v. City of Tigard ===
In Dolan v. City of Tigard, 512 U.S. 374 (1994) the Court evaluated further the degree of the connection required between permit conditions and impacts caused by a development. In that case, a business owner sought to expand a plumbing supply store on property adjacent to a floodplain and sought to pave more parking spaces for the store. The City of Tigard, Oregon, conditioned the building on the owner creating a public greenway and building a bike path on the land. The City justified the conditions as necessary to prevent flooding and traffic congestion. The Supreme Court ruled that the city's requirement would be a taking if the City did not show that there was a reasonable relationship between the creation of the greenway and bike path and the impact of the development. Moreover, such an exaction had to be roughly proportional to the impact. "Without question, had the city simply required petitioner to dedicate a strip of land along Fanno Creek for public use, rather than conditioning the grant of her permit to redevelop her property on such a dedication, a taking would have occurred," the Court held. "Such public access would deprive petitioner of the right to exclude others, "one of the most essential sticks in the bundle of rights that are commonly characterized as property."

=== Koontz v. St. Johns Water Management District ===
The Nollan and Dolan cases had previously held that permit exactions had to have an essential nexus and be roughly proportional to impacts caused by the permitted development. Both cases involved the dedication of land – an easement in Nollan and a public easement and bicycle path in Dolan. Left unanswered was the question whether an exaction demand of money was subject to the nexus and proportionality tests. In Koontz v. St. Johns Water Management District, The plaintiff sought permission to build a 3.7 acre shopping center on 14.9 acres of property, much of which was wetlands. The Water District agreed to provide the permit so long as Koontz dedicate 11 acres and spend money fixing up the drainage on district property several miles away. Koontz sued, not over the dedication of the land but over the requirement that he spend money on district property. The Supreme Court of Florida held that the holdings of Nollan and Dolan did not apply because they involved exaction demands for land, as opposed to money. The Supreme Court reversed, finding that the cases were concerned about demands for property and that because money is a form of property, a monetary exaction is subject to those tests.

== Regulatory taking themes ==
=== Permit exhaustion ===
One precondition of a regulatory takings claim is that the claimant must obtain a final decision by the regulating entity as to what uses will be permitted. The Supreme Court's decisions make it clear that the mere assertion of regulatory jurisdiction by a governmental body does not constitute a regulatory taking. See Hodel v. Virginia Surface Mining and Reclamation Association, 452 U.S. 264, 293–297(1981):

The reasons are obvious. A requirement that a person obtain a permit before engaging in a certain use of his or her property does not itself "take" the property in any sense: after all, the very existence of a permit system implies that permission may be granted, leaving the landowner free to use the property as desired. Moreover, even if the permit is denied, there may be other viable uses available to the owner. Only when a permit is denied and the effect of the denial is to prevent "economically viable" use of the land in question can it be said that a taking has occurred.

— United States v. Riverside Bayview Homes, 474 US 121 (1985)

In Palazzolo, the Court held that the case was ripe because Palazzolo had applied for multiple permits and it was clear what could or could not be done with the property.

==== Takings per se ====
The Supreme Court has established a number of tests under which a state regulation constitutes a taking per se. These are physical invasion (as in Loretto Teleprompter), denial of all economically viable private property uses (as in Lucas), or requiring the owners to dedicate some of their property to the government without a justifying reason for so doing (as in Nollan, Dolan, and Koontz). For example, when the owners' proposed land use will result in a significant increase in traffic they may be required to dedicate a strip of their land to improve an adjacent road.

But when an action does not fall into a category addressed by one of these tests, the Court relies primarily on an ad hoc inquiry into the specifics of such individual case. This test was established in Penn Central v. City of New York, which described the most relevant factors to be the owners investment-backed expectations, the economic impact of the regulation, and the character of the government action. This approach has been the subject of much criticism because of its unpredictability.

==== The denominator problem ====
In Penn Central, the Supreme Court ruled that takings law does not divide property into discrete segments. Thus, the property interest in question during a taking case is the whole parcel of land and not a discrete sliver of it. This gave rise to the question of what is the "denominator" of the ownership fraction; i.e., what is the larger ownership whose part is being subjected to confiscatory regulation, since the regulatory taking of a part of it (the "numerator") is not compensable.

In Murr v. Wisconsin, 137 S. Ct. 1933 (2017), the Court held that denominator is best assessed through a multi-factor balancing test that includes such factors as "the treatment of the land, in particular how it is bounded or divided, under state and local law," the "physical characteristics of the landowner’s property," and "the value of the property under the challenged regulation."

The policy underlying the whole parcel rule is that it is "essential to an interpretation of the takings clause that leaves any room for public planning and regulation of land uses."

== The role of public interest advocacy in regulatory takings cases ==
The development of regulatory takings jurisprudence is notable for the contribution made by public interest advocates from both the conservationist and property rights advocacy camps. Both the property rights advocacy organizations and many conservation-oriented organizations have submitted numerous amicus briefs in virtually all the major regulatory takings cases at the Supreme Court as well as in a number of appellate courts. While the property rights advocacy organizations generally argue for greater protections for property rights, and compensation when those rights are taken, the conservation-oriented entities argue that government owes no compensation when it regulates to promote public health, safety and conservation values.

One of the more prominent advocates on behalf of property rights has been the Pacific Legal Foundation, which represented the landowners in Nollan v. California Coastal Commission, Suitum v. Tahoe Regional Planning Authority, Palazzolo v. Rhode Island, Koontz v. St. Johns Water Management District, and Murr v. Wisconsin, Cedar Point v. Hassid, Tyler v. Hennepin County, and Sheetz v. El Dorado County. Another non-profit, Oregonians in Action, represented Mrs. Dolan in her battle with the City of Tigard. Likewise, Mountain States Legal Foundation represented the landowner in Brandt v. United States, a case where a railroad-right-of-way had been taken by the federal government.

On the other side of the debate, the State of Hawaii was represented by Vermont Law School Professor John Echeverria in Lingle v. Chevron, and who has worked with the Audubon Society and Community Rights Council.
