= Inverse condemnation =

Legal concept in property law

Inverse condemnation is a legal concept and cause of action used by property owners when a governmental entity takes an action which damages or decreases the value of private property without obtaining ownership of the property through the use of eminent domain. Thus, unlike the typical eminent domain case, the property owner is the plaintiff and not the defendant.

In the United States of America, inverse condemnation actions are filed against the federal government pursuant to the Takings Clause of the 5th Amendment to the United States Constitution, and against state governments under that clause or similar clauses found in most state constitutions.

== History of inverse condemnation in the United States ==
=== Early republic to the 1920s ===
Since the early days of the United States, inverse condemnation claims have been brought under the Takings Clause which states that private property shall not "be taken without just compensation". It is generally accepted by legal scholars that the clause "was originally understood to apply only to physical seizures of property" and was not interpreted as expansively as it is today.

The doctrine was first applied to regulations of property after the U.S. Supreme Court's seminal decision in Pennsylvania Coal Co. v. Mahon. In Mahon, the Court held that a Pennsylvania law which "barred coal mining if it would cause the land at the surface to subside" was unconstitutional. In Mahon, Justice Oliver Wendell Holmes, writing for the court, "established the proposition that 'while property may be regulated to a certain extent, if regulation goes too far it will be recognized as a taking.'"

=== 1930s to the 1990s ===
For a number of decades, Mahon was an outlier case. However, jurists began to embrace the regulatory takings doctrine more after the emergence of the modern property rights movement in the 1970s, particularly the formation of the Pacific Legal Foundation in 1971, and the publication in 1985 of Richard A. Epstein's book, Takings.

In particular, the doctrine was expanded by three Supreme Court cases in the 1980s. In those cases, the Court "reaffirmed" the diminution in value test originating in Mahon, created the unconstitutional conditions doctrine for exactions, and "held an interim regulation could be considered a temporary taking".

In 1991, the Court further expanded the doctrine with its seminal decision in Lucas v. South Carolina Coastal Council, where it held that a governmental regulation that deprived a land of all value constituted a taking. Thus, during the late twentieth century, the discussion of regulatory takings predominated the discussion of inverse condemnation in legal academia.

=== 2000s to 2020 ===
In 2013, the Supreme Court in Horne v. Department of Agriculture held that the Takings Clause applies to personal property as well as real property.

A study of inverse condemnation claims filed in federal courts from the years 2000 to 2014 found that most arose out of "alleged physical invasions or direct appropriations of property interests, with most arising out of military airplane flights, flooding, or conversions of railroad lines to recreational trails."

=== Cedar Point Nursery v. Hassid (2021) ===
In 2021, the Supreme Court further expanded and muddled the inverse condemnation doctrine in Cedar Point Nursery v. Hassid. In Cedar Point, the Court ruled that "a California regulation that permits union organizers to enter the property of agricultural business to talk with employees about supporting a union [was] unconstitutional" because it appropriated a right to invade the property owner's property without paying just compensation for said right. In that decision, Chief Justice John Roberts, writing for the 6-3 majority, created a new per se takings rule, finding that when "the government enacts a regulation authorizing a temporary invasion of a property owner's land, it effects a per se taking under the Fifth Amendment for which it must pay just compensation."

One property law textbook author has stated that the decision upended four decades of takings jurisprudence. In particular, the author believed that the case did not follow precedent and that it conflated regulatory takings with the Court's exactions doctrine. Other legal scholars have noted that the decision departed from prior precedent by not using the Penn Central test to analyze the impact of a government regulation.

== Legal tests for inverse condemnation causes of action under the Fifth Amendment ==
=== Direct acquisition ===
It is a taking "when the government physically takes possession of property without acquiring title to it." If the government's action constitutes a taking, it must pay just compensation for the property acquired.

=== Regulatory takings ===
The doctrine of regulatory takings "is a mix of per se rules and balancing tests, with an ample amount of ambiguity thrown in." Most cases involving regulatory takings are "evaluated under the multifactor balancing test established in Penn Central Transportation Co. v. New York City, which requires that a court examine, among other factors, the regulation's economic impact on the property owner, its degree of interference with the owner's reasonable investment-backed expectations, and the property's character to determine whether a regulation goes far enough to characterize it as a taking."

=== Nuisance-based takings ===
Despite commentators and jurists often dividing inverse condemnation cases into two categories (physical takings and regulatory takings), a third form of inverse condemnation exists: nuisance-based takings. The doctrine of nuisance-based takings "consists of cases where the government (or a third party acting pursuant to explicit governmental authority) uses its own property in ways that interfere with the ability of other owners to use and enjoy their properties".

=== Unconstitutional exactions ===
An exaction is a government-imposed condition on the development of land which requires developers to mitigate anticipated negative impacts of the development. The Supreme Court of the United States has identified several criteria for identifying when an exaction, including monetary exactions, becomes a taking that requires compensation under the Fifth Amendment.

In Nollan v. California Coastal Commission, the Court ruled that an exaction is constitutional if it shares an "essential nexus" with the reasons that would allow rejection of the permit altogether.

Moreover, in Dolan v. City of Tigard, the Court added that an exaction is constitutional only if the public benefit from the exaction is "roughly proportional" to the burden imposed on the public by allowing the proposed land use. The government imposing the exaction has the burden to prove the existence of "rough proportionality" between the ends and means.

== Legal process ==
Unlike the typical eminent domain case, the property owner is the plaintiff and not the defendant. The Takings Clause may be enforced against the federal government or against states through incorporation of the 5th Amendment through the Fourteenth Amendment. Moreover, inverse condemnation cases may also arise under state constitutions, most of which include a Takings clause which are interpreted similarly to the Takings Clause in the federal constitution.

Inverse condemnation claims against the federal government are typically brought in the United States Court of Federal Claims and appealed to the Federal Circuit.

== Criticism of the doctrine ==
Inverse condemnation has long had a reputation in legal academia as being "muddled", a "confusing mess", and "incoherent".

Environmentalists are the foremost critics of the doctrine of regulatory takings because environmentalists see the doctrine as "a threat to modern environmental laws". However, one empirical study discounted this view—finding that regulatory takings had become "an eclectic sideshow to the United States' grand struggles over regulatory policy."

Another common critique of the doctrine from various legal academics is that the doctrine does not adhere to the original intent of the Fifth Amendment.

== See also ==
- Cedar Point Nursery v. Hassid
- Eminent domain in the United States
- Fifth Amendment to the United States Constitution
- Lucas v. South Carolina Coastal Council
- Loretto v. Teleprompter Manhattan CATV Corp.
- Richards v. Washington Terminal Co
