= Keystone Bituminous Coal Ass'n v. DeBenedictis =

Keystone Bituminous Coal Association v. DeBenedictis
- Supreme Court of the United States

Argued November 10, 1986 Decided March 9, 1987
- Full case name: Keystone Bituminous Coal Association v. DeBenedictis, Secretary, Pennsylvania Department of Environmental Resources, et al.
- Citations: 480 U.S. 470 (more) 107 S. Ct. 1232; 94 L. Ed. 2d 472; 1987 U.S. LEXIS 2880

Case history
- Prior: Summary judgment granted, Keystone Bituminous Coal Ass'n v. DeBenedictis, 581 F. Supp. 511 (W.D. Pa. 1984); affimed sub nom. Keystone Bituminous Coal Ass'n v. Duncan, 771 F.2d 707 (3d Cir. 1985), cert. granted, 475 U.S. 1080 (1986).

Holding
- Sections 4 and 6 of the Subsidence Act did not constitute a taking of petitioners' private property without just compensation, so there was no violation of the Fifth and Fourteenth Amendments.

Court membership
- Chief Justice William Rehnquist Associate Justices William J. Brennan Jr. · Byron White; Thurgood Marshall · Harry Blackmun; Lewis F. Powell Jr. · John P. Stevens; Sandra Day O'Connor · Antonin Scalia

Case opinions
- Majority: Stevens, joined by Brennan, White, Marshall, Blackmun
- Dissent: Rehnquist, joined by Powell, O'Connor, Scalia

Laws applied
- U.S. Const. amend. V

Keystone Bituminous Coal Ass'n v. DeBenedictis, 480 U.S. 470 (1987), is a United States Supreme Court case interpreting the Fifth Amendment's Takings Clause. In this case, the court upheld a Pennsylvania statute which limited coal mining causing damage to buildings, dwellings, and cemeteries through subsidence.

== Background ==
Pennsylvania enacted the Subsidence Act in 1966 "to prevent or minimize subsidence and to regulate its consequences." In other words, the Subsidence Act was designed to prevent the harmful effects that underground mining can have on the surface above. Some examples of coal mine subsidence damage include cracked foundations, sinkholes, and groundwater loss.

In 1982, the Keystone Light Bituminous Coal Association, an association formed by four coal companies, brought an action in the United States District Court for the Western District of Pennsylvania. They sought to enjoin the Secretary of the Pennsylvania Department of Environmental Resources (DER), Nicholas DeBenedictis, and his lower officers, from enforcing the Bituminous Mine Subsidence and Land Conservation Act (Subsidence Act) and its implementing regulations.

The petitioners challenged two sections of the Subsidence Act. First, they challenged Section 4, which "[P]rohibits mining that causes subsidence damage to three categories of structures . . . : [1.] public buildings and noncommercial buildings generally used by the public; [2.] dwellings used for human habitation; and [3.] cemeteries." Second, the petitioners challenged Section 6 of the Act. This section "[A]uthorizes the DER to revoke a mining permit if the removal of coal causes damage to a structure or area protected by Section 4 and the operator has not . . . [done any of the following within six months: 1.] repaired the damage, [2.] satisfied any claim arising [from the damage], or [3.] deposited a sum equal to the reasonable cost of repair with the DER as security."

In their complaint, the petitioners contended that "Pennsylvania recognizes three separate estates in land: The mineral estate; the surface estate; and the 'support estate.'" All but 10% of the coal to be mined by the petitioners was severed from the surface estates around the turn of the 20th century. However, surface owners generally waived any claims against petitioners or prior coal companies for damages caused by mining.

Relying on the Supreme Court’s decision in Pennsylvania Coal Co. v. Mahon (1922), the petitioners’ primary argument was that Sections 4 and 6 of the Subsidence Act violated the Takings Clause of the Constitution's Fifth and Fourteenth Amendments by taking their property without providing just compensation. They also argued that Section 6 violated the Constitution's Contracts Clause.

The petitioners' main contention was that one restriction imposed by the DER is that "50% of the coal beneath structures protected by § 4" must be left unearthed to support the surface land, and that consequently their "support estate[s] had been entirely destroyed" because they had to leave 50% of the coal beneath the surface in place, so they could only mine the mineral estate while leaving the support estate untouched. In answers to interrogatories, the petitioners claimed that from 1966 to 1982 their land use rights at their 13 coal mines had been restricted to the point of a taking because of the Subsidence Act. As a result, they claimed that they had to leave about 27 million tons of coal in place. Altogether, these mines contained at least 1.46 billion tons of coal. The percentage of coal that had to remain unmined was less than 2% of the petitioners' total coal.

== Procedural history ==
The District Court held that Pennsylvania Coal Co. v. Mahon did not apply and that there was not a taking. Finding "that the Subsidence Act served valid public purposes," the District Court determined that the Act was a legitimate exercise of the state's police power. In response to the petitioners' support estate argument, the District Court found that "[T]he support estate consists of a bundle of rights, including some that were not affected by the Act." In essence, the District Court recognized that the support estate was a separate estate in land, but that the Act did not effect a taking of the whole support estate involved in this case. The District Court also rejected the Contracts Clause claim because the petitioners did not present evidence that the Act "had impaired any contract to which the Commonwealth was a party."

The Court of Appeals found that there was not a taking and affirmed the holding of the District Court. It also found that Pennsylvania Coal Co. v. Mahon did not apply. The Court of Appeals took a different approach to analyzing the support estate than the District Court did and "[C]onsidered the support estate as just one segment of a larger bundle of rights that invariably includes either the surface estate or the mineral estate." So, instead of finding that there were three separate estates in land, the Court of Appeals decided that the support estate was not a separate estate in land. Instead, the support estate was to be included as part of the surface estate or the mineral estate. By combining the support estate with the surface estate or the mineral estate, the petitioners' "bundle of rights" became larger. Therefore, the Court of Appeals found that "'their entire 'bundle' of property rights ha[d] not been destroyed.'" In addition, the Court of Appeals affirmed the District Court's holding concerning the Contracts Clause claim.

Both lower courts cited Andrus v. Allard (1979), a Supreme Court case describing the "bundle of rights" that a property owner possesses. Relying on Andrus, both courts found that the support estate was just a "'strand'" in a larger bundle of rights. According to these courts, the Act had to effect a taking of the combined bundle of the surface estate, support estate, and mineral estate to be deemed a taking.

== Majority opinion ==
When Keystone was argued before the Supreme Court in 1986, its facts were strikingly similar to the facts of Pennsylvania Coal Co. v. Mahon. However, the Court began its opinion by rejecting the petitioners' argument that Pennsylvania Coal Co. v. Mahon should control in this case because "[T]he similarities . . . [between the two cases were] far less significant than the differences," and concluded that there was no taking.

Citing prior takings cases, the Court listed two factors that must be considered when evaluating whether a taking has occurred. These factors suggest that a land use regulation will be deemed a taking if it 1) "'does not substantially advance legitimate state interests,'" or 2) "'denies an owner economically viable use of his land.'"

Using the two factors above, the Court found that the petitioners didn't meet their burden of proof in order to establish a taking. The Court found that the Subsidence Act "substantially advanced legitimate state interests" by trying to prevent "a significant threat to the common welfare" and that it wasn't "impossible for petitioners to profitably engage in their business."

According to the Court, the first difference between Pennsylvania Coal Co. v. Mahon and this case was that one act benefited a few and the other act benefited many. The Kohler Act challenged in Pennsylvania Coal Co. v. Mahon was intended to benefit a few private parties, while the Subsidence Act in this case was intended to benefit the general public. The Court stressed that the Kohler Act was not a legitimate exercise of the State's police power because it was only meant to protect "some private landowners' homes." Conversely, the Subsidence Act was a legitimate exercise of the State's police power because it was meant "to protect the public interest in health, the environment, and the fiscal integrity of the area." To be a legitimate exercise of the State's police power, "the nature of the State's action" must protect the general well-being of the community. Regulations protecting the general well-being of the community generally involve health, safety, or morals. In this case, the Court deferred to the Pennsylvania Legislature's finding "that important public interests are served by enforcing a policy that is designed to minimize subsidence in certain areas" because this purpose was "genuine, substantial, and legitimate." Basically, the Court found that the Subsidence Act was meant to protect the general well-being of the community, rather than just a select few in the community, and was an acceptable use of the police power.

Second, the Court pointed out that the two cases are distinguishable because they were decided at different points in time. The Subsidence Act showed that "'[C]ircumstances may so change in time ... as to clothe with such a [public] interest what at other times ... would be a matter of purely private concern.'" Therefore, during the 44 years between the Pennsylvania Coal Co. v. Mahon decision and the enactment of the Subsidence Act there was a change in the public's attitude toward regulations affecting private land.

A third difference between the two cases was that the mining being regulated in this case was compared to a public nuisance, while the mining being regulated in Pennsylvania Coal Co. v. Mahon was not. In this case, the Court held that there is not a taking if "the State merely restrains uses of property that are tantamount to public nuisances." This public nuisance argument is associated with the "'reciprocity of advantage'" analysis in takings law. Reciprocity of advantage means that people may have burdensome restrictions on their private property, but they will benefit greatly from the restrictions that are placed on others. Apparently, the Pennsylvania Coal Co. v. Mahon majority did not think there was a reciprocity of advantage in restricting the few private landowners' land use, but the Keystone majority did.

The last difference between the two cases was the diminution in value of the coal companies' properties. In Pennsylvania Coal Co. v. Mahon, "mining of 'certain coal'" was deemed "commercially impracticable" as a result of the Kohler Act. Here, the Court held that there was no "show[ing of] any deprivation significant enough to satisfy the heavy burden placed upon one alleging a regulatory taking." The Court categorized the cause of action in this case as a "facial challenge" to the Act. From the Court's perspective, the petitioners challenged the statute's possible consequences without showing that any actual injury had occurred. As the Court mentioned, there was no evidence that any of the petitioners' mines could "no longer be mined for profit."

In regulatory takings cases, the Court "compare[s] the value that has been taken from the property with the value that remains in the property." The property that the Court analyzed was the whole parcel, not "discrete segments" of the whole property. So, the Court found that the 27 million tons of coal to be left in place was not "a separate segment of property for takings law purposes." Instead, the Court looked at the petitioners' total amount of coal. For this reason, the Court decided that the Subsidence Act had not denied the petitioners "economically viable use" of their coal mine properties and that their "reasonable 'investment-backed expectations'" in the properties had not been "materially affected."

The Court denied the petitioners' argument that their support estate had been taken. It analogized the support estate in this case to the "air rights" above Grand Central Station in Penn Central Transportation Co. v. New York City (1978) and found that it was not "a separate segment of property for Takings Clause purposes." Declining to allow state law definitions of property interests to govern its takings analysis, the Court viewed Pennsylvania's three estates in land as one combined property interest.

Finally, the petitioners' Contract Clause violation claim alleged that Section 6 of the Subsidence Act interfered with the liability waivers that they had with surface property owners. Rejecting this claim, the Court held that the state's "strong public interest" in preventing subsidence outweighed any contractual obligations between surface property owners and the petitioners.

== Dissent ==
In his dissenting opinion, Chief Justice Rehnquist argued that the facts of this case were analogous to the facts of Pennsylvania Coal Co. v. Mahon and that the Subsidence Act effected a taking of the petitioners' property without just compensation.

To begin with, Rehnquist attacked the majority's view that Justice Holmes' opinion in PA Coal was "uncharacteristically ... advisory." Rehnquist believed that no part of the Pennsylvania Coal Co. v. Mahon opinion was advisory in nature. In fact, he found the majority's opinion "particularly disturbing" and believed that their disregard for Pennsylvania Coal Co. v. Mahon essentially ignored a case that "for 65 years [had] been the foundation of [the Court's] 'regulatory takings' jurisprudence." He pointed to the often quoted phrase from Pennsylvania Coal Co. v. Mahon that "'if regulation goes too far it will be recognized as a taking'" and listed five cases where it had been relied on in reaching an outcome. Rehnquist was very troubled by the fact that Pennsylvania Coal Co. v. Mahon had been cited and relied on as precedent in previous takings cases, but was now only considered to be advisory.

Rehnquist also disagreed with the majority because he felt that the Kohler Act in Pennsylvania Coal Co. v. Mahon was intended to benefit private parties and the general public. He argued that similar to the purpose of the Subsidence Act, the Kohler Act was intended to prevent damage to buildings, infrastructure, pipelines, and avoid injuries and deaths. So, he believed that both statutes had public purposes and were too similar to be distinguished. In his opinion, both statutes were designed to protect not only private interests, but public interests as well.

Pointing to precedent cases, Rehnquist didn’t believe that this case fell under the “nuisance exception” either. He argued that the majority expanded the nuisance exception concept farther than it should have by putting this case in that category. Instead, the nuisance exception should only encompass the "prevent[ion of] a misuse or illegal use."

Finally, Rehnquist argued it was incorrect for the majority to overlook Pennsylvania's three defined property interests. He disagreed with the majority's view that the 27 million tons of coal that couldn't be mined as a result of the Subsidence Act wasn't a separate property interest. Rehnquist pointed out that Pennsylvania divides property interests into three categories. These categories are "the support estate, the surface estate, and the mineral estate." Each interest is deemed separate from the other and may have separate owners in fee simple. For example, under Pennsylvania law, one person could own the surface estate, a second person could own the support estate, and a third person could own the mineral estate. If one owner purchased a mineral estate to mine and couldn't after the Subsidence Act was passed, then it reduced the value of that estate. Instead of considering the three separate estates in land, Rehnquist believed that the majority only considered a "broader, yet undefined, segment of property." Looking at this broader property interest led the majority to hold that there was no taking of the whole estate (the three separate estates combined). Rehnquist did not agree with the majority's analysis on this issue and would have found a taking.

== See also ==
- List of United States Supreme Court cases, volume 480
- Pennsylvania Coal Co. v. Mahon (1922)
- Penn Central Transportation Co. v. New York City (1978)
