= Grape Bay Ltd v A-G of Bermuda =

Grape Bay Ltd v Attorney-General of Bermuda
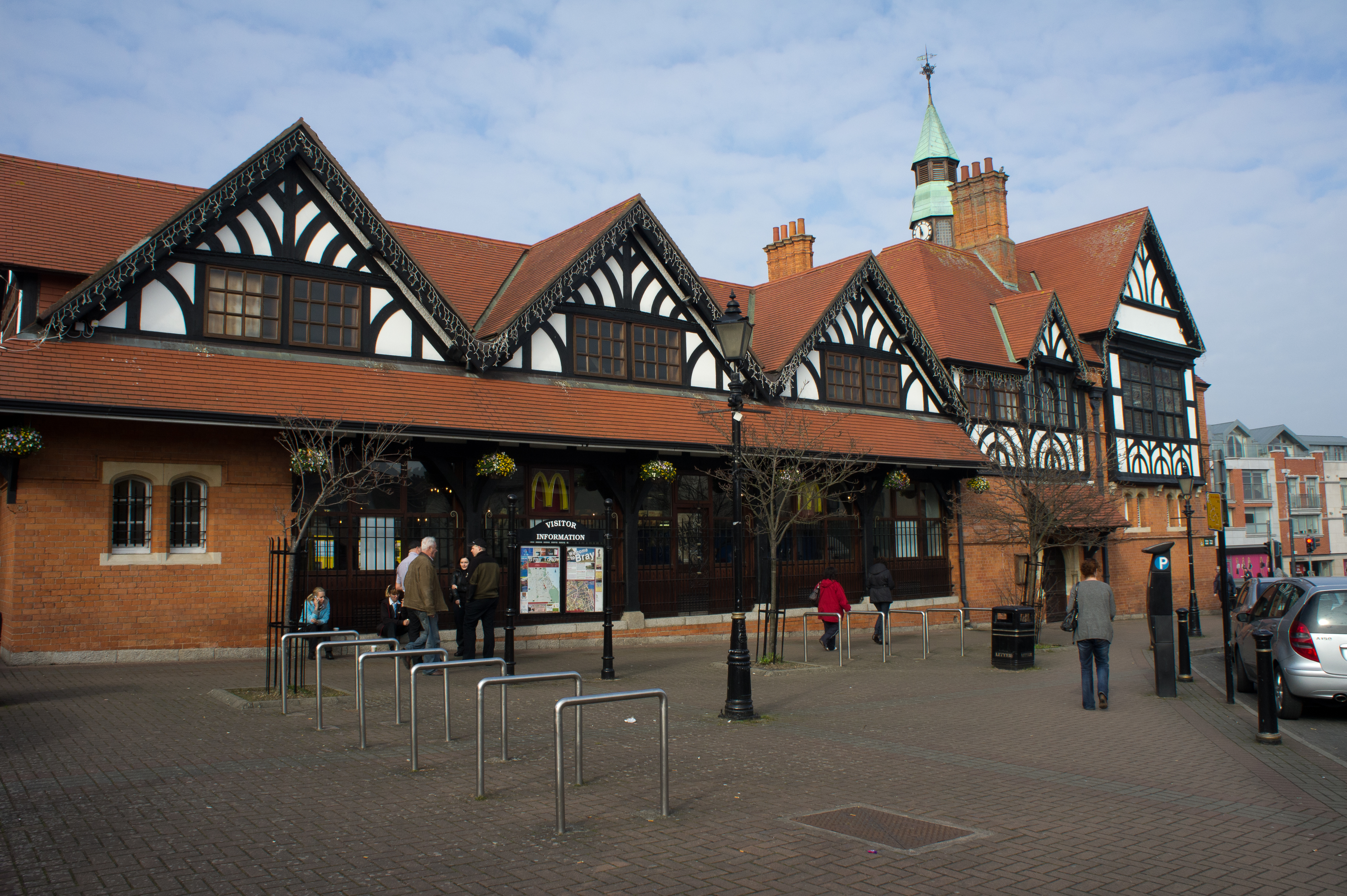
- A McDonald's restaurant, built in keeping, in Bray, Ireland. All new foreign corporation restaurants were/are banned in Bermuda.
- Court: Judicial Committee of the Privy Council
- Citations: [1999] UKPC 43, [2000] 1 WLR 574

Case history
- Prior action: Court of Appeal of Bermuda

Case opinions
- Lord Hoffmann

Keywords
- State prohibitions; devaluation of option agreements and preliminary development contracts; antitrust (real estate) planning law; retail law

Grape Bay Ltd v Attorney-General of Bermuda [1999] UKPC 43 is a case concerning expressly analogous principles to compulsory purchase by the Judicial Committee of the Privy Council and is important for English land law. It directly concerns a state prohibition which impacts a development that is underway, by agreement but not in any substantive physical form. It held that an Act passed by the Bermudian legislature to prevent foreign corporation restaurants from opening (including McDonald's) did not amount to a "regulatory taking" or an unconstitutional deprivation of property without compensation.

== Facts ==
McDonald's attempted to open a new branch in Bermuda, under the company name of Grape Bay Ltd. Residents objected, and a Bill was brought to the lower house to prohibit new foreign restaurants. It was defeated in the Senate of Bermuda, but a second reading followed. McDonald's was keen to press ahead and prepared to challenge it as unconstitutional. It passed as the Governor of Bermuda signed the Prohibited Restaurant Act 1997 stopping any non-Bermudian restaurant that was not already established from being set up. McDonald's filed a challenge under Articles 1(c) and 13 of the Bermudian Constitution, alleging that it had been deprived of property without compensation. It contended that although it owned no land in Bermuda yet, the various contracts and options it had entered into amounted to a "chose in action" that was being displaced (devalued) by the Act. The general right of property in article 13 is not taken, but the more general reference in article 1(c) to "protection for the privacy of his home and other property and from deprivation of property without compensation" was enough to cover their position.

== Advice ==
Lord Hoffmann advised that there was no deprivation of property, and so no breach of the Bermuda constitution. He considered similar provisions from the constitutions of Dominica, Mauritius, and Malta where there is a family resemblance under many UK Overseas Territories, stating a general principle and then more specific rights. However, it was unnecessary to decide whether more general declaratory rights were capable of enforcement in each situation because the act was not a deprivation of property in any case. His Lordship began his advice as follows.

2. The McDonald’s Corporation of Illinois has built up a successful world-wide business franchising the operation of fast food restaurants under its name and trade marks and in accordance with its standards. It has one of the best known brands in the world. But a consequence of this well-defined image is that some people feel that it does not fit into their own image of what their neighbourhood should be like. The result is that the prospect of the opening of a new McDonald’s restaurant sometimes arouses opposition and high passion among the local residents. This is what happened in Bermuda when the appellant, Grape Bay Limited ("Grape Bay") proposed to open several restaurants on the Islands under a franchise agreement with McDonald’s.

12. [...] On 17th January 1997 Grape Bay’s attorneys wrote back saying that the Bill was not yet law and their intentions were still the same. In any case, they had advised their clients that the Act, if passed, would be unconstitutional....

[...]

26. What property did Grape Bay have at the time when the Act was passed? It had the liberty (subject to the planning laws and the rights of McDonald’s to restrain any passing off or trade-mark infringement) to acquire premises and open a McDonald’s restaurant. In essence it is this liberty which the Act has removed. But such a liberty, shared with the rest of the population of Bermuda, is not private property. To avoid this difficulty, Grape Bay complains that it has been deprived of the "choses in action" which were hastily assembled as the Bill was about to become law. They are the benefit of the letter of intent, assigned to Grape Bay on 17th July 1997, the agreement to employ Mr. Goad-Savery, executed on 25th July 1997, the so-called guarantee and the grant of an option to rent premises, both granted by Sir John Swan on 27th July 1997. Grape Bay says that these choses in action are "property" and that the Act has made them worthless because the contingency on which they would have become operative and valuable, namely the opening of a McDonald’s Restaurant, cannot now occur.’

27. It is well settled that restrictions on the use of property imposed in the public interest by general regulatory laws do not constitute a deprivation of that property for which compensation should be paid. The best example is planning control (Westminster Bank Ltd v Beverley Borough Council [1971] AC 508) or in American terminology, zoning laws (Village of Euclid v. Ambler Realty Company (1926) 272 U.S. 365). The give and take of civil society frequently requires that the exercise of private rights should be restricted in the general public interest. The principles which underlie the right of the individual not to be deprived of his property without compensation are, first, that some public interest is necessary to justify the taking of private property for the benefit of the state and, secondly, that when the public interest does so require, the loss should not fall upon the individual whose property has been taken but should be borne by the public as a whole. But these principles do not require the payment of compensation to anyone whose private rights are restricted by legislation of general application which is enacted for the public benefit. This is so even if, as will inevitably be the case, the legislation in general terms affects some people more than others. For example, rent control legislation restricts only the rights of those who happen to be landlords but nevertheless falls within the general principle that compensation will not be payable.

28. [...] It affected Grape Bay more than others because they were actually engaged in negotiations with a view to setting up a McDonald’s restaurant. But there was no existing business of which they were deprived, as in the Manitoba Fisheries case. Still less was there, as in that case, what amounted in substance to an acquisition of that business by a public authority. And in the present case, unlike the cases on planning control or landmark preservation orders, Grape Bay did not even own land affected by the restriction. It merely had an option to take a lease.

[...]

30. [His Lordship recalled that in Penn Central Transportation Co. v. City of New York (1978) 438 U.S. 104, Brennan J said the following]: ‘‘Taking’ jurisprudence does not divide a single parcel into discrete segments and attempt to determine whether rights in a particular segment have been entirely abrogated. In deciding whether a particular governmental action has effected a taking, this Court focuses rather both on the character of the action and on the nature and extent of the interference with the rights in the parcel as a whole ...’

32. [...] Mr. Diel said that, as a judge of the local court, Meerabux J. was better placed to know what was in the interests of Bermuda than their Lordships in London. They should not therefore interfere with his assessment unless it was plainly wrong.

33. Their Lordships would accept that Bermudians are in the best position to know what the public interest of Bermuda requires. But the Constitution lays down a separation of powers between the executive, legislature and judiciary. On a matter such as the desirability or otherwise of franchise restaurants, which is a pure question of policy, raising no issue of human rights or fundamental principle, the decision-making power has been entrusted to those Bermudians who constitute the legislative branch of government and not to the judges... feelings about what gives a community its identity are powerful and important. The issues which they raise are pre-eminently matters for democratic decision by the elected branch of government. The members of the legislature are not required to explain themselves to the judiciary or persuade them that their view of the public interest is the correct one.

== See also ==
- English land law
- UK administrative law
- Claim rights and liberty rights
