= Cedar Point Nursery v. Hassid =

- Supreme Court of the United States

Argued March 22, 2021 Decided June 23, 2021
- Full case name: Cedar Point Nursery and Fowler Packing Company, Inc. v. Victoria Hassid, et al.
- Docket no.: 20-107
- Citations: 594 U.S. 139 (more)
- Argument: Oral argument

Holding
- The California Agricultural Labor Relations Act of 1975, which grants labor organizations an uncompensated "right to take access" to an agricultural employer’s property in order to solicit support for unionization, effects a per se physical taking under the Fifth Amendment.

Court membership
- Chief Justice John Roberts Associate Justices Clarence Thomas · Stephen Breyer; Samuel Alito · Sonia Sotomayor; Elena Kagan · Neil Gorsuch; Brett Kavanaugh · Amy Coney Barrett

Case opinions
- Majority: Roberts, joined by Thomas, Alito, Gorsuch, Kavanaugh, Barrett
- Concurrence: Kavanaugh
- Dissent: Breyer, joined by Sotomayor, Kagan

Laws applied
- U.S. Const. amend. V

Cedar Point Nursery v. Hassid, 594 U.S. 139 (2021), was a United States Supreme Court case involving eminent domain and labor relations. In its decision, the Court held that a regulation made pursuant to the California Agricultural Labor Relations Act that required agricultural employers to allow labor organizers to regularly access their property for the purposes of union recruitment constituted a per se taking under the Fifth Amendment. Consequently, the regulation may not be enforced unless “just compensation” is provided to the employers.

== Background ==
In 1975, California's legislature passed the California Agricultural Labor Relations Act to help unions gain access to agriculture workers in the state, which at that time tended to be migratory with the seasons and difficult to contact otherwise. The Act allowed union members, with prior notice to the state's Agricultural Labor Relations Board but without consent of the property owner, to come onto agricultural properties up to three times a day, one hour at a time, up to 120 days during a year, to perform unionization activities.

The dispute arose out of a 2015 effort by agricultural union organizers to persuade workers at a Dorris, California strawberry nursery and at a Central Valley fruit packing operation to join a collective bargaining organization. The visit to the northern California farm was conducted under the 1975 Act. The nursery owner sued for a declaratory judgment and an injunction barring future visits by labor organizers, arguing that the regulation results in a physical taking of property and an unreasonable seizure under the U.S. Constitution.

Both the U.S. District Court for the Northern District of California and the U.S. Court of Appeals for the Ninth Circuit rejected the request for an injunction and the nursery's and fruit packer's arguments that state authorization of union organizer visits under the state regulation is a taking of property or an unreasonable seizure. The 2-1 opinion by the appeals court was written by Judge Richard Paez and joined by Judge William A. Fletcher. Judge Edward Leavy dissented. Judge Sandra Segal Ikuta wrote a dissent from the denial of rehearing en banc that was joined by 7 other judges.

The California Supreme Court had previously rejected constitutional attacks on the regulation in 1976.

== Supreme Court ==
Certiorari was granted in the case on November 13, 2020. Amicus curiae briefs were filed by multiple organizations, including Pelican Institute for Public Policy, Cato Institute, Americans for Prosperity Foundation, New England Legal Foundation, California Farm Bureau Federation, Western Growers Association, California Fresh Fruit Association, Mountain States Legal Foundation, Institute for Justice, Chamber of Commerce of the United States, and Buckeye Institute for the petitioner. A coalition of states led by Oklahoma also filed an amicus brief on the petitioners' side. Amici for the respondent included National Employment Law Project, United Food & Commercial Workers Western States Council, Teamsters Joint Council 7, Constitutional Accountability Center, AFL–CIO, Service Employees International Union, United Farm Workers of America, California Rural Legal Assistance, Inc., and International Lawyers Assisting Workers Network. A coalition of states led by Virginia also filed an amicus brief supporting the respondent. Several U.S. senators and a group of local governments also filed amicus briefs in support of the petitioner.

The United States filed an amicus brief in support of petitioners on January 7, 2021, 13 days before the end of the Trump administration. On February 12, 2021, acting solicitor general Elizabeth Prelogar notified the Supreme Court that the Biden administration had changed the government's position and urged affirmance of the lower court decision.

The basic issue before the justices was whether the union organizer visits to the petitioners' facilities is a physical taking of property and therefore automatically subject to an injunction or mandatory compensation under the 1982 case of Loretto v. Teleprompter Manhattan CATV Corp. or, instead, whether the petitioners' claim should be evaluated under the various factors outlined in the 1978 case of Penn Central Transportation Co. v. New York City.

The Supreme Court heard oral arguments on March 22, 2021. Cedar Point Nursery and Fowler Packing Co. were represented by the Pacific Legal Foundation.

The Court issued its decision on June 23, 2021. In a 6–3 decision, the Court reversed the Ninth Circuit decision and remanded the case back for further review. The majority opinion was written by Chief Justice John Roberts and joined by Justices Clarence Thomas, Samuel Alito, Neil Gorsuch, Brett Kavanaugh, and Amy Coney Barrett. Kavanaugh also wrote a concurring opinion. Roberts wrote "The access regulation amounts to simple appropriation of private property" and that "access regulation grants labor organizations a right to invade the growers' property. It therefore constitutes a per se physical taking" without compensation. Roberts stated that this would not affect functions like government inspectors as those are beneficial to both employees and the public.

Justice Stephen Breyer wrote the dissenting opinion, joined by Justices Sonia Sotomayor and Elena Kagan. Breyer wrote that the access granted to union organizers was only temporary and not permanent and thus should not be considered a taking, since the agricultural worked are not "forever denied" use of the property, and thus the law was "not functionally equivalent to the classic taking in which government directly appropriates private property or ousts the owner from his domain". Breyer also expressed concern that the majority opinion may be used broadly by landowner to block access from inspectors such as those "to verify proper preservation of wetlands or the habitat enjoyed by an endangered species, or for that matter, the safety of inspected meat".
