= Charlotte Rumbold =

Charlotte Rumbold (1869–1960) was active in urban planning in St. Louis, Missouri, and Cleveland, Ohio.

== Personal life ==
Rumbold was born in Belleville, Illinois, on December 28, 1869, to Thomas Frazier and Charlotte Rumbold. She graduated from Columbia University and studied social work in Europe.

She died on July 2, 1960. She was a Catholic.

== In St. Louis ==
Rumbold was superintendent of playgrounds and recreation in St. Louis from 1906 to 1913.

== In Cleveland ==
In 1916, she came to Cleveland to do a survey on commercial recreation, and she then worked for the Cleveland Chamber of Commerce until her retirement. After 1919, she was president, secretary, treasurer, and statehouse lobbyist for the Ohio Planning Conference, which was founded in 1919. In 1933, as secretary of Cleveland Homes, Inc., she secured funds for the Cedar-Central Project in Cleveland.
