= Ohio Planning Conference =

The Ohio Planning Conference (OPC) is an association of citizens and planners that promotes city and regional planning in the state of Ohio. OPC is a chapter of the American Planning Association (APA) and is APA's second-oldest chapter.

In 2010, the group changed its name to APA Ohio.

OPC was founded in October 1919 in Cleveland, Ohio for the "interchange of ideas upon, and to promote the cause of, city, town and regional planning in the State of Ohio" as the Ohio State Conference on City Planning. Among OPC's founders and its second president was Alfred Bettman, a Cincinnati, Ohio-based attorney who later wrote the amicus curiae brief in Village of Euclid, Ohio v. Ambler Realty Co., a 1926 United States Supreme Court decision that paved the way for the use of zoning throughout the U.S. OPC provided Bettman the seed money to file the brief.

A second notable early leader and president of the organization was Ernest J. Bohn, a pioneer in public housing in the Cleveland area. Both Mr. Bettman and Mr. Bohn, along with another founder, Charlotte Rumbold, have been recognized through APA's national planning pioneer program. In light of OPC's legacy as the first statewide association of citizens and planners, APA recognized the founding of OPC as one of 88 national planning landmarks

OPC publishes a bimonthly newsletter, The Ohio Planners News, and conducts an annual statewide conference as well as other educational and training activities. In addition to the state organization, OPC has six regional sections: Akron, Central Ohio, Cleveland, Greater Cincinnati, Miami Valley, and Northwest Ohio.
