= Hadacheck v. Sebastian =

- Supreme Court of the United States

Argued October 22, 1915 Decided December 20, 1915
- Full case name: Hadacheck v. Sebastian, Chief of Police of the City of Los Angeles
- Citations: 239 U.S. 394 (more) 36 S.Ct. 143; 60 L. Ed. 348; 1915 U.S. LEXIS 1430

Case history
- Prior: Writ of habeas corpus discharged, Ex parte Hadacheck, 165 Cal. 416, 132 P. 584 (1913); affirmed, Hadacheck v. Alexander, 169 Cal. 616, 147 P. 259 (1915).

Holding
- An ordinance of Los Angeles prohibiting the manufacturing of bricks within specified limits of the city was a legitimate exercise of the police power.

Court membership
- Chief Justice Edward D. White Associate Justices Joseph McKenna · Oliver W. Holmes Jr. William R. Day · Charles E. Hughes; Willis Van Devanter · Joseph R. Lamar; Mahlon Pitney · James C. McReynolds

Case opinion
- Majority: McKenna, joined by unanimous

Hadacheck v. Sebastian, 239 U.S. 394 (1915), was an early U.S. Supreme Court case on the constitutionality of zoning ordinances. The Court held that an ordinance of Los Angeles, California, prohibiting the manufacturing of bricks within specified limits of the city did not unconstitutionally deprive the petitioner of his property without due process of law, or deny him equal protection of the laws.

== History ==
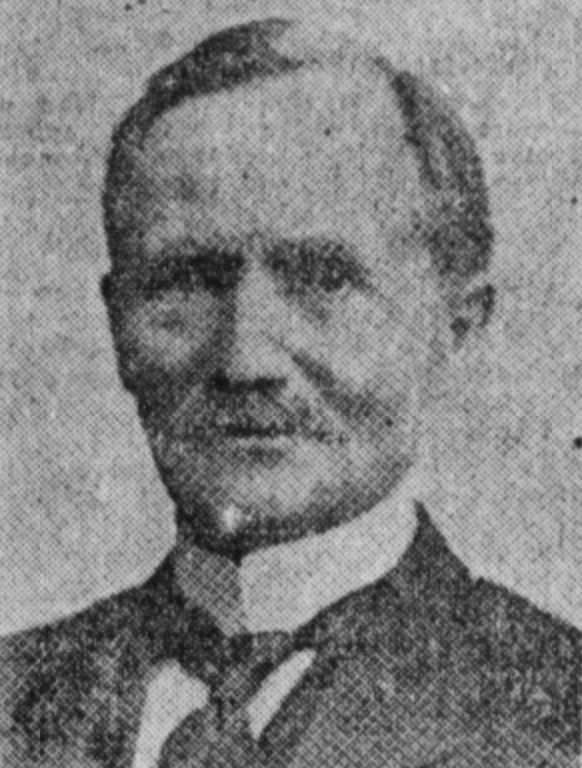
Josias J. Andrews, the Councilman who introduced the motion to eliminate all brickyards in Victoria Park, in 1909.

Los Angeles City Councilman Josias J. (Jerry) Andrews, one of the owners of the Victoria Park tract, moved the City Council to eliminate all brickyards in an area bounded by Wilshire Boulevard on the north, Western Avenue on the east, Washington Street on the south and the city limits on the west. That ordinance would effectively put two brickyards out of business, one of them just a few blocks west of Victoria Park, between Crenshaw Boulevard and Woolsey Avenue (today's Bronson Avenue) on Pico Street.

The Los Angeles Times said that the brickyard "happens to be in a district where Andrews now has large real estate investments. . . . The ordinance was calculated to drive out of business a brickyard facing Victoria Park." The Times opined that the purpose of the law was "to free that ornate neighborhood [Victoria Park] of the unsightly and unesthetic brickyards. Andrews admitted a 'small' interest in the tract but vehemently declared [that] his private interests could have no influence on his duty to the people who are oppressed by the brickyards that were there before real estate agents developed new tracts.

The city law was approved by the council, vetoed by Mayor George Alexander and passed over the mayor's veto. Because of the new law, the owner of one of the yards, J.C. Hadacheck, was convicted of a misdemeanor for the violation of a city ordinance, which prohibited the establishment or operation a brickyard or brick kiln, or any manufacture or burning of brick within described limits in the city. Hadacheck was taken into custody by Los Angeles Chief of Police Charles E. Sebastian, whereupon he filed a petition for habeas corpus with the California Supreme Court.

== California Supreme Court ==
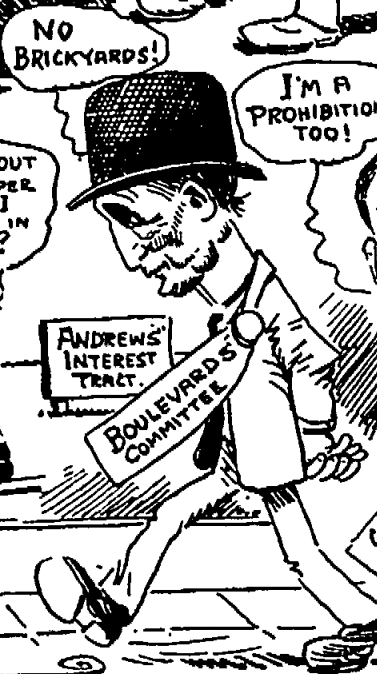
Los Angeles Times caricature of Josias J. Andrews with "Andrews Interest Tract" sign in background, 1910.

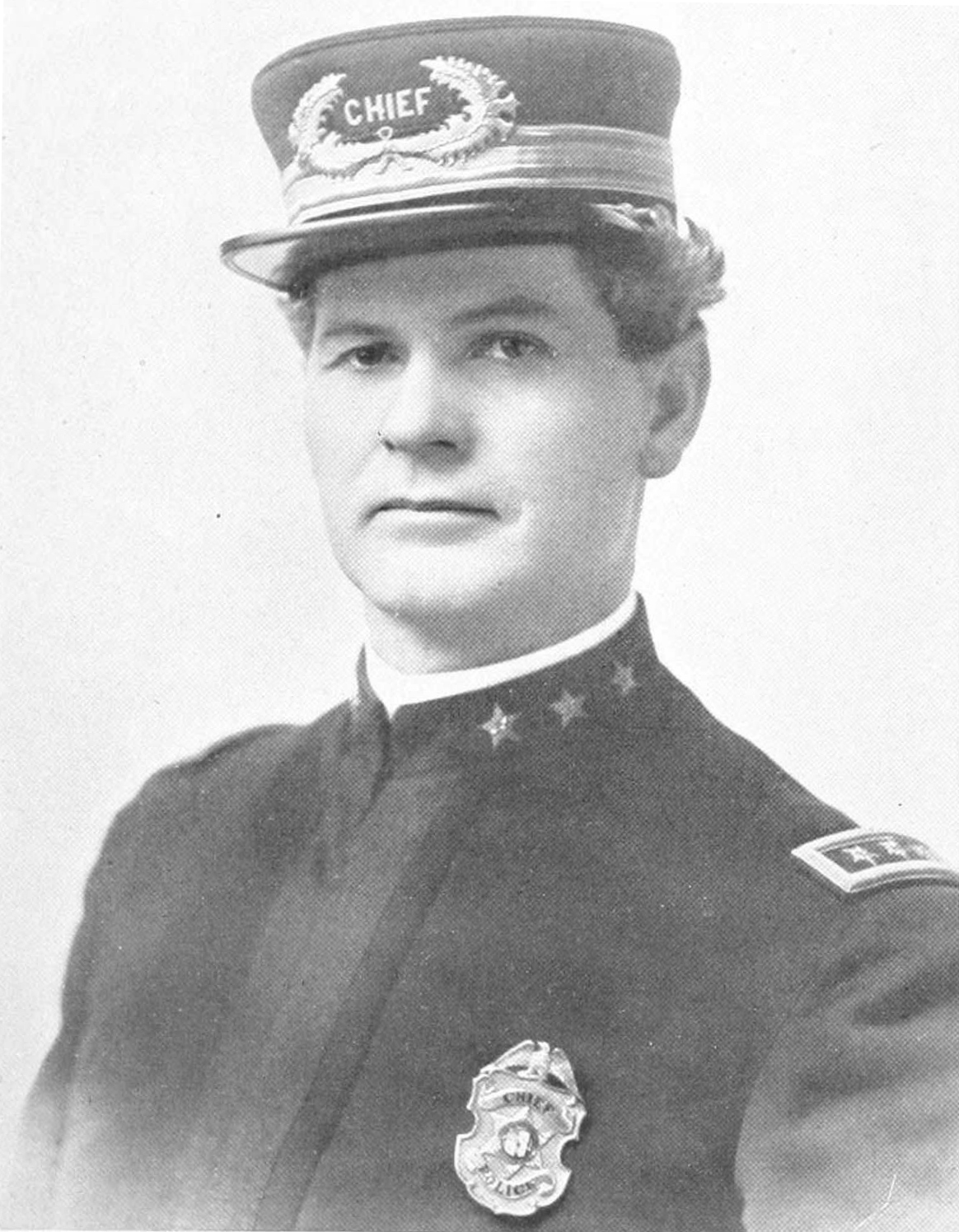
Police Chief Charles E. Sebastian c. 1911–1913.

In his petition to the court, Hadacheck (who had acquired his property prior to his district's annexation by the city of Los Angeles) set forth at length his grievances with the ordinance and the decision of the lower court, including among other things that his land contained valuable deposits of clay which were ideal for making bricks, that his land was quite valuable and that he acquired this particular tract for the express purpose of manufacturing bricks, that the ordinance would deprive him of his use of the property and force him to abandon his business, that his business was conducted in such a manner as to emit as little pollution as possible and could not be considered a nuisance under the California Civil Code, and that the district described by the ordinance was drawn in such a manner solely to disrupt his business. Hadacheck further alleged an unconstitutional taking by the city, and that the ordinance violated both the California Constitution and the Fourteenth Amendment to the United States Constitution.

The California Supreme Court found in favor of the city, accepting the judgment of the legislators. The court held that the business was one which could be lawfully regulated, and the fact that the petitioner began his business prior to the enactment of the ordinance was no defense. The court also discussed the affidavits submitted by interested parties which contradicted Hadacheck's assertions that the business was conducted in a sanitary, non-polluting manner.

== U.S. Supreme Court decision ==
Justice McKenna, writing for a unanimous court, upheld the California Supreme Court's decision, holding that the ordinance was a legitimate use of the police power. He analogized this case to an earlier one, Reinman v. Little Rock, which dealt with a similar ordinance banning livery stables. Reinman was distinguishable on the grounds that a livery stable could be moved and operated anywhere, while bricks can only be manufactured where suitable clay is found. Hadacheck contended that the removal of clay from his land was not physically impossible, but was prohibitively expensive. The Court held that even though relocating the brick factory would be costly, the ordinance did not amount to a complete denial of the use of Hadacheck's property, because the ordinance did not completely deny Hadacheck the use of the clay on his land.

The Court further held that the ordinance did not violate the Equal Protection Clause of the Fourteenth Amendment. Hadacheck alleged that his business was prohibited while those of his competitors elsewhere were not. The Court responded that just because his business was the first to be shut down, it does not follow that others would not be in the future, thus this issue was beyond the scope of the case.

== Historical importance ==
Hadacheck v. Sebastian was one of the first cases to deal with the issue of regulatory takings under zoning laws, even though the ordinance in question was simple and primitive in comparison to modern American zoning schemes. Because of this, the case is commonly discussed in first year constitutional law and/or property law classes in American law schools.

== Notes and references ==
Access to some of the links may require the use of a library card.
