= Village of Euclid v. Ambler Realty Co. =

1926 United States Supreme Court case that permitted city zoning

Coordinates: 41.565711°N 81.5426°W

- Supreme Court of the United States

Argued January 27, 1926 Reargued October 12, 1926 Decided November 22, 1926
- Full case name: Village of Euclid, Ohio, et al. v. Ambler Realty Company
- Citations: 272 U.S. 365 (more) 47 S. Ct. 114; 71 L. Ed. 303; 1926 U.S. LEXIS 8; 4 Ohio L. Abs. 816; 54 A.L.R. 1016

Case history
- Prior: Appeal from the United States District Court for the Northern District of Ohio

Holding
- The Court held that the zoning ordinance was not an unreasonable extension of the village's police power and did not have the character of arbitrary fiat, and thus it was not unconstitutional.

Court membership
- Chief Justice William H. Taft Associate Justices Oliver W. Holmes Jr. · Willis Van Devanter; James C. McReynolds · Louis Brandeis; George Sutherland · Pierce Butler; Edward T. Sanford · Harlan F. Stone

Case opinions
- Majority: Sutherland, joined by Taft, Holmes, Brandeis, Sanford, Stone
- Dissent: Van Devanter, McReynolds, Butler

Laws applied
- U.S. Const. amend. XIV

Village of Euclid v. Ambler Realty Co., 272 U.S. 365 (1926), commonly known as Euclid v. Ambler, is a landmark decision of the Supreme Court of the United States in which the Court found that local ordinance-style zoning was a valid exercise of the police power. It was the first significant case regarding the relatively new practice of zoning, and bolstered zoning in the United States and influenced other countries.

== Facts ==
Ambler Realty owned 68 acres (0.28 km^{2}) of land in the village of Euclid, Ohio, a suburb of the industrial city of Cleveland. In an attempt to prevent Cleveland from subsuming the village and the growth of industry which might change its character, Euclid developed a zoning ordinance based upon six classes of use, three classes of height and four classes of area. The property in question was divided into three classes of use, as well as various height and area classes, thereby hindering Ambler Realty from developing the land for industry. Ambler Realty sued the village of Euclid, arguing that the zoning ordinance had substantially reduced the value of the land by limiting its use, amounting to a deprivation of Ambler's liberty and property without due process.

== Judgment ==
=== District Court ===
When initially heard by the US District Court for the Northern District of Ohio, Euclid moved to dismiss the complaint entirely, arguing that Ambler Realty had no right to sue in the first place without taking the issue before the Euclid Zoning Board, as required by the zoning ordinance. Euclid based their argument on a legal doctrine which has come to be known as the exhaustion of administrative remedies. The District Court denied this motion, finding that the zoning ordinance did in fact constitute an act of taking by Euclid of Ambler Realty's property, and that the ordinance was unconstitutional. The ordinance defined the use and size of buildings permissible in each district. Ambler Realty's land spanned multiple districts, and the company was therefore significantly restricted in the types of buildings it could construct on the land. Thus, there was no reason for the company to abide by the ordinance's requirement. Euclid's motion was denied and the lower court decided in favor of Ambler Realty. Prominent lawyer Newton D. Baker argued the case for Ambler Realty and James Metzenbaum represented Euclid.

=== Supreme Court ===
The Supreme Court agreed with the lower court's denial of the dismissal motion, but overturned the outcome of the case and sided with the Village of Euclid. The Court held that the zoning ordinance was not an unreasonable extension of the village's police power and did not have the character of arbitrary fiat, and thus it was not unconstitutional.

Further, the Court found that Ambler Realty had offered no evidence that the ordinance had any effect on the value of the property in question, but based their assertions of depreciation on speculation only. The Court ruled that speculation was not a valid basis for a claim of takings.

Ambler Realty had argued their case on the basis of the 14th Amendment's due process clause. The Court noted that the challenger in a due process case would have to show that the law in question is discriminatory and has no rational basis. The Court found that Euclid's zoning ordinance in fact did have a rational basis.

Planner and lawyer Alfred Bettman, supported by the Ohio Planning Conference (now APA-Ohio, a chapter of the American Planning Association), submitted an amicus brief on behalf of Euclid, arguing that zoning is a form of nuisance control and therefore a reasonable police power measure.

In short the Court ruled that zoning ordinances, regulations and laws must find their justification in some aspect of police power and asserted for the public welfare. Benefit for the public welfare must be determined in connection with the circumstances, the conditions and the locality of the case.

== Significance ==
=== Zoning precedent ===
At the time of Euclid v. Ambler, zoning was a relatively new concept, and indeed there had been rumblings that it was an unreasonable intrusion into private property rights for a government to restrict how an owner might use property. The Supreme Court, in holding that there was valid government interest in maintaining the character of a neighborhood and in regulating where certain land uses should occur, allowed for the subsequent explosion in zoning ordinances across the country. The Supreme Court has never heard a case seeking to overturn the decision. Today most local governments in the United States have zoning ordinances. Houston, Texas is the largest unzoned city in the United States, although it uses deed restrictions instead.

In 1928, less than two years later, the Supreme Court decided in Nectow v. City of Cambridge that a zoning ordinance had depreciated the value of the plaintiff's property, and overturned the ordinance for violating the 14th Amendment due process clause.

=== Euclid ===
The Ambler tract remained undeveloped for 20 years until General Motors built an aircraft plant there during World War II, and later a GM Fisher Body plant until the 1970s. On June 9, 2016, the City of Euclid and the Euclid Landmarks Commission dedicated an Ohio Historical Marker at the Euclid Police Mini-Station on HGR Industrial Surplus’ property at 20001 Euclid Avenue to formally recognize the site at the center of the U.S. Supreme Court case.

== Legacy ==
In recent years, restrictive zoning ordinances have been blamed for rising housing costs in American cities. Both progressive and conservative legal scholars have begun calling for Euclid v. Ambler to be overturned or severely limited under the Takings Clause of the Fifth Amendment.

== See also ==
- Grape Bay Ltd v Attorney-General of Bermuda [1999] UKPC 43
