= First English Evangelical Lutheran Church v. Los Angeles County =

- Supreme Court of the United States

Argued January 14, 1987 Decided June 9, 1987
- Full case name: First English Evangelical Lutheran Church of Glendale v. County of Los Angeles, California
- Citations: 482 U.S. 304 (more) 107 S. Ct. 2378; 96 L. Ed. 2d 250; 1987 U.S. LEXIS 2606; 55 U.S.L.W. 4781; 26 ERC (BNA) 1001; 17 ELR 20787
- Argument: Oral argument

Holding
- The complete destruction of the value of property constituted a taking under the Fifth Amendment even if that taking was temporary and the property was later restored.

Court membership
- Chief Justice William Rehnquist Associate Justices William J. Brennan Jr. · Byron White; Thurgood Marshall · Harry Blackmun; Lewis F. Powell Jr. · John P. Stevens; Sandra Day O'Connor · Antonin Scalia

Case opinions
- Majority: Rehnquist, joined by Brennan, White, Marshall, Powell, Scalia
- Dissent: Stevens, joined by Blackmun, O'Connor (parts I, III)

Laws applied
- U.S. Const. amends. V, XIV

First English Evangelical Lutheran Church v. Los Angeles County, 482 U.S. 304 (1987), was a 6–3 decision of the United States Supreme Court. The court held that the complete destruction of the value of property constituted a "taking" under the Fifth Amendment even if that taking was temporary and the property was later restored.

== Background ==
First English Evangelical Lutheran Church operated a retreat center for handicapped children on its property within the Angeles National Forest. They called the camp Lutherglen. After a serious flood destroyed all the buildings in Lutherglen, the County of Los Angeles adopted an interim ordinance prohibiting building within the floodplain.

The church sued seeking damages, alleging the ordinance denied them all use of Lutherglen. The Superior Court struck the allegation, reasoning that damages were unavailable for an inverse condemnation. In California a plaintiff was procedurally first required to get the court to declare a challenged regulation was excessive. After the regulation was declared excessive the regulator could discontinue the regulation or pay just compensation. The Court of Appeal affirmed the decision and the California Supreme Court denied review.

== Opinion of the court ==
The six-member majority reversed and remanded the case to be considered with the struck allegations reinstated. Writing for the court, Chief Justice William Rehnquist's logic turns on a concern that allowing a regulator to simply discontinue a regulation declared to be a taking creates a temporary taking for the period of time the challenged regulation was in force.

This temporary takings question had been in contention since the court had affirmed on other grounds the case establishing the California approach, Agins v. City of Tiburon. In the seven years since Agins, the court had heard three cases involving the California approach, all of which had been denied review by the California Supreme Court, only to dividedly affirm or dismiss on finality issues. This case had its own jurisdictional problems, not least of which that the plaintiff's less than clear pleadings had only invoked the California state constitution. Nevertheless, the court found itself ready and able to dispose of the temporary takings issue.

The court held that a temporary regulatory takings requires just compensation, as in any other kind of takings. In reaching his conclusion, Rehnquist relied heavily on WWII physical takings cases, where the government was required to pay compensation for property it had temporarily commandeered.

== Dissent ==
Justice John Paul Stevens, joined by Justices Harry Blackmun and Sandra Day O'Connor, dissented. After noting the "litigation explosion" the court's reasoning will cause, the dissent points out that even if the church's allegations are not struck, plaintiff's claim is so weak it will be summarily rejected regardless. They also point out that the severe floods in the floodplain may poise a greater obstacle to rebuilding Lutherglen than the county ordinance. Given that the church has such a weak case, the dissenters doubt the propriety of using struck complaint allegations as a "springboard" to address novel constitutional questions.

Writing alone, Stevens probes the distinction between physical and regulatory takings. Acknowledging as a matter of course that there can be temporary physical takings, he posits that the "three-dimensional" nature of regulations make them too uncertain to be treated the same as physical invasions. Stevens concludes by noting that procedural due process should be adequate to protect property owners from a malevolent local zoning board.

== See also ==
- Hosanna-Tabor Evangelical Lutheran Church & School v. Equal Employment Opportunity Commission
- List of United States Supreme Court cases, volume 482
