= Lucas v. South Carolina Coastal Council =

- Supreme Court of the United States

Argued March 2, 1992 Decided June 29, 1992
- Full case name: David H. Lucas, v. South Carolina Coastal Council
- Citations: 505 U.S. 1003 (more) 12 S. Ct. 2886; 120 L. Ed. 2d 798; 1992 U.S. LEXIS 4537; 60 U.S.L.W. 4842; 34 ERC (BNA) 1897; 92 Daily Journal DAR 9030; 22 ELR 21104; 6 Fla. L. Weekly Fed. S 715

Case history
- Prior: 304 S.C. 376, 404 S.E.2d 895 (1991); cert. granted, 502 U.S. 966 (1991).
- Subsequent: On remand at the South Carolina Supreme Court, 309 S.C. 424, 424 S.E.2d 484 (1992).

Holding
- A regulation that deprives an owner of all economically beneficial uses of land constitutes a taking unless the proscribed use interests were not part of the title to begin with. In other words, a law or decree with the effect of depriving all economically beneficial use must do no more than duplicate the result that could have been achieved in the courts under the law of nuisance.

Court membership
- Chief Justice William Rehnquist Associate Justices Byron White · Harry Blackmun; John P. Stevens · Sandra Day O'Connor; Antonin Scalia · Anthony Kennedy; David Souter · Clarence Thomas

Case opinions
- Majority: Scalia, joined by Rehnquist, White, O'Connor, Thomas
- Concurrence: Kennedy (in judgment)
- Dissent: Blackmun
- Dissent: Stevens
- Statement: Souter

Laws applied
- U.S. Const. amends. V, XIV

Lucas v. South Carolina Coastal Council, 505 U.S. 1003 (1992), was a case in which the Supreme Court of the United States established the "total takings" test for evaluating whether a particular regulatory action constitutes a regulatory taking that requires compensation.

== Background ==
Petitioner David H. Lucas owned two vacant oceanfront lots in the Beachwood East Subdivision of the Wild Dunes development on the Isle of Palms in Charleston County, South Carolina. South Carolina's Coastal Zone Management Act (1977) required owners of coast land in "critical areas" near beaches to obtain permits from Respondent South Carolina Coastal Council before committing the land to new uses. The Beachfront Management Act, passed two years after Lucas's purchase of the lots, effectively prevented Petitioner Lucas from erecting homes on properties due to the effects it would have on the public beach. Lucas argued that this constituted a regulatory taking and was not a valid exercise of the state's police power.

=== Lower courts ===
Lucas filed suit asserting that the restrictions on the use of his lots was a taking of his property without just compensation. The lower court agreed and awarded Lucas $1,232,387.50 as just compensation for the regulatory taking. The government of South Carolina appealed, and the Supreme Court of South Carolina reversed.

== At the Supreme Court ==
=== Opinion of the Court ===
In a majority opinion by Justice Antonin Scalia, the Court found that the South Carolina Supreme Court erred in holding that the Beachfront Management Act was a valid exercise of the police power and did not constitute a taking.

The majority found that: (1) Deprivation of all economically beneficial use is, from the perspective of a property owner, deprivation of the property itself. (2) When all economically beneficial use is restricted, it is difficult to assume that the legislature is simply "adjusting" economical benefits and burdens. (3) Regulations that restrict all economically beneficial use may often be a guise of pressing that land into public service. (4) Lucas's lands have been deprived of all economically beneficial use. (5) There is no way to distinguish regulation that "prevents a harmful use" and confers benefits on nearby property. (6) Contrary to Respondent South Carolina's assertion, title is not held subject to the limitation that the state may regulate away all the property's economically beneficial use.

=== Concurrence ===
Justice Kennedy concurred in the judgement, finding that the determination of no value must be considered with reference to the owner's reasonable, investment-backed expectations. Justice Kennedy also expressed concern with the idea that state regulation could go no further than duplicating the common law of nuisance without exposing itself to the challenge of categorical taking, as some fragile lands might prevent such public concern that the state can go further in regulating development than the common law of nuisance might otherwise permit.

=== Dissents ===
Justice Blackmun dissented and argued that the court should not have granted certiorari to hear this case and it ignores its jurisdictional limits, remakes its traditional rules of review and created simultaneously a new categorical rule and an exception. There could never be a total loss because the owner can still enjoy other attributes of ownership such as right to exclude others, picnic, swim, camp in a tent or live on the property in a movable trailer. Additionally, state courts historically have been less likely to find that government action constituted a taking when the affected land is undeveloped. Neither is there a Common Law limit on the state's power to regulate harmful uses even to the point of destroying all economic value.

Justice Stevens also dissented and stated that the categorical rule created by the court is unsound and an unwise addition to the law of takings. In the past the court had worked at rejecting an absolute formula for determining a taking and have frequently in the past held a law that renders property valueless may not constitute a taking. The new rule created by the court is arbitrary because a landowner whose property is diminished in value 95% recovers nothing while an owner whose property is diminished 100% recovers the land's full value.

=== Statement ===
In an unusual filing, Justice Souter wrote a statement in which he neither joined the majority or dissented and said the case should be dismissed on procedural grounds. He wrote, "The case should have been dismissed as improperly granted, as the decision of the trial court that a total taking had occurred is highly questionable on the basis of the facts presented" because "The petition for review was granted on the assumption that the state [of South Carolina], by regulation, had deprived the owner of his entire economic interest in the subject property. Such was the state trial court's conclusion, which the state supreme court did not review."

== Aftermath ==
The case is known for establishing the modern "total takings" test.

On remand at the South Carolina Supreme Court, the court granted the parties leave to amend their pleadings to determine what the actual damages were.

After paying Lucas $850,000 in compensation for the two lots, South Carolina proceeded to sell the lots to private parties for development. A 5,000-square-foot private home now sits on one lot, while the other remains undeveloped.

== See also ==
- List of United States Supreme Court cases, volume 505
- List of United States Supreme Court cases
- Lists of United States Supreme Court cases by volume
- List of United States Supreme Court cases by the Rehnquist Court
- Grape Bay Ltd v Attorney-General of Bermuda
- English land law
- South African land law
