= Andrus v. Allard =

- Supreme Court of the United States

Decided November 27, 1979
- Full case name: Andrus v. Allard
- Citations: 444 U.S. 51 (more)

Holding
- A ban on the sale of a commodity already in a commercial inventory is not a taking when there is no requirement to surrender the commodity to the government.

Court membership
- Chief Justice Warren E. Burger Associate Justices William J. Brennan Jr. · Potter Stewart; Byron White · Thurgood Marshall; Harry Blackmun · Lewis F. Powell Jr. William Rehnquist · John P. Stevens

Case opinion
- Majority: Brennan, joined by unanimous

Laws applied
- Takings Clause, Eagle Protection Act

Andrus v. Allard, 444 U.S. 51 (1979), was a United States Supreme Court case in which the Court held that a ban on the sale of a commodity already in a commercial inventory is not a taking when there is no requirement to surrender the commodity to the government.
