= Penn Central Transportation Co. v. New York City =

- Supreme Court of the United States

Argued April 17, 1978 Decided June 26, 1978
- Full case name: Penn Central Transportation Company, et al. v. New York City, et al.
- Citations: 438 U.S. 104 (more) 98 S. Ct. 2646; 57 L. Ed. 2d 631; 1978 U.S. LEXIS 39; 11 ERC (BNA) 1801; 8 ELR 20528

Case history
- Prior: Appeal from the Court of Appeals of New York

Holding
- Whether a regulatory action that diminishes the value of a claimant's property constitutes a "taking" of that property depends on several factors, including the economic impact of the regulation on the claimant, particularly the extent to which the regulation has interfered with distinct investment-backed expectations, as well as the character of the governmental action.

Court membership
- Chief Justice Warren E. Burger Associate Justices William J. Brennan Jr. · Potter Stewart; Byron White · Thurgood Marshall; Harry Blackmun · Lewis F. Powell Jr. William Rehnquist · John P. Stevens

Case opinions
- Majority: Brennan, joined by Stewart, White, Marshall, Blackmun, Powell
- Dissent: Rehnquist, joined by Burger, Stevens

Laws applied
- U.S. Const. amend. V

Penn Central Transportation Co. v. New York City, 438 U.S. 104 (1978), is a landmark United States Supreme Court decision on compensation for regulatory takings. Penn Central sued the government of New York City after the New York City Landmark Preservation Commission denied its bid to build a large office building on top of Grand Central Terminal. The Supreme Court ruled in the city's favor.

== Events leading up to the case ==
=== New York City Landmarks Law ===
The New York City Landmarks Law was signed into effect by Mayor Robert F. Wagner, Jr., in 1965. This law was passed after New York citizens grew concerned over the loss of culturally significant structures such as Pennsylvania Station, demolished in 1963. The Landmarks Law's purpose is to protect structures that are significant to the city and still retain their ability to be properly used. This law is enforced by the New York City Landmarks Preservation Commission.

=== Railroad decline ===
Use of railroad systems saw its peak in the 1920s and began to falter in the mid-to-late 1930s. World War II revitalized use of the railroad systems in the early 1940s and brought the industry back to prior success. While this period saw nearly half of Americans using the railroad systems, by the late 1940s, there was once again a steep decline in railroad use. That put many of the railroad companies out of business and left others to find new ways to increase revenue.

The New York Central Railroad, owner of Grand Central Terminal in New York City, found itself facing bankruptcy in 1967 because of continued decline in railroad use. The Pennsylvania Railroad found itself in a similar position, and in 1968, the New York Central Railroad merged with the Pennsylvania Railroad to create the Penn Central Railroad company. The newly formed Penn Central began to look into updating the uses of the Grand Central Terminal to increase revenue and save the company from financial straits.

=== Proposals to replace Grand Central Terminal ===
In 1954, the New York Central Railroad began to look at replacing Grand Central Terminal with Grand Central Tower, an office tower. Early designs by William Zeckendorf and I. M. Pei included an ambitious 80-story tower, the tallest in the world. None of the early designs ever made it past the sketch phase. In 1958, Erwin S. Wolfson created proposals to replace Grand Central Terminal's six-story office building just north of the Terminal. Erwin S. Wolfson developed the project in the early 1960s with the assistance of the architects Emery Roth and Sons, Walter Gropius and Pietro Belluschi. The Pan Am Building was completed in 1963 and bought Grand Central Terminal more time away from proposed reconstructions.

In mid-1968, the Penn Central Railroad unveiled two designs by Marcel Breuer, one of which would potentially be built atop Grand Central Terminal. The first design (Breuer I) was a 55-story tall office building to be constructed on top of Grand Central. That building was to be cantilevered above the existing structure allowing Grand Central to maintain its facade. The second design (Breuer II) called for the demolition of one of the sides of Grand Central in order to create a unified facade for a new 53-story office building. Both designs were submitted to the New York City Landmarks Preservation Commission after the structures met city zoning laws.

==== Landmarks Preservation Commission's rejections ====
Upon reviewing the submitted designs for Grand Central Terminal, the Landmarks Preservation Commission rejected the plans on September 20, 1968. Penn Central then filed for a Certificate of Appropriateness for both proposals but was again denied. The Landmarks Preservation Commission summarized their reason for rejecting both plans:

Breuer I

Breuer I which would have preserved the existing vertical facades of the present structure, received more sympathetic considerations [than Breuer II]. The Commission focused on the effect that the proposed tower would have on a desirable feature created by the present structure and its surroundings: the dramatic view of the Terminal from Park Avenue South.

Breuer II

To protect a Landmark, one does not tear it down. To perpetuate its architectural features, one does not strip them off.

[We have] no fixed rule against making additions to designated buildings – it all depends on how they are done. ... But to balance a 55-story office tower above a flamboyant Beaux-Arts facade seems nothing more than an aesthetic joke. Quite simply, the tower would overwhelm the Terminal by its sheer mass. The 'addition' would be four times as high as the existing structure and would reduce the Landmark itself to the status of a curiosity. Landmarks cannot be divorced from their settings – particularly when the setting is a dramatic and integral part of the original concept. The Terminal, in its setting, is a great example of urban design. Such examples are not so plentiful in New York City that we can afford to lose any of the few we have. And we must preserve them in a meaningful way – with alterations and additions of such character, scale, materials and mass as will protect, enhance and perpetuate the original design rather than overwhelm it.

The Landmarks Preservation Commission offered Penn Central the Transfer of Development Rights (TDRs) to allow them to sell the air space above Grand Central Terminal to other developers for their own use. Penn Central felt this was not enough to be considered just compensation for the loss of their land use.

== State case ==
=== Penn Central files suit ===
After the New York City Landmark Preservation Commission rejected Penn Central's proposals for construction of a high rise building atop Grand Central Terminal, Penn Central filed suit against the city, arguing that under the New York Historical Preservation Law, it was entitled to a reasonable return on the value of its property, whereas in the existing condition, Grand Central Terminal could not break even and because (a) as a regulated railroad it could not go out of business, and (b) it was in bankruptcy, it could not cease the deficit-causing operations, thus suffering a taking of its property, for which it was entitled to compensation. The trial court agreed.

In a novel opinion that revisited some of Henry George's ideas, it ruled that in New York, a property owner was entitled to a return only on that increment of the property's value that was created by private entrepreneurship, not on the entire property's value. The court then affirmed the Appellate Division but, unaccountably, also granted Penn Central the opportunity to try the facts that would have to underlie the newly minted Court of Appeals holding.

Since this would have been impossible (Chief Judge Breitel later, in an extrajudicial statement, likened it to a search for the Holy Grail), and since the Court of Appeals conceded that such a task presented "impenetrable densities" and would require Penn Central to separate the inseparable, Penn Central sought review by the U.S. Supreme Court on a different legal theory.

=== Supreme Court decision ===
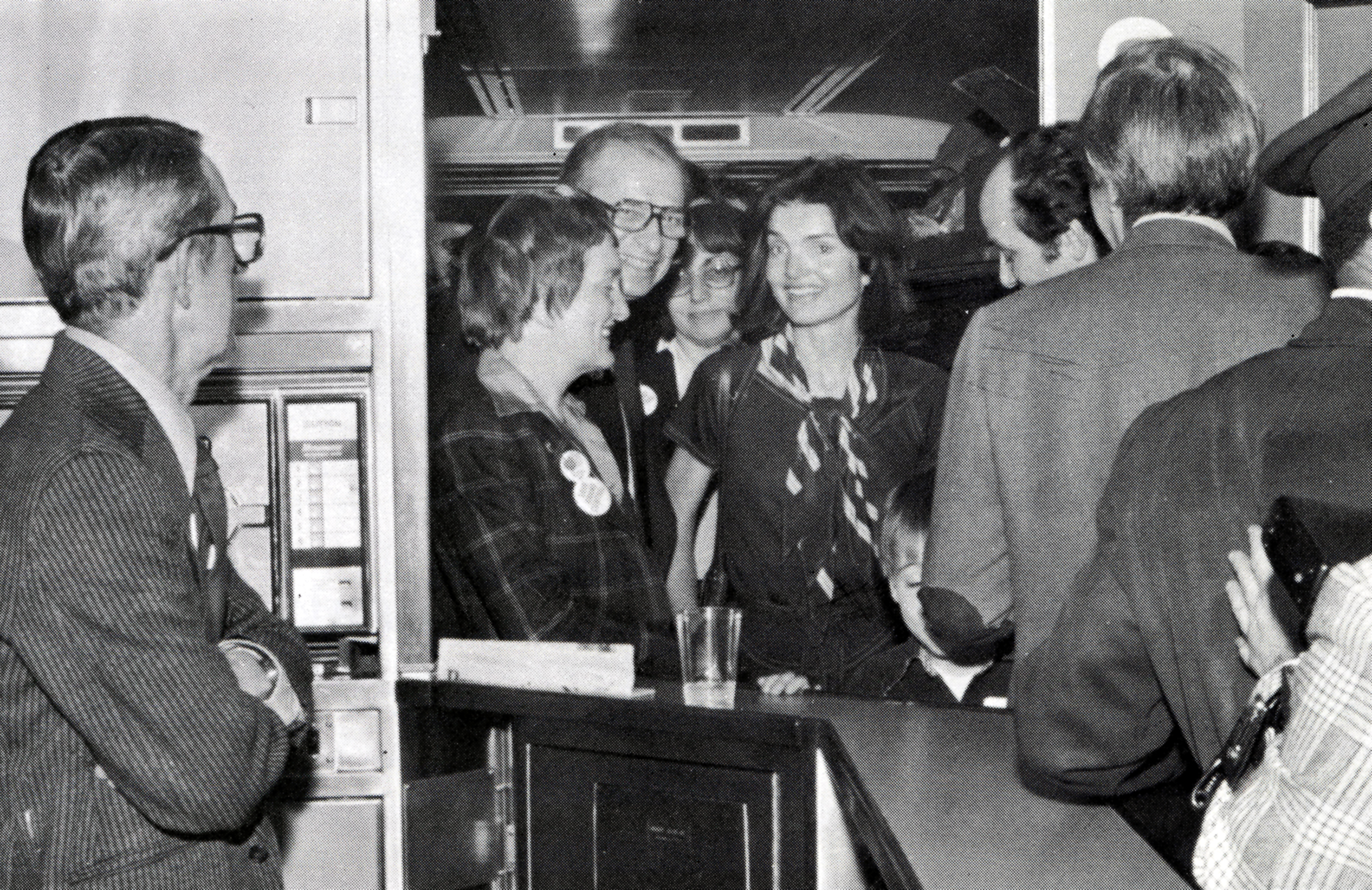
Jacqueline Kennedy Onassis (center) on board the Landmark Express, a special charter train by the Committee To Save Grand Central Terminal, on April 16, 1978. The group chartered the train to Washington D.C. for the day before oral arguments in the case.

In the United States Supreme Court, Penn Central changed theories. Instead of arguing that it was not receiving a reasonable return on its property because of the city regulations, it argued that the regulation took its air rights above Grand Central Terminal, which had been designed to accommodate a twenty-story building on top of it. The Supreme Court disagreed and held that under a new taking test that it formulated in this opinion, the economic impact on Penn Central was not severe enough to constitute a taking because Penn Central conceded that it could still continue with its present use whose return was reasonable. Thus, the regulation did not interfere with its reasonable investment-backed expectations. The court therefore found that the city's restrictions on Grand Central Terminal did not amount to a taking.

The case is perhaps best summarized in Section II-C of the Opinion of the Court.

Unlike the governmental acts in Goldblatt, Miller, Causby, Griggs, and Hadacheck, the New York City law does not interfere in any way with the present uses of the Terminal. Its designation as a landmark not only permits but contemplates that appellants may continue to use the property precisely as it has been used for the past 65 years: as a railroad terminal containing office space and concessions. So the law does not interfere with what must be regarded as Penn Central's reasonable expectation concerning the use of the parcel. More importantly, on this record, we must regard the New York City law as permitting Penn Central not only to profit from the Terminal but also to obtain a "reasonable return" on its investment.

— Associate Justice William J. Brennan, Jr.

The dissent argued that in this case there was a net transfer from Penn Central to the city. The dissent argued that it was not fair to have the entire burden of preserving Grand Central fall on its owners. That cost is the opportunity cost of not developing the airspace over the terminal.

=== Aftermath ===
Penn Central lost its trial, but was in bankruptcy by this time and lacked the funds to maintain Grand Central Terminal, which had fallen into disrepair. Eventually, the Metropolitan Transportation Authority restored it at public expense.

== See also ==
- List of United States Supreme Court cases, volume 438
- Grand Central Terminal
- Penn Central
- Tahoe-Sierra Preservation Council, Inc. v. Tahoe Regional Planning Agency (2002)

== Bibliography ==
- Levy, Robert A.; Mellor, William H. (2008). "Taking Property by Regulation". The Dirty Dozen: How Twelve Supreme Court Cases Radically Expanded Government and Eroded Freedom. New York: Sentinel. pp. 169–180. ISBN 978-1-59523-050-8.
- Gideon Kanner, Making Laws and Sausages: A Quarter-Century Retrospective on Penn Central Transportation Co. v. City of New York. 13 William & Mary Bill of Rights Journal 653 (2005)
- Schlichting, Kurt C. Grand Central Terminal: Railroads, Engineering, and Architecture in New York City. Baltimore, MD: JHU P, 2001.
- PENN CENTRAL TRANSP. CO. V. NEW YORK CITY. No. 438 U.S. 104. US Supreme Court. 26 June 1978.
- "Grand Central Station." Archiseek. 2007. The American Institute of Architects. 12 May 2008 <https://web.archive.org/web/20080724104921/http://usa.archiseek.com/newyork/newyork/grandcentralstation.html>.
- Duerksen, Christopher J. A Handbook on Historic Preservation Law. Baltimore, MD: Conservation Foundation, 1983. 351–376.
- Davis, Christina R. "About LPC." New York City Landmarks Preservation Commission. 2008. Government of New York City. 11 May 2008 <http://www.nyc.gov/html/lpc/html/about/about.shtml>.
- "Grand Central Terminal." New York Architecture Images. 10 May 2008 <http://www.nyc-architecture.com/MID/MID031.htm>.
- Kayden, Jerold S. "Celebrating Penn Central." Planning Magazine June 2003.
- Miller, Julia H. A Layperson's Guide to Historic Preservation Law. Washington D.C.: National Trust, 2000. 22–27.
- "Penn Central History." Penn Central Railroad Historical Society 4 April 2008. TainWeb.Com. 15 May 2008 <https://web.archive.org/web/20080604231315/http://www.pcrrhs.org/history.html>.
- Schlichting, Kurt C. Grand Central Terminal: Railroads, Engineering, and Architecture in New York City. Baltimore, MD: JHU P, 2001.
- "The MetLife Building." Tishman Speyer. 2008. 12 May 2008 <http://www.tishmanspeyer.com/properties/Property.aspx?id=57>.
- Weiss, Lois. "Air Rights Case Headed for Supreme Ct. Review - Transferable Development Rights for Grand Central Terminal, New York, New York." Real Estate Weekly 4 May 1994.
- Boyd, Lydia, and Lynn Pritcher. "Brief History of the U.S. Passenger Rail Industry." Duke University Libraries: Digital Collection. 25 January 2008. Duke University. 10 May 2008 <https://web.archive.org/web/20080501041925/http://library.duke.edu/digitalcollections/adaccess/rails-history.html>.
- Dukeminier, Jesse, James E. Krier, Gregory S. Alexander, & Michael H. Schill."Property" 6th ed. Aspen Publishers. New York: 2006.
