= California Proposition 20 =

California Proposition 20 may refer to:

- 1914 California Proposition 20 - Prize fights initiative
- 1922 California Proposition 20 - Approved Osteopathic Initiatives Act
- 1972 California Proposition 20 - Established the California Coastal Commission
- 2010 California Proposition 20 - Approved Congressional Redistricting Initiative
- 2020 California Proposition 20 - Rejected initiative regarding non-violent felonies
