= Big Sur land use =

== Location ==
The policies protecting land used in Big Sur are some of the most restrictive local-use standards in California, and are widely regarded as one of the most restrictive development protections anywhere. The program protects viewsheds from the highway and many vantage points, and severely restricts the density of development. About 60% of the coastal region is owned by governmental or private agencies which do not allow any development. The majority of the interior region is part of the Los Padres National Forest, Ventana Wilderness, Silver Peak Wilderness or Fort Hunter Liggett. The area is protected by the Big Sur Local Coastal Plan, which preserves it as "open space, a small residential community, and agricultural ranching." Its intention is "preserving the environment and visual access to it, the policies of the local coastal plan are to minimize, or limit, all destination activities."

The unincorporated region encompassing Big Sur does not have specific boundaries, but is generally considered to include the 71-mile (114 km) segment of California State Route 1 between Malpaso Creek near Carmel Highlands in the north and San Carpóforo Creek near San Simeon in the south, as well as the entire Santa Lucia range between these creeks. The interior region is mostly uninhabited, while the coast remains relatively isolated and sparsely populated, with between 1,800 and 2,000 year-round residents and relatively few visitor accommodations scattered among four small settlements.

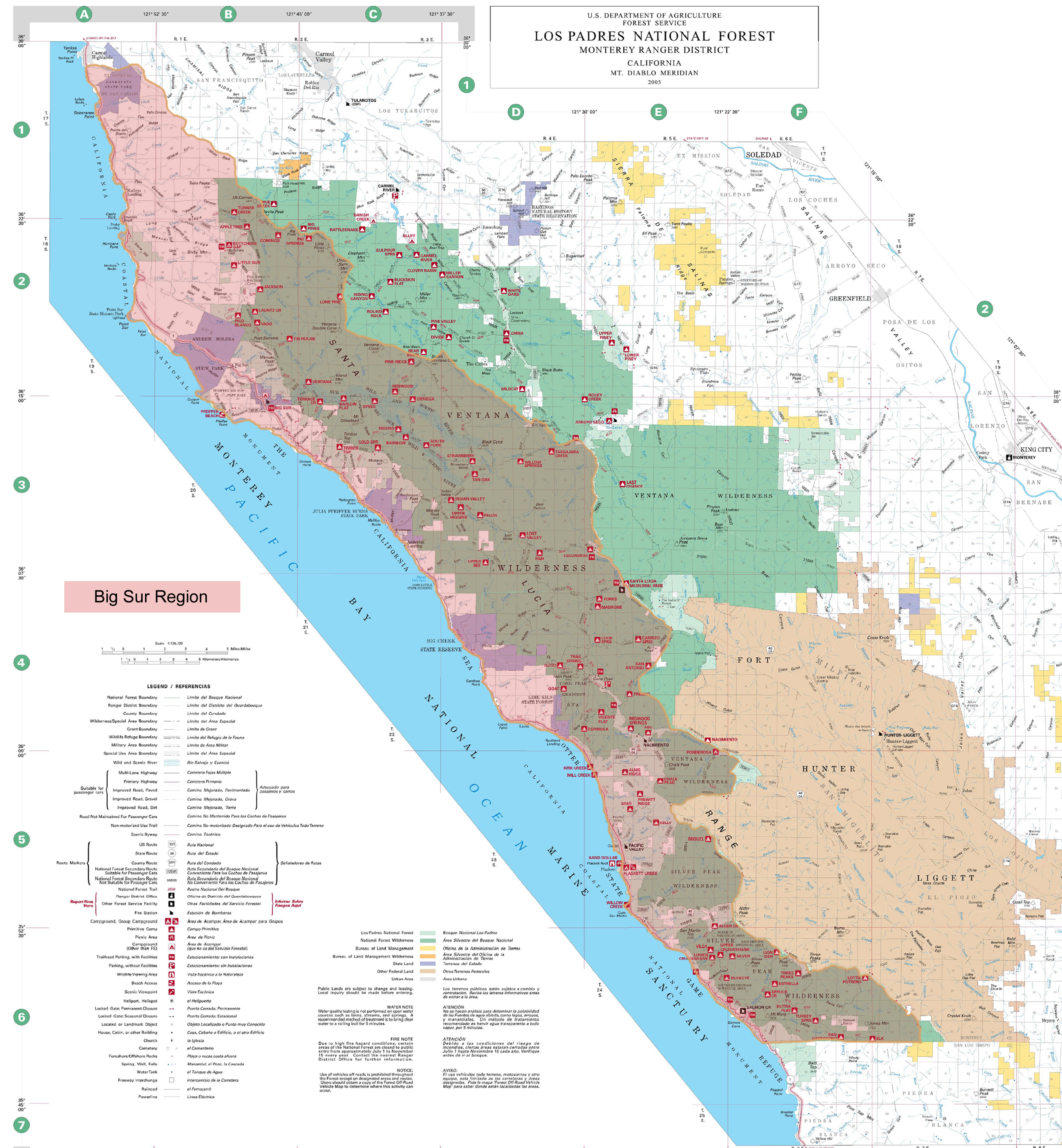
Approximate boundaries of the Big Sur region subject to Big Sur Local Coastal Plan.

== Early protections ==
Monterey County gained national attention for its early conservation efforts. The Monterey County Planning Commission passed a zoning ordinance in 1931, seven years before the road was completed, that banned billboards along the highway. A gas station owner on the highway 15 miles (24 km) south of Monterey went to court over the ordinance in 1936. Monterey County Superior Court Judge Maurice Dooling ruled for the county in 1941. Another ordinance enjoining specific kinds of off-premises signs was passed in 1955. It was challenged by the National Advertising Co. in a case that eventually went before the California Supreme Court. It affirmed in 1962 the county's right to ban billboards and other signs and advertising along Highway 1. The case secured to local government the right to use its police power for aesthetic purposes.

== Master plan ==
The first master plan for the Big Sur coast was written beginning in 1959 and completed in 1962. Monterey county involved local residents and consultants to develop the master plan. The Monterey County Coast Master Plan was recognized as an innovative and far reaching plan and was supported by the coast residents. Nationally recognized architect and part-time local resident Nathaniel A. Owings helped write the plan.

=== Big Sur Local Coastal Plan ===
When voters passed Proposition 20, the California Coastal Conservation Initiative in 1972, it established the California Coastal Commission. At the same time, Congress passed the Coastal Zone Management Act which the California Coastal Commission was put in charge of administering. To implement terms of the California proposition, the county began working on a comprehensive plan and in 1977 they appointed a small group of local Big Sur residents to the Big Sur Citizens' Advisory Committee. The committee sought to develop a plan that would conserve scenic views and the unparalleled beauty of the area. Committee members met with Big Sur residents, county administrators, and California Coastal Commission staff to write a new land use plan. The planning effort included several months of public hearings and discussion, including considerable input from the residents of Big Sur. The county solicited input with virtually every agency with an important role on the coast. The years-long debate bitterly divided the 1,400 residents of Big Sur.

The resulting Big Sur Local Coastal Plan (LCP) provides detailed policy guidance that attempts to balance the development needs of the land and home owners and the local community while protecting local resources. The local land use plan was initially approved by the Monterey County Board of Supervisors in 1981, but was rejected by the California Coastal Commission, which wanted closer obedience to the Coastal Act priorities. They approved the amended plan on April 10, 1986.

When the policy was finalized, Monterey County Supervisor Karin Strasser Kauffman said, "What this means is that when you look around you 100 years from now, Big Sur will be essentially unchanged from the way it looks today."

==== Key policies ====
The plan bans all development west of Highway 1 with the exception of the Big Sur Valley. It also restricts any development that can be seen from the highway and key vantage points including beaches, parks, campgrounds, and major trails, with a few exceptions. The plan states the following goals:

To preserve for posterity the incomparable beauty of the Big Sur country, its special cultural and natural resources, its landforms and seascapes and inspirational vistas. To this end, all development must harmonize with and be subordinate to the wild and natural character of the land.

Recognizing the Big Sur coast's outstanding scenic beauty and its great benefit to the people of the State and the Nation, it is the County's objective to preserve these scenic resources in perpetuity and to promote, wherever possible, the restoration of the natural beauty of visually degraded areas.

The county's basic policy is to prohibit all future public or private development visible from Highway 1 and major public viewing areas.

The restrictions also protect views from the Old Coast Road.

==== Restrictions ====
The provision of the Big Sur Local Coastal Plan that generated the most controversy set density requirements for future building. In areas west of Highway 1, any subdivision of an existing parcels must be at least 40 acres (16 ha). For parcels east of Highway 1, the plan limited parcel size based on slope. Most land is limited to a minimum subdivision of 320 acres (130 ha), although parcels with minimal slope may be subdivided to 40 acres (16 ha). Based on these rules, a coastal commission staff person calculated that only about 12 new parcels could be subdivided within the entire 234 square miles (610 km^{2}) Big Sur coastal planning area.

The plan bans large hotels, condominium projects, and similar major developments. It allows construction of about 300 more visitor's rooms, but only in clusters of 30 or fewer units in four rural communities — Big Sur Valley, Lucia, Pacific Valley, and Gorda.

For dwellings, the limit in tourist areas is one living unit per acre. West of Highway 1, density is limited to one unit per 2.5 acres (1.0 ha), and east of the highway to one unit per 5 acres (2.0 ha). In established communities like Palo Colorado Canyon and the Big Sur Valley, only one living unit per 2.5 acres (1.0 ha) is permitted. South of Big Sur Valley, the limit is set to one unit per 5 acres (2.0 ha), and in the far south of the region, only one unit per 10 acres (4.0 ha) is allowed.

The plan states that region is to be preserved as "open space, a small residential community, and agricultural ranching." The plan was approved in 1981 and is one of the most restrictive local use programs in the state, and is widely regarded as one of the most restrictive documents of its kind anywhere.

==== Opposition to restrictions ====
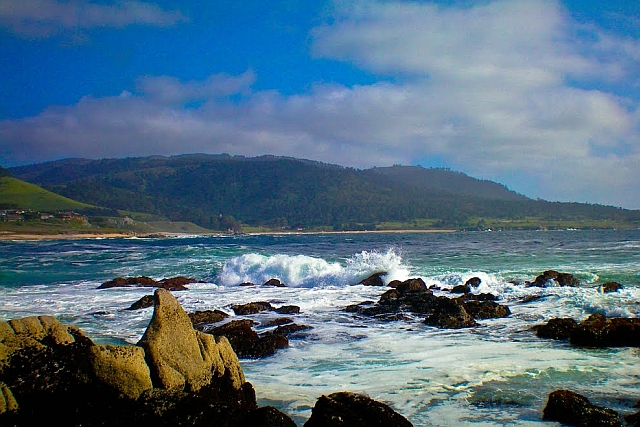
Looking south from Carmel River mouth toward the Point Lobos Ranch and the Santa Lucia Mountains

John Harlan, a fourth-generation Big Sur resident whose family owns large amounts of land in the region, criticized the plan when it was under consideration. He said "flatlanders who live 90 miles from where I sit" were trying to control the area's future, including the plan's prohibition on new construction in the viewshed defined by the plan. This includes views from beaches, turnouts, beaches, Highway 1, and several specific locations:

- Soberanes Point
- Garrapata Beach
- Abalone Cove Vista Point
- Bixby Creek turnout
- Hurricane Point overlook
- Upper Sycamore Canyon Road (from Highway I to Pais Road)
- Pfeiffer Beach/Cooper Beach
- Specific views from Old Coast Road

Harlan said, "Big Sur is going to either become a playground for the very wealthy or it will eventually be federalized because the plan won't work."

Some opponents have criticized the actions of conservation groups like the Big Sur Land Trust as having "turned the buyout of Big Sur into a business, making millions of dollars buying private land and selling it to government agencies." Based on figures developed by Monterey County in 2004, at that time 84% or 255,000 acres (103,000 ha) within the Big Sur Planning Area was restricted from development. Only 45,000 acres (18,000 ha) might be built on, but some of that property is owned by land trusts that also prohibit development.

During development of the land use plan, the Coast Property Owners Association stated that the mandates of the Coastal Act have led to increased costs for planning and permits. They believe the land is becoming so expensive that only wealthy individuals can afford to buy property. They objected to proposed view shed restrictions they believe are threatening Big Sur's alternative reputation and social fabric, leading to a community of millionaires, a few remaining long-term residents, and single residents working in the local hospitality industry who are forced to live in barracks or similar kinds of employee housing.

Mike Caplin, a representative of the Coastal Property Owners Association, said that some coastal residents are concerned about the steady growth of public lands. "When I look out over Big Sur now, I don't just see beauty ... I see my community being dismantled, one parcel at a time."

==== Transfer of development rights ====
To motivate landowners to give up development rights in preferred areas like those near the ocean, the plan includes a controversial element that allows landowners who lose the right to build on one property west of Highway 1 to trade it for the right to develop two other sites where building is permitted. To take advantage of the transfer of development rights ordinance, the owner must dedicate a permanent, irrevocable scenic easement to the county that prohibits residential and commercial use of their property. To encourage adoption of the land use policy, the county offered landowners a two-for-one transfer ratio. Planners recognize that a view of the ocean is worth twice an inland view. For each buildable parcel given up by an owner, they receive the right to transfer their credit to two locations, as long as the usage meets the land use policy restrictions such as density.

The California State Coastal Conservancy bought two parcels of the Victorine Ranch near Point Lobos, totaling 100 acres (40 ha) in the 1980s along with land at Kasler Point west of Highway 1. Their goal was to demonstrate the effectiveness of Monterey County's transfer of development credit program, which was implemented as part of the 1986 Big Sur Coast Land Use Plan. But after giving up the right to build a home on Kasler Point, the Conservancy was unable to convert the resulting two development credits on Victorine Ranch. The property has three buildable lots. The Conservancy had the land appraised at $6 million. They attempted to auction the development credits and the land in 2013. They sold two transfer development credits for $50,000 and $75,000, but failed to receive bids meeting the minimum asking price for the land.

As of 2020, only eight impacted parcels have been leveraged into 16 transfer rights, totaling less than 20 acres, and nine of those have been used since the program was implemented in 1988. The voters also provided a bond that allocates $25 million toward the purchase of properties impacted by the viewshed limitations. Some property owners would rather sell their property or development rights, because using the transfer program requires them to demonstrate that they have buildable lots and also negotiate for purchase of these rights with a receiving site owner.

== Increased real estate costs and housing issues ==
Due to development restrictions and the limited number of parcels available for development, real estate and rental prices are high. As of 2016, the median price of property is $1,813,846, more than three times the state's median price, and more than six times the national price. The average price is $3,942,371, more than 10 times the national average price of $390,400. The average home sold is 1,580 square feet (147 m^{2}) and has 2.39 bedrooms. The median lot size is 436,086 square feet (40,513.7 m^{2}), or just over 10 acres (4.0 ha). About one-quarter of the land along the coast is privately owned. The remainder is part of the federal or state park systems or owned by other agencies, while the interior is largely part of the Los Padres National Forest, Ventana Wilderness, Silver Peak Wilderness, and Fort Hunter Liggett.

=== Non-resident ownership ===
In 2007 and 2017, The New York Times reported that "more than half the homes in the region are owned by part-time residents who live mainly in Los Angeles or around San Francisco Bay," "fund managers and dot-commers coming in who want to buy a slice of heaven." They found that many of the simple cabins and modest bungalows that once comprised most of the housing along Sycamore Canyon Road were being replaced by "sculptural modernistic dwellings that range in value from $2.5 million to $6 million." During preparation of the Big Sur Local Use Plan, the county conducted a mid-decade census in 1976 which found about 800 housing units. About 600 of these were permanent single family dwellings and about 136 or 17% were second homes and vacant. As of 1985, when the Big Sur Land Use Plan was approved, there were about 1,100 private land parcels on the Big Sur Coast. These were from less than an acre to several thousands of acres in size. Approximately 700 parcels were undeveloped, and 370 parcels were occupied. More recently, a title company identified 589 single-family residence parcels in Big Sur.

=== Building permit issues ===
Getting a building permit is a lengthy, multi-year process. From buying a property to beginning construction can require multiple visits to the Monterey County Resource Management Agency. Jay Auburn, a specialist in obtaining building permits, said, "You have to factor in an additional 5 to 10 percent of construction costs just for getting over the regulations." Before construction can begin, the builder must erect flags outlining the physical presence of the proposed building so that regulators can view the proposed construction and determine its visual impact. Homeowners have to mitigate any impact on the environment. County Planning Commissioner Martha Diehl said in 2007 that "The only people who can go through the process are people who can afford it, and that brings social costs."

Many of the developed parcels have more than one residence or commercial building on them. Residential areas include Otter Cove, Garrapata Ridge and the adjacent Rocky Point, Garrapata and Palo Colorado Canyons, Bixby Canyon, Pfeiffer Ridge and Sycamore Canyon, Coastlands, Partington Ridge, Burns Creek, Buck Creek to Lime Creek, Plaskett Ridge, and Redwood Gulch. The plan allows about 800 additional homes to be built, but only in locations where they cannot be seen from the critical viewshed areas.

The areas that have the greatest number of developed parcels, usually 2.5 acres (1.0 ha) or less, are generally located near the highway, including Palo Colorado Canyon, Garrapata Redwood, Rocky Point, Big Sur Valley, Coastlands and Partington Ridge.

=== Limited employee housing ===
About 76% of the local population is dependent on the hospitality industry. Due to the scarcity of rental housing and the high cost of rent, very little affordable housing is available along the coast. Some employees must commute 50 miles (80 km) or more to their work. Kirk Gafill, owner of Nepenthe and the president of Big Sur's Chamber of Commerce, estimated in January 2018 that there were 1,100 workers in Big Sur and about 440 of them commuted from the Monterey Peninsula every day.

Michelle Rizzolo, the owner of the Big Sur Bakery and Restaurant, told the New York Times that she can't find places for her employees to live. "In fact, when we started this place, we all had to sleep on the floor of the bakery."

In January, 2018 the Multiple Listings Service showed only 12 homes in Big Sur available for sale. The least expensive was listed for $1.2 million. Ventana resort was the first local business required by law to provide workforce housing, in 1974. The Post Ranch Inn built its own onsite quarters for its employees in 1992.

The Big Sur Lodge offers low cost, dorm style housing to non-local employees. The Esalen Institute offers limited onsite housing. The Nepenthe restaurant employs 105 people and maintains about 20 workforce housing units.

=== Short-term rental impact on housing ===
In 2015, Monterey County began considering how to deal with the issue of short-term rentals of less than 30 days brought on by services such as Airbnb and Vrbo. They agreed to allow rentals as long as the owners paid the Transient Occupancy Tax. In 1990, there were about 800 housing units in Big Sur, about 600 of which were single family dwellings. There are currently an estimated 100 short-term rentals available.

Many residents of Big Sur object to the short-term rentals. On July 13, 2016, the Monterey County Planning Commission held a workshop on short-term rentals. Many residents complained about their impact on scarce rental properties. One resident stated that there are "almost 100 short-term rentals out of 200 to 300 rentals. That's nearly half of our rental population."

During a fire in 2013, 21 long-term renters lost their homes and were unable to find replacement housing. Planning commissioner Keith Vandevere said there is a "huge daily migration" of workers who drive between the Salinas Valley, the Monterey Peninsula, and Big Sur.

They claim short-term rentals violate the Big Sur Local Use Plan which prohibits establishing facilities that attract destination traffic. Short-term rentals also remove scarce residences from the rental market and are likely to drive up demand and the cost of housing. About half of the residents of Big Sur rent their residences.

The Big Sur coastal land use plan states:

The significance of the residential areas for planning purposes is that they have the capacity, to some extent, to accommodate additional residential demand. Unlike the larger properties or commercial centers, they are not well suited for commercial agriculture, commercial, or visitor uses; use of these areas, to the extent consistent with resource protection, should continue to be for residential purposes.

As of December 2017, the county was conducting hearings and gathering input toward making a decision about short-term rentals on the Big Sur coast. Susan Craig, Central Coast District Manager of the California Coastal Commission, provided the opinion that short-term rentals are appropriate within Big Sur.

During 2021, the Monterey County Civil Grand Jury issued a 27-page report critical of the county's lack of progress in managing short-term rentals. The report stated that the Planning Commission had in June 2020, after seven years of little progress, had written a formal letter to the Board of Supervisors requesting additional policy input on key issues such as affordable housing; support, monitoring, and enforcement; character and intensity; visitor serving unit caps; and unique neighborhoods.

In December 2021, the county found that hundreds of vacation rentals were paying transient occupancy taxes but operating without permits in unincorporated Monterey County, most of them within District 5, including Carmel Valley and Big Sur. County Supervisor Mary Adams has advocated for the county to contract with a short-term rental surveillance company to pursue "the most egregious of violators" and "iron out the glitches" in the county's current 24 year old process. She said she was working to pass a new ordinance within 18 months.

Monterey County issued an estoppel letter on June 16, 2022, that ruled short term rentals along the coast could continue as long as the owner paid appropriate fees and taxes. The county declined to take any enforcement action against short-term rental activity in the Big Sur region. In September 2022, the county published regulations governing short-term rentals in unincorporated areas excluding Big Sur, and continued to work on final regulations for the coast. The regulations required owners to pay a transient occupancy tax, limited rentals to a minimum of seven and a maximum of 30 days. Required permits cost $6,000. County assessors identified 925 residential units in Big Sur. They identified 22 residential properties used as commercial vacation rentals that under the proposed revised ordinance would be prohibited.

== Land use issues ==
The 1976 Coastal Act makes installing public bathrooms, trash bins, or even new road signs along Highway 1 extremely difficult. A number of federal, state, and local agencies have jurisdiction in Big Sur, all of which must weigh in on decisions affecting residents and visitors.

=== Sean Parker wedding ===
On June 1, 2013, former Facebook President Sean Parker married Alexandra Lenas at the Ventana Inn in a wedding at which every guest was given a The Lord of the Rings–style costume. The wedding purportedly cost $10 million to stage.

When Big Sur residents notified the California Coastal Commission of the event three weeks beforehand, they investigated but allowed the wedding to proceed. Many residents were outraged by both Parker's actions and the official response.

The Commission's staff report described the violation:

Within the existing privately run public campground, unpermitted development including, but not limited to: grading; construction of multiple structures including a gateway and arch, an artificial pond, a stone bridge, multiple event platforms with elevated floors, rock walls, artificially created “ruins” of cottage and castle walls, multiple rock stairways, and a dance floor; and installation of over 125 potted trees, potted plants, event tents, port-apotties, generators, lighting, and wedding facilities for guests.

Both Parker and the Ventana Inn did not obtain required permits. The Ventana Inn closed a public campground without permission. A California Coastal Commission spokesperson said "Mr Parker, in essence, leased an ongoing Coastal Act violation when he leased the campground." The wedding was the subject of an article in The Atlantic alleging environmental damage to the redwood forest,

The Ventana Inn asserted that the indemnity signed by Parker covering the event included damages resulting from the wedding, to which he agreed. Parker paid $1.5 million to benefit non-profit organizations that provide coastal access or conservation education and $1 million to the commission. He also created a beach-mapping app that describes how the public can access beaches along the coast. Former Coastal Commissioner Assemblyman Mark Stone said, "To be able to put money back into the same community that cares so much about coastal resources is a very positive thing."

=== Public and private land ownership ===
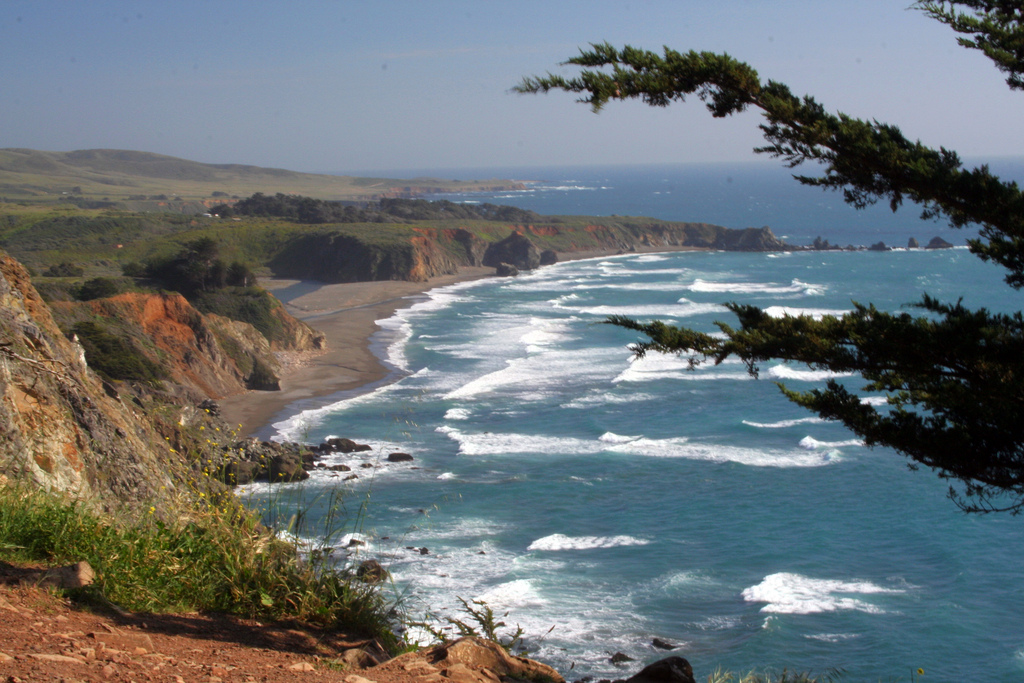
The bay at the mouth of San Carpoforo Creek, considered the southern boundary of Big Sur

There are approximately 1,100 parcels in private ownership on the Big Sur coast. About two-thirds of the coastal zone, totaling about 500,000 acres (200,000 ha), extending from Malpaso Creek in the north to San Carpóforo Canyon in the south, is owned by the California State Department of Parks and Recreation, U.S. Forest Service, U.S. Army, U.S. Coast Guard, and the U.S. Navy. A smaller portion is privately owned by the Big Sur Land Trust and the University of California. These federal, state, local, and private lands are preserved against development.

As of 2016, if public acquisitions now contemplated or in progress are completed, approximately 60% of the land west of the coastal ridge would be publicly owned, although not necessarily open to the public. For example, the Landels-Hill Big Creek Reserve is owned and managed by the University of California Natural Reserve System and the University of California, Santa Cruz. The reserve is only available for research or educational purposes. Reservations are required. The Big Sur Land Trust owns several parcels of land such as the Glen Deven Ranch and Notley's Landing that are closed to the public or only open to its members.

=== Coastal trail ===
In 1972, California voters passed Proposition 20, calling for establishing a coastal trail system. It stipulated that "a hiking, bicycle, and equestrian trails system be established along or near the coast" and that "ideally the trails system should be continuous and located near the shoreline." The California Coastal Act of 1976 requires local jurisdictions to identify an alignment for the California Coastal Trail in their Local Coastal Programs. In 2001, California legislators passed SB 908 which gave the Coastal Conservancy responsibility for completing the trail.

In Monterey County, the trail is being developed in two sections: the Big Sur Trail and the Monterey Bay Sanctuary Trail. In 2007, the Coastal Conservancy began to develop a master plan for the 75 miles (121 km) stretch of coast through Big Sur from near Ragged Point in San Luis Obispo County to the Carmel River. A coalition of Big Sur residents began developing a master plan to accommodate the interests and concerns of coastal residents, but progress on an official trail stalled.

The coastal trail plan is intended to be respectful of the private landowner's rights. One of the largest private land holdings along the coast is El Sur Ranch. It extends about 6 miles (9.7 km) along Highway 1, from near the mouth of the Little Sur River at Hurricane Point to Andrew Molera State Park, and it reaches 2.5 miles (4.0 km) up the Little Sur valley to the border of the Los Padres National Forest. The landowner Jim Hill supports the trail, but his land is already crossed by two public routes, Highway 1 and the Old Coast Highway. He is opposed to another public right-of-way through the ranch. In 2008, Representative Sam Farr from Carmel told attendees at a meeting in Big Sur that "I don't think you're going to see an end-to-end trail anytime in the near future." He said, "The regulatory hassle is unbelievable. It's like we're building an interstate freeway." Within Monterey County, about 20 miles (32 km) of the trail would cross private lands.

The acquisition of lands by the Big Sur Land Trust and others has created a 70 miles (110 km) long wildland corridor that begins at the Carmel River and extends southward to the Hearst Ranch in San Luis Obispo County. From the north, the wild land corridor is continuous through Palo Corona Ranch, Point Lobos Ranch, Garrapata State Park, Joshua Creek Ecological Preserve, Mittledorf Preserve, Glen Deven Ranch, Brazil Ranch, Los Padres National Forest, and the Ventana Wilderness. Many of these lands are distant from the coast, and the coastal trail plan calls for placing the trail, "Wherever feasible, ... within sight, sound, or at least the scent of the sea. The traveler should have a persisting awareness of the Pacific Ocean. It is the presence of the ocean that distinguishes the seaside trail from other visitor destinations."

As an alternative to the trail called for by the act, hikers have adopted a route that utilizes existing roads and inland trails. The trail currently follows State Highway One and the Old Coast Road from Bixby Bridge. The trail south of Bixby Creek enters Brazil Ranch, which requires permission to enter. From Brazil Ranch the trail drops back to Highway One at Andrew Molera State Park. From Highway One, the trail then follows the Coast Ridge Road from the Ventana Inn area to Kirk Creek Campground. The trail then moves inland and follows the Cruikshank and Buckeye trails on the Santa Lucia Mountain ridges to the San Luis Obispo County line. As of January 2018, the Old Coast Road is closed to through traffic due to damage from winter rains following the Soberanes fire.

== Federal management proposed ==
Several proposals for federal administration of Big Sur have emerged in the past. All of these have been strongly opposed by county officials, local residents, and property owners. Alan Perlmutter, owner of the Big Sur River Inn in 2004, visited U.S. Representative Phillip Burton in Washington D.C. during the late 1970s to discuss federal legislation. Burton, a Democrat who represented San Francisco, was then considered the national "park czar." Perlmutter said that Burton told him and others present, "If you think you're going to get that [expletive] turf, you're out of your mind. That [expletive] turf belongs to me."

=== Big Sur National Scenic Area ===
In January 1980, while the local leaders worked on their local use plan, California's Senator Alan Cranston and Monterey area U.S. Representative Leon Panetta introduced S.2551 that would create the Big Sur Coast National Scenic Area. The bill designated a 700,000 acres (280,000 ha) scenic area to be administered by the U.S. Forest Service. It budgeted $100 million to buy land from private land owners, up to $30 million for easements and management programs, and enforced a state plan for a zone about 75 miles (121 km) long and 5 miles (8.0 km) wide.

The bill was strongly supported by photographer and Carmel Highlands, California resident Ansel Adams, who had been a member of the Board of Directors of the Sierra Club for 37 years until 1971. He had never lived in Big Sur. In February 1980, the Wilderness Society announced its backing for a National Scenic Area in Big Sur. The bill was opposed by California Senator S. I. Hayakawa, development interests, and Big Sur residents. Local residents mocked the plan as 'Panetta's Pave 'n' Save,' and raised a fund of more than $100,000 to lobby against the proposal. The legislation was blocked by Hayakawa in the Energy Committee and did not reach a vote.

=== Big Sur National Parkway ===
In 1985, William Penn Mott, then director of the National Park Service, proposed establishing a Big Sur National Parkway similar to the Blue Ridge Parkway that crosses the Appalachian Mountains. He encountered fierce opposition from local residents. Many believe that federalization of the region would lead to poor management and an excessive surge of tourists.

=== National Forest Scenic Area ===
In March 1986, California Senator Pete Wilson—without advance notification of local Representative Leon Panetta, Monterey County, or local residents—announced that he planned to introduce federal legislation that would preserve 144,000 acres (58,000 ha) of Big Sur as a National Forest Scenic Area. Senator Alan Cranston endorsed Wilson's bill. The plan would have created a Big Sur-based land trust funded by private donations to purchase private property. It was opposed by local residents and politicians who preferred local control. His unannounced action created suspicion. Residents feared creation of a federal scenic area would draw millions of tourists. In the face of widespread local opposition, the bill failed to garner enough votes for consideration.

=== Big Sur National Forest ===
In 2004, Representative Sam Farr asked the U.S. Forest Service to study how a Big Sur National Forest could be created. They explored options including the Hearst Ranch and Ft. Hunter Liggett if it was the subject of a base closure. Farr did not act on the Forest Service report until 2011, when he introduced H.R. 4040, the "Big Sur Management Unit Act". It would have made Big Sur a distinct unit within the National Forest system, improved access to federal funding, and given unit managers greater autonomy. The bill would also have added Big Creek, Arroyo Seco River, Church Creek, Tassajara Creek, San Antonio River, and Carmel River above the Los Padres Reservoir to the National Wild and Scenic Rivers System, added lands to wilderness areas, memorialized an official Arroyo Seco-Indians National Recreational Trail, and designated a 65 acres (26 ha) tract of rare maritime chaparral above Pfeiffer Beach as the Jeff Norman Botanical Area.

Big Sur property owners opposed the legislation in part because when land is designated for wilderness, firefighters must obtain the permission of the Regional Forester to operate heavy equipment such as bulldozers within the wilderness. They contend this bureaucratic chain-of-command slows firefighters' ability to respond to fires, which they contend occurred during the 1977 Marble Cone Fire, when Los Padres National Forest supervisor Al West refused to allow the first on-scene units from the Big Sur Fire Brigade to attack the fire.

The residents also expressed concern that federal government didn't have the resources to manage land it already oversees. They were also distrustful of federal oversight of their local lands. The act failed to gather support in Congress.

=== Mining and oil exploration ===
Mount Pico Blanco is topped by a distinctive white limestone cap, visible from California State Route 1. The Granite Rock Company of Watsonville, California has since 1963 owned the mineral rights to 2,800 acres (1,100 ha), or all of section 36, which is located to the west and south of the summit of Pico Blanco Mountain. Limestone is a key ingredient in concrete and Pico Blanco contains a particularly high grade deposit, reportedly the largest in California, and the largest west of the Rocky Mountains. In 1980 Granite Rock applied for a permit from the U.S. Forest Service to begin excavating a 5-acre (2.0 ha) quarry on the south face of Pico Blanco within the National Forest boundary.

After the Forest Service granted the permit, the California Coastal Commission required Graniterock to apply for a coastal development permit in accordance with the requirements of the California Coastal Act. Granite Rock filed suit, claiming that the Coastal Commission permit requirement was preempted by the Forest Service review. When Granite Rock prevailed in the lower courts, the Coastal Commission appealed to the Supreme Court of the United States. California sought to change the division of power between the federal government and the states over control of land-use decisions. California wanted to enforce stricter state standards over mining operations on federal land. It was joined in its appeal by nine other Western states, including Arizona, Utah, Montana, New Mexico and Wyoming. California sought a ruling on the constitutionality the Mining Act of 1872 that made it impossible to enforce state environmental standards. The Supreme Court, in a historic 5–4 decision in 1987, found in favor of the commission.

By this time Granite Rock's permit had expired. In 2010, the company's president stated that he believed that at some point the company would be allowed to extract the limestone in a way that doesn't harm the environment. As of 2017, they still own the land, which is zoned WSC/40-D(CZ) for Watershed and Scenic Conservation.

There are oil and gas reserves off the coast, but exploration has not been permitted. In 1982, Interior Secretary James G. Watt proposed opening the Central California coast outer continental shelf to oil and gas exploration. California residents and politicians strongly opposed the proposal and it was defeated. In 1990, President George H. W. Bush used an obscure 1953 law to permanently ban oil and gas development in California's Monterey Bay. In November, 2017, President Obama used the same law to ban oil exploration from Hearst Castle to Point Arena in Mendocino County, California.

In July 2017, under the direction of Executive Order 13795 from President Donald Trump, the U.S. Department of Commerce began re-evaluating the protected status of the Monterey Bay National Marine Sanctuary, which includes the Davidson Seamount off the coast of Big Sur. The seamount, at 23 nmi (43 km; 26 mi) long, 7 nmi (13 km; 8.1 mi) wide, and 7,480 feet (2,280 m) high, is one of the largest in the world. Opening the area to oil and gas exploration was opposed by many environmentalists and residents.
