= Hollywood Legion Stadium =

Boxing venue in California

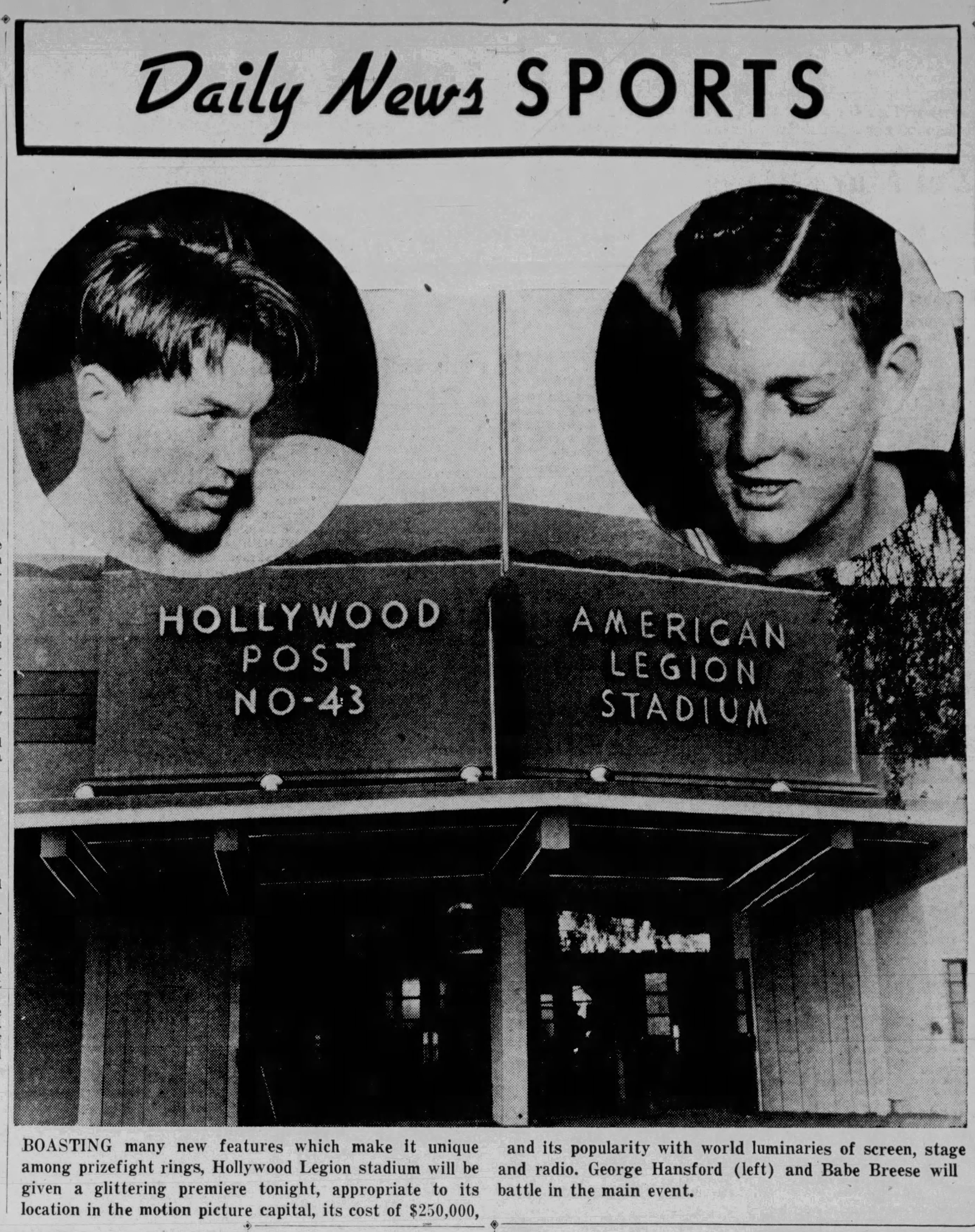
- Hollywood Legion Stadium, September 1938

General information
- Address: 1628 El Centro Avenue, Los Angeles, California
- Coordinates: 34.1016°N 118.324°W

The Hollywood Legion Stadium was a major boxing venue in Los Angeles, California, United States that operated from August 12, 1921, until 1960. Hollywood Legion Stadium was located at the corner of Hollywood Boulevard and El Centro Avenue in the Hollywood neighborhood.

== History ==
Hollywood Post 43 of the American Legion bought the land with the profits from an all-star staging of the play Arizona at the Philharmonic Auditorium. Originally an open-air venue with a little clubhouse where the boxers changed, the venue was roofed in early 1922. Manager Si Masters came up with the idea creating ringside boxes for celebrities, which in turn attracted press attention, and before long "Crowds began to flock to Hollywood. The $35,000 deficit disappeared. Walls went up on the stadium, camp chairs were replaced by regular seats. The dirt floor disappeared under cement. It became harder and harder to get seats at the fights—the Legion Stadium was by way of becoming a howling success..." Hollywood Legion Stadium made an appearance in the 1922 promo short Hollywood Snapshots, with intertitles stating that Charlie Chaplin, Douglas Fairbanks, and Charles Ray were known to attend the fights. Later, Lloyd Underwood of KNX began broadcasting the fights over the radio, which resulted in another boost in popularity for the venue. From 1921 until 1938, the seating capacity was a little over 4,400. The venue remained open the night of the 1933 Long Beach earthquake, and when the crowd was rocked by an aftershock, the band started playing and the audience sang along, to sooth everyone's nerves. Al Jolson punched out Walter Winchell at the stadium (in an informal capacity) on July 31, 1933, due to Winchell allegedly having insulted Jolson's wife Ruby Keeler.

The original building was condemned in 1938. Albert C. Miller designed the new building. The new building opened in September with seats for 6,000 guests. Navajo bantamweight Benny Cleveland died of a brain hemorrhage in 1947 following a blow to the head during a fight at the Hollywood Legion Stadium. Beginning in 1960, the building was used as a bowling alley (the Hollywood Legion Lanes). The bowling alley lasted until 1985, and then the building was renovated and became the Hollywood Holiday Spa.

== Gallery ==
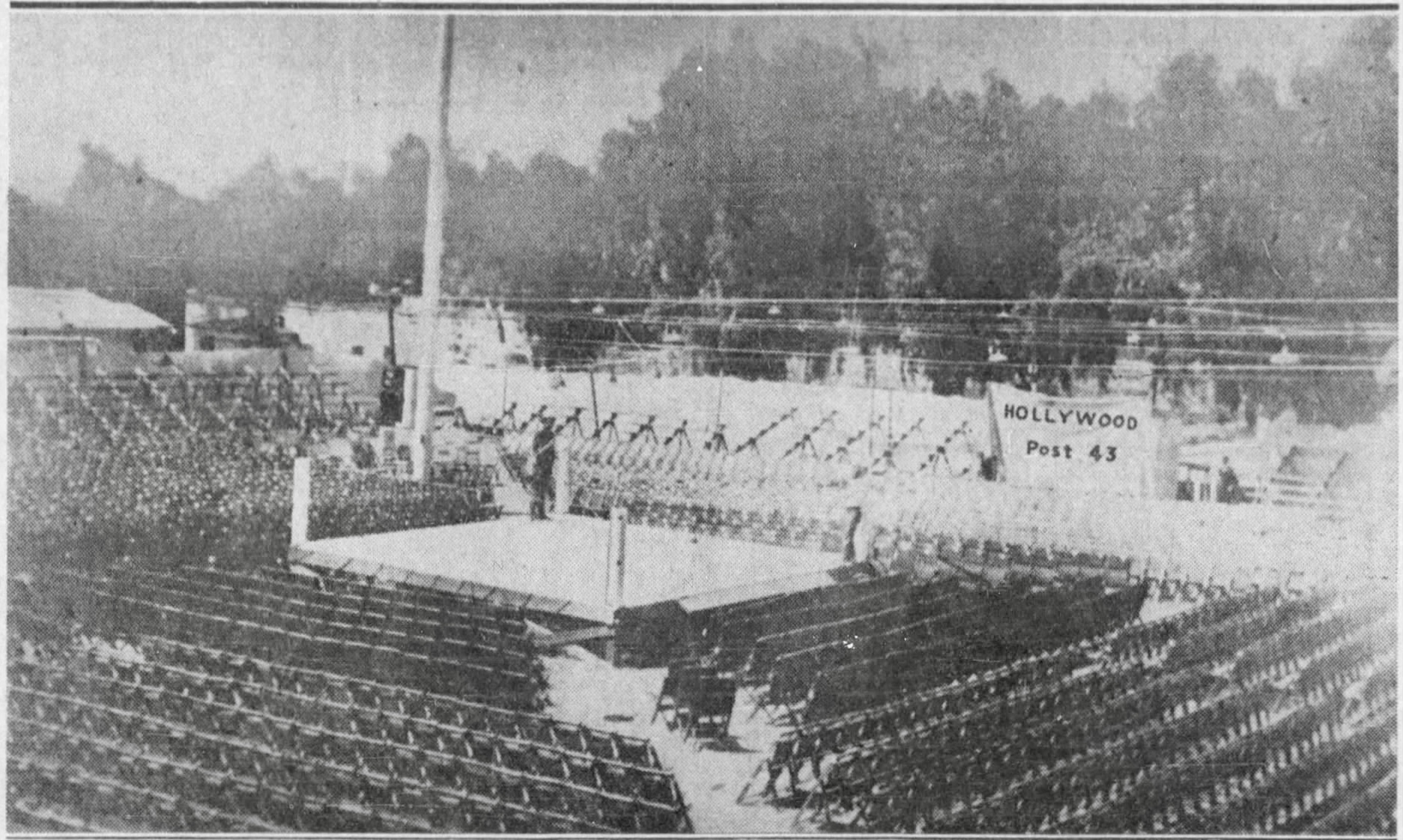
Hollywood Legion Stadium, photographed 1921, when it was simply an open-air boxing ring

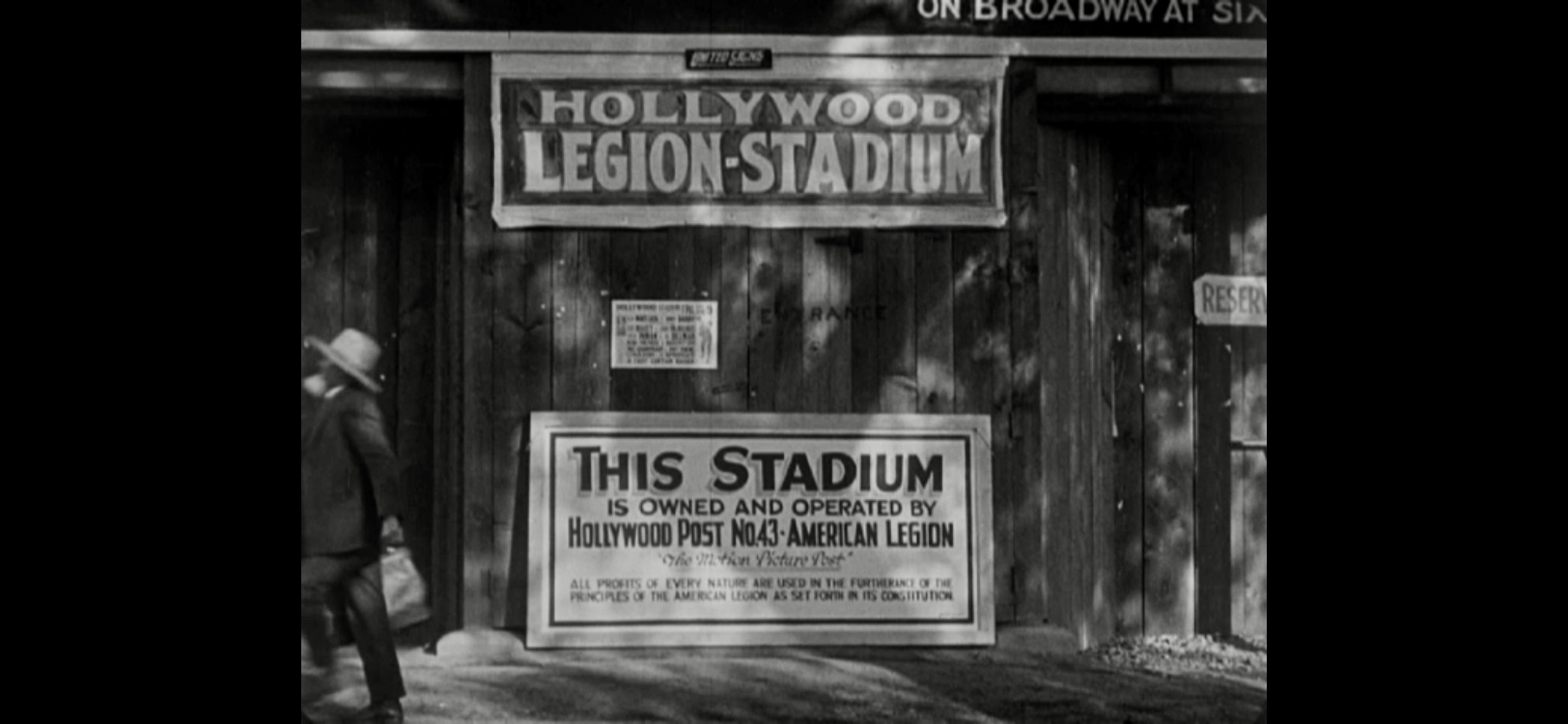
Hollywood Legion Stadium in Hollywood Snapshots (1922), a publicity short intended to improve the reputation of the film colony

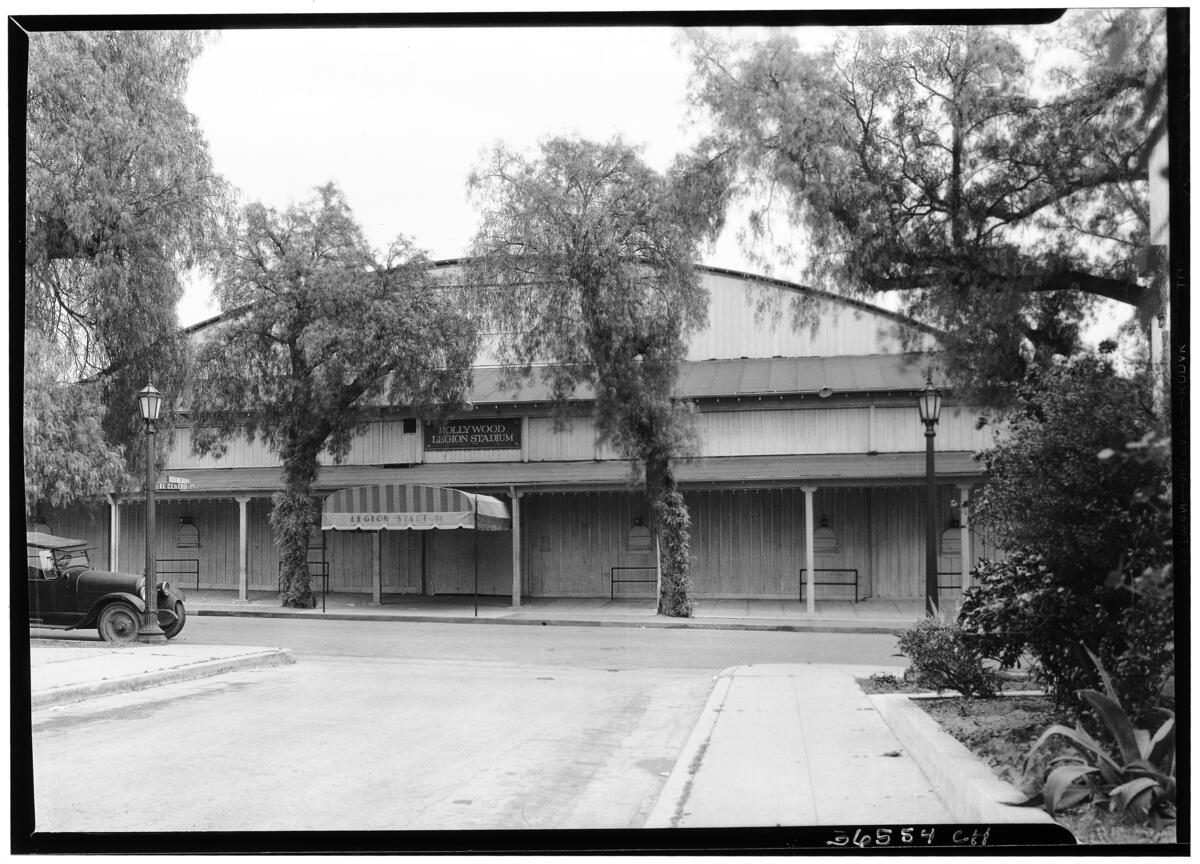
Hollywood Legion Stadium c. 1930 (California Historical Society 36554 via USC Libraries)

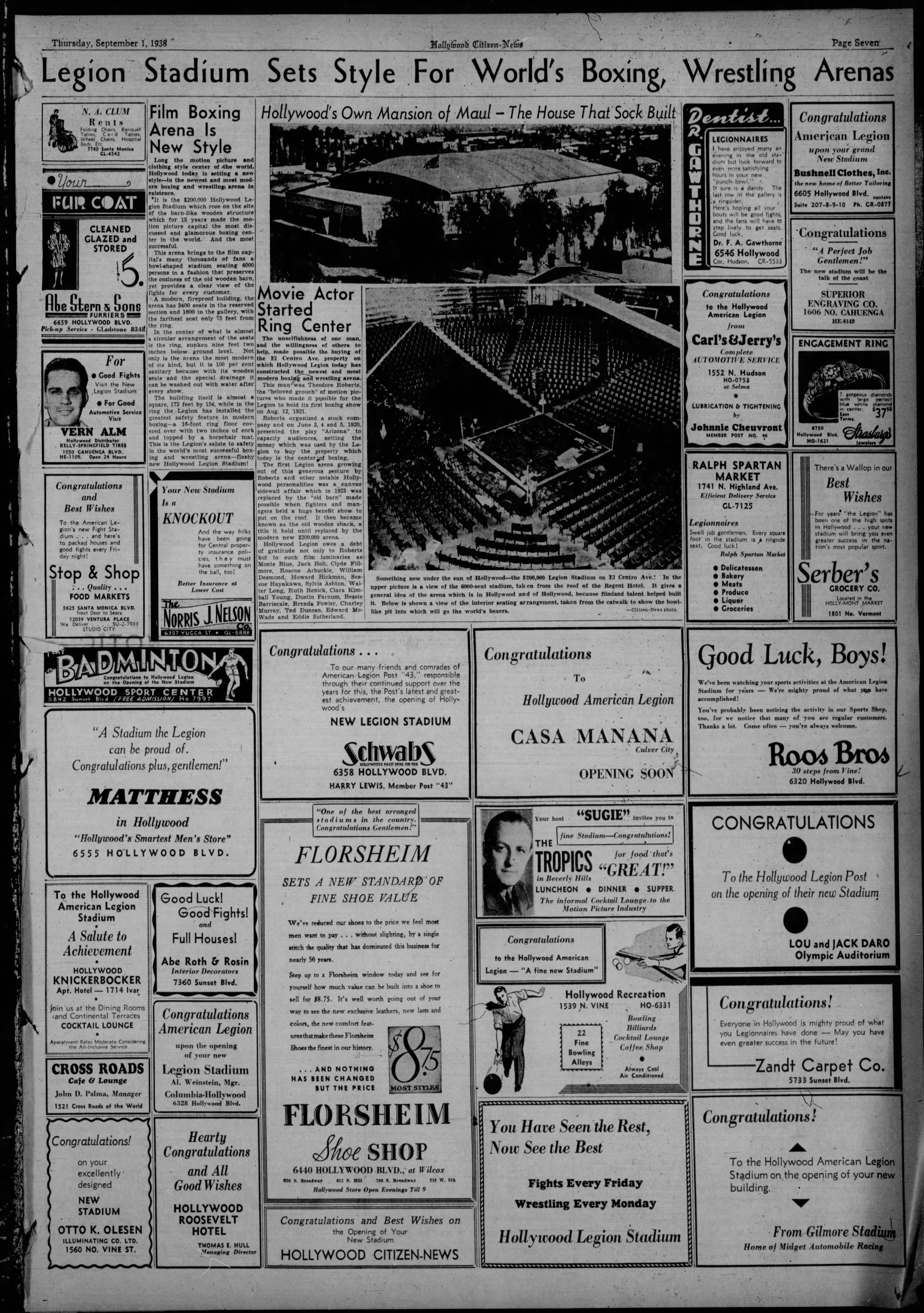
"Legion Sets Style" Hollywood Evening Citizen News, September 1, 1938

== See also ==
- Vernon Arena – 20th-century California boxing venue
- Grand Olympic Auditorium – Multi-purpose arena in California, United States
- 1914 California Proposition 20
- 1924 California Proposition 7
