= Alice Bergel =

German-American literary scholar

Alice Rose Bergel, née Berger (1911 - 1998) was a German-American literary scholar who taught at the University of California, Irvine. She collaborated with her husband, Kurt Bergel, on several editions and translations of writing by Albert Schweitzer.

== Life ==
Berger was born on 15 June 1911 in Berlin, the daughter of Bruno Martin Berger and Else J. Solon. She studied at the University of Berlin and the University of Freiberg from 1929 to 1933, and gained a PhD in Romance languages and philosophy from the University of Berlin in 1934. She married Kurt Bergel on 28 August 1938. She escaped Nazi Germany to England in 1939, and moved to the United States in 1941.

She and her husband founded the Albert Schweitzer Institute at Chapman University. The couple collaborated on a translation of Schweitzer's memoirs of his childhood.

== Works ==
- (tr. and ed. with Kurt Bergel) Albert Schweitzer and Alice Ehlers: a friendship in letters, 1991
- (ed. with Kurt Bergel) "Liebes Cembalinchen--": Albert Schweitzer, Alice Ehlers: eine Freundschaft in Briefen, 1997
- (tr. with Kurt Bergel) Memoirs of childhood and youth by Albert Schweitzer. Syracuse: Syracuse University Press, 1997
- (tr. with Kurt Bergel) The stone breakers and other novellas by Ferdinand von Saar, 1998
