= California Proposition 16 =

California Proposition 16 may refer to:

- 1922 California Proposition 16
- 2010 California Proposition 16
- 2020 California Proposition 16
