= Peter Douglas (disambiguation) =

Peter Douglas (born 1955) is an American television and film producer.

Peter Douglas may also refer to:

- Peter John Douglas (1787–1858), British Royal Naval officer
- Peter M. Douglas (1942–2012), American environmentalist
