= California Coastal Commission =

State agency regulating coastal land use

- California Coastal Commission Logo

Agency overview
- Formed: 1972; 54 years ago
- Jurisdiction: California
- Headquarters: San Francisco
- Employees: 205 (2024–2025)
- Annual budget: $48 million (2024–2025)
- Agency executive: Kate Huckelbridge, Executive Director
- Parent agency: California Natural Resources Agency
- Website: coastal.ca.gov

The California Coastal Commission (CCC) is a state agency within the California Natural Resources Agency with quasi-judicial control of land and public access along the state's 1,100 miles (1,800 km) of coastline. Its mission as defined in the California Coastal Act is "to protect, conserve, restore, and enhance the environment of the California coastline".

Protection of coastal resources includes shoreline public access and recreation, lower cost visitor accommodations, terrestrial and marine habitat protection, visual resources, and regulation of agricultural lands, commercial fisheries, and industrial infrastructure. By regulating land use within a defined coastal zone extending inland from 3,000 ft (910 m) up to 5 mi (8.0 km), it has the authority to control construction of any type, including buildings, housing, roads, and fire and erosion abatement structures, and it can issue fines for unapproved construction. It has been called the single most powerful land-use authority in the United States due to its purview over vast environmental assets and extremely valuable real estate.

Critics say that the CCC has exceeded its mission, exacerbated California's housing shortage by limiting housing supply in some of the state's most affluent areas, and harmed the environment by defending parking infrastructure, blocking public transit and scuttling dense housing development; proponents say that the commission has protected open space, views, habitats, endangered species, and public coastal access.

== Composition ==
The commission is composed of 12 voting members, 6 chosen from the general public, and 6 appointed elected officials. Being on the commission can carry responsibilities which are highly politicized. The 12 appointed commissioners control zoning, compel property alterations, impose fines, bestow construction approvals or vetoes, and require public thoroughfares on private property.

Separate from the appointed Commissioners are the commission's employed staff, numbering some 164 people during 2021–22.

Jonathan Zasloff, a law professor at the University of California, Los Angeles, stated that "The commission is the single most powerful land use authority in the United States given the high values of its jurisdiction and its high environmental assets." and that, because its members are appointed by the governor and the State Senate and Assembly leaders (which have generally been Democrats), "The commission reflects a constituency that is important to Democrats."

== Authority ==
Development activities are broadly defined by the Coastal Act to include (among others) construction of buildings, divisions of land, and activities that change the intensity of use of land or public access to coastal waters. Development usually requires a Coastal Development Permit from either the Coastal Commission or the local government if such development would occur within the Coastal Zone. The Coastal Zone is specifically defined by law as an area that extends from the State's seaward boundary of jurisdiction, and inland for a distance from the Mean High Tide Line of between a couple of hundred feet in urban areas, to up to five miles in rural areas.

The state authority controls construction along the state's 1,100 miles (1,800 km) of shoreline. One of the provisions passed under the 1976 California Coastal Act specifically prohibits State Route 1 from being widened beyond one lane in each direction within rural areas inside the Coastal Zone. The Coastal Commission also had the power to block a proposed southern extension of State Route 241 to Interstate 5 at San Onofre State Beach in San Diego County.

The Coastal Commission has the ability to overrule local elected representatives and has also gained the ability to fine private citizens. The agency has sought enforcement through the courts as it originally did not have the power to issue fines on its own to alleged violators. A bill in the California legislature to grant the commission a broad power to issue fines was defeated in September 2013. However legislation attached to the state budget in the summer of 2014 finally granted the authority to impose fines on violators of public-access which could apply to about a third of the backlog of over 2,000 unresolved enforcement cases. The first notable fines were issued in December 2016 against Malibu property owners Dr. Warren M. Lent and his wife, for $4.2 million, and Simon and Daniel Mani, owners of the Malibu Beach Inn, who settled amicably for $925,000. The difference in severity of the fines were attributed to the "egregious" nature of the Lent case.

== Local agency administration ==
A "local coastal program" is the official name for a zoning plan controlled by the commission but administered by a local agency. The commission can retake granular control of any project if it is appealed. An appeal will take approximately 6–8 months on average to reach a final decision and may take longer to resolve more complicated appeals.

The commission is the primary agency which issues Coastal Development Permits. However, once a local agency (a County, City, or Port) has a Local Coastal Program (LCP) which has been certified by the commission, that agency takes over the responsibility for issuing Coastal Development Permits. For areas with Certified LCP's, the Commission does not issue Coastal Development permits (except in certain areas where the Commission retains jurisdiction, i.e. public trust lands), and is instead responsible for reviewing amendments to a local agency's LCP, or reviewing Coastal Development Permits issued by local agencies which have been appealed to the commission.

A Local Coastal Program is composed of a Land Use Plan (LUP) and an Implementation Plan (IP). A Land Use Plan details the Land Uses which are permissible in each part of the local government's area, and specifies the general policies which apply to each land use. The LUP can be a part of a local government's general plan. The Implementation Plan is responsible for implementing the policies contained in the LUP. The IP is generally a part of the city's zoning code.

=== One example ===
The Local Coastal Program (LCP) for a run-down gateway to Channel Islands Harbor in Oxnard is designated for visitor-serving commercial uses and harbor-related uses that support recreational boating and fishing. The county owns and manages the harbor and wanted to amend the LCP to allow a mixed-use development with up to 400 apartments as their selected developer said the project was only feasible with the housing. In 2020, the commission refused to override the denial by the city of Oxnard of land-use changes as that is only intended to be used in rare instances when a local government is standing in the way of the development of a public works project that would meet regional public needs.

=== Managed retreat ===
The Commission recommended cities implement managed retreat philosophies allowing oceans to naturally erode developments thereby nourishing beaches with reclaimed sand made of disintegrated former properties.

In 2019, after the Commission allowed a new seawall to be constructed to protect apartments built in 1972, but denied a permit for townhomes built in 1984, the owners of the 1984 townhomes sued. The Commission reasoned that the Coastal Act states that the Commission "shall" issue permits for coastal armoring designed to protect "existing structures," which the Commission interpreted as existing at the time of the passage of the Coastal Act, 1977. In 2023, the judge ruled for the plaintiffs, stating that the Commission's position was an “erroneous and unreasonable” interpretation of the law.

The Commission appealed the ruling, and observers have stated that the final result of this litigation will have far-reaching consequences on the future of California's coast. Currently, 14% of the whole of the California coastline, and 38% of Southern California beaches are protected with seawalls. One proposal to remedy this situation and allow managed retreat was a bill which would have created a state fund used to purchase threatened properties from homeowners, then rent them back to the resident to live in until it is no longer safe to do so.

== History ==
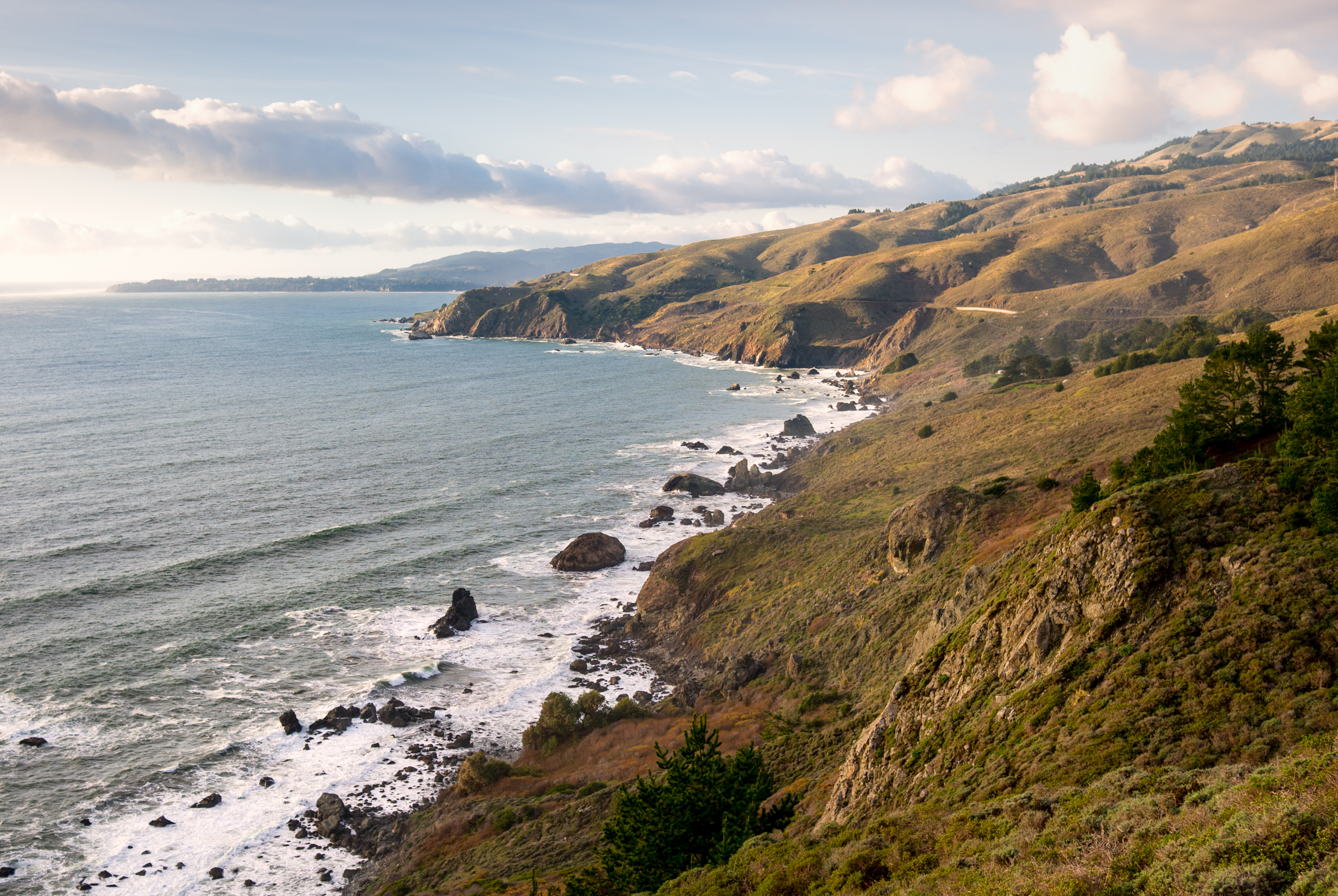
Northern California Coast as seen from Muir Beach Overlook

The California Coastal Commission was established in 1972 by voter initiative via Proposition 20. This was partially in response to the controversy surrounding the development of Sea Ranch, a planned coastal community in Sonoma County. Sea Ranch's developer-architect, Al Boeke, envisioned a community that would preserve the area's natural beauty. But the plan for Sea Ranch eventually grew to encompass 10 miles (16 km) of the Sonoma County coastline that would have been reserved for private use. This and other similar coastal projects prompted opponents to form activist groups. Their efforts eventually led to putting Proposition 20 on the ballot.

Proposition 20 gave the Coastal Commission permit authority for four years. The California Coastal Act of 1976 extended the Coastal Commission's authority indefinitely. Jerry Brown, in his first term as governor, signed the California Coastal Act into law, but two years later, became frustrated with the commission and called them "bureaucratic thugs". Peter M. Douglas helped write the act in addition to Proposition 20 and was subsequently employed as the Executive Director of the Coastal Commission for 26 years. In 2011 the Commissioners chose Charles Lester as Douglas's replacement, but then fired him in 2016.

Accounting for 164 percent inflation, the commission's total funding declined 26 percent from $22.1 million in 1980 ($13.5 million in then-current dollars) to $16.3 million in 2010. The commission's full-time staff fell from 212 in 1980 to 125 in 2010. There are 16 Commission employees working in the enforcement function to investigate violations along the 1,100 miles (1,800 km) of coastline. The commission's total budget for fiscal year 2019-2020 was $32,086,000 The total compensation of the commission's executive director John L. Ainsworth was $254,000 in 2019, Charles F. Lester's was $177,000 in 2015, and Peter M. Douglas's was $213,000 in 2011. Including the proposed budget for fiscal year 2021–22, the cumulative expenses of the Commission since 2007 exceed $348 million.

From 1977 to 1981, the commission was also empowered under Section 30213 of the Coastal Act to develop statewide interpretive guidelines for affordable housing in the coastal zone for persons of low and moderate income, with the approval of approximately 5000 affordable units (two-thirds of which were in San Diego, Orange, and Los Angeles counties), prevention of the demolition of 1,200 existing affordable units, and collection of over $2 million in in-lieu fees. After backlash from coastal city governments, the Mello Act (SB 626), authored by Henry J. Mello, was passed, repealing the affordable housing portion of Section 30213 and mandating that "No local coastal program shall be required to include housing policies and programs."

In 2023, the commission lobbied against California state legislative proposals that would ease housing construction in areas under the CCC's remit. Under the legislative proposals, housing that complies with zoning rules and environmental protection laws, would be fast-tracked in areas of the state that have not met their state-set housing goals. By exempting these housing developments from lengthy public hearings and environmental legal challenges, the proposals would effectively cut the CCC out of the housing permitting process. One bill which was signed into law, SB 423, narrowed the broad prohibition in SB 35 within the coastal zone (and, by extension, the broad powers of the Coastal Act and the CCC to prohibit streamlined multifamily housing within the zone), allowing for some areas in the coastal zone to be eligible for streamlined multifamily housing development.

In 2025, the CCC's administrative functions were curtailed by California Assembly Bill 130 which aims to streamline the process by which new developments are approved across the state.

=== U.S. Supreme Court cases ===
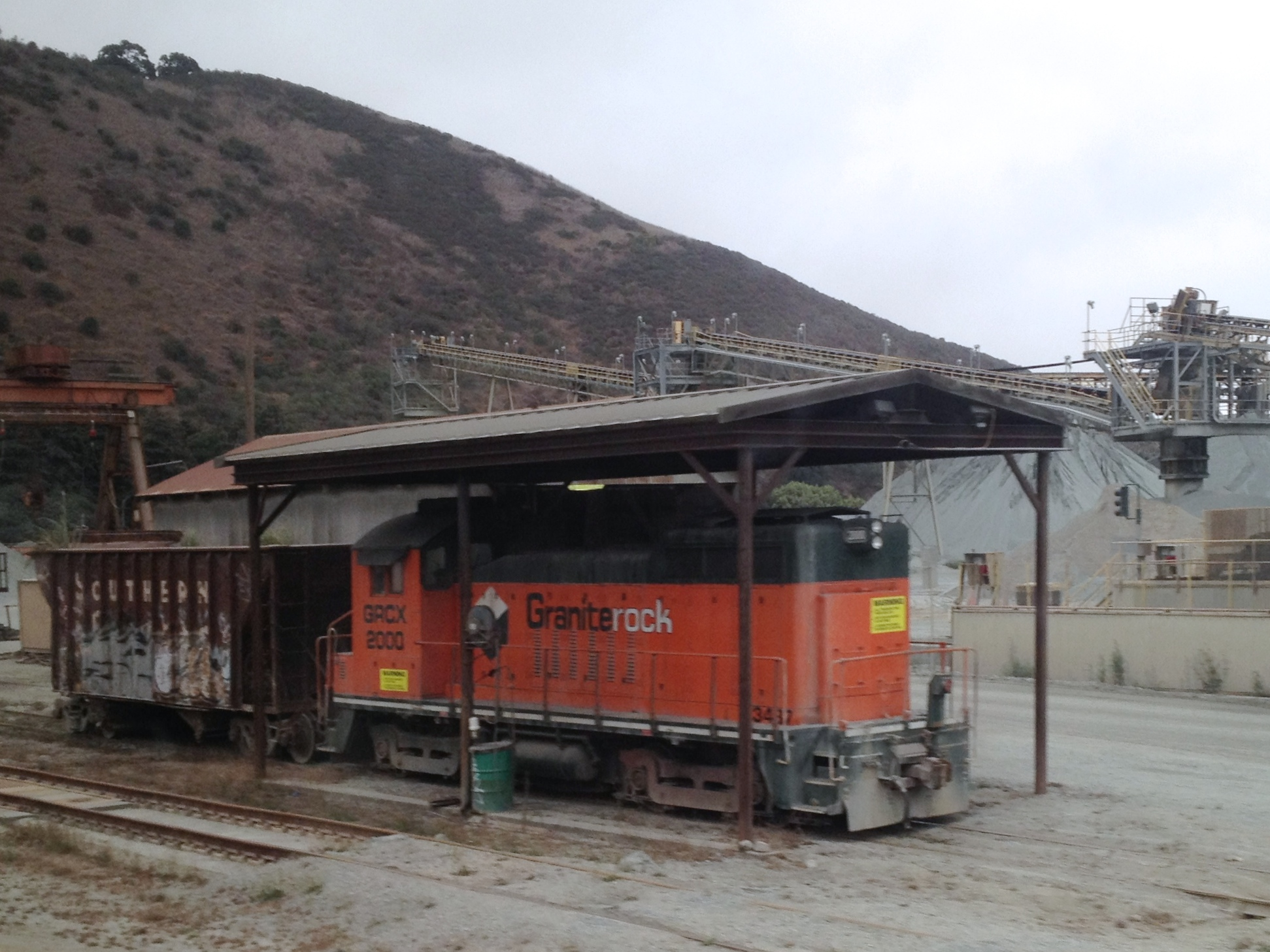
Granite Rock diesel locomotive and hopper car in Aromas, California, 2013

The Supreme Court of the United States ruled in the 1987 case of Nollan v. California Coastal Commission that a requirement by the agency was a taking in violation of the Fifth and Fourteenth Amendments. The Coastal Commission had required that a lateral public easement along the Nollans' beachfront lot be dedicated to facilitate pedestrian access to public beaches as a condition of approval of a permit to demolish an existing bungalow and replace it with a three-bedroom house. The Coastal Commission had asserted that the public-easement condition was imposed to promote the legitimate state interest of diminishing the "blockage of the view of the ocean" caused by construction of the larger house. The court, in a narrow decision, ruled that an "essential nexus" must exist between the legitimate state interest and the permit condition imposed by government, otherwise the building restriction "is not a valid regulation of land use but an out-and-out plan of extortion."

The commission won its attempt to require a permit for activity on a pharmaceutical limestone quarry owned by Granite Rock Company of Watsonville, California, in the United States Supreme Court case California Coastal Comm'n v. Granite Rock Co. Granite Rock's approved Forest Service permit to excavate pharmaceutical limestone expired by the time the case was decided.

== Reactions ==
Critics of the commission's authority say it has exceeded its mission, violated the constitutional property rights of citizens, worsened the California housing shortage by limiting dense housing development and harmed the environment by defending parking infrastructure and blocking public transit projects.

Proponents say that the Commission has protected open space, views, habitats, endangered species, and public coastal access, and therefore argue that it should be given even greater authority to control housing projects within its jurisdiction.

Jeff Jennings, the mayor of Malibu commented: "The commission basically tells us what to do, and we're expected to do it. And in many cases that extends down to the smallest details imaginable, like what color you paint your houses, what kind of light bulbs you can use in certain places."

== Enforcement ==
The agency is tasked with protection of coastal resources, including shoreline public access and recreation, lower cost visitor accommodations, terrestrial and marine habitat protection, visual resources, landform alteration, agricultural lands, commercial fisheries, industrial uses, water quality, offshore oil and gas development, transportation, development design, power plants, ports, and public works. The commission's responsibilities are described in the California Coastal Act, especially the Chapter 3 policies. The agency has sought enforcement through the courts as it originally did not have the power to issue fines on its own to alleged violators. A bill in the California legislature to grant the commission a broad power to issue fines was defeated in September 2013. However legislation attached to the state budget in the summer of 2014 finally granted the authority to impose fines on violators of public-access which could apply to about a third of the backlog of over 2,000 unresolved enforcement cases. The first notable fines were issued in December 2016 against Malibu property owners Warren M. Lent and his wife, for $4.2 million, and Simon and Daniel Mani, owners of the Malibu Beach Inn, who settled amicably for $925,000. The difference in severity of the fines were attributed to the "egregious" nature of the Lent case.

=== Affordable overnight coastal accommodations ===
According to the commission, the California Coastal Act requires that "overnight accommodations in the Coastal Zone are [be] available at a range of price points." When permitting new hotels, they usually try to require 25% of bookings at expensive hotels be offered at lower rates, or, in the case of a developer who is adding a small boutique style hotel to a beach property, they will be required (in 2021) to pay $150,000 into a fund which will help to provide for lower cost accommodations in the region.

In 2019, the commission fined a hotel builder $15.5 million after it "replaced two of the only low-cost motels in Santa Monica with a luxury boutique hotel, without a permit," the commission said in a statement. "We as an agency have a mandate to encourage public access on the California coast and that means doing everything we can to ensure people can actually afford to stay there," said Dayna Bochco, who chairs the commission.

=== Convenient beach parking ===
In 2022, the commission forced San Diego to require off-street parking for accessory dwelling units within the Coastal Zone in order to reduce potential demand for public parking close to beaches, so that non-residents can find convenient beach parking.

In 2023, the commission required restaurants on the San Diego beach to replace any street parking spaces "lost" to permanent outdoor dining structures (San Diego's "Spaces as Places" outdoor dining program) that had grown extremely popular after first being implemented on a temporary basis during the COVID pandemic with other parking spaces no more than 1,200 feet away.

=== Examples ===
In 2018, a high-profile case was resolved without litigation: at tech billionaire Sean Parker's 2013 wedding in Big Sur, where extensive staging was installed in an ecologically sensitive area without a proper permit, Parker cooperated with the Commission and created a mobile app named YourCoast to help visitors discover 1,500 access points to beaches as well as report violations. He also paid $2.5 million in penalties even though the property owner was at fault and had illegally closed the area to the public for six years.

The Ritz-Carlton Hotel in Half Moon Bay was ordered to pay $1.6 million in penalties for failing to provide public access to its nearby beaches in 2019. Cars of hotel guests and golfers would be parked in public spaces by the valets or public access was simply denied to those spaces.

In 2020, the commission fined 33 Newport Beach residents a total of $1.7 million because their yards encroached on the beach, and required that the beach be returned to its natural state.

In 2019, during the process of replacing wooden power poles with steel poles to reduce wildfire risk, the Los Angeles Department of Water and Power (LADWP) graded fire roads and created new roads on Environmentally Sensitive Habitat Areas in Topanga State Park which destroyed almost 200 endangered Braunton's milkvetch plants on 9 acres (3.6 ha)(10% of those plants in the area). The city agreed that its utility will pay the commission's fine of $1.9 million and will follow the restoration order requiring LADWP to apply for a coastal development permit to complete the project and to restore 9 acres (3.6 ha) of habitat within the coastal zone and an additional 17 acres (6.9 ha) outside the zone.

=== Other ===
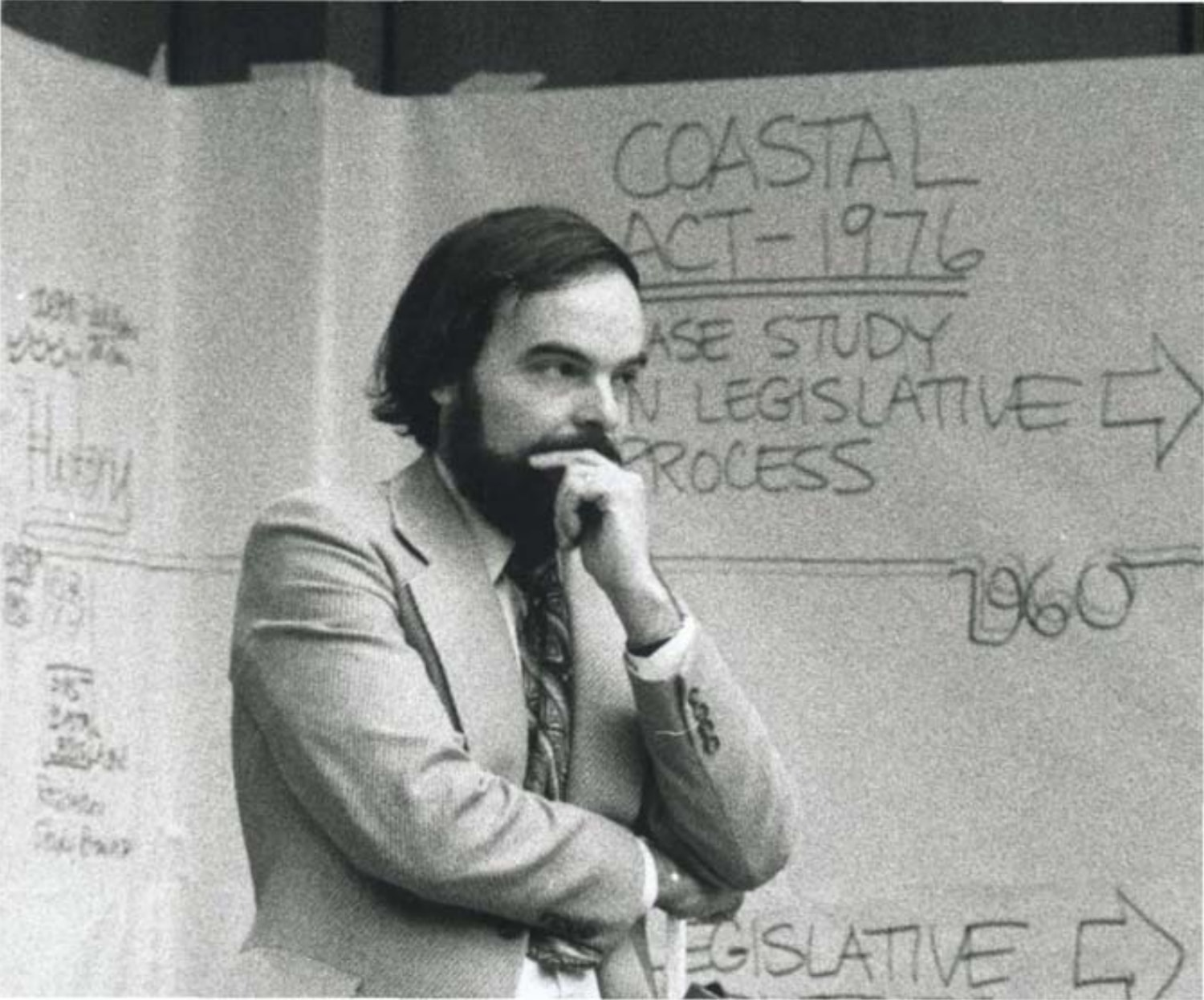
Peter M. Douglas in 1976

In 2005, the commission found Dennis Schneider's proposed 10,000 sq ft (930 m^{2}) home in San Luis Obispo to be inconsistent with the California Coastal Act. The commission ruled that Schneider could still build a new home, but with 15 conditions including: his house must be reduced to 5,000 sq ft (460 m^{2}), the house must be moved 300 ft (91 m) inland, and his barn cannot be built because 41 acres (17 ha) is too small for ranching cattle. Several of the conditions were targeted at preserving the character of the view that a boater would have of the coastline from offshore. While commission Executive Director Peter M. Douglas said "the view of pastoral areas from the sea to the land without human structures intervening is very important," the California 2nd District Court of Appeal ruled in a unanimous 2006 opinion: "We believe that it is unreasonable to assume that the Legislature has ever sought to protect the occasional boater's views of the coastline at the expense of a coastal landowner."

In 2008, studies showed seabirds on offshore rocks abandoned their nests after Fourth of July fireworks celebrations in Gualala. Commission executive director Peter Douglas said the fireworks organizer, the Gualala Festivals Committee, simply refused to work with the commission. The commission sent a cease and desist order banning the fireworks, and a judge in Ukiah rejected a request to delay the commission's ruling. Douglas explained "Our job under the coastal act is to protect marine resources, and that's what is affected here. We don't get involved in 95 percent of the fireworks displays along the coast because most of them don't have these impacts."

Since 2008, the commission, the California state government, and Vinod Khosla have engaged in litigation over reopening a public pathway through Khosla's property to Martin's Beach. Khosla offered to sell a portion of his property to create a pathway for $30 million.

In 2015, the commission approved a construction project for SeaWorld San Diego to build a bigger tank for their killer whales including the condition that they must not breed captive whales to fill them.

In 2020, a commission investigation found the city of Long Beach guilty of pruning palm trees that contained more than one Heron bird nest. One fledgling bird, which later died, was found on the ground in the vicinity of the arborists' work. Proposed penalties include planting trees, more tree-trimming oversight, and fines.
