= Alice Ehlers =

Austrian harpsichordist

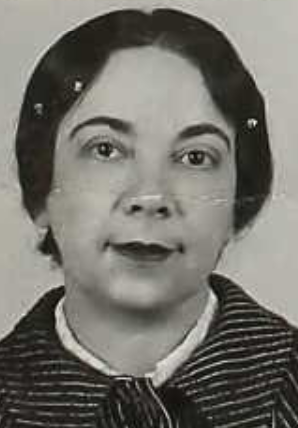
- Alice Ehlers, from paperwork submitted to the United States Department of Justice in 1941
- Born: Alice Pulai; April 16, 1887; Vienna, Austria-Hungary
- Died: March 1, 1981; Redondo Beach, California, U.S.
- Occupation(s): Harpsichordist, music teacher
- Relatives: Peter M. Douglas (grandson)

Alice Ehlers (April 16, 1887 – March 1, 1981), born Alice Pulay, was an Austrian-born American harpsichordist and college professor.

== Early life and education ==
Alice Pulay (or Pulai) was born in Vienna, the daughter of Ignaz Pulay and Karoline Pulay. Her family was Jewish. She studied piano with Theodor Leschetizky, music theory with Arnold Schoenberg, and harpsichord with Wanda Landowska in Berlin.

== Career ==
Ehlers was considered a skilled interpreter of baroque music, especially the works of Bach. Despite the difficulties of touring with a harpsichord, she toured in Palestine, Russia, and South America; she moved to England in 1933, and then to the United States in 1938, to escape Nazi Germany. She appeared in the 1939 film adaptation of Wuthering Heights, in which she plays "an acerbic rendition" of Mozart's Rondo alla Turca on a double-manual harpsichord during a party scene. She made a number of recordings on the Decca label in 1939.

Beginning in 1941, Ehlers was a professor of harpsichord at the University of Southern California. She founded the Southern California Junior Bach Festival. Malcolm Hamilton, Marilyn Horne, Michael Tilson Thomas, Carol Neblett, and Roger Wagner were among her students. In 1954, she was appointed the Walker-Ames Lecturer in Music at the University of Washington. In 1961, she was named the Brittingham Professor of Music at the University of Wisconsin.

She performed in concerts and recitals into her eighties. In 1948 and 1949, she performed with Frieda Belinfante and Virginia Majewski in Los Angeles. In 1952 she gave recitals with violinist Alex Murray. She toured in the American midwest in 1957. She gave concerts of baroque music with violist Eva Heinitz in 1949 and 1961.

Ehlers was a friend and correspondent of Albert Schweitzer. She gave benefit performances to raise funds for Schweitzer's medical work in Africa.

== Personal life and legacy ==
Ehlers married Alfred Walter Georg Ehlers in Berlin in 1910; they had two daughters, Maria and Christina, and later divorced. Ehlers died in 1981, in Redondo Beach, California, at the age of 93. Her grandson, environmentalist Peter M. Douglas, traced some of his worldview to Ehlers's reverence for life and pacifism. Recordings and transcripts of interviews she gave in 1965 and 1966 are held in special collections at UCLA.

Some of her letters from Albert Schweitzer were donated to Chapman University. They were translated and published in 1991. In 1997, a stage adaptation of her letters with Albert Schweitzer was produced at Chapman University.
