= Granite Construction =

American Construction Firm

Coordinates: 36.905447°N 121.766800°W

Granite Construction Incorporated
- Type: Public
- Traded as: NYSE: GVA; S&P 600 component
- Industry: Engineering; Construction; Quarries
- Founded: 1922
- Headquarters: Watsonville, California, U.S.
- Key people: Kyle Larkin (President & CEO); Staci Woolsey (CFO)
- Revenue: ▲$4.4 billion (2025)
- Net income: ▲US$193 million (2025)
- Number of employees: 6,400 (2025)
- Website: graniteconstruction.com

Granite Construction Inc. is a civil construction company and aggregate producer, a member of the S&P 600 Index based and founded in Watsonville, California, and is the parent corporation of Granite Construction Company. The company is both a heavy civil construction contractor and construction aggregate manufacturer, owning or leasing quarries in several Western states for extracting mostly sands, gravel, and crushed stone products.

Granite Construction Company is composed of a construction materials division, and three construction operating divisions (California Group, Mountain Group and Central Group). Under each group are numerous regional offices, quarries, asphalt and concrete plants. Granite's California Group comprises five regions, based on geographically limited areas within the state. Granite's Central Group comprises six regions, representing states and specific markets outside of California: Arizona, Texas, Florida, Illinois, and Federal Division based in Colorado. Granite's Mountain Group comprises five regions, representing states and specific markets in Alaska, Washington, Oregon, Idaho, Nevada, Utah and the Water/Mineral Division.

Granite Construction works in both public and private sector transportation infrastructure projects that include: roads and highways, bridges, dams, water reservoirs, railroads, seaports, and airports. The materials division produces construction materials such as sand, gravel, ready-mix and asphalt concrete.

As of 2022, Granite was ranked 28th on ENR's Top 400 Contractors (by overall revenue), dropping from 25th in 2021.

== History ==
Granite Construction was established in 1922 as a construction division of Graniterock following the expansion of the company after World War I. The company would be head by Walter J. Wilkinson, Graniterock's superintendent of construction.

Throughout the late 1920s and 1930s, the company fell into financial hardship from the Wall Street crash of 1929 and the following Great Depression. In lieu of the failing economy, Congress began a series of projects to help the construction industry. In the 1930s, the company began work on the first roads into Yosemite National Park, specifically the road to Glacier Point.

By World War II, the company began focusing on building housing and paving airstrips for military use. The war significantly aided the company through its financial struggles. The 1940s saw Granite's total work volume exceeded $17 million. In 1945 and 1946, the company opened offices in Monterey, California and Santa Cruz, California.

In 1955, Granite won the contract to pave Highway 99 near Elk Grove, California. Later, the company acquired the Perkins Quarry and American Sand & Gravel, further strengthening its reach throughout Northern California. The later years of the 1950s saw Granite Construction prepare Lake Tahoe for the first Winter Olympic Games in the Western US. They worked with other builders to establish sections of Interstate 80.

Granite Construction Incorporated became publicly traded in 1990 and throughout the decade, would continue to acquire more businesses and establish more branches. The company expanded into Utah and Florida through its acquisitions.

The company was under investigation from the SEC from 2019 to 2021 for misrepresenting revenue, and as a result paid fines to settle disputes with shareholders, and avoided delisting from the NYSE.
