= 1924 California Proposition 7 =

Boxing and wrestling contests

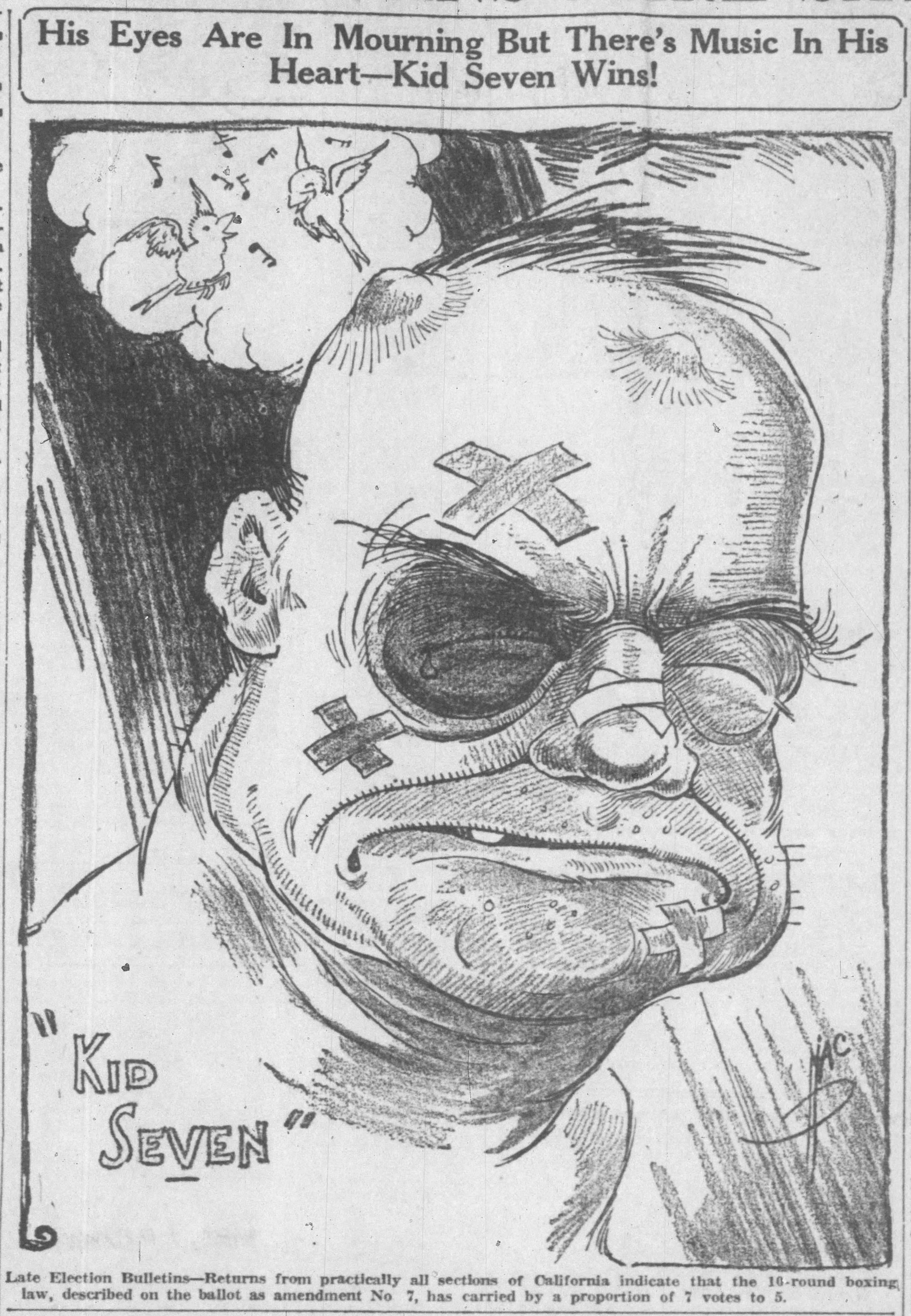
"Kid Seven Wins!" (Los Angeles Evening Record, November 5, 1924)

California Proposition 7 was a 1924 California ballot initiative regarding the status of boxing and wrestling contests in the state. The measure passed with 51 percent of the popular vote. The measure legalized prize fights and established the California State Athletic Commission to regulate boxing.

The law permitted "10-round decision bouts and 12-round no decision bouts in California, under the supervision of a state boxing and wrestling commission, appointed by the governor." The law went into effect beginning approximately February 1925. Prior to the passage of the 1924 boxing bill, "The original state Constitution outlawed prize fighting. Later amateur boxing was allowed. Professional bouts occurred anyway, but underground."

== See also ==
- 1914 California Proposition 20
