= Environmentally Sensitive Habitat Areas =

Designated protective area in California

An Environmentally Sensitive Habitat Area (ESHA - pronounced ē'-sha) is a designated protective area within the Coastal Zone of California, United States, as described in the California Coastal Act and Certified Local Coastal Programs for local government. An example of an ESHA location is Oceano Dunes.
