= Peter M. Douglas =

Executive Director of California Coastal Commission

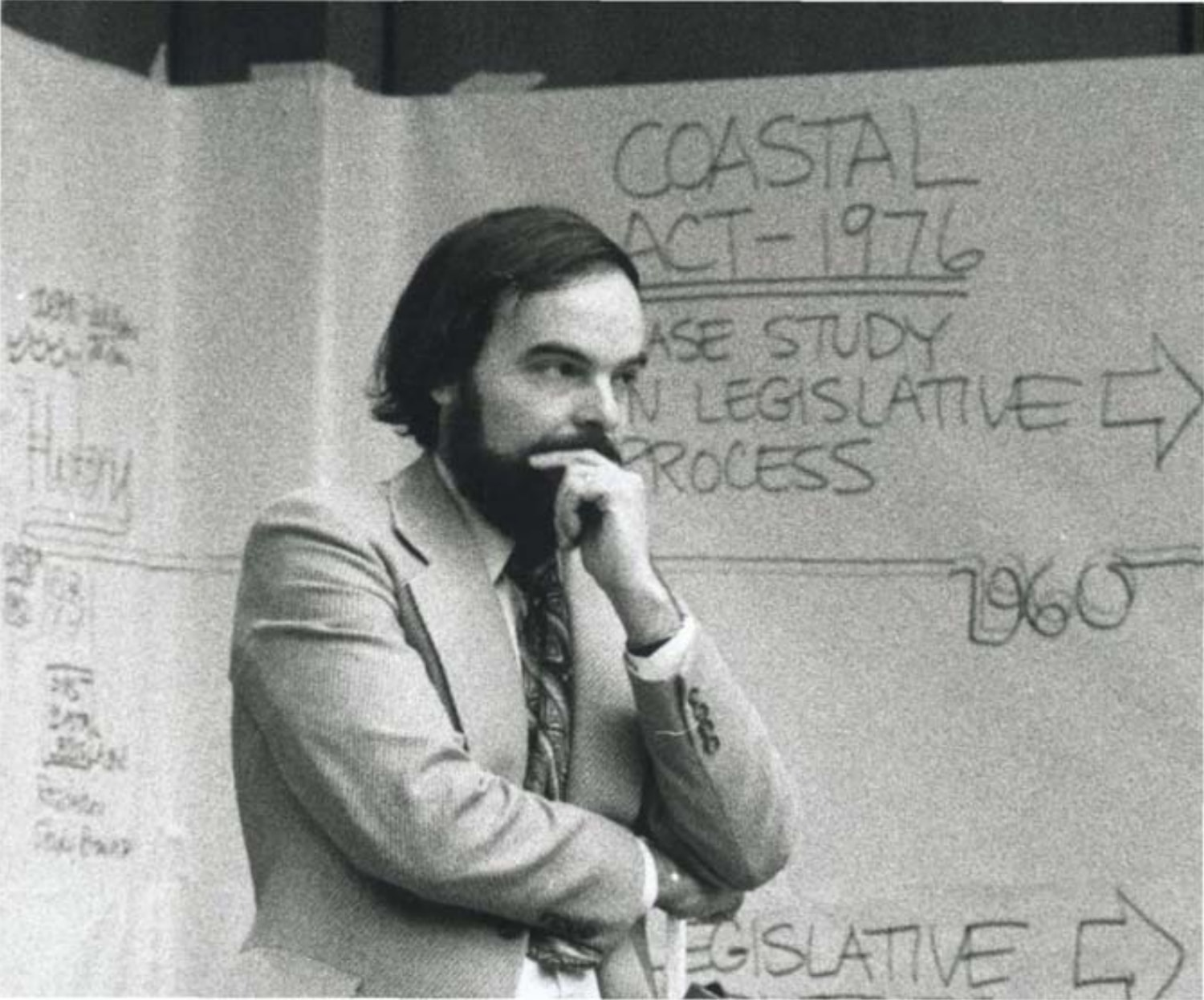
- Douglas in 1976

Executive Director of the California Coastal Commission
- In office 1977–2012

Peter M. Douglas (August 22, 1942 – April 1, 2012) was an environmental activist, UCLA law graduate, and principal author of Proposition 20, an initiative in 1972 that created the California Coastal Commission. He served as its executive director for 26 years. He was also co-author of the 1976 Coastal Act.

== Early life ==
Douglas was born Peter Michael Ehlers in Berlin on August 22, 1942. At the age of two his family's home was destroyed by Allied planes during the bombing of Berlin. After WWII he immigrated to the United States in 1950 with his mother and sister, and changed his last name upon becoming an American citizen. His grandmother was harpsichordist Alice Ehlers.

As a young man he enjoyed surfing off Redondo Beach and camping in the desert and mountains of Southern California.

He studied in California and Germany. He earned an undergraduate degree in psychology and a graduate degree in law at UCLA, where he focused on antiwar and social justice movements and co-founded a law collective. He also studied abroad for one year in Germany. After completing his law degree in 1969, he and his German-born wife, Rotraut, then moved abroad for a few years. He was not yet focused on environmentalism.

== Career ==
He returned to the U.S. in 1971 and accepted a job in Sacramento on the staff of then-Assemblyman Alan Sieroty, a Democrat from Los Angeles, who put him in charge of writing laws protecting the state's coastline.

He was the main author of laws Proposition 20 in 1972 and the 1976 Coastal Act, which created and made permanent the California Coastal Commission. Later for 26 years he was executive director of the commission, the regulatory agency he helped create.

He fought the development of homes, industry, and infrastructure in California. He considered among the commission's most significant achievements defeating a proposed toll road skirting San Onofre State Beach, a liquefied natural gas terminal off the Ventura County coast and the development of Hearst Ranch. He considered the decision to allow housing subdivisions along the Bolsa Chica wetlands one of its worst failures. Douglas's work helped keep one of the world's most beautiful coastlines largely undeveloped.

In 2006, two years after recovering from Stage 4 cancer, Douglas told the New York Times he set a match to a pile of dead leaves he had poured gasoline onto, igniting an explosion that sent him flying. He recovered from the serious burns that resulted. One of his most lasting statements about the coast is. "The coast is never saved, it is always being saved."

== Death ==
Douglas died of lung and throat cancer on April 1, 2012, at the home of his sister in La Quinta, California.
