= 1922 California Proposition 20 =

Approved Osteopathic Initiatives Act

Proposition 20, also known as the Osteopathic Initiatives Act, was a California initiated state statute proposed and passed in 1922 to allow for the creation of a state board of osteopathic examiners. Proposition 20 passed with 439,775 Yes votes, representing 57.29 percent of the total votes cast. On the same day, voters approved a similar health care reform, Proposition 16, which allowed for the creation of a state board of chiropractic examiners.

== Official summary ==
- Allowed for the creation of the Osteopathic Medical Board of California.
- Allowed for five board members appointed by the governor and staggered to three year terms.
- Required board-approved institutions to have at minimum 4000 hours of classroom time for a "Physician and Surgeon certificate".
- Authorized osteopathic board to carry out provisions set in the Medical Practice Act of 1913.

== Results of vote ==
Proposition 20
Choice	Votes	%
For	439,775	57.29
Against	327,819	42.71
Total	767,594	100.00
Source: 1922 Statement of Vote at General Election

Results by county: Yes: 70–80%; 60–70%; 50–60%; No: 70–80%; 60–70%; 50–60%

== Outcomes ==
In 1962, various California medical and osteopathic associations created an amendment to Proposition 20 to repeal the power granted to the osteopathic state board in lieu of the proposed merger between the two professions. This amendment, known as Proposition 22, was the legal continuation of the merger already underway to combine the osteopathic and medical licensing boards to reduce redundancy as the two professions became more similar to each other.
