= California Coastal Commission v. Granite Rock Co. =

- Supreme Court of the United States

Argued December 2, 1986 Decided March 24, 1987
- Full case name: California Coastal Commission v. Granite Rock Co.
- Citations: 480 U.S. 572 (more) 107 S. Ct. 1419; 94 L. Ed. 2d 577

Case history
- Prior: Case dismissed, Granite Rock Co. v. Calif. Coastal Comm'n, 590 F. Supp. 1361 (N.D. Cal. 1984); reversed, 768 F.2d 1077 (9th Cir. 1985).

Holding
- A state may require an unpatented mining claim in a national forest within the coastal zone to be reviewed by the state's coastal agency.

Court membership
- Chief Justice William Rehnquist Associate Justices William J. Brennan Jr. · Byron White; Thurgood Marshall · Harry Blackmun; Lewis F. Powell Jr. · John P. Stevens; Sandra Day O'Connor · Antonin Scalia

Case opinions
- Majority: O'Connor, joined by Rehnquist, Brennan, Marshall, Blackmun, Powell, and Stevens
- Concur/dissent: Powell, joined by Stevens
- Dissent: Scalia, joined by White

Laws applied
- Article Four of the United States Constitution

California Coastal Commission v. Granite Rock Co., 480 U.S. 572 (1987), is a United States Supreme Court case addressing the question of whether United States Forest Service regulations, federal land use statutes and regulations, or the Coastal Zone Management Act of 1972, preempt the California Coastal Commission's imposition of a permit requirement on operation of an unpatented mining claim in a national forest. The court ruled that even if federal land is not included in the Coastal Zone Management Act's interpretation of "coastal zone," the act does not automatically preempt all state regulation of activities on federal lands.

== Facts ==
Granite Rock Company of Watsonville, California purchased the property and mineral rights to a large deposit of white limestone on Mount Pico Blanco in the Los Padres National Forest on the Big Sur coast of California in 1963. The limestone deposit is made up of two large, pharmaceutical grade limestone bodies known as the Pico Blanco body and the Hayfield body. It is the only high-grade deposit on the Pacific Coast outside Alaska within three miles of potential marine transportation. Reserves have been estimated to be from 600 million to a billion tons, reportedly the largest in California, and the largest west of the Rocky Mountains.

In 1980, Granite Rock submitted to the Forest Service a five-year plan to remove substantial amounts of limestone from a quarry on the south face of Pico Blanco within the National Forest boundary. The Forest Service prepared an Environmental Assessment of the plan and recommended some modifications, which Granite Rock implemented. When Graniterock obtained the permit in 1983, it began to excavate a 5-acre (2.0 ha) open pit mine. The California Coastal Commission required Granite Rock to apply for a coastal development permit for any mining undertaken after the date of notification.

The Coastal Commission did not seek to prohibit mining of the unpatented claim, only to regulate mining activity in accordance with the detailed requirements of the California Coastal Act. Granite Rock filed an action in U.S. District Court claiming that the Coastal Commission permit requirement was preempted by Forest Service regulations, by the Mining Act of 1872, and by the Coastal Zone Management Act. The District Court denied Granite Rock's motion for summary judgment, and dismissed the action. The Court of Appeals for the Ninth Circuit reversed the lower court's decision, holding that the Coastal Commission permit requirement was preempted by the Mining Act of 1872 and Forest Service regulations.

The California Coastal Commission appealed to the Supreme Court of the United States. The state sought to change the division of power between the federal government and the states over control of land-use decisions. California sought to enforce stricter state standards over mining operations on federal land. It was joined in its appeal by nine other Western states, including Arizona, Utah, Montana, New Mexico and Wyoming. California sought a ruling on the constitutionality of the 1872 mining law that made it impossible to enforce state environmental standards.

Granite Rock argued that the Property Clause not only vests unlimited power in Congress over the use of federally owned lands, but also exempts federal lands from state regulation, whether or not those regulations conflict with federal law.

== Opinion ==
The Supreme Court previously held that "the State is free to enforce its criminal and civil laws" on federal land so long as those laws do not conflict with federal law. The court held that because Congress specifically disclaimed any intention to preempt preexisting state authority in the Coastal Zone Management Act, even if all federal lands are excluded from the Coastal Zone Management Act definition of "coastal zone", the act does not automatically preempt all state regulation of activities on federal lands. They ruled in favor of the Coastal Commission.

== Results ==
Although Granite Rock's five-year plan of operations had expired by the time the case reached the Supreme Court, it still had the right to reapply for a Forest Service permit and request review of the permit by the Coastal Commission. It did not reapply and has not indicated if it will. It still owns the land.
