= 1922 California Proposition 16 =

Chiropractic Initiatives Act

Proposition 16, also known as the Chiropractic Initiatives Act, was a California initiated state statute proposed and passed in 1922 to allow for the creation of a state board of chiropractic examiners. Proposition 16 passed with 481,600 Yes votes, representing 59.5 percent of the total votes cast. On the same day, voters approved a similar health care reform, Proposition 20, which allowed for the creation of a state board of osteopathic examiners.

At the time of the vote, 22 states had already passed laws similar to Proposition 16.

== Official summary ==
- Allowed for the creation of the California Board of Chiropractic Examiners with members appointed by the governor and paid for from receipts under the act.
- Prohibited the practice of chiropractic without a license from a board-approved institution.
- Required board-approved institutions to have at minimum 2400 hours of classroom time with minimum hourly requirements for set topics
- Allowed for the state board to revoke a chiropractic license

== Results of vote ==
Proposition 16
Choice	Votes	%
For	481,600	59.50
Against	327,849	40.50
Total	809,449	100.00
Source: 1922 Statement of Vote at General Election

Results by county: Yes: 70–80%; 60–70%; 50–60%; No: 70–80%; 60–70%; 50–60%
