= 1972 California Proposition 20 =

Approved initiative that established the California Coastal Commission

November 7, 1972
- Coastal Zone Conservation Act

Results
Choice	Votes	%
Yes	4,363,375	55.15%
No	3,548,180	44.85%

California Proposition 20, officially the California Proposition 20, Coastal Initiative Collection, was an initiated state statute on the ballot in the state of California on November 7, 1972. It was approved by 55% of the Californian population, and disapproved by 45% of the Californian population. As a result, Proposition 20 passed, by a margin of 10% (c. 800,000 votes), thus establishing the California Coastal Commission (CCC). However, it wouldn't be until 1976 that it was formally passed into law by the California State Senate through the adoption of the California Coastal Act of 1976. The establishment of the CCC ensured the protection of the Californian coastline from being subject to mass-urbanization and industrialization, as well as ensuring public access to the many beaches along the coast.

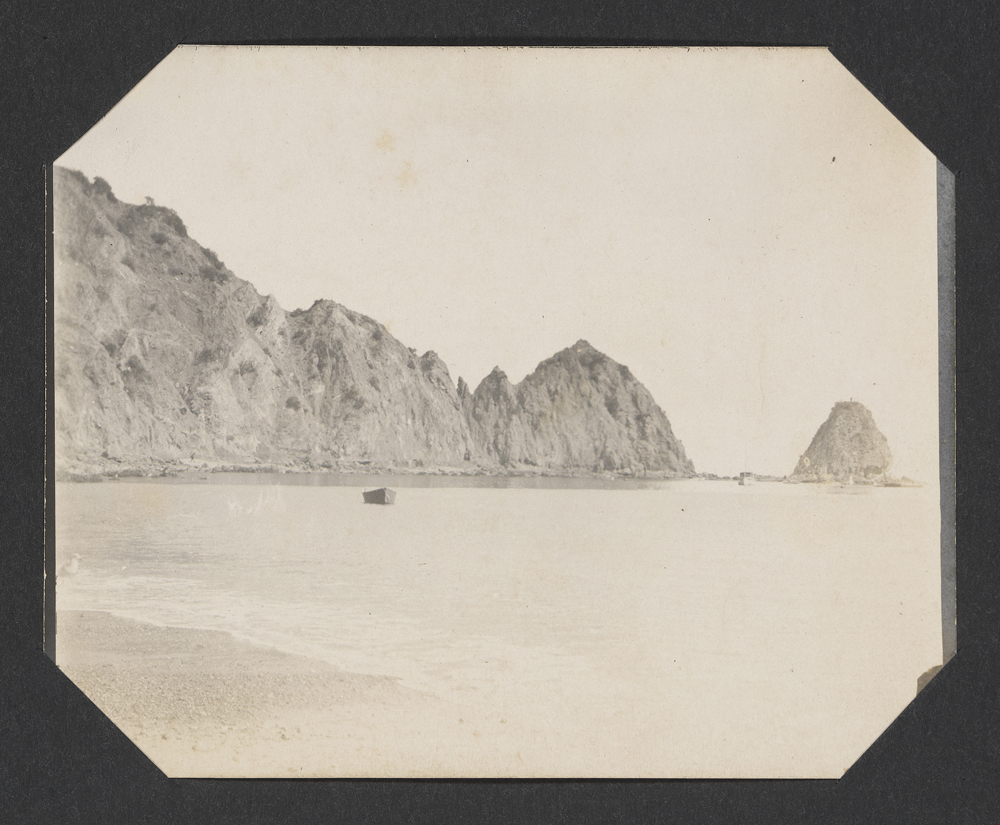
California coast in 1902
