= Malcolm Hamilton (harpsichordist) =

Malcolm Hamilton (1932 – November 17, 2003) was a harpsichordist. He was born in Victoria, British Columbia, Canada. He studied harpsichord at the University of Washington in Seattle and then taught piano and harpsichord at the University of Southern California for 30 years. Hamilton performed in many recitals and for the Los Angeles Chamber Orchestra, which he co-founded, under conductors Neville Marriner and Gerard Schwarz.

Hamilton died on November 17, 2003, of congestive heart failure. He had lived in Laguna Niguel, California, with his partner, David Thomas, for 43 years.
