= Estoppel certificate =

Document used in real estate activity

An estoppel certificate (or estoppel letter) is a document commonly used in due diligence in real estate and mortgage activities. It is based on estoppel, the legal principle that prevents or estops someone from claiming a change in the agreement later on. It is used in a variety of countries for commercial and residential transactions. It is a document often completed, but at least signed, by a tenant used in their landlord's proposed transaction with a third party. A mortgage lender intending to collateralize a tenant-occupied property or a purchaser intending to purchase such a property will often want to verify certain representations made by the landlord.

An estoppel certificate provides confirmation by the tenant of the terms of the rental agreement, such as the amount of rent, the amount of security deposit and the expiration of the agreement. Further, the estoppel certificate may give the opportunity to the tenant to explain if they may have any claims against the landlord, which may affect a buyer's or lender's decision to complete the proposed transaction.

Some lease agreements require the tenant to complete such a certificate or to waive their responses by allowing the landlord to complete the estoppel certificate under certain circumstances.

If the language in the lease so provides, a tenant can be in default under a lease after failing to comply with a request from the landlord for an estoppel certificate. The majority of commercial leases include a provision establishing the requirements for the provision of a tenant estoppel certificate following the landlord's request, especially if commercial lending is set to take place.

- The appropriateness of the statements in a tenant estoppel certificate depends largely on four factors:
- The estoppel certificate requirements in the lease.
- The overall bargaining power and leverage of the tenant.
- The project and the financing type of financing planned.

(Source:
