= 1914 California Proposition 20 =

Prize fights initiative

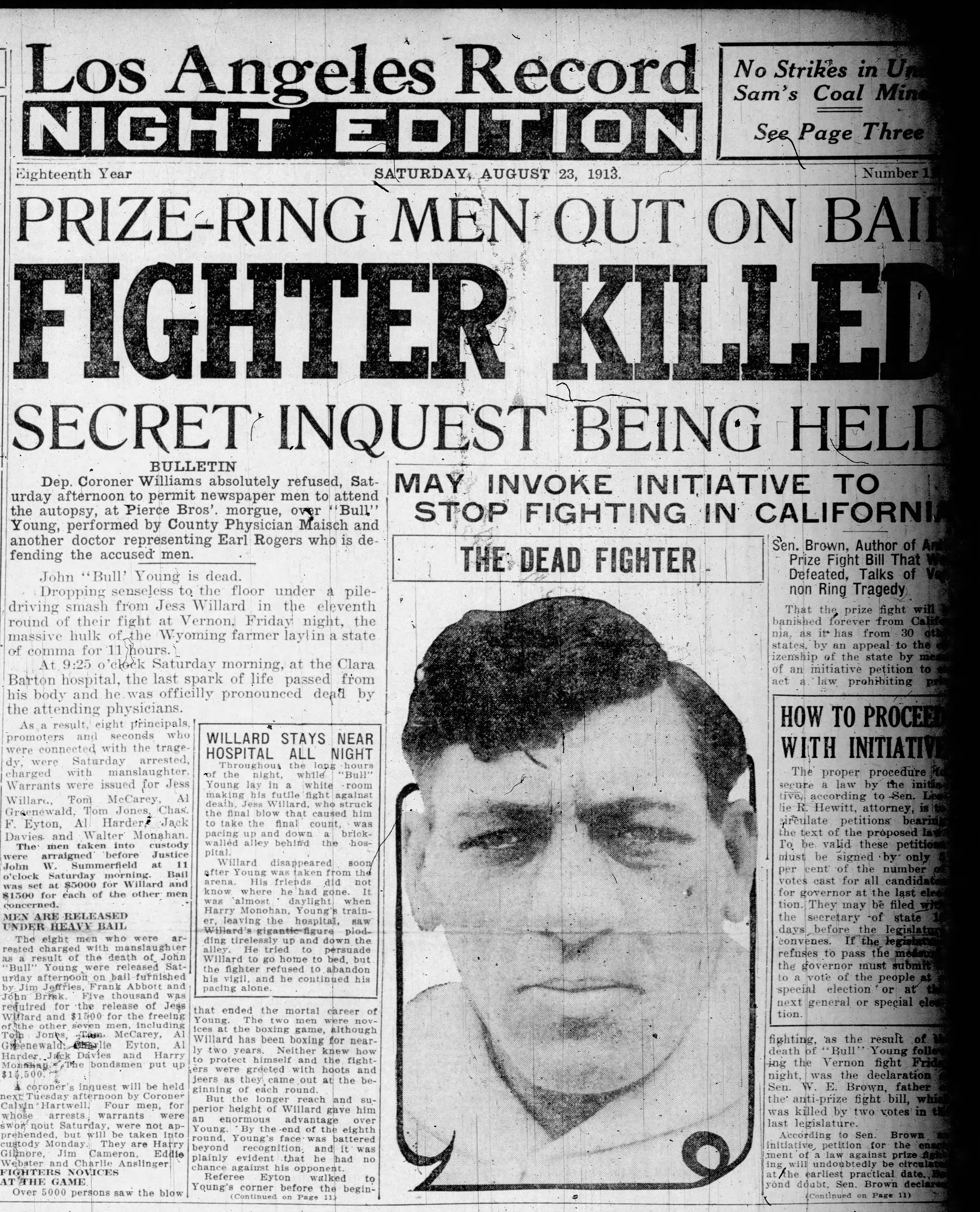
The law was proposed after Bull Young was killed by a blow from Jess Willard at Vernon Arena, in the 11th round of what was intended to be 20-round fight (Los Angeles Record, August 23, 1913)

California Proposition 20 was a 1914 California ballot initiative known as the prize fights initiative. It passed with 56 percent of the popular vote.

The prize fight initiative addressed the question of "irreligious prize fights" (as per proponents) versus "moral boxing" (according to opponents). It prohibited charging an admission fee for any fight lasting more than four rounds, and prohibited awarding any prize worth more than $25. The wording on the ballot was "Initiative act amending penal code. Prohibits the engaging in or furthering in any prize fights or remunerative boxing exhibitions, training therefor, or betting thereon; the conducting, participating in or witnessing any boxing exhibition on Memorial Day or Sunday; authorizes regulated four-round amateur boxing exhibitions unless prohibited by ordinances [etc]."

An Oakland sportswriter named Billy Fitz argued that the limitations imposed by the law, restricting fights (that had once gone on as many as 20 rounds) to four rounds would encourage a rush of poorly trained amateurs who would fight more brutally in order to win a shorter match (rather than previous endurance contests which he felt were conducted by well-prepared professional boxers).

The 1914 law was repealed with the passage of 1924's California Proposition 7.
