= Graniterock =

Construction company in Watsonville, California, US

Graniterock Company
- Type: Private
- Industry: Construction
- Founded: 1900
- Headquarters: Watsonville, California
- Key people: Peter Lemon, President & CEO
- Number of employees: 650
- Website: www.graniterock.com

Graniterock is a US corporation, founded in 1900 as "Granite Rock", and based in Watsonville, California. It operates in the construction industry providing crushed gravel, sand, concrete, asphalt and paving services.

== History ==
=== Beginnings ===
Granite Rock Company was founded on February 14, 1900 by Arthur Roberts (A.R.) Wilson and Warren R. Porter. Wilson was born in San Francisco in 1866, graduated from MIT with the class of 1890, and returned to California where he partnered with Kimball G. Easton in a Bay Area street paving and construction firm known as Easton and Wilson. Easton's brother-in-law, Warren Porter, was a well connected Santa Cruz County banker, lumberman, and politician.

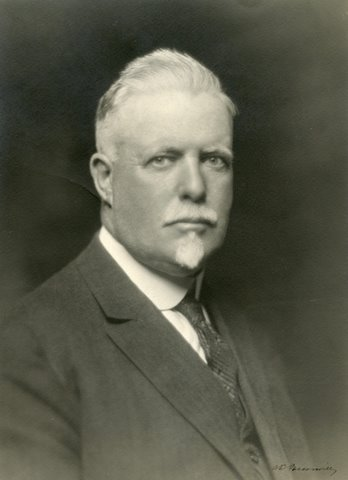
Arthur Roberts Wilson, circa 1920

A small granite quarry on Judge Logan's ranch east of Watsonville supplied rock for construction of the Southern Pacific Railroad (SP) for several years before it was acquired by Porter's bank in 1899. SP named the quarry spur at railroad milepost 93.2 Logan, after the ranch owner. The quarry on the San Andreas Fault minimized drilling and blasting costs by mining rock broken by fault movement. Smaller particles of construction aggregate were obtained close to the fault, and coarser material was more distant from the fault trace. Porter and Wilson saw its possibilities, found some additional investors, and started up the business with Wilson as Superintendent. In the beginning, quarry operations were tough; fifteen men used sledgehammers, picks, shovels and wheelbarrows to break and load broken rock onto horse-drawn wagons for the trip to the railroad line. Relief came in 1903 when the quarry was automated with Corliss steam engine-powered McCully crusher No.3. It produced 20 tons of 2½-inch rock per hour. Crushing capacity was increased by 35 tons per hour in 1904 by crusher No.5 powered by an oil-fired Atlas tandem compound steam engine. Rock was transported from the quarry face to the crushing plant in horse-drawn, side-dump rail cars, which were loaded manually. There were about 24 men working at the quarry.

The 1906 San Francisco earthquake flattened the new steam crushing plant and temporarily halted operations. Rail operations were disrupted, and the quarry operation was devastated. The earthquake's destruction created a demand for construction. In the following years, Granite Rock Company supplied materials for a number of buildings in San Francisco and around the Monterey Bay area. Among those still standing are the old Gilroy City Hall and the old San Francisco Wells Fargo Building. At the quarry in Aromas, California, expansion was taking place. Demand for materials allowed purchase of a Marion Steam Shovel in 1909 for loading quarry cars. A second Marion shovel was purchased in 1911 with a larger rock crusher capable of producing 175 tons per hour. The older crushers were converted to electric power and five narrow-gauge railway steam locomotives were purchased to move broken rock from the quarry face to the steam crusher over 5 miles (8.0 km) of quarry tracks.

With the advent of automobiles, street paving became a necessity. Granite Rock Company received its first contract for placement of water-bond macadam on Lake Avenue in Watsonville, from Walker Street to the northeast city limits. The total contract, including grading and gutters, amounted to $18,000. In 1915, the California State Legislature passed the "Get Out of the Mud Act", a bill encouraging the modernization of streets. Over the next few years, some streets in Santa Cruz and Salinas were paved with Granite Rock Company concrete. At San Francisco's Panama Pacific Exhibition in 1915, Granite Rock Company won the Gold Ribbon for excellence in crushed rock.

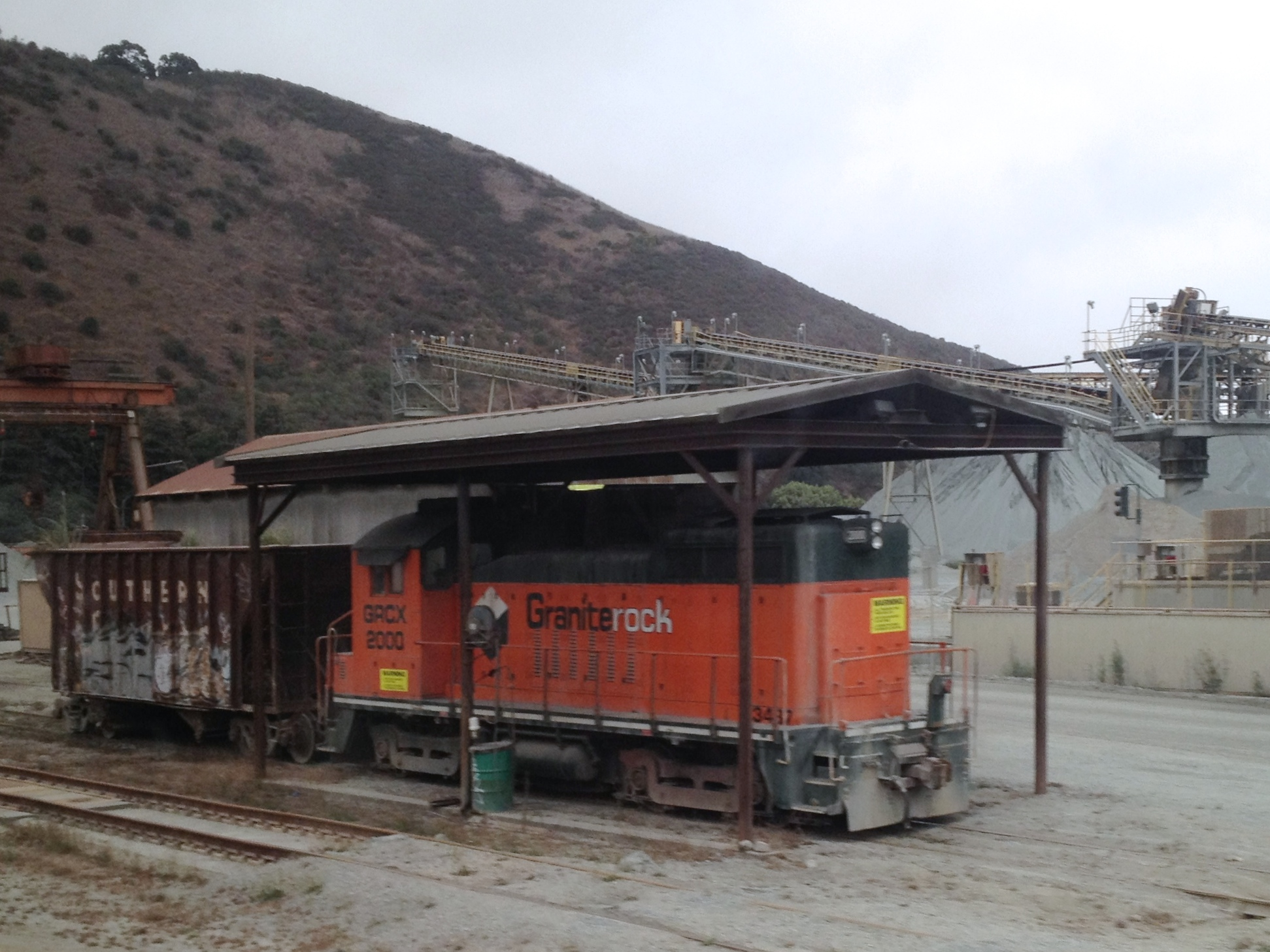
Graniterock Diesel locomotive and hopper car in Aromas, California

As World War I increased freight costs, local plants were developed so rock could be sold in small truck lots. Granite Rock Company built bunkers along the SP railroad from South San Francisco to San Luis Obispo to supply local construction businesses. Construction was booming throughout California, and the Company expanded with the state's needs. In 1916, a 5-mile (8.0 km) railroad with fills as high as 90 feet (27 m) was built to Southern California's Doheny oil fields. Granite men and machinery, including two of the narrow-gauge locomotives and 20 quarry cars, went south to do the work in Casmalia, California. In 1918, Granite Rock Company built the highway connecting Castroville with Moss Landing. Among the builders was author John Steinbeck. Granite supplied thousands of tons of rock fill to stabilize the SP line crossing the saturated alluvium of Elkhorn Slough.

=== Rail operations ===
A standard-gauge railway locomotive was purchased in 1920 to shunt railcars on the lower quarry level near the SP rail line. The narrow-gauge steam locomotives last operated in 1948, and dump trucks replaced the last narrow-gauge rail lines by 1961. More standard-gauge cars and locomotives were purchased; and 4.82 miles (7.76 km) of standard-gauge company tracks remained operational in 1976. The following locomotives have been operated:

Number	Builder	Wheel arrangement	Built	Works number	Gauge	Notes
1	Porter	0-4-0 Tank locomotive	4/1911	4853	36 inches (91 cm)	purchased new
2	Porter	0-4-0 Tank locomotive	4/1913	5309	36 inches (91 cm)	purchased new
3	Porter	0-4-0 Tank locomotive	3/1914	5374	36 inches (91 cm)	purchased new
4	Porter	0-4-0 Tank locomotive	1/1916	5408	36 inches (91 cm)	purchased new
5	Porter	0-4-0 Tank locomotive	8/1920	6538	standard	purchased new
6	Porter	0-6-0	4/1928	7097	standard	purchased new
7	Plymouth	B	2/1930	3414	36 inches (91 cm)	125 horsepower (93 kW) gasoline model JLB purchased new
8	ALCO (Rogers)	0-4-0	1/1913	51694	36 inches (91 cm)	built as Old Mission Portland Cement #1 San Juan Bautista, California
9	ALCO (Schenectady)	0-4-0 Tank locomotive	1907	44390	standard	built as American Smelter #335; purchased 1939
10	Porter	0-6-0	8/1942	7461	standard	built as United States Army #5001; purchased 1947
11	GE Transportation	B-B	7/1951	30956	standard	purchased new

=== Changes ===
In 1922, the first of a number of important business changes took place. Warren Porter had suffered financial losses in a speculative venture with the Java Coconut Oil Company, which took over his interest in the company. A.R. Wilson later purchased this stock, and became majority shareholder and president. Also that year, Wilson started Granite Construction Company as a separate entity and became its first president. In 1924, Wilson started Central Supply Company, which distributed building materials. Granite Rock Company remained the producer of rock and sand products for construction projects and materials sales.

Just before the Stock Market Crash of 1929, A.R. Wilson died from a sudden heart attack. His wife Anna assumed presidency of the company and his son Jeff took over as General Manager.

Granite Rock Company business declined through the Great Depression. Work was so scarce at the quarry that a whistle was blown to call men in when as little as one car of rock was ordered. The board of directors had to ask permission from the Federal Reserve Bank in order to give Christmas bonuses. The company made interest free loans to employees to cover medical bills when unable to offer regular employment. The Wilson family sold its interest in Granite Construction Company to Walter Wilkinson and Bert Scott in 1936. South San Francisco, San Jose and San Luis Obispo branches of Central Supply Company were also sold.

=== Progress ===
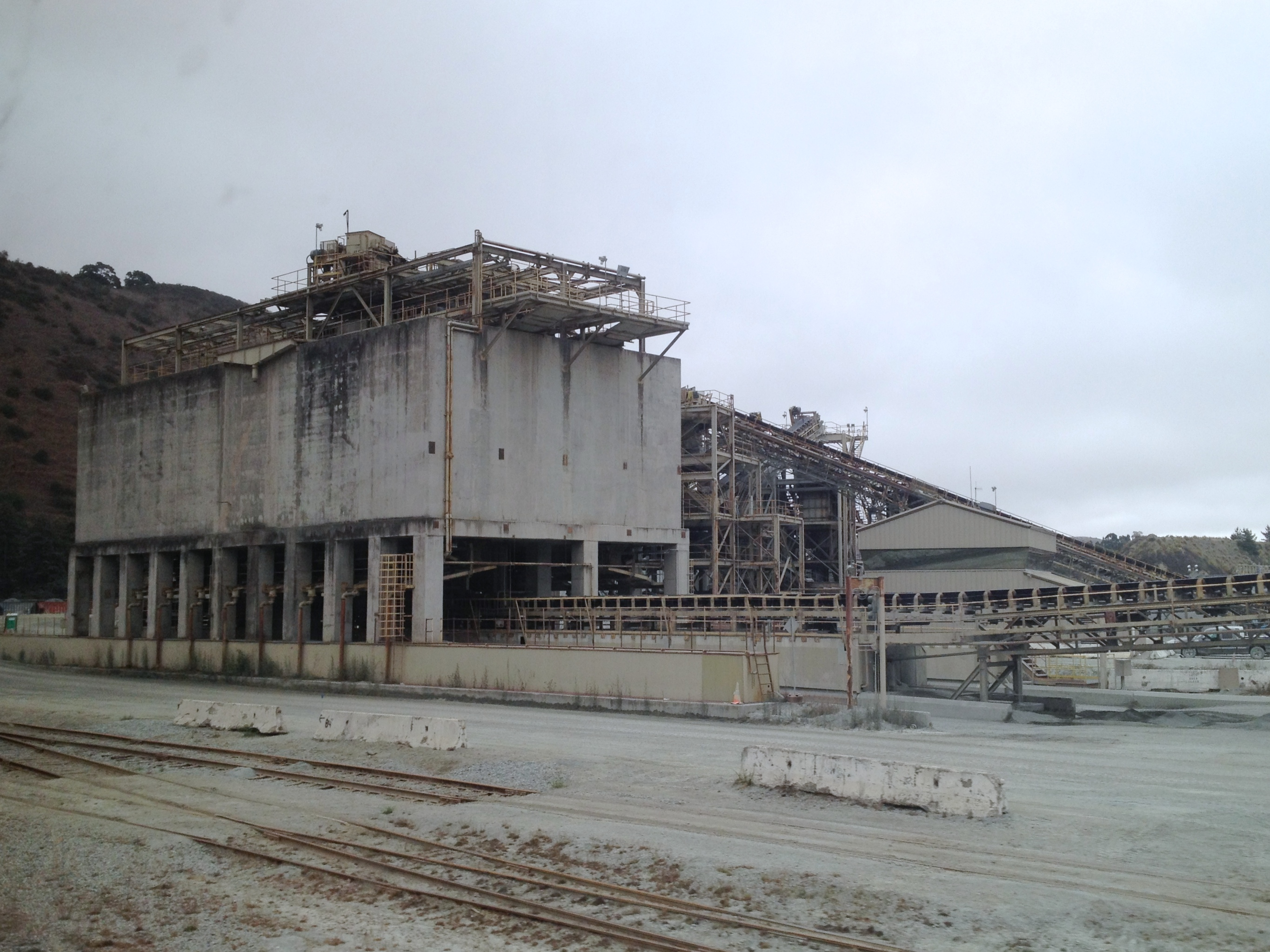
At the Aromas quarry in 2013

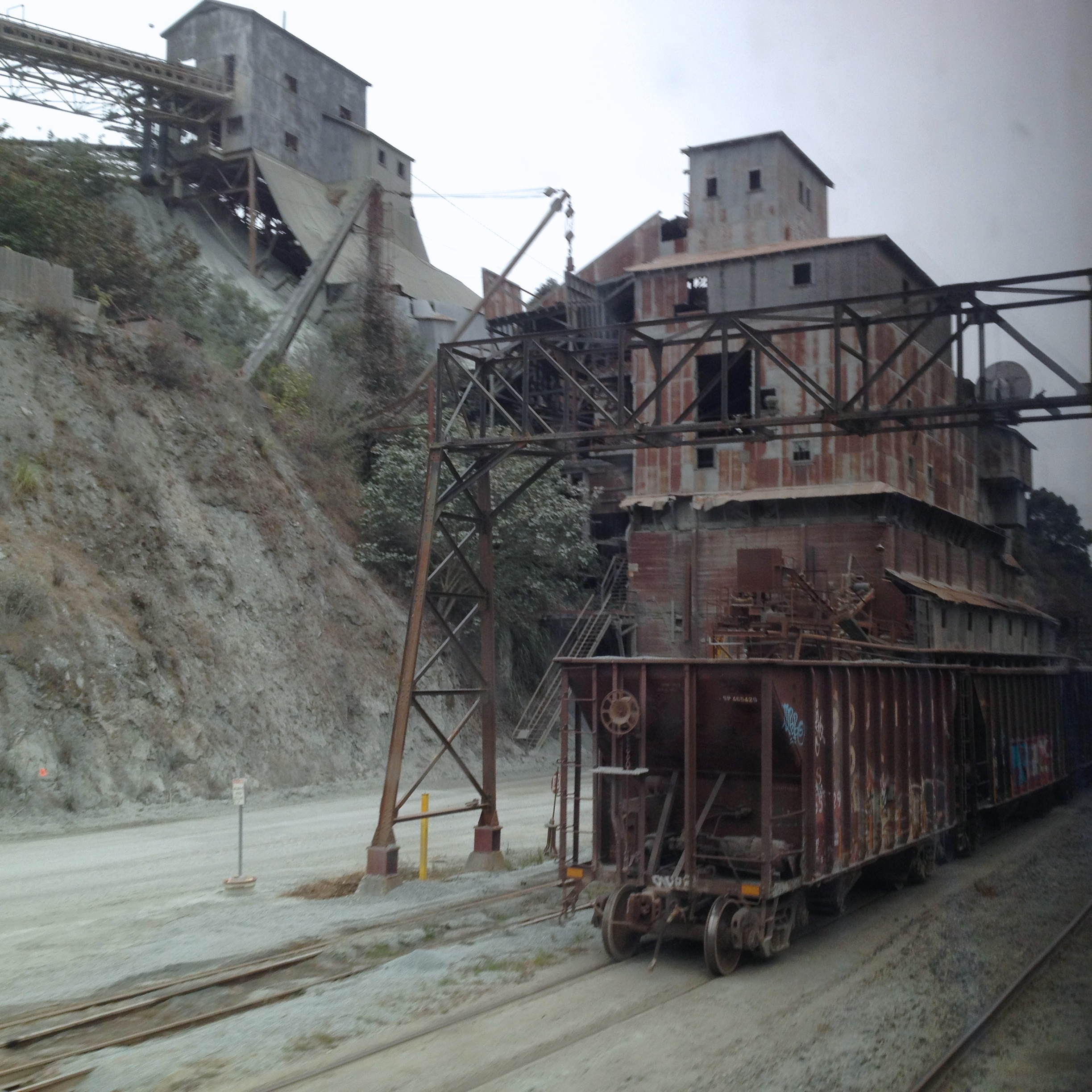
Another part of the Aromas quarry

In the 1930s, the Company opened California's first asphaltic concrete plant in Aromas and also began California's first delivery of pre-mixed concrete in tiny dump trucks. This concrete was used in projects including the WPA's construction of the Santa Cruz Civic Auditorium. World War II brought new activity, as materials were needed to build Fort Ord, Camp McQuaide and the Navy airstrip in Watsonville. Many men were away serving in the armed forces, so women and workers from Jamaica took over operations. A new plant was built at Asilomar in Pacific Grove, and excavation of the mining face at the Aromas quarry brought it down 100 feet, now level with the train tracks. A new primary crushing plant was built at the lower level and opened in 1946.

By the early 1950s, Jeff Wilson had left Granite Rock and Anna Wilson had retired. Her daughter, Mary Elizabeth Wilson Woolpert, took over as president. Again, it was a time for growth. Wet processing and loading plants were built at Aromas, and new plants were acquired at Salinas, Felton, Santa Cruz and Los Gatos. The Company purchased its first fleet of transit mixer trucks from Ford Motor Company in Salinas. With two young children at home, Betsy Woolpert turned the Company presidency over to her husband, Bruce G. Woolpert.

=== Modernization ===
During the 1960s and 1970s, there was tremendous development of the Monterey Bay and San Francisco Bay areas. Central Supply and Granite Rock Company merged to form one company, Graniterock, for construction materials production and sales, and expansion took place in sand, concrete, asphaltic concrete and building materials operations. New plants were opened in San Jose, Redwood City, Santa Cruz, Gilroy, Hollister, Salinas and Seaside. In step with the times, Graniterock installed its first computer—an IBM System 3. Fifty 100-ton hopper cars were purchased in 1971 and 1972 for rail shipment of sand to their San Jose and Redwood City plants. Rock from the Logan quarry was hauled north to repair the SP Dunsmuir, California, rail yard after flood damage in 1974.

In the 1980s, the company undertook a major investment to modernize the outdated Logan Quarry. A giant mobile primary crusher was designed and built—the world's largest of its kind conveyors were installed to carry rock from the primary crusher to a new wash plant and secondary crushers. A state-of-the-art, computer-controlled automated truck and rail car loading system was unveiled. All were designed to move the newly named A.R. Wilson Quarry into the 21st century.

The Pavex Construction Division, formed in 1989, was now providing road and highway construction and had become one of California's premier heavy engineering contractors. A new road materials plant in South San Francisco, concrete operations in Redwood City, Southside Sand and Gravel in Hollister, two new sand plants in Santa Cruz County and recycling centers in San Jose and Redwood City were added to the Graniterock family.

On February 14, 2000, A.R. Wilson's daughter, Mary Elizabeth (Betsy) Woolpert, and grandsons, Bruce Wilson Woolpert and Steve Gideon Woolpert, staged a 100th anniversary celebration for Graniterock employees, customers, and friends. New corporate offices were opened in Watsonville in 2002, and company sites were added in Oakland, Cupertino, and Milpitas.

=== Supreme Court decision ===
The company bought the mineral rights to 2,800 acres (1,100 ha) of land around and at the summit of Pico Blanco Mountain in the Big Sur region in 1963. The peak is topped by a distinctive white limestone cap, visible from California's Highway 1. The large, pharmaceutical-grade limestone contains an extremely high concentration of calcium in two deposits, known as the Pico Blanco body and the Hayfield body. It is the only high-grade deposit on the Pacific Coast outside Alaska within three miles of potential marine transportation. Reserves have been estimated to be from 600 million to a billion tons, reportedly the largest in California, and the largest west of the Rocky Mountains. Limestone is a key ingredient in concrete, and calcium is used in medicines, cosmetics, food and the production of clear glass. Granite Rock applied for a permit in 1980 from the U.S. Forest Service to begin excavating a 5 acres (2.0 ha) quarry on the south face of Pico Blanco within the National Forest boundary. The California Coastal Commission quickly notified Graniterock that it was required to apply for a coastal development permit as stipulated by the California Coastal Act. Granite Rock filed suit claiming that the Coastal Commission permit requirement was preempted by the Forest Service review. When Granite Rock prevailed in the lower courts, the Coastal Commission appealed to the United States Supreme Court. In 1987, the court in a historic 5–4 decision, found in favor of the commission.

By this time Granite Rock's permit had expired. The company's president Bruce Woolpert stated in 2010 that he believes at some point the company will be allowed to extract the limestone in a way that does not harm the environment. As of 2016, they still own the land.

== Products ==
Graniterock provides a wide range of construction aggregates, sand, decorative rock, concrete and building materials. It manufactures its own river rock and has a line of Wilson aggregates and sands.

Graniteseal is Graniterock's own sealcoat system based on the Carbonyte Process, which modifies molecular bonds to convert asphalt into a thermoplastic.

Graniterock also offers a number of green, sustainable, recycled and environmentally acceptable products to its customers. Its green products include Pervious Concrete, Perco-Crete, High-Fly Ash Content Concrete, Interlocking Pavers, Recycled Baserock, aggregates such as sand, rock and gravel, concrete and asphalt products, parking bumpers, Turfstone, ECO-Block, and erosion control.

== Publications about Graniterock ==
- Woolpert, Rose Ann; Engine Number Ten – A Nearly True Tale; illustrations by Jaguar Design Studio.
- Wyatt, Kim; Rock Solid – The Graniterock Story design by Mickey Cook.
