= Housing trust fund =

Map of contiguous United States showing support and funding for housing trusts as of 2007. Alaska does not have a state housing trust while Hawaii does and provides state funding.

Housing trust funds are established sources of funding for affordable housing construction and other related purposes created by governments in the United States (U.S.). Housing Trust Funds (HTF) began as a way of funding affordable housing in the late 1970s. Since then, elected government officials from all levels of government (national, state, county and local) in the U.S. have established housing trust funds to support the construction, acquisition, and preservation of affordable housing and related services to meet the housing needs of low-income households. Ideally, HTFs are funded through dedicated revenues like real estate transfer taxes or document recording fees to ensure a steady stream of funding rather than being dependent on regular budget processes. As of 2016, 400 state, local and county trust funds existed across the U.S.

== Funding ==
Trust Funds are typically funded with a dedicated source of revenue, though they can be funded through general budget allocations. They may also be funded through capital dollars backed by government bonds. The size of revenues also varies from fund to fund. A survey of 145 trust funds showed that 1/5th received more than $10 million per year, but the large majority (82%) received less than $5 million or no funding at all. The following is a non-exhaustive list of funding sources for various types of Housing Trust Funds in the United States.

Sources of funding for State Housing Trust Funds include:

- Unclaimed Property or Lottery Funds
- Interest on Broker, Title or other Real Estate Escrow Accounts
- Document Recording Fees (fees placed on documents recorded with government agencies)
- General Funds
- Government General Obligation (GO) Bond Revenues
- Real Estate Conveyance or Transfer Taxes
- State Income Taxes
- Unspent Temporary Assistance for Needy Families Reserves
- Section 8 Reserves
- Fees from Mobile Home Park Owners
- Interest from Budget Stabilization or Surplus Funds
- Interest from Tenant Security Deposits
- Eviction Court Fees
- Penalties On Late Real Estate Excise Taxes (taxes on the purchase price of real estate)
- Origination Fees

Sources of funding for County Housing Trust Funds include:

- Impact Fees
- Inclusionary Zoning In-Lieu Fees (fees paid in-lieu of providing affordable housing in a development)
- General Funds
- Private or Foundation Contributions
- Restaurant Taxes
- Government General Obligation (GO) Bond Revenues
- Real Estate Transfer Taxes
- Condominium Conversion Fees
- Sales Of County Surplus Land (land purchased by the county that is no longer needed)
- Document Recording Fees
- Sales Taxes
- Developer Proffers (fees paid to make a development more appealing for government approval)

Sources of funding for Local Housing Trust Funds include:

- General Funds
- Capital Improvement Project Funds
- Tax Increment Financing (TIF) Funds
- Impact Fees
- Tobacco Settlement Funds
- Hotel Occupancy Taxes
- Public Benefit Funds
- Government General Obligation (GO) Bond Revenues
- Condominium Conversion Fees
- Real Estate Transfer Taxes
- Sales Taxes
- Property Taxes, including dedicated levies
- Housing Excise Taxes
- Inclusionary Zoning In-Lieu Fees
- Disposal Waste Fees
- State Funding Allocations
- Sales of City Surplus Land (land purchased by the city that is no longer needed)
- Parking Garage Proceeds (revenue from city-owned parking garage operation)
- Developer Proffers (fees paid to make a development more appealing for government approval)
- Permit Fees

== Funding Priorities ==
Each trust fund has different objectives and goals based on the needs of the local population and political preferences, and each jurisdiction is responsible for determining how housing trust fund dollars may be used and who is eligible for funding. Funded activities may include new construction, acquisition, or rehabilitation activities. Funds may also support transitional housing, assistance for low- and moderate income home buyers, such as down payment assistance, education, or counseling, emergency repairs, loans for design costs of housing developers, or rental subsidies. Trust Funds typically target households earning 80% or less of the area median income (AMI), though some may only fund projects for homeless individuals or families or lower income targets. And, typically funded projects are required to remain affordable for a set period of years. These requirements and preferences may be established by the authorizing legislation or by the administrative body. This may determine which projects are more likely to be funded and who will benefit the most from the trust fund. Over time, housing needs of the population may change, and a Fund's regulations can change to accommodate new goals and objectives.

== Administration or Governance ==
Administration or governance rules are established by the authorizing legislation for the trust fund. Typically, they are administered by government agencies often with the oversight of a Board of directors consisting of membership by any of the following: lenders, community members, housing developers, low-income housing advocates, labor unions, or affordable housing residents. The oversight board may have true governing responsibilities or act purely as advisers. The governance strategy is primarily important for determining which projects get funding from the Trust Fund, particularly in a highly competitive jurisdiction. Administering agencies vary for each jurisdiction.

Administering agencies include:

- State, County, or City Housing Authorities
- State, County, or City Executive's Offices
- State Departments of Housing, Community Development, Community Services, Economic Development, or Commerce
- City Departments of Housing, Planning, Human Services, Neighborhood, Community Services, or Economic Development
- County Housing and Community Development Departments
- State Housing Finance Agencies, Corporations, Authorities, or Commissions
- State Community Development Corporations
- County or City Housing Commissions
- State Boards of Housing and/or Conservation
- City Housing Resources Boards
- City Housing and Redevelopment Agencies
- City Offices of Housing
- Community Foundations

== Types of Housing Trust Funds in the United States ==
=== National Housing Trust Fund ===
In 2008, Congress authorized a National Housing Trust Fund as part of the Housing and Economic Recovery Act (HERA), signed into law by President George W. Bush. The Trust Fund is intended to complement existing federal funding sources for affordable housing. By law 90% of fund are to support activities that build, preserve, repair, and operate rental housing for low-and very-low income households. Up to 10% of funds can support homeownership services for first-time home buyers like down payment and closing cost assistance and funding to reduce interest rates. Funds from surplus revenues generated by Fannie Mae and Freddie Mac were expected to fund the program. However, these payments have been suspended since the federal government placed them under conservatorship. On April 4, 2016, Julián Castro, Secretary of the United States Department of Housing and Urban Development (HUD), announced that nearly $174 million would be made available through the first ever allocation of the National Housing Trust Fund. President Obama's FY 2011 budget called for $1 billion to capitalize a national housing trust fund, but this request was not approved. Advocates hope to establish a dedicated source of revenue so that allocations are not subject to the annual budget process.

On March 27, 2014, U.S. Representative Maxine Waters from California's 43rd congressional district, introduced a discussion draft of the Housing Opportunities Move the Economy Forward Act of 2014 known as the HOME Forward Act of 2014. A key provision of the bill includes the collection of 10 basis points for “every dollar outstanding mortgages collateralizing covered securities” estimated to be approximately $5 billion a year. These funds would be directed to three funds that support affordable housing initiatives, with 75% going to the National Housing trust fund. It is proposed that the National Housing Trust Fund will then provide block grants to states to be used primarily to build, preserve, rehabilitate, and operate rental housing that is affordable to the lowest income households, and groups including seniors, disabled persons and low income workers. Rep. Waters' proposal could be a source of funding for the National Housing Trust.

The U.S. Housing and Urban Development (HUD) Department is responsible for administering the National Housing Trust Fund. When funded, states or their designated entities (for example, Housing Finance Commissions) are eligible to receive funding through formula grants based on population and need. States will then distribute funding to project applicants through grants and/or loans. All funded units must maintain affordability for 30 years.

=== State Housing Trust Funds ===
Statewide Housing Trust Funds are a significant source of financing for affordable housing nationwide, with 20% receiving more than $25 million per year in funding and some reaching more than $100 million. Currently, 47 of 50 states in the U.S. have at least one Housing Trust Fund. The most common revenue source is the real estate transfer tax, although many other options exist depending on state laws and political restrictions. That said, five states currently receive no funding even though trust funds exist in statute; Alabama, Arkansas, California, Idaho, and Rhode Island. On average, state trust funds leverage $7.00 in external public and private funding for every dollar of funding. The following are examples of State Housing Trust Funds:

==== California State Housing Trust Fund ====
In 1985, California established one of the first state housing trust funds in the nation. The trust fund was meant to capture revenue from offshore oil drilling. But while advocates thought it would bring in $20 million per year, it only resulted in one-tenth of that amount. Therefore, in 2002, voters passed Proposition 46, the Housing and Emergency Shelter Trust Fund Act, which authorized the state to sell $2.1 billion in general obligation bonds to benefit affordable housing. These bonds resulted in approximately $400 million in revenue per year between 2002 and 2005. However, these revenues were entirely expended by 2007.

In response, California voters passed Proposition 1C in 2006, the Emergency Shelter Trust Fund Act of 2006. This initiative authorized the state to sell an additional $2.85 billion in capital bonds to fund several types of housing-related programs, including: local infrastructure like sewers, parks, and transportation, homeownership assistance for downpayment support and low-interest loans or grants, low-interest loans for multifamily housing construction or rehabilitation, and loans and grants for homeless shelters and farmworker housing.

==== Delaware State Housing Development Fund ====
Established in 1986, Delaware's trust fund is administered by the State Housing Authority. Every $1 spent by the trust fund, generates $7 in general economic activity. Typically, the fund receives allocations from document recording fees and state general funds. However, in 2011, Delaware allocated $10 million from the state capital budget specifically to a Housing Preservation Fund within the Development Fund. The state has prioritized preservation of affordable housing since losing 9,460 units of affordable rental housing between 2000 and 2008.

==== Vermont State Housing & Conservation Trust Fund ====
Created in 1987, Vermont's Housing & Conservation Trust Fund has allocated $247 million in loans and grants to construct affordable housing, conserve farm land, and develop other community projects. This funding was leveraged nearly four times by $950 million in external private and public funding. Vermont's Trust Fund is administered by the Vermont Housing and Conservation Board (VHCB). By law, the Trust Fund is to receive half of the receipts from real estate transfer taxes. The FY2000 budget was the last to reach its statutory funding requirement. Since then, more than $35 million of property transfer taxes were diverted to other programs that should have funded the Trust Fund. Vermont estimates this could have funded construction of 1,050 units of affordable housing. In 2011, with strong support by Governor Peter Shumlin, Vermont appropriated more than $12 million to its Housing and Conservation Trust Fund--$8 million from real estate transfer taxes (95% of the statutory requirement) and $4 million from the capital budget.

==== Washington State Housing Trust Fund ====
Washington's Housing Trust Fund was established in 1987 by RCW 43.185.030. RCW 43.185.050 authorizes the Trust to fund proposals for new construction, acquisition, and rehabilitation as well as rent or mortgage subsidies, down payment or closing cost assistance for first-time home buyers, or mortgage insurance matching funds, social services for housing residents with special needs, technical assistance, shelters for homeless individuals, and projects making housing more accessible for households with disabilities. More detailed priorities for funding are developed by the Department of Commerce with the assistance of the Affordable Housing Advisory Board, consisting of 22 members primarily appointed by the Governor. Funding targets households earning below 80% of the county's median income and households with special needs, such as physical disabilities or developmental disabilities, and households served by the Departments of Health and Social and Health Services.

By law, the Fund can receive revenue from general revenue appropriated by the Legislature, private contributions, loan repayments, or other sources that the Legislature could establish by law. Currently, the Trust Fund receives revenue earned from the interest on earnest money in real estate transactions, as established by RCW 18.85.285. However, the Trust Fund relies heavily on revenue from capital bonds. These funds can only be spent on new construction, acquisition and rehabilitation or down payment and closing cost assistance for first-time home buyers; capital bond funds cannot be used for administration expenses. Over the last several years, funding has varied significantly from a high of $90–$100 million per year in 2008 and 2009 to only $50 million expected in 2011.

=== County Housing Trust Funds in the United States ===
As of 2009, 131 county housing trust funds existed across the U.S. In thirteen states, 41 county trust funds existed. In addition, 51 county trust funds are in place in Pennsylvania, and 39 county trust funds exist in the state of Washington. These 90 funds were established by state enabling legislation. In 2007, these county trust funds together received approximately $138 million per year in revenues. That year, these Funds leveraged $10.46 in external public and private contributions for every $1 of funding. Most commonly, the revenue for these funds stems from document recording fees.

==== Napa County, California Affordable Housing Fund ====
Napa County created its Trust Fund in 1992 to construct and rehabilitate affordable housing units. It is primarily funded through fees paid by developers (commercial or residential) in-lieu of building affordable housing, which would otherwise be required by the county's inclusionary zoning law. Since inception, the Fund has made more than $12 million in loans to support the development of 28 projects, creating more than 725 affordable housing units total, throughout the county. In addition to funding affordable housing construction, the fund provides down payment assistance loans of up to 10% of the cost of a home to home buyers who work in Napa County and earn less than 120% of the area median income. An applicant's new home must be within 15 miles of their workplace, and applicants for whom moving will reduce the length of their commute are more competitive for assistance based on the miles saved. The Fund is managed by the Housing & Intergovernmental Affairs Division of the Napa County Executive Office. However, in 2002, the county established the Napa County Community Affordable Housing Advisory Board to coordinate the efforts of the County Trust Fund and the Funds of cities throughout the county.

==== Dade County, Florida Housing Assistance Loan Trust Fund ====
Dade County established its Housing Trust Fund in 1984 to fund construction and rehabilitation of affordable housing for low-income households (defined by county law as below 80% of median income) and moderate-income households (80-140% of median income). The Trust is funded through a document tax at a rate of $0.45 for every $100.00 connected to the document. Florida law Sections 201.02 and 201.031 authorizes counties to levy the surtax on documents that transfer interest on real property, with an exemption for single-family residences. Since the program's inception, the Trust has assisted more than 7,000 first-time homeowners with low-interest second mortgages, helped construct 15,000 units of affordable rental housing. The Trust funds programs for first or second mortgages, property acquisition for affordable housing cooperatives, or new construction. However, new construction cannot comprise more than 50% of each year's funding allocations. At least 50% of funding must benefit low-income families rather than moderate-income. Since the program's inception, the Trust has assisted more than 7,000 first-time homeowners with low-interest second mortgages, helped construct 15,000 units of affordable rental housing.

==== Dade County, Florida Homeless Trust Fund ====
The Dade County Homeless Trust was established in 1993 specifically to provide housing and services for homeless individuals. It is jointly funded through a 1% restaurant tax of food and beverages, Housing and Urban Development (HUD) Department allocations, and other public and private contributions. The restaurant tax alone nets $12–$14 million per year of the Trust's $40 million/year budget. Every $1 from the Trust leverages $5 of external public and private funding, and that funding is allocated to shelters, transitional housing, and permanent housing with supportive services. The Trust is administered by the Dade County Homeless Trust responsible for allocating funds and implementing the Miami-Dade County Continuum of Care Community Homeless Plan. The Trust claims to have created 5,000 beds of emergency, transitional and permanent housing and reduced homelessness from 8000 to 800 under its watch.

=== Local Government Housing Trust Funds in the United States ===
The most common source of funding for local housing trust funds come from fees charged for private construction. This includes local impact fees or "in-lieu fees" (or fees paid under inclusionary zoning in-lieu of constructing affordable housing units). Several of the largest cities in the U.S., including New York City, Chicago, Los Angeles, Philadelphia, San Francisco, and Seattle, have city trust funds. These funds receive more than $10 million annually per city. In nine states (Arizona, California, Iowa, Indiana, Massachusetts, Missouri, New Jersey, Pennsylvania, South Carolina, Washington, and Wisconsin) adopted legislation encourages or enables local jurisdictions to dedicate public funds to affordable housing. Currently, 141 local housing trust funds exist in Massachusetts alone, and 282 New Jersey jurisdictions have a housing trust fund. In total, 494 cities across the U.S. have housing trust funds. As of 2007, these jurisdictions allocated $270 million annually to their housing trust funds. These funds leverage, on average, $6.50 in external public and private funds for every $1. The following are examples of Local Housing Trust Funds:

==== Boston, Massachusetts Housing Trust Fund ====
In 1983, Boston established its first linkage program to help balance commercial construction with construction of affordable, residential development. All commercial construction projects of more than 100,000 feet requiring zoning relief are required to pay linkage fees or construct affordable housing and/or fund job-training programs. As of April, 2006 the city's linkage fee for affordable housing was $7.87 per square foot and $1.57 per square foot for employment. Since 1986, the Neighborhood Housing Trust has managed expenditures of affordable housing linkage fees. More than $81 million in linkage fees have funded the new construction or preservation of more than 6,000 units of homeownership, rental, or cooperative housing for households earning less than 80% of the median income. Among other eligible uses, funds can be used to develop abandoned property or convert non-residential property to residential. All developments must remain affordable for 50 years for ownership housing and in perpetuity for rental housing.

==== Seattle, Washington Housing Trust Fund ====
Seattle's Housing Fund began in 1981 with voter-approved bond revenues. Since then, Seattle voters have approved and renewed a property tax levy every seven years, four times in total. The latest renewal was approved by Seattle voters in 2009 and authorized a dedicated levy of $145 million over 7 years, or more than $20 million per year. It authorized five programs: capital grants for new construction and preservation of rental housing units, funding for operations & maintenance of existing housing, rental subsidies, assistance for homebuyers, and a loan fund for acquisitions and other related opportunities. More than half of the funding for new construction and preservation is dedicated to serving households that earn less than 30% of the area median income ($18,000 per year for an individual in 2010). The homebuyers program gives low-interest loans for downpayments for first-time homebuyers earning less than 80% of the area median income ($45,100 per year for an individual in 2010). For every $1 invested by the Seattle Levy, approximately $4 is leveraged from external public and private funding.

=== Regional Housing Trust Funds in the United States ===
Multi-jurisdictional, or regional, trust funds help cities work together to meet the housing needs of an entire region. This can create peer pressure among jurisdictions to do their "fair share." One regional trust fund, A Regional Coalition for Housing (ARCH) in east King County, Washington, leverages $9 of external public and private funding for every dollar spent. Funding for ARCH is allocated by individual member jurisdictions. Resources may come from Community Development Block Grant (CDBG) dollars, developer fees, or basic General Funds. A Regional Housing Trust Fund also exists for Ohio's Columbus and Franklin Counties and for Sacramento County and City in California. Ohio's Regional Trust also receives funding from General Funds as well as from Hotel/Motel Taxes. Sacramento's Fund is supported by impact fees assessed by the regional redevelopment authority that administers the fund.

| Jurisdiction | Administering Agency | Sources of Funding |
|---|---|---|
| East King County, WA | ARCH (A Regional Coalition for Housing) | CDBG Funds, General Funds, Developer Fees, Loan Repayments |
| Columbus/Franklin County, OH | Columbus Housing Trust Corporation | Hotel/Motel Taxes, General Funds |
| Sacramento County/City, CA | Sacramento Housing and Redevelopment Agency | Linkage Impact Fees |
