= Sheetz v. County of El Dorado =

- Supreme Court of the United States

Argued January 9, 2024 Decided April 12, 2024
- Full case name: George Sheetz v. County of El Dorado, California
- Docket no.: 22-1074
- Argument: Oral argument

Case history
- Prior: 84 Cal.App.5th 394 (Cal. Ct. App. 2022)

Questions presented
- Is a monetary exaction imposed by a local government as a condition for a building permit exempt from the “essential nexus” and “rough proportionality” requirements established in Nollan v. Cal. Coastal Comm'n and Dolan v. City of Tigard, simply because the exaction is authorized by local legislation?

Holding
- The Takings Clause does not distinguish between legislative and administrative land-use permit conditions.

Court membership
- Chief Justice John Roberts Associate Justices Clarence Thomas · Samuel Alito; Sonia Sotomayor · Elena Kagan; Neil Gorsuch · Brett Kavanaugh; Amy Coney Barrett · Ketanji Brown Jackson

Case opinions
- Majority: Barrett, joined by unanimous
- Concurrence: Sotomayor, joined by Jackson
- Concurrence: Gorsuch
- Concurrence: Kavanaugh, joined by Kagan, Jackson

Laws applied
- U.S. Const. amend. V

Sheetz v. County of El Dorado, 601 U.S. 267 (2024) is a United States Supreme Court case regarding permit exactions under the Takings Clause. The Supreme Court held, in a unanimous opinion by Justice Amy Coney Barrett, that fees for land-use permits must be closely related and roughly proportional to the effects of the land use – the test established by Nollan v. California Coastal Commission and Dolan v. City of Tigard – even if the fees were established by legislation rather than through an individualized assessment.

== Background and facts ==
In 2016, George Sheetz, a property owner in Placerville, California, applied for a permit from El Dorado County to construct a manufactured single-family home on a lot. The county conditioned approval of the permit on a "traffic mitigation fee" of $23,420. The fee was authorized by legislation and would be utilized to "fund transportation improvements needed to accommodate growth anticipated by the county's general plan". The fee was dependent on the location of the property and the type of construction.

After paying the fee and obtaining the permit, Sheetz challenged the fee in a trial court, arguing that it violated the Takings Clause of the Fifth Amendment, barring governments from taking private property for public use without just compensation. He argued that the fee failed to adhere to the higher standards of scrutiny set by the Nollan/Dolan test for exactions. Under Nollan/Dolan, if the government intends to condition land-use permits on owners giving up property, it must show that the conditions are closely related and roughly proportional to the effects of the proposed land use.

The California Court of Appeal reaffirmed the trial court's holding and rejected application of the Nollan/Dolan test, ruling that the standard would apply only to adjudicative exactions, not legislatively enacted exactions imposed upon "a broad class of property owners." The California Supreme Court then denied review.

Sheetz appealed the decision to the United States Supreme Court and was granted certiorari on September 29, 2023.

== Holding ==
The case was argued before the Supreme Court on January 9, 2024, and the Court ruled in favor of Sheetz on April 12, 2024. Justice Amy Coney Barrett delivered the opinion for a unanimous court, holding that permit exactions generally authorized by legislation were not exempt from the higher standards of scrutiny applicable to ad hoc exactions set by administrators. Justice Barrett wrote that "there is no basis for affording property rights less protection in the hands of legislators than administrators. The Takings Clause applies equally to both". The case was remanded back to state courts for consideration. The court did not address whether the fee itself was a taking.

In a concurring opinion, Justice Sonia Sotomayor emphasized that the court did not address whether the fee imposed by El Dorado County was indeed a taking if imposed "outside the permitting process", and thus necessarily subject to scrutiny under Nollan/Dolan.

In a concurring opinion, Justice Neil Gorsuch argued that application of the Takings Clause and Nollan/Dolan should not vary depending on the "class of property" impacted by a relevant regulation.

In a concurring opinion, Justice Brett Kavanaugh emphasized that the majority opinion did not rule on the question presented by Gorsuch in his concurrence.

== Impact ==
Permit exactions have often been used by municipalities to offset costs related to new developments. For developers and homeowners, the reduction in impact fees will lead to a decrease in the overall cost of housing. In California in particular, municipalities have often relied on them because it was easier than raising property taxes. Across California in 2015, they averaged almost three times the nationwide average, and are sometimes used to prevent housing development, with rates which vary widely among cities, from $20,000 to $160,000 for a single-family home, accounting for 6 – 18% of the home's price. The National League of Cities advised municipalities that imposition of such fees would now require demonstrating the relationship and relative impact of affected property developments on the community.

== See also ==
- Pacific Legal Foundation
