= APFO =

APFO may refer to:

- Adequate Public Facilities Ordinance
- Aerial Photography Field Office
- Ammonium Perfluorooctanoate
- Association of Principal Fire Officers
- Association of Programs for Female Offenders
- Asia & Pacific Field Office
- Africa Peace Forum
