= Koontz v. St. Johns River Water Management District =

- Supreme Court of the United States

Argued January 15, 2013 Decided June 25, 2013
- Full case name: Coy A. Koontz, Jr., Petitioner v. St. Johns River Water Management District.
- Citations: 570 U.S. 595 (more) 133 S. Ct. 2586; 186 L. Ed. 2d 697; 2013 U.S. LEXIS 4918; 76 ERC 1649; 81 U.S.L.W. 4606
- Argument: Oral argument

Case history
- Prior: Florida Circuit Court, Orange County, entered judgment for landowner; affirmed, District Court of Appeal, 5 So. 3d 8 (Fla. Dist. Ct. App. 2009); reversed, 77 So. 3d 1220 (Fla. 2012); cert. granted, 568 U.S. 936 (2012).

Holding
- When a discretionary land-use permit is denied because the applicant declines to pay for improvements to other, unrelated property, a challenge to the constitutionality of the denial must be evaluated under the "essential nexus" standard of Nollan v. California Coastal Commission and the "rough proportionality" requirement of Dolan v. City of Tigard.

Court membership
- Chief Justice John Roberts Associate Justices Antonin Scalia · Anthony Kennedy; Clarence Thomas · Ruth Bader Ginsburg; Stephen Breyer · Samuel Alito; Sonia Sotomayor · Elena Kagan

Case opinions
- Majority: Alito, joined by Roberts, Scalia, Kennedy, Thomas
- Dissent: Kagan, joined by Ginsburg, Breyer, Sotomayor

Laws applied
- U.S. Const. amend. V

Koontz v. St. Johns River Water Management District, 570 U.S. 595 (2013), is a United States Supreme Court case in which the Court held that land-use agencies imposing conditions on the issuance of development permits must comply with the "nexus" and "rough proportionality" standards of Nollan v. California Coastal Commission and Dolan v. City of Tigard, even if the condition consists of a requirement to pay money, and even if the permit is denied for failure to agree to the condition. It was the first case in which monetary exactions were found to be unconstitutional conditions.

== Background ==
Petitioner Coy Koontz applied to the St. Johns River Water Management District for a permit to develop 3.7 acres of wetlands under the District's jurisdiction. Koontz offered to mitigate the loss of wetlands by conveying to the District a conservation easement over 11 acres of adjacent land. The District declined Koontz's mitigation offer, instead proposing that Koontz either reduce the size of his development to one acre, or pay for improvements to unrelated property owned by the District several miles away. Koontz responded by filing suit against the District in state court.

Following an initial dismissal, appeal, and remand, the Florida Circuit Court ruled that the District's demand for offsite mitigation violated Nollan v. California Coastal Commission and Dolan v. City of Tigard, since the improvements to the District's property were held to lack either an essential nexus or rough proportionality to the environmental impact of Koontz's proposed development. The state appellate court affirmed, but the Supreme Court of Florida reversed, holding that Nollan and Dolan did not apply because (1) Koontz's permit was denied, rather than granted subject to the unconstitutional condition, and (2) the District sought money rather than a conveyance of real property as a condition to issuing the permit. The Supreme Court granted certiorari to determine the applicability of Nollan and Dolan under these circumstances.

Koontz was represented by Paul J. Beard, II of the Pacific Legal Foundation. Amicus briefs in support of Koontz were filed by the American Civil Rights Union, the National Association of Home Builders, the National Federation of Independent Business Small Business Legal Center, and six other parties. The St. Johns River Water Management District was represented by Paul R. Q. Wolfson. Amicus briefs in support of the District were filed by the Solicitor General of the United States, the American Planning Association, the National Governors Association, and other public entities and officials. Deputy General Edwin Kneedler argued for the United States as amicus curiae in support of the District.

== Opinion of the Court ==
Writing for the Court, Justice Alito held that conditions imposed upon the issuance of a land-use permit must conform to the requirements of Nollan and, if applicable, Dolan even when the permit is denied for failure to comply with the conditions. The unconstitutional conditions doctrine forbids governments from “pressuring someone into forfeiting a constitutional right” by “coercively withholding benefits”. Nollan and Dolan “involve a special application” of the unconstitutional conditions doctrine to the Fifth Amendment right to just compensation. A government cannot, therefore, coerce someone applying for a permit to give away her property regardless of if the permit is approved after a successful threat or denied after a failed threat. Because both demand an unconstitutional condition, both are forbidden. However, the constitution only requires just compensation after a takings, and because Koontz sued under state law instead of allowing his property to be taken, the Court remands to determine if Florida law provides money damages for an unconstitutional conditions violation.

Nollan and Dolan also apply when, as here, the challenged condition amounts to a requirement to pay money, rather than to give up an easement over the property. The Florida Supreme Court had also held that if a government demands money instead of real estate there can be no takings. Alito observed that under this logic the Nollan and Dolan requirements “would be very easy” to avoid, especially since such development impact fees are already “utterly commonplace”. The takings clause applies because the government’s demand for money here was directly linked to a specific parcel of real property, as distinguished from the benefits in Eastern Enterprises v. Apfel.

Alito did not explain why such monetary exactions are not merely a tax as he contended that “teasing out the difference between taxes and takings is more difficult in theory than in practice.” The Court’s long-settled view is that takings require just compensation even if they are functionally similar to a tax and Alito saw no need to define the difference here. Finally, Alito dismissed Kagan’s fear of disrupting local governments because courts in Texas, Illinois, and Ohio had already been applying Nollan and Dolan to monetary exactions.

=== Dissenting opinion ===
Justice Kagan dissented, joined by Justices Ginsburg, Breyer, and Sotomayor. The dissent agreed that Nollan and Dolan apply when a land-use permit is denied for failure to comply with a condition, but argued that those standards should not apply when the agency conditions a permit on the payment of money, rather than a conveyance of a property interest. Kagan criticized the comprehensiveness of Alito’s analysis, stating that the majority is adopting “a prophylaxis in search of a problem”. She then faulted the majority for deciding too little, openly wondering if the majority would agree with those states that apply higher scrutiny to adjudicative decisions than legislative decisions. Believing that the Court will “rue the day” that it discouraged local governments from negotiating with developers, Kagan wrote “the majority turns a broad array of local land use-regulations into federal constitutional questions.”

The dissenting justices also maintained that, on the facts of this case, the District never actually demanded anything in exchange for a permit, and no regulatory taking took place because no property changed hands.

== Reactions ==
On remand the Florida Supreme Court remanded to the Florida Fifth District Court of Appeal, which simply readopted its 2009 decision awarding Koontz money damages.

The ruling was unpopular with some legal academics but lauded by others. Commentators encouraged localities to start denying permits without discussion but predicted that only "strong judicial action" will effect entrenched players. While Koontz leaves “exactions and takings jurisprudence in a confused and unsustainable state”, scholars believe it may encourage localities to adopt more alienable and standardized fee schedules or it may even lead to the eventual collapse of Nollan and Dolan exactions into the Due Process Clause.
