= Faria, California =

Unincorporated community in California, United States

- Unincorporated community
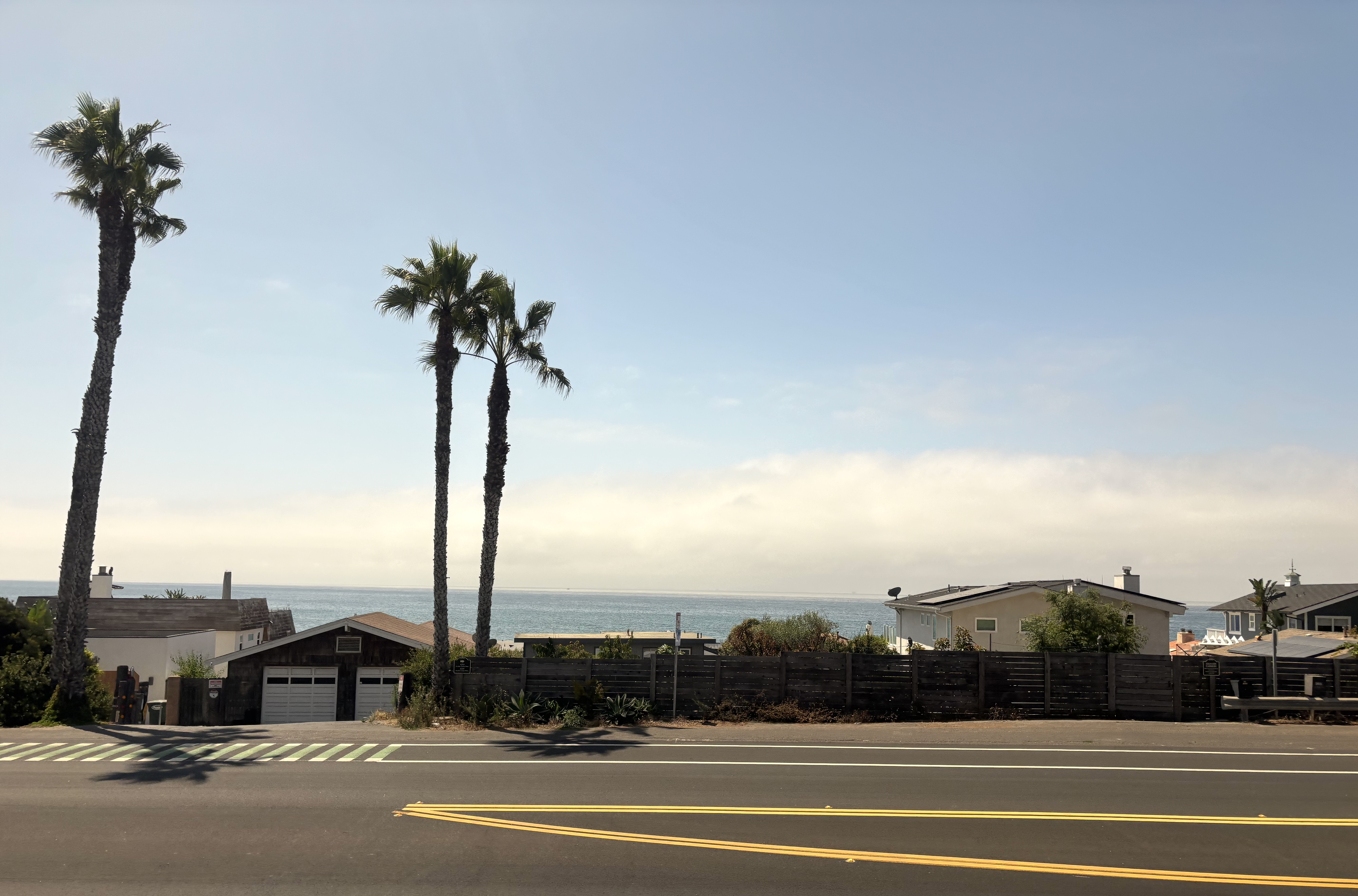

- Location within California Location within the United States
- Coordinates: 34°19′05″N 119°23′15″W
- Country: United States
- State: California
- County: Ventura
- Elevation: 10 ft (3.0 m)
- Time zone: UTC-8 (Pacific (PST))
  - Summer (DST): UTC-7 (PDT)
- ZIP Code: 93001
- Area code: 805
- GNIS feature ID: 1702921

Faria, also known as Faria Beach, is an unincorporated community in Ventura County, California, United States. Faria runs 1.32 miles (2.12 km) along the ocean side of California State Route 1, 9 miles (14 km) northwest of Ventura between Ventura and Carpinteria. It is within the Ventura Unified School District and has a Ventura ZIP Code.

== Toponym ==
Faria is named after Azorean settler Manuel da Terra Faria.

== Geography ==
Faria is located on Pitas Point, a popular surf spot also known as "Whistles." The rocky point faces south, with stretches of sandy beach running northeast and northwest from the point.

Pitas Point and nearby Punta Gorda were created by large uplift events. During an ancient earthquake, this area of the Rincon suddenly grew between 16 feet to 26 feet out of the surf zone as mechanically interlinked faults ruptured simultaneously. Scientists have made observations of old sections of shoreline along the coastal terrace and found that exceptionally large earthquakes had occurred on the Ventura-Pitas Point faults due to the simultaneous rupturing of the interlinked faults. They also reached the conclusion that much larger earthquakes could occur than had previously been predicted.

== History ==
In 1769, the Spanish Portola expedition came northwest along the beach from the previous night's encampment on the Ventura River. The explorers found a small native village near a watering place at what is now called "Padre Juan Canyon" (which reaches the sea at Pitas Point) and camped nearby on August 15. "Padre Juan" refers to Fray Juan Crespi, a Franciscan missionary travelling with the expedition, who noted that the natives "kept us awake playing all night on some doleful pipes or whistles". Thus the point was named "los pitos" - Spanish for "whistles". Later American coast survey mapping misspelled the name as "Las Pitas", which was the Spanish name for the Agave americana (century plant).

=== Supreme Court case ===
Beach access at one of the beachfront homes was the subject of the 1987 US Supreme Court case Nollan v. California Coastal Commission.
