= Exaction =

An exaction is a concept in US real property law where a condition for development is imposed on a parcel of land that requires the developer to mitigate anticipated negative impacts of the development. The rationale for imposing the exaction is to offset the costs, defined broadly in economic terms, of the development to the municipality. Exactions are similar to impact fees, which are direct payments to local governments instead of conditions on development.

== Exactions and takings ==
The Supreme Court of the United States has identified several criteria for identifying when an exaction becomes a taking that requires compensation under the Fifth Amendment.

=== Essential nexus ===
In Nollan v. California Coastal Commission, the court ruled that an exaction is legitimate if it shares an "essential nexus" with the reasons that would allow rejection of the permit altogether. In Nollan the court required compensation for a public easement over the dry sand area of the beach as a condition for development, because they found that the easement was not closely related enough to fighting the psychological barrier to beach access that the development would present.

=== Rough proportionality ===
In Dolan v. City of Tigard, the court added that an exaction is legitimate only if the public benefit from the exaction is roughly proportional to the burden imposed on the public by allowing the proposed land use—that is, that the exaction is not excessive to compensate for the externality the proposed land use would impose. This "rough proportionality" must be shown by an individualized determination, with the burden on the government to show its evidence. In Dolan, the court required compensation for an exaction that required donation of land for a public greenway and bike path, because a private greenway would have been sufficient and the City of Tigard was not specific enough about the benefits of the bike path.

=== Permit denials and monetary exactions ===
In Koontz v. St. Johns River Water Management District, the court clarified that the standards of Nollan and Dolan apply even when a permit is denied because the applicant refuses to agree to an exaction, and even when the exaction consists of a payment of money, rather than a dedication of land.

In Sheetz v. County of El Dorado, the Supreme Court of the United States expanded exactions to apply to both adjudicative and legislative actions.
