= Adequate Public Facilities Ordinance =

American legislative method

An Adequate Public Facilities Ordinance (APFO, also known as an Concurrency Regulation) is an American legislative method to tie public infrastructure to growth for a region.

APFOs take into account the availability of infrastructure. They can manage growth, but are considered separate from growth controls such as building moratoria.

== History ==
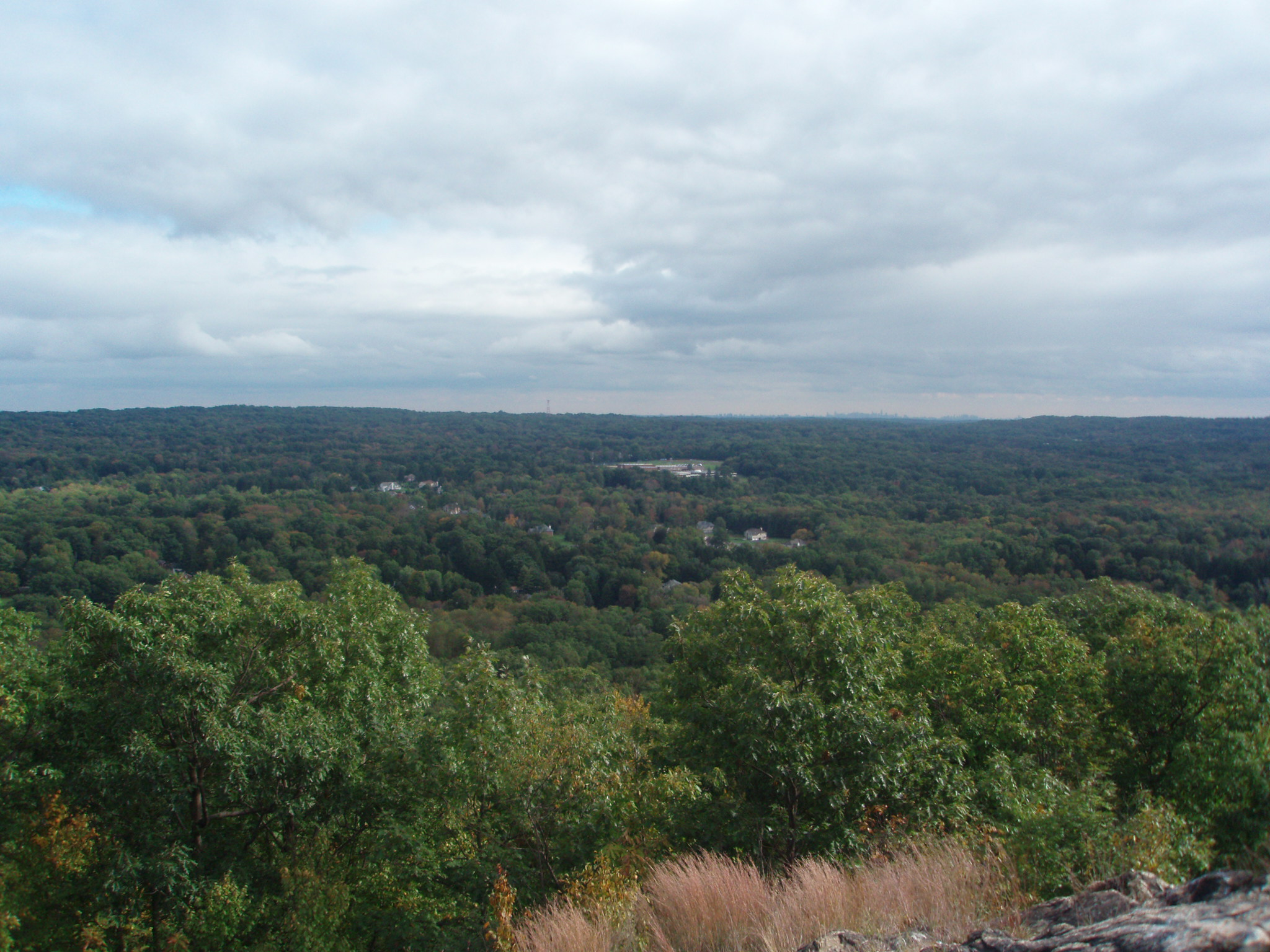
View of Ramapo, New York

Ramapo, New York (see Golden v. Planning Board of Ramapo); Petaluma, California; and Boulder, Colorado; were some of the early adopters of this tool in America. The state of Florida uses the term "concurrency" in its growth management act.

== Scope ==
APFO regulations are typically applied to a jurisdiction which has legislative control of a given area. In America, this can be at a state, county, or city level. A conflict can occur when APFO regulations differ in scope between jurisdictions where there is shared funding and legislative authority (such as a city located inside a county that funds schools). While APFOs are intended to mitigate infrastructure shortcomings for a particular area, the mitigation may apply to areas offsite of the development project. APFO regulations usually apply to individual projects on a case-by-case basis.

APFO regulations take into account some or all of a jurisdiction's infrastructure requirements, including:

- Transportation
- School facilities
- Water supply
- Water treatment
- Roads

Other elements include:

- CIP – Capitol Improvement Programs
- Service Level Standards

== Criticism ==
Traditional opponents of APFO legislation include industries affected by moratoria or fees, including realtors, developers, and some Smart Growth advocates. Home costs for some locations that have enacted APFO have experienced increases in housing prices affecting affordable housing, in conjunction with positive effects of relief from school capacity shortcomings.

== See also ==
- Ecistics
- Activity centre
- Context theory
- Exclusionary zoning
- Form-based codes
- Inclusionary zoning
- Mixed use development
- New urbanism
- Non-conforming use
- Planning permission
- Principles of Intelligent Urbanism
- Reverse sensitivity
- Spot zoning
- Statutory planning
- NIMBY
