= Golden v. Planning Board of Ramapo =

1971 New York Court of Appeals case

- Court: New York Court of Appeals
- Full case name: Golden v. The Planning Board of the Town of Ramapo
- Decided: 23 July 1971
- Citations: Golden v. Planning Board, Golden v. Ramapo, 37 A.D.2d 236 (N.Y. App. Div. 1971), 324 N.Y.S.2d 178

Case opinions
- Concurrence: John F. Scileppi

Golden v. Planning Board of Ramapo was a landmark 1971 land-use planning case in New York that established growth management planning as a valid exercise of the police power in the United States.

== Background ==
The Town of Ramapo, New York passed a zoning ordinance prohibiting development of a subdivision plat unless the property owners had a special permit, one of the early Adequate Public Facilities Ordinances. Permits were granted based on a point system based on available municipal facilities in the area of proposed development, with the intent of phasing development over the lifetime of the town's 18-year capital plan. Developers could meet the requirements to be granted a special permit by constructing their own infrastructure. Property owner Ruth Golden and other plaintiffs, who either were denied approval of their subdivision plats because they had not applied for special permits or had never applied for platting because they were aware that they would not receive a special permit, sued.

The New York Supreme Court denied the plaintiff's suit. This was reversed by the New York Supreme Court, Appellate Division, which found that control or regulation of population growth did not fall under the authorized uses of zoning. Ramapo appealed to the New York Court of Appeals.

== Decision ==
The Court of Appeals confirmed that the State of New York's legislation enabled zoning phased growth. Writing for the court, Justice John F. Scileppi stated, "The restrictions conform to the community's considered land use policies as expressed in its comprehensive plan and represent a bona fide effort to maximize population density consistent with orderly growth." The court further stated that, because the ordinance did not prevent eventual development, its restrictions did not comprise a taking.

== Effects ==
The case, along with Berenson v. Town of New Castle, provided the foundation for the subsequent growth management movement in the United States. The system where individual municipalities manage growth, rather than it being managed at the state level, is sometimes referred to as "the Ramapo system." It is criticized for encouraging urban sprawl and for being effectively exclusionary in areas with limited developable land. The New York Court of Appeals returned to this issue 20 years later in Long Island Pine Barrens Society, Inc. v. Planning Board of Brookhaven, where the appellate division required a cumulative environmental impact analysis over three towns for developments, which was seen as a threat to local land use authority. The Court of Appeals overturned the appellate division, disappointing environmentalists who had seen an opportunity for cumulative analysis for critical natural resource areas around the state.

Golden v. Ramapo and Construction Industry Association of Sonoma County v. The City of Petaluma, California are the basis for the use of development impact fees to finance public infrastructure throughout the United States.
