= Massachusetts Comprehensive Permit Act: Chapter 40B =

The Comprehensive Permit Act is a Massachusetts law which allows developers of affordable housing to override certain aspects of municipal zoning bylaws and other requirements. It consists of Massachusetts General Laws (M.G.L.) Chapter 40B, Sections 20 through 23, along with associated regulations issued and administered by the Massachusetts Department of Housing and Community Development. Chapter 40B was enacted in 1969 to address the shortage of affordable housing statewide by reducing barriers created by local municipal building permit approval processes, local zoning, and other restrictions. Its goal is to encourage the production of affordable housing in all communities throughout the Commonwealth.

For the purposes of this statute, affordable housing is defined as a unit which could be purchased or rented by a household making up to 80% of the median income of the area. Such housing must be subject to affordable housing restrictions to preserve affordability in the long term.

== Comprehensive permitting process ==
Under Chapter 40B, in any municipality where none of the three statutory minima identified by the State are met for the amount of affordable housing that exists in the community, a developer can build more densely than the municipal zoning bylaws would permit, allowing more units per acre of land when building a new development, if at least 25% (or 20% in certain cases) of the new units have long-term affordability restrictions. The three statutory minima are the following:

- At least 10% of the total housing units are eligible to be listed on the State's Subsidized Housing Inventory (SHI);
- At least 1.5% of the general land area is dedicated to housing eligible to be listed on the SHI; or
- Within one year, construction will begin on least 0.03% of the total land area of the municipality for the purpose of creating affordable housing.

Chapter 40B continues to be controversial and it has not overcome the multiple barriers that exist to building affordable housing in the state. A study by the National Low Income Housing Coalition rated Massachusetts as being the least affordable state in which to rent an apartment in 2003. Despite the law, fewer new affordable housing units are built in Massachusetts compared to the state's needs. The shortage contributes to sprawl as workers move further away from jobs in order obtain affordably priced houses. The high price of housing is one reason that young adults move away from Massachusetts.

Municipalities have occasionally attempted to gain "affordable" classification for existing inexpensive housing units that are not deed-restricted to maintain the long-term future affordable status of the units. Some municipalities have requested that mobile homes be allowed. As of April 2016, state legislators are currently considering making this change.

== Impact ==
The goal of the Affordable Housing Law (Chapter 40B) is to make at least 10% of every Massachusetts's community's housing stock affordable for moderate income households. As of June 30, 2011, 39 communities had met that goal. Details are available on the Department of Housing and Community Development (DHCD) Subsidized Housing Inventory. In addition, 101 communities have developed Affordable Housing Production Plans that have been approved by DHCD. Six of those communities have been certified as meeting the benchmarks in their plans, which entitles them to "safe-harbor" protections from Chapter 40B proposals under 760 CMR 56.03()(b) and 56.03(4)(f).

Over the last decade, the Affordable Housing Law has been directly responsible for approximately 80% of the affordable housing built in Massachusetts outside the major cities. More than 58,000 homes have been created for working families, seniors, and people with disabilities all across the state because of this law. Nearly half of all of the units were created by non-profits, like Habitat for Humanity.

== Enforcement ==
The Massachusetts Office of the Inspector General, from 2005 to 2012, issued several reports criticizing lax enforcement of developers' profit limitations for 40B developments, and described subterfuges used by developers to earn more profit on affordable housing than the statute and regulations permit, and that the municipalities and the state have inadequate supervision, auditing, and enforcement of the municipal agreements with developers and developers' reporting of sales and profits under the agreements and law. In addition, until he left office in 2012, Massachusetts Inspector General Gregory Sullivan frequently criticized Chapter 40B. As a result of recommendations from the Office of the Inspector General, the Department of Housing and Community Development has "taken constructive actions to address the identified weaknesses that will strengthen the overall control process exercised by both Chapter 40B rental development owners and project administrators to ensure that only income-qualified households occupy affordable apartments developed under Chapter 40B."

== Changes in the law, 2008: SJC decisions and revised regulations ==
In 2008 the Massachusetts Department of Housing and Community Development issued a comprehensive revision of regulations and guidelines for Chapter 40B. In the same year, the Massachusetts Supreme Judicial Court issued seven decisions on substantive and procedural issues in regard to Chapter 40B law, nearly the number of decisions rendered during the previous decade.

== Campaign to Protect the Affordable Housing Law ==
On November 2, 2010, Massachusetts voters rejected an initiative petition (Question 2) that would have repealed Chapter 40B. The vote was 1,254,759 (58%) against repeal to 900,405 (42%) in favor of repeal. The Campaign to Protect the Affordable Housing Law, a state ballot committee, had been formed to oppose the elimination of the law. The campaign was a coalition of more than 950 individuals and organizations, including civic, business, religious, and academic leaders as well as senior, environmental, housing, and civil rights groups. The campaign was supported by all three gubernatorial candidates: Deval Patrick, Tim Cahill, and Charlie Baker. The group contended that repealing the affordable housing law would immediately halt the creation of housing that is affordable to seniors and working families in many communities across the Commonwealth of Massachusetts.

== See also ==
- Inclusionary zoning
- List of towns in Massachusetts
- List of cities in Massachusetts
- Massachusetts government § Local government
- New England town
