= Pacific Legal Foundation =

American libertarian public interest law firm

Coordinates: 38.5834°N 121.4924°W

- Formation: March 5, 1973; 53 years ago
- Type: 501(c)(3) nonprofit organization
- Tax ID no.: 94-2197343
- Headquarters: 555 Capitol Mall, Suite 1290; Sacramento, California, U.S.
- President and CEO: Steven D. Anderson
- Chair: Robert D. Connors
- Revenue: $31.6 million (2024)
- Expenses: $35.5 million (2024)
- Website: pacificlegal.org

The Pacific Legal Foundation (PLF) is an American libertarian nonprofit public interest law firm. PLF attorneys provide pro bono legal representation, file amicus curiae briefs and hold administrative proceedings with the stated goal of supporting property rights, equality and opportunity, and the separation of powers. The organization is the first and oldest libertarian public interest law firm, having been founded in 1973.

Pacific Legal Foundation is primarily funded by donations from individuals, foundations, associations, and small businesses. Except for court-awarded attorney fees for case victories, the organization receives no government funding. The foundation is generally described as supporting libertarian or conservative causes.

As of April 2025, PLF has won 18 cases before the United States Supreme Court, with the most recent being Sheetz v. County of El Dorado.

== History ==
Incorporated in Sacramento, California, on March 5, 1973, PLF's original staff was composed mainly of individuals who had been a part of then-Governor Ronald Reagan's welfare reform team. Operating on a proposed budget of $117,000 (equivalent to $848,557 in 2025) for the first 10 months of operation, PLF attorneys began litigation activities in June 1973 under the direction of Ronald A. Zumbrun, PLF's first president.

PLF was one of first organizations in a movement of freedom-based public interest law firms (PILF) in the early 1970s. In describing the reasons for starting PLF, Raymond Momboisse, one of the founders, asserted that PLF represented "the free enterprise system and the little guy."

PLF won its first Supreme Court case in 1987 and has since argued 20 cases, with three having been litigated in the 2023 term.

Currently, PLF has a staff of over 100 employees and three offices across the United States: Sacramento, CA; Arlington, VA; and Palm Beach Gardens, FL.

== Current legal areas ==
=== Property rights ===
PLF's property rights cases have focused on regulatory takings and environmental regulations. The Foundation's attorneys have successfully argued five takings cases at the United States Supreme Court: Nollan v. California Coastal Commission, Suitum v. Tahoe Regional Planning Agency, Palazzolo v. Rhode Island, Koontz v. St. Johns River Water Management District, and Knick v. Township of Scott, Pennsylvania.

PLF has litigated housing and zoning issues in lower courts. PLF successfully challenged San Francisco's "Relocation Assistance Payment Ordinance", which required landlords to pay tenants to regain personal use of their property. PLF won a case at the Michigan Supreme Court, challenging a common practice of counties foreclosing properties for unpaid taxes and keeping the surplus home equity.

PLF's environmental law litigation has frequently involved challenges to federal regulation of private property under the Clean Water Act or the Endangered Species Act, including five victories at the U.S. Supreme Court. PLF attorneys represented a Minnesota property owner who was denied the right to build on his property in Contoski v. Scarlett, a case that resulted in the removal of the bald eagle from the endangered species list. PLF argued that the U.S. Fish and Wildlife Service failed to delist the species after it concluded that the bald eagle population had recovered.

PLF represented Andy Johnson in a dispute with the Environmental Protection Agency. Johnson built a stock pond on his property in Wyoming to provide water for his cattle. EPA found that he had violated the Clean Water Act, demanded that he remove the pond, and fined him $37,500 per day (equivalent to $53,670 in 2025), eventually resulting in $16 million in fines (equivalent to $22,899,408 in 2025). Wyoming's senators called the agency's action "heavy-handed bureaucracy." The case was settled in 2016, with EPA dropping the fines and demands, and Johnson agreeing to plant willow trees to protect the ground from erosion. Johnson's case was highlighted by President Trump when he signed an Executive Order to reduce regulatory agencies' ability to rely on administrative guidance to justify enforcement actions against citizens.

PLF represented Uri Rafaeli, a Michigan resident whose property was foreclosed and sold at auction for a property tax debt of $8.41. The county kept the entire proceeds from the auction, over $24,000 (equivalent to $29,857 in 2025), based on a state law which was aimed at preventing blight but allows counties to keep the entire proceeds from property auctions, even if the amount raised at auction is greater than the amount owed in back taxes. The Michigan Supreme Court ruled in favor of Rafaeli and found the practice illegal under the Michigan Constitution. The practice, which PLF refers to as "home equity theft", is also legal in other states such as Arizona, Illinois as well as Washington D.C. PLF has helped pass legislation in Wisconsin, Montana, and North Dakota to end home equity theft.

PLF has frequently litigated property disputes along the coast and other shorelines, including several cases challenging actions by the California Coastal Commission. The organization argues there is no conflict between private ownership of shoreline and the public good, because development can increase opportunities to experience the beach and to protect it.

=== Equality and opportunity ===
PLF argues that certain licensing laws and similar regulations violate the individual right to earn a living and result in a loss of jobs and a lower standard of living for Americans. PLF has battled against Certificate of Need (CON) laws in multiple states that require new entrants to a job market to receive a "certificate of need" from the government to which businesses currently engaged in the occupation may object to the competition. PLF represented Arty Vogt from Lloyd's Transfer & Storage in a challenge to West Virginia's CON law regulating interstate movers, which required new moving companies in the state to be approved by incumbents. The case concluded in 2017 when the state passed a law effectively repealing the regulation. In 2023, PLF won a lawsuit in Kentucky, first filed in 2019, challenging the state's CON law regulating non-emergency medical transportation. PLF has challenged and succeeded in ending CON laws for other movers operating in Oregon, Missouri, and Pennsylvania. Additionally, PLF has also filed cases challenging CON laws that limit new birth centers in Georgia and Iowa.

In 2008, PLF won Merrifield v. Lockyer, a challenge to California licensing of pest control. The Ninth Circuit Court of Appeals ruled that "economic protectionism for its own sake, regardless of its relation to the common good, cannot be said to be in the furtherance of a legitimate governmental interest."

PLF has participated in cases challenging affirmative action policies, both under the federal Constitution's Equal Protection Clause and state constitutional provisions such as California's Proposition 209 and Washington's Initiative 200. In 2018, PLF filed a number of lawsuits on behalf of boys seeking to compete on high school dance teams. In South Dakota, the South Dakota High School Activities Association changed their regulations to allow boys to compete in competitive dance following PLF's lawsuit. Additionally, the Minnesota State High School League also amended their rules to allow boys in competitive dance following lawsuits filed by PLF on behalf of two male students. In 2019, PLF, representing a group of black and Hispanic parents, filed a federal lawsuit arguing that Connecticut's enrollment standards for its magnet schools are discriminatory. Connecticut caps the enrollment of black and Hispanic students in magnet schools at 75%, while no less than 25% of students can be white or Asian. PLF was also involved in Hi-Voltage Wire Works, Inc. vs San Jose, in which the California Supreme Court upheld the amendment banning racial preferences.

In 2018, PLF sued New York Mayor Bill de Blasio, challenging his proposed changes to the admissions policies of New York City's specialized high schools. De Blasio proposed expanding the Discovery program, which admits students just under the cutoff for the admissions test, from 6% to 20% of all students accepted, a move which he claimed would increase black and Hispanic diversity in those schools. PLF represents Asian-American parents and advocacy groups who claim that the mayor's plans discriminates against Asian-American students and amounts to unconstitutional racial balancing.

In Hurley v. Gast PLF challenged the state of Iowa's law requiring a fixed "gender balance" on the State Judicial Nominating Commission. This law mandated that each district's two elected commissioners must consist of one male and one female. As a result of staggered elections, only one vacant seat appeared on the ballot in each district, and candidates were only eligible to run if they matched the departing commissioner's gender. In January 2024, the district court ruled in favor of Hurley, finding that Iowa had failed to demonstrate how its sex-based classification “a presumptively invalid state action,” could withstand heightened scrutiny. The court concluded that Iowa Code § 46.2(1) violated the Equal Protection Clause of the Fourteenth Amendment of the United States Constitution. The court further ordered the State Court Administrator to cease the enforcement of Iowa Code § 46.2(1), removing gender balancing from future elections.

=== Separation of powers ===
PLF has litigated several cases arguing for citizen access to judicial review. In Sackett v. Environmental Protection Agency, the Supreme Court held that the Sacketts could go to court to challenge an EPA compliance order. In U.S. Army Corps of Engineers v. Hawkes Co., Inc, the Court held that a jurisdictional determination that the property in question constituted "waters of the United States" was a final agency action subject to judicial review.

In 2017, PLF began studying and commenting on the Congressional Review Act as a tool to eliminate regulations. In 2018, they filed two lawsuits demanding that regulatory agencies follow the CRA and submit their new rules to Congress.

In 2018, PLF launched a campaign to end what it characterizes as unconstitutional regulation through litigation, legislation, and executive action, focusing on restoring its interpretation of an original understanding of the separation of powers. PLF launched a legal challenge of FDA's Deeming Rule, arguing that it was signed by a career civil servant, rather than an officer of the United States as required by the appointments clause of the Constitution. In 2019, PLF released a study of 2,952 rules issued by HHS between 2001 and the beginning of the Trump administration which claimed that 71% were issued unconstitutionally, the majority being signed by career executive employees (civil servants), not "an officer of the United States." The study found that 98% of the FDA's rules issued in that time period were issued by career employees.

During the COVID-19 pandemic, PLF helped to draft and advance legislation in 11 states to limit executive powers.

== Historic legal areas ==
=== Freedom of speech and association ===
PLF successfully challenged Minnesota polling place laws that violated voters' right to free speech in Minnesota Voters Alliance v. Mansky. The Supreme Court held 7–2 in favor of PLF's client, the Minnesota Voters Alliance, finding that the state's restrictions on clothing worn in the polling place were not reasonable and violated the First Amendment. PLF was also instrumental in overturning a Virginia law banning the advertising of happy hours, suing on behalf of restaurateurs who could not advertise drink specials in the state in violation of the First Amendment. Additionally, in Keller v. State Bar of California, PLF successfully curbed the California State Bar's use of compulsory dues to finance political and ideological activities.

PLF represents two freelancer groups suing to block the implementation of California AB5, which severely limits the number of pieces freelance writers and photographers may provide to publishers. The lawsuit alleges that the law treats journalists differently than fine artists, grant writers, and marketing representatives.

=== Other ===
In the early 1980s, PLF filed a case that critics have called a strategic lawsuit against public participation (SLAPP), which attempted to obtain the mailing list of the Abalone Alliance to get the group to pay for the police costs of the largest anti-nuclear civil-disobedience act in U.S. history, at the Diablo Canyon Power Plant. The case was rejected multiple times for the plaintiffs' lack of standing, and was eventually dismissed altogether. PLF stated that it did receive funding from utility companies, but would not disclose whether PG&E, the plant's owner, had contributed.

== Law school programs ==
=== Chapman University ===
PLF operated a "Liberty Clinic" at Chapman University's Fowler School of Law, where a PLF attorney supervises a trial-court program as part of the law school's Constitutional Jurisprudence Clinic. Students in the clinic had hands-on roles in ongoing court cases and learn how strategic litigation works. This is no longer available at Chapman University.

=== University of California, Berkeley ===
In 2018, PLF began teaching a seminar and field placement at UC Berkeley School of Law on strategic constitutional litigation. The seminar, taught by PLF Executive Vice President and General Counsel John M. Groen, focuses on property rights and economic liberty. In the field placement, students join a PLF litigation team to work on on-going court cases.

== Supreme Court cases ==
PLF has litigated 20 cases before the United States Supreme Court. Its 18 victories are:

- Nollan v. California Coastal Commission, 483 U.S. 825 (1987): The Court held, in a 5–4 opinion by Justice Scalia, that the Coastal Commission could only place conditions on the Nollan's development permit to rebuild their home where those conditions substantially furthered government interests that would justify denial of the permit entirely. Because the Nollan's request to rebuild their home did not further the government's interest in overcoming a perceived "psychological barrier" to using the beach, the condition was a regulatory taking without compensation, in violation of the Fifth Amendment.
- Keller v. State Bar of California, 496 U.S. 1 (1990): A unanimous Court held that, "The State Bar's use of petitioners' compulsory dues to finance political and ideological activities with which petitioners disagree violates their First Amendment right of free speech when such expenditures are not necessarily or reasonably incurred for the purpose of regulating the legal profession or improving the quality of legal services."
- Suitum v. Tahoe Regional Planning Agency, 520 U.S. 725 (1997): A unanimous Court held that property owners do not have to attempt to sell their transferable development rights before they can claim a regulatory taking of property.
- Palazzolo v. Rhode Island, 533 U.S. 606 (2001): The Court held that property owners may challenge land use restrictions that were enacted before they acquired the property. Justice Kennedy wrote that "Future generations, too, have a right to challenge unreasonable limitations on the use and value of land."
- Rapanos v. United States, 547 U.S. 715 (2006): The Court rejected the Army Corps of Engineers' broad definition of wetlands subject to federal jurisdiction but left unanswered the question of whether the phrase "waters of the United States" in the Clean Water Act includes a wetland that at least occasionally empties into a tributary of a traditionally navigable water.
- Sackett v. Environmental Protection Agency I, 566 U.S. 120 (2012): Argued by PLF attorney Damien M. Schiff, the case challenged EPA's practice of unilaterally asserting jurisdiction over private property without a hearing and without judicial review. In a unanimous opinion, the Court sided with PLF and the Sacketts, ruling that EPA's compliance orders are subject to immediate judicial review under the Administrative Procedure Act (APA).
- Koontz v. St. Johns River Water Management District, 570 U.S. 595 (2013): The Court considered the issue of whether the Nollan and Dolan nexus limitation and proportionality test apply to an exaction in the form of a government demand that the permit applicant make off-site improvements, and whether these same Nollan and Dolan doctrines extend to permit exactions, where the permit has been denied due to the applicant's rejection of that exaction. The Supreme Court found in favor of the property owner on June 25, 2013.
- U.S. Army Corps of Engineers v. Hawkes Co., Inc., No. 15-290, 578 U.S. ___ (2016): The Court held that the Army Corps of Engineers' jurisdictional determination that the property in question constituted "water of the United States" was a final agency action subject to judicial review under the Administrative Procedure Act (APA).
- National Association of Manufacturers v. Department of Defense, No. 16-299, 583 U.S. ___ (2018): The Court unanimously ruled that the EPA cannot shelter its "waters of the United States" rule from judicial review by arbitrarily limiting where victims can sue.
- Minnesota Voters Alliance v. Mansky, No. 16-1435, 585 U.S. ___ (2018): The Court ruled that a Minnesota statute prohibiting individuals from wearing political apparel at a polling place violates the Free Speech Clause of the First Amendment.
- Weyerhaeuser Company v. United States Fish and Wildlife Service, No. 17-71, 586 U.S. ___ (2018): In this case the government, under the Endangered Species Act, designated private land in Louisiana as a potential "critical habitat" for the dusky gopher frog, enjoining the plaintiffs' use of the land. However, the dusky gopher frog does not inhabit the land, nor is the land currently suitable for use as its habitat. In a unanimous decision, the Supreme Court ruled that it cannot be a critical habitat if it is not a habitat and remanded to the 5th Circuit to determine what is a habitat under the Act.
- Knick v. Township of Scott, Pennsylvania, No. 17-647, 588 U.S. ___ (2019): The Court overruled a prior case that required property owners to seek compensation for state and local property takings in state courts first. Instead, the Court allowed such cases to be brought directly to federal court. Chief Justice John Roberts wrote, "[f]idelity to the Takings Clause and our cases construing it requires overruling Williamson County and restoring takings claims to the full-fledged constitutional status the Framers envisioned when they included the Clause among the other protections in the Bill of Rights."
- Cedar Point Nursery v. Hassid, No. 20-107, 594 U.S. ___ (2021): The Court ruled that a California regulation giving labor organizations an uncompensated "right to take access" to an agricultural employer's property (for up to 3 hours a day, 120 days a year) in order to solicit support for unionization, effects a per se physical taking under the Fifth Amendment.
- Pakdel v. City and County of San Francisco, No. 20-1212, 594 U.S. ___ (2021): The Court summarily rejected the lower court's ruling that a plaintiff challenging a "regulatory taking" must exhaust administrative appeals before suing in federal court.
- Wilkins v. United States, No. 21-1164, 598 U.S. ___ (2023): The Court threw out a 12-year statute of limitations clause put in place by a lower court that restricted property owners Larry Wilkins and Jane Stanton from suing the federal government over a property rights dispute. Wilkins and Stanton will now be able to argue that the National Park Service unlawfully changed the easement of a road that ran through their property.
- Tyler v. Hennepin County, No. 22-166, 598 U.S. ___ (2023) The Court ruled the practice known as "home equity theft" to be unconstitutional. In the ruling, the court made it clear that, though the county has the right to sell property in order to recoup taxes and fines, it does not have the right to keep more than it is owed.
- Sackett v. Environmental Protection Agency II, No. 21-454, 598 U.S. ___ (2023): The Court ruled to restore limits on the Clean Waters Act powers by clarifying the term "navigable waters", specifically wetlands and streams that do not have a continuous surface connection with navigable waters. This ruling will significantly reduce the amount of land that comes under federal jurisdiction.
- Sheetz v. County of El Dorado, No. 22-1074, 601 U.S. ___ (2024) The Court ruled unanimously that exactions imposed in the land-use permitting context are subject to heightened scrutiny under Nollan and Dolan, even if the exactions are authorized by a legislative body (and not only when they are imposed ad hoc or discretionarily by an official within the government body).

Its two losses are:

- Costle v. Pacific Legal Foundation, 445 U.S. 198 (1980)
- Murr v. Wisconsin, No. 15-214, 582 U.S. ___ (2017)

At the California Supreme Court, PLF principal attorney Sharon L. Browne won two significant victories upholding the constitutionality of Proposition 209.

== Notable people ==
- Fess Parker, former trustee
- John Yoo, trustee
- Brian Cartwright, chair of Board of Trustees
- Robert F. Kane, former member of Board of Trustees

== See also ==
- Federalist Society
- Sissel v. United States Department of Health & Human Services
