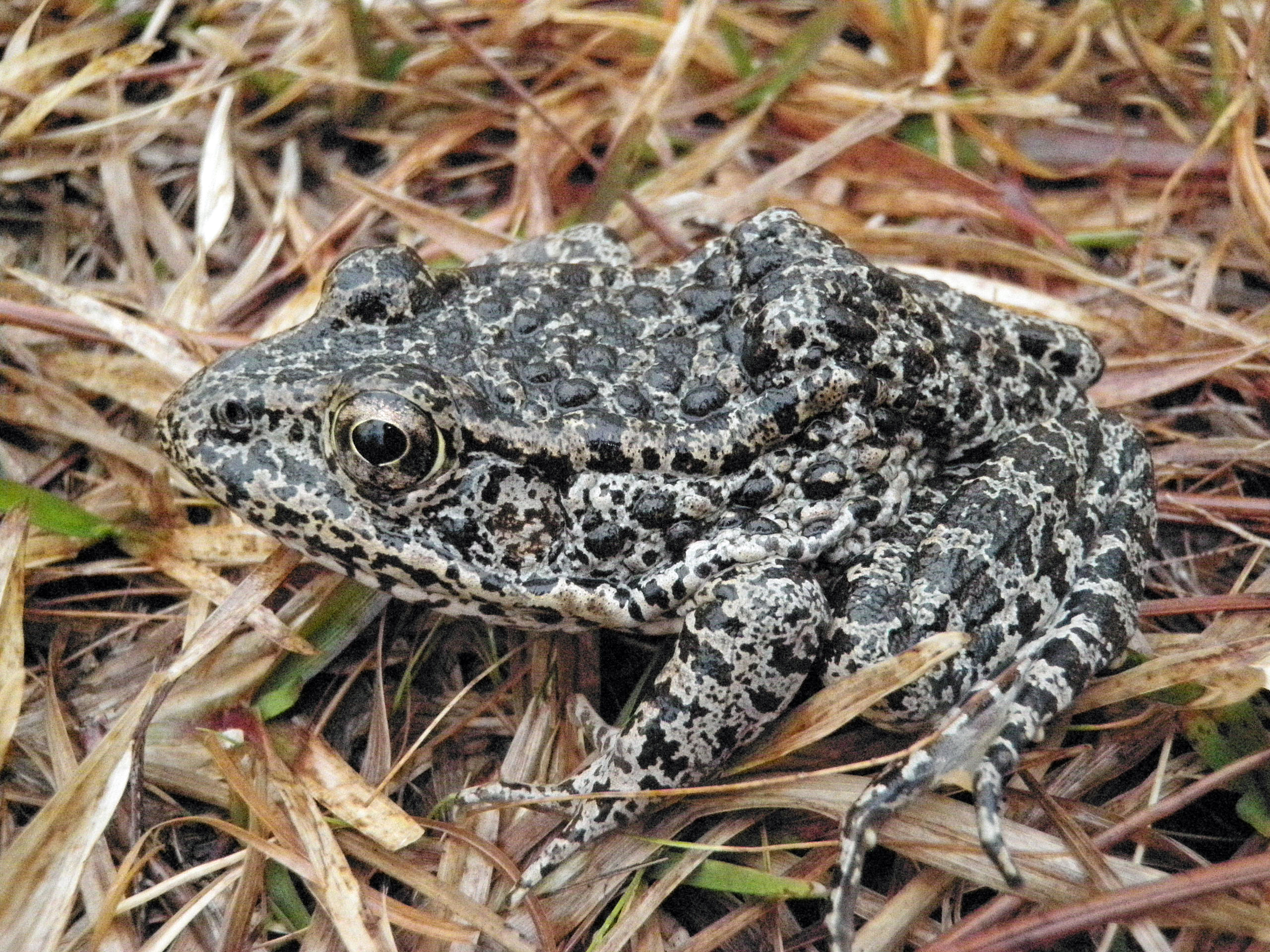

Conservation status
- Critically Endangered (IUCN 3.1)

- Endangered (ESA)

Scientific classification
- Kingdom: Animalia
- Phylum: Chordata
- Class: Amphibia
- Order: Anura
- Family: Ranidae
- Genus: Lithobates
- Species: L. sevosus

Binomial name
- Lithobates sevosus (Goin & Netting, 1940)
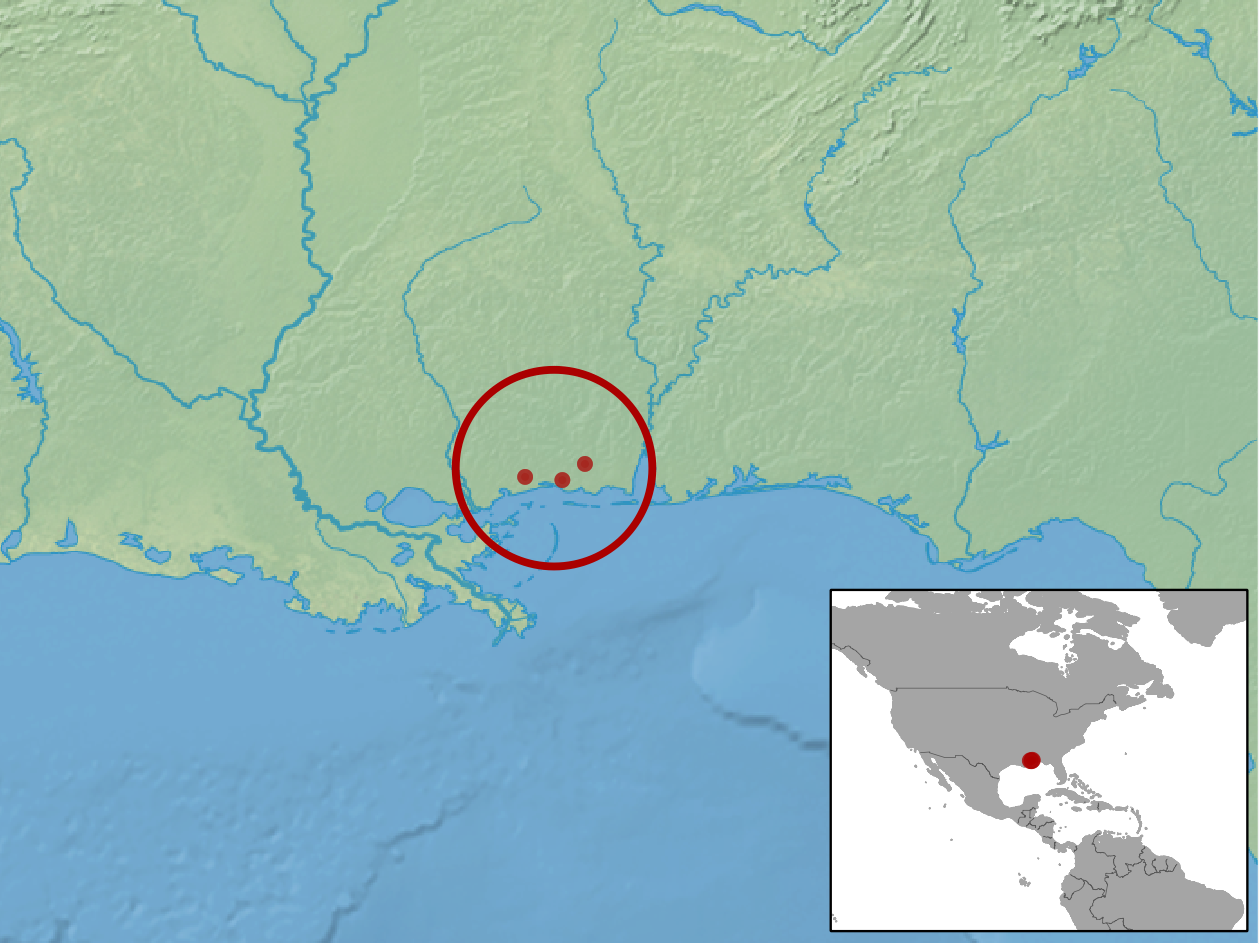

Synonyms
- Rana sevosa Goin & Netting, 1940; Rana capito sevosa — A.H. Wright & A.A. Wright, 1942; Rana areolata sevosa — Viosca, 1949; Rana sevosa — Young & Crother, 2001; Lithobates sevosus — Frost et al., 2007

= Mississippi gopher frog =

Species of amphibian

The Mississippi gopher frog (Lithobates sevosus), also known commonly as the dark gopher frog, the dusky gopher frog, and the St. Tammany gopher frog, is a critically endangered species of frog in the family Ranidae (true frogs). The species is endemic to the southern United States. Its natural habitats are temperate coastal forests and intermittent freshwater marshes. This secretive frog is on average 3 in (8 cm) long, with a dark brown or black dorsal surface covered in warts. It is a federally listed endangered species of the United States.

== Taxonomy ==
The Mississippi gopher frog was originally described as a new species (Rana sevosa) by Coleman J. Goin and M. Graham Netting in 1940. Subsequently, it was considered one of several subspecies of the more widespread and common gopher frog (Rana capito). It was re-elevated to species status in 2001. Owing to uncertainty in its taxonomy, the Mississippi gopher frog was initially listed under the Endangered Species Act as a distinct population segment of Rana capito, called Rana capito sevosa by the U.S. Fish & Wildlife Service. Subsequent taxonomic revisions have placed it and many other North American ranid frogs in the genus Lithobates.

== Geographic range ==
The Mississippi gopher frog was once abundant along the Gulf Coastal Plain in lower Louisiana, Mississippi, and Alabama – from east of the Mississippi River Delta to Mobile Bay. However, it has not been seen in Alabama since 1922 or in Louisiana since 1967. Presently, only two known populations exist, with about 100 frogs to be found in Glen's Pond, Harrison County, Mississippi. The other population is less dense and spread out through the surrounding wetlands, recently found to concentrate around Mike's Pond, Jackson County, Mississippi. Currently, the range of Lithobates sevosus is decreasing at a dramatic rate due to urban sprawl, deforestation, and even fire suppression that destroys the possibility of sunlight reaching down to the wetlands, critical for the growth of the frogs' immediate habitat. Currently, the two known populations of Lithobates sevosus are separated by only 32 km (20 mi).

== Characteristics ==
The Mississippi gopher frog is a mid-sized, stocky, frog with a total body length of about 3 in (8 cm). The frog's back ranges in color from black to brown or gray and is covered with dark spots and warts. The male's call has been compared to the sound of human snoring. Another notable feature of this secretive frog is that, when exposed to bright light or threatened, the frog will put its hands in front of its face to shield its eyes. Other defense responses include inflating its body and excretion of a bitter, milky fluid from warty glands located on its back. Maximum longevity of the frog is six to 10 years.

The diet of adult Mississippi gopher frogs probably includes frogs, toads, insects, spiders, and earthworms. Males reach sexual maturity at four to six months and females at two to three years. The fist-sized egg masses, containing 2,000 or more eggs, are typically attached to stems of emergent vegetation. Tadpoles average slightly over 1 in (3 cm) long and require 80 to 180 days to complete metamorphosis in the field.

The Mississippi gopher frog possesses several defense mechanisms in its immune system that are unique to Lithobates sevous. The frog's innate immune system is adept at recognizing outside prokaryotic pathogens. Lithobates sevous reacts quickly to exterior pathogens, effectively limiting the extent of infections in the early hours after exposure. Similar to other species of frogs and toads, Lithobates sevous synthesizes antimicrobial peptides that act as effective defenses against outside pathogens. The frog excretes these chemicals through glands in its skin, and they are remarkably effective, killing certain pathogens in a matter of minutes.

Lithobates sevous, similar to other species of frogs and toads, secrete antimicrobial peptides upon adrenergic stimulation, stress, and injury. Generally, in any sample collected there are multiple antimicrobial peptides released, each serving a different specific function. These antimicrobial peptides, noted for their concentrated effectiveness make for attractive models of bacteriostatic therapeutics. They also require no immunologic memory, they are secreted and effective against outside chemical threats as soon as they are released from the body of Lithobates sevous. Furthermore, these antimicrobials only affect the membrane of the target pathogens as opposed to human anti-histamines that directly affect the human immune system.

== Habitat ==
The Mississippi gopher frog's habitat includes both upland, sandy areas covered with open longleaf pine forest with abundant ground cover; and isolated, temporary, wetland breeding sites within the forested landscape. Adult frogs spend most of their lives in or near underground refuges in uplands. They often use both active and abandoned gopher tortoise burrows; they also use abandoned mammal burrows, stump and root holes, and possibly crayfish burrows.

Breeding sites are isolated, grassy ponds that dry out completely at certain times of the year; their seasonal nature prevents establishment of a fish population, which would endanger tadpoles. Substantial winter rains are needed to ensure the ponds are filled sufficiently to allow development of juvenile frogs. The timing and frequency of rainfall is critical to the successful reproduction of the Mississippi gopher frog. Adult frogs move to breeding sites in association with heavy rains during winter and spring (December to April). Tadpoles must complete their metamorphosis before the ponds dry in the early summer.

== Population and reproduction ==
The Mississippi gopher frog was listed as endangered by the state of Mississippi in 1992 and by the US Fish and Wildlife Service in 2001. The only known remaining population of the Mississippi gopher frog consists of about 100 adult frogs from one site in Harrison County, Mississippi (Glen's Pond). Several possible sites are located in Jackson County, Mississippi. The Mississippi gopher frog is among rarest amphibians in North America, if not the rarest.

There were two known places of the Mississippi gopher frog. They were Glen's Pond at Harrison County, Mississippi, and Mike's Pond at Jackson County, Mississippi. Scientists discovered a population of Mississippi gopher frogs at Mike's Pond in 2004. Due to conservation efforts, the frog's trajectory has turned around. While the species remains critically endangered and still relies on intensive interventions, its numbers have grown to around 600 adults, spread out over some 15 ponds and a handful of captive populations that now produce offspring.

Population shifts in this species are mainly due to adult mortality, difference in ages at maturity, and a lack of adults returning to mate. Due to the facts that adults rarely return to reproduce and how isolated the population is, the population of this species of frog depends strongly on the constant return of frogs in their juvenile stage with the most consistent rate of reproduction a year. Male Mississippi gopher frogs mature around the ages 6–8 months, while females mature around the ages of 24–36 months. Though anywhere from 65 to 92% of them survive to adulthood only a small percentage of them return to mate. Adult Mississippi gopher frogs live to about the age of 7 and are estimated to return and reproduce only once every 4–5 years.

== Predation and disease ==
Adults face every-day threats from a wide assortment of possible predators, including birds, mammals, and reptiles. Tadpoles face predation from fish, aquatic insects, birds, turtles, and snakes. Chytridiomycosis caused by chytrid fungus, an infectious disease of amphibians, has had a detrimental effect on Mississippi gopher frog populations.

== Threats ==
The historic regional decline of the species has been related to loss of open longleaf pine habitat needed for subsistence and the seasonal ponds needed for reproduction. Implementation of fire suppression in the 1930s was a factor, because frequent fires are necessary to maintain suitable open canopy and ground cover vegetation of the aquatic and terrestrial habitats. Reduced gopher tortoise populations may also be a factor of the frog's demise.

Other natural processes—such as genetic isolation, inbreeding, droughts, and floods—pose ongoing threats to the existing population. In addition, a host of immediate anthropogenic threats confront the only remaining breeding pond of the frog: a proposed residential development, new and expanded highways, extended rail infrastructure and a proposed reservoir. The main threats posed by these projects are local changes in hydrology, the need for fire suppression, and habitat destruction and fragmentation. Other concerns include possible sedimentation and run-off of toxic chemicals that may injure or kill tadpoles and adult frogs.

This species of frog is quickly declining because of many reasons. One reason that might not be thought of as a main reason is they are thick. If these frogs are not all together in one general area they will not be able to reproduce. Since there is a lot of isolation of the Mississippi gopher frog they cannot reproduce with other frogs, which makes the population smaller. If they do reproduce, it would be inbreeding which will lower the genetic variability of the frog. This could severely impact their chance of survival. This will all lead to the extinction of the Rana sevosa if more conservation efforts are not being done.

A significant reason for underpopulation in this species of frog has been threats toward the eggs. The estimated survival of Mississippi gopher frogs that live to reach the stage of metamorphosis is between 0 and 5.4%. Caddisfly larvae play a factor in causing egg mortality for these frogs and many other amphibians, but they are not found on the frog eggs after every mating season.

Some of the major threats to the Mississippi gopher frog include the nearly complete destruction of the long-leaf pine forest which is a home to the frog. Other threats include fire suppression, drought, pesticides, urban sprawl, highway construction and the decline of gopher tortoises. Gopher tortoises build burrows in which the Mississippi gopher frog and a variety of other animals take shelter. So a decline in gopher tortoises directly affects the habitats of gopher frogs in which they will be forced to relocate. The Mississippi gopher frog is also threatened by chytridiomycosis which is a disease threatening amphibians worldwide. Furthermore, due to the small population of the Mississippi gopher frog, it is highly susceptible to inbreeding which will decrease its genetic variability and can potentially decrease its chance for survival.

== Recovery effort ==
Putting the Mississippi gopher frog on the endangered species list requires locals to receive a permit to kill or take one of the frogs from the wild; however, the species is so endangered that it would require an additional recovery plan in order to guide the species back to a healthy population level. Fortunately, a conservation team has been deployed in order to manage the recovery of the Mississippi gopher frog by managing the habitat, supplementing habitat with sufficient water, raising tadpoles for release, constructing or restoring new breeding sites, and managing ecological requirements and diseases. Another recovery option available for the Mississippi gopher frog is the introduction of more gopher tortoises for the Mississippi gopher frogs in order to widen their habitats.

The remaining population of this frog is only at about one hundred adult frogs in Glen's Pond at Harrison County, Mississippi. Lithobates sevosa is considered one of the rarest amphibians in North America. This shows that this species' population is quickly declining. Some ways to keep the Mississippi gopher frog alive is by using well water to keep the soil waterlogged. This would increase the reproductive success of this species of frog because it would have better environment for reproduction. This would hopefully end or slow down the extinction of Lithobates sevous. Another conservation effort for this frog would be to make sure the tadpoles are raised in a closed environment where they can develop fully and stay healthy. Many predators in ponds and in the wild endanger the tadpoles. If the tadpoles were raised in a safe environment, they would survive and reproduce.

A Gopher Frog Recovery Team oversees conservation strategies that include pond water supplementation in dry years, habitat management, assisting tadpole survival, captive rearing, construction of alternative-breeding ponds, and treating infected tadpoles. The recovery effort was greatly enhanced in 2007 by the donation of "Mike's Pond" to the Nature Conservancy.

The US Fish and Wildlife Service has been working with the US Forest Service to protect the last remaining Mississippi gopher frog population. Both agencies have joined forces to rehabilitate a nearby pond as a future breeding site. The Fish and Wildlife Service, in conjunction with gopher frog researchers, has developed a strategy to introduce egg masses into this pond and to determine if the eggs can successfully develop into juvenile frogs at the site. Maintenance of open longleaf pine-dominated uplands and seasonal wetlands through growing season prescribed burning is the most appropriate form of management. This management strategy also favors gopher tortoises. Mechanical site preparation, as well as stump removal, should be avoided in forestry operations.

Five zoos (New Orleans, Memphis, Detroit, Miami, and Omaha) have 75 Mississippi gopher frogs in captivity, and are conducting ongoing artificial breeding programs.

== U.S. Supreme Court case ==
In January 2018, the United States Supreme Court agreed to hear the case Weyerhaeuser Co. v. U.S. Fish and Wildlife Service, in which landowners challenged the Fish and Wildlife Service's decision to designate 1,500 acres of forest in Louisiana as a critical habitat for the gopher frog.

On November 27, 2018, the case was decided, with the Supreme Court vacating and remanding it back to the Court of Appeals. The Supreme Court's opinion is succinctly summarized with "Because it determined that the Service's decisions not to exclude were committed to agency discretion and therefore unreviewable, the Court of Appeals did not consider whether the Service's assessment of the costs and benefits of designation was flawed in a way that rendered the resulting decision not to exclude Unit 1 arbitrary, capricious, or an abuse of discretion. Accordingly, we remand to the Court of Appeals to consider that question, if necessary, in the first instance."
