= Keller v. State Bar of California =

- Supreme Court of the United States

Argued February 27, 1990 Decided June 4, 1990
- Full case name: Eddie Keller, et al., Petitioners, v. State Bar of California, et al.
- Citations: 496 U.S. 1 (more) 110 S.Ct. 2228; 110 L. Ed. 2d 1; 1990 U.S. LEXIS 2862; 58 USLW 4661

Case history
- Prior: 226 Cal. Rptr. 448 (Cal. App. 1986); reversed, 47 Cal.3d 1152, 255 Cal.Rptr. 542, 767 P.2d 1020 (1989); cert. granted, 493 U.S. 806 (1989)

Holding
- Attorneys may be required to be members of a state bar association, but compulsory membership dues collected by the association may be used only to regulate the legal profession or improve the quality of legal services in the state.

Court membership
- Chief Justice William Rehnquist Associate Justices William J. Brennan Jr. · Byron White; Thurgood Marshall · Harry Blackmun; John P. Stevens · Sandra Day O'Connor; Antonin Scalia · Anthony Kennedy

Case opinion
- Majority: Rehnquist, joined by unanimous

Keller v. State Bar of California, 496 U.S. 1 (1990), was a case in which the Supreme Court of the United States held that attorneys who are required to be members of a state bar association have a First Amendment right to refrain from subsidizing the organization’s political or ideological activities.

== Introduction ==
Attorneys licensed to practice in California are required by law to be members of, and pay dues to, the State Bar of California. In this action, 21 California attorneys sued the State Bar, objecting to the agency's use of its members' dues to fund political and ideological activities that the members did not support. The attorneys were represented by the nonprofit public interest law firm Pacific Legal Foundation. The attorneys argued that such use of their compulsory dues violated their right to freedom of speech and freedom of association, or more precisely, the freedom not to associate, under the First Amendment, as applied to the states by the Fourteenth Amendment.

== Facts of the case ==
In 1982, when the complaint in this case was filed, the State Bar of California was an active voice on political issues, both within California and nationally. The State Bar lobbied on matters pending before the legislature and before other state agencies, filed briefs in politically charged cases, and convened a Conference of Delegates to adopt resolutions taking positions on highly contentious political and ideological issues.

The objecting attorneys challenged the use of their dues for (1) lobbying on issues such as gun control, the death penalty, special education, exclusions from gift taxes, voter approval of low-rent housing projects, and immigration; (2) filing amicus curiae briefs in cases involving the constitutionality of a victim's bill of rights, the power of a workers’ compensation board to discipline attorneys, a requirement that attorney-public officials disclose names of clients, and the disqualification of a law firm; and (3) the adoption of resolutions by the State Bar's Conference of Delegates endorsing a gun control initiative, disapproving the statements of a United States senatorial candidate regarding court review of a victim’s bill of rights, endorsing a nuclear weapons freeze initiative, and opposing federal legislation limiting federal-court jurisdiction over abortions, public school prayer, and busing. The plaintiffs asked for an injunction forbidding the State bar from using mandatory dues for ideological or political purposes.

== Prior history ==
The trial court granted summary judgment to the State Bar, ruling that, as a government agency, the Bar itself had a First Amendment right to engage in political speech. This ruling was reversed by the California Court of Appeal, which, in a published decision, found that the State Bar's activities were similar to those of a labor union, and its authority to use mandatory dues for political or ideological purposes was similarly constrained. This opinion in turn was reversed by the California Supreme Court in 1989. That court found that the State Bar functioned essentially as a government agency, and scrutinizing the Bar's activities under the First Amendment would impose an "extraordinary burden" on the organization's mission. The United States Supreme Court granted certiorari in 1989.

== Decision of the Court ==
In a unanimous decision by Chief Justice William Rehnquist, the Court held that attorneys may be compelled to belong to the State Bar, but that their mandatory dues could be used only to regulate the legal profession or improve the quality of legal services available to the people of the state. Reasoning that membership in the State Bar was analogous to membership in a labor union, the Court held that the Bar would have to implement the procedures established in Chicago Teachers Union v. Hudson, that is, the objectors were entitled to an adequate explanation of the basis for the fee, a reasonably prompt opportunity to challenge the amount of the fee before an impartial decisionmaker, and an escrow for the amounts reasonably in dispute while such challenges are pending.

== Subsequent history ==
The State Bar was slow to comply with the Keller, decision, resulting in a follow-up lawsuit in 1991 brought by the second-named plaintiff in Keller, Raymond L. Brosterhous, and 40 other attorneys who objected to the Bar’s continued use of their dues for political and ideological activities. This litigation eventually resulted in a court order that the Bar’s Conference of Delegates, lobbying, special activities designed to promote the careers of women and minorities, and other social and political programs could not constitutionally be funded by compulsory Bar dues.

== See also ==
- List of United States Supreme Court cases
- List of United States Supreme Court cases by the Rehnquist Court
- List of United States Supreme Court cases involving the First Amendment
