= Weyerhaeuser Company v. United States Fish and Wildlife Service =

- Supreme Court of the United States

Argued October 1, 2018 Decided November 27, 2018
- Full case name: Weyerhaeuser Company, Petitioner v. United States Fish and Wildlife Service, et al.
- Docket no.: 17-71
- Citations: 586 U.S. ___ (more) 139 S. Ct. 361; 202 L. Ed. 2d 269

Case history
- Prior: Markle Interests, LLC v. U.S. Fish & Wildlife Serv., 40 F. Supp. 3d 744 (E.D. La. 2014); affirmed, 827 F.3d 452 (5th Cir. 2016); rehearing denied, 848 F.3d 635 (5th Cir. 2017); cert. granted, 138 S. Ct. 924 (2018).

Questions presented
- Whether the Endangered Species Act prohibits designation of private land as unoccupied critical habitat that is neither habitat nor essential to species conservation. Whether an agency decision not to exclude an area from critical habitat because of the economic impact of designation is subject to judicial review.

Holding
- An area is eligible for designation as "critical habitat" under the Endangered Species Act of 1973 only if it is habitat for the listed species; and the decision by the secretary of the U.S. Department of the Interior not to exclude an area from critical habitat under 16 U. S. C. §1533(b)(2) is subject to judicial review.

Court membership
- Chief Justice John Roberts Associate Justices Clarence Thomas · Ruth Bader Ginsburg; Stephen Breyer · Samuel Alito; Sonia Sotomayor · Elena Kagan; Neil Gorsuch · Brett Kavanaugh

Case opinion
- Majority: Roberts, joined by Thomas, Ginsburg, Breyer, Alito, Sotomayor, Kagan, Gorsuch
- Kavanaugh took no part in the consideration or decision of the case.

Weyerhaeuser Company v. United States Fish and Wildlife Service, 586 U.S. ___ (2018), was a United States Supreme Court case. It dealt with the designation of 1544 acres of private land in St. Tammany Parish, Louisiana as "critical habitat" for the dusky gopher frog by the United States Fish and Wildlife Service under the Endangered Species Act of 1973. In a unanimous decision, the Supreme Court vacated the 5th Circuit Court of Appeals decision that upheld the designation and sent the case back for further review.

== Background ==
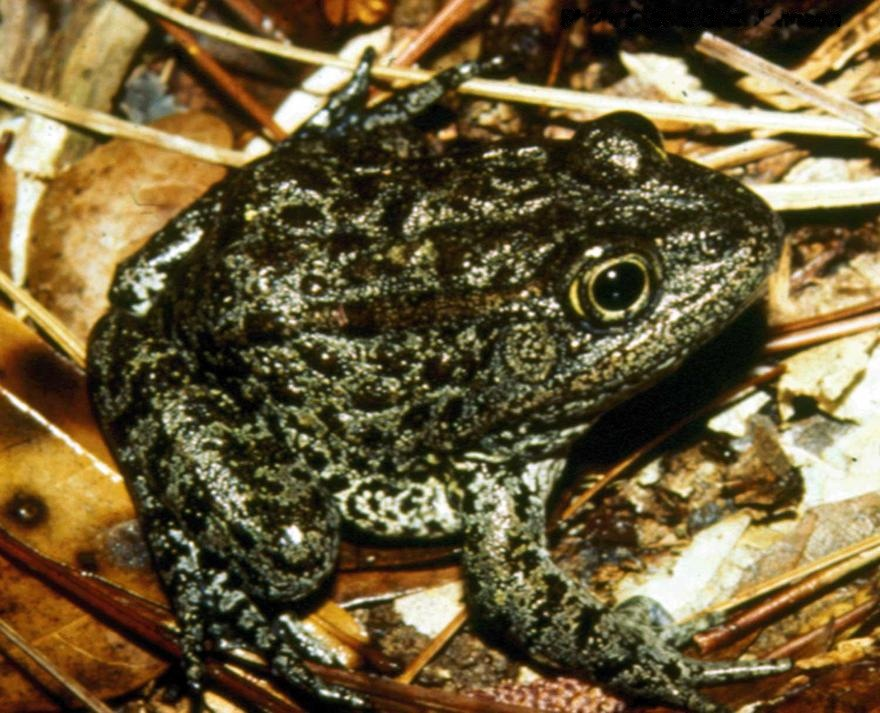
The dusky gopher frog

The dusky gopher frog is critically endangered due to habitat loss, numbering 135 as of 2015; the frog needs ephemeral ponds for breeding, and is only found around one pond in De Soto National Forest, Mississippi. In 2012, the United States Fish and Wildlife Service designated 1544 acres of land ("Unit 1") situated more than 50 miles from the pond in Mississippi where the frog resides as "critical habitat". The land, owned in part by timber company Weyerhaeuser and with the rest leased to them for harvesting timber, was last known to have the frogs in the 1960s. Under the Endangered Species Act of 1973, land that is not inhabited by a species but is "essential for the conservation of the species" can be classed as "critical habitat".

Unit 1 has five ephemeral ponds, which are of "remarkable quality" according to the Fish and Wildlife Service, but does not have open canopies, another required characteristic for it to be a habitat for the frogs. Weyerhaeuser argued that the land only has one of the required characteristics for being a habitat for the frog and that "Vast portions of the United States could be designated as critical habitat if a single feature used by an endangered species is present". The government, by contrast, said that it is feasible to transform Unit 1 into a habitat for the frogs and that there is no immediate impact of the designation, and cited multiple scientific studies to say that the land was vital for the conservation of the frog. It also argued that since the frog is only found in one area, transplanting the frog to other areas is necessary to prevent the extinction of the frog.

As the designation could cause $33 million in devaluation of the land over 20 years due to implications on possible future development, Weyerhaeuser and the land owner challenged the decision. Pacific Legal Foundation represented Markle Interests, the owner of some of the land that was leased to Weyerhaeuser and whose case was joined to Weyerheuser's before the Supreme Court. The Eastern District Court of Louisiana upheld the designation in 2013, and the 5th Circuit Court of Appeals affirmed it 2-1 in 2016, holding that the Fish and Wildlife Service was not arbitrarily designating Unit 1 as "critical habitat", and that while under the Endangered Species Act, the Fish and Wildlife Service "may exclude any area from critical habitat if [it] determines that the benefits of such exclusion outweigh the benefits of specifying such area as part of the critical habitat", a decision not to exclude based on economic impact was not subject to judicial review.

== Supreme Court ==
The Supreme Court agreed to hear the case in January 2018. Oral hearings occurred on October 1, 2018, prior to Justice Brett Kavanaugh's appointment to the Court.

The Court issued its unanimous decision on November 27, 2018, vacating the Appeals Court decision and sending the case back for further review. Chief Justice John Roberts, writing for the Court, instructed that the Court of Appeal must review the case in light of how the terms "habitat" and "critical habitat" are defined by the Endangered Species Act and the nature of how much degree of modification needs to be made to make a habitat a critical habitat, and to review the Service's decision not to exclude Area 1 from its cost and benefits analysis, as such decisions are eligible for judicial review.

== See also ==
- Pacific Legal Foundation
