= Ventura Fault =

Fault system of Southern California, U.S.

Coordinates: 34.3000°N 119.1500°W

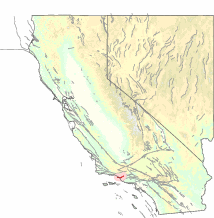
The Ventura Fault (in red), Southern California

Ventura Fault also Ventura-Pitas Point Fault is an offshore and onshore fault system of Southern California, beginning around Santa Barbara coming onshore in Ventura with an eastward heading, its extension is unknown but presumed to head for San Bernardino. It is among a network of faults in the area, potentially connecting to San Cayetano Fault, Lion Fault, and Red Mountain Fault (the latter offshore).

== Tsunami potential ==
California Geological Survey researchers have reported that the fault is capable of an 8.0 earthquake, along with tsunami affecting Santa Barbara, Ventura, and Santa Monica. A big earthquake on the fault estimated to occur every 400 to 2,400 years, the last being about 800 years ago. Pitas Point and Punta Gorda areas were "yanked out of the surf zone by large uplift events," growing between 16 feet to 26 feet suddenly.
