= Growth management =

Growth management, in the United States, is a set of techniques used by the government to ensure that as the population grows there are services available to meet their demands. Growth management goes beyond traditional land use planning, zoning and subdivision controls in both the characteristics of development influenced and the scope of government powers used. These are not necessarily only government services. Other demands such as the protection of natural spaces, sufficient and affordable housing, delivery of utilities, preservation of buildings and places of historical value, and sufficient places for the conduct of business are also considered.

== California studies ==
Jurisdictions throughout the United States have experimented with local growth management measures designed to limit the growth of residential or commercial development within their jurisdiction or to shift them to areas with less development. Glickfeld and Levine conducted two major studies of growth management measures in virtually all California cities and counties in 1988 and 1992. The first study inquired about 18 different types of growth management measures. The vast majority of the jurisdictions had adopted one or more growth management measures to affect residential, commercial or new development. These varied from requiring adequate service levels as a condition for receiving approval to construct residential or commercial developments to measures that reduced permitted residential density to measures that restricted the height of buildings or the floor area ratio on a given parcel. Typically, jurisdictions near the Pacific coastline had more restrictions than those in the interior of the state.

The second study showed that over the four-year period between the two surveys the cumulative effect of growth-management legislation showed no relationship to permitted construction values for California as a whole when controlling for population growth and interest rates.

However, a follow-up study showed that the measures helped displace new construction from the metropolitan areas to the interiors of the state with low income and minority populations being particularly impacted. That is, the measures did not affect overall construction levels in California but did affect where new construction was built.

== Comprehensive planning ==
The application of growth management techniques is often governed by the development of a comprehensive plan. The plan can be used to measure the impact that new growth will have on the community and define the method by which that impact is mitigated. Several states have adopted state measures to govern local growth management ordinances. Pioneers in statewide United States growth management were Oregon, which established Urban Growth Boundaries in the 1970s and Florida which passed the Growth Management Act in 1985.

== See also ==
- Adequate Public Facilities Ordinance
- Impact fee
- Smart growth
