= Real estate transfer tax =

Real estate transfer tax is a tax that may be imposed by states, counties, or municipalities on the privilege of transferring real property within the jurisdiction.

== Rates ==
In the USA, total transfer taxes can range between very small (for example, .01% in Colorado) to relatively large (4% in the city of Pittsburgh).

Some U.S. states have a variety of transfer tax laws which may include specific exemptions for certain types of buyers based on buying status or income level. For example, Maryland exempts certain "first time buyers" from a percentage of the total or excludes a portion of the property's sales price from taxation altogether.

Real estate transfer taxes have become controversial in some U.S. jurisdictions seeking to increase transfer taxes on higher end property sales to help combat issues like homelessness. 2022's Chicago's Bring Chicago Home initiative, seeks to increase transfer taxes on $1 million transactions by 253% or t o 2.65% or $26,500 per million dollar of sale value on both residential and commercial properties.

Another variation which exists is either the legal requirement to split the taxes between the parties or the local custom to do so. Thus, in Washington, DC, the 2.2% is generally split between the seller and the buyer.

== US States with no real estate transfer taxes ==
While many states levy a real estate transfer tax when a property title changes hands, several do not:

- Alaska
- Idaho
- Indiana
- Louisiana
- Kansas
- Mississippi
- Missouri
- Montana
- New Mexico
- North Dakota
- Oregon (most counties)
- Texas
- Utah
- Wyoming

== See also ==
- 1031 exchange, IRC 1031 Tax-Deferred Exchange
- Real estate economics
- Real estate pricing
- Housing bubble
- Stamp duty land tax in the United Kingdom
