= Inclusionary zoning =

Laws mandating a percentage of affordable units in new housing projects

Inclusionary zoning (IZ) is a type of urban planning intervention with the aim of increasing the supply of affordable housing. It is sometimes enacted through a local ordinance or development plan requiring (or providing incentives for) a percentage of units in real estate development be affordable by people with low to moderate incomes.

It is named in contrast to exclusionary zoning, which is zoning requirements (such as single-family zoning or minimum parcel or house sizes) that result in exclusion of low-income residents. Inclusionary zoning is the urban planning counterpart to 'affordable' housing. 'Affordable' housing has a specific meaning in Australia and the United States. In the US, "affordable housing developers" are non-profits which build 100% of their units as affordable, but need significant taxpayer subsidies for this model to work. While inclusionary zoning allows municipalities to build 'affordable' housing with no financial cost, they have an opportunity cost which is not a small subsidy.

The bulk of economic evidence indicates inclusionary zoning, without well-calibrated incentives, substantially restricts new housing supply and reduces overall affordability. The typical inclusionary zoning ordinance in California reduces annual new residential construction by 31.8%, and the cost of generating an affordable unit through IZ is approximately $800,000 (Note: In excess rents paid by other market rate renters, who are on average lower income). This is more than the cost of directly subsidizing housing in California, which is estimated to be $441,000.

Alternatives to unfunded inclusive zoning with the aim of improving housing affordability include funded (or "bonus") inclusionary zoning, providing rent controls, public housing, rent subsidies, or allowing more housing.

== Background ==
Non-profit affordable housing developers build 100% of their units as affordable, but need significant taxpayer subsidies for this model to work. Inclusionary zoning allows municipalities to have new affordable housing constructed without explicit taxpayer subsidies. In order to encourage for-profit developers to build projects that include affordable units, cities often allow developers to build more total units (a "density bonus") than their zoning laws currently allow so that there will be enough profit generating market-rate units to offset the losses from the below market-rate units and still allow the project to be financially feasible.

Inclusionary zoning can be mandatory or voluntary, though the great majority of units have been built as a result of mandatory programmes. There are variations among the set-aside requirements (percentage of units set-aside for low-income residents), affordability levels (what income level is considered "low-income"), and length of time the unit is deed-restricted as affordable housing.

In practice, these policies involve placing deed restrictions on 10–30% of new houses or apartments in order to make the cost of the housing affordable to lower-income households. The mix of "affordable housing" and "market-rate" housing in the same neighborhood may be seen as beneficial by city planners and sociologists. Another goal of inclusionary zoning is to build mixed-income communities, rather than having poor households concentrated in specific city neighborhoods.

Most inclusionary zoning is enacted at the municipal or county level; when imposed by the state, as in Massachusetts, it has been argued that such laws usurp local control. In such cases, developers can use inclusionary zoning to avoid certain aspects of local zoning laws.

== History ==
During the mid- to late-20th century, new suburbs grew and expanded around American cities as middle-class house buyers, supported by federal loan programs such as Veterans Administration housing loan guarantees, left established neighborhoods and communities. These newly populated places were generally more economically homogeneous than the cities they encircled. Many suburban communities enacted local ordinances, often in zoning codes, to preserve the character of their municipality. One of the most commonly cited exclusionary practices is the stipulation that lots must be of a certain minimum size and houses must be set back from the street a certain minimum distance. In many cases, these housing ordinances prevented affordable housing from being built, because the large plots of land required to build within the code restrictions were cost-prohibitive for modestly priced houses. Communities have remained accessible to wealthier citizens because of these ordinances, effectively shutting the low income families out of desirable communities. Such zoning ordinances have not always been enacted with conscious intent to exclude lower income households, but it has been the unintended result of such policies.

Supporters of inclusionary zoning point out that low income households are more likely to become economically successful if they have middle class neighbors as peers and role models. When effective, inclusionary zoning reduces the concentration of poverty in slum districts where social norms may not provide adequate models of success. Education is one of the largest components in the effort to lift people out of poverty; access to high-quality public schools is another key benefit of reduced segregation. Statistically, a poor child in a school where 80% of the children are poor scores 13–15% lower compared to environments where the poor child's peers are 80% middle class.

Income requirements for the "affordable" housing differ among jurisdictions where inclusive zoning is implemented. In California, 16% of the population could afford the median-priced home during 2005.

== Potential benefits ==
Expanding affordable housing may give poor and working families would access to a range of opportunities, including good employment opportunities, good schools, comprehensive transportation system and safe streets.

Some affordable housing advocates seek to promote the policies in order to ensure that housing is available for a variety of income levels in more places. These supporters hold that inclusionary zoning produces needed affordable housing and creates income-integrated communities.

Inclusionary zoning may alleviate the problem of inadequate supply of Affordable Housing

Affordable housing may avoid economic and racial segregation, which helps reducing crime rate, failing schools and improving social stability

Affordable housing requires relatively small amount of explicit subsidies required for adopting IZ as a market-based tool.

== Criticism ==
The bulk of the existing academic evidence indicates that mandatory IZ (without incentives), substantially restricts new housing supply, making affordability worse.

Inclusionary zoning may only have low production of affordable housings, which produced approximately 150,000 units over several decades in the United States. Other schemes, such as Housing Choice Vouchers (which assists approximately two million households) and the LIHTC program have produced over two million affordable homes

Inclusionary zoning may result in unstable production of affordable housing that highly affected by local housing-market conditions.

There is very little research on outcomes for participants in these programs. Although these affordable housing programs, by definition, offer lower-cost units that municipalities promote as inclusive, the deed restrictions imposed on participants in these programs result in additional economic disparities and other hardships not faced by market-rate homeowners.

Some advocates state that Inclusionary Zoning can have the opposite effect and actually reduce affordable housing in a community. For example, in Los Angeles, California, inclusionary zoning apparently accelerated gentrification, as older, unprofitable buildings were razed and replaced with mostly high-rent housing, and a small percentage of affordable housing; the net result was less affordable housing. In New York, NY, inclusionary zoning allows for up to a 400% increase in luxury housing for every unit of affordable housing and for an additional 400% luxury housing when combined with the liberal use of development rights. Critics have stated the affordable housing can be directed to those making up to $200,000 through the improper use of an Area Median Income, and used as political tools by organizations tied to various politicians. New York City communities such as Harlem, the Lower East Side, Williamsburg, Chelsea and Hell's Kitchen have experienced significant secondary displacement through the use of Inclusionary Zoning.

Real Estate industry detractors note that inclusionary zoning levies an indirect tax on developers, so as to discourage them from building in areas that face supply shortages. Furthermore, to ensure that the affordable units are not resold for profit, deed restrictions generally fix a long-term resale price ceiling, eliminating a potential benefit of home ownership.

Free market advocates oppose attempts to fix given social outcomes by government intervention in markets. They argue inclusionary zoning constitutes an onerous land use regulation that exacerbates housing shortages.

Homeowners sometimes note that their property values will be reduced if low income families move into their community. Others counter consider their concerns thinly-concealed classism and racism.

Local residents in Massachusetts begun a lawsuit fighting affordable housing projects.

Other legal battles have occurred in California, where many cities have implemented inclusionary zoning policies that typically require 10 percent to 15 percent of units to be affordable housing. The definition of affordable housing includes both low-income housing and moderate-income housing. In California, low-income housing is typically designed for households making 51 percent to 80 percent of the median income, and moderate-income housing is typically for households making 81 percent to 120 percent of the median income. Developers have attempted to fight back these requirements by challenging local inclusionary zoning ordinances through the court legal system. In the case Home Builders Association of Northern California v. City of Napa, the California First District Court of Appeal upheld the inclusionary zoning ordinances of City of Napa that require 10 percent of units of the new development project to be moderate income housing against the Home Builders Association that challenged the City of Napa. Cities have also attempted to impose inclusionary requirements on rental units. However, the Costa-Hawkins Rental Housing Act prohibits cities in California from imposing limitation on rental rates on vacant units. Subsequently, developers have won cases, such as Palmer/Sixth Street Properties, L.P. v. City of Los Angeles (2009), against cities that imposed inclusionary requirements on rental units, as the state law supersedes local ordinances.

Citizen groups and developers have also sought other ways to strengthen or defeat inclusionary zoning laws. For example, the initiative and referendum process in California allows citizen groups or developers to change local ordinances on affordable housing by popular vote. Any citizens or interest groups can participate in this process by gathering at least the required number of signatures so that the measure proposed can qualify to be on the ballot; once enough signatures are submitted and the ballot measure is cleared by election officials, the ballot measure is typically placed on the ballot for the upcoming election. One recent case is Proposition C in San Francisco. This ballot measure was placed on the ballot for the June 2016 California primary election. Passed in June 2016, this proposition amends the city's charter to increase the requirement for affordable housing for development projects of 25 units or more.

The clash between these various interests is reflected in this study published by the libertarian-leaning Reason Foundation's public policy think tank, and the response of a peer review of that research. Local governments reflect and in some cases balance these competing interests. In California, the League of Cities has created a guide to inclusionary zoning which includes a section on the pros and cons of the policies.

=== From economists ===
Economists state that IZ functions as a price control on a percentage of units and has similar negative effects as other price controls (rent control) being that it discourages the supply of new housing. It can also be understood similar to impact fees as an "inclusionary tax" on market-rate units which raises the prices of new non-price-controlled units in that development and thereby diminishes the financial incentive to create new housing.

== Differences in ordinances ==
Inclusionary zoning ordinances vary substantially among municipalities. These variables can include:

- Mandatory or voluntary ordinance. While many cities require inclusionary housing, many more offer zoning bonuses, expedited permits, reduced fees, cash subsidies, or other incentives for developers who voluntarily build affordable housing.
- Percentage of units to be dedicated as inclusionary housing. This varies quite substantially among jurisdictions, but appears to range from 10 to 30%.
- Minimum size of development that the ordinance applies to. Most jurisdictions exempt smaller developments, but some require that even developments incurring only a fraction of an inclusionary housing unit pay a fee (see below).
- Whether inclusionary housing must be built on site. Some programs allow housing to be built nearby, in cases of hardship.
- Whether fees can be paid in lieu of building inclusionary housing. Fees-in-lieu allow a developer to "buy out" of an inclusionary housing obligation. This may seem to defeat the purpose of inclusionary zoning, but in some cases the cost of building one affordable unit on-site could purchase several affordable units off-site.
- Income level or price defined as "affordable," and buyer qualification methods. Most ordinances seem to target inclusionary units to low- or moderate-income households which earn approximately the regional median income or somewhat below. Inclusionary housing typically does not create housing for those with very low incomes.
- Whether inclusionary housing units are limited by price or by size (the City of Johannesburg for example provides for both options)
- Appearance and integration of inclusionary housing units. Many jurisdictions require that inclusionary housing units be indistinguishable from market-rate units, but this can increase costs.
- Longevity of price restrictions attached to inclusionary housing units, and allowable appreciation. Ordinances that allow the "discount" to expire essentially grant a windfall profit, similar to what market-rate owners would get. Municipalities dislike this because it would mean they would have to create more affordable units. Instead, participants in these programs subsidize themselves, relieving municipalities of the financial burden to keep these programs running. However, placing the brunt of the work and subsidies on the people in these programs raises questions. It can trap individuals in public housing programs, making it nearly impossible for them to move out until they pass away. If they could not afford market-rate housing 15 years ago, staying in a unit that restricts appreciation becomes a significant barrier to leaving public housing. In addition, requiring participants to do maintenance and take on all other homeowner liabilities on a home that is economically similar to a rental (since there is limited appreciation minus HOA fees, interest, taxes, etc.) can add further housing related stress.
- Whether housing rehabilitation counts as "construction," either of market-rate or affordable units. Some cities, like New York City, allow developers to count rehabilitation of off-site housing as an inclusionary contribution.
- Which types of housing construction the ordinance applies to. For example, high-rise housing costs more to build per square foot (thus raising compliance costs, perhaps prohibitively), so some ordinances exempt it from compliance.

=== Locations of housing ===
IZ policies may not effectively disperse low-income units throughout the region. In Suffolk County, there is a spatial concentration of IZ units in poor neighbourhoods. 97.7% of the IZ units were built in only 10% of the census tract from 1980 to 2000, which is the area with the lowest-income neighbourhood coupled with clustering of minorities. Housing policies are controlled by local government rather than regional government in Suffolk County, New York, which may not consider inter-municipality distribution of low-income households. Density bonuses given to property developers for the provision of IZ units have intensified the concentration of affordable units in poor neighborhood (Ryan & Enderle as cited in Mukhija, Das, Regus et al., 2012).

== Usage ==
=== Johannesburg, South Africa ===
On 21 Feb 2019, the City of Johannesburg Council approved its "Inclusionary Housing Incentives, Regulations and Mechanisms 2019". The policy is the first of its kind in South Africa and provides four options for inclusionary housing (including price limited, size limited or negotiated options) where at least 30% of dwelling units in new developments of 20 units or more, must be inclusionary housing.

=== United States ===
More than 200 communities in the United States have some sort of inclusionary zoning provision.

Mandatory inclusionary housing (MIH) laws introduced in 2016 require that 20-30% of residential floor area in new developments and some renovations to be "permanently affordable for low-and moderate-income New Yorkers". The units may be offered for rent or for sale.

Montgomery County, Maryland, is often held to be a pioneer in establishing inclusionary zoning policies. It is the sixth wealthiest county in the United States, yet it has built more than 10,000 units of affordable housing since 1974, many units door-to-door with market-rate housing.

All municipalities in the state of Massachusetts are subject to that state's General Laws Chapter 40B, which allows developers to bypass certain municipal zoning restrictions in those municipalities which have fewer than the statutorily defined 10% affordable housing units. Developers taking advantage of Chapter 40B must construct 20% affordable units as defined under the statute.

All municipalities in the state of New Jersey are subject to judicially imposed inclusionary zoning as a result of the New Jersey Supreme Court's Mount Laurel Decision and subsequent acts of the New Jersey state legislature.

A 2006 study, found that 170 jurisdictions in California had some form of inclusionary housing. This was a 59% increase from 2003, when only 107 jurisdictions had inclusionary housing. In addition, state law requires that 15% of the housing units produced in redevelopment project areas must be affordable. At least 20% of revenue generated from a redevelopment project must be contributed to low-income and moderate-income housing. However, Governor Jerry Brown passed AB 1X 26 that dissolved all redevelopment agencies on February 1, 2012.

However, Los Angeles, California's inclusionary zoning ordinance for rental housing was invalidated in 2009 by the California Court of Appeal for the Second Appellate District because it directly conflicted with a provision of the state's Costa-Hawkins Rental Housing Act of 1996 which specifically gave all landlords the right to set the "initial rental rate" for new housing units.

Madison, Wisconsin's inclusionary zoning ordinance respecting rental housing was struck down by Wisconsin's 4th District Court of Appeals in 2006 because that appellate court construed inclusionary zoning to be rent control, which is prohibited by state statute. The Wisconsin Supreme Court declined the city's request to review the case. The ordinance was structured with a sunset in February 2009, unless extended by the Common Council. The Common Council did not extend the inclusionary zoning ordinance and therefore it expired and is no longer in effect.

=== Australia ===
Inclusionary zoning has been implemented to some degree in various states, especially in South Australia and New South Wales. Some policies are also in place in the Australian Capital Territory and Victoria (State).

The City of Sydney has mandated affordable housing in specified zones through the City West Scheme.

=== United Kingdom ===
There is a long established inclusionary planning system (Section 106 agreements) in the UK.

== Types of inclusionary zoning ==
=== Mandatory inclusionary zoning ===
Some studies have shown mandatory approaches would be crucial to the success of inclusionary zoning programs in terms of providing a larger number of affordable housing. Below are some examples showing the greater effect of mandatory practice over voluntary practice:

Municipality or County	Under voluntary practice	Under mandatory practice
Cambridge, MA	Cannot generate any affordable housing within 10 years	Switching to a mandatory program in 1999, 135 housing units were produced and 58 more were in production as of June 2004.
Irvine, CA	Confusion and uncertainty were found under a voluntary program that motivated developers to initiate a switch to a mandatory ordinance.	A new mandatory ordinance, enforced in 2003 with uniform expectations and rewards for developers, led to the creation of 3,400 affordable housing units, with 750 more planned in June 2004.
Orange County, CA	952 units were built over eleven years (1983–1994).	6,389 units of affordable housing were built within four years (1979–1983)

== See also ==
- Affordable housing
- Residential segregation
- Exclusionary zoning
- Subsidized housing
- Non-profit housing
- NIMBY
- YIMBY
