= Reverse sensitivity =

Reverse sensitivity is a term from the New Zealand planning system.

It describes the impacts of newer uses on prior activities occurring in mixed-use areas. Some activities tend to have the effect of limiting the ability of established ones to continue. A key instance is the impact of new residential development on mixed use neighbourhoods as an area goes through a process of gentrification. Such prior uses might be entertainment, commercial or industrial uses. New residents tend to have expectations of a level of amenity comparable to suburban residential areas and will complain about noise from established uses. This has previously had the effect of imposing economic burdens or operational limitations on the prior uses that reduce their viability, forcing them to close down or move. The concept of reverse sensitivity suggests that a reversal of this approach is possible and that the burden of providing residential amenity in mixed-use environments should fall to the developers of new residential buildings in those areas. Planning schemes can regulate these issues via zoning ordinances.
