= Nollan v. California Coastal Commission =

- Supreme Court of the United States

Argued March 30, 1987 Decided June 26, 1987
- Full case name: Nollan et ux. v. California Coastal Commission
- Citations: 483 U.S. 825 (more) 107 S. Ct. 3141; 97 L. Ed. 2d 677; 1987 U.S. LEXIS 2980; 55 U.S.L.W. 5145; 26 ERC (BNA) 1073; 17 ELR 20918

Case history
- Prior: 177 Cal.App.3d 719, 223 Cal.Rptr. 28 (App. 2d Dist. 1986); probable jurisdiction noted, 479 U.S. 913 (1986).

Holding
- A governmental exaction has to be substantially related to a legitimate government interest and there must be a nexus between the exaction and that interest.

Court membership
- Chief Justice William Rehnquist Associate Justices William J. Brennan Jr. · Byron White; Thurgood Marshall · Harry Blackmun; John P. Stevens · Sandra Day O'Connor; Antonin Scalia

Case opinions
- Majority: Scalia, joined by Rehnquist, White, Powell, O'Connor
- Dissent: Brennan, joined by Marshall
- Dissent: Blackmun
- Dissent: Stevens, joined by Blackmun

Laws applied
- U.S. Const. amend. V

Nollan v. California Coastal Commission, 483 U.S. 825 (1987), is a United States Supreme Court decision that ruled a California Coastal Commission regulation which required private homeowners to dedicate a public easement along valuable beachfront property as a condition of approval for a construction permit to renovate their beach bungalow unconstitutional. The petitioners, James and Marilyn Nollan, were represented by Pacific Legal Foundation, a public interest law firm, and the respondent, the California Coastal Commission, was represented by counsel from the California Attorney General's Office. The Coastal Commission had asserted that the public-easement condition was a legitimate state interest of diminishing the "blockage of the view of the ocean" caused by the home renovation. The Court held that in evaluating such claims, there must be an "essential nexus" between a legitimate state interest and the actual conditions of the permit being issued.

In a 5–4 ruling, the Supreme Court ruled that a requirement by the CCC was a taking in violation of the Takings Clause of the Fifth Amendment, as incorporated against the states by the Fourteenth Amendment.

== Facts ==
The Nollans owned beachfront property in Ventura County, and wished to replace a 504-square-foot (46.8 m^{2}) bungalow which had fallen into disrepair with a 2,500-square-foot (230 m^{2}) house. As a condition for permits to do so, the California Coastal Commission required that the Nollans dedicate for 20 years a strip of land along the beach in front of their house to allow the public the right of pass and re-pass along the beach (to be enacted only when a public agency agreed to accept management of the ambulatory lateral-access easement). 43 neighbors had granted such easements without litigation; the Nollans, however, believed that the demand was an unconstitutional taking of their property without just compensation, and filed a petition for writ of administrative mandamus asking the Ventura County Superior Court to invalidate the easement stipulation. The CCC argued that the new house would increase blockage of the ocean view and contribute to a "wall of residential structures" which would prevent the public "psychologically from realizing a stretch of coastline exists nearby that they have every right to visit". The Nollans could offset this burden to the public, the CCC argued, by providing additional access to the beach in the form of a dedicated access easement along the beachfront side of their property. The Superior Court ruled in favor of the Nollans, declaring "the Commission could impose access conditions on development permits for replacement homes only where the proposed development would have an adverse impact on public access to the sea, and this requirement was not met".

The property in question was located along Faria Beach in Ventura County, which was sparsely developed (in contrast to the 35-foot (11 m), three-story homes along the Malibu beaches where development of the "psychological impediment to public access" argument first occurred). Article X, Section 4 of the California Constitution guaranteed access to the beaches, but a prospective beach-goer might have had difficulty seeing the beach or finding public access to it. The walling-off effect, the argument went, created a psychological impediment to public access ensuring that no members of the public would be able to utilize a public resource (access to which is guaranteed by the state constitution). The development pattern, in effect, took a public resource supposedly available to anyone and turned it into the private enclave of the wealthy property owners whose houses lined the beach.

The "psychological impediments to public access" became a popular finding in staff reports analyzing projects before the California Coastal Commission, particularly when a proposed development had only a minor physical impact to access by the public but required (for legal adequacy for the staff report and California's Environmental Quality Act and Coastal Act) rational bases for imposition of conditions to help make a proposed development consistent with the environmental laws of the state.

The Nollans' property did not present the same conditions found along beaches in Malibu, being less than 4% developed and having smaller, less-intensive development than that along the Malibu shoreline. The condition for approval of the Nollans' Coastal Development Permit was that the applicants record an offer to dedicate a strip of property (generally 25 feet (7.6 m) wide and located landward of the mean high tide)—or, more generally, from the actual edge of the water on any particular day during any given tide along the beach.

== Prior procedure ==
The CCC subsequently appealed to the California Courts of Appeal; the court ruled in its favor, finding “imposition of an access condition on a development permit was sufficiently related to burdens created by the project to be constitutional". The court also held that the Nollans' taking claim failed because the condition did not deprive them of all reasonable use of their property. The Nollans appealed to the United States Supreme Court, raising only the constitutional question.

== Issue ==
The issue before the court was whether the imposition by the CCC of the requirement that the Nollans convey a public easement as a condition for granting a land-use permit constituted a taking.

== Reasoning ==
Justice Scalia delivered the decision of the Court: “The lack of nexus between the condition and the original purpose of the building restriction converts that purpose to something other than what it was...Unless the permit condition serves the same governmental purpose as the development ban, the building restriction is not a valid regulation of land use but an out-and-out plan of extortion".

In writing for the Court's majority, Justice Antonin Scalia derided the concept of psychological impediments to public access; he wrote that if a public agency wishes to place conditions of approval on a permit, that those conditions must bear some relation to the public-policy concerns purported to be resolved through the imposition of conditions of approval. For example, if a project eliminates 120 square feet (11 m^{2}) of public parkland, an appropriate condition would be to require replacement in-kind of the 120 square feet (11 m^{2}) to maintain the size of public parkland. In short, there had to be a nexus between the public-policy issue and the condition of approval which sought to address it. Justice Scalia then pointed out that under the ruling, a public-access condition did not meet that nexus test by compensating for the slight loss of public view across the Nollans' property; he then stated that if loss of public views across the Nollans' property was truly the issue, then an appropriate condition of approval would have been "construction of a public viewing platform on the roof of the Nollans' house".

The public had no right of passage with the existing bungalow in place, so it would be unaffected by the larger structure replacing it. The Court specified that a “close nexus” must be shown between the regulatory condition imposed and the development impacts of concern, and that the regulatory action must “substantially advance legitimate state interests” (AADASDF p 53). Although the case appears to deal primarily with takings, the principles are applied to the exaction and impact-fee debate as well. The Court struck down California’s policy of “anything goes” for exaction requirements, and created the rational-nexus standard for states across America.

== Later implications ==
In Dolan v. City of Tigard, the Court evaluated further the degree of the connection required. In that case, the City of Tigard, Oregon required any business owner seeking to substantially expand onto property adjacent to a floodplain to create a public greenway and bike path from private land in order to prevent flooding and traffic congestion. The Supreme Court ruled that the city’s requirement would be a taking if the city did not show that there was a reasonable relationship between the creation of the greenway and bike path and the impact of the development. "Without question, had the city simply required petitioner to dedicate a strip of land along Fanno Creek for public use, rather than conditioning the grant of her permit to redevelop her property on such a dedication, a taking would have occurred", the Court held. “Such public access would deprive petitioner of the right to exclude others, one of the most essential sticks in the bundle of rights that are commonly characterized as property".

== See also ==
- List of United States Supreme Court cases, volume 483
- List of United States Supreme Court cases
