= Dolan v. City of Tigard =

- Supreme Court of the United States

Argued March 23, 1994 Decided June 24, 1994
- Full case name: Florence Dolan, Petitioner v. City of Tigard
- Citations: 512 U.S. 374 (more) 114 S. Ct. 2309; 129 L. Ed. 2d 304; 1994 U.S. LEXIS 4826

Case history
- Prior: Appeal from the Supreme Court of Oregon, 854 P.2d 437 (1993); cert. granted, 510 U.S. 989 (1993).

Holding
- The city's zoning ordinance was not roughly proportionate to the city's public purpose in such a way to justify infringing upon the property owner's rights.

Court membership
- Chief Justice William Rehnquist Associate Justices Harry Blackmun · John P. Stevens; Sandra Day O'Connor · Antonin Scalia; Anthony Kennedy · David Souter; Clarence Thomas · Ruth Bader Ginsburg

Case opinions
- Majority: Rehnquist, joined by O'Connor, Scalia, Kennedy, Thomas
- Dissent: Stevens, joined by Blackmun, Ginsburg
- Dissent: Souter

Laws applied
- U.S. Const. amend. V

Dolan v. City of Tigard, 512 U.S. 374 (1994), more commonly Dolan v. Tigard, is a United States Supreme Court case. It is a landmark case regarding the practice of zoning and property rights, and has served to establish limits on the ability of cities and other government agencies to use zoning and land-use regulations to compel property owners to make unrelated public improvements as a condition to getting zoning approval, citing the violation of the Fifth Amendment’s Takings Clause.

== Facts ==
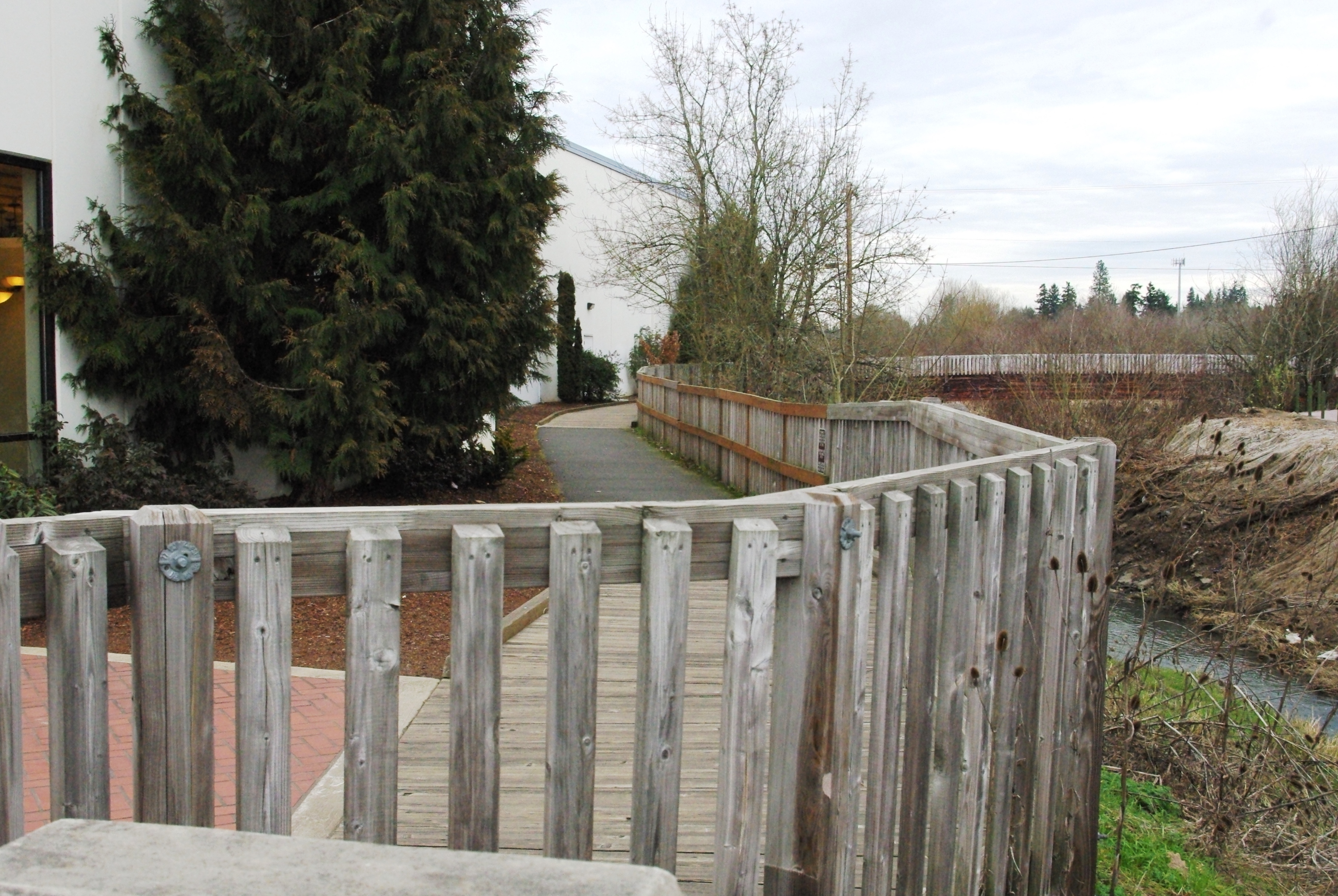
Bike path at issue

Florence Dolan, owner and operator of A-Boy Plumbing & Electrical Supply store in the city of Tigard, Oregon, applied for a permit to expand the store and pave the parking lot of her store. The city planning commission granted conditional approval, dependent on Dolan dedicating land to a public greenway along an adjacent creek, and developing a pedestrian and bicycle pathway in order to relieve traffic congestion. The decision was appealed to the Oregon State Land Use Board of Appeals (LUBA), alleging that the land dedication requirements were not related to the proposed development, and thus constituted an uncompensated taking of her property, which is disallowed by the Fifth Amendment. LUBA found a reasonable relationship between the development and both conditions of the variance, as the larger building and paved lot would increase runoff into the creek, and the impact of increased traffic justified the requirement for a pathway. The decision was subsequently affirmed by the Oregon State Court of Appeals and the Oregon Supreme Court. The case was appealed to the Supreme Court of the United States.

== Decision ==
The Supreme Court overturned the state Land Use Board of Appeals and the Oregon appellate courts. The Court held that under the doctrine of unconstitutional conditions, a government agency may not require a person to surrender constitutional rights in exchange for discretionary benefits, where the property sought has little or no relationship to the benefit conferred. A two-prong test was applied: Whether or not there is an "essential nexus" between the permit conditions and legitimate state interest, and whether or not the degree of the exactions required by the permit condition bears the required relationship to the projected impact of the proposed extra development.

The Court held that the first condition had been satisfied. However, the Court ruled that the City failed to make an individualized determination that the required dedications are related, in both nature and extent, to the proposed impact. Further, the Court held that the requirement for a public greenway (as opposed to a private one, to which Dolan would retain other rights of property owners, such as the right of exclusive access), was excessive, and that the City failed to meet its burden of establishing that the proposed pathway was necessary to offset the increased traffic which would be caused by the proposed expansion.

== See also ==
- Nollan v. California Coastal Commission
- List of United States Supreme Court cases, volume 512
- List of United States Supreme Court cases
- Lists of United States Supreme Court cases by volume
- List of United States Supreme Court cases by the Rehnquist Court
