= Impact fee =

An impact fee is a fee that is imposed by a local government within the United States on a new or proposed development project to pay for all or a portion of the costs of providing public services to the new development. Impact fees are considered to be a charge on new development to help fund and pay for the construction or needed expansion of offsite capital improvements. These fees are usually implemented to help reduce the economic burden on local jurisdictions that are trying to deal with population growth within the area.

== History ==
Impact fees were first implemented in Hinsdale, Illinois in 1947. To finance a water treatment plant expansion, Hinsdale Sanitary District president John A. McElwain implemented a "tap-in" fee of $50 per new residential sewer line. The sanitary district was sued by the Illinois Home Building Association, but the district prevailed. The case was appealed to the Illinois Supreme Court and that court ruled that impact fees are legal if used for capital expenditures, but not legal if used for operating expenses.

Impact fees became more widely accepted in the United States in the 1950s and 1960s. First used to help fund capital recovery fees for water and sewer facilities, then in the 1970s, with the decline of available Federal and State grants for local governments, their use increased and expanded to non-utility uses including roads, parks, schools, and other public services. Golden v. Planning Board of Ramapo and Construction Industry Association of Sonoma County v. The City of Petaluma, California are the legal basis for the use of impact fees to finance public infrastructure throughout the United States. Finally, in the 1980s the impact fee became a universally used funding approach for services and started to include municipal facilities such as fire, police, and libraries. After court cases in states such as Florida and California approved their legal use, many other states enacted laws which approved the use of impact fees by local jurisdictions.

Impact fees have developed as an offspring of in lieu fees but have had a more significant effect on funding infrastructure. In some cases, the use of the impact fee has developed its own phrase of "growth should pay its own way".

== In lieu fee ==
The use of impact fees originated in environmental law practices and in lieu fees. In lieu fees are different from impact fees and are not as flexible because they relate only to required dedications where they can be appropriately used. Because the use of the in lieu fee may not always be efficient, planners and cities are now turning to impact fees as a more appropriate way to collect money for facilities and services. Impact fees can be more easily applied to needed infrastructure or facilities while in lieu fees cannot. Impact fees can be applied before new development is started or completed, which may allow costs to be transferred to future residents in the area. Another advantage of using an impact fee compared to the in lieu fee is that it can be applied to any new construction from single family homes, apartments, and even commercial development. In lieu fees may not always be as easily applied to any specific zone. Finally, impact fees can be implemented earlier than in lieu fees so that the capital need matches the need for services.

== Implementation and legal basis ==
There are two main rationales that focus on how to implement impact fees. The first focuses on recognizing that the fees are positive exactions of funds for a community and should be used in that manner. Second, impact fees should be used for any need in the community. At the time when impact fee usage first started people argued whether they should just focus on utility types or include other types of special services of facilities. Some argued for just utility types because only the people paying the actual fee would receive the service. This is known as a closed ended use. An open ended use, such as parks or libraries, allows anyone to use the service, even if they have not directly paid for the service. Still people argue and believe that development can affect all services and should help contribute to them. When it comes to implementing impact fees there is a legal basis that must be considered or followed in order for legal implementation. They must follow the rational nexus and roughly proportional rules or guidelines. There must be a connection between the new development and the need for the new facilities in the region. Also, the impact fee must be able to benefit the person paying the fee along with calculating the fee on a fair proportionate formula for all residents. One main dilemma with implementing the fee is characterized as the exclusiveness of benefit. It focuses on determining who should pay for what in the case of impact fees. Some may have to pay for the fee, but may not get to use the service which can be seen as a tax, but by using impact fees on people that cause the need for the new service it helps to not cause a tax on everyone and allows those that are not using the service to be excluded from paying the fee.

== Function ==
Impact fees have become the most important method in infrastructure financing and an essential part of local governments to fund infrastructure or public services. Impact fees may help to assist in the development of needed parks, schools, roads, sewer, water treatment, utilities, libraries, and public safety buildings to the newly developed area. In most cases impact fees are used in new development. An example of this would be when a new neighborhood or commercial development is constructed the developer may be forced to pay the fee for new infrastructure or a new fire station in the area due to the demand the new development causes. In some cases the developer may pass on the fee to the future property owners through housing costs or charges. It can be seen as a growth management tool that collects development funding payment as a way to exercise police power. Impact Fees are seen as a regulation tool, but at the same time their revenue raising purpose can be seen as a tax to some. Still most states recognize and allow the use of impact fees as a way to regulate land use.

The cost of an impact fee can vary from state to state. Generally, areas in the Western United States charge higher fees than other places in the country. They can also vary depending on the type of need by a community with school facilities causing the greatest cost of an impact fee.

Impact fees can also be classified under different regional terms. Early on, they were known as "capital recovery" or "expansion fees". In states such as Oregon, they are known as "system development charges", while in North Carolina they are known as "facility fees". All impact fees function on the same premise regardless of regional terminology.

Today, impact fees have become a widely used method. About 60% of all cities with over 25,000 residents along with 40% of metropolitan counties use impact fees on new developments for public services or infrastructure. In some states such as Florida, 90% of communities use impact fees. Twenty-six US states have implemented the use of impact fees in the western portion of the country, along the Atlantic coast, and within the Great Lakes region.

== Court cases ==
Court cases along the way have dealt with the issue of impact fees. Two main cases that dealt with impact fees development have been Pioneer Trust and Savings Bank v. Mount Prospect and Gulest Associate Incorporated v. Newburgh. Another is Krupp versus Breckenridge Sanitation District, where the Colorado Supreme Court found that a wastewater impact fee was lawful and not subject to a takings analysis. The U.S. Constitution's Takings Clause was found to apply to an impact fee by the U.S. Supreme Court in Koontz v. St. Johns River Water Management District. In Sheetz v. County of El Dorado, the U.S. Supreme Court ruled 9-0 that impact fees required by local legislation are subject to heightened scrutiny and are required to meet the doctrine of unconstitutional conditions. According to the ruling, impact fees must be directly related to and proportional to the development's impact.

== Linkage fees ==
Since impact fees have been so widely accepted with cities, counties, and states they have helped to lead to the development and encroachment of other types of regulatory fees. The two main examples of fees that impact fees have paved the way for are linkage fees and mitigation fees.

Linkage fees are levied in some states (such as Massachusetts, New Jersey, and California) on nonresidential and market-rate multifamily residential projects, normally upon receipt of the building permit or prior to construction. Linkage fees are a derivative of development impact fees and are exacted on developers by some cities and countries to pay for a number of facilities and services. Arguments against linkage fees are similar to impact fees, including the question of whether local governments have the right to enact these types of programs.

== Mitigation fees ==
Mitigation fees are similar to impact and linkage fees but they differ in that their focus is on the environment. These fees are charged to reimburse or compensate the community for the negative impact that development may have on the community.

== Effect on affordable housing ==
Impact fees were found to decrease affordable housing by increasing the housing development cost. Developers of new housing who pay the fees pass the cost of the fees onto the future property owners or renters. In some cases proceeds from impact and linkage fees are used to fund the construction of affordable housing residential developments.

== Criticism ==
Impact fees are accepted forms of financing in many communities in the country. Still, their use is not universally accepted, and the use of impact fees as a means to collect revenue is still controversial in many communities. One argument against impact fees is that they may constrain and hurt the local economy. The argument includes the assertion that they may serve as a de facto tax which can have a result of slowing or ending development in an area and instead cause investment in other areas that do not levy impact fees. Another concern is that the negative effect that they may have on a local economy may directly hurt job growth and reduce the number of jobs that are available in an area.

== See also ==
- Economic development
- Exaction
- Public finance
- Taxation
- Value capture
