= List of people executed in Nevada =

The following is a list of people executed by the U.S. state of Nevada.

== Post-Gregg ==
A total of 12 people convicted of murder have been executed by the state of Nevada since 1976. The first execution was carried out by gas chamber; subsequent executions were carried out by lethal injection. All but one (Richard Allen Moran) waived their appeals and asked that the execution be carried out.

No.	Name	Race	Age	Sex	Date of execution	County	Method	Victim(s)	Governor
1	Jesse Walter Bishop	White	46	M	October 22, 1979	Clark	Gas chamber	David Ballard	Robert List
2	Carroll Edward Cole	White	47	M	December 6, 1985	Clark	Lethal injection	Marie Cushman (Note: Was also convicted of 4 other murders, 3 of which were in Texas.)	Richard Bryan
3	William Paul Thompson	White	51	M	June 19, 1989	Washoe	Lethal injection	Randy Waldron (Note: Was also convicted of 2 murders in California.)	Bob Miller
4	Sean Patrick Flanagan	White	28	M	June 23, 1989	Clark	Lethal injection	Albert Duggens and James Lewandowski	Bob Miller
5	Thomas E. Baal	White	26	M	June 3, 1990	Clark	Lethal injection	Frances Maves	Bob Miller
6	Richard Allen Moran	White	42	M	March 30, 1996	Clark	Lethal injection	Sandra Devere, Russell Rhodes, and Linda VanderVoort	Bob Miller
7	Roderick Abeyta	Hispanic	44	M	October 5, 1998	Clark	Lethal injection	Donna Martin	Bob Miller
8	Alvaro Calambro	Asian	25	M	April 5, 1999	Washoe	Lethal injection	Peggy Crawford and Keith Christopher	Kenny Guinn
9	Sebastian Stephanous Bridges	White	37	M	April 21, 2001	Clark	Lethal injection	Hunter Blatchford	Kenny Guinn
10	Lawrence Colwell Jr.	White	35	M	March 26, 2004	Clark	Lethal injection	Frank Rosenstock	Kenny Guinn
11	Terry Jess Dennis	White	57	M	August 12, 2004	Washoe	Lethal injection	Ilona Straumanis	Kenny Guinn
12	Daryl Linnie Mack	Black	47	M	April 26, 2006	Washoe	Lethal injection	Betty Jane May (Note: Was previously convicted of murdering Kim Parks.)	Kenny Guinn

=== Demographics ===
Race
White	9	75%
Asian	1	8%
Black	1	8%
Hispanic	1	8%
Age
20–29	3	25%
30–39	2	17%
40–49	5	42%
50–59	2	17%
Sex
Male	12	100%
Date of execution
1976–1979	1	8%
1980–1989	3	25%
1990–1999	4	33%
2000–2009	4	33%
2010–2019	0	0%
2020–2029	0	0%
Method
Lethal injection	11	92%
Gas chamber	1	8%
Governor (Party)
Mike O'Callaghan (D)	0	0%
Robert List (R)	1	8%
Richard Bryan (D)	1	8%
Bob Miller (D)	5	42%
Kenny Guinn (R)	5	42%
James Gibbons (R)	0	0%
Brian Sandoval (R)	0	0%
Steve Sisolak (D)	0	0%
Joe Lombardo (R)	0	0%
Total	12	100%

== Pre-Furman ==
=== Between 1861 and 1903 ===
Between late 1861, when Nevada Territory was organized, and 1903, executions by hanging were conducted at the county seats in which the person was convicted.

There has not been a definitive compilation of legal executions conducted in Nevada prior to 1903, however there are 20 known legal executions between 1861 and 1903:

Name	Date of execution	County
Allen Milstead	April 24, 1868	Dayton
John Milleain (Millan, Millian, or Milliean), murdered Julia Bulette.	April 24, 1868	Virginia City
Rufus B. Anderson	October 30, 1868	Austin
Ah Fung	December 16, 1870	Unionville
Ah Ung	December 16, 1870	Unionville
David M. Hall	October 17, 1873	Belmont
John Stewart	April 24, 1874	Aurora
John Murphy	December 29, 1874	Carson City (at the foot of Lone Mountain)
Peter Larkin	January 19, 1877	Virginia City
Robert Crozier	October 30, 1877	Winnemucca
Sam Mills	December 22, 1877	Elko
J. W. Rover	February 19, 1878	Reno
Charles Wesley Hymer	April 6, 1880	Winnemucca
Charley Hing	February 9, 1882	Winnemucca
Indian Dave	January 23, 1885	Belmont
Clarence Gray	March 5, 1886	Winnemucca
Edward Crutchley	December 31 1886	Hamilton
Elizabeth Potts	June 20, 1890	Elko
Josiah Potts	June 20, 1890	Elko
Hank Parish	December 12, 1890	Ely

=== 1903–1921: People executed at the state capital ===
The 1901 state legislature required that all executions be conducted at the State Prison in Carson City beginning in 1903.

The 1911 state legislature provided that a death row inmate could elect to die by shooting or hanging.

Name	Date of execution	Method
John Hancock	September 8, 1905	Hanging
Thomas F. Gorman	November 17, 1905	Hanging
Al Linderman	November 17, 1905	Hanging
Fred Reidt	November 17, 1905	Hanging
John P. Sevener	November 17, 1905	Hanging
Indian Johnny	December 7, 1906	Hanging
Joe Ibapah	December 7, 1906	Hanging
Charley Kaiser	May 25, 1909	Hanging
George Williams	August 24, 1909	Hanging
Andriza Mircovich	May 14, 1913	Firing squad (Machine)

=== 1921–1976: Nevada State Prison gas chamber ===
Prior to January 1, 1912, the law prescribed hanging as the means of carrying out the death sentence in the State of Nevada, however, upon revision of the statutes in 1911 the condemned were allowed a choice between the gallows and the firing squad. This remained the law until March 28, 1921 when an amendment was adopted providing for execution by means of lethal gas. Nevada was the first state to sanction the use of the gas chamber.

The first execution by use of lethal gas took place in February 1924 and has been used as the means of carrying out the death sentence a total of thirty-one times. The last execution was held October 22, 1979.

Name	Race	Age	Sex	Date of execution	Victim(s)
Gee Jon	Asian	28	M	February 8, 1924	Tom Quong Kee
Stanko Jukich	White	29	M	May 21, 1926	Jennie Medak
Robert H. White	White	41	M	June 2, 1930	Louis LaVell
Luis Ceja	Hispanic	28	M	September 4, 1931	Charlie Fong
John Hall	White	52	M	November 28, 1932	John O'Brien
Ray Elmer Miller	White	34	M	May 8, 1933	Evelyn Miller
Joseph Behiter	White	34	M	July 13, 1934	Sylvia Reither
Luther Jones	White	33	M	January 26, 1937	Manuel Arrascada, Walter Godecke, Otto Heitman, and John Elias
Domenico Nadal	Hispanic	47	M	January 17, 1939	Joe Urrutia
Burton Franklin Williamson	White	43	M	November 21, 1939	Pauline Williamson
Wilson Henry Boyd	Black	44	M	May 28, 1940	Floyd Robinson and Georgianna Robinson
John A. Kramer	White	64	M	August 28, 1942	Frances Jones
Floyd L. McKinney	White	34	M	November 27, 1943	Raymond Fisher and Marion Fisher
Raymond Plunkett	White	31	M	June 30, 1944	Baby son Plunkett
Floyd Loveless	White	17	M	September 29, 1944	A.H. Berning
Albert Everette Sala	White	35	M	August 23, 1946	Albert McCollum
Paul Maynard Skaug	White	36	M	January 10, 1947	Marie Voss
David Blackwell	White	19	M	April 22, 1949	Detective Cap. LeRoy Geach and Detective Sgt. Allen Glass
Laszlo Varga	White	23	M	June 7, 1949	Billie Rhae Morning
Eugene Leo Gambetta	White	46	M	October 18, 1949	Thelma Ribail
James Williams	Black	32	M	August 25, 1950	Abraham Gutierrez and Louis Evans
Theodore William Gregory	White	46	M	January 29, 1951	Margaret Tarr
Owen Caudle Butner	White	36	M	February 10, 1951	Mildred Butner
Gregorio Arellano	Hispanic	28	M	July 24, 1951	Esperanza Rodriguez
Domingo Echaverria	Hispanic	62	M	November 13, 1952	Elizabeth Catlett
Clayton Octave Fouquette	White	41	M	April 13, 1953	Donald Brown
Ferdinand A. Bourdlais	White	27	M	April 23, 1954	Ward Budzien Sr.
Leroy L. Linden	White	33	M	July 15, 1954	Clarence Dodd
Frank A. Pedrini	White	46	M	July 15, 1954	Clarence Dodd
Earl Lewis Steward	White	42	M	February 24, 1960	Thomas Jessen
Thayne H. Archibald	White	22	M	August 21, 1961	Albert Waters

== See also ==
- Capital punishment in Nevada
- Capital punishment in the United States
- List of homicides in Nevada
