= List of Nevada state prisons =

This is a list of state prisons in Nevada operated by the Nevada Department of Corrections.

The only federal prison in Nevada is Federal Prison Camp, Nellis, closed in 2005.

This list does not include county jails located in the state of Nevada.

== Institutions ==
Institution	County or city	Notes
Casa Grande Transitional Housing	Clark	
Ely State Prison	White Pine	Nevada's execution chamber
High Desert State Prison	Clark	Nevada's men's death row
Lovelock Correctional Center	Pershing	
Nevada State Prison	Carson City	Closed on May 18, 2012
Northern Nevada Correctional Center and Stewart Conservation Camp	Carson City	
Northern Nevada Transitional Housing	Washoe	
Southern Desert Correctional Center	Clark	
Southern Nevada Correctional Center	Clark	Closed in 2008
Florence McClure Women's Correctional Center	Clark	Previously known as Southern Nevada Women's Correctional Facility
Florence McClure Women's Correctional Center	Clark	Houses Nevada’s women’s death row
Warm Springs Correctional Center	Carson City	Closed in November 2022, but may be reopened
