= Scott Dozier =

American murderer (1970–2019)

- Born: Scott Raymond Dozier; November 20, 1970; Boulder City, Nevada, U.S.
- Died: January 5, 2019 (aged 48); Ely State Prison, near Ely, Nevada, U.S.
- Cause of death: Suicide by hanging
- Children: One
- Status: Deceased
- Convictions: Arizona; Second degree murder Nevada; First degree murder Robbery
- Penalty: Arizona; 22 years imprisonment (2005); Nevada; Death (2007)

Details
- Victims: Jeremiah Miller (Nevada); Jasen "Griffin" Greene (Arizona)
- Date: April 18, 2002 (Nevada); July 27, 2001 (Arizona)

Scott Raymond Dozier (/ˈdoʊʒər/; November 20, 1970 – January 5, 2019) was a convicted American murderer on death row in Nevada for the 2002 murder of 22-year-old Jeremiah Miller, who was one of Dozier's drug associates. He would have been the first inmate executed by the state of Nevada in more than 10 years, but died by suicide in prison before this could take place.

== Background ==
Scott was born on November 20, 1970, in Boulder City, Nevada. His father worked for federal water projects throughout the American West and he had two siblings. He graduated from high school in 1989.

Dozier enlisted in the Army on November 16, 1990, and was honorably discharged on August 10, 1992. He married Angela Drake, whom he had begun dating in high school, on New Year’s Day in 1991, and their son, Ashton, was born in 1993. Eventually, the couple divorced. By his mid-20s, he was making much of his income from the production and sale of methamphetamine, during the course of which he would alternate between Nevada and Arizona, the two states in which he was convicted of murder. Dozier had commented on his enjoyment of "living outside the law" in the months leading up to his scheduled execution.

== Murders ==
On April 18, 2002, Jeremiah Miller met Dozier at La Concha, a motel on the Las Vegas Strip. Dozier had promised to help Miller buy ephedrine, a key ingredient in the production of methamphetamine. Miller had brought $12,000 in cash for that purpose. Upon Miller's arrival at La Concha, Dozier killed him, sawed Miller's body into multiple pieces, stuffed most of them into a suitcase, and disposed of it near an apartment complex in western Las Vegas. The suitcase was discovered by a worker the following week. Miller's head and arms were never found. Dozier was arrested on June 25, 2002, in Phoenix, Arizona. During the police investigation, it was revealed that Dozier went on a spending spree after he had allegedly stolen Miller's $12,000, telling his friends that he'd won the cash at a casino.

Subsequently, he was also connected to the July 27, 2001, murder of Jasen "Griffin" Greene, whose decomposed remains were found in the desert north of Phoenix. Dozier allegedly shot Greene at a trailer in Carefree, Arizona, because Greene threatened to expose Dozier's methamphetamine operation. Doug Powell, a former drug associate of Dozier's, notified police of Greene's murder and confessed that he and another man had helped Dozier dispose of Greene's remains. During his trial, Dozier argued that he had not killed Greene but found his dead body when he returned to the trailer. According to Dozier, he decided not to inform the police about Greene's death as it would expose his methamphetamine production.

Furthermore, Powell claimed that Dozier had been in contact with him regarding Jeremiah Miller's murder. Dozier confided in Powell that he 'fucked up' by forgetting to remove a tattoo located on Miller's back, which was one of the tattoos that helped Las Vegas Police link Miller to a missing persons report. During his trial for the murder of Miller, Dozier argued that there was a lack of physical evidence to prove that he had murdered Miller. However, the prosecution argued that Dozier had told several witnesses about his murders. One witness claimed that they saw Miller's decapitated body in Dozier's hotel room along with an electric saw and other tools.

Dozier received a 22-year sentence in 2005 for killing Greene. After being extradited to Nevada, he stood trial for Miller's murder. He was convicted of the murder in September 2007; he received a death sentence on October 3, 2007, which was upheld by the Nevada Supreme Court on January 23, 2012. However, Dozier died by suicide before the state could carry out the sentence.

== Psychological evaluation ==
The psychologists who assessed Dozier during his convictions concluded that he had traits of antisocial personality disorder and displayed narcissistic tendencies such as arrogance, superficial charm, manipulativeness, and a grandiose sense of self-worth.

== Attempts to expedite execution ==
On October 31, 2016, Dozier voluntarily waived his appeals and wrote a letter to District Judge Jennifer Togliatti asking her to expedite his execution. Ten days later, on November 10, the Nevada Department of Corrections publicly announced the completion of the new lethal injection chamber at Ely State Prison, following the closure of the Nevada State Prison in Carson City on May 18, 2012, which had housed the state's former gas chamber which had been converted to be compatible with lethal injections. Dozier was transferred from Carson City to Ely in September 2011. In a hearing on July 27, 2017, Judge Togliatti signed Dozier's death warrant, permitting his execution to take place "in the week of October 16, 2017".

Following a hearing on August 17, 2017, Dozier's execution was pushed back to the week of November 13, 2017, with the Department of Corrections scheduling the execution for 8 p.m. on November 14. On November 9, 2017, Judge Togliatti stayed Dozier's execution at the request of his lawyers so the state's proposed lethal injection plan could be appealed. This was the first execution to be scheduled in seven years in Nevada since Tamir Hamilton was scheduled for execution on August 16, 2010, for raping and killing a 16 year-old girl. Hamilton's execution was stayed to allow him to pursue further appeals.

On June 19, 2018, Judge Togliatti signed a new death warrant for Dozier, permitting his execution to take place in the week beginning Monday, July 9, 2018. The following day, Nevada Department of Corrections spokeswoman Brooke Santina confirmed that the state had the necessary drugs with which to execute Dozier, and also that the execution had been tentatively scheduled for Wednesday, July 11, 2018, at 8 p.m. Clark County District Court Judge Elizabeth Gonzalez halted the execution on Wednesday morning, hours before it was scheduled to proceed, in response to a challenge by New Jersey–based pharmaceutical firm Alvogen that it does not want its product midazolam used in executions; Pfizer and Sandoz also objected to the use of their drugs (fentanyl and cisatracurium besilate, respectively) but did not join Alvogen's lawsuit.

A court hearing regarding Alvogen's case was scheduled for September 10, 2018, in which Alvogen sought to prevent the use of midazolam in any lethal injection execution. Alvogen asserted that the Nevada Department of Corrections fraudulently obtained one of its sedatives to be used in the execution, and also filed a temporary restraining order to prevent its product from being used in executions. Lawyers for Alvogen claim the manufacturer will "suffer irreparable harm to its reputation as a company that produces life-enhancing and life-saving drugs if Defendants [i.e. the state of Nevada] are allowed to misuse its product midazolam". Sandoz subsequently joined Alvogen in seeking the prevention of any of their drugs being used in an execution. State prison officials responded to Alvogen's successful stay of the execution and filed a motion requesting to vacate the order on August 7, 2018. The case continued in the Nevada Supreme Court and outgoing Attorney General Adam Laxalt made a filing in December 2018 that stated that if businesses could prevent their drugs being used for executions then it would mean the end of capital punishment in the state. A date had not been set for the hearing in 2019 and it was unclear if incoming Attorney General Aaron D. Ford would continue the appeal.

Had the execution gone ahead, Dozier would have been the first inmate executed by the state of Nevada in more than a decade. The last inmate executed in Nevada was convicted murderer Daryl Mack, who was executed on April 26, 2006, at Nevada State Prison.

== Death ==
Dozier had been on suicide watch for several months. According to his lawyers, his mental state had deteriorated due to deprivation of personal belongings and outside contact. On January 5, 2019, Dozier was found dead in his death-row cell at the Ely State Prison in Ely, Nevada, by prison officials, having hanged himself from a bed sheet attached to an air vent in the cell. He was pronounced dead at 16:35. Dozier was 48 years old at the time of his death.

== See also ==
- Capital punishment in Nevada
- Capital punishment in the United States
