= Chester Stiles =

American child rapist

- Mugshot of Stiles after his capture in 2007
- Born: Chester Arthur Stiles; September 14, 1970 (age 56); Louisville, Kentucky, U.S.
- Other name: Chet
- Status: Incarcerated at Ely State Prison
- Convictions: Lewdness with a child under the age of 14 (10 counts); Sexual assault with a minor under 14 (11 counts); Attempted sexual assault with a minor under 14
- Penalty: 21 life sentences with the de jure possibility of parole after 140 years (Note: Stiles will never be eligible for parole within his lifetime, as it is guaranteed he will be dead by his earliest release date.)

Chester "Chet" Arthur Stiles (born September 14, 1970) is an American criminal who gained notoriety after he appeared in video clips of himself raping and sexually abusing a girl who was three years old at the time. The video was made in 2003 but was discovered under a fallen sign in 2007 in Pahrump, Nevada. Both the FBI and the Las Vegas Police launched a nationwide manhunt which led to his capture. Police released the video to the media, and the child's mother recognized her daughter; Stiles was living with them at the time the video was recorded. He was caught in Henderson, Nevada, and appeared in court on October 17, 2007. Further investigation showed Stiles had abused another young girl while living with her family.

On May 29, 2009, Stiles was sentenced to 21 life sentences on 21 counts with the possibility of parole in 140 years. The judge said that he showed no remorse in the hearing; Stiles responded to the sentence with the claim that his prosecution "shows a child's virtue is more important than a man's life." He continued, "I incurred 21 life sentences for a non-violent act ... I wish the truth was more important." As of 2015 his sentence was one of the world's longest.

Once he got to the Nevada Department of Corrections, he was classified (Offender ID Number: 1036868) and placed in protective custody for his own safety from the prison's general population inmates.
