= Capital punishment in Nevada =

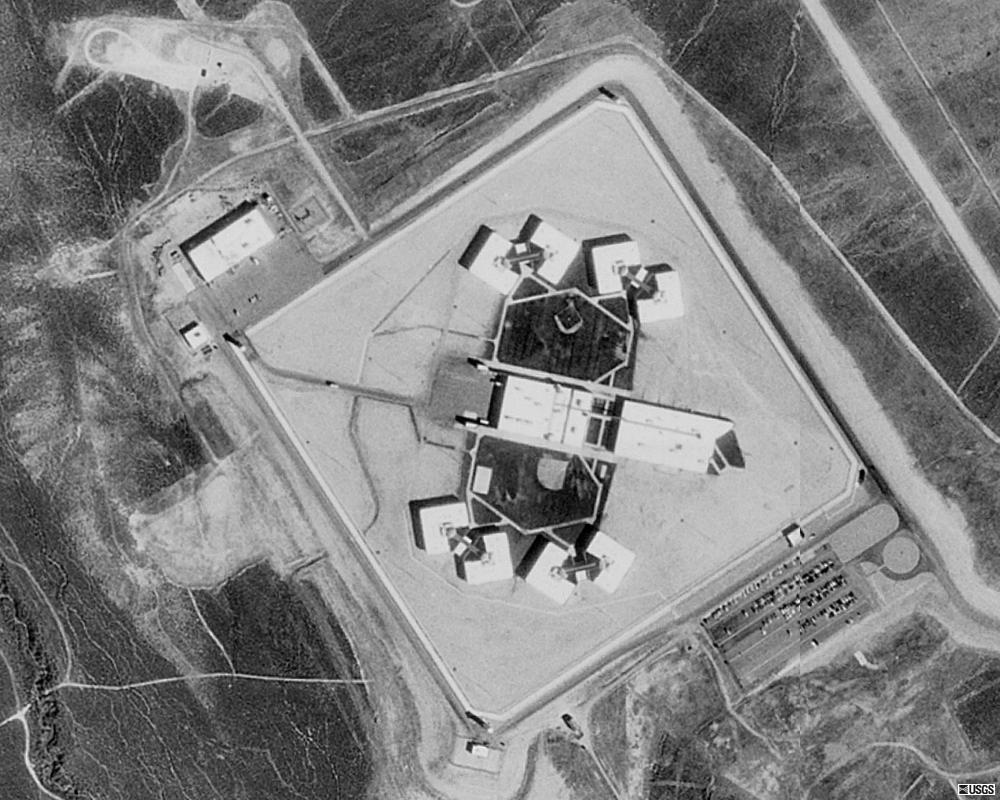
Ely State Prison, where all condemned inmates are executed.

Capital punishment is a legal penalty in the U.S. state of Nevada.

The last person executed in the state was convicted murderer Daryl Mack in 2006. There have been no executions in Nevada since then, in part because of a shortage of drugs used in executions by lethal injection.

== History ==
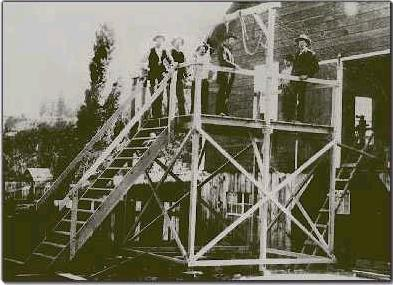
A hanging that took place in Nevada. Hanging was the method used for most executions before that of Gee Jon in 1924.

The first recorded execution in the area that is now Nevada was the hanging of John Carr for murdering Bernhard Cherry of Carson City on November 30, 1860, and the first recorded legal execution in the Nevada Territory was the hanging of Allen Milstead outside Dayton for killing Lyon County Commissioner T. Varney at Ragtown. Since the reinstatement of capital punishment in 1976, 12 people have been executed by the state. The most recent execution was in 2006, when Daryl Mack was executed for murder. As of June 2024, There are 51 people on death row in Nevada prisons.

Elizabeth Potts, who was hanged in 1890, was the only woman legally executed in the state, alongside her husband Josiah Potts, for the murder and partial dismemberment of Miles Faucett.

Hanging was the method prescribed by law from 1860 to 1921. The venue of executions moved from the counties to Nevada State Prison in 1903. In response to Mormon preferences, the Nevada State Legislature passed a statute in 1910 that became effective in January 1911, allowing condemned prisoners to choose between execution by shooting or hanging. On May 14, 1913, Andriza Mircovich became the only inmate in Nevada to be executed by shooting. After the warden of Nevada State Prison was unable to find five men to form a firing squad, a shooting machine was built to carry out Mircovich's execution. A law in 1921 made the gas chamber the sole means of execution. It was used from the 1924 execution of Gee Jon to the 1979 execution of Jesse Bishop, both at Nevada State Prison. A total of 32 men were executed by gas chamber in Nevada between this time. Lethal injection became the sole method of execution in Nevada by 1985, starting with the execution of 47 year old Carroll Edward Cole.

The use of cyanide gas in Nevada was used as a plot device in the short story "Nevada Gas" by Raymond Chandler.

In April 2021, the Nevada Assembly passed a bill that would have repealed the capital punishment statute. However, the state senate did not act on the matter after Governor Steve Sisolak said that he believes some crimes deserve the death penalty, suggesting that he would veto the bill.

== Legal process ==
When the prosecution seeks the death penalty, the sentence is decided by the jury and must be unanimous.

In case of a hung jury during the penalty phase of the trial, the judge has discretion to order a retrial or impose a life sentence.

Under the Nevada Constitution, clemency can be granted by the governor of Nevada with advice and consent of a board on which he sits, and also includes justices of the state supreme court and the state attorney general.

Lethal injection is the only method of execution in Nevada.

== Capital crimes ==
First degree murder can be punished by death if it involves one of the following aggravating factors:

1. The murder was committed by a person under sentence of imprisonment.
2. The murder was committed by a person who, at any time before a penalty hearing is conducted for the murder, is or has been convicted of:
  - Another murder and the provisions of subsection 12 do not otherwise apply to that other murder; or
  - A felony involving the use or threat of violence to the person of another and the provisions of subsection 4 do not otherwise apply to that felony.
3. The murder was committed by a person who knowingly created a great risk of death to more than one person by means of a weapon, device or course of action which would normally be hazardous to the lives of more than one person.
4. The murder was committed while the person was engaged, alone or with others, in the commission of, or an attempt to commit or flight after committing or attempting to commit, any robbery, arson in the first degree, burglary, invasion of the home or kidnapping in the first degree, and the person charged:
  - Killed or attempted to kill the person murdered; or
  - Knew or had reason to know that life would be taken or lethal force used.
5. The murder was committed to avoid or prevent a lawful arrest or to effect an escape from custody.
6. The murder was committed by a person, for himself or another, to receive money or any other thing of monetary value.
7. The murder was committed upon a peace officer or firefighter who was killed while engaged in the performance of his official duty or because of an act performed in his official capacity, and the defendant knew or reasonably should have known that the victim was a peace officer or firefighter. For the purposes of this subsection, "peace officer" means.
8. The murder involved torture or the mutilation of the victim.
9. The murder was committed upon one or more persons at random and without apparent motive.
10. The murder was committed upon a person less than 14 years of age.
11. The murder was committed upon a person because of the actual or perceived race, color, religion, national origin, physical or mental disability, gender identity or expression or sexual orientation of that person.
12. The defendant has, in the immediate proceeding, been convicted of more than one offense of murder in the first or second degree. For the purposes of this subsection, a person shall be deemed to have been convicted of a murder at the time the jury verdict of guilt is rendered or upon pronouncement of guilt by a judge or judges sitting without a jury.
13. The person, alone or with others, subjected or attempted to subject the victim of the murder to nonconsensual sexual penetration immediately before, during or immediately after the commission of the murder.
14. The murder was committed on the property of a public or private school, at an activity sponsored by a public or private school or on a school bus while the bus was engaged in its official duties by a person who intended to create a great risk of death or substantial bodily harm to more than one person by means of a weapon, device or course of action that would normally be hazardous to the lives of more than one person.
15. The murder was committed with the intent to commit, cause, aid, further or conceal an act of terrorism.

== Death row ==
The men's death row in Nevada is located at High Desert State Prison. The death row for women is in the Florence McClure Women's Correctional Center (previously Southern Nevada Women's Correctional Center).

The execution chamber, which opened in 2016, is located at Ely State Prison. Prior to 2016, executions by the state of Nevada were still designated to be carried out in the former gas chamber at the otherwise closed Nevada State Prison. Due to a lack of elevator access, this former gas chamber was not compliant with the Americans with Disabilities Act of 1990 (ADA). Greg Cox, the director of the Nevada Department of Corrections, stated that he anticipated a legal challenge to carrying out the execution there if an execution date is set. That, and the inconvenience of re-opening the prison to conduct an execution at the only place the law allowed, led to the construction of the new execution chamber at Ely and the amendment of the law, making it the new sole place for executions. There was some local humor about the old place of execution being closed because it was unsafe.

Of the twelve people executed in Nevada since the reinstatement of capital punishment, all but one of them (Richard Allen Moran) had waived their appeals. There were also cases of prisoners committing suicide while on death row, some of whom had earlier expressed their wish to be executed, like Duc Cong Huynh (1995) and Scott Dozier (2019).

== See also ==
- List of people executed in Nevada
- List of death row inmates in the United States § Nevada
- Crime in Nevada
- Law of Nevada
