= John Gregovich House =

Historic house in Nevada, United States

- U.S. National Register of Historic Places
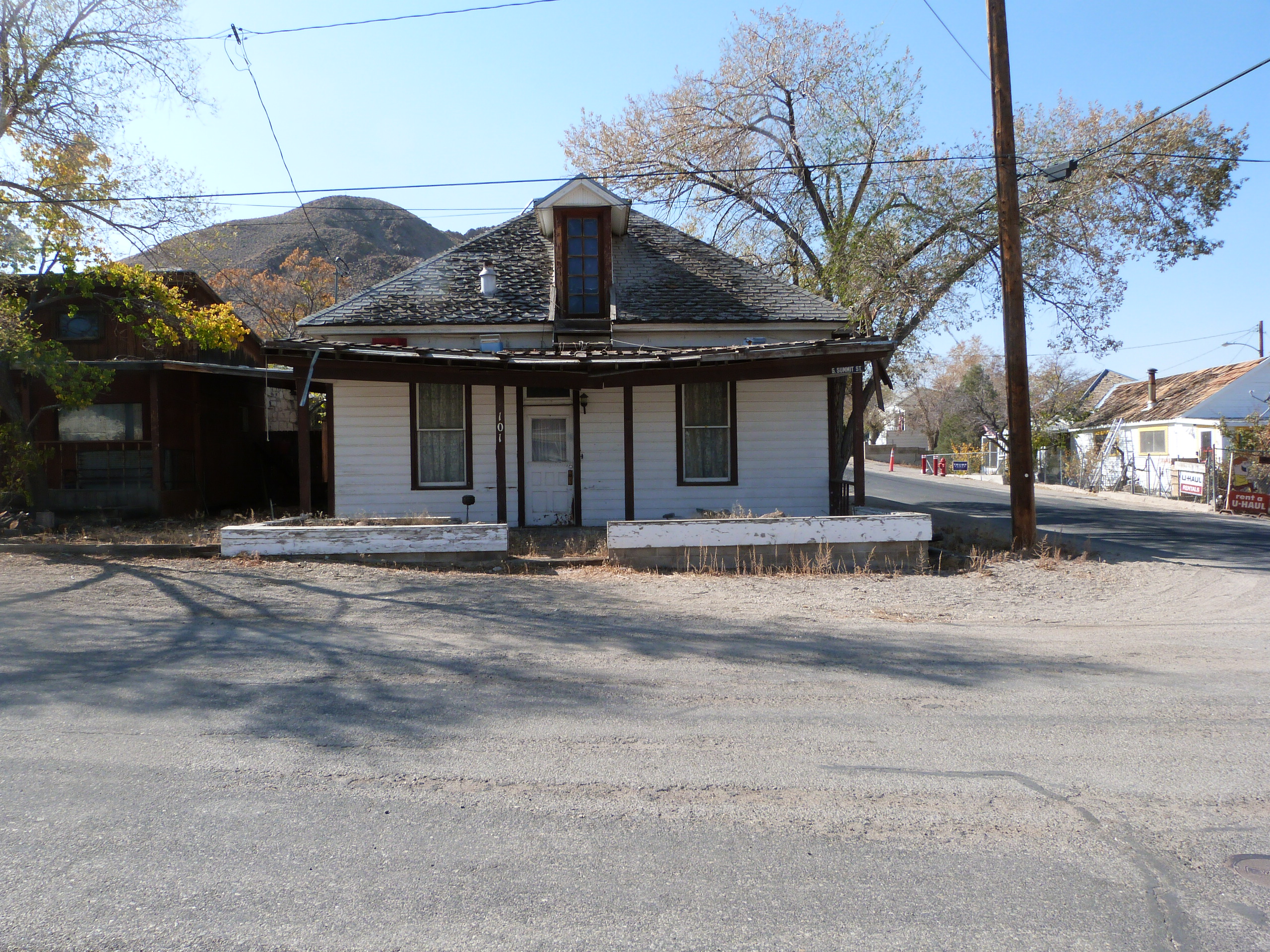
- Exterior view, 2020

- Location within Nevada Location within the United States
- Location: 101 Summit, Tonopah, Nevada
- Coordinates: 38.06755°N 117.23265°W
- Area: less than one acre
- Built: 1906
- Architectural style: Neo-Colonial
- MPS: Tonopah MRA
- NRHP reference No.: 82003232
- Added to NRHP: May 20, 1982

The John Gregovich House, at 101 Summit in Tonopah, Nevada, United States, is a historic house built in 1906 that is listed on the National Register of Historic Places. Like the Zeb Kendall House, also built in Tonopah in 1906 and also NRHP-listed, it is of Neo-Colonial style.

It was deemed significant for its architecture and for its association with Tonopah merchant and member of the Nevada Senate John Gregovich, who built the house at about the time he established his business on Main Street. The house was converted later to be used as a boarding house, in the 1920s.

It was listed on the National Register of Historic Places in 1982.
