= William Paul Thompson =

American serial killer (1938–1989)

- Thompson leaving court after a judge ruled him mentally competent to waive his appeals (June 14, 1989)
- Born: May 2, 1938; Wichita Falls, Texas, U.S.
- Died: June 19, 1989 (aged 51); Nevada State Prison, Carson City, Nevada, U.S.
- Cause of death: Execution by lethal injection
- Other names: "Bud"; Dale H. Brabson
- Convictions: Nevada; First degree murder California; First degree murder Second degree murder
- Penalty: Nevada; Death; California; Life imprisonment

Details
- Victims: 3–6
- Span of crimes: March 25 – April 21, 1984 (known)
- Country: United States
- States: California, Nevada (convicted); New York, Kansas, Oklahoma (confessed)
- Date apprehended: April 21, 1984

William Paul "Bud" Thompson (May 2, 1938 – June 19, 1989) was an American serial killer and self-described contract killer. Convicted for murders of three men committed between March and April 1984 in California and Nevada, he later confessed to three additional murders (which remain unsubstantiated) in three other states. Sentenced to death for a Nevada killing, he withdrew his appeals and was subsequently executed in 1989.

== Early life ==
William Paul Thompson was born on May 2, 1938, in Wichita Falls, Texas, but moved to New York with his family at an early age. His father, William Webb Thompson, was a violent alcoholic who beat his family during his drinking binges, causing his son to grow resentful of his father and start drinking and stealing at age 12, for which he was sent to reform school. Throughout his life, Thompson was repeatedly incarcerated in both state and federal institutions for crimes including burglary, forgery, safecracking and counterfeiting. He claimed to have criminal records in New York, Florida, Texas, Pennsylvania, Georgia and Kansas. When he was not behind bars, Thompson traveled around the county and found employment in various odd jobs such as boxing and working for Salvation Army.

Thompson married sometime during the 1970s, but the marriage was short-lived as his wife died of cancer in 1982. After this, he grew more violent, and claimed that he committed his first murders shortly after, but this has never been definitively confirmed.

== Murders ==
On March 25, 1984, Thompson and a fellow transient, 44-year-old Robert Herman Boyle, were drinking at the Murderer's Bar, located about 4 miles northeast of Auburn, California. In the bar, they met brothers Robert and John Pariset, 35 and 28 respectively, who were in the area for fishing and gold panning. They befriended and drank alcohol with the pair, but unbeknownst to the brothers, Thompson informed Boyle was informed that he was getting annoyed with the two men due to their noisy motorcycles and Robert's drunkenness. Boyle took little notice of his friend's warning. Later in the evening, the four men went to Thompson and Boyle's campsite to drink tequila and smoke marijuana. Boyle and John Pariset then went to the camper van to get some sleeping bags, leaving Robert and Thompson alone. When they returned, they found Robert lying on the ground and incorrectly assumed that he had fallen asleep. In reality, he’d actually been fatally shot by Thompson. When Boyle left again for additional blankets, he heard a gunshot. Returning to the campsite, Boyle discovered that Thompson had shot John in the head with a .22 revolver, and was rummaging through both brothers' pockets.

After coming to an agreement not to turn each other over to the police, the pair travelled to Winnemucca, Nevada, where they parted ways. By that time, an arrest warrant had been issued for the two men, as a 15-year-old local had told the authorities that he had seen them leave the crime scene. Boyle headed to Salt Lake City, Utah while Thompson continued towards Reno, committing multiple robberies along the way. On April 21, he was waiting to hop a train near the Sands Hotel at the camp of 28-year-old unemployed transient Randy Waldron. Deciding that he needed cash and a false ID, Thompson pulled out his pistol and shot Waldron in the head four times. He then rifled through his pockets and fled. Half an hour later in the same area, he attempted to rob two women, Barbara Johnson and Susan Black, at gunpoint. Much to his surprise, the pair fought back, with Johnson throwing a tire iron at him and Black hitting him with her handbag, causing him to flee. Not long after, Thompson was detained by the authorities for the attempted robberies as they had recognized the distinctive tattoos on his knuckles.

== Trials and imprisonment ==
Days after his capture, Thompson was positively identified as Waldron's killer through his gun, whose bullets were found to be a match to those found at the crime scene, as well as them finding some of Waldron's personal possessions on him. Since he was still in Nevada's jurisdiction, it was decided that he would first be tried for Waldron's murder, while Boyle (who had been arrested earlier in the week in Salt Lake City) had already been extradited to the Placer County Jail. On April 25, Thompson was charged with murder, assault with a deadly weapon, attempted robbery and carrying a concealed weapon.

In the meantime, Boyle, who had been charged in the Auburn homicides, pleaded not guilty to the murder charges, with his first court hearing set to take place on May 2. The hearings were later delayed, as the judge ruled it would be appropriate to first see the outcome of Thompson's trial in Nevada before they take action. The trial officially began on September 17, 1984, with the prosecutors announcing from get-go that they would seek the death penalty against Thompson. During the proceedings, prosecutor Jerry Mowbray described the defendant as a "[...] psychopathic killer, a man who likes to kill", while Thompson's attorney, Richard Campbell, tried to portray Randy Waldron, a convicted felon, as the aggressor, claiming that he had attacked his client during a sudden rage induced by inhaling paint fumes, and the killing was done in self-defense. The latter's claims were found to be implausible by the jury, who, after a week-long trial, returned a verdict of guilty on all charges for Thompson. On September 27, he was sentenced to death, which Thompson appeared to receive rather calmly, as he was seen patting his attorney on the back and thanking him for the hard work until he was led out of the room. His execution date was set for December of that year, but as per procedure, it was automatically appealed to the court system.

In early December, Thompson was extradited to California and detained at Folsom State Prison to await trial for the murders of the Parisets. By that time, it was determined that Boyle had little to no actual involvement in the killings, and as part of a deal struck with the prosecutor, he would testify against Thompson in exchange for immunity. At the trial, Boyle recounted the whole events as he had experienced, indicating that Thompson killed both men to get rid of them as well as to rob them. Throughout the proceedings, Thompson appeared disinterested, reading a paperback book and discussing how good the food on Nevada's death row was, before entering a guilty plea for the double murder at the end of the trial. Before the sentence could be applied, his lawyer requested that Thompson undergo medical tests to determine whether he had brain lesions that might have affected his judgment at the time of the crimes, which was accepted. No such lesions were found, and Thompson was subsequently sentenced to a 25-year-to-life term, before being returned to Nevada's death row.

== Execution ==
In the following years, Thompson dropped all of his appeals, both state and federal, stating he wished to die with dignity. For the remainder of his years on death row, he became religious and received a formal education in law. On the day before his execution, he granted his first and only interview to a reporter for the Associated Press via telephone, in which he explained his reasons for dropping his appeals and retelling his life story. In that interview, he also confessed to carrying out three contract murders in New York, Kansas and Oklahoma, with the last one being of a federal prosecutor who had convicted his prison acquaintances. However, he did not name the victims or the people who hired him, claiming that the bodies will never be found. Oklahoma State Attorney Tony Graham later said that he was not aware of any prosecutor going missing in the state, stating that he found the confession to be "preposterous".

On June 19, 1989, Thompson was executed via lethal injection at the Nevada State Prison. He spent the last hours of his life talking to the prison chaplain and another death row inmate, and just before entering the chamber, guards reported that his last words were "Thank you for letting me die with dignity."

== See also ==
- Capital punishment in Nevada
- List of people executed by lethal injection
- List of people executed in Nevada
- List of people executed in the United States in 1989
- List of serial killers in the United States

== Bibliography ==
- Jay Robert Nash (July 10, 1992). World Encyclopedia of 20th Century Murder. M. Evans & Company. p. 563. ASIN B014IRGT2S.

Executions carried out in Nevada
Preceded by Carroll Cole December 6, 1985	William Paul Thompson; June 19, 1989	Succeeded by Sean Flanagan June 23, 1989
Executions carried out in the United States
Preceded by Michael Lindsey – Alabama May 26, 1989	William Paul Thompson – Nevada; June 19, 1989	Succeeded by Leo Edwards – Mississippi June 21, 1989
