= Reno U-Haul murders =

1994 double murder in Reno, Nevada

- Date: January 3, 1994; 32 years ago
- Location: Reno, Nevada, United States
- Outcome: Huynh committed suicide while on death row in December 1995; Calambro executed by lethal injection on April 5, 1999
- Deaths: Keith Christopher (21); Peggy Crawford (38)
- Convicted: Alvaro C. Calambro (20); Duc Cong Huynh (38)
- Verdict: Guilty
- Convictions: First-degree murder (two counts)
- Sentence: Death

On January 3, 1994, two men, Duc Cong Huynh (Vietnamese: Huỳnh Đức Công; 1955 – December 26, 1995) and Alvaro C. Calambro (May 10, 1973 – April 5, 1999), committed a robbery at a U-Haul store in Reno, Nevada. During the robbery, Calambro and Huynh, the latter who used to work at the store, rounded up two of Huynh's former co-workers, Peggy Crawford and Keith Christopher, and killed them by bludgeoning them with a hammer and tire iron. After the double murder, the pair fled to California, and they were later arrested in Los Angeles.

Both men were extradited back to Nevada and charged with murder, and they were sentenced to death after pleading guilty in separate courts. However, Huynh committed suicide while on death row before he could be executed, while Calambro, who volunteered and waived his right to appeal, was executed by lethal injection on April 5, 1999, in spite of the plea from his family and the Philippines Government for mercy.

== Double murder ==
On January 3, 1994, two men entered a U-Haul store in Reno, Nevada, where they committed a robbery that led to the death of two employees.

On that day, at about 7pm, the two victims, 21-year-old Keith Christopher and 28-year-old Peggy Crawford, were the last to remain at the store as they volunteered to close the U-Haul center at the end of work. While they were checking the pumps and locking the doors, the duo were attacked and held at gunpoint by two robbers, 20-year-old Alvaro Calambro and 38-year-old Duc Cong Huynh, the latter who previously worked at the store before he was fired several weeks before the murders. Huynh and Calambro, who was the brother of Huynh's wife, plotted the robbery since he knew that there would be money inside the premises.

After attacking the duo, Calambro and Huynh ordered the two victims to get on the ground behind the counter, and Huynh ordered Christopher to retrieve money from the store's back office safe. Calambro gagged both victims with tape and used the company twine to tie up both the victims side by side, before he first attacked Christopher by smashing his head with a hammer multiple times, and while he was bludgeoned, Christopher put up a struggle and was also injured in the wrists, hands, and legs. Calambro also went as far as to use a tire iron to stab Christopher's skull and separate it by nearly half. Afterwards, Crawford was killed by Calambro, who similarly inflicted multiple blows on her head, and stabbed her head with a crowbar. Autopsy results showed that both Crawford and Christopher died as a result of fatal head wounds caused by the beating.

After the double murder, the pair escaped the crime scene with $2,400 stolen from the store. In the following two weeks, the pair would commit more crimes in both Nevada and California, including the robbery of a Reno gun store, carjacking a newspaper delivery man and the robbery of a bank in San Jose, California. Two weeks later, the men became the subject of a high-speed pursuit by police in downtown Los Angeles, and the chase ended at the Los Angeles Hall of Records, where both Huynh and Calambro held a security officer hostage and engaged in a nine-hour standoff with the police before they surrendered. After their arrests, the men confessed to their involvement in the U-Haul murders.

== Perpetrators ==
Alvaro Calambro was born in the Philippines on May 10, 1973. Calambro and his family immigrated to the United States in 1983 when he was ten, and settled in Delano, California. While he was not a naturalized U.S. citizen, Calambro lived in the U.S. for 11 years up until his arrest for murder. According to sources, Calambro had a troubled childhood given that his parents neglected him and his seven siblings, and his father, who was reportedly mentally ill, was physically abusive towards his mother and also sexually assaulted one of Calambro's sisters. Calambro dropped out of school at sixth grade and worked in various jobs (including a hotel-casino in Reno, Nevada), and in 1993, Calambro joined a Filipino gang known as S.I.G. in Delano. Calamrbo had a history of truancy and arrests for minor offences.

Duc Cong Huynh, a Vietnamese immigrant and native of Saigon (present-day Ho Chi Minh City), lived in the United States for a number of years, during which he, at one point, became married to one of Alvaro Calambro's sisters, Maria Calambro, and therefore became Calambro's brother-in-law. Together, the couple had a son, Binh Canto Calambro. However, Binh died at the age of four shortly after Huynh's arrest for the U-Haul murders, becoming the victim of a murder-suicide pact entered by his parents. After Huynh disclosed the plan during a suicide attempt in custody at the Los Angeles Jail, authorities intervened at the family's Nevada residence. Maria survived the incident, but Binh died after his mother fed him a lot of sleeping pills and slit his wrists with a steak knife. As a result of their son's murder, Maria was charged, convicted and sentenced to life imprisonment, and she lost her appeal in 1998. Maria, who served her sentence at the Southern Nevada Women's Correctional Facility, was paroled and released in 2021.

== Charges ==
On January 27, 1994, a Washoe County grand jury formally indicted both Huynh and Calambro for the murders of Christopher and Crawford.

Aside from the Nevada murder charges, both Calambro and Huynh were also charged in California with various kidnapping and firearm offences, and they were sentenced to multiple life sentences after pleading guilty to at least 28 felony counts.

In addition to the murders at the U-Haul in Reno, Huynh was also charged with the murder of his son Binh, who died due to the murder-suicide pact he earlier hatched together with Maria during his detention at Los Angeles. He was set to be separately tried for these three homicides. Maria was also charged with helping her husband and brother to evade arrest from the authorities, and therefore sentenced to the maximum term of five years' imprisonment, which would run consecutively with her life sentences for her son's murder.

On June 3, 1994, Supervising Deputy District Attorney David Stanton announced that the Nevada prosecution would seek the death penalty against the pair.

In September 1994, nine months after their arrests, both Calambro and Huynh were extradited back to Nevada, and formally arraigned in court for the charges of murder in the U-Haul case.

== Trials of Alvaro Calambro ==
=== Guilty plea and first death sentence ===
In December 1994, Alvaro Calambro first pleaded guilty to the murder of one of the victims, Peggy Crawford, but he claimed that he was innocent in the other murder of Keith Christopher, and a three-judge panel was set to decide on Calambro's sentence. On March 4, 1995, Calambro pleaded guilty to murdering both victims.

Calambro's sentencing trial took place on March 17, 1995, nearly two weeks after his guilty plea and conviction, and during the hearing, several detectives and a pathologist testified about the graphic details of the U-Haul murders. On March 18, 1995, the three-judge court sentenced Calambro to death for the murder of one of the victims, Peggy Crawford.

=== First two execution attempts ===
After his sentencing, Calambro expressed that he did not wish to appeal the death sentence and hoped to be executed as soon as possible. On April 19, 1995, Washoe District Judge Mills Lane signed Calambro's death warrant, scheduling Calambro to be put to death on May 22, 1995.

In late April 1995, the Nevada Supreme Court issued an order to the trial court to appoint a lawyer to represent Calambro in a mandatory appeal against his death sentence. Reportedly, despite carrying out the court order, Judge Lane criticized the higher court's order and stated that it was an unnecessary chanelling of court resources to allow Calambro to file an appeal since Calambro did not wish to appeal and also wished to be executed.

On July 28, 1995, the Nevada Supreme Court affirmed Calambro's death sentence and rejected the appeal, paving way for Calambro to be executed on a later date.

On August 22, 1995, Judge Mills Lane signed a second death warrant for Calambro, ordering that he be executed on September 11, 1995.

On September 7, 1995, Calambro's family members filed appeals, seeking to halt his execution. The defence argued that Calambro had low IQ and suffered from schizophrenic disorders, and that his mental competency was improperly evaluated to determine if he should be liable for both trial and capital punishment.

On September 9, 1995, Calambro was granted a stay of execution, after he stated he changed his mind and would proceed with the appeal.

=== Second death sentence ===
On September 12, 1995, shortly after Calambro's execution was stayed, Chief Deputy District Attorney David Stanton announced that he would seek a second death sentence for the murder of the other victim, Keith Christopher. The sentencing for this case was originally not carried out on account of Calambro's earlier promise to not appeal against his first death sentence for Peggy Crawford's murder before he changed his mind.

On September 20, 1995, the Nevada Supreme Court was set to appoint a three-judge panel to determine whether to sentence Calambro to the death penalty a second time for Christopher's murder.

In July 1996, Calambro's second sentencing trial began before another three-judge panel, and during the proceedings, two psychologists testified that Calambro had a history of schizophrenia and low IQ, which were factors the defence raised in their arguments against a second death sentence for Calambro. It was reported that in midst of the process, Christopher's mother wanted Calambro to be executed for the murder of her son.

On July 12, 1996, Calambro was sentenced to death a second time by the three-judge court.

== Duc Cong Huynh's trial and suicide ==
On March 23, 1995, Duc Cong Huynh pleaded guilty to both the murders of Keith Christopher and Peggy Crawford, and like Calambro, he faced the death penalty for his involvement in the double murder, and a three-judge panel was set to sentence him on both murders.

In June 1995, a three-judge panel sentenced Huynh to death for the U-Haul double murder. A month later, Washoe District Judge Mills Lane signed a death warrant for Huynh, scheduling him to be executed on September 11, 1995. Huynh's execution date coincided with the scheduled date of Calambro's execution and they were set to be executed an hour apart of each other, although it was possible that Huynh's execution might happen a month later than Calambro, given that his appeal would likely take at least a month in order to be resolved. Similar to Calambro, Huynh expressed that he wished to be executed for his crimes and to not appeal against his death sentence.

On September 4, 1995, the Nevada Supreme Court issued a stay of execution for Huynh, and it ruled that it was mandatory for Huynh's case to be reviewed and that his mental competency should be evaluated to ensure if he was fit to give up his appeals and be executed. Later that month, Huynh affirmed that he wanted to die for his crimes.

On December 26, 1995, 40-year-old Duc Cong Huynh was found dead and hanging in his one-man cell at Ely State Prison, where he was held on death row alongside Calambro. According to prison officials, Huynh's death was assumed to be suicide and this was his third suicide attempt.

== Execution of Calambro ==
=== Appeal and death warrants ===
On April 17, 1997, Alvaro Calambro's lawyers filed an appeal to the Nevada Supreme Court, seeking to overturn the death sentence on the grounds that three of the four aggravating factors required for the judges to impose a death sentence were not fulfilled in this case. On January 22, 1998, Calambro's appeal was denied by the Nevada Supreme Court.

On May 13, 1998, a death warrant was signed for one of the murders, scheduling Calambro to be executed on June 8, 1998, by lethal injection. On May 20, 1998, Calambro received the same execution date of June 8, 1998, in a second court hearing before a different judge for the second murder. Later, due to legal reasons, the execution date of Calambro was rescheduled for June 13, 1998.

On June 5, 1998, a week before Calambro's scheduled execution, his mother filed an appeal seeking to stop the execution of her son, and she and her lawyer stated that her son suffered from both borderline intellectual disability and schizophrenia and therefore should not be executed.

On June 10, 1998, a Washoe District Court judge rejected the appeal from Calambro's mother, but the case was further appealed to the Nevada Supreme Court. Ultimately, about 28 hours before he was scheduled to be executed, Calambro received a stay of execution from the Nevada Supreme Court.

On June 23, 1998, Washoe District Judge Steven Elliott ruled that Calambro was mentally competent to be put to death, although the defence expressed that they would appeal to the Nevada Supreme Court. While Calambro's mother's appeal was pending before the Nevada Supreme Court, the Nevada prosecutors sought to reschedule Calambro's death sentence for July 1998, but Judge Elliott ordered a delay in signing the death warrant, citing there was potential procedure delays and proceedings regarding the defendant's mental competency.

On July 3, 1998, a new death warrant was signed for Calambro, and his execution was rescheduled to begin on July 27, 1998. Merely three days after the death warrant was signed, U.S. District Judge Howard D. McKibben issued a stay of execution for Calambro, whose mental competency hearing was reset for later the same month. The hearing proceeded as scheduled on July 17, 1998, and during the proceedings, several psychiatric experts testified that Calambro was mentally fit to face the death sentence and waive his right to appeal against the sentence.

On September 26, 1998, the Nevada Supreme Court dismissed the follow-up appeal of Calambro's mother, and upheld the lower court's finding that Calambro was mentally competent to be put to death and give up his appeal. Finally, Calambro's mother appealed to the U.S. Supreme Court against this decision, and in February 1999, the U.S. Supreme Court denied the appeal. The case was remitted back to the lower federal courts, and a hearing was scheduled on March 9, 1999, for District Judge McKibben to rule on Calambro's mental competency.

On March 13, 1999, District Judge McKibben decided that Calambro was mentally competent to forgo his appeals and face execution.

=== Final days and execution ===
On March 17, 1999, four days after he was found mentally competent for execution, a new death warrant was signed for Calambro, and his death sentence was set to be carried out on April 5, 1999.

On March 27, 1999, the 9th Circuit Court of Appeals dismissed Calambro's mother's petition to reopen her appeal regarding her son's mental competency for capital punishment. On March 20, 1999, as a final recourse to stop her son's execution, Calambro's mother appealed to the U.S. Supreme Court, but the appeal was denied in the end.

During the final weeks before his execution, local Catholic bishops and officials from the Philippines appealed to the Nevada governor to commute Calambro's death sentence to life imprisonment. Furthermore, the Filipino officials argued that the Vienna Convention treaty had been violated, given the fact that the Philippines were not immediately notified of the arrest of Calambro for the U-Haul murders back in 1994, resulting in Calambro not receiving adequate legal representation in his trial. Ultimately, Nevada Governor Kenny Guinn denied clemency for Calambro after reviewing his case, and allowed the execution to move forward.

Meanwhile, in midst of the efforts to spare his life, Calambro was transferred from Ely State Prison to Nevada State Prison, where the state's execution chamber was located. Calambro was held in an isolation cell at the prison for several weeks up until the eve of his execution, and was moved to another cell near to the execution chamber, and he was reported to spend his last day watching television, accepting communion and also conversed with one of his sisters. For his last meal, Calambro ordered a steak, rice, corn, applesauce and a Sprite.

On April 5, 1999, 25-year-old Alvaro Calambro was put to death by lethal injection at the Nevada State Prison. Before his death sentence was carried out, Calambro was allowed to say his last words, "I regret it." Two minutes after the drugs were administered, Calambro was pronounced dead at 9:06pm. Calambro was the eighth person executed in Nevada since the 1976 resumption of capital punishment, and the 50th inmate executed in the state since 1905. He was also the only Asian death row prisoner executed in Nevada since 1976 till today.

== See also ==
- List of homicides in Nevada
- Capital punishment in Nevada
- List of people executed in Nevada
- List of people executed in the United States in 1999
