= Ely State Prison =

Prison in Nevada, United States

Ely State Prison (ESP)
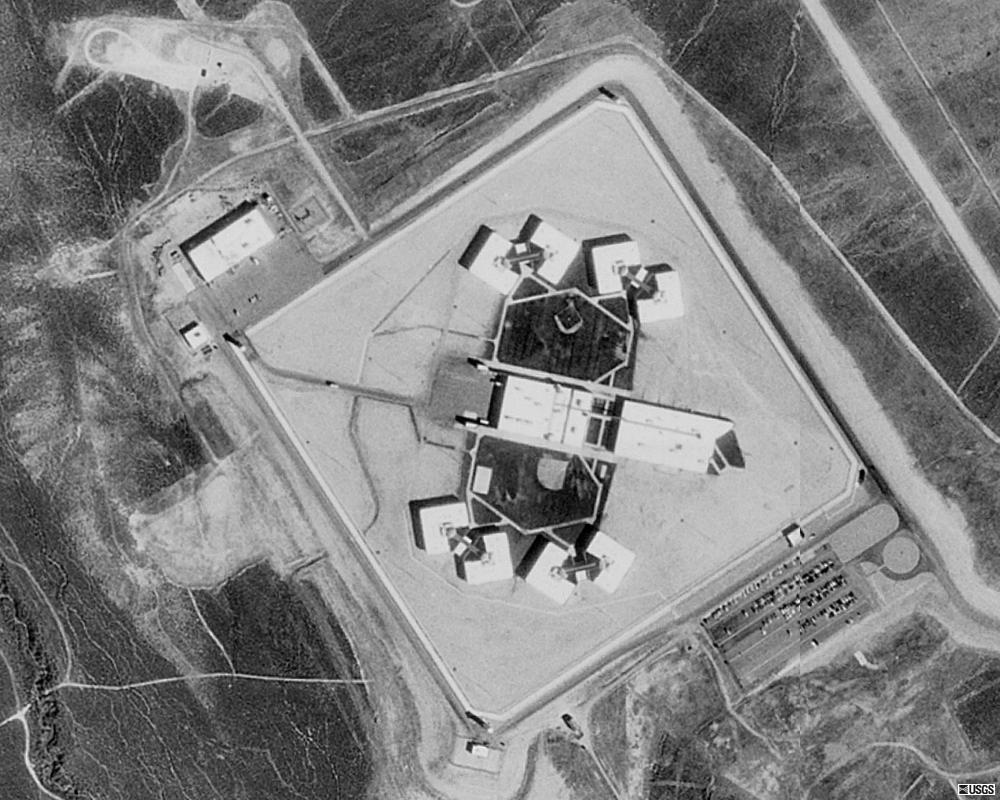
- 1999 aerial photo of the prison
- Interactive map of Ely State Prison (ESP)
- Location: 4569 North State Route 490 Ely, Nevada 89702; 39.3855°N 114.9384°W
- Status: Operational
- Security class: Medium-Maximum
- Capacity: 1,183
- Population: 1,125 male inmates (May 10, 2017)
- Opened: July 1989
- Managed by: Nevada Department of Corrections
- Warden: Terry Royal

Ely State Prison (ESP) is a medium security penitentiary located in unincorporated White Pine County, Nevada, about 9 miles (14 km) north of Ely. The facility, operated by the Nevada Department of Corrections, opened in July 1989. As of 2010, the prison has a staff of 406 and is a major employer in the Ely area. As of September 2010, the prison housed 1,077 male inmates.

== History ==
Residents of Ely, Nevada spent a year and $25,000 lobbying for the prison to be built in the area. On December 19, 1985, the prison was unanimously approved by the finance committees of the Nevada Legislature to be built in the Ely area. The prison opened in July 1989. Phase I was completed and opened in August of that year. Phase II was completed November 1990. Originally Ely had a capacity of 1,054; as of 2010 its capacity is for 1,150. The prison has a staff of 406 and is a major employer in the Ely area.

On July 30, 2024, a fight broke out at the prison between several inmates. The altercation killed three inmates and injured nine others, among the dead was a convicted murderer serving life without parole for killing an inmate. In September 2024, nearly 2000 inmates, including ones on death row, were transferred from Ely to High Desert State Prison and vice versa. This resulted in Ely's security level being changed from maximum to medium.

=== Allegations of inadequate medical care and ACLU lawsuit ===
Ely State Prison was the recipient of numerous criticisms by the American Civil Liberties Union (ACLU) regarding its alleged failure to provide adequate medical care to its inmates.

Dr. William Noel, a medical expert retained by the ACLU, produced a report in December 2007 that described his review of the medical records of 35 prisoners from ESP. He wrote that "the medical care provided at Ely State Prison amounts to the grossest possible medical malpractice, and the most shocking and callous disregard for human life and human suffering, that I have ever encountered in the medical profession in my thirty-five years of practice."

His report describes in detail the death of Patrick Cavanaugh, an inmate who he claims died due to complications of diabetes, after having received no insulin for a period of three years and having his ulcerated legs left to fester without treatment or amputation. The report also mentions accounts of wholly untreated cases of chronic pain, hepatitis, fibromyalgia, rheumatoid arthritis and syphilis. The report also notes cases in which an epileptic patient was not regularly equipped with a helmet; in which a stroke sufferer was not given any physical therapy nor even an arm brace to prevent the eventual contraction of his affected limb; and in which a patient was switched back to a potentially lethal medication.

On January 23, 2008, the ACLU met with the Nevada State Board of Prison Commissioners seeking a consent decree which would voluntarily have let a federal court oversee prison medical care. Nevada Governor Jim Gibbons and other commissioners were presented with a report by NDOC Director Howard Skolnik and Medical Director Dr. Robert Bannister refuting Noel's findings. The commissioners rejected the ACLU's request.

On March 6, 2009, the ACLU filed a lawsuit against the Nevada Department of Corrections, Governor Gibbons and other state officials. In it, they sought to have a federal judge find that the Department of Corrections had not provided inmates with adequate medical care. The suit was settled in July 2010, with the NDOC agreeing to appoint an independent medical expert to monitor the prison's health care system and to submit regular reports evaluating officials' compliance with various medical requirements. It was also agreed that nurses would make daily rounds at the prison to pick up medical request forms and that inmates would have access to a registered nurse or higher level practitioner within 48 hours of requesting medical attention.

== Men's death row and execution chamber ==
The men's death row was located at Ely until 2024. As of 2023 there are 57 prisoners on that death row.

The state execution chamber at Ely was built in 2016. The Nevada Legislature agreed to spend almost $860,000 to build it. A Las Vegas company, Kittrell Garlock & Associates, designed the chamber. The execution chamber was previously the prison courtroom, and it also functions as a private meeting place for attorneys. At that time no executions were scheduled due to a lack of execution drugs available. Previously executions by the state of Nevada were to be carried out at Nevada State Prison, even though the facility closed due to budget issues in 2012. In 2012 the department was considering a capital improvement program that would relocate the execution chamber from Nevada State Prison to Ely State Prison, which was later done in 2016.

== Notable inmates ==
Inmate Name	Register Number	Status	Details
War Machine	1131480	Life sentence. Eligible for parole after 36 years.	Convicted of multiple criminal charges related to an assault on his ex-girlfriend, porn star Christy Mack.
Darren Mack	1014861	Eligible for parole in 2042	Murder - Millionaire who killed his wife and shot at a judge over a dispute over custody of his child.
Coyote Acabo	55671	Released in November 2013	Battery with a deadly weapon, writer and prison activist who spent his last five years on High Risk Potential status
David Casper	65117	Transferred to Arizona	Armed robbery - Adopted son of world-famous golfer Billy Casper. NDOC considers him to be High Risk Potential due to multiple attempts to escape from Ely State Prison.
Ike Ibeabuchi	71979	Released by Nevada, February 2014; released from custody, November 2015	Battery with intent to commit a crime and attempted sexual assault - A former regional heavyweight boxing champion.
Jose Vigoa	73847	Serving four life sentences without parole.	Armed robbery, murder - Vigoa was the leader of a band of robbers who robbed multiple casinos and armored cars in the Las Vegas area from 1998 to 2000, killing two guards during the crime spree. He pleaded guilty to avoid the death penalty, and was sentenced to life without parole. The case was later featured in an episode of The FBI Files.
Chester Stiles	1036868	Serving 21 life sentences with the possibility of parole in 140 years.	Gained notoriety after he appeared in video clips of himself raping and sexually abusing a girl who was three years old at the time.
Scott Dozier		Committed suicide in January 2019.	Imprisoned for two murders, taking place in 2001 and 2002.
Duc Cong Huynh	46141	Committed suicide in December 1995.	Incarcerated on death row for the 1994 Reno U-Haul murders.

== See also ==
- Capital punishment in Nevada
- List of Nevada state prisons
