= Southern Nevada Correctional Center =

Prison in Nevada, United States

Coordinates: 35°46′28″N 115°18′46″W

- Southern Nevada Correctional Center (left) closed in 2008 and adjacent Jean Conservation Camp (right) closed in 2026.
- Interactive map of Southern Nevada Correctional Center
- Location: 1 Prison Road Jean, Nevada
- Status: Closed
- Opened: 1978
- Closed: 2008
- Managed by: Nevada Department of Corrections

Southern Nevada Correctional Center is a medium-security prison in Jean, an unincorporated area of Clark County in the U.S. state of Nevada. About 30 miles south of Las Vegas, the facility has not had any inmates since July 2008. It is maintained by Nevada Department of Corrections in "mothball status" by a crew of one.

SNCC should not be confused with the Southern Desert Correctional Center, also run by the state for state inmates, and the Nevada Southern Detention Center, a for-profit prison in Pahrump, Nevada that is operated by CoreCivic, formerly known as the Corrections Corporation of America.

== History ==
The original 1978 facility housed prisoners sentenced for DUI or similar crimes. Later a psychiatric center was established in Desert Hall, which housed a medium security psychological treatment facility for inmates deemed to be too impaired to live among the general population. In the 1980s the prison contained mostly sex offenders, offenders who had been on protective custody in other prisons in the state and "lifers" who had been in custody for many years with no problems.

The facility closed in 2000, then re-opened for two years to house inmates under 25 years of age.

In 2006 the center installed the first in the nation electronic tracking system for all prisoners.

As late as 2015, Nevada legislators raised the possibility of reopening it.

== Description ==
The cell blocks are situated alongside the left, right, and rear sides of a central campus and, from the outside, resemble condominiums or apartments constructed in free-standing modules. Each housing unit consists of two "wings". Each wing has a central rotunda with two tiers of cells. The cells are fitted for two people with a bunk bed, sink and toilet. Cells are not barred. Each cell has a door with a small window in it.

== In Popular Culture ==
The prison appears in the 2010 video game Fallout: New Vegas as a former correctional facility of the New California Republic, containing a gang of escaped convicts known as Powder Gangers.
