= Daryl Mack =

American murderer (1958–2006)

- Born: Daryl Linnie Mack; August 28, 1958; Reno, Nevada, U.S.
- Died: April 26, 2006 (aged 47); Nevada State Prison, Nevada, U.S.
- Status: Executed by lethal injection
- Convictions: First degree murder (2 counts); Battery causing substantial bodily harm Burglary (2 counts); Possession of stolen property (3 counts); Conspiracy to commit larceny
- Penalty: Life imprisonment without parole (October, 1994); Death (May 15, 2002)

Details
- Victims: 2
- Date: October 1988; April 1994

Daryl Linnie Mack (August 28, 1958 – April 26, 2006) was an American man who was executed in Nevada for murder. Mack was sentenced to death for the October 1988 rape and murder of Betty Jane May in Reno. The murder went unsolved for twelve years until DNA evidence linked him to the crime. He was already in jail at the time, having been sentenced to life in prison without parole for the April 1994 murder of Kim Parks. He was sentenced to death, waived his appeals and asked to be put to death. Mack was executed via lethal injection at Nevada State Prison on April 26, 2006. He remains the most recent person executed in Nevada.

== Background ==
Mack had a lengthy criminal history. He had prior convictions for battery causing substantial bodily harm, burglary, and two counts of possession of stolen property in 1980, burglary and possession of stolen property in 1983, and conspiracy to commit larceny in 1991. He also had multiple disciplinary violations in prison since his incarceration in 1994.

== Murders ==
On October 28, 1988, the body of 55-year-old Betty Jane May was found in her basement room at a boarding house in Reno, Nevada. Her neighbor, Steven Floyd, found the body. An autopsy was carried out the next morning. Medical experts concluded that she had been raped and then strangled to death. The murder would go unsolved for twelve years.

On April 8, 1994, the body of 35-year-old Kim Parks was found in a motel room in Reno by a maid. She had been strangled to death with her own bra. According to police, Parks worked as a prostitute and was a regular guest at the motel. She had registered into the motel late at night on April 6. The autopsy determined she had been killed on April 7. Blood discovered on a bedsheet in the room was not hers. An employee of the motel reported to police that they had seen Parks with Mack at the motel. Through a seizure order, police took a sample of Mack's blood, which matched the blood from the crime scene. Mack was arrested and charged with murder.

== Trial and revelation ==
Mack denied killing Parks. He claimed he had fought with her over money she had supposedly stolen from him. He originally denied ever being at the motel, but the DNA evidence obtained from the bed sheet matched his. In October 1994, he was found guilty of the murder of Parks and was sentenced to life in prison without parole.

While Mack was in prison, the unsolved homicide of Betty Jane May was reexamined by another detective who requested DNA testing of some of the evidence. Semen that had been taken from May's body as well as blood stains found on her blouse matched the DNA profile of Mack. In 2000, Mack was officially charged with first-degree murder. This time the state of Nevada sought the death penalty. Before his trial began, Mack requested to waive a jury trial and have a judge trial instead. Mack was tried by a three-judge panel and was sentenced to death on May 15, 2002. He continued to deny murdering May.

== Execution ==
Not long after his death sentence, Mack voluntarily gave up all his appeals. He refused to give any interviews to the media while awaiting execution and had said in court statements that he would rather be executed than spend the rest of his life in prison. His execution was originally scheduled to be carried out on March 5, 2004, but it was put on hold until the court resolved his legal appeals. It was then scheduled to be carried out on December 1, 2005, but was stayed by the Supreme Court of Nevada. The stay was lifted in February 2006, and Mack was rescheduled for execution on April 26, 2006.

On April 26, 2006, Mack was executed via lethal injection at Nevada State Prison. While in prison he converted to Islam and spent his final hours reading the Quran. His last meal was a fish fillet sandwich, french fries and a soft drink.

The prosecutor on the case was Dan Greco, Chief Deputy District Attorney, Major Violators Unit, Washoe County District Attorney's Office. After being strapped to the table in the execution chamber, Mack lifted his head up, looked at the witnesses in the viewing area until he spotted Greco, and then flashed what veterans CBS reporter Bill Brown described as "a maniacal grin" toward Greco. The grin startled a number of other witnesses who stepped backwards. Mack was pronounced dead at 9:06 p.m. and his final words were "Allah is great, Allah is great."

== Aftermath ==
Mack is the first and only African-American man to be executed by the state of Nevada since capital punishment was reinstated in 1976. He is also the first and only inmate to be executed in Nevada based solely on DNA evidence. Due to budgetary reasons, Nevada State Prison closed in 2012, officially making Mack the last person to be executed at Nevada State Prison.

As of 2026, Mack remains the most recent person to be executed by the state of Nevada, which has gone over twenty years without an execution. On April 24, 2026, two days prior to the twentieth anniversary of Mack's execution, the Las Vegas Review-Journal interviewed Betty May's two children. Betty's son, Charles May, said he believed justice was served with Mack's execution, but also stated, "Closure's just a term. In reality, I don't think we ever get real closure because we've lost someone we love."

Several executions in Nevada have nearly occurred since Mack's. Convicted murderer Scott Dozier was nearly executed by the state in 2018, but his execution was halted. Dozier later died by suicide by hanging in January 2019. In 2021, convicted mass murderer Zane Floyd was scheduled for execution in Nevada on July 26, 2021. However, a federal judge stayed the execution. If executed, Floyd would have been the first person executed in Nevada in over fifteen years.

In April 2026, Clark County District Attorney Steve Wolfson filed motions to schedule execution dates for Floyd, Donald William Sherman and Sterling Atkins, hinting at the possibility of resuming executions 20 years after Mack was put to death.

== See also ==
- List of most recent executions by jurisdiction
- List of people executed in Nevada
- List of people executed in the United States in 2006
