= John Gregovich =

Montenegrin American merchant and Nevada Senator in the late 19th century

Member of the Nevada Senate from the 19th district
- In office November 1894 – November 1898

Personal details
- Born: February 3, 1847 Kaštel Lastva, Montenegro
- Died: May 14, 1912 (aged 65) Tonopah, Nevada, U.S.
- Party: Silver Party

John Gregovich (February 3, 1847 – May 14, 1912) was a Montenegrin-American merchant and Nevada Senator in the late 19th century. A member of the Silver Party during his tenure as senator, Gregovich later helped take on the cases of various Montenegrin immigrants living in Tonopah after a mine fire in 1911.

== Biography ==
Gregovich was born in Kaštel Lastva, near Budva, and settled in Nevada in 1872. After working the gold mines in Tybo, for some years, he began his mercantile business in Eureka. He was twice elected County Commissioner of Eureka County, which was followed by a term as County Treasurer. In 1894, Gregovich was elected to the Nevada Senate and served in the 17th and 18th sessions of the legislature.

Gregovich was stabbed to death on May 14, 1912, by fellow immigrant Andriza Mircovich, who remains the only person executed by firing squad in the state of Nevada.

His house in Tonopah, the John Gregovich House, is a historic home listed on the National Register of Historic Places.

== See also ==
- List of homicides in Nevada
