= Andriza Mircovich =

Only prisoner ever executed by shooting in Nevada

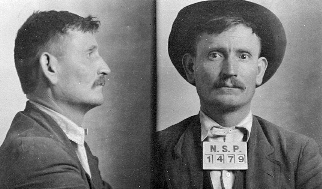
- Nevada State Prison mug shot
- Born: c. 1879; Austria-Hungary
- Died: May 14, 1913 (aged 33–34); Nevada State Prison, Carson City, Nevada, U.S.
- Cause of death: Execution by shooting
- Other names: Andrew, Andrigi, Andrija, or Andriji Mirkovich
- Occupation: Miner
- Status: Executed
- Conviction: First degree murder (1912)
- Penalty: Death by firing squad

Andriza (or Andrew) Mircovich (Serbian: Андрија Мирковић, romanized: Andrija Mirković, c. 1879 – May 14, 1913) was an Austro-Hungarian national of Serb descent. He was the only prisoner ever to be executed by shooting in the US state of Nevada. He had been sentenced to death for the premeditated murder of John Gregovich in Tonopah, Nevada. Mircovich felt that he was owed more money from Gregovich's administration of his late cousin's estate and resorted to settling the matter by stabbing Gregovich to death.

A 1911 statute was passed by the Nevada Legislature that allowed a death row inmate to opt to die by shooting or hanging; that statute was repealed in 1921. Mircovich was insistent on shooting, claiming that hanging often took too long. After the Nevada State Prison warden, George W. Cowing, was unable to find five men to form a firing squad, a shooting machine was requisitioned and built to carry out the execution.

== Background ==
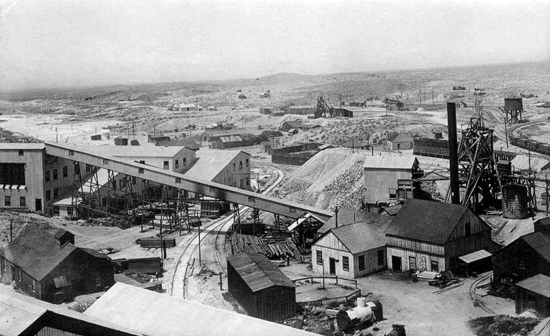
Mircovich's cousin died in the Tonopah Belmont Mine in February 1911.

Andriza Mircovich was a 31-year-old miner and a recent immigrant to the US from Austria-Hungary. Mircovich spoke little English and was barely literate in his native Serbian dialect. His cousin Christopher Mircovich had died in a fire in the Tonopah Belmont Mine on February 23, 1911. Because Christopher did not have a will, his estate was turned over to Nye County public administrator Arthur H. Keenan. At the recommendation of District Attorney James A. Sanders, Andriza Mircovich and Christopher Mircovich's surviving siblings, Vasso and Maria, met with John Gregovich on May 10, 1911. Gregovich, who also went by the surname Greggory, was a fellow Serb from Castellastva, (now Petrovac), who was handling the cases of other Serbian miners who had died in the fire. Mircovich, who was unfamiliar with the probate laws in Nevada, began cursing Gregovich and Sanders because he was frustrated over being unable to take sole control of the estate.

At the time of his death, Christopher Mircovich's estate included $520 in cash, and a settlement of $2,000 from the Tonopah Belmont Company. On July 17, 1911, Gregovich issued a check for $50 to Andriza Mircovich, followed by another check for $1,742.50 to Vasso and Maria on July 22. $507.32 was added to the estate for money orders held in Christopher's name. After legal and administrative fees were paid, $966.25 in undisbursed funds remained in the estate. Mircovich believed that he was owed more money and his demands escalated into threats against Gregovich. On November 14, 1911, Gregovich petitioned District Judge Peter J. Sommers, to be released as executor of the estate. Feeling cheated, Mircovich vowed to take matters into his own hands. At that time, South Slavic immigrants traditionally settled disagreements in mining camps by the use of a knife.

== Death of John Gregovich ==
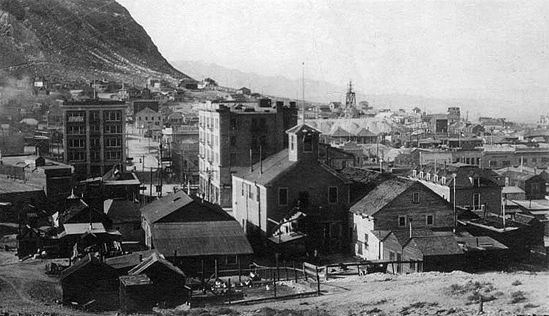
Tonopah, Nevada, where Mircovich killed John Gregovich in May 1912.

In the early morning of May 14, 1912, Gregovich was at the Tonopah and Goldfield train depot to collect a grocery bill and had a man called J. R. Masterson in conversation. Mircovich had come to the depot from the cemetery to see who was arriving on the morning train. When he saw Gregovich on the station platform, Mircovich said, "I will get you, you old son-of-a-bitch!" He then stabbed Gregovich with a knife in the chest and groin, puncturing his lung and severing his femoral artery. Masterson was able to clamp the artery with a hemostat from his medical bag. Deputy Sheriff William Walker immediately apprehended Mircovich, who told him that the murder weapon was his and that Gregovich had taken his money. Despite the efforts of doctors, Gregovich died of shock at 1:00 p.m. at Miner's Hospital. At the Nye County Jail, Mircovich told Sheriff Ed Malley that he "wanted to make John Gregovich die", although Malley did not advise him that such statements could be used against him in court.

=== Trial and sentencing ===
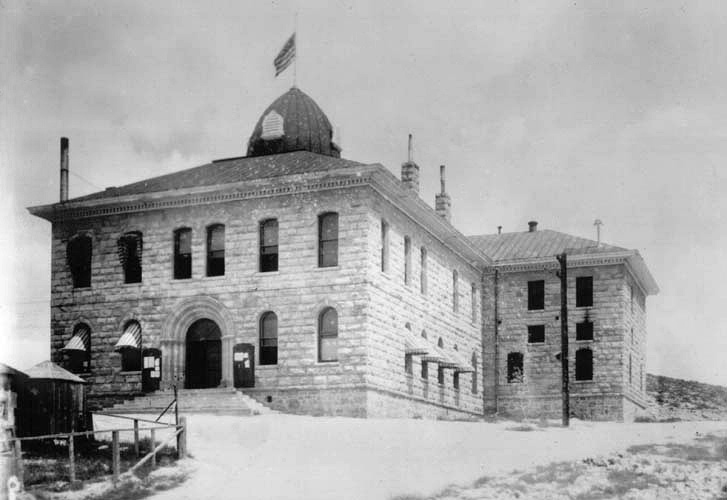
Mircovich was convicted at the Nye County Courthouse on June 15, 1912.

At the grand jury hearing on the next day, Nye County Judge Mark R. Averill denied bail, as Mircovich's case involved capital murder. George B. Thatcher was Mircovich's court-appointed attorney, but had to leave town on June 1, 1912, for the Democratic State Convention in Fallon. Averill then appointed Patrick M. Bowler on behalf of Mircovich until Thatcher returned on June 5. The case was prosecuted by District Attorney Sanders. Witnesses testified that Mircovich had made threats against Gregovich's life, and was once thrown out of Gregovich's business premises. In his closing statement Sanders challenged the all-male jury to have the "manhood" to "defend the law of my country and its liberty-loving people" or else "we might just as well dynamite this old courthouse. We might just as well take his Honor off the bench and say we have no law in Nye County."

On June 15, 1912, Mircovich was convicted of premeditated murder. He was sentenced to death by Judge Averill. Mircovich boarded a train to Nevada State Prison in Carson City on June 17 while escorted by Sheriff Malley and prison warden George W. Cowing. Mircovich parted with the statement: "They will treat me to a shower of cold lead." He became nauseated during the trip and begged his captors to shoot him right away, not understanding that attorneys would pursue appeals on his behalf.

Attorney J.E. McNamara argued to the Nevada Supreme Court that Sanders unfairly prejudiced the jury with the statement: "Why, gentlemen of the jury, if you cannot pronounce by your verdict the death penalty upon this defendant, I say, let's resurrect old Casey [that killed Mrs. Hislop in Goldfield] and let him live again." However, the appeal was denied and the lower court decision was upheld, with Justice Pat McCarran abstaining from the opinion.

== Execution ==
Nevada State Prison had been the state-designated facility for hangings since 1903. At the urging of the Mormon population, the Nevada Legislature passed a statute in 1910 that became effective in January 1911, which allowed condemned prisoners to choose between execution by shooting or hanging. Only Mircovich and one other inmate selected shooting. However, the other prisoner's sentence was commuted. Warden Cowing tried to talk Mircovich out of his decision. Mircovich did not want to be hanged and insisted on being shot, claiming it would be quicker. Cowing was faced with a predicament in meeting the scheduled execution date of August 29, 1912, because he was unable to find five marksmen willing to participate in a firing squad.

=== The shooting machine ===
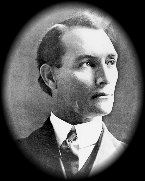
Denver S. Dickerson supervised the execution.

The state then ordered a rack of rifles that was to be set up on a frame by an Eastern ordnance foundry. The 1000-pound (450 kg) execution machine, which was called the "shooting gallery of steel", included three Savage Model 1899 .30-30 caliber rifles with Maxim silencers. When the device arrived at the prison, Cowing no longer wanted to have any part of the execution and resigned. Denver S. Dickerson, a former Nevada governor and prison reformer, was appointed as the new warden. On May 13, 1913, Prison Chaplain Lloyd B. Thomas of St. Peter's Episcopal Church, Carson City, Nevada, made an unsuccessful appeal for commutation on Mircovich's behalf with the Board of Pardons.

The "shooting machine" was designed to be loaded with two lethal rounds and a blank cartridge, each connected to a coiled spring mechanism. The device could be fired by cutting three strings, only one of which would fire the rifles. This design would prevent the three randomly selected prison guards from knowing who would be responsible for triggering the lethal shot. On the morning of May 14, the three guards entered the firing area and then the 12 invited witnesses were admitted to a designated enclosed space in the yard. Mircovich refused an offer for a blindfold from Warden Dickerson and shook his hand, stating: "I much obligated to you. You be good man to me." Mircovich was then strapped to a chair bolted onto a platform in front of the machine. The prison doctor, Donald T. McLean, placed a heart-shaped target on Mircovich's chest. The aim on the loaded rifles was sighted on the defendant's heart, and checked by each guard. Mircovich cursed the name of Judge Averill and said "I die like a soldier" before he was shot to death.

=== Aftermath ===
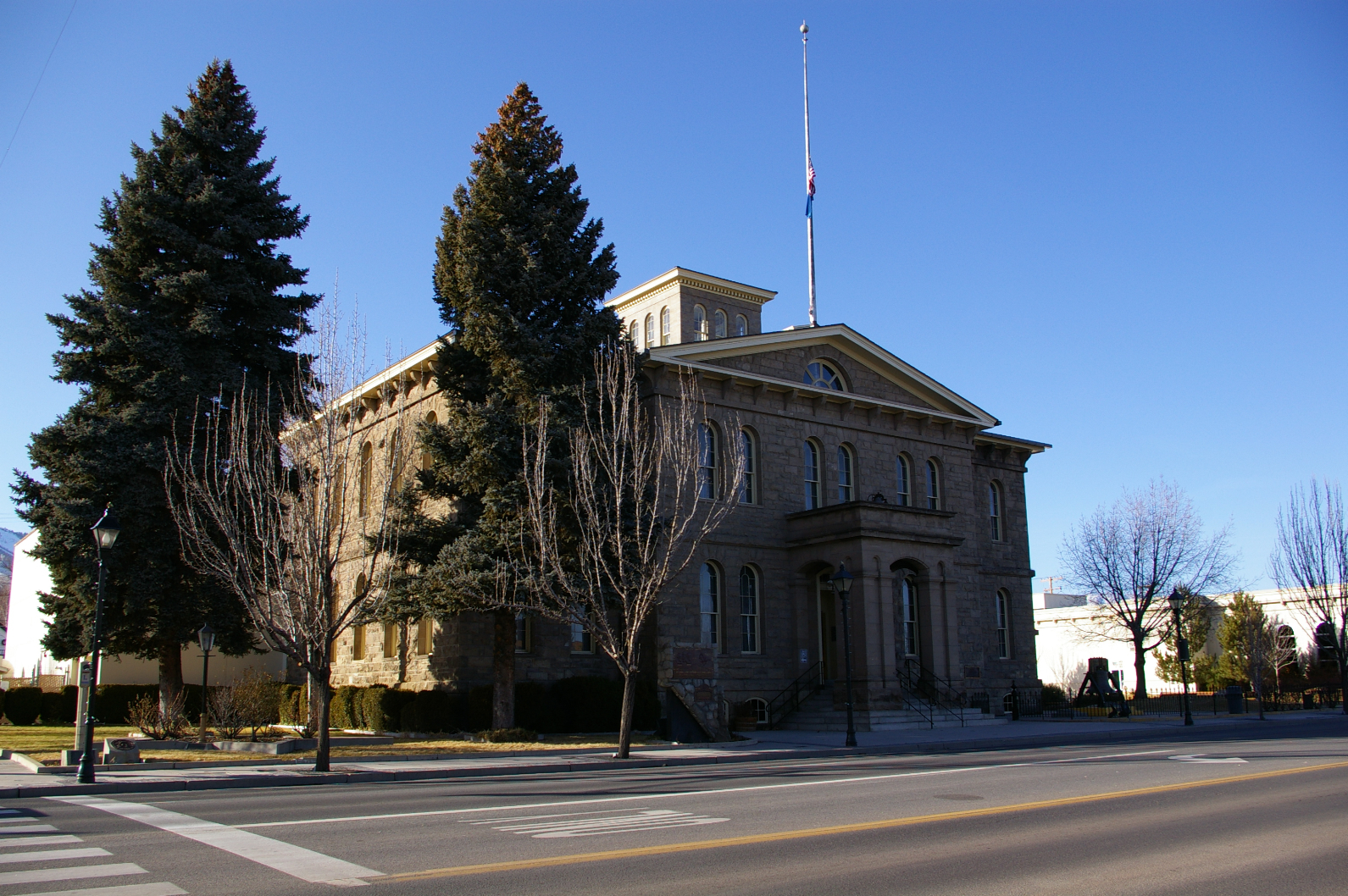
The rifles from the machine that shot Mircovich now reside at Nevada State Museum in Carson City.

Doctor McLean declared that the death was instantaneous. An autopsy found the two soft-nosed ball cartridges within 2/3 inch (17mm) of each other in Mircovich's heart. Reverend Thomas conducted an informal service at the prison cemetery that afternoon. Mircovich's body was buried in a pine coffin on the same day.

In a 1915 report to the Nevada Legislature, Dickerson stated that despite his personal reservations, "executions by shooting are a trifle less barbarous than by hanging and have the further merit of eliminating many of the possibilities of bungling." However, the shooting machine was never used again and was placed in storage by the prison quarry. In July 1942, it was donated with 50 tons of scrap metal for a collection drive during World War II. The rifles from the machine were found during an inventory of the prison armory in June 1977 and were donated to the Nevada State Museum in Carson City.

== See also ==
- Capital punishment in Nevada
- List of homicides in Nevada
- Capital punishment in the United States
- Gee Jon
- Miranda warning
