= Carroll Cole =

American serial killer (1938–1985)

- Cole in 1984
- Born: Carroll Edward Cole; May 9, 1938; Sioux City, Iowa, U.S.
- Died: December 6, 1985 (aged 47); Nevada State Prison, Carson City, Nevada, U.S.
- Cause of death: Execution by lethal injection
- Spouses: Billie Whitworth (m. 1963; div. 1965) Diana Faye Younglove Pashal (m. 1973; murdered 1979)
- Convictions: Nevada; First degree murder (2 counts); Texas; Murder (3 counts)
- Penalty: Nevada; Death (October 12, 1984); Texas; Life imprisonment without the possibility of parole

Details
- Victims: 5 convicted, claimed 16–35
- Span of crimes: 1947–1980
- Country: United States
- States: California, Nevada, Texas
- Date apprehended: November 30, 1980

Carroll Edward "Eddie" Cole (May 9, 1938 – December 6, 1985) was an American serial killer who was executed in Nevada in 1985 for killing two women by strangulation. He was also convicted of murdering three other women in Texas and is believed to have murdered dozens between 1947 and 1980.

== Early life ==
Cole was born May 9, 1938 in Sioux City, Iowa, the second son of LaVerne Cole (May 25, 1900 – February 5, 1975) and Vesta Cole (September 4, 1904 – January 27, 1984). His younger sister was born in 1939 and soon afterward, his family moved to California, where LaVerne found work in a shipyard. Not long after that, LaVerne went to fight in World War II. While his father was away, his mother had several affairs and sometimes took Cole along to her rendezvous, threatening to beat him if he told his father. Vesta was emotionally abusive to Cole and dressed him as a girl. At school, he was teased about his "girly name" by his peers.

=== First murder ===
At age 8, Cole killed one of his classmates, a boy of the same age named Duane Eugene Owen, by drowning him in a lake in Richmond, California. The death was regarded an accident by authorities until Cole confessed to it many years later in an autobiography he wrote in prison. During a press interview, Cole said of this event, "I was primed, I had made the mental commitment I was going to get even with my mother, and things just built up and built up and became an obsession."

As a teen, Cole committed several petty crimes and was frequently arrested for drunkenness and minor thefts. After high school, he joined the U.S. Army, but was given a bad-conduct discharge in 1958 for stealing pistols. In 1960, Cole attacked two couples parked in cars on a lover's lane. Soon afterward, he called the police in Richmond, California, where he was living, and told them that he was plagued by violent fantasies involving strangling women.

== Later life ==
Cole spent time in various mental hospitals over the next three years. At the last of them, Stockton State Hospital, a Dr. Weiss wrote: "He seems to be afraid of the female figure and cannot have intercourse with her first but must kill her before he can do it." Weiss approved his release in April 1963, despite hospital staff having diagnosed Cole with antisocial personality disorder.

Upon his release, Cole moved to Dallas, Texas, where his brother Richard was living. There, he met and married an alcoholic stripper named Billie Whitworth, but this did not change his perspective towards women. After two years, the marriage ended when Cole burned down a motel after convincing himself that Whitworth was having sex with men there. As a result, he was arrested for arson. Upon his release from prison, Cole attempted to strangle an 11-year-old girl in Missouri. He was arrested and sentenced to five years in prison.

After the sentence was up, Cole ended up in Nevada, where he attempted to strangle two more women. Once again, he checked himself into a mental hospital. The doctors there noted his murderous fantasies but still elected not to detain him and he was given a ticket back to San Diego.

=== Serial murders ===
Cole's first victim as an adult was Essie Louise Buck, whom he had picked up in a San Diego tavern on May 7, 1971. He strangled her to death in his car and drove around with her body in the trunk before eventually dumping it. Just two weeks later, he killed an unidentified woman and buried her in a wooded area. He later claimed that they had proven themselves unfaithful to their husbands, and so reminded him of his adulterous mother.

In July 1973, Cole married barmaid Diana Faye Younglove Pashal, who was also an alcoholic. They argued and fought frequently, and Cole regularly went off on his own for days at a time. He would commit murders while he was away, including one woman he allegedly cannibalized to a degree. In September 1979, Cole strangled Pashal to death. A suspicious neighbor called the police eight days later, but although they found Pashal's body wrapped in a blanket and stuffed in a closet, they decided that she had died because of her heavy drinking, and Cole was released without charge after questioning.

Cole left San Diego and started moving around again. In 1979, Cole met Marie Cushman at a bar in Las Vegas. That same evening, the two went to a motel where they had sex; he then killed her by strangulation.

Following the Las Vegas killing, he returned to Dallas, where he fatally strangled three more women in November 1980. Cole was a suspect in the second of these killings and was also found on the scene of the third murder. He was arrested and held in custody. The police then came to the conclusion that the victim had probably died of natural causes, and Cole was about to be ruled out as a suspect before he confessed to, along with this murder, all of the other killings. Cole claimed that he had murdered at least fourteen women over the previous nine years, although he added that there may have been more and he couldn't remember exactly, as he was usually drunk when he committed his crimes.

== Conviction and death ==
On April 9, 1981, Cole was convicted of three of the murders committed in Texas. He was sentenced to life at the Huntsville Prison. In 1984, Cole's mother died and his attitude was reported to have changed. He agreed to face further murder charges filed in Nevada, even though it could possibly mean the death penalty.

In February 1984, Cole was extradited to Nevada, where he was tried and convicted for the strangulation deaths of two women in 1977 and 1979. In October 1984, Cole was sentenced to death in Nevada. When his sentencing was passed he said, "Thanks, Judge." Sometime before his execution he reportedly converted to Catholicism. The victims which Cole was convicted of killing were Kathlyn Blum, Marie Cushman, Sally Thompson, Dorothy King and Wanda Roberts, the latter three of whom were killed in Texas.

On the day of his execution, anti-death penalty campaigners, including the American Civil Liberties Union (ACLU), the United Methodist Church of Reno, and fellow death row inmates tried to have his sentence commuted, but Cole protested. For his last meal, Cole ordered jumbo fried shrimp, french fries, salad with French dressing, and Boston clam chowder. The night before he requested Kentucky Fried Chicken, but guards could only give him chicken nuggets, as he was not allowed to have food with bones. Cole was executed by lethal injection at Nevada State Prison on December 6, 1985, at 2:10 am. His brain was removed hours after his execution and studied for abnormalities at the University of Nevada-Reno medical school.

== See also ==
- List of people executed in Nevada
- List of people executed in the United States in 1985
- List of serial killers by number of victims
- List of serial killers in the United States
- Volunteer (capital punishment)

Executions carried out in Nevada
Preceded by Jesse Bishop October 22, 1979	Carroll Cole; December 6, 1985	Succeeded by William Paul Thompson June 19, 1989
Executions carried out in the United States
Preceded by William Vandiver – Indiana October 16, 1985	Carroll Cole – Nevada; December 6, 1985	Succeeded by James Terry Roach – South Carolina January 10, 1986
