= Nevada Gas =

Short story by writer Raymond Chandler

"Nevada Gas" is a short story by writer Raymond Chandler. It was first published in June 1935 in the magazine Black Mask. The "Nevada gas" of the title refers to cyanide gas, used for executions in the state of Nevada at the time.

== Plot ==
Crooked prosecutor Hugo Candless is at his private club with an employee named George Dial. Dial declines a ride home with Candless, who leaves in a chauffeured limousine. The backseat has been sealed off and rigged to fill with cyanide gas, which the driver activates to kill Candless. Dial is with his lover, Francine Ley, and urges her to ditch her boyfriend. He mentions a scam Candless played on a mobster named Zapparty. Francine’s boyfriend, Johnny De Ruse, comes home and Dial leaves. De Ruse is aware of the affair, and tells Francine he is leaving town after giving evidence against Mops Parisi, a dangerous mobster. He gets kidnapped by the same rigged car, but manages to escape and kill the driver. He traces the plot to Zapparty and goes to his club to confront him. Parisi is there as well. A gunfight ensues; Parisi is killed and Zapparty is captured. He admits the gas car was his way of getting revenge, but Parisi carried it out and blackmailed him over it. De Ruse returns to Candless’s apartment and finds Dial, who is the one who sold out Candless and De Ruse. He is about to skip town with Candless's wife and money, but a security guard kills him and wounds her. De Ruse forgives Francine and takes her back. Easter egg: The license plate is noted as 5A6, but it’s not mentioned that this looks like “GAS” backwards.

== Adaptions ==
The story was made into an episode of the HBO series Philip Marlowe, Private Eye.

== See also ==
- Cyanide poisoning
