= Southern Desert Correctional Center =

Prison in Nevada, United States

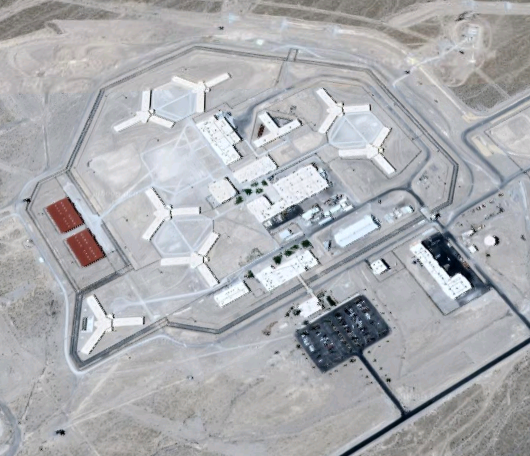
- Interactive map of Southern Desert Correctional Center
- Location: 20825 Cold Creek Road Indian Springs, Nevada; 36°30′54″N 115°33′20″W
- Status: Open
- Security class: Medium
- Capacity: 2149
- Opened: 1982
- Managed by: Nevada Department of Corrections
- Warden: Ronald Oliver

Southern Desert Correctional Center (SDCC) is a Nevada Department of Corrections state prison for men located in Indian Springs in Clark County, Nevada. The capacity is 2149 inmates.

== History ==
Southern Desert Correctional Center opened in February 1982 with seven 102-cell housing units, one of which housed federal prisoners until the NDOC took it over in 1987. A new 200-cell housing unit opened in 1989, and two 240-bed dormitory-style housing units were added in March 2008, bringing the population capacity from 714 in 1982 to its present capacity of 2,149.

On September 23, 2022, an inmate escaped from the facility. Porfirio Duarte-Herrera, one of the perpetrators of the 2007 Luxor bombing, used battery acid to weaken the window of his cell and created a dummy, possibly of cardboard, to fool the guards after exiting through it. His absence was not noticed for several days. Officers only found out he was missing after other inmates informed them of his absence. Duarte-Herrera was recaptured on September 28 at a bus stop in Las Vegas awaiting a bus to Tijuana, Mexico. Following this incident, NDOC director Charles Daniels resigned at the request of Governor Steve Sisolak.
