= Nevada State Prison =

Former prison in Carson City, Nevada

Nevada State Prison (NSP)
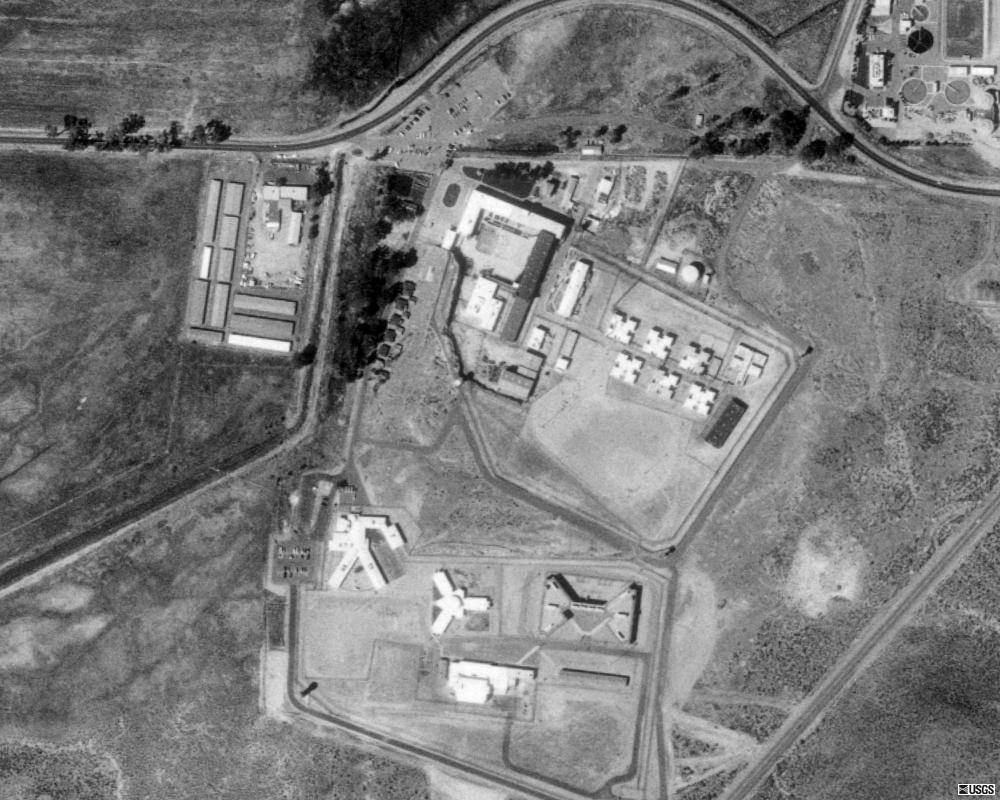
- 1999 aerial photo of the prison
- Interactive map of Nevada State Prison (NSP)
- Location: 3301 E. 5th Street Carson City, Nevada 89702; 39°09′37″N 119°44′15″W
- Status: Permanently closed
- Security class: High
- Capacity: 841
- Population: 0
- Opened: 1862
- Closed: 2012
- Managed by: Nevada Department of Corrections
- Warden: Gregory Smith

Nevada State Prison (NSP) was a penitentiary located in Carson City. The prison was in continuous operation since its establishment in 1862 until its closure in 2012, and was managed by the Nevada Department of Corrections. It was one of the oldest prisons still operating in the United States. The high security facility housed 219 inmates in September 2011. It was designed to hold 841 inmates and employed a staff of 211.

In the early 20th century, the prison became the sole designated facility for executions by the state of Nevada. It carried out the first death sentence by gas chamber in the United States with the execution of Gee Jon on February 8, 1924.

The state of Nevada chose to close the facility for budgetary reasons. The prison closed its doors on May 18, 2012, with all inmates transferred to other institutions or released.

Although the prison has closed, it was still designated as the site of executions for the State of Nevada, until the current execution chamber at Ely State Prison opened in 2016.

== Background ==
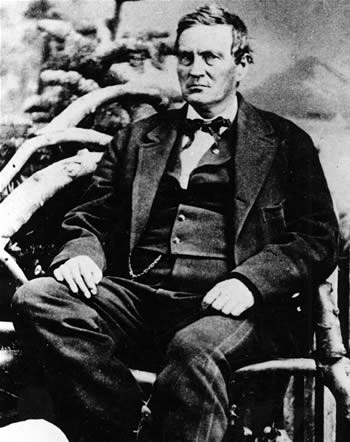
Abraham Curry was the first warden of the prison.

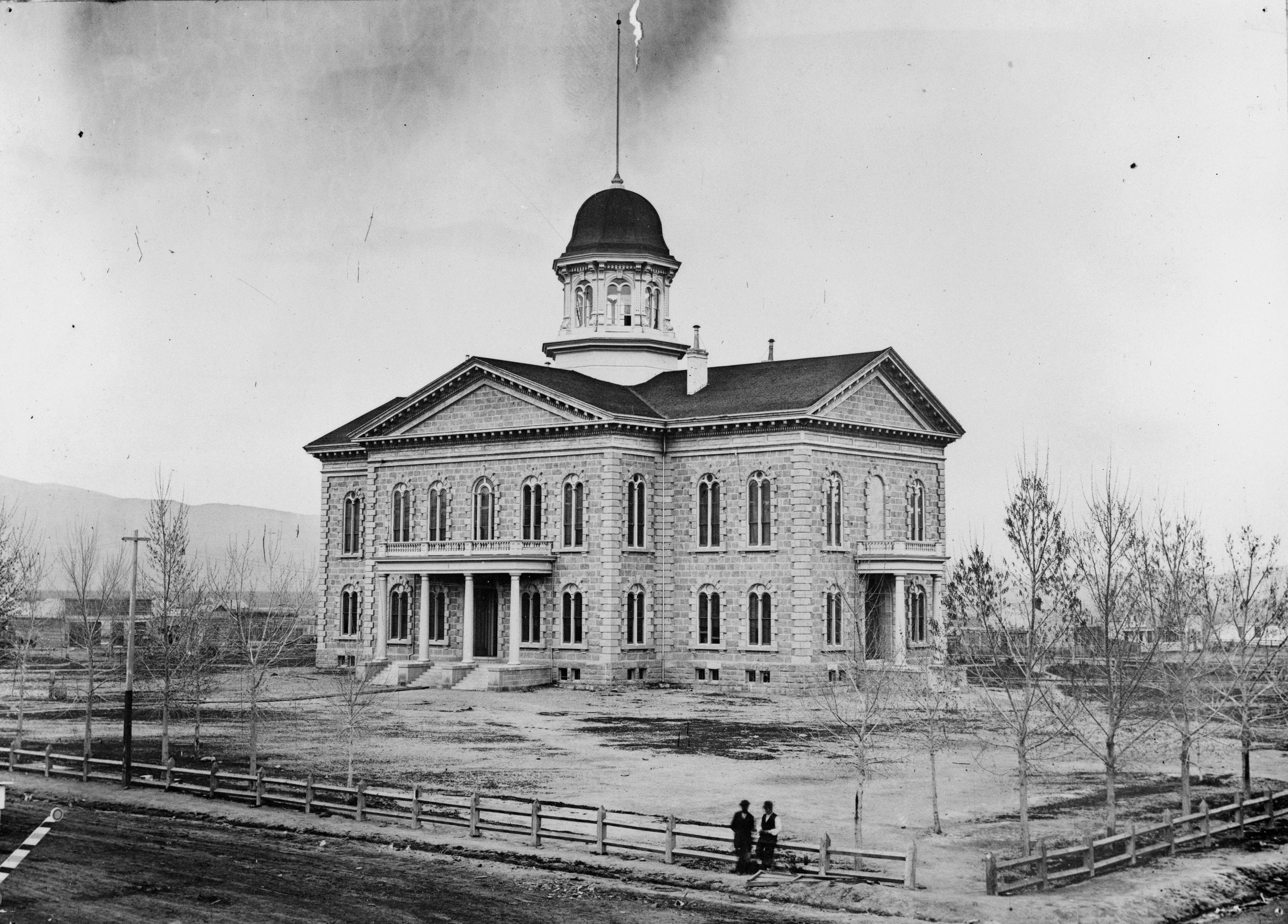
The Nevada State Capitol was built with stone from the prison's quarry.

The prison was established in 1862 by the Nevada Territorial Legislature at the site of the Warm Springs Hotel, located east of Carson City in Nevada Territory. The legislature had been leasing the hotel from Abraham Curry and using the prison quarry to provide stone material for the Nevada State Capitol. In 1864, the territorial legislature acquired the hotel along with 20 acres (8.1 ha) of land from Curry, who was appointed the first warden of the prison. In October of that year, Nevada became a state and the newly written constitution established that the Lieutenant Governor of Nevada also functioned as the ex-officio warden of the prison. The Governor, Secretary of State, and Attorney General comprise the board of prison commissioners.

In 1867, a fire destroyed the original building. In 1870, a major portion of the prison burned down and was rebuilt with inmate labor and stone from the on-site quarry.

On September 17, 1871, lieutenant governor and warden Frank Denver was seriously injured in a prison break that involved 27 inmates. In 1872, Denver refused to concede the prison to Pressly C. Hyman, who had been appointed the new warden under legislation that repealed that responsibility from the lieutenant governor. Governor Lewis R. Bradley sent troops in March 1873 to force Denver to surrender.

The prison was expanded in 1964 by the Northern Nevada Correctional Center. The Nevada State Prison operated as a maximum security facility until 1989, when Ely State Prison was opened to fulfill that function.

=== The Bullpen ===
After Nevada Governor Fred Balzar signed Assembly Bill 98 into law and legalized gambling in the state, Nevada State Prison did the unthinkable and opened a casino for inmates. Nicknamed the Bullpen, the casino was a success for three decades before it was eventually shut down.

The casino operated in a windowless solid rock room carved from natural sandstone surrounding the prison before it was moved to a larger sandstone building with walls sometime in the 1930s. During its 30-year operation, the casino offered traditional games such as blackjack, craps and poker and inmates ran the entire casino, from hosting games to organizing security. Inmates also had their own currency in denominations of 5c, 10c, 25c, 50c, $1 and $5 which were used at the casino. Today, the currency is considered a collector's item.

The Bullpen's closure came after new Nevada Governor Paul Laxalt hired Carl Hocker as the prison's warden. Hocker ordered the casino to be shut down and for gambling to be replaced with more "wholesome" activities such as volleyball, ping pong and painting. The bullpen officially closed in April 1967 and the sandstone building that housed the casino was knocked down.

=== Executions ===
Prior to 2016, prisoners facing capital punishment were held at Ely State Prison and were sent to Nevada State Prison's execution chamber to be executed. In 2016, a new execution chamber was opened at Ely and the chamber at the Nevada State Prison was closed.

This prison became the state-designated facility for all hangings in 1903. In response to Mormon preferences, the Nevada State Legislature passed a statute in 1910 that became effective in January 1911, allowing condemned prisoners to choose between execution by shooting or hanging.

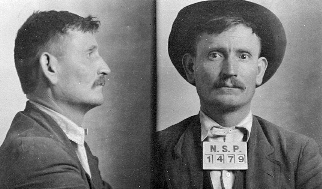
Andriza Mircovich was the first and only inmate in Nevada to be executed by shooting.

On May 14, 1913, Andriza Mircovich became the first and only inmate in Nevada to be executed by shooting. After warden George W. Cowing was unable to find five men to form a firing squad, a shooting machine was built to carry out Mircovich's execution. When the device arrived at the prison, Cowing no longer wanted to have any part of the execution and he resigned. Former governor Denver S. Dickerson, who had worked to reform the state prison system, was appointed the new warden.

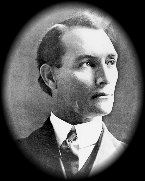
Denver S. Dickerson supervised the first executions by shooting and lethal gas at the prison.

In 1921, a bill authorizing the use of lethal gas had passed the Nevada State Legislature. Condemned murderer Gee Jon of the Hip Sing Tong criminal society became the first person to be executed by this method in the United States. Warden Dickerson sent his assistant Tom Pickett from Carson City to Los Angeles, California to personally pick up 20 pounds of lethal gas, which was contained in a mobile fumigating unit, at a cost of $700. Four guards did not want to participate in the process and resigned. Prison officials first attempted to pump poison gas directly into Gee's cell while he was sleeping, but without success because the gas leaked from the cell. A makeshift gas chamber was set up at the butcher shop of the prison. Gee was strapped onto a chair in the chamber which was eleven feet long, ten feet wide, and eight feet high. A small window next to the wooden chair allowed witnesses to look inside. Attendees included news reporters, public health officials and representatives of the U.S. Army. On the morning of February 8, 1924, the pump sprayed four pounds of hydrocyanic acid into the chamber. Because an electric heater failed, the chamber was 52 degrees fahrenheit instead of the ideal 75 degrees, causing some of the acid to form a puddle on the floor. Gee's head appeared to nod up and down for six minutes before he succumbed to the gas. The prison staff waited three hours for the remaining puddle of hydrocyanic acid to evaporate before cleaning up the chamber. Warden Dickerson reported to Nevada governor James G. Scrugham and the legislature his opinion that the use of lethal gas was impractical and that he thought execution by firing squad was still the best method of execution. Expenditures for Gee's execution totaled about $1,000, but the operating cost of the gas chamber plummeted to about 90 cents per use by 1937. Dickerson remained warden of Nevada State Prison until his death on November 28, 1925.

On October 22, 1979, convicted murderer Jesse Bishop became the first person to be executed at the prison after the state legislature reinstated the death penalty, following the lifting of a national moratorium on capital punishment. Bishop is also the last prisoner to be executed by lethal gas by the state. On December 6, 1985, serial killer Carroll Cole became the first inmate to be executed in Nevada by lethal injection. Executions continue to be carried out in the gas chamber, but on a gurney designed for lethal injection.

In 2012, the department considered a capital improvement program that would relocate the execution chamber from Nevada State Prison to Ely State Prison. The current execution chamber at Ely opened in 2016.

=== Operations before closure ===
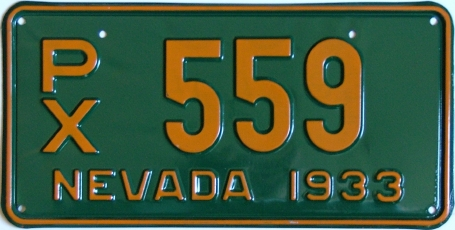
All license plates in Nevada had been made at the prison since 1928.

Nevada State Prison employed and provided vocational training for inmates in its factories, which produced mattresses and license plates. The prison manufactured all Nevada vehicle registration plates since 1928. The prison industries also included a bookbindery and print shop. Minimum security inmates were eligible for forklift training.

Inmates were offered the opportunity to earn a GED or take collegiate courses through Western Nevada College.

After the closure of Nevada State Prison, the license plate factory was relocated to Northern Nevada Correctional Center.

=== Closure ===
In 2009, the Nevada state legislature rejected a proposal by Governor Jim Gibbons to close the prison amid a budget crisis, and instead approved the continued operation of the prison while plans to expand or construct other new prisons were delayed. In February 2010, Nevada Department of Corrections Director Howard Skolnik notified employees that the prison system faced an $880 million deficit. Prison officials recommended moving the inmates to other facilities in the state prison system and converting the site into a tourist attraction or training center. The prison closed in May 2012.

=== Museum Status ===
On May 25, 2015, then-Governor Brian Sandoval approved Assembly Bill 377, ordering the preservation of the site of the Nevada State Prison and commissioning it as a museum for historical, cultural, and educational use. The bill took effect on July 1, 2015. Today, the Nevada State Prison Preservation Society, formed on November 1, 2012, runs tours and exhibits in the prison-turned-museum, sharing the 150-year history of the Nevada State Prison. It is on the National Register of Historic Places.

== In popular culture ==
The closed prison was used as the setting for the 2019 film The Mustang, a drama about an inmate in a rehabilitation program for training wild horses.

According to the Nevada State Prison Preservation Society's Facebook page and cbs42.com, the Dark Prison Haunt at Nevada State Prison was named one of the top haunts of 2025 in the USA. The honor suggests recognition from within the haunted attraction industry.

== Notable inmates ==
Inmate	Number	Status	Description
Jesse Bishop	—	Executed October 22, 1979	First degree murder
Thomas Lee Bean	8630	Life imprisonment	First degree murder
Alvaro Calambro	46011	Executed April 5, 1999	First degree murder (2 counts)
Carroll Cole	20163	Executed December 6, 1985	First degree murder
Gerald Gallego	19735	Transferred to Ely State Prison	First degree murder
Alice Maud Hartley		Pardoned 1897	Second degree murder
Gee Jon	2320	Executed February 8, 1924	First degree murder
Troy Kell	24333	Transferred to Central Utah Correctional Facility	First degree murder
Jimmy Lerner	61634	Released January 2, 2002	Manslaughter
Daryl Linnie Mack	44532	Executed April 26, 2006	First degree murder
Andriza Mircovich	1479	Executed May 14, 1913	First degree murder
Richard Allen Moran	20563	Executed March 30, 1996	First degree murder
Joseph Mitchell Parsons	17976	Paroled August 1987, and executed on October 15, 1999, at Utah State Prison	Armed robbery
William Paul Thompson	20065	Executed June 19, 1989	First degree murder

== Wardens ==
#	Name	Start	End
1	Abraham Curry	January 1, 1862	March 1, 1864
2	Robert M. Howland	March 1, 1864	March 4, 1865
3	John S. Crosman	March 4, 1865	January 7, 1867
4	James S. Slingerland	January 1867	January 1869
5	Frank Denver	January 1869	March 1873 (removed)
6	Pressly C. Hyman	March 1873	March 1877
7	C. C. Batterman	March 1877	March 1881
8	William Garrard	March 1881	March 1883
9	Frank Bell	March 1883	February 14, 1887
10	Frank McCullough	February 14, 1887	January 1893
11	Frank Bell	February 1893	February 1895
12	L. O. Henderson	February 1895	February 1903
13	J. L. Considine	February 1903	May 1907
14	S. H. Day	May 1907	October 1908
15	W. J. Maxwell	October 1908	January 15, 1911
16	Raymond T. Baker	February 1, 1911	May 10, 1912
17	George W. Cowing	May 10, 1912	January 10, 1913
18	Denver S. Dickerson	March 10, 1913	December 5, 1916
19	Rufus B. Henrichs	December 5, 1916	December 1923
20	Denver S. Dickerson	December 23, 1923	November 28, 1925 (died)
21	Matthew R. Penrose	1925	1935
22	William L. Lewis		
23	Richard Sheeny		
24	Arthur Bernard	January 1951	April 1959
25	Jack Fogliani	1959	January 30, 1967 (fired)
26	Carl G. Hocker	January 30, 1967	April 1973
27	Ed Pogue	April 1973	August 1976 (Resigned and relocated to Southern Nevada Correctional Center)
28	Charles L. Wolff	1976	November 30, 1981
29	John Slansky	1978	1987
30	George W. Sumner	November 30, 1981	May 1985
31	Harold Whitley	August 7, 1985	
32	Pete Demosthenes		
33	John Ignacio		August 2000 (retired)
34	Donald L. Helling	September 2000	
35	Michael J. Budge		January 1, 2006 (retired)
36	William Donat	January 1, 2006	January 30, 2009 (retired)
37	Gregory Smith	January 30, 2009	May 18, 2012

== See also ==
- List of Nevada state prisons
- Nevada Department of Corrections
