= Gee Jon =

Criminal gang member, executed by gas in 1924 in Nevada, US

- 朱家休
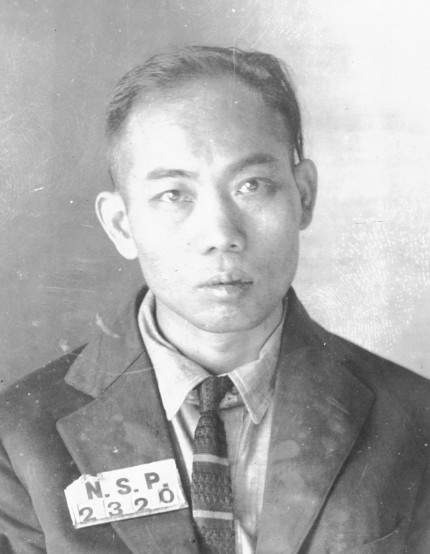
- Nevada State Prison mugshot
- Born: c. 1895; Canton, Qing China
- Died: February 8, 1924 (aged 29); Nevada State Prison, Nevada, U.S.
- Other names: Gee Gar Hue; Jon Gee; E. Z. John
- Occupation: Cook
- Known for: First person executed by gas chamber in the United States
- Height: 5 ft 4 in (1.63 m)
- Status: Executed by gas chamber
- Conviction: First degree murder
- Penalty: Death

Chinese name
- Chinese: 朱家休
Transcriptions
Standard Mandarin
- Hanyu Pinyin: Zhū Jiāxiū
Yue: Cantonese
- Jyutping: zyu1 gaa1 jau1

Gee Jon (Chinese: 朱家休; c. 1895 – February 8, 1924) was a Chinese national who was the first person in the United States to be executed by lethal gas. Gee was sentenced to death for the 1921 murder of Tom Quong Kee in Mina, Nevada as part of a gang dispute. An unsuccessful attempt to pump poison gas directly into his cell at Nevada State Prison led to the development of the gas chamber.

== Background ==
Gee Jon was born around 1895 in Canton to a Cantonese family. He immigrated to the United States between 1907 and 1908. He spent most of his life at San Francisco's Chinatown in California, though he was recorded as having lived in the Chinatown area of Stockton for three months. Gee became a member of the Hip Sing Tong, which dealt in narcotics and liquor. In 1922, territorial disputes with the Bing Kong Tong led to the outbreak of hostilities.

== Murder of Tom Quong Kee ==
Gee Jon killed Tom Quong Kee in Mina, Nevada.

Gee Jon was ordered by Hip Sing officials to perform a gang hit on 74-year-old Chinese laundry proprietor Tom Quong Kee (Chinese: 譚廣京; pinyin: Tán Guǎngjīng; Jyutping: taam4 gwong2 ging1), a nominal member of the Bing Kong Tong, as well as the Four Brothers Tong. Hughie Sing, a 19-year-old from Carson City, newly recruited to the Hip Sing Tong and Gee's apprentice of two months, pointed Tom out as a target, having lived with Tom as an apprentice for two years before. They traveled to Mina from Reno on the 18th or 20 August, reportedly being seen by deputy sheriff W. J. Hammill asking about work at the local Palace Café. By then Hammill had heard rumors that the men he had seen were Tong members in town to kill Tom Quong Kee and were pretending to be job-seekers on their way to Tonopah as a cover.

On the night of August 27, 1921, Gee and Sing knocked on the door of Tom's cabin, the former armed with a .38 caliber Colt revolver. When Tom answered the door in his pajamas, Gee, who was standing behind Sing, killed the elderly man with two shots to the heart. Tom's body was discovered the next morning by one of his friends, reporting his find to justice of the peace L. E. Cornelius, who in turn alerted Hammill. After finding two sets of footprints at the crime scene, Hammill made a possible link to the presence of two strangers he had seen the week before. Gee and Sing were apprehended the next morning on August 28 in Reno after Hammill phoned chief of police John Kirkley about two possible murder suspects driving back from Mina. Their arrests were considered unusual, as other Tong killings typically went unsolved, with at least three additional murders with suspected Tong involvement being reported by the end of August. However, Tom's murder was of particular interest as it was one of the few instances where violence between the warring factions took place outside of California. During interrogation, Sing confessed to his role in the murder and implicated Gee as the one to fire the fatal shots, under the belief that this would lead to his immediate release from custody. Both were held without bail at Mina jail.

The Lung Kong Tin Yee Tong and Guan Kong Yee Tong had already issued rewards of $500 and $300 respectively for the capture of Tom's killers (equivalent to $9000 and $5400 in 2025), but accepted a trial through the official courts.

=== Trial and sentencing ===
Gee and Sing were defended by attorneys James M. Frame and Fiore Raffetto. During their preliminary hearing on September 8, 1921, Sing recanted his confession and entered a not guilty plea along with Gee. That same year, trial took place from November 28 to December 3 at the Seventh Judicial District Court for Mineral County in Hawthorne, Nevada. A jury found them guilty of first-degree murder and in February 1922, both were sentenced to death by Judge J. Emmet Walsh. A motion for a new trial by Frame was denied. A bill authorizing the use of lethal gas had passed the Nevada State Legislature in 1921, making Gee and Sing eligible to become the first people to be executed by this method. They were incarcerated at the death row of Nevada State Prison in Carson City. While on death row, Gee's weight dropped from 129 pounds (59 kg) to 90 pounds (41 kg) by the time of his execution.

=== Appeals ===
For the next three years, Frame and Raffetto remained focus on overturning Gee and Sing's death sentence, taking nearly no other cases during this time. Frame argued that Gee's sentence constituted cruel and unusual punishment, but his appeal was denied in January 1923. The Supreme Court of Nevada instead complimented the state legislators for "inflicting the death penalty in the most humane manner known to modern science". Raffetto unsuccessfully filed a writ of certiorari with the U.S. 9th Circuit Court of Appeals in San Francisco and a second appeal to the state supreme court was blocked. In January 1924, they started several petitions for life imprisonment across Nevada, supported by students of the University of Nevada, Reno and the Reno branch of the League of Women Voters. Media reported on this with mixed reactions, particularly in regards to the fact that Gee and Sing were of Chinese descent. The Fallon Standard opined that if Sing had been white, he would have received a second-degree murder conviction at most while the Tonopah Daily Times remained in support of execution to dissuade gang violence, referring to the condemned as "Chinese coolies".

On January 25, 1924, Sing's sentence was commuted to life imprisonment because he was only nineteen years old and Gee had been the one to commit the shooting, also highlighting that unlike Gee, who was described as "an illiterate Chinese unacquainted with American customs", Sing had been born in the United States, was educated at a bilingual grammar school and had cooperated with the authorities; he was released on parole in 1938. In an attempt to have Gee resentenced as well, three final appeals were launched by Frame to the state supreme court, the Ormsby County District Court and the U.S. District Court in Carson City, but all were denied between February 4–7, 1924. Gee was initially intended to be gassed alongside another murderer, Mexican national Thomas Russell, whose sentence was commuted to life imprisonment a day before the execution date.

== Death ==
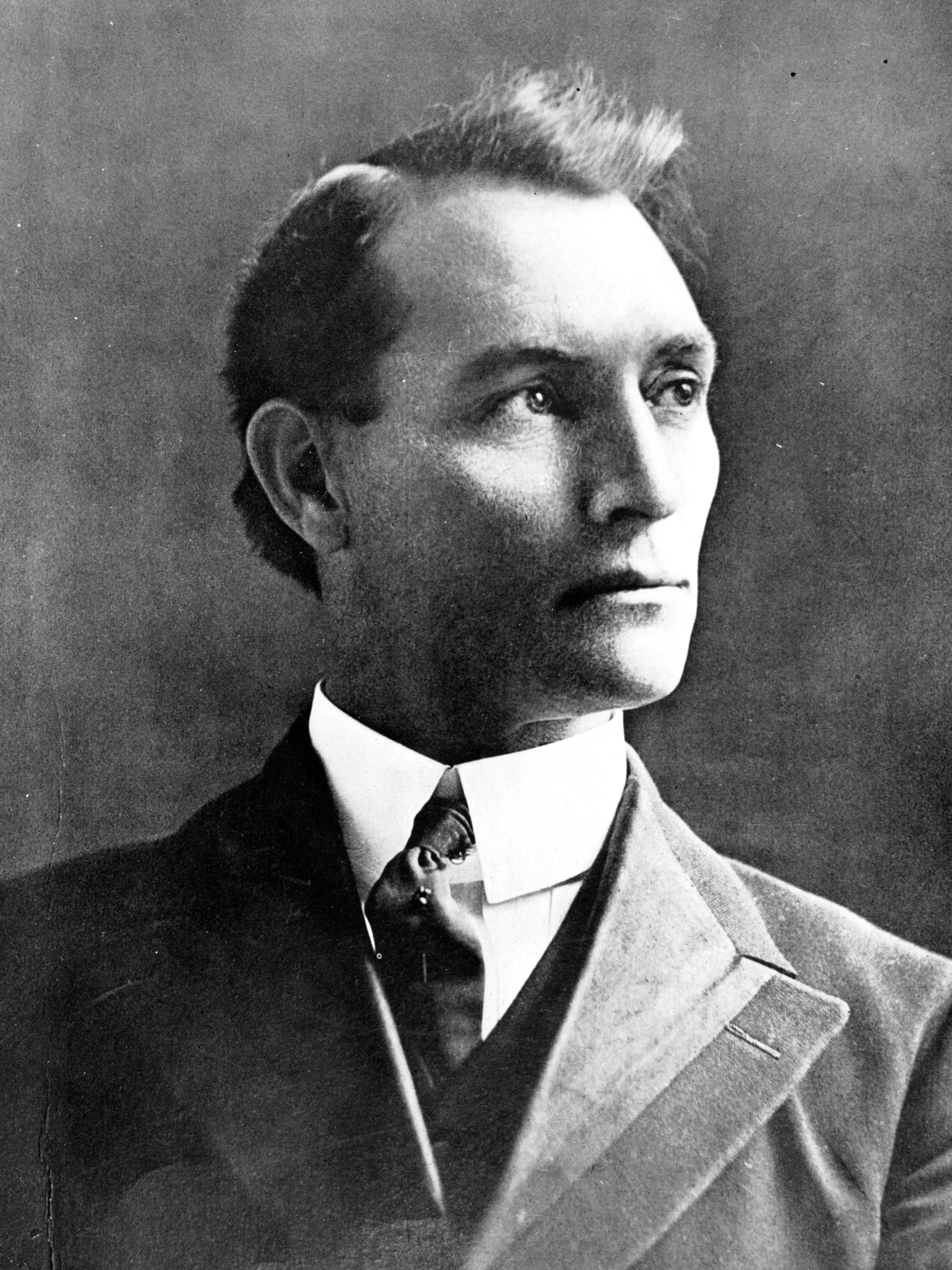
Denver S. Dickerson supervised the execution.

=== Preparation ===
The California Cyanide Company of Los Angeles, California, was the only distributor of liquid cyanide in the western United States and refused to deliver it to Carson City over liability concerns. The poison was used to eradicate pests from citrus groves in California. Warden Denver S. Dickerson sent his assistant Tom Pickett to Los Angeles to personally pick up 20 lb (9.1 kg) of lethal gas, which was contained in a mobile fumigating unit that cost $700 (equivalent to $13,000 in 2025). Four guards who did not want to participate in the process had resigned. The officials first attempted to pump poison gas directly into Gee's cell while he was sleeping, but without success because the gas leaked from the cell. A makeshift gas chamber was set up at the butcher shop of the prison, measuring eleven feet long, ten feet wide, and eight feet high. A small window next to the wooden chair allowed witnesses to look inside. The chamber was built by other convicts, five of whom were later placed in solitary confinement for refusing to aid in construction, after two imprisoned Industrial Workers of the World members voiced opposition to the experimental execution. A day before the execution, E. B. Walker, the private chemical contractor in charge of handling the cyanide, tested the lethal effectiveness of the chamber using a cat and two kittens. It was declared that the animals "died apparently instantly and without pain" in 15 seconds by the estimate of medical and chemical experts.

=== Execution ===
Gee Jon was executed in the morning hours of February 8, 1924. The prior evening, Gee had a final visitation with two friends and a cousin, and made his last statement to a journalist, calling "gas all the same as rope or shoot'em gun" and saying that he had "no worry". Gee, who had fasted for the past ten days, agreed to have a last meal, consisting of ham, eggs, toast, and a cup of coffee. At 9:35 a.m., Gee was escorted out of his cell, passing through the prison yard to the butcher shop. A guard transporting Gee to the gas chamber reportedly muttered "Die like a man, Jon" to the inmate as he was tied onto a metal bench while the cyanide was being prepared. Gee wept as he was strapped into the chair until the captain of the guards told him to "Brace up!" After Gee was strapped in, one guard left and closed the chamber, inadvertently locking in the second guard, who was let out after pounding on the door. Around thirty attendees, including news reporters, public health officials, and representatives of the U.S. Army, served as witnesses to the execution, many of whom smoked cigarettes before and during the execution, believing that tobacco smoke would act "as protection against vagrant gas fumes that might drift their way".

At 9:40 a.m. the pump sprayed 4 lb (1.8 kg) of hydrocyanic acid into the chamber. The weather was cold and humid. Because an electric heater failed, the chamber was 52 °F (11 °C) instead of the ideal 75 °F (24 °C), causing some of the acid to form a puddle on the floor. Gee turned his head to look for the source of the noise, then appeared to lose consciousness in about five seconds, with his head continuing to nod up and down for six minutes. During this time, an attending physician had declared Gee dead and encouraged attendees to examine him closely through the glass, only for Gee to jerk his head up again. He was completely motionless after ten minutes. Some of the witnesses momentarily thought they smelled the odor of almond blossoms, thought to be the odor of cyanide, leaking from the chamber. The warden had the witnesses cleared from the area. At about 10:00 a.m., a vent was opened, and a fan was turned on to discharge the poison gas. The prison staff waited for the remaining puddle of hydrocyanic acid to evaporate before cleaning up the chamber. Gee's body was removed from the chamber at 12:20 p.m. and taken to the prison hospital. A group of seven doctors pronounced him dead but did not conduct an autopsy on the body out of concern that some remaining gas could be released. Gee was 29 years old when he died and his body was buried at the Carson City Penitentiary cemetery (now next to Warm Springs Correctional Center).

Just after the execution, one of the physicians who examined Gee's body, Delos A. Turner, a Major of the U.S. Veterans' Bureau in Reno, asked for permission to perform medical experiments "in the interests of science." Turner wanted to inject Gee's corpse with camphor, believing that it would bring Gee back to life. Dickerson denied the request. Turner had already caused a disturbance before the execution by announcing his intention to revive Gee to attendants. Another physician professed his belief that Gee had not died by gas inhalation but due to "cold and exposure". The disputed cause of death also caused concern for residents of Mineral County, some of whom feared that Gee "went to his grave in a state of suspended animation" and would haunt the area as a vengeful spectre.

=== Reaction ===
Before the execution, on January 28, 1924, Frank Curran, the former district attorney who had written the lethal gas legislation in 1921, voiced his opposition to the execution stating that the use of hydrogen cyanide would be "as brutal as clubbing a man to death".

Newspapers reported overwhelmingly positive on the new execution method, citing witnesses who described Gee's death as painless by their own judgement. The Nevada State Journal proclaimed, "Nevada's novel death law is upheld by the highest court—humanity." However, the San Jose Mercury News printed, "One hundred years from now Nevada will be referred to as a heathen commonwealth controlled by savages with only the outward symbols of civilization." The Sigma Chi fraternity similarly criticized the new form of capital punishment, writing "All [Nevada] has done is add horror to a thing that at its best and easiest makes civilization shudder".

Warden Dickerson reported to Nevada governor James G. Scrugham and the legislature his opinion that the use of lethal gas was impractical and that he thought execution by firing squad was still the best method of execution.

== See also ==
- Capital punishment in Nevada
- Capital punishment in the United States
- List of people executed in Nevada
- List of people executed in the United States in 1924
