= Elizabeth Potts =

English murderer (1846-1890)

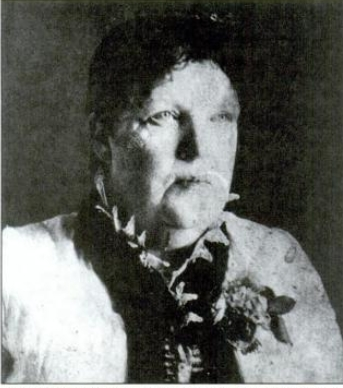
- Born: Elizabeth Atherton; December 21, 1846; Manchester, England
- Died: June 20, 1890 (aged 43); Elko, Nevada, U.S.
- Occupation: Housewife
- Known for: Convicted of murder; only woman legally executed in Nevada
- Status: Executed
- Conviction: First degree murder
- Penalty: Death

Elizabeth Potts (née Atherton; December 21, 1846 – June 20, 1890) was convicted of murder in 1889 and hanged the following year, the only woman ever to be legally executed in the U.S. state of Nevada. Her husband, Josiah Potts, was executed simultaneously, having been convicted of the murder and partial dismemberment of 57 year old, British born, Miles Fawcett.

== Biography ==
Born Elizabeth Atherton in Hulme, Manchester, England; Potts was the daughter of Michael Atherton and Jane Bradshaw. Her father was an engineer who died two years prior to her marriage to Josiah Potts (1842–1890) in Manchester, England. Her mother was originally from Orrell, Greater Manchester and was a beerhouse keeper during the 1860’s. Her paternal ancestors were from Wigan.

At the age of 19, Potts emigrated from the Port of Liverpool to the United States with her husband and one year old daughter, Alice May, departing on the SS City of Cork and arriving in New York on May 16, 1864. The young family were able to make the journey in their own cabin instead of steerage.

Potts settled in Milwaukee, Wisconsin and was mother to at least eight children, including, in addition to Alice May, a son named George (b. 1866), a daughter named Virginia Louise (b. 1868), a daughter Leisna (or Sarna, records differ, born July 1869 in Wisconsin), a son named Charles Henry (b. ca. 1871), a daughter Ida May(b. ca. 1878), a son named Frank Leo (b. 1881), and a daughter named Edith (b. 1883).

Her husband Josiah, a machinist, secured a position with the Central Pacific Railroad, and the Potts family moved west, initially to Terrace, Utah, and in 1886, onto Carlin, Nevada.

Potts temporarily separated from her husband, possibly due to financial hardships and traveled to Fresno, California, where she willingly entered into a bigamous marriage with Miles Fawcett (1830-1888), an English born carpenter in 1887.

Potts subsequently returned to her marital home in Carlin, Nevada to be with Josiah. At the same time Fawcett became a boarder in the Potts household. Shortly after, Fawcett purchased a ranch nearby, and moved there, however he continued to visit Potts regularly and she provided him with bread and washed his laundry.

== The disappearance and untimely death of Miles Fawcett ==
On January 1, 1888, Fawcett told a friend, J.P. Linebarger, that he intended to visit the Pottses to collect some money they owed him, and that he had knowledge about Elizabeth's past that he could use to convince her to pay the debt. Fawcett and Linebarger arrived together at the Potts' home, and Potts invited Fawcett to spend the night. Fawcett accepted, and Linebarger left. Fawcett was never seen alive again. In the days that followed, when questioned about Fawcett’s disappearance, Potts husband, Josiah said that Fawcett had been called away on business in another state.

In the summer of 1888, Potts and her family moved to Rock Springs, Wyoming, and their house in Carlin was rented to a family named Brewer. In January 1889, George Brewer discovered mutilated human remains in the home's cellar. The remains were identified as those of Miles Fawcett. Potts, and her husband Josiah were arrested for the murder of Fawcett. There are multiple inconsistencies in press articles, such as Fawcett being a 70 year old at the time of death and his remains being found under the floorboards of his own home.

== Death and legacy ==
Potts and her husband Josiah were indicted for murder in the first degree and tried. They were both convicted of murder and sentenced to the death penalty. A double gallows, manufactured in Placerville, California, was obtained for the hanging and invitations were issued to attend the June 20, 1890, event. With 52 men in attendance, they were hanged simultaneously. Josiah's death was slow, and Elizabeth's head was almost torn from her body by the noose, and her white gown covered in blood. The initial interment was at the Elko Cemetery but they were re-interred in a common grave when the cemetery was relocated. Potts is the only woman to be legally executed in the history of Nevada. The hanging of this husband and wife was the last legal execution in Elko County; a state law passed in 1901 ended the practice of conducting executions in Nevada's county seats.

The circumstances behind Potts' bigamous marriage was not public knowledge until after the execution was first reported in August 1890. The story was picked up by a San Francisco journalist two years later who told a tale of romance and crime, where a husband and wife met their death by execution whilst retaining a secret which, if revealed, might have saved them from the gallows.
