= Zeb Kendall House =

Historic house in Nevada, United States

- U.S. National Register of Historic Places
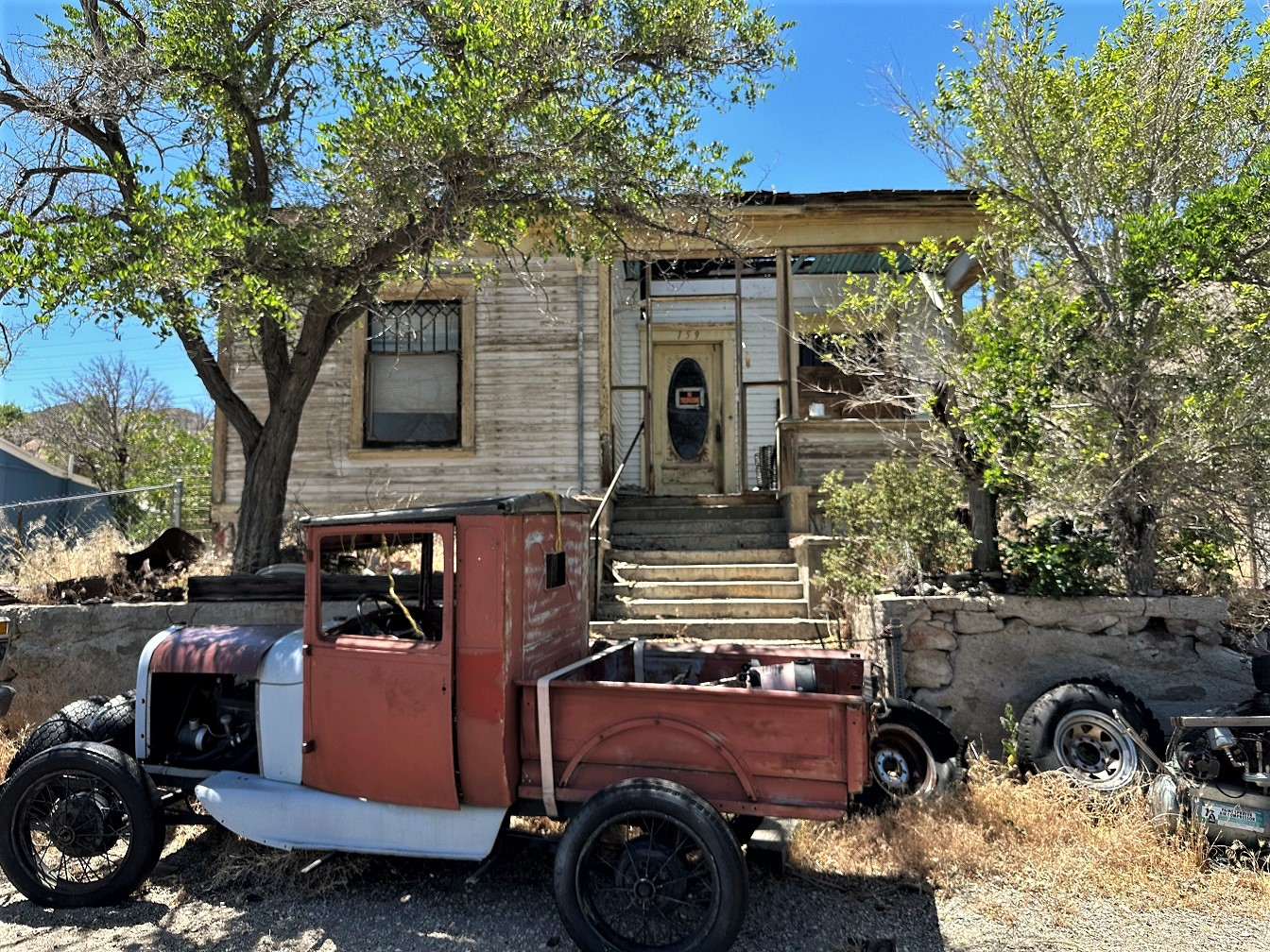

- Location within Nevada Location within the United States
- Location: 159 University Ave. Tonopah, Nevada
- Coordinates: 38.06603°N 117.23354°W
- Area: less than one acre
- Built: 1906
- Architectural style: Neo-Colonial
- MPS: Tonopah MRA
- NRHP reference No.: 82003233
- Added to NRHP: May 20, 1982

The Zeb Kendall House, at 159 University Ave. in Tonopah, Nevada, United States, was built in 1906. It was listed on the National Register of Historic Places in 1982.

It was deemed significant for its association with Zebeniezer "Zeb" Kendall (d.1954), a prominent Tonopah citizen who developed mining interests, operated the Palace Hotel, and represented Nye County in the Nevada state legislature. It is also significant for its architecture as a well-preserved Neo-Colonial wood-frame structure.
