= Nevada Department of Corrections =

U.S. state government agency

- Abbreviation: NDOC

Agency overview
- Formed: 1862

Jurisdictional structure
- Operations jurisdiction: Nevada, United States
- Map of Nevada Department of Corrections's jurisdiction
- Area: 110,567 square miles (286,370 km^{2})
- Population: 3,060,150 (2017 Census)
- Legal jurisdiction: State of Nevada
- General nature: Civilian police

Operational structure
- Headquarters: Carson City, Nevada
- Elected officer responsible: Joe Lombardo, Governor of Nevada
- Agency executives: James Dzurenda, Director; Calvin Johnson, Deputy Director of Operations

Facilities
- Correctional Facilities Conservation Camps: 11 10

Website
- doc.nv.gov

The Nevada Department of Corrections (NDOC) is a governmental agency in the U.S. state of Nevada. The NDOC headquarters is located on the property of the Stewart Indian School in Carson City.

== History ==
In 1862, the first prison in Nevada was created by the Territorial Legislature. The Legislature leased the property of the Warm Springs Hotel, just east of Carson City, for use as a Prison. This property was owned by Abraham Curry, who operated the Warm Springs Hotel on the property, which was also the meeting place of the Territorial Legislature. This prison is located on what is now Fifth Street in Carson. Curry became the first Warden of the Prison. A quarry on the site of the Prison was used for stone for the State Capitol and other public buildings. It also provided materials for the construction of the Prison and was the major work activity for inmates for many years.

In 1864, the Territorial Legislature purchased the site of the Prison from Curry and an additional 20 acres (8.1 ha) for $80,000. Nevada became a State in October of that year, and the new constitution provided that the Lieutenant Governor of the State also served as the Warden of the Prison. The Governor, Secretary of State, and the Attorney General were named as the Board of Prison Commissioners, an arrangement that continues today.

In May 1870, a substantial portion of the prison burned and construction of new facilities began immediately, using the native stone and inmate labor. Portions of that early construction are still visible in the current structure of the Prison. This Nevada State Prison remained the only state correctional facility in Nevada for many decades. Both men and women were housed in the facility, in separate areas. Expansion of the Prison began in the early 1960s with the construction of a second facility on Carson City, which became the Northern Nevada correctional Center. A separate institution was also constructed next to the Nevada State Prison, for the separate housing of female offenders. The construction of the first facility in the Las Vegas area was completed in early 1978.

There are presently seven major institutions; two transitional housing centers; 9 conservation camps; and one Boot Camp operated by the Department of Corrections.

== Training ==
State of Nevada Correction Officers (C/O's) are fully sworn Peace Officers per 18 U.S.C 926(b) Qualified Law Enforcement Officers and are recognized under the Nevada Revised Statutes(NRS's). Correctional cadets undergo a hiring process through the department's personnel unit in Carson City, Las Vegas and Ely, Nevada. Written, physical and psychological exams are administered before a person can enter the 8 week academy. Upon acceptance, an enrollee is now a CO/T (correctional officer trainee.) Trainees must attend and successfully complete didactic (classroom) and physical training. Upon academy graduation, CO/T's are assigned to institutions and are of probationary status for 1 year. According to the NRS's, the definition of any probationary employee means the person may be terminated at any time for any-or no reason.

== Security levels ==
The Nevada Department of Corrections utilizes five custody levels. These custody levels are:

- Maximum - This is the most restrictive custody level in the Department. These inmates may not exit their cells without constant, direct supervision. They have a very high potential for violence, and are generally segregated from one another.
- Close - This level is assigned to inmates who require housing in a very secure institution or who require frequent, direct supervision. These are inmates with a high potential for misconduct or escape.
- Medium - This is the largest custody category of inmates. This is the custody assigned to inmates who would be an escape risk if they were not inside a secure institution, but who are expected to behave without constant, direct supervision. These are the general population inmates of most institutions.
- Minimum - This custody is used for inmates who are not considered escape risks when supervised. When they are away from their assigned facility, they must be supervised by a State employee. The facilities they live in do not have gun towers or barrier fences.
- Community Trustee - This is the least restrictive level, and generally applies to inmates assigned to restitution centers or to State government jobs in Carson City. These inmates are not supervised when they are away from their assigned facility.

Inmates not confined to institutions, yet still monitored by the Department of Corrections are assigned to Residential Confinement. These inmates meet a strict criminal history and behavioral criteria and are supervised by the Division of Parole & Probation. In this program inmates live in their residence and work in the community. When not at work or authorized appointments the inmates remain in their residence under electronic surveillance

== Organization ==
The headquarters facility resides in the former Stewart Indian School in Carson City, with the central offices in Building 17.

The department also has Las Vegas area (southern) offices which include the headquarters of the Prison Industries program, the department's medical and investigation sections, the southern administrative office, and a personnel office. The southern offices are on the property of the Casa Grande Transitional Housing facility.

== Death row ==
The death row for men was located at Ely State Prison, but since September 2024 it is now located in High Desert State Prison. The death row for women is in the Florence McClure Women's Correctional Center (previously Southern Nevada Women's Correctional Center).

The execution chamber at Ely State Prison opened in 2016. Previously it was located in a former gas chamber in Nevada State Prison in Carson City. Nevada executes inmates via lethal injection. Due to a lack of elevator access this gas chamber was not compliant with the Americans with Disabilities Act of 1990 (ADA). Greg Cox, the director of the Nevada DOC, stated that he anticipated a legal challenge to carrying out the execution there if an execution date is set. In 2012, the department was considering a capital improvement program that would relocate the execution chamber from Nevada State Prison to Ely State Prison.

== Facilities ==
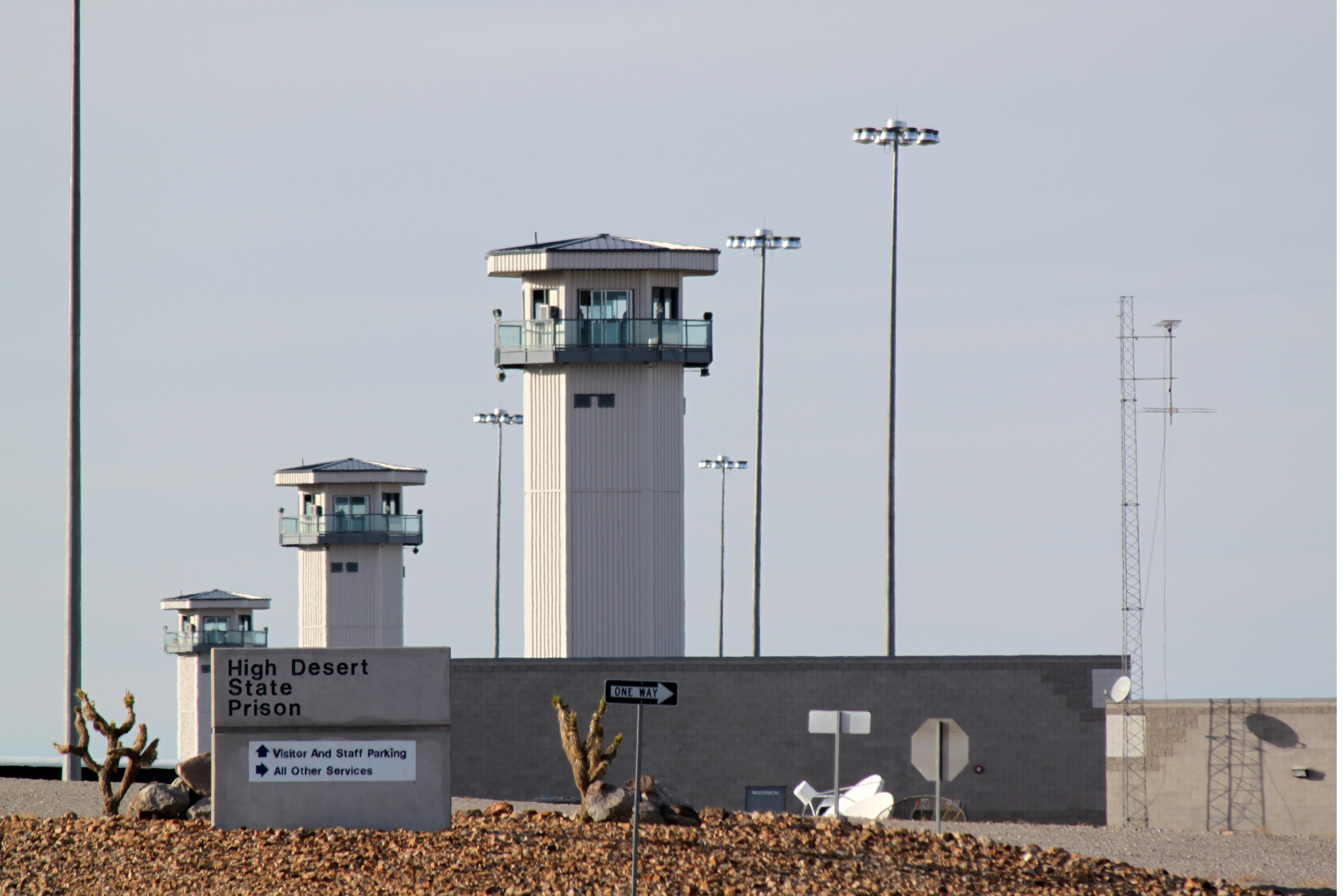
High Desert State Prison

- List of Nevada state prisons

== Fallen officers ==
Since the establishment of the Nevada Department of Corrections (1862), five officers have died in the line of duty. Two officers who died in the line of duty while employed by the Nevada State Prison.

== See also ==
- List of United States state correction agencies
- List of law enforcement agencies in Nevada
- Denver S. Dickerson
