= Competence (law) =

Ability to understand the nature and effect of the act in which the person is engaged

In United States and Canadian law, competence concerns the mental capacity of an individual to participate in legal proceedings or transactions, and the mental condition a person must have to be responsible for his or her decisions or acts. Competence is an attribute that is decision-specific. Depending on various factors which typically revolve around mental function integrity, an individual may or may not be competent to make a particular medical decision, a particular contractual agreement, to execute an effective deed to real property, or to execute a will having certain terms.

Depending on the state, a guardian or conservator may be appointed by a court for a person who satisfies the state's tests for general incompetence, and the guardian or conservator exercises the incompetent's rights for the incompetent. Defendants who do not possess sufficient "competence" are usually excluded from criminal prosecution, while witnesses found not to possess requisite competence cannot testify. The English equivalent is fitness to plead.

== United States ==
The word incompetent is used to describe persons who should not undergo or partake in certain judicial processes, and also for those who lack mental capacity to make contracts, handle their financial and other personal matters such as consenting to medical treatment, etc. and need a legal guardian to handle their affairs.

=== Competence to stand trial ===
In United States law, the right to not be prosecuted while one is incompetent to stand trial has been ruled by the United States Supreme Court to be guaranteed under the Due Process Clause. If the court determines that a defendant's mental condition makes him unable to understand the proceedings, or that he is unable to help in his defense, he is found incompetent. The competency evaluation, as determined in Dusky v. United States, is whether the accused "has sufficient present ability to consult with his lawyer with a reasonable degree of rational understanding—and whether he has a rational as well as factual understanding of the proceedings against him." Being determined incompetent is substantially different from undertaking an insanity defense; competence regards the defendant's state of mind at the time of the trial, while insanity regards his state of mind at the time of the crime. In New York a hearing on competence to stand trial may be referred to as a "730 exam", after the law that governs the conduct of the exam, New York CPL Sec. 730.

In 2006, the United States Court of Appeals for the Tenth Circuit considered the legal standards for determining competence to stand trial and to waive counsel using the standards of objective unreasonableness under the Antiterrorism and Effective Death Penalty Act.

A ruling of incompetence may later be reversed. A defendant may recover from a mental illness or disability, and a court may require a defendant to undergo treatment in an effort to render him competent to stand trial. For example, in 1989, Kenneth L. Curtis of Stratford, Connecticut was found mentally incompetent to stand trial following the murder of his estranged girlfriend. But years later, as he had attended college and received good grades, this ruling was reversed, and he was ordered to stand trial.

=== Competence to be executed ===
An inmate on death row has a right to be evaluated for competency by a psychologist to determine if punishment can be carried out. This is a result of Ford v. Wainwright, a case filed by a Florida inmate on death row who took his case to the United States Supreme Court, declaring he was not competent to be executed. The court ruled in his favor, stating that a forensic professional must make that competency evaluation and, if the inmate is found incompetent, must provide treatment to aid in his gaining competency so the execution can take place.

=== Competence to enter into a contract ===
Generally, in the United States, a person has the capacity or competence to make the decision to enter into a contract if he can understand and appreciate, to the extent relevant, all of the following:

- (a) The rights, duties, and responsibilities created by, or affected by the decision.
- (b) The probable consequences for the decisionmaker and, where appropriate, the persons affected by the decision.
- (c) The significant risks, benefits, and reasonable alternatives involved in the decision. See, e.g., California Probate Code §812.

=== Competence and Native Americans ===
Competency was used to determine whether individual Native Americans could use land allotted to them from the General Allotment Act (GAA), also known as the Dawes Act. The practice was used after 1906 with the passing of the Burke Act, also known as the forced patenting act. This Act further amended the GAA to give the Secretary of the Interior the power to issue allottees a patent in fee simple to people classified ‘competent and capable.’ The criteria for this determination is unclear but meant that allottees deemed ‘competent’ by the Secretary of the Interior would have their land taken out of trust status, subject to taxation, and could be sold by the allottee.

The Act of June 25, 1910 further amends the GAA to give the Secretary of the Interior the power to sell the land of deceased allottees or issue patent and fee to legal heirs. This decision is based on a determination made by the Secretary of Interior whether the legal heirs are ‘competent’ or ‘incompetent’ to manage their own affairs.

=== Competence and Immigrants ===
In the United States, legal proceedings in immigration court typically revolves around the removal of a non-citizen national due to his unlawful presence in the country. In these situations, non-citizens are placed in immigration court hearings where "immigration judges determine whether respondents should be ordered removed from the United States or granted relief or protection from removal... and permitted to remain in the country." Like in other court proceedings, competency can be raised by either parties or the judge if the non-citizen exhibits questionable capacity. In this particular setting, non-citizens are presumed to be competent as determined by Matter of M-A-M where they have "a rational and factual understanding of the nature and object of the proceedings, can consult with the attorney or representative if there is one, and has a reasonable opportunity to examine and present evidence and cross-examine witnesses." The language in Matter of M-A-M is similar and holds aspects to Dusky v. United States, but in the case that there is evidence of incompetency in the non-citizen, there are two instances where it differs. The first being that the court hearing may proceed regardless if the individual lacks "the competency to participate meaningfully in them" as long as there is the appropriate safeguards in place to ensure a fair trial. Secondly, because a non-citizen lacks the entitlements of a citizen, he is not entitled to counsel in removal proceedings.

=== Competence to Testify ===
In the United States, individuals who want to testify as a witness in a trial are generally found to be competent unless proven otherwise. However, questions of competency can be raised regarding any person who might issue a testimony (e.g., defendant, witnesses, experts) and can occur in both criminal and civil trials. Groups most likely to trigger a competency issue are children (especially under 10 years old), people with intellectual or developmental disabilities, people with mental illnesses, and people who have abused substances. Before 1975, certain populations (e.g., children) had to prove competency in order to testify, however this changed after the addition of Rule 601 in the Federal Rules of Evidence which states “every person is competent to be a witness, except as otherwise provided in these rules." This sets a standard that individuals cannot be excluded from testifying based merely on age, cognitive impairment, or mental illness. An individual may be deemed incompetent to testify as a witness if his testimony is found to be irrelevant or misleading, or if he cannot be truthful.

Witness competency is different from credibility. Competency refers to a witness' capacity to accurately relay the details of the event, but credibility refers to the likelihood of truthfulness in his testimony. While competency to testify is determined by the trial judge, the credibility (e.g., truthfulness) of that testimony is weighed by a jury. Historically, witness competency rules in most American states prohibited testimony by slaves and free blacks.

==== Criteria for Determining Competency ====
Competency to testify is decided by the judge and rarely requires formal evaluation because the threshold is low; judges often use their own discretion without expert input. Instead, judges use several basic criteria to decide if a witness has the capacity to testify: ability to observe, ability to remember, ability to communicate, and ability to remain truthful.

===== Ability to observe =====
Witnesses must have been able to observe the event to which they testify. This standard is usually met, unless the witness has visual or hearing impairments which make observing the event difficult (see Williams v. State (2010) where witness testimony was called into questions because of their visual impairment). Research with children and observational capacity has found that even though young children often struggle to understand and make meaning from the complex interactions they witness, it does not inhibit their ability to report what they observed.

===== Ability to remember =====
Research suggests that for witnesses, the two biggest problems that might interfere with their ability to remember the event are time and age. The more time that passes between the event and their recollection, the more difficult it will be for them to accurately recall the event. Also, young children are more susceptible to outside influences and have a more difficult time remembering the details of the events compared to older children.

===== Ability to communicate =====
This is related to a witness' ability to utilize language and organize the details of the event by time and space. This is more difficult for young children who do not have a mastery of the language and may have trouble recalling event details in order. For people who have physical or developmental disabilities, accommodations may be made based on the court's discretion. For example, in People v. Miller (1988), a speech therapist was permitted to translate for a victim with cerebral palsy who had difficulty testifying.

===== Ability to remain truthful =====
Witnesses must be able to distinguish between truth and lies and swear an oath to tell the truth in the courtroom. Most people, children included, understand that they must tell the truth on the witness stand, even though they might have different motivations for so doing. Even young children can distinguish truth and lies, and do not lie any more frequently than adults do.

=== Competence to make treatment decisions ===
In the United States, an individual must be deemed competent to provide informed consent for medical treatment. Incompetent individuals cannot provide informed consent, so other decision-makers (such as a guardian or health care proxy) may be identified in their stead. Competence to make treatment decisions stems from legal precedent about the right to refuse psychiatric medication and treatment. In the context of informed consent, most adults are assumed to be competent unless otherwise specified, but should they suffer from severe mental illnesses or intellectual disabilities, their competence may be questioned. Still, adults from these more vulnerable populations are not incompetent by default and their competence should be evaluated on a case-by-case basis. There are specific tools that a psychologist may use to evaluate competence to make treatment decisions, such as the MacArthur Competency Assessment Tool-Treatment.

If competence to make treatment decisions is questioned, the individual's understanding, appreciation, and decision-making process may be evaluated.

==== Understanding ====
A patient should be able to understand any relevant information about their treatment or medical condition which would be disclosed to them during informed consent. If a patient does not possess the ability to understand the information disclosed to them, they may not be competent to make treatment decisions. Some adults who may lack this ability to understand might be patients who suffer from amnesia, dementia, or those with intellectual disabilities.

==== Appreciation ====
A patient should then be able to not only understand information about their treatment or medical condition, but also appreciate how that information may apply to them. This aspect is more than understanding the information in the abstract; the patient should be able to appreciate the consequences of a) consenting to the treatment, b) investigating alternate treatment options, or c) refusing the treatment, and how they would be directly impacted. A patient who experiences delusions which are out of touch with reality may understand that antipsychotic medication is a traditional treatment for schizophrenia, but believe that in their case, they are not mentally ill and taking this medicine would make them catatonic. In this case, the patient lacks the ability to appreciate the consequences of their decisions.

==== Reasonable decision-making process ====
This aspect of competence is related to the cognition or thought-process underscoring the patient's decision. The patient must be able to rationally weigh the benefits and risks associated with their medical condition, consenting to treatment, assessing alternative treatments, and/or refusing treatment. An evaluator may question a patient's competence if some substantial consequence (e.g., limb amputation) is thought as less important than something relatively minor (e.g., hair loss). If the decision to refuse treatment appears to stem directly from mental illness, this may indicate a patient's decision-making process is not rational or reasonable.

=== Competence to waive right to counsel and self-represent ===
In the United States Constitution, the Sixth Amendment grants criminal defendants a right to counsel. However, some defendants want to waive this right and proceed pro se. In Faretta v. California, the Supreme Court determined that criminal defendants have a right to waive this Sixth Amendment right and represent themselves in criminal proceedings, even if it is disadvantageous to the criminal defendant to do so. In order to waive their right to counsel, a criminal defendant must be found competent to do so.

==== Competency standard ====
Faretta v. California specified that the competency to waive the right to counsel should not be determined based on the criminal defendant's understanding of legal jargon. Criminal defendants have a right to represent themselves even if they do not understand all legal jargon. In other words, a criminal defendant may be competent to represent him/herself even if they would do so poorly. Rather, the competency standard for the right to waive counsel is the same standard as competency to stand trial, a decision by the Supreme Court in Godinez v. Moran. As such, if a defendant is found competent to stand trial, they are also competent to waive their right to counsel. Therefore, competence to waive counsel is based on whether the criminal defendant does so knowingly, intelligently, and voluntarily. In order for the waiver to be knowing, the criminal defendant must understand the right that they are waiving. In order for the waiver to be intelligent, the criminal defendant should understand the disadvantages of waiving their right to counsel and representing themselves. In order for the waiver to be voluntary, there should be no presence of coercion, and a defendant should opt to waive their right due to their own free will.

When forensic evaluators determine if a defendant is competent to waive their right to counsel and self-represent, they also pay attention to the defendant's reasoning for waiving their right to counsel. To be found competent by a forensic evaluator, criminal defendants should have a rational reason for waiving their rights. Irrational reasons include defeatist attitudes, fantastic objectives, paranoid ideation, or irrational beliefs.

Despite the fact that a criminal defendant has a right to proceed pro se, if a criminal defendant is incompetent due to a severe mental illness, they will be required to accept counsel even if they do not want counsel, a ruling by the Supreme Court in Indiana v. Edwards.

==== Standby counsel ====
If a defendant is found competent to waive their right to counsel and proceeds pro se, a court may decide to appoint a standby counsel, a ruling by the Supreme Court in McKaskle v. Wiggins. Pro se defendants are not required to have a standby counsel nor are they granted the right to have a standby counsel. The decision to appoint a standby counsel is in the hands of the court.

=== Competence to consent to search or seizure ===
In order to obtain evidence in criminal cases, the ability for law enforcement to conduct searches and/or seizures can be implemented. The Fourth Amendment of the United States Constitution states, "The right of the people to be secure in their persons, houses, papers, and effects, against unreasonable searches and seizures, shall not be violated, and no Warrants shall issue, but upon probable cause, supported by Oath or affirmation, and particularly describing the place to be searched, and the persons or things to be seized."

A search is conducted when law enforcement personnel are looking for evidence that might be useful in a case. A seizure is when law enforcement personnel actually take items from a person or scene to further investigate their case.

Law enforcement can request to search a person or location if they are given consent by the person in question, and a search may be conducted without consent if permitted by a search warrant.

Voluntary consent is considered to be consent given that is free from coercion.

=== Competency case law ===
Adjudicative competence has been developed through a body of common law in the United States. The landmark cases are the following:

- Dusky v. United States (1960)
- Jackson v. Indiana (1972)
- Drope v. Missouri (1975)
- Faretta v. California (1975)
- Rogers v. Okin (1979)
- Ford v. Wainwright (1986)
- Godinez v. Moran (1993)
- Pate v. Robinson (1966)
- Estelle v. Smith (1981)
- McKaskle v. Wiggins (1984)
- Washington v. Harper (1990)
- Medina v. California (1992)
- Riggins v. Nevada (1992)
- Cooper v. Oklahoma (1996)
- Sell v. United States (2003)
- Indiana v. Edwards (2008)
- Matter of M-A-M (2011)

== United Kingdom ==
In the laws of England and Wales, Scotland, and Ireland, the term "fitness to plead" is used to designate a person as "unfit to plead". The concept is identical to "competence", although detailed law differs.

== See also ==
- Age of consent
- Age of majority
- Suitable age and discretion
- United States federal laws governing offenders with mental diseases or defects
- Competency evaluation
