= List of United States Supreme Court cases involving mental health =

The U.S. Supreme Court has issued numerous rulings regarding mental health and how society treats and regards the mentally ill. While some rulings applied very narrowly, perhaps to only one individual, other cases have had great influence over wide areas.

== Criminal competency ==
Year	Case	Ruling	Right
1960	Dusky v. United States	Affirming a criminal defendant's constitutional right to have a competency evaluation before proceeding to trial, and setting the standard for determination of such competence.	BOR, 14th
1966	Pate v. Robinson	A hearing about competency to stand trial is required under the due process clause of the Constitution of the United States.	BOR, 14th
1972	Jackson v. Indiana	Criminal defendants who have been found incompetent to stand trial are not permitted to be held indefinitely. There must be some possibility of becoming competent in a reasonable amount of time	BOR, 14th
1975	Drope v. Missouri	When deciding whether to evaluate a criminal defendant's competency, the court must consider any evidence suggestive of mental illness, even one factor alone in some circumstances. Therefore, the threshold for obtaining a competency evaluation is low. When the issue is raised, the motion should be granted. The defendant must not bear all the burden for raising the issue.	BOR, 14th
1985	Ake v. Oklahoma	Indigent criminal defendants have a right to a competency evaluation	BOR, 14th
1996	Cooper v. Oklahoma	The burden for proving incompetency is only preponderance; due process would be violated if the burden is required to be carried by clear and convincing evidence.	

== Death penalty ==
Year	Case	Ruling	Right
1976	Profitt v. Florida	Permitted comparison of mitigating and aggravating factors to decide death penalty decisions. See also Furman v. Georgia (1972), and Gregg v. Georgia (1976)	1st
1986	Ford v. Wainwright	Preventing the execution [capital punishment] of the insane, requiring an evaluation of competency and an evidentiary hearing	8th
1989	Penry v. Lynaugh	Executing persons with mental retardation is not a violation of the Eighth Amendment. (Overturned in Atkins v. Virginia (2002))	8th
1993	Godinez v. Moran	Competency to stand trial includes the abilities to plead guilty and to waive the right to counsel	1st
2002	Atkins v. Virginia	The execution of intellectually disabled defendants violates the Eighth Amendment's ban on cruel and unusual punishment.	8th
2005	Roper v. Simmons	In a ruling that followed Wainwright (in assessing the nature of cruel and unusual punishments), children may not be given the death penalty	8th, 14th
2010	Graham v. Florida	Likewise, children may not be given life sentences (without possibility of parole) for offenses that do not include murder	8th

== Insanity ==
Year	Case	Ruling	Right
1978	Lockett v. Ohio	Sentencing authorities must have the discretion to consider every possible mitigating factor, rather than being limited to a specific list of factors.	1st
2020	Kahler v. Kansas	The due process clause of the United States Constitution does not require states to adopt a definition of the insanity defense that turns on whether the defendant knew that his or her actions were morally wrong.	14th, 8th

== Testimony ==
Year	Case	Ruling	Right
1981	Estelle v. Smith	The same doctor who evaluated the criminal defendant for competency also testified at the penalty phase of the trial, which violated the defendant's right against self-incrimination.	5th, 6th

== Addictions ==
Year	Case	Ruling	Right
1962	Robinson v. California	A state cannot make a person's status as an addict a crime; only behaviors can be criminal.	1st
1968	Powell v. Texas	Similarly to Robinson v. California, a state may not criminalize the status of alcoholism itself; the state may only prohibit behaviors.	8th

== Right to treatment ==
Year	Case	Ruling	Right
1976	Estelle v. Gamble	Established that prisoners are entitled to a minimum level of treatment.	8th

== Right to refuse treatment ==
Year	Case	Ruling	Right
1978	Rennie v. Klein	An involuntarily committed, legally competent patient who refused medication had a right to professional medical review of the treating psychiatrist's decision. The Court left the decision-making process to medical professionals.	14th
1990	Washington v. Harper	Prisoners have only a very limited right to refuse psychotropic medications in prison. The needs of the institution take precedence over the prisoners' rights. However, there must be a formal institutional hearing, the prisoner must be found to be dangerous to himself or others, the prisoner must be diagnosed with a serious mental illness, and the mental health care professional must state that the medication prescribed is in the prisoner's best interest.	14th
1992	Riggins v. Nevada	In a ruling very similar to Harper, the Court found that the State may force administration of psychotropic medications to a pre-trial detainee, if it establishes a medical need for the drug, and a need for the detainee's safety and that of others. To the Harper requirements, they added "less restrictive alternative" language, which requires the State to document that there are no behavioral, environmental, or other measures available that will be equally effective.	6th, 14th

== Civil commitment ==
Year	Case	Ruling	Right
1972	Jackson v. Indiana	Due process requires that the nature and duration of commitment bear some reasonable relation to the purpose for which the individual is committed." Reasoning that if commitment is for treatment and betterment of individuals, it must be accompanied by adequate treatment, several lower courts recognized a due process right	14th
1979	Addington v. Texas	Raised the burden of proof requirement, in order to civilly commit a person, from preponderance, to clear and convincing. Also, permitted the courts to defer judgment regarding a person's need for commitment, to the doctor(s)	14th
1979	Parham v. J.R.	The Court ruled that minors may be civilly committed to mental health facilities without an adversary hearing; in essence, parents do have the right to commit their children.	14th
1982	Youngberg v. Romeo	Each individual has a due process protected interest in freedom from confinement and personal restraint; an interest in reducing the degree of confinement continues even for those individuals who are properly committed. freedom from undue physical restraint and from unsafe conditions of confinement	14th
1975	O'Connor v. Donaldson	A finding of mental illness alone is not sufficient grounds for confining a person against their will. They must be found to be a danger to others or incapable of surviving safely without institutional care.	14th
1993	Heller v. Doe	The Court found that intellectually disabled persons are not a 'suspect' class of persons (requiring the same level of protection as racial minorities); thus, governments are free to enact almost any legislation or rule to civilly commit them, and the courts will not intervene, short of illegal or ridiculous actions (called 'rational' scrutiny).	14th
2000	Seling v. Young	Washington State's Community Protection Act of 1990 authorizes the civil commitment of "sexually violent predators," or persons who suffer from a mental abnormality or personality disorder that makes them likely to engage in predatory acts of sexual violence. After his imprisonment for committing six rapes, Andre Brigham Young was scheduled to be released from prison in 1990. Prior to his release, the state successfully filed a petition to commit Young as a sexually violent predator. Ultimately, Young instituted a federal habeas action. The court determined that the Community Protection Act was civil and, therefore, it could not violate the double jeopardy and ex post facto guarantees. On appeal, the Court of Appeals reasoned that the case turned on whether the Act was punitive "as applied" to Young.	5th

== See also ==
- Capital punishment in the United States
- Participation of medical professionals in American executions
