= Frendak v. United States =

- Court: District of Columbia Court of Appeals
- Full case name: Paula J. Frendak v. United States
- Decided: October 24, 1979
- Citation: 408 A.2d 364 (D.C. 1979)

Court membership
- Judges sitting: John W. Kern III, George R. Gallagher, John M. Ferren

Case opinions
- Decision by: Ferren
- Concurrence: Gallagher

Keywords
- Insanity defense; Competency evaluation

Frendak v. United States, 408 A.2d 364 (D.C. 1979) is a landmark case in which District of Columbia Court of Appeals decided that a judge could not impose an insanity defense over the defendant's objections.

== Circumstances ==
Paula Frendak shot a coworker. After four competency hearings, the defendant was adjudicated competent, although in the opinion of several experts she was likely insane when she committed the crime. However, Frendak refused to use the insanity defense as she felt a hospital was worse than any prison. She attempted suicide, went on hunger strikes and refused medication to underscore her protests. However, she was forced by the court to plead insanity. Thus, in this case a competent defendant was not allowed to reject the use of the insanity defense.

== Decision ==
On appeal the decision was reversed. The judge may not impose the insanity defense upon an unwilling defendant if an intelligent defendant voluntarily wishes to forgo the defense. The court said that a defendant may feel hospital is worse than prison, that the term of incarceration may be longer, that the stigma and legal consequences of a criminal or an insanity defenses are different.

Using the U.S. Supreme Court decisions in North Carolina v. Alford and Faretta v. California, the court concluded that

... respect for a defendant's freedom as a person mandates that he or she be permitted to make fundamental decisions about the course of the proceedings.

The court listed several disadvantages to choosing the insanity defense, including:

1. an insanity acquittal may increase the period of confinement over a prison sentence
2. better treatment may be received in a prison than a mental hospital
3. the defendant may want to avoid the stigma associated with a mental disorder
4. commitment may result in loss of other rights, such as a driver's license
5. the defendant may regard the crime as a political or religious act

The court therefore limited any further competence inquiry to an evaluation of the defendant's specific competency to waive the insanity defense.

== Significance ==
This decision examines the quality of the defendant's decision. If the defendant appears to be intelligently and voluntarily waiving the insanity defense, the trial court should not deny this. However, the trial court should look into whether the defendant has been properly informed of the effects of their decision as well as the alternatives available to them. Thus the nature of such an evaluation would be similar to a competency to stand trial evaluation.

The Frendak rationale, that a judge may not impose an insanity defense over the objections of the defendant, has been used mostly in federal cases. Some states have endorsed less elaborate procedures. For example, if a judge rules that the waiver of the insanity defense is not voluntary and informed, yet nonetheless the defense is imposed over the defendant's objections, then a separate counsel must be appointed to argue issues pertaining to insanity issues, while the defendant's counsel presents the arguments the defendant desires.

However, as of 2002, seventeen jurisdictions permitted an insanity defense to be entered over the objections of the defendant. Thus these jurisdictions are, in effect, saying that a defendant who has been found competent to stand trial is not competent to rationally select his trial plea. Therefore a separate competency to refuse the insanity defense would have to be held that is similar to an evaluation of the defendant's mental state at the time of the offense.

Realistically, because of the Supreme Court's holding in Godinez v. Moran, it is most likely that the court would hold that if a defendant is competent to stand trial, then he is also competent to waive the insanity defense, as the two competencies are equivalent.

Godinez v. Moran was modified and refined by the Supreme Court decision in Indiana v. Edwards in 2008.

== See also ==
- List of criminal competencies
