= List of criminal competencies =

List of criminal competencies is a listing of the various types of competencies relevant to the defendant in criminal law in the United States. In the U.S., the law is permeated with competency issues, since a state may not subject an individual who is "incompetent" to trial on criminal charges. In insisting on this requirement, the law is acting on the premise that society recognizes only the actions of an autonomous individual. Below is a list of the most relevant competencies that must be evaluated (if a question of incompetency is raised) in order to proceed.

== Criminal Competencies ==
- Competency to Consent to a Search or Seizure - Fourth Amendment (Mapp v. Ohio, Katz v. United States, Florida v. Rodriguez)
- Competency to Stand Trial - (Dusky v. United States)
- Competency to Waive Right to Competency - (United States v. Morin)
- Competency to Confess - (Brown v. Mississippi, Miranda v. Arizona. Colorado v. Connelly)
- Competency to Plead Guilty - (Seiling v. Eyman, Godinez v. Moran)
- Competency to Waive the Right to Counsel - (Godinez v. Moran, McKaskle v. Wiggins, Faretta v. California)
- Competency to Refuse an Insanity Defense - (Frendak v. United States)
- Competency to Testify
  - Legal Requirements for Testimonial Competence - Federal Rules of Evidence, Rule 601
  - Assessment of Witness Credibility - Federal Rules of Evidence, Rule 508
- Competency to Be Sentenced and Executed - (Saddler v. United States)
  - Competency at the Sentencing Proceedings (Chavez v. United States)
  - Competency to Be Imprisoned or Executed - (Ford v. Wainwright, Penry v. Lynaugh, Panetti v. Quarterman )
- Competency to Refuse Treatment - (Perry v. Louisiana)

== See also ==
- Competency evaluation
- Adjudicative competence
