= Panetti v. Quarterman =

- Supreme Court of the United States

Argued April 18, 2007 Decided June 28, 2007
- Full case name: Scott Louis Panetti v. Nathaniel Quarterman, Director, Texas Department of Criminal Justice
- Docket no.: 06-6407
- Citations: 551 U.S. 930 (more) 127 S. Ct. 2842; 168 L. Ed. 2d 662

Case history
- Prior: Denial of habeas relief affirmed by the Fifth Circuit, 448 F.3d 815 (5th Cir. 2006); cert. granted, Jan. 5, 2007

Holding
- Criminal defendants sentenced to death may not be executed if they do not understand the reason for their imminent execution, and that once the state has set an execution date death-row inmates may litigate their competency to be executed in habeas corpus proceedings.

Court membership
- Chief Justice John Roberts Associate Justices John P. Stevens · Antonin Scalia; Anthony Kennedy · David Souter; Clarence Thomas · Ruth Bader Ginsburg; Stephen Breyer · Samuel Alito

Case opinions
- Majority: Kennedy, joined by Stevens, Souter, Ginsburg, Breyer
- Dissent: Thomas, joined by Roberts, Scalia, Alito

Laws applied
- U.S. Const. amend. VIII

Panetti v. Quarterman, 551 U.S. 930 (2007), is a decision by the Supreme Court of the United States, ruling that criminal defendants sentenced to death may not be executed if they do not understand the reason for their imminent execution, and that once the state has set an execution date death-row inmates may litigate their competency to be executed in habeas corpus proceedings. This decision reaffirmed the Court's prior holdings in Ford v. Wainwright, and Stewart v. Martinez-Villareal.

== Background ==
In September 1992, Scott Panetti shot and killed his mother-in-law Amanda Alvarado, 56 and his father-in-law, Joe Alvarado, 55 in Fredericksburg, Texas. The victims were the parents of his second wife, Sonja Alvarado. He then held his wife and daughter hostage for the night, and surrendered to police the next morning. Three years later, Panetti was tried in a Texas state court for capital murder. Panetti sought to represent himself, and so the trial court ordered a competency hearing. Panetti was found to be suffering from a "fragmented personality, delusions, and hallucinations" for which he had been hospitalized over 12 times and for which he had been prescribed high doses of powerful psychiatric drugs for schizophrenia. Panetti's ex-wife testified at the competency hearing and described one of Panetti's psychotic episodes in 1986. During that episode, Panetti had "become convinced the devil had possessed their home and, in an effort to cleanse their surroundings, Panetti had buried a number of valuables next to the house and engaged in other rituals." Even with this testimony, Panetti was found competent to be tried and to waive his right to counsel.

A veteran of the US Navy, Panetti's defense at trial was that he was not guilty by reason of insanity. Standby counsel related that Panetti's behavior was "scary", "bizarre", and "trance-like." It was evident to standby counsel, based on Panetti's behavior both in private and before the jury, that Panetti was not competent, and that his behavior made a farce and mockery of the judicial process. Panetti had also allegedly stopped taking his medication a few months before the trial. Indeed, two months after the end of the trial, the trial court found Panetti incompetent to waive his right to state habeas counsel. Nevertheless, Panetti was convicted of capital murder and sentenced to death.

Panetti sought appellate review in the Texas courts, as well as state habeas relief. All these efforts were fruitless. The U.S. Supreme Court twice declined to review Panetti's case. Panetti then filed a federal habeas petition, which was denied, and that denial was affirmed by the Fifth Circuit. The U.S. Supreme Court again declined to review the case.

Once these federal habeas proceedings had ended, the state trial judge, Steven Ables, set an execution date of February 5, 2004. At this point, Panetti claimed that he was incompetent to be executed. The Texas Court of Criminal Appeals denied Panetti's appeal, and Panetti filed another federal habeas petition. On February 4, 2004, the federal district court stayed Panetti's execution in order to allow the state courts to adjudicate Panetti's claim of mental incompetence. The state trial court, in turn, appointed two mental health experts to evaluate Panetti. Lawyers defending Panetti were given a one-week notice to also acquire mental health experts to also evaluate Panetti. Both of the experts for the state concluded that Panetti was malingering in order to avoid execution. Panetti responded by arguing that the trial court's procedures did not comply with the procedures set forth in Ford v. Wainwright. The state trial court responded by closing the case, ruling that Panetti did not show he was incompetent to be executed. He did not appeal to either the Texas Court of Criminal Appeals or the U.S. Supreme Court.

Instead, he returned to federal court, where another hearing was held. After the hearing the district court concluded that the state courts had not complied with the procedural requirements of Ford. Nevertheless, it denied relief because, under Fifth Circuit precedent, it was enough that Panetti know simply that he was about to be executed and the "factual predicate" for the execution. The Fifth Circuit affirmed the denial of Panetti's habeas petition, and on January 4, 2007, the U.S. Supreme Court agreed to review the case. The case was argued before the Supreme Court on April 17, 2007, with Texas Solicitor General Ted Cruz appearing for the state.

Panetti died on May 27, 2025 while on death row. According to the Texas Department of Criminal Justice the cause of death was acute respiratory failure.

== Opinion of the Court ==
On June 28, 2007, the last day of the term, the Supreme Court reversed and remanded by a vote of 5-4, with Justice Anthony Kennedy writing for the majority.

=== Jurisdiction ===
The Court began its opinion by considering its jurisdiction. Panetti had not raised his claim that he was not competent to be executed – what lawyers call a Ford claim – in his first federal habeas petition. The Court therefore lacked jurisdiction to entertain it unless he could overcome the bar on "second or successive" habeas petitions imposed by the Antiterrorism and Effective Death Penalty Act of 1996 (AEDPA). The term "second or successive" is a term of art; not every subsequent habeas petition is subject to AEDPA's bar on second or successive habeas petitions. The Court ruled that Panetti's petition was not barred as "second or successive" because his Ford claim did not become ripe until his execution was imminent. It rejected the State's contrary argument because of the perverse results it would have generated – inmates could be forced to litigate their competency to be executed before any signs of mental illness had set in. "An empty formality requiring prisoners to file unripe Ford claims neither respects the limited legal resources available to the States nor encourages the exhaustion of state remedies." Accordingly, Panetti's Ford claim was not barred by the second-or-successive rule, and the Court had jurisdiction to entertain Panetti's appeal.

=== Procedures for determining a Death Row inmate's competence to be executed ===
Under Ford, once a prisoner seeking a stay of execution makes a "substantial threshold showing of insanity", he must be afforded a fair hearing at which the question of his competence to be executed can be resolved. This means he must have an "opportunity to be heard" by an impartial decisionmaker. In other words, the legal determination of his competence to be executed cannot rest solely on the determination of experts, because doing so would prevent the inmate from offering evidence to rebut any expert's opinion that he was competent to be executed.

The Texas courts did not comply with these minimal procedures in Panetti's case. Panetti was entitled to the procedural protections of Ford because he had made the required threshold showing; indeed, if he had not done so, why had the state trial court appointed the mental health experts to evaluate him? The state courts refused to transcribe the proceedings, failed to keep Panetti's counsel apprised of the progress of Panetti's claim of incompetence, and arguably failed to hold the competency hearing required by Texas law. Most importantly, however, the Texas courts did not afford Panetti an opportunity to refute the opinions of the court-appointed experts. Although counsel had asked the trial court to give him money to hire experts of his own, the trial court ended the case without ruling on that request. These deficiencies in the procedures the Texas courts used to determine that Panetti was competent to be executed led the Court to conclude that Panetti did not receive the minimal process due him under Ford.

Under AEDPA's standard for granting relief on a federal constitutional claim, the state court's resolution of that claim must be contrary to, or involve an unreasonable application of, clearly established federal law, as determined by the Supreme Court. Ford supplied the clearly established law by which to evaluate the Texas courts' treatment of Panetti's claim. And even though the Ford standard is stated in general terms, it was clear to the Court that the procedures the Texas courts employed did not fit the bill. Because the Texas courts had unreasonably applied Ford when they adjudicated Panetti's claim of incompetence, the Court was free to determine what the proper procedure should have been, and whether Panetti was, in fact, not competent to be executed.

=== Substantive competency determinations under Ford ===
At an evidentiary hearing in the federal district court, four experts testified on Panetti's behalf. One expert opined that Panetti suffered from schizo-affective disorder, resulting in a genuine delusion regarding the reason for his execution. The expert stated that Panetti believed that his execution was part of "spiritual warfare" between the "demons and the forces of the darkness and God and the angels and the forces of light." Panetti understands that the State claims it is executing him for the murders, but believes that the State's reason is a sham and the real reason is that the State wants to stop Panetti from preaching. Panetti's other experts testified to similar conclusions.

The State's witnesses conceded that Panetti was mentally ill, although they resisted the conclusion that Panetti was not competent to be executed. They pointed to the fact that at times Panetti was "clear and lucid", and could understand "certain concepts". Panetti's experts reminded the court that schizophrenia does not diminish a person's cognitive abilities, such that during short interactions the patient may appear lucid. Over time, however, the patient's mental illness would become apparent. Based on this testimony, the Fifth Circuit had held that Panetti's delusions did not render him incompetent. But the Court held that the Fifth Circuit's interpretation of Ford had been "flawed".

For the Fifth Circuit, three of the district conclusions were sufficient to sustain the ruling that Panetti was competent. First, Panetti knew that he had committed the murders. Second, Panetti knew that he was about to be executed. And third, Panetti knew that the State's given reason for executing him was that he had committed the murders. These three facts allowed the Fifth Circuit to ignore the delusions that prevented Panetti from understanding that the reason for his execution was that he had committed the murders. In the Fifth Circuit's view, Ford required mere awareness of the State's reason rather than a rational understanding of it.

The Eighth Amendment forbids executing the insane because doing so offends human decency in that it serves neither the goal of retribution or deterrence. "The potential for a prisoner's recognition of the severity of the offense and the objective of community vindication are called into question, however, if the prisoner's mental state is so distorted by a mental illness that his awareness of the crime and punishment has little or no relation to the understanding of those concepts shared by the community as a whole." This is what the Court in Ford was referring to when it held that an inmate who lacks a rational understanding of the reason for his execution. A death-row inmate who is "so callous as to be unrepentant, so self-centered and devoid of compassion as to lack all sense of guilt, so adept at transferring blame to others as to be considered, at least in the colloquial sense, to be out of touch with reality" may still have a "rational understanding" of the reason for his execution. Panetti's claim was that, by virtue of his mental illness, his psychotic disorder, he lacked such a "rational understanding". Both the Texas courts' procedural missteps and the Fifth Circuit's substantive definition of incompetence precluded consideration of this contention.

== Dissenting opinion ==
Justice Clarence Thomas dissented from all three of the Court's legal conclusions – that Panetti's Ford claim was not second or successive, that the Texas courts did not afford Panetti the procedural protections required by Ford, and that the Fifth Circuit did not apply the correct substantive standard under Ford.

== See also ==
- List of United States Supreme Court cases, volume 551
- List of criminal competencies
- List of United States Supreme Court cases
