= Stewart v. Martinez-Villareal =

- Supreme Court of the United States

Argued February 25, 1998 Decided May 18, 1998
- Full case name: Terry Stewart, Director, Arizona Department of Correction, et al., Petitioners v. Ramon Martinez-Villareal
- Citations: 523 U.S. 637 (more) 118 S. Ct. 1618; 140 L. Ed. 2d 849; 1998 U.S. LEXIS 3104

Case history
- Prior: Certiorari to the United States Court of Appeals for the Ninth Circuit

Holding
- §2244(b) did not apply to a petition that raises only a competency to be executed claim and that respondent did not, therefore, need authorization to file his petition in the District Court.

Court membership
- Chief Justice William Rehnquist Associate Justices John P. Stevens · Sandra Day O'Connor; Antonin Scalia · Anthony Kennedy; David Souter · Clarence Thomas; Ruth Bader Ginsburg · Stephen Breyer

Case opinions
- Majority: Rehnquist, joined by Stevens, O'Connor, Kennedy, Souter, Ginsburg, Breyer
- Dissent: Scalia, joined by Thomas
- Dissent: Thomas, joined by Scalia

Stewart v. Martinez-Villareal, 523 U.S. 637 (1998), was a decision by the United States Supreme Court, which held that 28 U.S.C. § 2244(b) did not apply to a petition that raises only a competency to be executed claim and that respondent did not, therefore, need authorization to file his petition in the District Court.

== Factual Background ==
Martinez-Villareal (Respondent), filed a habeas corpus petition in federal court. Relying on Ford v. Wainwright, which held that the State may not execute an insane person, the Respondent alleged that he was incompetent to be executed.

The State moved to dismiss the Respondents petition as premature and the District Court agreed. Nevertheless, the court granted habeas corpus on other grounds. The District Court's grant was reversed on appeal, but warned that the Respondent's Ford claim could be brought again.

Fearing the passage of the Antiterrorism and Effective Death Penalty Act (AEDPA) might foreclose his Ford claim, Respondent asked the District Court to reopen his Ford claim. The District Court denied the Respondent's request, but assured that the Ford claim would not be foreclosed in future habeas corpus petitions.

Thereafter, the State obtained a warrant for execution of the Respondent. The Arizona Superior Court determined that the Respondent was fit to be executed. Respondent appealed the determination to the State Supreme Court, but the court declined to review the finding.

Respondent moved to reopen his Ford claim in Federal District Court, however, the court dismissed the claim for lack of jurisdiction according to AEDPA. Respondent appealed the dismissal to the Federal Ninth Circuit Court of Appeals. The Court of Appeals found that the claim was not barred and transferred it back to the District Court.

The Supreme Court granted certiorari.

== See also ==
- List of United States Supreme Court cases, volume 523
- List of United States Supreme Court cases
- Lists of United States Supreme Court cases by volume
- Ford v. Wainwright (1986)
- Panetti v. Quarterman (2007)
