= Cooper v. Oklahoma =

- Supreme Court of the United States

Argued January 17, 1996 Decided April 16, 1996
- Full case name: Bryon Keith Cooper, Petitioner v. Oklahoma
- Citations: 517 U.S. 348 (more) 116 S. Ct. 1373; 134 L. Ed. 2d 498; 1996 U.S. LEXIS 2649

Case history
- Prior: Jury verdict of guilty; affirmed, Cooper v. State, 1995 OK CR 2, 889 P.2d 293; cert. granted, 516 U.S. 910 (1995).
- Subsequent: None

Holding
- Oklahoma's procedural rule that allows the State to try a defendant who is more likely than not incompetent violates due process. Oklahoma Court of Criminal Appeals reversed and remanded for further proceedings.

Court membership
- Chief Justice William Rehnquist Associate Justices John P. Stevens · Sandra Day O'Connor; Antonin Scalia · Anthony Kennedy; David Souter · Clarence Thomas; Ruth Bader Ginsburg · Stephen Breyer

Case opinion
- Majority: Stevens, joined by unanimous

Laws applied
- U.S. Const. amend. XIV

Cooper v. Oklahoma, 517 U.S. 348 (1996), was a United States Supreme Court case in which the Court reversed an Oklahoma court decision holding that a defendant is presumed to be competent to stand trial unless he proves otherwise by the second highest legal standard of proof, that of clear and convincing evidence, ruling that to be unconstitutional. The court said the defendant's Fourteenth Amendment rights to due process were violated.

In this case, the defendant's ability to understand the charges against him and his ability to assist in his own defense was challenged on five occasions before and during his trial and sentencing for capital murder, but the trial judge ruled he was competent to stand trial because he did not meet Oklahoma's high standard of proof.

== Circumstances ==
Byron Keith Cooper was charged in 1989 with the murder of an 86-year-old man while in the course of committing burglary. Both before and during his trial, the question of his competency to stand trial was raised five times. The first time the question arose, the trial judge relied on the opinion of a state psychologist in determining to commit the defendant to a state psychiatric hospital for three months of treatment. Upon Cooper's return, the trial judge heard testimony from two state psychologists regarding Cooper's competence, but as these experts disagreed over whether Cooper was competent to stand trial, the judge decided to rule against Cooper and ordered the trial to proceed. After the pretrial hearing was completed, the defense attorney raised the issue of Cooper's competence a third time, telling the court that Cooper's behavior was "odd" and that he refused to communicate with his attorney. The attorney said that it could be a serious matter "if he's not faking". However, the judge declined to review his earlier decision that Cooper was competent to proceed.

On the first day of trial, Cooper's bizarre behavior (such as fleeing from his defense attorney, refusing to change his prison clothes because regular clothes "burned" him, and talking to himself while in the fetal position) induced the court to conduct a further competency hearing. This time the trial judge observed Cooper and heard testimony from people including lay witnesses, defendant Cooper, and a third psychologist who concluded that Cooper was incompetent. While expressing his uncertainty and not disagreeing with the psychologist, the judge ruled against Cooper and ordered the trial to proceed, finally opining:

I think it's going to take smarter people than me to make a decision here. I'm going to say that I don't believe he has carried the burden by clear and convincing evidence of his incompetency and I'm going to say we're going to go to trial.

The trial proceeded with Cooper continuing to act in a bizarre manner and refusing to be near his attorney. Cooper was convicted of first degree murder, and during the sentencing phase of the trial the history of Cooper's childhood abuse was recounted. Finally the defense attorney pleaded for either a mistrial or further evaluation into Cooper's competence, describing Cooper's courtroom behavior:

Without looking for his safety at all and looking what's behind him, when I moved the least bit [toward him] he fell to get away from me. He fell. He hit his head. The thud on that marble when he jackknifed backward off of that railing into that marble could be heard at the back of that courtroom. . . . he's just busted his head, tears are streaming down his eyes and he does not respond in any normal fashion.

The court summarily denied the motion. Cooper received the death penalty after the jury recommended death.

Cooper appealed, and the Oklahoma Court of Criminal Appeals affirmed both the conviction and the sentence. Cooper appealed to the Supreme Court on a writ of certiorari.

== Decision ==
In a unanimous verdict, the Supreme Court reversed the judgment and remanded the case back to the Oklahoma Court of Criminal Appeals for further consideration in light of their opinion. The Court held that the State may not proceed with a criminal trial when the defendant has demonstrated that he is more likely than not to be incompetent. Requiring a higher standard of proof, that of "clear and convincing evidence", was too high a standard of proof for a defendant to demonstrate a need for a competency evaluation, increasing the possibility of error to a level "incompatible with the dictates of due process". Criminal defendants must be allowed to avoid trial if they prove incompetence by a "preponderance of the evidence."

The court used the relevant history of common law regarding competency and the treatment of the insane and also compared Oklahoma's standards with the contemporary practices of other states, finding that only 4 of the 50 states used Oklahoma's heightened standard of proof. They concluded that this "demonstrates that the vast majority of jurisdictions remain persuaded that the heightened standard of proof imposed on the accused in Oklahoma is not necessary to vindicate the State's interest in prompt and orderly disposition of criminal cases." The court found most states uses a burden of proof far lower, or imposed no burden of proof at all, once the competency question is raised.

== Significance ==
The American Academy for Psychiatry and the Law unofficially considers this decision a landmark case in competency to stand trial case law. The court stated that no one questions the fundamental right of competency to stand trial. As established in Dusky v. United States, a defendant has a fundamental right not to be put to trial unless he has "sufficient present ability to consult with his lawyer with a reasonable degree of rational understanding . . . [and] a rational as well as factual understanding of the proceedings against him." A State may not proceed with a criminal trial after the defendant has demonstrated that he is more likely than not to be incompetent.

== See also ==
- List of United States Supreme Court cases, volume 517
- List of United States Supreme Court cases
- Lists of United States Supreme Court cases by volume
- List of United States Supreme Court cases by the Rehnquist Court
- Drope v. Missouri (1975)
- Ford v. Wainwright (1986)
