= Dusky v. United States =

- Supreme Court of the United States

Decided April 18, 1960
- Full case name: Milton Dusky v. United States
- Citations: 362 U.S. 402 (more) 80 S. Ct. 788; 4 L. Ed. 2d 824; 1960 U.S. LEXIS 1307

Case history
- Prior: 271 F.2d 385 (8th Cir. 1959)
- Subsequent: 295 F.2d 743 (8th Cir. 1961)

Holding
- The competency standard for standing trial: whether the defendant has "sufficient present ability to consult with his lawyer with a reasonable degree of rational understanding" and a "rational as well as factual understanding of the proceedings against him."

Court membership
- Chief Justice Earl Warren Associate Justices Hugo Black · Felix Frankfurter; William O. Douglas · Tom C. Clark; John M. Harlan II · William J. Brennan Jr. Charles E. Whittaker · Potter Stewart

Case opinion
- Per curiam

Dusky v. United States, 362 U.S. 402 (1960), was a landmark United States Supreme Court case in which the Court affirmed a defendant's right to have a competency evaluation before proceeding to trial. The Court outlined the basic standards for determining competency.

== Background ==
Milton Dusky, a 33-year-old man, was charged with assisting in the kidnapping and rape of an underage female. He clearly had schizophrenia but was found competent to stand trial and received a sentence of 45 years. On petition of writ of certiorari to the Supreme Court, the petitioner requested for his conviction to be reversed on the grounds that he was not competent to stand trial at the time of the proceeding.

== Decision ==
Upon reviewing the evidence, the court decided to grant the writ of certiorari. The court ruled that to be competent to stand trial the defendant must have a "sufficient present ability to consult with his lawyer with a reasonable degree of rational understanding" and a "rational as well as factual understanding of the proceedings against him." The court made clear that a brief mental status exam was insufficient. His case was remanded for retrial, at which time his sentence was reduced to 20 years.

== Significance ==
This case set the current standard for adjudicative competence in the United States. Although the statutes addressing competency vary from state to state in the United States, the two elements outlined in the decision are held in common:

- The defendant must understand the charges against them.
- The defendant must have the ability to aid their attorney in their own defense.

Subsequently, in Godinez v. Moran (1993), the Supreme Court held that the competency standard for pleading guilty or waiving the right to counsel is the same as the competency standard for standing trial established in Dusky. In Indiana v. Edwards (2008), however, the Supreme Court made a distinction between competence to waive counsel (CTWC), which was the subject of Godinez, and competence to represent oneself (CTRO). The majority opinion, authored by Breyer, noted, "In certain instances an individual may well be able to satisfy Dusky's mental competence standard, for he will be able to work with counsel at trial, yet at the same time he may be unable to carry out the basic tasks needed to present his own defense without the help of counsel." However, the court did not actually provide a CTRO standard, opting instead to leave this to legislatures and lower courts.

Felhous (2011) argues that many state statutes and the federal statute do not incorporate the rationality standard enunciated in Dusky, and that various post-Dusky court decisions had not consistently affirmed the rationality standard.

== See also ==
- List of criminal competencies
- List of United States Supreme Court cases, volume 362
- Faretta v. California, 422 U.S. 806 (1975)
- Ford v. Wainwright, 477 U.S. 399 (1986)
- United States v. Binion, 900 S.W.2d 702 (2005)
