= Kenneth Curtis =

Kenneth Curtis may refer to:

- Kenneth M. Curtis (born 1931), former American Governor, Ambassador, party chairman, and lawyer
- Kenneth L. Curtis (born 1965), initially found incompetent to stand trial for the killing of his girlfriend, found competent 10 years later
- Ken Curtis (1916–1991), American singer and actor
