= Indiana v. Edwards =

- Supreme Court of the United States

Argued March 26, 2008 Decided June 19, 2008
- Full case name: State of Indiana v. Ahmad Edwards
- Docket no.: 07-208
- Citations: 554 U.S. 164 (more) 128 S. Ct. 2379; 171 L. Ed. 2d 345

Case history
- Prior: Conviction reversed by the Indiana Supreme Court, 866 N.E.2d 252 (Ind. 2007)

Holding
- A criminal defendant who is competent to stand trial may nevertheless be found incompetent to represent himself at that trial.

Court membership
- Chief Justice John Roberts Associate Justices John P. Stevens · Antonin Scalia; Anthony Kennedy · David Souter; Clarence Thomas · Ruth Bader Ginsburg; Stephen Breyer · Samuel Alito

Case opinions
- Majority: Breyer, joined by Roberts, Stevens, Kennedy, Souter, Ginsburg, Alito
- Dissent: Scalia, joined by Thomas

Laws applied
- U.S. Const. amends. VI, XIV

Indiana v. Edwards, 554 U.S. 164 (2008), was a United States Supreme Court case in which the Court held that the standard for competency to stand trial was not linked to the standard for competency to represent oneself.

== Background ==
=== Prior jurisprudence ===
The Court had recognized these two rights on competency for some time. In Dusky v. United States, 362 U.S. 402 (1960), and in Drope v. Missouri, 420 U.S. 162 (1975), the Court established the standard for competency to stand trial—the defendant must have a "rational and factual understanding" of the nature of the proceedings, and must be able to rationally assist his lawyer in defending him. In Faretta v. California, 422 U.S. 806 (1975), the Court held that a criminal defendant cannot be forced to have a lawyer if he does not wish it, but that before the defendant relinquishes his right to counsel the trial judge must ensure that the defendant understands the "dangers and disadvantages" of representing himself. With the decision in Godinez v. Moran, 509 U.S. 389 (1993), the Court held that a defendant may plead guilty (and thereby waive both his right to counsel and his right to represent himself) if he is competent to stand trial. Until Edwards, however, it remained an open question whether a criminal defendant could be simultaneously competent to stand trial and yet not competent to represent himself. The Court answered that question in the affirmative. The logic is that representing oneself at trial is more complicated than deciding what to plead.

=== Edwards' trial ===
Ahmad Edwards, who has schizophrenia, tried to steal a pair of shoes from a department store in Indiana. Store detectives caught him in the act, and he drew a gun, fired at a store security officer, and wounded an innocent bystander. He was charged with attempted murder, battery with a deadly weapon, criminal recklessness, and theft.

In 2000, he was deemed not competent to stand trial, and ordered to the state hospital for treatment. After seven months of treatment, he was restored to competency. Yet in 2002, his lawyers asked for another competency evaluation. That second competency evaluation resulted in a determination that Edwards was indeed competent to stand trial, although he still suffered from a mental illness. As trial preparations proceeded, his lawyers asked for a third competency evaluation, and in 2003 Edwards was again found not competent to stand trial and again committed to the state hospital. Eight months later, Edwards was again restored to competence, and trial preparations began again.

In June 2005, as trial began, Edwards asked to represent himself and asked for a continuance in the trial. The judge denied the request for a continuance, and Edwards therefore proceeded to trial with counsel. He was convicted of criminal recklessness and theft, but the jury could not reach a verdict as to the attempted murder and battery charges. Before the second trial on the attempted murder and battery charges, Edwards again asked to represent himself. The judge denied that request, pointing to the lengthy record of Edwards's mental illness. Edwards proceeded to trial with appointed counsel, and was convicted of the attempted murder and battery charges.

=== Appeals ===
Edwards appealed to the Indiana Court of Appeals, arguing that his right to represent himself at trial was violated. The court agreed with Edwards and ordered a new trial. The State then appealed to the Indiana Supreme Court, which also agreed with Edwards. It reasoned that Faretta and Moran required the state to allow Edwards to represent himself at trial. The State of Indiana asked the U.S. Supreme Court to review the decision, and it agreed to do so.

== Opinion of the Court ==
As Justice Breyer noted in his majority opinion for the Court, the Court's competency and self-representation cases "frame the question presented, but they do not answer it." A defendant who has a rational and factual understanding of the proceedings and who can rationally assist trial counsel is competent to stand trial. And a defendant who voluntarily and intelligently elects to stand trial without counsel—something he can only do if he is competent to stand trial to begin with—may do so. Even so, the right of self-representation is not absolute, and standby counsel may be appointed to assist the pro se defendant in matters of procedure and courtroom decorum. The Court came closest to answering the question presented by this case when it held that the standard for competency to stand trial and competency to plead guilty are the same, because the decision not to stand trial is "no more complicated than the sum total of decisions that a [represented] defendant may be called upon to make during the course of a trial." The crucial difference in Edwards, was that the pro se defendant was asking to proceed to trial without counsel. The difference, in other words, is the difference between the ability to end trial proceedings on one's own and the ability to conduct trial proceedings on one's own.

The Court ultimately concluded that, in light of these rules, a state may require an otherwise competent criminal defendant to proceed to trial with the assistance of counsel. The standard for competency to stand trial presumes that the defendant will have a lawyer to assist him at that trial. Implicit therefore in the Dusky rule is the idea that the standard for competency to stand trial must be lower than the standard for competency to represent oneself. The right to represent oneself at trial is qualified by the trial court's interest in preserving courtroom decorum and promoting the orderly presentation of evidence, questioning of witnesses, and advancement of legal argument. For the Court, it was "common sense" that a defendant's mental illness might impair his ability to accomplish these tasks—tasks that any lawyer must if he is to press his client's case effectively. "A right of self-representation at trial will not affirm the dignity of a defendant who lacks the mental capacity to conduct his defense without the assistance of counsel."

Moreover, the Court separated the standards for competency to stand trial and for competency to represent oneself out of a concern for the fairness of the trial process. Criminal trials "must not only be fair, they must appear fair to all who observe them." "No trial can be fair that leaves the defense to a man who is insane, unaided by counsel, and who by reason of his mental condition stands hopeless and alone before the court." For these reasons, the Constitution allows trial courts to "take realistic account of the particular defendant's mental capacities by asking whether a defendant who seeks to conduct his own defense at trial is mentally competent to do so."

=== Dissenting opinion ===
Characterizing the right of self-representation as "a specific right long understood as essential to a fair trial," Justice Scalia disputed the Court's conclusion that "a State may... strip a mentally ill defendant of the right to represent himself when that would be fairer." Because counsel's role under the Sixth Amendment is merely one of "assistance," or because the "right of self-representation could also be seen as a part of the traditional meaning of the Due Process Clause," Faretta had held that a state may not force a lawyer upon a defendant who does not want one. Faretta required the trial judge to inform Edwards about the dangers and disadvantages of representing himself, and Scalia believed that Edwards had taken that warning to heart. For Scalia, ultimately the right of self-representation rests on the right to present one's own case to the jury, however foolhardy an endeavor that might be.

Scalia also rejected the "dignity" premise that supported the Court's decision. "While there is little doubt that preserving individual dignity (to which the Court refers) is paramount," he wrote, "there is equally little doubt that the loss of dignity the right [of self-representation] is designed to prevent is not the defendant's making a fool of himself by presenting an amateurish or even incoherent defense. Rather, the dignity at issue is the supreme human dignity of being master of one's fate rather than a ward of the State—the dignity of individual choice." Godinez had found that the competency standard for pleading guilty or waiving one's right to counsel was the same as the standard for standing trial; therefore in Scalia's view if Edwards had the right to waive his defense completely he surely had the lesser right to mount a (presumably inferior) pro se defense.

Finally, consistent with his originalist theory, Scalia sought to quell doubts regarding the authenticity of the right of self-representation. "The right is not explicitly set forth in the text of the Sixth Amendment, and some Members of this Court [including Justice Breyer] have expressed skepticism about Faretta's holding." But, Scalia pointed out, the Sixth Amendment gave the defendant personally, and not his lawyer, the right to call witnesses on his behalf, the right to confront the prosecution's witnesses against him, and to have counsel assist him (assuming he so wishes). If the defendant is bound by counsel's decisions not to call certain witnesses or not to cross-examine others, he must have the right to represent himself in order to give substance to those other rights the Sixth Amendment protects. "Otherwise, the defense presented is not the defense guaranteed him by the Constitution, for in a very real sense, it is not his defense."

== Implications ==
Alan R. Felthous notes that an implication of this decision is that after a defendant has been found competent to stand trial, if he then wishes to represent himself, a separate evaluation may be required to determine whether he meets the higher standard of competency required to be his own lawyer, unless the earlier evaluation already assessed both competencies. Since the Supreme Court did not establish a specific standard for competence to represent oneself, this task has been left to the legislatures and lower courts.

== See also ==
- List of United States Supreme Court cases, volume 554
- List of United States Supreme Court cases
