= Competency evaluation (law) =

Means used to determine if a criminal defendant is competent to stand trial

In the United States criminal justice system, a competency evaluation is an assessment of the ability of a defendant to understand and rationally participate in a court process. Other legal systems, such as those in Canada, the United Kingdom, and Australia, have similar procedures for assessing fitness to stand trial, although definitions and legal thresholds may vary.

Competency was originally established by the Supreme Court of the United States as the evaluation of a defendant's competence to proceed to trial. In a subsequent ruling, the Court held that any prisoner facing the death penalty must be evaluated as competent to be executed, meaning that he must be capable of understanding why he has received the death penalty and the effect that the penalty will have. In further rulings, competence was also enlarged to include evaluation of the defendant's competence to plead guilty and competence to waive the right to counsel.

The American Bar Association's Criminal Justice Mental Health Standards stated in 1994 that the issue of a defendant's current mental incompetence is the single most important issue in the criminal mental health field, noting that an estimated 24,000 to 60,000 forensic evaluations of a criminal defendant's competency to stand trial were performed every year in the United States. A 1973 estimate put the number of competence evaluations at 25,000 to 36,000 each year. There are indications that the number of evaluations of criminal defendants is rising. One comparison of estimates between 1983 and 2004 suggest the annual number rose from 50,000 to 60,000 criminal competency evaluations respectively.

== History ==
The standard for competency evaluation applied in US courts is based on the Supreme Court decision Dusky v. United States in which the Court affirmed a defendant's right to have a competency evaluation before proceeding to trial. Competence to stand trial was defined by the court as the defendant's ability to consult rationally with an attorney to aid in his own defense and to have a rational and factual understanding of the charges. Dusky presented a petition of writ of certiorari to the Supreme Court requesting that his conviction be reversed on the grounds that he was not competent to stand trial at the time of the proceeding. The court decided to grant the writ, based on a lack of recent evidence that the petitioner was competent at the time of the trial. The case was remanded to the district court for a new hearing to evaluate Dusky's competence to stand trial, and for a new trial if he was found competent.

The case set the current standard for adjudicative competency in the United States. In Godinez v. Moran (1993) the Supreme Court enforced the Dusky standard as the Federal Standard for competence to stand trial. Although the statutes addressing competency vary from state to state in the United States, the two elements outlined in the Dusky v. United States decision are held in common as the minimum federal requirement to be deemed competent. The defendant must understand the charges and have the ability to aid his attorney in his own defense.

== Forms ==
Within the US criminal justice system, competence may be raised as an issue before trial, before a guilty plea, or in relation to whether a person convicted of a capital offense may be executed.

=== Competence to stand trial ===
A defendant is deemed competent to stand trial if they are found to have a sufficient present ability to understand and participate in legal proceedings. Every year an estimated 60,000 to 90,000 felony defendants undergo competency to stand trial (CST) evaluations, representing roughly 2-5% of all felony defendants, according to recent forensic psychology studies. Of those evaluated, only around 11-30% are deemed incompetent. Competency to stand trial depends only on the defendants current mental state and is entirely separate from their mental state at the time of the crime. CST does not necessarily certify that a defendant is of sound mental state, only that they are capable of understanding what is happening. Even severe mental disorders such as psychosis and amnesia do not automatically make a defendant incompetent. Studies found that about 2/3 of defendants suffering from severe mental disorders were found competent.

=== Competence to be executed ===
In determining competence to be executed, the Supreme Court of the United States relied on the argument that execution's purpose is to provide retribution to the aggrieved party and to act as a deterrent against similar acts. Using this foundation, the court found that there are some people for whom execution is not appropriate and would not be able to serve either its retributive or deterrent purposes. There are three ways in which one can be considered incompetent for execution: being deemed insane, having an intellectual disability, or have committed the crime subject to capital punishment while a minor.

The Supreme Court of the United States in Ford v. Wainwright (1986) determined that the Eighth Amendment protects people deemed insane from being executed because execution of an insane individual would be a cruel and unusual punishment. In this decision, Justice Powell more clearly stated that to be considered sane, and therefore fit to be executed, a person must firstly be aware that they are about to be executed and secondly know why they are being executed. This requirement was extended by the Supreme Court's Panetti v. Quarterman (2007) decision, to include that a person needs to rationally understand why they are being executed. To rationally understand the reason for execution, a death row inmate must believe that they are being executed because of the crime they are charged with. In the Panetti v. Quarterman case, Scott Louis Panetti had schizophrenia and was under the delusional belief that he was being executed due to religious persecution rather than because he committed murder. While he may have understood that he was to receive capital punishment due to his murder conviction, his extreme delusions prevented him from rationally understanding why he was to be executed.

The court ruled that a forensic professional must make the competence evaluation and, if the inmate is found incompetent, provide treatment to aid in the inmate gaining competency in order that the execution can take place. Providing treatment to an individual to enable that person to become competent to be executed places mental health professionals in an ethical dilemma. Some medical organizations, such as the American Medical Association and National Medical Association, argue that physicians have an ethical obligation to treat all patients, regardless of legal status. However, others contend that restoring a person's mental health solely to enable execution creates a moral conflict. Others feel that it is unethical to treat a person in order to execute them. Most restorations of competency are accomplished through psychiatric medication.

The Supreme Court of the United States in the Atkins v. Virginia (2002) case used the Eighth Amendment’s cruel and unusual punishment clause to determine that those with intellectual disabilities are not competent to be executed due to diminished culpability. Otherwise put, those with intellectual disabilities are exempt from execution because they are insufficiently responsible for their crimes. The Supreme Court of the United States in Roper v. Simmons (2005) decided that it was unconstitutional to execute individuals for crimes committed under the age of majority using the same reasoning in Atkins v. Virginia (2002).

=== Competence to plead guilty ===
It has been estimated that approximately 90 percent of all criminal cases in the United States are settled through guilty pleas, rather than a trial.

In Godinez v. Moran, 1993, the Supreme Court held that the competency standard for pleading guilty or waiving the right to counsel is the same as the competency standard for proceeding to trial as established in Dusky v. United States. A higher standard of competency is not required.

== Legal issues ==
Although Dusky v. United States affirmed the right to a competency evaluation, the specifics of the evaluation remain ambiguous. Each evaluator must decide what is meant by "sufficient present ability" and "has a rational as well as a factual understanding" as set forth in the Dusky decision. One common principle is clear in forensic evaluations, however. Forensic evaluators cannot reach a finding independent of the facts of the case at hand.

=== Presumption of competence ===
Later cases including Cooper v. Oklahoma (1996) and Medina v. California (1992) established a presumption of competency. Much like a presumption of innocence, a defendant is presumed competent to stand trial unless it is proven otherwise. Unlike a presumption of innocence, where the defendant must be proven guilty beyond a reasonable doubt, CST is determined only by a preponderance of the evidence. The defense must only prove that the defendant is more likely than not incompetent. In other words, the judge must only be convinced that more than 50% of the evidence indicates the defendant is incompetent.

=== Feigning incompetence ===
In United States v. Binion malingering or feigning illness during a competency evaluation was held to be obstruction of justice and led to an increased sentence.

=== Waiver of challenge to competency ===
Where a defendant does not raise the issue of mental competence before trial, the issue of competence may be deemed waived in the event of a conviction and appeal. For example, in United States v. Morin the United States Court of Appeals, Eighth Circuit upheld the defendant's conviction. The court rejected Mr. Morin’s argument, among others, that the district court violated his due process rights by refusing to allow him to waive competency at trial. The court held that since his competency to stand trial was never challenged, the issue of whether he was entitled to waive competency to stand trial was properly not considered.

=== Restoration of competence ===
A defendant who has been deemed incompetent to stand trial may be required to undergo mental health treatment, including court-ordered hospitalization and the administration of treatment against the defendant's wishes, in an effort to render the defendant competent to stand trial. A majority of defendants who are initially deemed incompetent are eventually restored to competency. Various studies report 60% to 90% of defendants have their competency restored.

== Methods of evaluation ==
Competency to stand trial is generally determined via a pretrial evaluation of the defendant's overall mental status and mental state at the time of the examination. While CST is typically raised as a pretrial matter, a CST evaluation may be requested by the judge or either attorney at any point if a bona fide doubt is raised. While a judge has the power to overrule the conclusion of a competency test, this power is rarely exercised. Judges agree with evaluator conclusions over 80% of the time. In some states they agree up to 99% of the time. Generally, the decision of whether a defendant is competent is left to psychological evaluators.

Who is deemed qualified to conduct a competency evaluation varies from state to state. Evaluators are typically psychiatrists, clinical psychologists, or social workers. While there are several widely used tests for CST, there is no one standardized examination.

While not formally part of the Dusky standard, evaluators commonly consider the defendant's ability to perform the following 10 trial related tasks when deciding competency:

1. understand their current legal situation
2. understand the charges against them
3. understand the pleas available
4. understand the possible penalties if they are convicted
5. understand the roles of the judge, defense counsel, and prosecutor
6. trust and communicate with defense counsel
7. help locate witnesses
8. aid in developing a strategy for cross-examining witnesses
9. act appropriately during the trial
10. make appropriate decisions about trial strategy

=== MMPI-2 ===
One widely used test for competency is the Minnesota Multi-phasic Personality Inventory 2nd Edition (MMPI-2). The MMPI-2 uses 567 true-false questions to determine a defendant’s levels of psychopathology. While the MMPI-2 effectively identifies general psychopathology and malingering, it has been criticized for insufficient specificity to legal competencies, such as understanding courtroom rules or trial procedure-key elements in CST determination.

=== Harvard Laboratory Competency Screening Test ===
The Competency Screening Test was developed by researchers at the Harvard Laboratory of Community Psychiatry in 1971. The test uses 22 fill in the blank style questions such as "If the jury finds me guilty, I will _______." Each answer is given a score of 0 (incompetent), 1 (uncertain competence), or 2 (competent). This test revolves around key elements of legal understanding. However, it elicits more extensive and varied responses than the yes or no format of the MMPI-2. Critics of the Competency Screening test argue that this makes it more difficult for evaluators to objectively score and harder test to teach evaluators how to conduct.

== Notable cases ==
In 1989, Kenneth Curtis of Stratford, Connecticut was initially found mentally incompetent to stand trial following the murder of his estranged girlfriend. But years later, as he had attended college and received good grades, this ruling was reversed, and he was ordered to stand trial.

Indiana v. Edwards (2008)- The Supreme Court ruled that states may insist upon representation by counsel for defendants who, although competent to stand trial, suffer from severe mental illness to the point where they are not competent to conduct trial proceedings by themselves.

Some other notable cases include:

- Frendak v. United States
- Estelle v. Smith

== See also ==
- List of criminal competencies

== Footnotes ==
- Zapf, Patricia A.; Roesch, Ronald; Pirelli, Gianni (2013-12-16). "Assessing Competency to Stand Trial". The Handbook of Forensic Psychology. pp. 279–314. doi:10.1002/9781394260591.ch11. ISBN 978-1-394-26059-1.
