= Christian Worley =

American civil rights activist

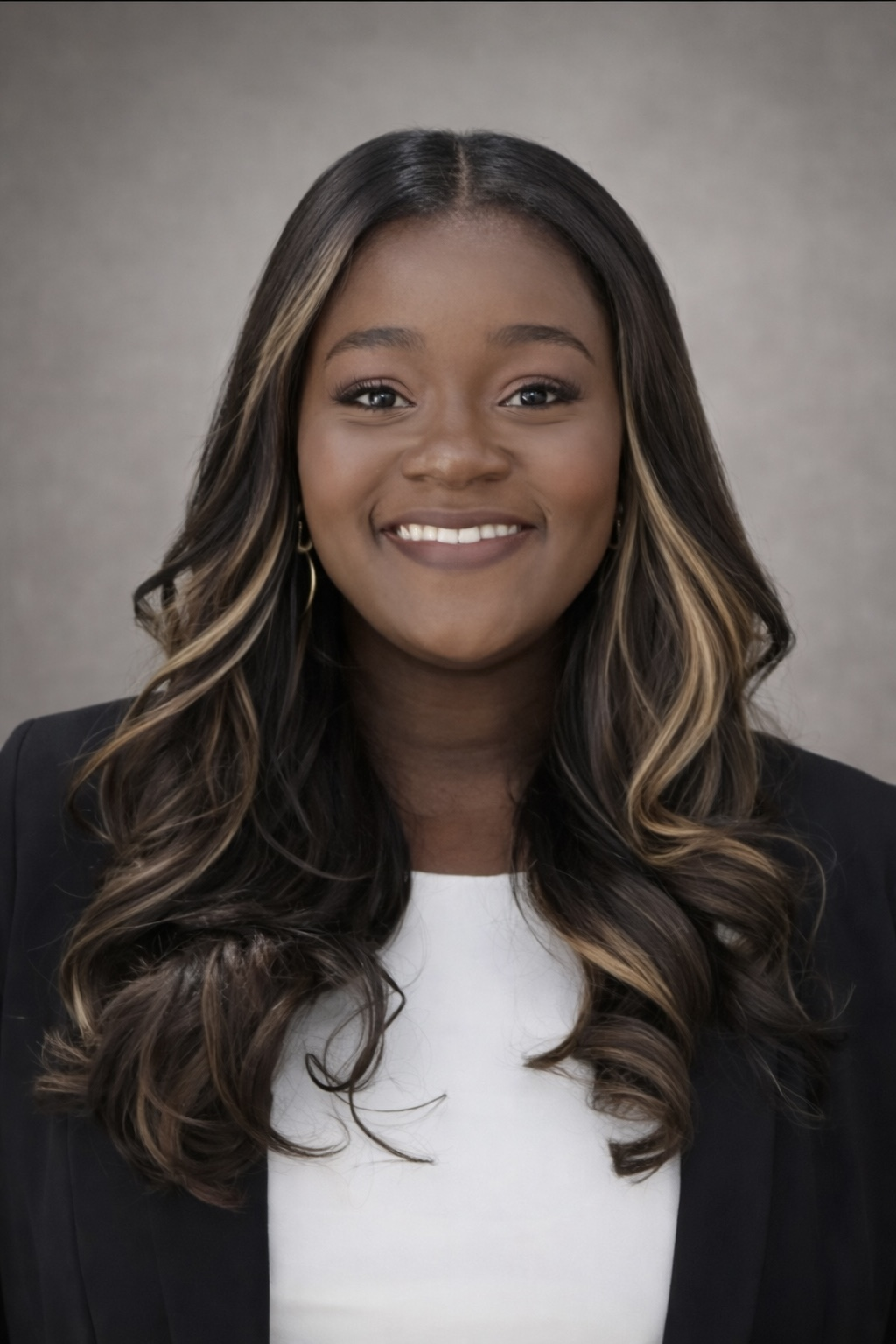
- Worley in 2025
- Born: 1998 (age 27–28); Atlanta, Georgia, U.S.
- Other name: Cece Worley
- Education: University of North Carolina at Wilmington (BA) North Carolina Central University (MPA)
- Occupation: Lawyer

Christian "Cece" Worley (born 1998) is an American civil rights activist and law student known for serving as the plaintiff in the federal lawsuit Proffitt v. North Carolina Department of Public Safety. Representing herself pro se, a federal court in North Carolina recognized endometriosis as a disability under the Americans with Disabilities Act (ADA) for the first time.

== Early life and education ==
Worley was born just outside of Atlanta, Georgia, and raised in Fayetteville, North Carolina. Worley attended the University of North Carolina Wilmington, where she graduated in 2020 with a Bachelor of Arts in Criminology and a minor in Sociology. She graduated during the COVID-19 pandemic.

== Career ==
=== Early career ===
In the summer of 2020, Worley founded Economic Justice for African Americans, a grassroots social media community dedicated to advancing economic justice and educating the public on civil rights and economic inequality. In 2021, Worley gained media attention for her extensive, independent genealogical research, where she traced her lineage to her enslaved family on a plantation in Columbus County, North Carolina. She successfully contacted a descendant of her ancestors' slave owners, and the two met to walk the plantation land together.

Shortly after earning her undergraduate degree, Worley began her professional career as a Juvenile Court Counselor Trainee for the North Carolina Department of Public Safety (NCDPS) in late 2020. She graduated valedictorian of the Juvenile Justice Basic Training program, receiving department-wide recognition from the Deputy Secretary of NCDPS. Following her loss of employment at NCDPS, Worley became homeless.

=== Endometriosis ADA lawsuit ===
In May 2022, following a hospitalization related to her endometriosis, Worley requested a reasonable accommodation under the ADA from NCDPS to telework one day per month. Worley suffered from endometriosis from the age of 12. Her condition caused debilitating symptoms, including severe pain and vomiting, which often left her bedridden. According to court filings, her supervisors denied her accommodation request, with one manager stating in an internal email that he would have to do the same for every woman in the office if he accommodated her. Worley alleged she was threatened with termination if she raised the issue again and was discouraged from using her accrued leave. She resigned on May 12, 2022, in what she characterized as a constructive discharge.

After being turned away by multiple lawyers who stated that the law regarding endometriosis and the ADA was underdeveloped, Worley filed a federal lawsuit pro se in June 2023. As a self-represented plaintiff, she achieved several rare procedural victories, including defeating a motion to dismiss, winning discovery battles, and eliciting admissions from agency witnesses during depositions.

On July 18, 2025, Magistrate Judge Robert T. Numbers II issued a ruling finding that Worley's endometriosis symptoms were severe enough to qualify as an ADA disability and that her request for limited telework could be reasonable. This ruling, the first of its kind in North Carolina, was adopted in full by District Judge Terrence Boyle on September 30, 2025. The case reached a settlement on December 19, 2025. It included monetary terms for Worley, reported to be a near six-figure amount, and a commitment by the NCDPS to implement department-wide ADA training for all management personnel.

=== Later education ===
In May 2024, Worley obtained her Master of Public Administration at North Carolina Central University, graduating summa cum laude. Worley was named one of ten recipients of the NAACP Legal Defense Fund's Marshall-Motley Scholarship, which provides a full-ride scholarship to law school for students who commit to practicing civil rights law in the South for eight years. As of 2026, Worley is a second-year Juris Doctor candidate at Georgetown University Law Center.

== Personal life ==
Worley married at the age of 19. After Worley lost employment at NCDPS, she became homeless and was divorced.
