= McKaskle v. Wiggins =

- Supreme Court of the United States

Argued November 9, 1983 Decided January 24, 1984
- Full case name: McKaskle, Acting Director, Texas Department of Corrections v. Carl Edwin Wiggins
- Citations: 465 U.S. 168 (more) 104 S.Ct. 944; 79 L. Ed. 2d 122; 1984 U.S. LEXIS 24

Case history
- Prior: Certiorari to the United States Court of Appeals for the Fifth Circuit

Holding
- Respondent's Sixth Amendment right to self-representation was not violated by the presence of a court-appointed standby counsel.

Court membership
- Chief Justice Warren E. Burger Associate Justices William J. Brennan Jr. · Byron White; Thurgood Marshall · Harry Blackmun; Lewis F. Powell Jr. · William Rehnquist; John P. Stevens · Sandra Day O'Connor

Case opinions
- Majority: O'Connor, joined by Burger, Powell, Rehnquist, Blackmun, Stevens
- Concurrence: Blackmun (in result)
- Dissent: White, joined by Brennan, Marshall

Laws applied
- U.S. Const. amend. VI

McKaskle v. Wiggins, 465 U.S. 168 (1984), is a United States Supreme Court case in which the court considered the role of standby counsel in a criminal trial where the defendant conducted his own defense (pro se). In this case the defendant claimed his Sixth Amendment right to present his own case in a criminal trial was violated by the presence of a court-appointed standby counsel.

== Circumstances ==
Carl Edwin Wiggins was on trial for robbery and chose to proceed pro se and was convicted and sentenced to life imprisonment. The conviction was overturned on the technicality, that the indictment was defective and Wiggins requested counsel for the second trial. The trial court appointed standby counsel to assist him if requested. Wiggins decided to defend himself and asked that the standby counsel be barred from interfering. Multiple times, both before and during the trial, Wiggins changed his mind regarding the standby counsel's role. Wiggins sometimes allowed or even requested standby counsels' participation. He was once again convicted. After his conviction, Wiggins moved for a new trial on the grounds that his standby counsel had interfered with his presentation of his own defense. This motion was denied by the trial court.

== Appeals ==
After Wiggins had exhausted both direct appeals and habeas corpus in state court, he filed a habeas petition in Federal District Court. He claimed that standby counsel's conduct deprived him of his constitutional right to conduct his own defense as guaranteed in Faretta v. California (1975). The federal court agreed that counsel should not interfere without permission but found that Wiggins' attorneys had not interfered and the appeal was dismissed. He then appealed to the Fifth Circuit which reversed, holding that Wiggins' Sixth Amendment right to represent himself was violated by the intrusive participation of the court-appointed standby counsel.

== Decision ==
In a split 6–3 decision, the Supreme Court found that Wiggins' right to present his own defense was not violated, since "it appears that he was allowed to make his own appearances as he saw fit and that his standby counsel's unsolicited involvement was held within reasonable limits." Judge Sandra Day O'Connor delivered the opinion of the Court, in which Chief Justice Burger, Powell, Rehnquist, and Stevens joined. Blackmun concurred in the result without writing a separate opinion. White filed a dissenting opinion, in which Brennan and Marshall joined.

The decision was based on federal and state laws preserving a defendant's right to self-representation as guaranteed in Faretta. Self-representation includes certain specific rights for a defendant to have his opinion heard. "The pro se defendant must be allowed to control the organization and content of his own defense, to make motions, to argue points of law, to participate in voir dire, to question witnesses, and to address the court and the jury at appropriate points in the trial. The record reveals that Wiggins was in fact accorded all of these rights."

== Significance ==
This case set a precedent for the boundaries on the behavior of standby counsel by refining the position taken in Faretta v. California regarding standby counsels' role.

== See also ==
- List of United States Supreme Court cases, volume 465
