= Right to counsel =

Legal right to have a lawyer

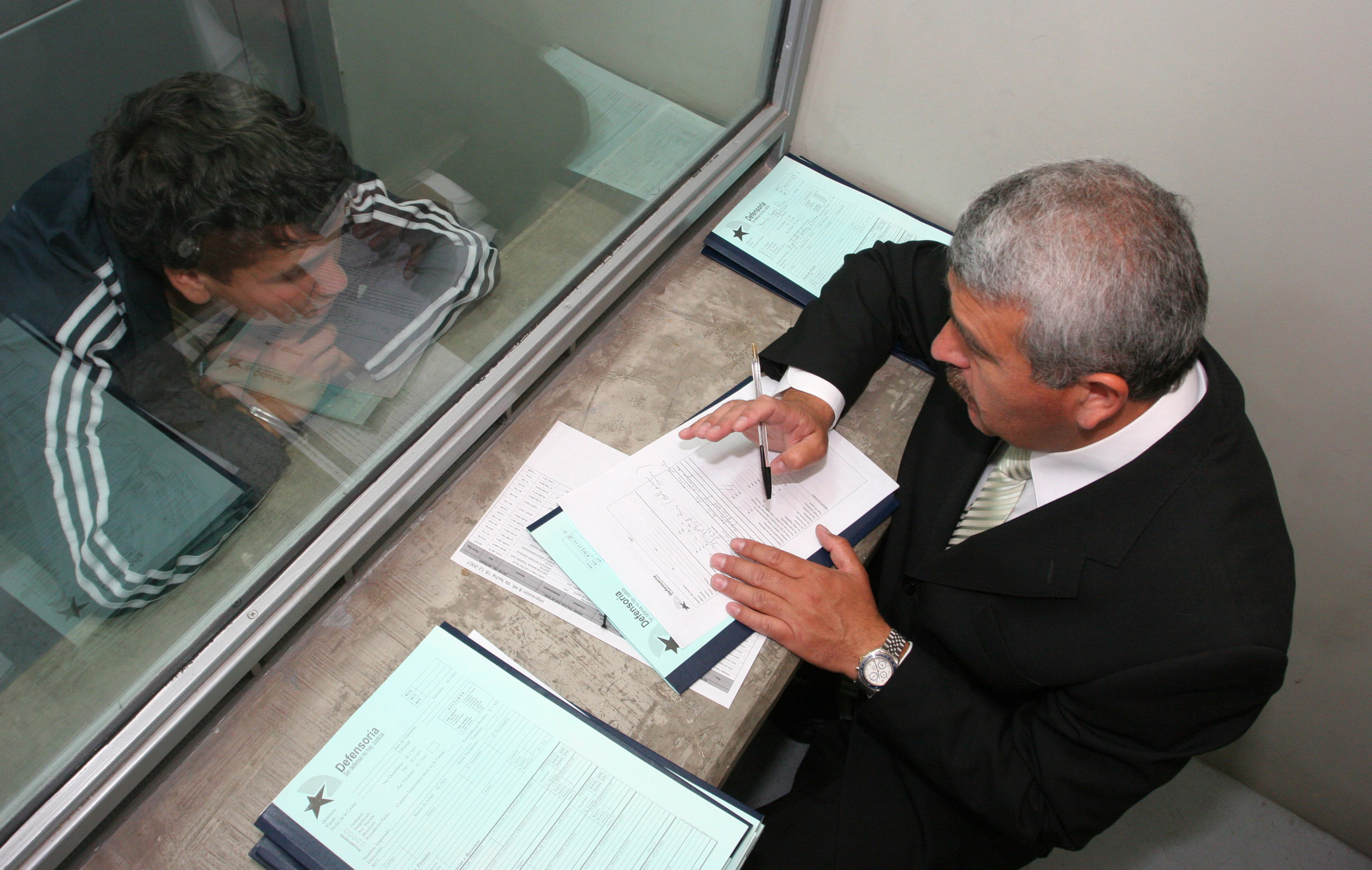
Criminal defence provided by the Public Criminal Defence Office of Chile (free of charge, except for those with financial means).

In criminal law, the right to counsel means a defendant has a legal right to have the assistance of counsel (i.e., lawyers) and, if the defendant cannot afford a lawyer, requires that the government appoint one or pay the defendant's legal expenses. The right to counsel is generally regarded as a constituent of the right to a fair trial. Historically, however, not all countries have always recognized the right to counsel. The right is often included in national constitutions. Of the 194 constitutions currently in force, 153 have language to this effect.

== Around the world ==
=== Australia ===
In Australia, suspects and defendants have the right to have legal representation during investigation and trial. Those under investigation in general have the right to have an attorney present during questioning, but there are exceptions to this right. Australian law does not recognize a right to publicly-funded legal defense, but does recognize that in the absence of counsel the accused may not receive a fair trial as mandated by law. Only the states of New South Wales and Victoria have dedicated public defender systems. Courts have the power to stay proceedings when they determine there is a risk of unfair trial. The High Court of Australia ruled in Dietrich v The Queen that while indigent defendants are not entitled to legal defense as a guaranteed right, a judge should typically grant a request for an adjournment or stay in most serious criminal cases where a defendant is unrepresented, and should allow a trial where a defendant accused of a serious criminal offense is left unrepresented to proceed only in exceptional circumstances.

Each state and territory of Australia has a Legal Aid Commission to provide legal services in criminal, civil, and family law matters to the indigent, but will only assist those who meet their threshold criteria, particularly with regard to income. Anyone accused of a Commonwealth crime, or crime falling within the jurisdiction of the federal government, has the right to ask a judge for counsel within two weeks of committal, and the judge may appoint a lawyer if convinced that the defendant cannot afford counsel. A network of community legal centres also exists to provide legal services free of charge to poor people who do not qualify for Legal Aid. Although they receive federal and state funding, they are independent non-profit organizations which rely on lawyers to staff them on a volunteer basis. Most cannot adequately keep up with demand and must turn some people away. Those who cannot obtain any kind of legal assistance may go unrepresented if they cannot pay for a lawyer.

=== Brazil ===
The Constitution of Brazil declares that all defendants have right to counsel, and mandates that all defendants who cannot pay for an attorney are entitled to state-funded legal representation in all criminal and civil cases. Public defender's offices exist at both state and federal levels as mandated by the constitution. A person must formally declare that they cannot afford regular legal aid to benefit from public defenders' services.

=== Canada ===
In Canada, the right to counsel is guaranteed under Section Ten of the Canadian Charter of Rights and Freedoms upon "arrest and detention", as well as the right to habeas corpus. Police must inform those arrested or detained of their right to speak to counsel and provide them with a reasonable opportunity to do so. However, this does not include an absolute right to have a lawyer present during interrogation unless the accused is under the age of 18. In October 2010, the Supreme Court of Canada affirmed in the case R v Sinclair that the right to counsel during interrogation is not absolute. It said that importing US-style Miranda rights was not in the interests of Canada. The ruling was a bare majority ruling, with a strenuously voiced minority opinion stating that it would lead to more false confessions and wrongful convictions.

=== China ===
According to Article 125 of the Constitution of China and Article 11 of the Criminal Procedure Law of 1996, Chinese citizens have the right to legal counsel in court. The accused's right to counsel in China only comes into being once a case goes to trial. It does not exist at the investigative stage. A suspect under investigation only has the right to retain a lawyer to assist in securing bail, making procedural complaints, and seeking details from the police on the nature of the crime alleged, and not to start building a defense. A suspect gains the right to retain a lawyer upon having been interrogated or subjected to movement restrictions by the authorities. In cases defined as involving state secrets, the right to counsel is more heavily restricted: a lawyer may only be appointed to assist the suspect with the investigating body's permission. Chinese law allows courts to appoint a lawyer for a defendant unable to hire one, and it is mandatory for courts to appoint a lawyer to the blind, deaf, and mute, minors, and anyone facing the death penalty. The Chinese government operates thousands of legal aid centers nationwide for indigent defendants. The provincial governments rather than the central government are responsible for setting the threshold at which an economically disadvantaged person meets the criteria for legal assistance.

In 2022, Chinese justice agencies issued the Opinions on Further Deepening Pilot Efforts on Having Defense Counsel in All Criminal Cases, which translates to Guidelines for Improving Access to Defense Counsel in Criminal Cases (Trial). The guidelines specify procedures to involve defense counsel during both the trial stage and the prosecutorial charging stage. Under these guidelines, where an accused has not retained counsel and meets specified criteria, such as facing a felony-level sentence, involvement in a complex or high-profile case, or refusal to plead guilty, the prosecutor’s office or court must notify public defender offices or legal aid organizations to provide court-appointed counsel or arrange assigned counsel. The guidelines also require prompt appointment of counsel and interagency coordination to ensure that appointed or assigned lawyers are named within a few days, gain access to discovery and prosecutorial materials, and can counsel on plea negotiations and other procedural rights throughout the criminal process.

=== Ethiopia ===
The right to counsel is considered a constitutional right in Ethiopia. As per Article 20(5) of the Constitution of Ethiopia, "Accused persons have the right to be represented by legal counsel of their choice, and, if they do not have sufficient means to pay for it and miscarriage of justice would result, to be provided with legal representation at state expense." Ethiopia has public defender systems at both the federal and regional levels, however problems exist with public defense services being inadequate in some areas. A public defender can be assigned on request of the defendant or if the court so chooses. In addition to the public defender system, the Ethiopian judicial system also provides for private attorneys to offer pro bono representation to indigent defendants. Article 49 of the Federal Court Advocates’ Code of Conduct mandates that private attorneys must offer a minimum of 50 hours of legal representation for free or with minimum payment every year.

=== France ===
The Napoleonic Code of Criminal Instruction, adopted in France in 1808 and inspiring many similar codes in civil law countries, made it compulsory that the defendant should have a lawyer when tried in the assize courts (which judged severe crimes). All criminal defendants in France enjoy right to counsel, and there is also a right to counsel in civil and administrative cases. State-funded legal aid for those facing criminal, civil, and administrative cases is available to those legally resident in France, and in some cases can be used for cases in another jurisdiction in Europe. Eligibility is means-tested, with a sliding scale of support based on income. Those at or below the lowest threshold are entitled to full legal assistance with all costs paid by the state, while higher-income individuals are entitled to have only 55% or 25% of their legal costs covered, depending on their income. State-funded legal advice is provided through a network of public legal advice centers throughout France. Some centers offer free legal advice to anyone living in the department while others restrict their services to those with modest incomes.

=== Germany ===
In Germany, it is mandatory that all defendants charged with a crime carrying a penalty of at least one year in prison have legal counsel, even if they themselves do not wish to have it, and the court will appoint a lawyer to represent a defendant who has not done so. There is no organized public defender system in Germany. The court can appoint any lawyer as counsel to a specific defendant, and a defendant may select a specific lawyer. The defendant will not be charged for legal services if acquitted, but will be liable to pay the lawyer's expenses if convicted unless the court finds that the defendant is indigent. In civil cases, the state provides legal representation, legal advice, and help in covering court costs to those who cannot raise the necessary funds to hire an attorney, but only when it is deemed that there is a reasonable chance of success.

=== India ===
Article 22 of the Constitution of India states that "No person who is arrested shall be detained in custody without being informed, as soon as may be, of the grounds for such arrest nor shall he be denied the right to consult, and to be defended by, a legal practitioner of his choice." In 2011, the Supreme Court of India ruled that a court could not decide a case without a lawyer present for the defendant, and mandated that a court must appoint a lawyer when the defendant cannot afford one. Public legal assistance is provided through the National Legal Services Authority and state-level legal services organizations. Courts appoint legal aid lawyers in both civil and criminal cases.

=== Israel ===
All defendants, detainees, and criminal suspects in Israel are entitled to legal representation in any criminal proceedings pertaining to them and all suspects are also entitled to consult a lawyer prior to police interrogation. However, only those deemed eligible are entitled to state-funded representation if they cannot afford a lawyer. The Israeli Justice Ministry maintains the Public Defense unit to provide state-funded legal counsel to eligible defendants. In criminal trials, all defendants charged with a severe crime carrying a penalty of at least 10 years imprisonment and indigent defendants charged with a crime carrying a penalty of at least 5 years imprisonment are entitled to representation by the Public Defense, as are juveniles and the disabled. All indigent detainees and detainees for whom a request has been filed for remand until the end of proceedings are also entitled to representation from the Public Defense, as are prisoners who are facing parole hearings, anyone facing extradition proceedings, and sentenced defendants requesting retrial when cause is found.

All defendants facing civil cases also have the right to counsel. The Ministry of Justice operates a Legal Aid Department to assist those eligible for state-funded legal aid in civil cases. Legal aid in civil cases is provided for a variety of fields, and applicants must typically meet the financial eligibility test to receive legal aid. However, in some categories of civil cases, legal aid is provided without an examination of financial eligibility.

=== Japan ===
The Constitution of Japan guarantees the right to legal counsel. If a defendant is a minor or is found to be unable to pay for a lawyer, the court may appoint one at no expense to the defendant. The right to court-appointed counsel only exists after charges are brought. Following arrest a suspect is entitled to one free visit from a duty lawyer who will provide legal advice, explain the law and procedures involved, and contact the suspect's family, but the suspect must pay for further assistance from the attorney. Suspects are not entitled to have a lawyer present when interrogated by police.

=== New Zealand ===
There is no guaranteed right to counsel in New Zealand, only the right to appoint counsel if you can afford them. Section 24 of the New Zealand Bill of Rights Act 1990 affirms the right to access counsel but does not specify what happens when a defendant cannot afford a lawyer.

Persons who have been arrested or detained by police are able to access a lawyer for free under the Police Detention Legal Assistance (PDLA) scheme, which was established under the Legal Services Act 2000. The PDLA service is only available to people being detained or questioned by the Police and is not available after their initial arrest nor when being held or questioned by any other law enforcement agency.

New Zealand has a Legal Aid system which provides government funding for lawyers in limited circumstances where defendants cannot afford to retain their own counsel. In most cases, Legal Aid takes the form of a loan which defendants must repay. For the most serious offences, Legal Aid does not require repayment. However, in order to qualify for Legal Aid, defendants must meet certain criteria related to the seriousness of the offence or claim, and must earn an annual income of less than $27,393 NZD (adjustable based on household size). Persons applying for Legal Aid may also be required to sell off virtually all of their property beforehand, including their home, vehicle, furniture, household appliances, clothing, or tools, in order to pay for legal expenses.

As a result of the limitations and shortfalls in these services, it is commonly reported that New Zealander's right to a fair trial is being compromised due to lack of access to counsel.

=== Peru ===
Article 121 of the Peruvian Penal Code states that before the prosecution begins, a judge must inform a defendant of his or her right to counsel, and if the defendant does not choose a lawyer, one will be assigned to the case. If no lawyer is available, an "honorable person" must take the place of a lawyer. Defendants have the right to refuse counsel unless illiterate or a minor, in which case a judge may impose a lawyer on the accused.

=== Portugal ===
Under Article 20 (titled Access to law and effective judicial protection) of the Portuguese Constitution, every citizen has the right to legal information, legal counselling, and legal assistance as part of the wider right to legal protection.

=== Russia ===
All criminal defendants and suspects in Russia have the right to legal assistance. A suspect has the right to a lawyer from the time they are declared a suspect in a criminal case. The Russian Code of Criminal Procedure mandates that if a detained person has no lawyer, the detective, investigator, or judge must request the local bar association to appoint an attorney for the suspect. The head of the bar association then distributes appointments between its members, who do not have the right to refuse the case assignments. The attorney must ask the family of the suspect if they have appointed anyone else, and if not the investigator or judge gives them power of attorney. However, the public defender system has been heavily criticized by Russian lawyers for the way it works in practice. Investigators often appoint lawyers themselves without waiting for the detained to choose, and prefer to appoint lawyers with whom they have a comfortable working relationship, so in practice the publicly appointed lawyers will often in fact help the prosecution by not vigorously defending their clients and simply signing the necessary documents and attending the necessary proceedings, and investigators will stop appointing lawyers who inconvenience the prosecution. Defendants may opt for privately retained counsel instead, though some administrative obstacles exist. For cases tried by the Federal Security Service or Main Investigative Directorate, there is a closed group of attorneys who represent defendants.

=== Singapore ===
The Constitution of Singapore mandates that "Where a person is arrested, he shall be informed as soon as may be of the grounds of his arrest and shall be allowed to consult and be defended by a legal practitioner of his choice." The Supreme Court of Singapore ruled that this means that the accused must be given counsel in a reasonable period of time from the arrest, but not necessarily immediately after the arrest. In criminal cases, the government only provides state-funded legal assistance when the accused faces the death penalty, but it provides legal representation and advice in a variety of civil cases. State-funded legal assistance is provided through the Ministry of Law's Legal Aid Bureau. Most clients must pay a fee to the Legal Aid Bureau, though their financial means are taken into account when the amount they must pay is determined. The Law Society of Singapore also provides pro bono legal representation to indigent defendants facing criminal charges that do not carry the death penalty through its Criminal Legal Aid Scheme.

=== United Kingdom ===
==== England and Wales ====
Before the Prisoners' Counsel Act 1836, felony defendants had the formal right but not any guarantee of being represented by a counsel in English courts although, from the mid-18th century such had been routinely indulged where defendants could afford them. It was thought, at the time, that the presence of defence counsel would serve no purpose in criminal proceedings, where what matters is deciding fact: the defendant should simply tell the truth to the court, without the interference of some counsel. William Hawkins in his A Treatise of the Pleas of the Crown: or a system of the principal matters, relating to that subject, digested under their proper heads Vol. II. of 1721 wrote........

[I]t requires no manner of Skill to make a plain and honest Defence, which ... is always the best; the Simplicity and Innocence, artless and ingenuous Behaviour of one whose Conscience acquits him, having something in it more moving and convincing than the highest Eloquence of a Person speaking in a cause not their own.

This changed as more and more prosecutions became, for reasons of public policy, funded by the Crown, who employed professional counsel. An innate sense of fair-play prevailed therefore, permitting defence counsel to be present, albeit at the defendant's own expense. As such, defendants who could not afford counsel were at a significant disadvantage.

Legal aid in England and Wales is provided through the Legal Aid Agency, which provides aid in both civil and criminal cases. Legal aid in civil cases is means-tested, with only those showing they cannot afford the legal costs and the case is serious eligible. In criminal cases, everyone questioned at a police station is entitled to free legal advice. Legal aid in criminal trials is also means-tested unless the defendant is under 16 or under 18 and in full-time education, or receiving certain benefits. A defendant may be asked to pay a contribution for their defense.

==== Scotland ====
The Scottish Legal Aid Board provides civil and criminal legal aid in Scotland. In criminal cases, legal aid is provided if facing serious charges likely to result in a prison sentence or job loss, the mentally and physically disabled, those who do not speak English as a first language, those held on remand, and those facing appeals. Those requesting legal aid must show that they cannot afford to pay their own legal costs or doing so would be unfair to themselves or their families. Legal aid in civil cases is provided for applicants who show they cannot pay for their own legal costs, as well as those whose cases are deemed to have a legal basis to go forward.

==== Northern Ireland ====
The Legal Services Agency of Northern Ireland provides civil and criminal legal aid. Civil legal aid is means-tested. Criminal legal aid is provided free of charge to anyone facing police questioning. For criminal trials, legal aid is means-tested and is also merit-tested to determine whether it is in the interests of justice that the defendant receive legal aid.

=== United States ===
The Sixth Amendment to the United States Constitution provides:

In all criminal prosecutions, the accused shall enjoy the right…to have the Assistance of Counsel for his defence.

The assistance of counsel clause includes, as relevant here, five distinct rights: the right to counsel of choice, the right to appointed counsel, the right to conflict-free counsel, the effective assistance of counsel, and the right to represent oneself pro se.

A defendant does not have a Sixth Amendment right to counsel in any civil proceeding, including a deportation hearing (even though deportability is often a collateral consequence of criminal conviction). However, as described below, there are certain civil proceedings where parties have a right to appointed counsel; such a right is pursuant to the Fourteenth Amendment's due process or equal protection clause, a state constitution's due process or equal protection clause, or a federal/state statute.

Subject to considerations such as conflicts of interest, scheduling, counsel's authorization to practice law in the jurisdiction, and counsel's willingness to represent the defendant (whether pro bono or for a fee), criminal defendants have a right to be represented by counsel of their choice. The remedy for erroneous deprivation of first choice counsel is automatic reversal.

==== Appointment of counsel for indigent litigants ====
A criminal defendant unable to afford counsel has the right to appointed counsel at the government's expense. While the Supreme Court recognized this right gradually, it currently applies in all federal and state criminal proceedings where the defendant faces authorized imprisonment greater than one year (a "felony") or where the defendant is actually imprisoned, including imposition of a suspended incarceration sentence of any length.

Criminal defendants in misdemeanor cases do not have a right to appointed counsel if they are not sentenced to actual imprisonment, even if that conviction is later used to enhance sentencing for another crime, or even if the revocation of probation may result in actual imprisonment (although for parole revocation, the court evaluates the right to counsel on a case-by-case-basis). Nor does the defendant have the right to appointed counsel to raise frivolous arguments on direct appeal, or to raise any arguments on habeas or other collateral appeal, even if facing execution. One federal court has held that a state court must appoint counsel upon imposition of probation, regardless of whether a separate suspended sentence of incarceration is also imposed and regardless of whether counsel is provided for any subsequent probation revocation proceeding, while others have held or suggested that if probation is imposed without counsel, then a person may not be subsequently jailed for violation of that probation.

With respect to federal law on civil proceedings, there is a constitutional right to counsel for juveniles in delinquency proceedings, and there is a right to "qualified and independent assistance" (although not necessarily an attorney) for prisoners involuntarily transferred to a mental health facility. The federal constitutional right to appointed counsel in termination of parental rights proceedings is on a case-by-case basis. For civil contempt proceedings related to failure to pay child support, the U.S. Supreme Court has said there is no federal constitutional right to counsel even if the litigant is being jailed, provided that all of the following is true: a) the state is providing sufficient procedural safeguards to ensure the person actually has the ability to pay but is refusing to do so; b) the matter is not "unusually complex"; and c) the plaintiff is neither the government nor represented by counsel. Federal statutory law provides for a right to counsel in certain types of federal court proceedings, such as civil forfeiture of a primary residence or proceedings involving those in active military service. Finally, all states provide a right to counsel by either statute, court decision, or court rule in at least some civil proceedings, with the most commonly covered proceedings being termination of parental rights, abuse/neglect, civil commitment, paternity, and civil contempt. The state court decisions can be based on interpretation of either the federal or state constitution, and under basic principles of federalism, a state court can grant more rights under its state constitution than the Supreme Court has recognized under the federal constitution.

==== Conflict-free counsel ====
Whether counsel is retained or appointed, the defendant has a right to counsel without a conflict of interest. If an actual conflict of interest is present, and that conflict results in any adverse effect on the representation, the result is automatic reversal. The general rule is that conflicts can be knowingly and intelligently waived, but some conflicts are unwaivable.

==== Ineffective assistance of counsel ====
In Strickland v. Washington (1984), the Court held that, on collateral review, a defendant may obtain relief if the defendant demonstrates both

1. that defense counsel's performance fell below an objective standard of reasonableness (the "performance prong") and
2. that, but for the deficient performance, there is a reasonable probability that the result of the proceeding would have been different (the "prejudice prong").

To satisfy the prejudice prong of Strickland, a defendant who pleads guilty must show that, but for counsel's deficient performance, they would not have pleaded guilty. In Padilla v. Kentucky (2010), the Court held that counsel's failure to inform an alien pleading guilty of the risk of deportation fell below the objective standard of the performance prong of Strickland and permitted an alien who would not have pleaded guilty but for such failure to withdraw his guilty plea.

==== Pro se representation ====
In Faretta v. California (1975), the court held that a criminal defendant has the right to knowingly and voluntarily opt for pro se representation at trial. This right is not per se violated by the appointment of standby counsel. There is no constitutional right to self-representation on appeal.

== See also ==
- Miranda rights
- Civil rights
- Criminal justice
