= Kenneth L. Curtis =

American convicted murderer

Kenneth L. Curtis (born August 3, 1965) is a former college student from Connecticut who, on October 30, 1987, shot and killed his estranged girlfriend, then shot himself in the head, although he survived. He was charged criminally for the killing, but originally was found mentally incompetent to stand trial, and the criminal charge was dismissed. Years later, he enrolled in college, and pursued studies as a pre-med student. He again was charged with the killing, found competent, and subsequently pleaded guilty to manslaughter.

The case (Connecticut vs. Kenneth Curtis) changed the views in the justice system of mental competence to stand trial. Prior to this case, those given such an assessment were viewed as not restorable, and charges would be dismissed in favor of periodic reviews used only in determining the need for a civil commitment.

== Legal case ==
On October 30, 1987, Curtis shot his estranged girlfriend Donna Kalson in a bar parking lot in Stratford, Connecticut, killing her. He then shot himself in a murder-suicide attempt. He also injured one of Kalson's friends, who was with her. After a lengthy hospitalization in which he was on advanced life support, he survived his own gunshot, leaving him severely disabled. He was partially brain damaged and paralyzed.

After being released from the hospital, Curtis was charged with Kalson's murder and the attempted murder of her friend. Following his recovery, more than a year after the incident, he was given a mental competence evaluation to determine if he could stand trial for his crimes. During the evaluation, it was found that his ability to read or understand were impaired, and he had no memory of the incident. As a result, he was ruled mentally incompetent to stand trial, but not confined to a mental institution. He was allowed to return home. Kalson's family was initially unaware of this.

This did not sit well with Donna Kalson's parents when they learned, following a tip, that Curtis was attending a local college. The Kalsons arranged for their own investigation of Curtis. Reporters for News Channel 8 observed Curtis taking classes at a local college with an apparent goal of a career in psychiatry. His grades were mostly As and Bs; his grade point average after receiving 48 credits was 3.3,; information that was obtained from a search warrant on Curtis's grades at three colleges executed by Stratford police. His actions on campus, including a conversation the reporters had directly with Curtis, were filmed by reporters. While Curtis's defense team called many doctors to testify on his behalf, the video produced by the network was viewed as overwhelming evidence in favor of declaring him mentally competent.

Curtis's defense team attempted to fight the actions taken against him, claiming that he was already declared incompetent and could not be tried due to a Connecticut law that required such closure of all cases of this type after 18 months. They took their battles all the way to the Connecticut Supreme Court. Double jeopardy laws and other laws were not considered to be applicable, and Curtis was ordered to stand trial.

Curtis pleaded guilty in 1999 to manslaughter and received a 20-year prison sentence, the maximum allowed for charges of manslaughter.

Curtis was paroled in 2011.
