= Standby counsel =

Lawyer who assists a client under self-representation

Standby counsel or advisory counsel refers to a lawyer who assists a client who has invoked their right to self-representation. If the client becomes disruptive or otherwise unable to conduct his own defense, the judge may order the standby counsel to take over the defense. Standby counsel also remains available during the trial for consultation. The appointment of standby counsel over a pro se defendant's objection was ruled not to be a violation of the defendant's Sixth Amendment right to self-representation as long as the defendant has a fair opportunity to present his case in his own way and standby counsel's unsolicited involvement is kept within reasonable limits in McKaskle v. Wiggins, 465 U.S. 168 (1984).

Jack Kevorkian had standby counsel in his fifth trial.

Brenton Tarrant had standby counsel when he was sentenced for committing the Christchurch mosque shootings.
