= Estelle v. Smith =

- Supreme Court of the United States

Argued October 8, 1980 Decided May 18, 1981
- Full case name: Estelle, Corrections Director v. Ernest Benjamin Smith
- Citations: 451 U.S. 454 (more) 101 S. Ct. 1866; 68 L. Ed. 2d 359; 1981 U.S. LEXIS 95; 49 U.S.L.W. 4490

Case history
- Prior: Certiorari to the Federal District Court of Appeals

Holding
- "An accused who neither initiates a psychiatric evaluation nor attempts to introduce any psychiatric evidence may not be compelled to respond to a psychiatrist if his statements can be used against him at a capital sentencing proceeding."

Court membership
- Chief Justice Warren E. Burger Associate Justices William J. Brennan Jr. · Potter Stewart; Byron White · Thurgood Marshall; Harry Blackmun · Lewis F. Powell Jr. William Rehnquist · John P. Stevens

Case opinions
- Majority: Burger, joined by Brennan, White, Blackmun, Stevens; Marshall (all but part II-C)
- Concurrence: Brennan
- Concurrence: Marshall
- Concurrence: Stewart, joined by Powell
- Concurrence: Rehnquist

Laws applied
- U.S. Const. amends. V, VI

Estelle v. Smith, 451 U.S. 454 (1981), was a United States Supreme Court case in which the Court held that, per Miranda v. Arizona (1966), the state may not force a defendant to submit to a psychiatric examination solely for the purposes of sentencing. Any such examination violates the defendant's Fifth Amendment rights against self-incrimination as well as the Sixth Amendment right to counsel, and is therefore inadmissible at sentencing.

== Background ==
Ernest Benjamin Smith was indicted for murder for taking part in the armed robbery of a grocery store during which his accomplice fatally shot a clerk. The State of Texas announced its intention to seek the death penalty and the trial judge ordered a competency evaluation of Smith after Smith's indictment and after he had obtained counsel. The evaluation was conducted in the jail by Dr. James P. Grigson who determined that Smith was competent to stand trial. Defense counsel were aware after the fact that Dr. Grigson interviewed Smith when they saw the psychiatric report in the form of a letter filed with the court. In this letter, Dr. Grigson termed Smith "a severe sociopath," but no more specific statements as to Smith's future dangerousness.

Smith was tried by a jury and convicted. The same jury heard a separate sentencing proceeding as required by Texas law. One of the three issues the jury had to determine was the future dangerousness of the defendant and whether he would continue to pose a threat to society. Over the defense counsel's objections, the doctor who conducted the pretrial competency evaluation was allowed to testify and his opinion was that Smith continued to be dangerous and thus would continue to constitute a danger to society. The jury determined the issue of the defendant's dangerousness as well as the other two issues against the defendant, making the death penalty mandatory under Texas law. Smith, along with Howie Robinson, shot and killed William Moon on September 28, 1973 during a convenience store robbery. Robinson was also sentenced to death for the murder.

=== Appeals ===
Smith appealed to the Texas Court of Criminal Appeals which affirmed the conviction and death sentence. Smith's writs of habeas corpus to the state courts were denied so he petitioned Federal District Court for relief. The Federal District Court vacated the death sentence, finding that the trial court erred constitutionally by admitting the doctor's testimony at the penalty phase. The United States Court of Appeals affirmed this decision.

== Opinion of the Court ==
The Supreme Court held that the admission of the doctor's testimony at the penalty phase of the trial violated Smith's Fifth Amendment privilege against forced self-incrimination as he was not told before the pretrial psychiatric examination that he had a right to remain silent and that any statement he made could be used against him at any phase of the trial, including the sentencing phase. Thus the reliance by the State on the pretrial statements made to the doctor in the competency evaluation violated his Fifth Amendment rights in the same manner as forcing Smith to testify against his will at any phase of the trial would do so. The fact that Smith made such statements in the context of a competency does not automatically prevent such statements from being used. If Smith had been warned prior to the evaluation, his Fifth Amendment rights would not have been violated. Warnings at this stage in the interrogation process "apply with no less force" than at other stages. "An accused who neither initiates a psychiatric evaluation nor attempts to introduce any psychiatric evidence may not be compelled to respond to a psychiatrist if his statements can be used against him at a capital sentencing proceeding."

Smith's Sixth Amendment right to the assistance of counsel also was violated when the State introduced doctor's testimony at the penalty phase. Smith already had that right when the doctor examined respondent in jail. As it turned out the competency evaluation was a "critical stage" of the total proceedings against Smith and his attorneys were not notified prior to that evaluation that it would include an estimation of Smith's future dangerousness. Thus Smith was denied the assistance of counsel in making the important decision whether to submit to the examination and to what use the evaluation findings could be employed against him.

== Subsequent developments ==
The prisoner in question, Ernest Smith, had his conviction reduced in June 1981 to 'murder with malice aforethought' and was resentenced to life imprisonment.

Although the court did not address the issue directly, it seemed to implicitly condone the practice of imposing sanctions on defendants who refuse to cooperate with state-order mental health evaluators if the defense gives notice that it intends to raise the question of the defendant's mental health as a defense. In Buchanan v. Kentucky the court found that if the defendant had raised a psychiatric defense and joined in the motion for a psychiatric evaluation, the Constitution was not violated if the prosecution used the examination results to rebut defense claims. The later ruling could be interpreted as meaning that if the defendant requests a competency evaluation, the Fifth Amendment protection is forfeited on any psychiatric issue raised as a defense.

== See also ==
- Barefoot v. Estelle
