= Adjudicative competence =

Competence to stand trial

Adjudicative competence, also referred to as competence to stand trial, is a legal construct describing the criminal defendant's ability to understand and participate in legal proceedings. This includes the defendant's current ability to participate in various pleas and waivers of rights. It is unrelated to any possibility of an insanity plea. It is also unrelated to the ability of the defendant to represent himself, or to any evaluation of mitigation factors. In the United States, the definition of adjudicative competence was provided by the United States Supreme Court in Dusky v. United States.

An empirical basis for the clinical assessment of competence has not yet been established.

== See also ==
- Competence (law)
