= Drope v. Missouri =

- Supreme Court of the United States

Argued November 13, 1974 Decided February 19, 1975
- Full case name: Drope v. Missouri
- Citations: 420 U.S. 162 (more) 95 S. Ct. 896; 43 L. Ed. 2d 419; 43 L. Ed. 2d 103

Case history
- Prior: The Missouri Court of Appeals held that the material presented did not raise reasonable doubt as to his competence to proceed to trial; that defendant's suicide attempt did not create a reasonable doubt as to his competence; that he had not demonstrated any inadequacy in the legal procedures protecting his rights; that the trial court's finding that the defendant's absence from the trial was voluntary was up help.
- Subsequent: Judgment reversed and remanded with directions to ensure competency evaluation before any further trial.

Holding
- The Missouri courts failed to give proper weight to the evidence suggesting petitioner's incompetence. There was insufficient inquiry to provide a basis for deciding the merits of waiving the defendant's right to be present at his trial.

Court membership
- Chief Justice Warren E. Burger Associate Justices William O. Douglas · William J. Brennan Jr. Potter Stewart · Byron White; Thurgood Marshall · Harry Blackmun; Lewis F. Powell Jr. · William Rehnquist

Case opinion
- Majority: Burger, joined by unanimous

Laws applied
- U.S. Const. amend. XIV

Drope v. Missouri, 420 U.S. 162 (1975), was a United States Supreme Court case in which the Court held a Missouri trial court deprived a defendant of due process by failing to order a competency examination after he was hospitalized following an attempted suicide and as a result missed a portion of his trial for a capital offense.

== Circumstances ==
After Drope was indicted in 1969 for the rape of his wife, he filed a motion for a continuance requesting psychiatric evaluation and treatment. Attached to his motion was a psychiatric report recommending psychiatric treatment. This motion was denied and the case went to trial. Drope's wife testimony confirmed Drope's strange behavior described in the psychiatric report. She also testified that Drope had tried to kill her prior to trial. On day two of the trial, Drope shot himself in an attempted suicide and was hospitalized. Although he was absent in court, the trial court denied a motion for a mistrial on the grounds that his absence was voluntary and therefore the trial should continue. The jury found Drope guilty and sentenced him to life imprisonment. Drope filed a motion for a new trial on the grounds the trial court erred in continuing the trial when no evidence was offered to support that his absence was voluntary. This motion was denied based on the finding that his absence was voluntary.

The Missouri Supreme Court affirmed the decision. It also held that the trial court's denial of the motion for a continuance was not an abuse of judicial discretion. Drope's subsequent motion to vacate the conviction and sentence, alleging, among other things, that his constitutional rights had been violated both by the court's failure to order a pretrial psychiatric evaluation and by the trial court's continuing the trial to its completion in his absence, was denied.

The Missouri Court of Appeals also affirmed, holding that neither the psychiatric evaluation attached to Drope's motion for a continuance nor his wife's testimony raised reasonable doubt as to his competence to proceed to trial. It further held that Drope's suicide attempt did not create a reasonable doubt as to his competence and that he had not demonstrated any inadequacy in the legal procedures protecting his rights. The court also affirmed the trial court's finding that his absence from the trial was voluntary.

Drope petitioned the U.S. Supreme Court on a writ of certiorari which the court granted based on Drope's claims that he was deprived of due process of law by the failure of the trial court to order a competency examination to evaluate his competence to stand trial and also regarding the continuation in the defendant's absence of his trial for a capital offense.

== Decision ==
In a unanimous decision, the Supreme Court reversed and remanded. In the decision delivered by Chief Justice Burger, four factors were considered in deciding the reversal.

1. The Missouri courts failed to give proper weight to the evidence suggesting petitioner's incompetence.
2. Regardless of the relationship between mental illness and incompetence to stand trial, in light of the evidence presented of petitioner's behavior, including his suicide attempt, there was no opportunity to evaluate this relationship without his presence at trial. Therefore, the trial should have been suspended until such an evaluation could be made.
3. Even if the petitioner's right to be present at the trial is a right that could be waived, there was an insufficient inquiry to provide a basis for deciding the merits of the issue of such a waiver.
4. The petitioner's due process rights would not be adequately protected by remanding the case for a psychiatric examination to determine whether he was, in fact, competent to stand trial in 1969. However, the State is free to retry him if he is competent to be tried at the time of another trial.

== Significance ==
The issue of competency to stand trial is concerned with the defendant's present level of functioning; the finding of a current mental illness is not necessarily relevant to a finding of Incompetence to Stand Trial. In the current case, the Supreme Court clearly takes the position that in weighing whether any doubt exists as to the defendant's competency, the trial court must consider any evidence suggestive of mental illness, even one factor alone in some circumstances, may be sufficient to warrant an evaluation. Therefore, the threshold for obtaining a competency evaluation is not very high. The court takes the position that when the issues is raised, regardless of who raises it, the motion should be granted. Further, the court suggests that it would be unconstitutional for a court to take the position that the defendant must bear all the burden for raising the issue. This has come to mean that in practice that rarely will a court refuse a request for a competency evaluation, if only to avoid a reversal by a higher court after a conviction on the grounds of a due process violation.

== See also ==
- List of United States Supreme Court cases, volume 420
