= Godinez v. Moran =

- Supreme Court of the United States

Argued April 21, 1993 Decided June 24, 1993
- Full case name: Salvador Godinez, Warden v. Richard Allan Moran
- Citations: 509 U.S. 389 (more) 113 S.Ct. 2680; 125 L. Ed. 2d 321; 1993 U.S. LEXIS 4396

Case history
- Prior: Moran v. Godinez, 972 F.2d 263 (9th Cir. 1992); cert. granted, 506 U.S. 1033 (1992).

Holding
- The competency standard for pleading guilty is the same as the competency standard for standing trial

Court membership
- Chief Justice William Rehnquist Associate Justices Byron White · Harry Blackmun; John P. Stevens · Sandra Day O'Connor; Antonin Scalia · Anthony Kennedy; David Souter · Clarence Thomas

Case opinions
- Majority: Thomas, joined by Rehnquist, White, O'Connor, Souter; Scalia, Kennedy (Parts I, II-B, III)
- Concurrence: Kennedy (in part and in judgment), joined by Scalia
- Dissent: Blackmun, joined by Stevens

Laws applied
- U.S. Const. amend. XIV

Godinez v. Moran, 509 U.S. 389 (1993), is a landmark decision in which the U.S. Supreme Court ruled that if a defendant was competent to stand trial, they were automatically competent to plead guilty, and thereby waive the panoply of trial rights, including the right to counsel.

== Circumstances ==
On August 2, 1984, Richard Allen Moran entered the Red Pearl Saloon in Las Vegas, Nevada and shot the bartender and a customer before robbing the cash register. Nine days later he shot his ex-wife and then himself, and also unsuccessfully tried to slit his wrists. On August 13 Moran summoned the police to his hospital bedside and confessed to the killings.

He was charged with three counts of first-degree murder, but pleaded not guilty. Two court-ordered psychiatrists concluded that he was competent to stand trial, although both noted he was depressed.

The prosecution sought the death penalty. Two months after the psychiatric evaluations, Moran stated to the court that he wished to discharge his attorneys and change his plea to guilty. He also waived his right to counsel. After his trial he was sentenced to death. Moran then sought state post conviction relief on the grounds that he was mentally incompetent to represent himself. The trial court held an evidentiary hearing and then it rejected his claim.

== Appeals ==
Moran's appeal to the Nevada Supreme Court was dismissed and a Federal District Court denied his petition for a writ of habeas corpus. However, the Court of Appeals reversed this decision, concluding that due process required the trial court to hold a hearing to "evaluate and determine" Moran's competency before accepting his decisions to waive counsel and plead guilty. It also held that the trial court erred by using the wrong legal standard. It stated that competency to waive constitutional rights requires a higher level of mental functioning than the level of mental functioning required to stand trial. They reasoned that competence to stand trial requires only that the defendant have a rational and factual understanding of the proceedings and is capable of assisting his counsel, while competence to waive counsel or plead guilty requires that the defendant has the capacity for reasoned choice among those choices available.

Moran petitioned the Supreme Court on a writ of certiorari.

== Decision ==
In a split decision (7–2), the Court found that competency to stand trial and competency to plead guilty were equivalent competencies. Therefore, if a person was found competent for one, the person was automatically competent for the second. Further, the court held that a person who is competent to stand trial is also competent to waive an attorney and proceed pro se. The court held that it was irrelevant if the individual represented himself inadequately.

Justice Kennedy stated in his concurring opinion: "At common law, therefore, no attempt was made to apply different competency standards to different stages of criminal proceedings or to the variety of decisions that a defendant must make during the course of those proceedings." Further, the Due Process Clause "does not mandate different standards of competency at various stages of or for different decisions made during the criminal proceedings."

== Implications for evaluation ==
Following this decision, a forensic clinician conducting a competency evaluation for competency to stand trial, should also include an evaluation of competency to waive counsel.

== Subsequent developments ==
Moran was executed by lethal injection on March 30, 1996. He remains the only person to be executed involuntarily in Nevada since the reinstatement of capital punishment.

The Court later held in Indiana v. Edwards that the competency to stand trial was different from the competency to have self-representation.

== See also ==
- List of United States Supreme Court cases, volume 509
- List of United States Supreme Court cases
- Lists of United States Supreme Court cases by volume
- List of United States Supreme Court cases by the Rehnquist Court
- Competency evaluation
- List of criminal competencies
- Indiana v. Edwards

General:

- Capital punishment in Nevada
- Capital punishment in the United States
- List of people executed in Nevada
- List of people executed in the United States in 1996
