= Pro se legal representation in the United States =

Latin for "for oneself"

Pro se legal representation (/ˌproʊ ˈsiː/ or /ˌproʊ ˈseɪ/) means to argue on one's own behalf in a legal proceeding, as a defendant or plaintiff in civil cases, or a defendant in criminal cases, rather than have representation from counsel or an attorney.

Pro se is a Latin legal term meaning "for oneself" or "on behalf of themselves". This status is sometimes known as in propria persona (abbreviated to "pro per"). In England and Wales the comparable status is that of "litigant in person". In Australia and Canada, the term is self-represented litigant (SRL).

== Prevalence ==
According to the National Center for State Courts in the United States, as of 2006 pro se litigants had become more common in both state courts and federal courts. This increase is due to a number of factors, including a fall in funding for federal legal aid, an increase in provision of limited legal assistance, and increase in divorce rates. Estimates of the pro se rate in family law cases overall averaged 67% in California, 73% in Florida's large counties, and 70% in some Wisconsin counties. In San Diego, for example, the number of divorce filings involving at least one pro se litigant rose from 46% in 1992 to 77% in 2000, in Florida from 66% in 1999 to 73% in 2001. California reports in 2001 that over 50% of family matters filings in custody and visitation are by pro se litigants. In the U.S. Federal Court system for the year 2013 approximately 27% of civil actions, 92% of prisoner petitions and 11% of non-prisoner petitions were filed by pro se litigants. Defendants in political trials tend to participate in the proceedings more than defendants in non-political cases, as they may have greater ability to depart from courtroom norms to speak to political and moral issues.

== History ==
In Faretta v. California, the Supreme Court of the United States stated:

In the federal courts, the right of self-representation has been protected by statute since the beginnings of our Nation. Section 35 of the Judiciary Act of 1789, 1 Stat. 73, 92, enacted by the First Congress and signed by President Washington one day before the Sixth Amendment was proposed, provided that "in all the courts of the United States, the parties may plead and manage their own causes personally or by the assistance of counsel."

The Court's opinion went on to hold that criminal defendants, in state courts, have a constitutional right to refuse counsel and represent themselves.

However, the right to represent oneself is not absolute. Courts have the authority and duty to determine whether a particular individual is capable of representing himself or herself. In Godinez v. Moran, the Supreme Court found being competent to stand trial is equivalent to being competent to plead guilty, which further meant being competent to waive legal representation. The later Indiana v. Edwards decision allows a court to inquire into the individual's lucidity and mental capacity, and sets competency to represent oneself as distinct from one's competency to stand trial.

Martinez v. Court of Appeal of California determined that an appellant who is the defendant in a criminal case cannot refuse the assistance of counsel on direct appeal whereas Faretta v. California allows criminal defendants to proceed pro se for their own defense.

== Rules ==
The U.S. Judiciary Act, the Code of Conduct for United States Judges, addresses the rights of the self-represented litigant in several places.

28 U.S.C. § 1654 provides: "In all courts of the United States the parties may plead and conduct their own cases personally or by counsel as, by the rules of such courts, respectively, are permitted to manage and conduct causes therein."

Laws and organizations charged with regulating judicial conduct may also affect pro se litigants. For example, the Judicial Council of California officially advocates treating self-represented litigants fairly. The California rules allow for accommodating mistakes by a pro se litigant that would otherwise result in a dismissal, if the case is otherwise merited. According to a June 2012 report from U.S. Courts, 18 of 94 federal district courts authorize use of alternative dispute resolution (ADR) for pro ses and 11 authorize use of ADR by prisoner pro ses.

=== Electronic filings ===
Some districts of the United States federal courts (e.g., the Central District of California) permit pro se litigants to receive documents electronically by an Electronic Filing Account (ECF), but only members of the bar are allowed to file documents electronically. Other districts (e.g. the Northern District of Florida) permit pro se litigants to file and receive their documents electronically by following the same local requirements as licensed attorneys for PACER NEXT GEN qualifications and approval for electronic use in particular cases; an order of the assigned judge on a pro se motion showing pro se's qualifications may be required. A 2011 report from the Federal Judicial Center found 37 of the 94 district courts allow pro se litigants to use ECF.

=== Limits ===
A longstanding and widely practiced rule prohibits corporations from being represented by non-attorneys, consistent with the existence of a corporation as a "person" separate and distinct from its shareholders, officers and employees. The Wisconsin Supreme Court has ruled that a "nonlawyer may not sign and file a notice of appeal on behalf of a corporation. Requiring a lawyer to represent a corporation in filing the notice does not violate the guarantee that any suitor may prosecute or defend a suit personally. A corporation is not a natural person and does not fall within the term "any suitor."

Similarly, a pro se litigant may not act as a class representative in a class action and therefore a pro se litigant may not bring a class action. Furthermore, a non-attorney parent may not appear on behalf of his or her child, except to appeal the denial of social security benefits to such child.

Another situation in which appearance through counsel is often required is in a case involving the executor or personal administrator of a probate estate. Unless the executor or administrator is himself an attorney, he is not allowed to represent himself in matters other than the probate.

Some federal courts of appeals allow unrepresented litigants to argue orally (even so nonargument disposition is still possible), and in all courts the percentage of cases in which argument occurs is higher for counseled cases. In 2013, the U.S. Supreme Court adopted a rule, Rule 28.8, that all persons arguing orally must be attorneys, although the Supreme Court claims it was simply codifying a "long-standing practice of the court." The last non-attorney to argue orally before the Supreme Court was Sam Sloan in 1978. Some lawyers, such as University of Chicago Law School professor Will Baude, have argued that the rule might not be legally valid, and could be challenged by a litigant who might want to appear pro se.

Some courts issue orders against self representation in civil cases. A court enjoined a former attorney from suing the new lover of her former boyfriend and colleague. The Superior Court of Bergen New Jersey also issued an order against pro se litigation based on a number of lawsuits that were dismissed and a failure to provide income tax returns in case sanctions might issue. The Superior Court of New Jersey issued an order prohibiting a litigant from filing new lawsuits. The Third Circuit however ruled that a restriction on pro se litigation went too far and that it could not be enforced if a litigant certified that he has new claims that were never before disposed of on the merits. The 10th Circuit ruled that before imposing filing restrictions, a district court must set forth examples of abusive filings and that if the district court did not do so, the filing restrictions must be vacated. The District of Columbia Court of Appeals wrote that "private individuals have 'a constitutional right of access to the courts', that is, the 'right to sue and defend in the courts'."

== Effectiveness ==
In 2011, the Federal Judicial Conference surveyed federal court clerks offices regarding pro se issues. They found that only 17 of 62 responding judges report that discovery is taken in most non prisoner pro se cases and only 13 reported that discovery is taken in most prisoner pro se cases. In the same survey, 37% of judges found that most pro ses had problems examining witnesses, while 30% found that pro ses had no or few problems examining witnesses. 53% found that represented parties sometimes or frequently take advantage of pro se parties. Only 5% reported problems of pro ses behaving inappropriately at hearings. Respondents to the FJC study did not report any orders against non prisoner pro se litigation.

Pro se litigants may have a lower chance of success. The Louisiana Court of Appeals tracks the results of pro se appeals against represented appeals. In 2000, 7% of writs in civil appeals submitted to the court pro se were granted, compared to 46% of writs submitted by counsel. In criminal cases the ratio is closer – 34% of pro se writs were granted, compared with 45% of writs submitted by counsel. According to Erica J. Hashimoto, then an assistant professor at the University of Georgia School of Law:

After conducting an empirical study of pro se felony defendants, I conclude that these defendants are not necessarily either ill-served by the decision to represent themselves or mentally ill. ... In state court, pro se defendants charged with felonies fared as well as, and arguably significantly better than, their represented counterparts ... of the 234 pro se defendants for whom an outcome was provided, just under 50 percent of them were convicted on any charge. ... for represented state court defendants, by contrast, a total of 75 percent were convicted of some charge. ... Only 26 percent of the pro se defendants ended up with felony convictions, while 63 percent of their represented counterparts were convicted of felonies ... in federal court ... the acquittal rate for pro se defendants is virtually identical to the acquittal rate for represented defendants.

== In criminal court ==
Some pro se litigants who are federal prisoners are subject to the Prison Litigation Reform Act. The American Civil Liberties Union (ACLU) has asserted: "For over thirteen years, the Prison Litigation Reform Act has denied access to the courts to countless prisoners who have become victims of abuse, creating a system of injustice that denies redress for prisoners alleging serious abuses, barriers that don't apply to anyone else. It is time for Congress to pass legislation to restore the courts as a needed check on prisoner abuse." 54% of judges responding to a Federal Judicial Conference survey use videoconferences for prisoner pro se hearings.

The Connecticut Supreme Court narrowed criminal defendant's right to self representation, stating that "we are free to adopt for mentally ill or mentally incapacitated defendants who wish to represent themselves at trial a competency standard that differs from the standard for determining whether such a defendant is competent to stand trial". A Senior Assistant State's Attorney explained that the new standard essentially allows judges to consider whether the defendants are competent enough to perform the skills needed to defend themselves, including composing questions for voir dire and witnesses.

== In civil court ==
There is evidence that self-representation is common in civil cases:

- In New Hampshire one party is pro se in 85% of all civil cases in the district court and 48% of all civil cases in the superior court in 2004. In probate court, both sides are unrepresented by lawyers in 38% of cases. In superior court domestic relations cases, almost 70% of cases have one pro se party, while in district court domestic violence cases, 97% of the cases have one pro se party.
- In California, one party appeared pro se in 2/3 of all domestic relations cases and in 40% of all child custody cases between 1991 and 1995. California reports in 2001 that over 50% of the filings in custody and visitation are by pro se litigants. Urban courts report that approximately 80% of the new divorce filings are filed pro se.
- In Chicago in 1994, 30% of general civil actions filed for less than $10,000 of damages were filed pro se. Landlord tenant actions were filed pro se 28% of the time.
- Utah Judicial Council reports that in 2006 for divorce cases, 49 percent of petitioners and 81 percent of respondents are self-represented. For small-claims cases, 99 percent of petitioners and 99 percent of respondents are self-represented.
- The rate of non-attorney filings in bankruptcy courts by debtors, according to University of Illinois Law School's Professor Robert Lawless was 13.8% for chapter 13 cases, and 10.1% for chapter 7 cases. The rate was as high as 30% to 45% for major urban areas, such as California and New York City. US Bankruptcy Court of Arizona reported 23.14% cases filed pro se in October 2011, up from 20.61% a year before.
- There are some notable records of pro se litigants winning large amounts as plaintiffs, including Robert Kearns, inventor of the intermittent windshield wiper, who won more than $10 million from Ford for patent infringement, and Dr. Julio Perez (District of Southern New York 10-cv-08278), who won approximately $5 million in a federal jury trial from Progenics Pharmaceuticals for wrongful termination as a result of whistleblowing. Jennifer Lynn Espinosa (King County Washington State 17-2-21629-1 KNT) was awarded $3.5 million and the Default Judgment, and $3.5 million and the Final Judgment, when the defendants did not appear or respond to the 20-day summons and complaint for a legal malpractice case. There was no appeal. Jennifer is still waiting for payment from the defendants.

== In executive agencies ==
The United States Patent and Trademark Office permits inventors to file and prosecute patent applications pro se and provides resources for them to do so.

== Motivation ==
According to the 1996 report on pro se by University of Maryland Law School, 57% of pro se said they could not afford a lawyer, 18% said they did not wish to spend the money to hire a lawyer, 21% said they believed that their case was simple and therefore they did not need an attorney. Also, ABA Legal Needs Study shows that 45% of pro se believe that "Lawyers are more concerned with their own self promotion than their client's best interest."

Defendants who choose to appear pro se may do so because they believe they may gain tactical advantages against the prosecutor, such as obtaining sympathy from the jury, the opportunity to personally address the jury and witnesses. Pro se appearances may also delay the trial proceedings and enhance the possibility of a mistrial and a subsequent appeal.

Once convicted, a prisoner no longer has the right to a public defender. Motions for post conviction relief are considered civil motions. Brandon Moon is an example of an unsuccessful pro se litigant who became successful when his case was taken by a lawyer. Moon's case was taken by the Innocence Project, and he was released after 17 years in jail for a rape that he did not commit.

== Attorney fees ==
The Supreme Court has held that where a statute permits attorney's fees to be awarded to the prevailing party, the attorney who prevails in a case brought under a federal statute as a pro se litigant is not entitled to an award of attorney's fees. This ruling was based on the court's determination that such statutes contemplate an attorney-client relationship between the party and the attorney prosecuting or defending the case, and that Congress intends to encourage litigants to seek the advice of a competent and detached third party. As the court noted, the various circuits had previously agreed in various rulings "that a pro se litigant who is not a lawyer is not entitled to attorney's fees".

Narrow exceptions to this principle have also been suggested by other courts in the United States. For example, according to one district court a state-licensed attorney who is acting as pro se may collect attorney's fees when he represents a class (of which he is a member) in a class-action lawsuit, or according to another court represents a law firm of which he is a member. In each of those instances, a non-attorney would be barred from conducting the representation altogether. One district court found that this policy does not prevent a pro se attorney from recovering fees paid for consultations with outside counsel. Pro se who are not state-licensed attorneys cannot bring up a class action lawsuit.

Federal courts can impose liability for the prevailing party's attorney fees to the losing party if the judge considers the case frivolous or for purpose of harassment, even when the case was voluntarily dismissed. In the case of Fox v. Vice, U.S. Supreme Court held that reasonable attorneys' fees could be awarded to the defendant under 42 U.S.C. Sec. 1988, but only for costs that the defendant would not have incurred "but for the frivolous claims." Unless there is an actual trial or judgment, if there is only pre-trial motion practice such as motions to dismiss, attorney fee shifting can only be awarded under FRCP Rule 11 and it requires that the opposing party file a Motion for Sanctions and that the court issue an order identifying the sanctioned conduct and the basis for the sanction. Pro se still has a right to appeal any order for sanctions in the higher court. In the state courts, however, each party is generally responsible only for its own attorney fees, with certain exceptions.

== Resources ==
According to Utah Judicial Council report of 2006, 80 percent of self-represented people coming to the district court clerk's office seek additional help before coming to the courthouse. About 60 percent used the court's website, 19 percent sought help from a friend or relative, 11 percent from the court clerk, and 7 percent went to the library. In the justice courts, 59 percent sought no help.

Many pro se resources come from these sources: local courts, which may offer limited self-help assistance; public interest groups such as the American Bar Association, which sponsors reform and promotes resources for self-help; and commercial services, which sell pre-made forms allowing self-represented parties to have formally correct documents. For example, the Self-Represented Litigation Network (SRLN) is an organization whose web site, srln.org, is dedicated to issues related to self-represented litigation and offers a curated resource library for legal professionals (courts, lawyers, and allies) engaged in pro se litigation. The organization provides no assistance with particular complaints. "Self-help" legal service providers must take care not to cross the line into giving advice, in order to avoid "unauthorized practice of law", which in the U.S. is the unlawful act of a non-lawyer practicing law.

The American Bar Association (ABA) has also been involved with issues related to self-representation. In 2008, the Louis M. Brown Award for Legal Access was presented to the Chicago-Kent College of Law Center for Access to Justice & Technology for making justice more accessible to the public through the use of the Internet in teaching, legal practice and public access to the law. Their A2J Author Project is a software tool that empowers those from the courts, legal services programs and educational institutions to create guided interviews resulting in document assembly, electronic filing and data collection. Viewers using A2J to go through a guided interview are led down a virtual pathway to the courthouse. As they answer simple questions about their legal issue, the technology then "translates" the answers to create, or assemble, the documents that are needed for filing with the court.

An ABA publication lists "organizations involved in pro se issues" as including (in addition to the ABA itself) the American Judicature Society, the National Center for State Courts, and the State Justice Institute.

Many federal courts publish procedural guides for pro se litigants. and they've also published the Civil Rights complaint forms. Many state courts also publish procedural guides for pro se litigants and some states have organizations dedicated to delivering services to pro se litigants. For instance, the Minnesota Bar Association has a "pro se implementation committee".

United States federal courts created the Public Access to Court Electronic Records (PACER) system to obtain case and docket information from the United States district courts, United States courts of appeals, and United States bankruptcy courts. The system, managed by the Administrative Office of the United States Courts, allows lawyers and self-represented clients to obtain documents entered in the case much faster than regular mail. However, the system charges fees, which were the subject of a class action lawsuit ongoing as of 2019.

Freely accessible web search engines can assist pro se in finding court decisions that can be cited as an example or analogy to resolve similar questions of law or in searching specific state courts. Google Scholar is the biggest database of full text state and federal courts decisions that can be accessed without charge.

In 2017, federal circuit court judge Richard Posner retired and founded a pro-bono group for helping pro se litigants, named the Posner Center of Justice for Pro Se's. The Posner Center of Justice was later dissolved in 2019 after the number of assistance requests from pro se litigants overwhelmed the available staff.

=== Court-based self-help centers ===
Court-based self-help centers have become increasingly prevalent across the United States, serving approximately 3.7 million people in 2016. The main activities of self-help centers are to provide information, support with form-completion, and referral to other resources for pro se litigants. The goal of self-help centers are provide accessible, free, immediate help to people without legal representation involved in civil cases.

Some of the first self-help center pilot programs in the country emerged in California in the 1990s. The California Judicial Committee has invested The California Commission on Access to Justice was established in 1996, as well as the Task Force on Self-Represented Litigants in 2001, which produced the Statewide Action Plan for Serving Self-Represented Litigants in 2004. The Judicial Council of California's 2021 report, Impact of Self-Help Center Expansion in California Courts found that self-help services increase the efficiency of courts as well as improve outcomes for pro se litigants.

In addition to attorneys and paralegals, many self-help centers are staffed by students and recent college graduates through programs such as California's JusticeCorps, which trains participants to administer workshops, provide one-on-one assistance to pro se litigants, and other tasks.

== Notable pro se litigants ==
- Clarence Earl Gideon was too poor to afford an attorney, and thus proceeded pro se in his criminal trial in Florida in 1961. He was found guilty and subsequently appealed. He was appointed counsel (his attorney, Abe Fortas, later became a Supreme Court Justice) when the case reached the U.S. Supreme Court; the court ruled in Gideon v. Wainwright that the right to counsel extended to the states as well as the federal government. The decision said that Florida's failure to appoint such counsel in Gideon's case constituted a violation of that right and required states to provide counsel free of charge to indigent defendants in all criminal cases in the future.
- James Blumstein represented himself before the U.S. Supreme Court in 1971. Blumstein had recently moved to Tennessee, and he had sought to register to vote. At the time, Tennessee refused to allow anyone to register to vote unless the registrant had lived in Tennessee for at least one year. Blumstein argued that the durational residency requirement for voter registration was unconstitutional. Blumstein won his case 6–1.
- Ted Bundy, despite having five court-appointed attorneys, made pro se appearances in his Florida murder trial beginning in June 1979. The trial was covered by 250 reporters from five continents, and was the first to be televised nationally in the United States.
- Gerald Gallego acted as his own lawyer during his murder trial in Martinez, California, despite having had no formal law education. Following his conviction, he hired a lawyer to represent him during the penalty phase, which ended in June 1983 with him being sentenced to death.
- Robert Kearns was the inventor of the intermittent windshield wipers. He acted as his own lawyer in parts of his long legal battles for patent infringement against Ford and Chrysler.
- Edward C. Lawson, an African-American civil rights activist, was the pro se defendant in Kolender v. Lawson (461 U.S. 352, 1983), in which the U.S. Supreme Court held a California statute unconstitutionally vague for requiring "credible and reliable" identification.
- Sam Sloan is the last non-lawyer to argue a case before the Supreme Court. He did so in 1978. The Court ruled in his favor, 9–0. The Court prohibited non-lawyers in 2013.
- Jim Traficant, a former U.S. Representative from Ohio, represented himself in a Racketeer Influenced and Corrupt Organizations Act case in 1983, and was acquitted of all charges. Traficant would represent himself again in 2002, this time unsuccessfully, and was sentenced to prison for eight years for taking bribes, filing false tax returns, and racketeering.
- Darrell Brooks represented himself in his trial for the Waukesha Christmas parade attack in 2022. The trial attracted particular media attention due to Brooks' continuous disruptive behaviour throughout the trial and his heated exchanges with witnesses, the prosecution and the judge. Brooks also used sovereign citizen arguments. Videos of his court appearances racked up to 3 million views on YouTube. He was found guilty of all counts and sentenced to multiple life terms without the possibility of parole.
- Christian Worley, a 27-year-old woman with endometriosis, represented herself pro se in a federal disability discrimination lawsuit against the North Carolina Department of Public Safety after multiple attorneys declined to take her case, saying the law was too underdeveloped to meaningfully address endometriosis under the Americans with Disabilities Act of 1990. Worley filed suit after her employer categorically denied her request to telework one day per month for debilitating period pain caused by endometriosis, which ultimately led to her resignation. Her case survived summary judgment in July 2025 when a federal magistrate judge ruled that endometriosis can qualify as a disability under the ADA and that a jury could find her requested telework accommodation reasonable, marking the first time in North Carolina that endometriosis was found to meet ADA disability standards.The lawsuit settled in December 2025 with favorable monetary terms and a commitment by the agency to improve ADA training for management.

== See also ==
- Litigant in person
- Young v. Facebook, Inc., an example of pro se litigation in a civil case in the United States
- Ouellette v. Viacom International Inc., another example of a pro se U.S. litigant.
