= Faretta v. California =

- Supreme Court of the United States

Argued November 19, 1974 Decided June 30, 1975
- Full case name: Anthony Pasquall Faretta v. State of California
- Citations: 422 U.S. 806 (more) 95 S. Ct. 2525; 45 L. Ed. 2d 562; 1975 U.S. LEXIS 83

Case history
- Prior: On writ of certiorari to the Court of Appeal of California, Second Appellate District, 415 U.S. 975 (1974).

Holding
- A criminal defendant in a state proceeding has a constitutional right to knowingly refuse the aid of an attorney.

Court membership
- Chief Justice Warren E. Burger Associate Justices William O. Douglas · William J. Brennan Jr. Potter Stewart · Byron White; Thurgood Marshall · Harry Blackmun; Lewis F. Powell Jr. · William Rehnquist

Case opinions
- Majority: Stewart, joined by Douglas, Brennan, White, Marshall, Powell
- Dissent: Burger, joined by Blackmun, Rehnquist
- Dissent: Blackmun, joined by Burger, Rehnquist

Faretta v. California, 422 U.S. 806 (1975), was a case in which the Supreme Court of the United States held that criminal defendants have a constitutional right to refuse counsel and represent themselves in state criminal proceedings.

Quoting Adams v. United States ex rel. McCann (1942), the Court reasoned that, "The right to assistance of counsel and the correlative right to dispense with a lawyer's help are not legal formalisms... To deny an accused a choice of procedure in circumstances in which he, though a layman, is as capable as any lawyer of making an intelligent choice, is to impair the worth of great Constitutional safeguards by treating them as empty verbalisms. … [T]o deny him in the exercise of his free choice the right to dispense with some of these safeguards … is to imprison a man in his privileges, and call it the Constitution."

== Facts of the case ==
The defendant Anthony Faretta was accused of grand theft in Los Angeles County, California. Well before the trial began, the defendant requested permission to represent himself. Questioning by the judge revealed that he had once represented himself in a criminal case and that he believed that the public defender's office was under a heavy case load. The judge warned him that he was making a mistake and emphasized that he would receive no special treatment. The judge entered a preliminary ruling allowing Faretta to represent himself, however stating that he might reverse his decision if it seemed that he was unable to adequately represent himself.

Several weeks later, but still before the trial, the judge initiated a hearing to inquire into Faretta's ability to defend himself. After questioning him on numerous topics, including hearsay and juries, the judge ruled that his answers were inadequate and he had not made an intelligent decision to waive counsel. In addition he ruled that Faretta had no constitutional right to his own defense. Therefore, he rescinded his previous decision. During the trial the judge denied Faretta's motions to be co-counsel and other motions he attempted to make on his own behalf. Subsequently, he was convicted by a jury and sentenced to time in prison.

The California Court of Appeal, which relied on a recent California Supreme Court decision that had expressly decided the issue, ruled that Faretta had no federal or state right to represent himself. Appeal to the Supreme Court of California was denied.

== Opinion of the court ==
In the opinion of the court by Justice Stewart, the Court held that a defendant in a state criminal trial has the constitutional right to refuse appointed counsel and conduct the trial when he or she voluntarily and intelligently elects to do so. However, such a defendant may not later complain that he received ineffective assistance of counsel. The court brought analogies to the Star Chamber, saying "the Star Chamber has, for centuries, symbolized disregard of basic individual rights. The Star Chamber not merely allowed, but required, defendants to have counsel. The defendant's answer to an indictment was not accepted unless it was signed by counsel. When counsel refused to sign the answer, for whatever reason, the defendant was considered to have confessed."

== Dissents ==
Chief Justice Burger wrote a dissenting opinion, arguing there is no constitutional basis for a right to self-representation, in which Justice Blackmun and Justice Rehnquist joined.

Justice Blackmun wrote a dissent arguing that the Sixth Amendment does not support the right to self-representation and raised the additional procedural problems that would inevitably arise by the decision, arguing that such procedural problems would far outweigh whatever tactical advantage the defendant may feel he has gained by electing to represent himself. Blackmun concludes with the following: "If there is any truth to the old proverb 'one who is his own lawyer has a fool for a client', the Court by its opinion today now bestows a constitutional right on one to make a fool of himself". Chief Justice Burger and Justice Rehnquist joined in this dissent.

== See also ==
- List of United States Supreme Court cases, volume 422
- List of criminal competencies
- Frendak v. United States (D.C. 1979)
