= Ford v. Wainwright =

- Supreme Court of the United States

Argued April 22, 1986 Decided June 26, 1986
- Full case name: Ford v. Wainwright
- Docket no.: 85-5542
- Citations: 477 U.S. 399 (more) 106 S. Ct. 2595; 91 L. Ed. 2d 335; 1986 U.S. LEXIS 64; 54 U.S.L.W. 4799
- Argument: Oral argument

Case history
- Prior: Certiorari to the U.S. Court of Appeals for the Eleventh Circuit
- Subsequent: Post-conviction relief denied at, Writ of habeas corpus denied Ford v. State, 522 So. 2d 345 (Fla., 1988)

Holding
- The Eighth Amendment prohibits the execution of the insane.

Court membership
- Chief Justice Warren E. Burger Associate Justices William J. Brennan Jr. · Byron White; Thurgood Marshall · Harry Blackmun; Lewis F. Powell Jr. · William Rehnquist; John P. Stevens · Sandra Day O'Connor

Case opinions
- Majority: Marshall (parts I and II), joined by Brennan, Blackmun, Powell, Stevens
- Plurality: Marshall (parts III, IV and V), joined by Brennan, Blackmun, Stevens
- Concurrence: Powell (in part and in judgment)
- Concur/dissent: O'Connor, joined by White
- Dissent: Rehnquist, joined by Burger

Laws applied
- U.S. Const. amends. VIII, XIV

Ford v. Wainwright, 477 U.S. 399 (1986), is a landmark U.S. Supreme Court case that upheld the common law rule that the insane cannot be executed; therefore the petitioner is entitled to a competency evaluation and to an evidentiary hearing in court on the question of their competency to be executed.

== Background ==
Alvin Bernard Ford was convicted of first degree murder in 1974 and sentenced to death in Florida. On July 21, 1974, Ford shot and killed Officer Walter Ilyankoff during a Red Lobster restaurant robbery in Fort Lauderdale. One of his co-defendants, Alvin Lewis, pleaded guilty to second degree murder and was sentenced to life. In 1982, while on death row, Ford's mental health diminished to a point resembling paranoid schizophrenia. Ford began referring to himself as Pope John Paul III and reported such accomplishments as thwarting a vast Ku Klux Klan conspiracy to bury dead prisoners inside the prison walls, foiling an attempt by prison guards to torture his female relatives inside the prison, and personally appointing nine new justices to the Florida Supreme Court. Ford also claimed he was "free to go whenever [he] wanted" because he theorized that anyone who executed him would, in turn, be executed.

A panel of three psychiatrists was eventually called to examine Ford's behavior, and it concluded that while Ford had psychosis and various mental disorders, he was still capable of understanding the nature of the death penalty and the effect that such a penalty would have on him. Florida Governor Bob Graham acted without further comment on the panel's findings but in accord with a Florida statute in signing a death warrant for Ford in 1984. Ford sued the secretary of the Florida Department of Corrections, Louie L. Wainwright.

== Opinion ==
The Court, in an opinion by Justice Marshall, reviewed the evolving standards of the Eighth Amendment to be those consistent with "the progress of a maturing society", therefore not tolerant of acts traditionally considered "savage and inhumane", as the execution of the mentally insane was in early English and American common law. The Court reasoned that executing the insane did not serve any penological goals and that Florida's procedures for determining competency were inadequate. Thus, the Court made a preliminary finding that the Eighth Amendment bars states from inflicting capital punishment upon insane persons.

The Court then further addressed the procedural issues present in making a determination of insanity for Eighth Amendment concerns. The court found that such a determination could not be left solely to the executive branch, as was done via the Florida Statute allowing then-Governor Graham to sign Ford's death warrant solely on recommendation by an appointed committee of psychiatrists. Rather, the Court held that a proper judicial hearing, in which full procedural rights would be afforded, including the right to counsel and to cross-examine witnesses, was necessary for such a finding.

In their dissents, Justices O'Connor and White claimed that execution of the insane was not per se unconstitutional. The Justices further commented, however, that states had a right to create certain protected liberties in state statutes, of which a prohibition on the execution of the insane was a liberty which could be validly created. Once validly created by a state, that liberty required the minimum due-process protections afforded to other constitutionally protected liberties, which sole action by the executive branch, as in this case, would still fail to provide.

Justice Rehnquist, in dissent, stated a belief that in common-law tradition, it was actually the executive branch that was the sole arbiter of decisions involving the sanity of prisoners sentenced to death. In this respect, Justice Rehnquist felt that the majority had formed its opinion at the "expense of 'our common law heritage'".

The inmate was transferred to Florida State Hospital for treatment after he was reevaluated and found to be incompetent to be executed.

In 1989, a federal district judge ruled that Ford was sane, but defense lawyers appealed that ruling.

The appeal was pending when Ford died of a respiratory illness on February 6, 1991, at 37.

== See also ==
- Panetti v. Quarterman (2007)
- Penry v. Lynaugh (1989)
- List of criminal competencies
- List of United States Supreme Court cases, volume 477
- List of United States Supreme Court cases
- Lists of United States Supreme Court cases by volume
- List of United States Supreme Court cases by the Rehnquist Court
