= Thomas Wayne Crump =

American serial killer

- Mugshot
- Born: 1940; Muncie, Indiana, U.S.
- Died: June 14, 2018 (aged 77–78); Northern Nevada Correctional Center, Carson City, Nevada, U.S.
- Convictions: New Mexico; First degree murder (3 counts); Attempted murder Robbery; Nevada; First degree murder with a deadly weapon Robbery with a deadly weapon
- Penalty: New Mexico; Life imprisonment Nevada; Death

Details
- Victims: 4–7
- Span of crimes: July 13, 1980 – June 17, 1982
- Country: United States
- States: New Mexico, Nevada
- Date apprehended: November 16, 1980

Thomas Wayne Crump (1940 – June 14, 2018) was an American serial killer who committed three murders in the states of New Mexico and Nevada between July and October 1980. He was convicted of these crimes the following year and sentenced to life imprisonment, but he escaped from prison just two years later and killed a fourth victim. He was later sentenced to death in Nevada but died while awaiting execution.

== Early life ==
Thomas Wayne Crump was born in 1940 in Muncie, Indiana. In his teenage years, Crump teamed up with fellow teens Larry Morris and William Wagner, and formed a habit with them of stealing cars during the mid-1950s. In 1958, Crump was charged in his first serious crime, that of attempting to kill a woman who had a dispute with his mother in the past. A year later, Crump was accused of stealing four separate cars during the span of 48 hours. Crump avoided prison time for all of these offenses.

In 1960, Crump and another man attempted to rob a man in the public bathroom of a hotel building. He narrowly avoided jail time and instead pleaded guilty to a misdemeanor count of larceny. Later that same year, Crump was convicted of burglary, and landed himself a suspended jail sentence. In May 1961, Crump and another man were accused of kidnapping a man and forcing him into their car, before pushing him out while the vehicle was going 40 mph. However Crump told a different story, that the man had gone in willingly and suddenly jumped out, and Crump and the man were not convicted of any crime in that case. The following year, in February 1962 Crump and two accomplices lured a 54-year-old man they had met at a bar to a rural area and robbed him of $82.70. They were later arrested, and Justice Ralph Rector cited that due to Crump's habit of avoiding prosecution for his crimes, he had no choice but to sentence him to serve 1 to 5 years in prison. In 1963, Crump and his cellmate Robert Lindsey made a plan to escape from the Indiana State Reformatory, but ultimately gave up on the idea.

By 1966, Crump was a free man and had fathered a young boy. That year Crump was accused of robbing a hotel clerk. While in police custody he allegedly confessed to the crimes but refused to sign a piece of paper that stated he did. Soon after, Crump left his native state and embarked to Albuquerque, New Mexico. On July 13, 1967, Crump robbed and attempted to kill a clerk. Afterward, he fled the state and arrived in Saranac, Michigan the following month. While there, he was thrown into a rage after a waitress in a tavern asked for his ID. Later that day, Crump stabbed the waitress 10 times, but she survived. Crump was convicted of attempted murder and sent to a Michigan prison.

== Serial killings ==
By 1976, Crump was back in Albuquerque and working as a construction worker. He later became the manager of a KFC. One of the employees working there was 16-year-old Rhonda Higdon, who took an immediate liking to Crump. She saw Crump as a mature, kind man, though she was unaware of his violent past. Despite the over two-decade age gap, the two got married and produced a child. However, due to problems with their relationship over the years, Rhonda filed for divorce on July 13, 1980.

In response, Crump wanted to meet Rhonda for the last time and take her out to eat. Rhonda obliged and the two met, with Rhonda getting into Crump's vehicle. Instead of taking her to eat, Crump drove her to the Rio Grande and ordered her out of the car. He then produced a 9mm Automatic and shot her five times, killing her. Crump then hid her body in a nearby ditch and drove off. Crump became the sole suspect in the case, but police could not locate him. On September 9, Crump was hitchhiking when a 58-year-old man driving a pickup truck offered him a ride, to which he obliged. However, once in the vehicle Crump brandished a knife and sliced the man's throat, and stole $600 from his wallet. He then stole his truck and voyaged to Nevada. The man he attacked miraculously survived. Crump arrived in Las Vegas not long after and found living space in a motel where he stayed with two other men.

On October 4, he invited 26-year-old Jodie Jameson, a known prostitute, over to his room. After having sex with her, according to Crump, he drowned her under the water in the bathtub, though an autopsy later showed she had been strangled. The day after Jameson's murder, Crump opened fire on his two roommates. They both survived. Four days later he returned to Albuquerque. That same day, 78-year-old Irving Plaisted, originally from Minnesota, asked Crump for directions. The man let Crump into his vehicle and drove him to the edge of the city, where Crump robbed and shot him in the chest, though Plaisted was still alive, so Crump shot him in the head, which killed him. Two days later Crump robbed a flower shop of $17,000 worth of items, and later pawned it off and received $750. By that time, Crump was wanted by investigators, since he was the sole suspect for the three murders and other crimes.

== Arrest, convictions and escape ==
On November 16, 1980, Crump got into a fight at a motel. Police were called and they arrested him. Since he was wanted for the murders, authorities pressed him and he confessed to committing the five-month crime spree. The following year, Crump was convicted of killing his wife Rhonda and was sentenced to life imprisonment. A few months later he was convicted of killing Plaisted and was again sentenced to life. While serving his sentence at the Penitentiary of New Mexico, Crump came up with a plan to escape which, for unknown reasons, failed. In 1981, Crump was one of many inmates to attack three prison guards, including 33-year-old Gerald Magee who was killed in the incident.

On June 17, 1982, Crump was making a pumpkin pie in the prison's kitchen while chained with a 10-inch shackle. He was able to escape the shackles due to unknown circumstances and later escaped from the prison itself. Crump stole a car and a gun and drove back to Albuquerque.

=== Murder of Ian Smith ===
Crump arrived in Albuquerque not long after and ditched the car. He waved down a cab being driven by 22-year-old Steve Hewitt, who stopped, and Crump jumped in and held him at gunpoint. He told the driver "I want you to know I'm Thomas Wayne Crump" before shooting him two times in the head. The bullets both bounced off his skull and Hewitt survived. Hours later Crump flagged down another cab, that being driven by 44-year-old Ian Smith. Crump attacked Smith who fought back. During their struggle Crump accidentally shot himself in his right shoulder, but was able to fight through it and also shoot Smith, killing him.

Crump staggered into a nearby motel and fell to the ground crying in pain. Motel staff called the police who arrived minutes later and arrested him. Nearby they found a taxi where a man appeared to be slumped over. When the officers tried to resuscitate him, they saw that he was already dead, from a gunshot. Crump was taken to an Albuquerque hospital where he was treated and later recovered.

== New convictions and imprisonment ==
In April of the following year, Crump pleaded guilty to murder and attempted murder, for which he was given a 62-year prison term for him to serve on top of his two life sentences. Afterwards Crump was extradited to Nevada because he still had to stand trial for a murder there, that of Jodie Jameson. During the trial there, jurors got to hear a videotaped confession of Crump admitting to killing Jameson due to him believing she was in cahoots with a career criminal. In the confession he stated that he "snapped", but denied feeling guilt about killing her.

"I snapped. I didn't have, nothin'. I told her she could take [the money] to hell with her. No crime of murder, of violence is justifiable, but in my estimation it was. She deserved what she got, I don't feel no remorse over it. I could have obtained my money without killing her. I just wanted to kill her. It's an eye for an eye. I premeditated. I knew I was going to kill her and I did."

Crump stated that he "deserved the death sentence". In May 1984, he was sentenced to death. While on death row, Crump confessed to killing a total of seven people during his lifetime, starting at age 16 with the murder of a priest. Crump was scheduled to be executed on November 14, 1986, but that was delayed. In 1992 Crump was accused of stabbing another death row inmate who survived the attack.

== Death ==
For the remainder of his life, Crump was housed on death row. 34 years after being sentenced to death, on June 22, 2018, the 78-year-old Crump died.

== See also ==
- List of homicides in Nevada
- List of serial killers in the United States
