= Tracy Petrocelli =

American convicted serial killer (born 1951)

- Born: 1951 (age 74–75); Nevada, U.S.
- Status: Incarcerated, awaiting re-sentencing in Nevada
- Convictions: Nevada; First-degree murder; Washington; First-degree murder; California; Second-degree murder
- Penalty: Nevada; Death (overturned); Washington; Life without parole; California; 15 years to life imprisonment

Details
- Victims: 3–8
- Date: 1981 – 1982
- Locations: California, Nevada, Washington
- Imprisoned at: Northern Nevada Correctional Center

Tracy Petrocelli (born 1951), alias John Sylvester Maida, is an American serial killer convicted of three murders in California, Nevada and Washington, which he committed between 1981 and 1982. In October 1981, Petrocelli committed his first murder by shooting his girlfriend, Melanie Barker, to death in Seattle, Washington, and a month later, in November 1981, Petrocelli killed his second victim Dennis Gibson, whose body was discovered in Odessa Canyon near Calico, California. In March 1982, in Reno, Nevada, Petrocelli robbed and murdered a car dealer named James Wilson.

After his arrest, Petrocelli was first charged in Washington and Nevada with the murders of Barker and Wilson. Petrocelli was convicted and sentenced to death in Nevada, as well as life imprisonment in Washington. Petrocelli was put on trial two decades later for the murder of Gibson in California, and sentenced to a second life sentence after pleading guilty. Petrocelli was suspected of killing several more victims, including a British man named Stephen Scane, who disappeared in early 1984 before his remains were discovered in Utah.

Petrocelli's death sentence was overturned upon appeal in 2017 by a federal appellate court. Although a second jury re-sentenced Petrocelli to death in 2019, the sentence was overturned again by the Nevada Supreme Court in 2021, and currently, Petrocelli remains incarcerated in Nevada while awaiting his second re-sentencing trial.

== Murders ==
Between 1981 and 1982, Tracy Petrocelli committed a confirmed total of three murders, one each in Washington, Nevada and California.

=== Melanie Barker ===
On October 25, 1981, in the state of Washington, Petrocelli committed the murder of his girlfriend, Melanie Barker, who was his first confirmed victim. Barker, 18, was a waitress at the Four Seasons Restauran in Des Moines, Iowa and died from "gunshot wounds to the head."

Five months prior to the murder, Petrocelli was convicted of kidnapping his 18-year-old girlfriend Melanie Barker after he pleaded guilty to the crime. The couple initially dated for two years from 1979 to 1981 after Petrocelli's second divorce, but they broke up due to Petrocelli's gambling addiction, and it drove Petrocelli to abduct Barker and forced her to go on a three-day drive with him before his arrest for the crime. As a result, Petrocelli was given a suspended sentence and also ordered to undergo a drug treatment program. However, Petrocelli did not complete the program and absconded twice. He first fled from a rehabilitation center to headed to Reno, Nevada, before he was arrested hours later and sent back to the center. Still, the same night when he returned to detention, Petrocelli escaped once again.

Eventually, in October 1981, outside a local restaurant in Seattle, where his girlfriend worked, Petrocelli shot and killed Barker, and he fled the state to California. Petrocelli was identified as the killer after the police found his fingerprints at the scene of the murder, and an autopsy report revealed that Barker was shot thrice in the head and died as a result. Witnesses testified that Barker ended her work shift for the day just shortly before the murder, and was seen running back to her workplace while being pursued by her attacker and later shot to death.

=== Dennis Gibson ===
On November 19, 1981, a month after he murdered Barker, Petrocelli committed his second murder in Calico, California.

The victim was 30-year-old Dennis Gibson. While the exact details of the killing were not known, it was speculated that Gibson first encountered Petrocelli while he was on a surfing vacation in Del Mar, California. Based on the evidence uncovered, Gibson was shot four times and killed by Petrocelli, and his body was later disposed of in Odessa Canyon near Calico. Gibson's body was found by a couple a day after his murder, but his identity was not established until May 4, 1984, when the police matched the victim's fingerprints to Gibson, who was only reported missing by his father just weeks before the identification of Gibson's remains.

The murder of Gibson remained unsolved for 24 years until 2005, when cold case investigations ultimately identified Petrocelli as the killer. The case was known to be one of the oldest cold cases to be cracked by the Cold Case Unit of the San Bernardino County Sheriff's Department.

=== James Wilson ===
After murdering Gibson, Petrocelli, who continued to keep a low profile while on the run, fled to Oklahoma and later to Reno, Nevada.

On March 29, 1982, Petrocelli, who wanted to purchase a four-wheeled truck to get through the snowy roads, approached 63-year-old used car dealer James Wilson, and Petrocelli was allowed to test drive a Volkswagen pickup truck, with Wilson accompanying him for the test drive. During the drive, however, Petrocelli robbed, shot and killed Wilson with a .22 semi-automatic pistol as they passed through Pyramid Highway, and disposed of the body inside a crevice. The truck was also abandoned as well.

After killing Wilson, Petrocelli sought help from a passing driver, claiming that his motorcycle broke down and he needed a ride. The unidentified driver thus drove Petrocelli to Sutcliffe, where he also got a ride to Sparks from a game warden, before he took a taxi to Reno and paid the taxi driver with a two-inch roll of bills.

The following day, the game warden and his partner went to the highway to search for Petrocelli's broken motorcycle, but instead, they found the abandoned pickup truck, which had bloodstains and bullet holes on the passenger side. The body of Wilson was subsequently found at the crevice where Petrocelli disposed of it. Autopsy results confirmed that Wilson died of gunshot wounds: the first wound was found on the neck, the second penetrated the heart and a third was inflicted on the back of the head by a close range firing distance of two to three inches.

=== Suspected victims ===
Apart from the three confirmed murders, Petrocelli was suspected to have killed several more victims. It was believed that Petrocelli killed a total of eight people across at least three states.

One of these suspected victims was 26-year-old Stephen Scane, a British citizen from Somerset who first moved to the United States to visit a friend in 1980 and settled in Wyoming in 1981 after he married an American woman. Scane was reported missing sometime in early 1984 after his family lost contact with him for three years since 1981. In August 1984, Scane's skeletal remains were discovered in a national forest park in Utah and later identified, but his death remained unsolved for the next 34 years until 2018, when cold case investigators concluded that the alleged killer was Petrocelli, who was suspected to have shot Scane to death. Several receipts linked to Scane's credit card were also found in Petrocelli's possession at the time of his arrest in April 1982. However, no charges were made due to insufficient evidence.

In December 2018, a coroner's inquest in England concluded that Scane died from an "unlawful killing" and further ruled that Petrocelli was the suspected perpetrator in Scane's death.

== Trials in Washington and Nevada ==
=== Arrest ===
Within a month after the murder of James Wilson, the authorities were able to connect Tracy Petrocelli as the possible killer through investigations into the murders of both Wilson and Melanie Barker, and Petrocelli was placed on the wanted list, with the Washington and Nevada police seeking his whereabouts.

On April 18, 1982, Petrocelli was arrested in Las Vegas, and as a result, he was first charged with the murder of Wilson. Petrocelli submitted a plea of innocence over the murder charge in May 1982.

=== Nevada ===
Petrocelli was first put on trial in Nevada for the murder of Wilson. His trial began at a local trial court in Washoe County on July 26, 1982, and jury selection commenced on the first day.

During the trial, the prosecution argued that Petrocelli, whom they described as a "killer on the run", had the motive to commit robbery and in turn killed Wilson. They alluded to the fact that Petrocelli claimed to have killed both Wilson and his girlfriend Melanie Barker by accident, which were similar excuses in both cases, which ended with the deaths of both victims by gunshot wounds. They further pointed out that Wilson died from a gunshot wound inflicted close range, yet Petrocelli claimed that Wilson was shot and killed after the gun went off during a struggle. The defence, on the other hand, argued that Petrocelli should be convicted of manslaughter and claimed that it was an accidental killing caused by an argument and dispute over the price of a car Petrocelli wanted to procure.

On August 6, 1982, the jury found Petrocelli guilty of armed robbery and first-degree murder. During the same week when Petrocelli was convicted of killing Wilson, the jury unanimously recommended the death penalty for Petrocelli, and formal sentencing was scheduled on September 8, 1982. The Washington state authorities announced that they would seek Petrocelli's extradition to Washington to face trial for his girlfriend's murder.

On September 8, 1982, Washoe District Judge Peter Breen formally sentenced Petrocelli to death by the gas chamber for the murder of James Wilson, plus 30 years' imprisonment for armed robbery. Petrocelli was the 15th person to be condemned to death row after the state's reinstatement of capital punishment since 1976.

=== Washington ===
After his conviction and death sentence in Nevada for murdering Wilson, Petrocelli faced a second trial for the murder of his girlfriend Melanie Barker. He was extradited to Washington in December 1982 to be charged and put on trial for Barker's murder.

By January 1983, Petrocelli stood trial at a local trial court in Washoe County for the first-degree murder of Barker, and he reportedly chose to be unrepresented by a lawyer during the proceedings. Lynne Iacono, director of a support group for families of murder victims, came to testify about a prison visit she made to converse with Petrocelli about the Barker murder case.

On February 2, 1983, the jury found Petrocelli guilty and convicted him of first-degree murder. Petrocelli's sentencing was scheduled to take place on March 2, 1983, and he faced the maximum possible sentence of life imprisonment for the murder.

On March 2, 1983, Petrocelli was sentenced to life without parole by Judge James McCutcheon, as well as a concurrent ten-year sentence for kidnapping and another five years (concurrent) for theft. The King County Prosecutor's Office stated that in the event that Petrocelli's death sentence was ever overturned or if he was released from Nevada state custody, he would be transferred to Washington to serve his life sentence.

== Trial in California ==
In 2005, 24 years after the murder of Dennis Gibson, the California authorities identified the murderer as Tracy Petrocelli, who by then served 23 years on Nevada's death row. Cold case investigations reached a breakthrough that year when a ballistics test revealed that a .22-caliber Ruger was used to shoot Gibson to death, and the same type of gun was also used to kill both James Wilson and Melanie Barker. Additionally, Petrocelli was also found in possession of Gibson's birth certificate and drivers license at the time of his arrest in April 1982.

In June 2008, more than 26 years after his killing spree, Tracy Petrocelli was charged with the murder of Dennis Gibson back in November 1981.

The following year, Petrocelli was extradited from Nevada to California to face trial for the murder of Gibson. On May 5, 2009, Petrocelli pleaded not guilty to the murder charge.

On May 29, 2009, Petrocelli reached a plea agreement with the prosecution, and agreed to plead guilty to second-degree murder in exchange for a sentence of 15 years to life. Additionally, Petrocelli also waived his right to appeal against his California murder convictions as part of the plea bargain. Petrocelli, who was detained at the West Valley Detention Center, was scheduled to return to Nevada to continue his detention on death row. Deputy District Attorney John Thomas expressed that given Petrocelli's existing death sentence in Nevada and his life sentence in Washington, he would not likely serve the life term he received in California unless he completed the previous two sentences in those states.

== Appeal process ==
=== First round of appeals ===
On January 4, 1985, the Nevada Supreme Court dismissed Tracy Petrocelli's direct appeal against his death sentence. Two months later, on March 20, 1985, the Nevada Supreme Court denied Petrocelli's application for a rehearing of his appeal.

On April 18, 1985, Petrocelli's death warrant was signed by Washoe District Judge Peter Breen, who set an execution date of July 1, 1985. However, the execution ultimately did not proceed as scheduled, and Petrocelli remained on death row since then.

In January 1988, Petrocelli lodged another appeal to the Nevada Supreme Court, seeking to have his death sentence reduced on the grounds of ineffective trial counsel.

Eventually, Petrocelli was scheduled to be put to death by lethal injection on August 29, 1988. However, on August 26, 1988, three days before the scheduled execution, U.S. District Judge Howard D. McKibben granted Petrocelli a stay of execution.

On December 23, 1993, Petrocelli's appeal was denied by the Nevada Supreme Court.

In October 1997, U.S. District Judge Howard McKibben rejected Petrocelli's appeal against his death sentence.

On March 8, 2001, the 9th U.S. Circuit Court of Appeals dismissed Petrocelli's appeal.

On July 26, 2007, the Nevada Supreme Court denied another appeal from Petrocelli.

=== First reversal of death sentence and re-sentencing ===
On July 6, 2017, the 9th U.S. Circuit Court of Appeals allowed Petrocelli's appeal and overturned his death sentence, ruling that Petrocelli's constitutional rights to a lawyer and against self-incrimination were violated when a psychiatric expert summoned by the prosecution testified during his penalty phase.

Two years later, on May 6, 2019, Petrocelli returned to court for his re-sentencing hearing. A new jury was assembled to hear his case.

During the hearing, Petrocelli implored the jury and court to re-sentence him to life without parole instead of the death penalty. Public defender Jaclyn Millsap stated that Petrocelli should be granted a reprieve since he was of old age and he maintained good conduct while in prison. The prosecution, on the other hand, continued to seek the death penalty against Petrocelli, bringing their focus on the other two murders of Melanie Barker and Dennis Gibson, and the impact of his crimes on the victims' families.

On May 16, 2019, the jury unanimously agreed to re-impose the death penalty for Petrocelli. For the next five years, Petrocelli remained the latest person to be sentenced to death in Nevada until October 2024, when 54-year-old Robert Brown was sentenced to death for murdering his girlfriend, 29-year-old Nichole Nick, back in 2012.

=== Second reversal of death sentence ===
On May 27, 2021, the Nevada Supreme Court overturned Petrocelli's death sentence after it found that the verdict forms contained a wording error, where the death penalty should be considered and imposed if "any mitigating circumstance or circumstances are not sufficient to outweigh the aggravating circumstance found." The court ruled that the error affected Petrocelli's substantial rights and he was entitled to another sentencing hearing.

As of October 2021, despite the reversal of his death sentence, Petrocelli remains listed as one of 64 prisoners on Nevada's death row.

As of 2026, Petrocelli remains incarcerated in the Northern Nevada Correctional Center while awaiting his second re-sentencing trial.

== Other developments ==
During his incarceration on death row at the Nevada State Prison, Tracy Petrocelli married his 26-year-old wife on December 6, 1988.

Two years after their marriage, in March 1990, Petrocelli's wife filed a lawsuit against the state of Nevada, requesting that she be allowed to have conjugal visits and bear a child with Petrocelli. At that time, Petrocelli already fathered two children from his previous two marriages. Petrocelli's wife stated that she and her husband hoped to have a child of their own, and that her husband's murder conviction should not have a retributive impact on the lives of their would-be children, and they were innocent of their father's crimes, and thus she asked for approval to bear a child with Petrocelli via artificial semination.

In May 1990, the case was brought forward to the U.S. Supreme Court for a review. In response to the lawsuit, James Wilson's son, one of his father's 14 children, stated that Petrocelli was a "madmam" and he did not deserve the right to have a child and pass down his genes, and rebutted that he and his siblings were deprived of their father, and his children in turn lost their grandfather. The case was eventually dropped by the couple before it went to trial.

== See also ==
- Capital punishment in Nevada
- List of death row inmates in the United States § Nevada
- List of serial killers in the United States
- List of homicides in Nevada
