= Lin Newborn =

American activist

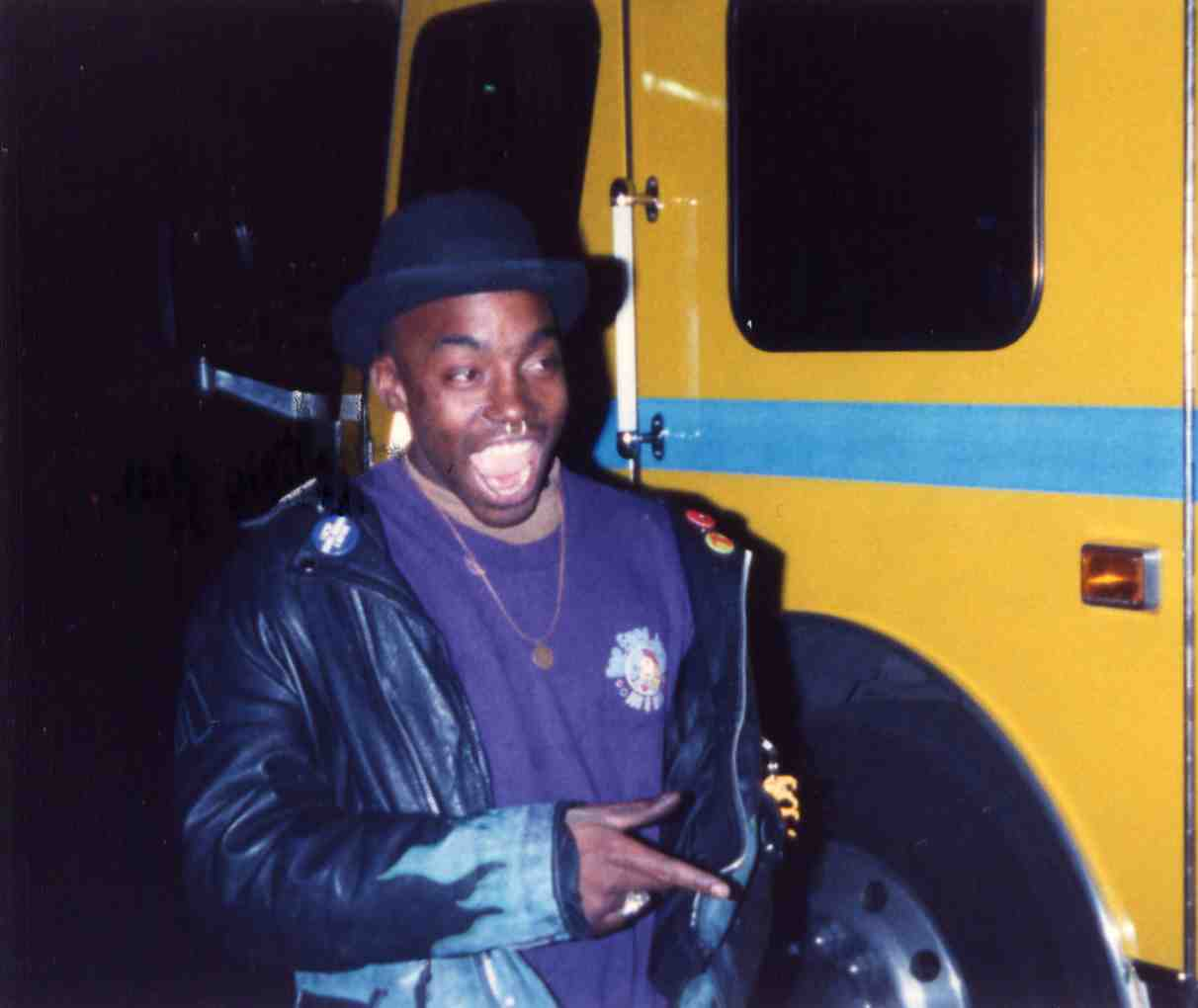
- Lin "Spit" Newborn in 1993
- Born: May 7, 1974; Pomona, California, U.S.
- Died: July 4, 1998 (aged 24); Las Vegas, Nevada, U.S.
- Occupation: Anti-racism activist
- Known for: Murdered by white supremacists alongside his friend, Daniel Shersty

Lin Newborn (May 7, 1974 – July 4, 1998) was an African-American anti-racist skinhead who was murdered by white supremacists in July 1998 alongside his friend, Daniel Shersty.

== Life ==
Newborn spent much of his adult life campaigning against racism. He specialized in de-programming young, newly recruited Nazi Skinheads, convincing them that they could be a part of a greater family that didn't discriminate against religion, ethnic background or sexual orientation. He taught that love and unity were stronger than hatred. A native of Pomona, California, he lived in Las Vegas, Nevada, where he was a member of the Las Vegas Unity Skins and sang in the band Counter Culture (a local Las Vegas punk band) and later in Life of Lies which ended around 1996.

== Murder ==
On July 4, 1998, white supremacists murdered Newborn at the age of 24 along with his friend, Daniel Shersty. On July 6, 1998, Newborn's body was found three miles west of U.S. Highway 95 near Rome Boulevard, within 150 yards (140 m) of Shersty's body. Police state that the victims were lured by two women, under the pretext of attending a party. Newborn and Shersty were taken to a northwest part of the valley, where they were beaten and possibly tortured before being shot to death. Police speculate that Newborn may have been trying to escape when he was killed.

== Trial and convictions ==
John "Polar Bear" Butler (then 26), a known neo-Nazi, was convicted of the murders and sentenced to death. He was allegedly the leader of a group called the Independent Nazi Skins. After appealing, Butler's death sentence was vacated and he was given four life terms without parole. He is registered with the Las Vegas Metropolitan Police Department's gang unit as a white supremacist. He is currently housed at High Desert State Prison in Nevada. In 2014, four other people, Melissa Hack, her brother Ross Hack, Ross's ex-girlfriend Mandie Abels, and Leland Jones were arrested for their involvement in the murders. They were tried in federal court since the crime had occurred on federal land. In 2012, Mandie Abels was sentenced to 15 years in prison after pleading guilty to conspiracy to commit murder and agreeing to testify against Ross and Jones. Melissa entered a similar plea agreement and also received a 15-year sentence in 2014. However, both Ross Hack and Leland Jones were acquitted at trial. Another suspect, Daniel Hartung, approached federal authorities in 2011 and confessed to his role in the murders out of remorse for his actions. He was killed in a car crash in Utah in April 2012.

== Poem ==
In a poem dated December 5, 1993, Newborn may have been predicting his own death. Language from the poem mirrors that of a threatening note found in Butler's stolen Jeep, which reads, in part ""'Do you know this punk ass SHARP named Spit [Newborn's moniker]? You pulled a gun on his bitch.'" The letter writer also wanted "this punk Spit to know that he can be reached out and touched."

The poem (which may be titled "Shell" because of the picture of a shell at the top with the word written in it), reads:

Shell -- IDYLL KYLLJOI SPITX

COME AND TOUCH ME,
GREAT FATHER....
DEATH!
Tis for you I Walk the Edge!
Tis for you I Cross the Line!
Tis for you Ive [sic] DIED Again.
Set me FREE FROM my hell
I don't want to FACE
you!
You are here...
but only for me now!
So now I've died!
Is this my hell?
Is this my hell?
Is this my hell?
The Fucking Angels ARE gone
I'm slane [sic] again
There's nothing here
Except
my shell, my shell, my shell
is sold to you Again
my shell is yours again,
touch me, but only to
SET ME FREE!
I can't be slane [sic] anymore!
I can't be yours anymore!

== See also ==
- List of homicides in Nevada
