= Eduardo Pérez (disambiguation) =

Eduardo Pérez (born 1969) is an American professional baseball player, coach, and current television color commentator

Eduardo Pérez may also refer to:

- Eduardo Pérez Bulnes (1785-1851), Argentine statesman
- Eduardo Perez (wrestler) (born 1948), Mexican professional wrestler
- Eddie Perez (politician) (born 1957), American politician
- Eduardo Pérez (swimmer) (born 1957), Mexican freestyle swimmer
- Eduardo Pérez Gonsalves (fl. 1960s-1970s), Spanish chess player
- Eddie Pérez (baseball) (born 1968), Venezuelan-American baseball catcher
- Eduardo Perez-Gonzalez (1979-2011), Mexican-American murderer
- Eduardo Pérez (footballer) (born 1993), Mexican footballer

== See also ==
- Eddie Perez (disambiguation)
