= List of killings by law enforcement officers in the United States, January 2010 =

This is a list of people reported killed by non-military law enforcement officers in the United States in January 2010, whether in the line of duty or not, and regardless of reason or method. The listing documents the occurrence of a death, making no implications regarding wrongdoing or justification on the part of the person killed or officer involved. Killings are arranged by date of the incident that caused death. Different death dates, if known, are noted in the description. The table below lists 32 people.

== January 2010 ==
Date	Name (Age) of Deceased	State (city)	Description
2010-01-29	Aaron Campbell (25)	Oregon (Portland)	The 25-year-old was shot and killed after he emerged from a Northeast Portland apartment where officers had been called to perform a welfare check on a suicidal, armed man. A grand jury cleared the officer of wrongdoing.
2010-01-29	Rocky Allen Watson	Florida (Lake Placid)	
2010-01-29	Michael Stringer (39)	Georgia (Spalding County)	
2010-01-23	Patrick Burns (50)	Illinois (Springfield)	Police responded to a report of a break-in at a home and encountered Burns. Officers tased him 15 times, leading to his death. His death was initially attributed to excited delirium, but it was reclassified as a homicide in 2023.
2010-01-21	Timothy Wall (46)	New Jersey (Newark)	Irvington police responded to a burglary at a local business, only to chase the burglar into Newark across rooftops and into a backyard. The suspect bit Officer Herne Lacoste, 38, and lunged for his gun; the officer shot him once in the shoulder, killing him. The victim was identified as Timothy Wall, 46.
2010-01-20	Maurice Evans Shavers, Jr. (21)	California (Oakland)	The incident began when Shavers and Alphonso Mitchell, 40, burst into the drugstore and herded several employees into a back room at gunpoint. Shavers burst out of a rear emergency door and opened fire on both officers, who fired back. One of the CHP officers was shot in the chest by Shavers, who ran from the CHP officers and was then shot dead by Oakland police.
2010-01-20	Dannie Young (27)	Florida (Lauderdale Lakes)	
2010-01-19	Donald Michael Humphries (57)	Washington (Sedro-Woolley)	Shot while approaching officer and pulling out a .45 caliber handgun. Officer was attempting to pull over Humphries for erratic driving. After a chase, Humphries got out of his car and approached officer.
2010-01-19	Zachary Mathes (22)	Florida (Sarasota)	
2010-01-15	Louis Kimbro (66)	Tennessee (Memphis)	Kimbro was shot to death when officers responded just before 9 p.m. to a call about an armed man with possible mental problems
2010-01-15	Derek McKinnon (21)	Georgia (Valdosta)	Shot after refusing to drop weapon while holding a hostage. Police were monitoring a home for a murder suspect for whom warrants had been issued. The person fled the house to another and took a woman hostage.
2010-01-15	Daniel Adams, SR. (25)	Nebraska (Omaha)	Adams made suicidal gestures with a gun before pointing the weapon at officers who then fatally shot him. Police said officers were flagged down by a woman who said she had just been robbed at gunpoint and that her brother was chasing the suspects. "At that time the officers also gave chase and then at some point the officers fired at the suspect." Adams allegedly pulled a gun and pointed it at Officer Chad Frodyma, who returned fire. Officer Zach Petrick heard the shot and abandoned his chase of the second suspect. He arrived and when Adams allegedly pointed his weapon in their direction again. Petrick also fired at Adams. "Adams was acting in a suicidal manner," said Omaha Police Chief Alex Hayes. "He pointed a gun at his own head, told the officer to shoot him. The officer was yelling commands at him to drop the firearm. Mr. Adams then took the firearm and pointed it at the officer.
2010-01-14	Louis Atkinson (30)	Georgia (Bibb County)	
2010-01-13	Kenneth Ellis III (25)	New Mexico (Albuquerque)	Officer Bret Lampiris-Tremba shot and killed Ellis outside a 7-Eleven after Ellis refused to drop the gun he was holding to his head. Ellis had recently returned from Iraq and suffered from PTSD. Ellis' family filed a wrongful death lawsuit against the city, and in March 2013, a judge ruled that the shooting violated his Fourth Amendment rights.
2010-01-09	Tremall Lavar Anderson (28)	Oklahoma (Oklahoma City)	Anderson (AKA Tremall Lavar Crandell) was driving a black coupe Saturday when he didn't stop for an officer who tried to pull him over. Anderson shot officer Kris Hunter at NE 23 and Martin Luther King Boulevard during the subsequent chase and was gunned down by officer Daniel Godsil when he got out of his car about two blocks away.
2010-01-09	Aaron Renfro (32)	New Mexico (Albuquerque)	APD officer Cook and others pulled over a vehicle for speeding. Officers asked the three men in the car, one of whom was Renfro, for their identifications, police said. Renfro gave a fake name. As it turned out, there was a local warrant out for the bogus name. When Cook and the other officers asked Renfro and the other men to get out of the vehicle, Renfro took off running, police said. When officers yelled at him to stop, Renfro reached into his waistband and pulled a gun, police said. Cook shot him an undetermined number of times.
2010-01-08	Unnamed man	Michigan (Detroit)	The man allegedly tried to break into the home of an off-duty police officer, who shot and killed him.
2010-01-06	Stewart Wolfe (39)	Indiana (Peru)	
2010-01-06	Altariq Hutchinson (23)	Pennsylvania (Philadelphia)	Hutchinson tried to carjack an off-duty officer, who shot and killed him.
2010-01-05	Thomas Waller (21)	Virginia (Danville)	
2010-01-05	Torey Breedlove (27)	Florida (Orlando)	
2010-01-04	Clifford McLean (24)	Florida (Pembroke Pines)	After setting his mother on fire, McLean robbed a home, stole a pickup truck, struck a number of vehicles, and ran a red light. He was shot by police while walking towards officers with his hands in his jacket pocket.
2010-01-04	Jorge Solis-Palma (28)	Arizona (Douglas)	Solis-Palma allegedly threw a rock at a border patrol agent, who shot and killed him.
2010-01-04	Prince Alim Bantu Akbar (32)	Illinois (Calumet City)	
2010-01-04	Anthony Del Castillo (47)	California (Santa Ana)	
2010-01-04	Johnny Lee Wicks(66)	Nevada (Las Vegas)	Wicks opened fire with a shotgun in a Las Vegas federal building, killing a security guard and wounding a U.S. marshal. Wicks, 66, was killed in a gunbattle with the marshals.
2010-01-03	George Ruby (61)	Ohio (Mount Orab)	Ruby shot at an officer who had previously arrested him for a driving under the influence (DUI) charge. Two officers returned fire, fatally wounding the suspect.
2010-01-02	Aaron Harvey (47)	Texas (Waco)	
2010-01-02	Raymond Thane Davis (36)	Montana (Hamilton)	Officer Jessop stopped Davis for a traffic violation. Jessop got out of his car, approached Davis’ vehicle. Davis pulled a gun and fired at the officer, Officer Jessop returned fire and hit Davis. Davis sped away but crashed nearby. He was pronounced dead at the scene.
2010-01-01	Tevita Fisiialia (22)	Utah (Murray)	
2010-01-01	Colby W. Eppard (18)	Virginia (Free Union)	Eppard swiped a Greene County deputy's vehicle by smashing the window with a rock after the officer left the car locked but running. Police say that he died after firing multiple shots at law enforcement officers who surrounded the vehicle on Route 20 in Free Union.
2010-01-01	Dennis Gene Cox	Colorado (Fort Collins)	Shot with handgun in hand when moved to point gun at officers. Police had approached Cox as a suspect wanted by the FBI for suspicion of involvement in a kidnapping and assault.

== See also ==
- Death in custody § United States
- Henry A. Wallace Police Crime Public Database
- List of cases of police brutality
- List of countries with annual rates and counts for killings by law enforcement officers
- List of law enforcement officers killed in the line of duty in the United States
- List of law enforcement officers convicted for an on-duty killing in the United States
- List of shootings by US immigration agents
- List of police reforms related to the George Floyd protests
- List of unarmed African Americans killed by law enforcement officers in the United States
- Lists of killings by law enforcement officers
- Police brutality in the United States
- Police misconduct § United States
- Police riot § United States
- Police use of deadly force in the United States
