= Nathaniel Burkett =

American serial killer

- Mug shot
- Born: 1946; Picayune, Mississippi, U.S.
- Died: January 19, 2021 (aged 74); Northern Nevada Correctional Center, Nevada, U.S.
- Other name: "Criptoe"
- Convictions: Mississippi; Manslaughter; Nevada; Second degree murder (2 counts); Voluntary manslaughter
- Penalty: Mississippi; 20 years imprisonment Nevada; 10 years to life in prison

Details
- Victims: 5–6+
- Span of crimes: 1978–2002
- Country: United States
- States: Mississippi; Nevada
- Date apprehended: For the final time in July 2012

Nathaniel Burkett (1946 – January 19, 2021) was an American serial killer who murdered four women in the Las Vegas Valley and his own mother in Mississippi between 1978 and 2002. Convicted of several crimes throughout his life, his exposure as a serial killer came in 2012 through DNA testing. He was convicted of three counts of murder in 2018 and died in prison in 2021.

== Early life ==
Nathaniel Burkett was born in 1946 in Picayune, Mississippi. His exact date of birth is not known as he used several different birthdays throughout his life. Burkett spoke little about his childhood, other than that he suffered from polio, which later caused him to walk with a limp; due to this, as an adult, he garnered the nickname "Criptoe". From 1965 until his arrest, Burkett resided between Mississippi and Las Vegas, Nevada.

== Murders ==
Between 1976 and 1979, Burkett racked up numerous arrests that consisted of battery, domestic violence, kidnapping, robbery, disorderly conduct, and rape.

In April 1978, Burkett sexually assaulted and strangled 22-year-old Barbara Ann Cox to death in Las Vegas. He discarded her nude body between a parking stall and a wall at 211 W. Wilson Ave, close to where he was living at the time. Cox's body was found on April 22 by Burkett's girlfriend. Shortly thereafter, police located Burkett, who was intoxicated and carrying a bottle of whiskey near the crime scene. He was reportedly displeasing to police and frequently blurted out that he did not have anything to do with the murder. He was found unfit to be interrogated and brought back to his apartment, where he passed out. Since there was no evidence to officially tie Burkett to Cox's murder, he was not charged or questioned again.

Burkett later moved back to Mississippi, where, on April 13, 1982, he doused his mother, Ruby, with gasoline and burned her to death. He was arrested and indicted on a capital murder charge by a Pearl River County grand jury. That charge was later downgraded to manslaughter. Burkett was found guilty and sentenced to 20 years in prison in 1983.

In 1992, Burkett was released from prison and moved back to Las Vegas shortly after. On February 20, 1994, Burkett raped and strangled 27-year-old Tina Gayle Mitchell less than a mile away from where he had murdered Cox 15 years earlier. He attempted to hide the body under a pile of towels, but it was eventually found by a passerby. On May 14, 1994, Burkett murdered 32-year-old Althea Williams, later hiding her body under a clothesline near where he had killed Mitchell.

Twice, in 1997 and 1998, Burkett was arrested for failing to register as a felon and to change his address. On August 19, 1999, 33-year-old Brigitte Mitchell Thomas went missing in Las Vegas. Burkett has been considered a prime suspect in this case. On September 4, 2002, Burkett lured 41-year-old Valetter Jean Bousley behind a church in Las Vegas and attacked her, ultimately strangling her to death. A witness to the crime came forward in March 2003, saying that he had witnessed the abduction. The witness, who was in jail, described how he saw Bousley follow Burkett behind the church. Then, ten minutes later, he saw Burkett walk away alone.

Police uncovered further evidence that implicated Burkett in the murder. He was arrested in October of that year, convicted of voluntary manslaughter, and served six years in prison. In 2004, Burkett was required to submit a sample of his DNA so it could be stored on file. In 2009, Burkett, then in his early 60s, was released from prison and began to live a quiet life, residing in his native Mississippi until his final arrest.

== Investigation ==
In 2009, after being granted nearly $500,000 by the U.S. Department of Justice, Las Vegas Metro Police began to run DNA tests in national databases to locate perpetrators of unsolved murders. In 2010, the sister of Barbara Ann Cox made a call to Metro Police's Cold Case Team, pleading for them to review the unsolved case. In 2011, following a forensic examination, the Cox murder and the 1994 murder of Tina Mitchell were linked. Following the breakthrough, police began looking for potential suspects, and Burkett was located. His 2004 DNA sample was compared to the cases and was matched to the samples found at the murder scenes. Following this, Burkett was arrested in Mississippi in July 2012 and extradited back to Nevada to face murder charges.

== Aftermath ==
Once arraigned on two counts of first-degree murder and later indicted on a third count related to the May 1994 murder of Althea Williams, Burkett pleaded not guilty. Las Vegas prosecutors sought a death sentence. They later withdrew that possibility after learning Burkett was in the early stages of dementia. In 2018, Burkett pleaded guilty to two counts of second-degree murder and was sentenced to 10 years to life in prison.

== Death ==
On January 19, 2021, Burkett died of complications from COVID-19 while imprisoned at Northern Nevada Correctional Center.

== See also ==
- List of homicides in Nevada
- List of serial killers in the United States
