= 2019 Nevada killing spree =

Series of murders in Nevada, United States

- Location: Douglas and Washoe Counties, Nevada, United States
- Date: January 10–16, 2019
- Attack type: Spree killing
- Weapon: Firearm
- Deaths: 4
- Perpetrator: Wilber Ernesto Martinez-Guzman
- Motive: Robbery

The 2019 Nevada killing spree was a series of murders in January 2019 in which an assailant broke into three homes in Douglas and Washoe Counties in northwestern Nevada, murdered the elderly inhabitants, and made off with valuables. Reports of the crimes terrified area residents for several days until a police manhunt identified and apprehended Wilber Ernesto Martinez-Guzman. The sheriff's report states that Martinez-Guzman later confessed.

== Killings ==
A region-wide manhunt began after Connie Koontz, age 56, was found dead in her Gardnerville home on January 10, 2019. Sophia Renken, 74, was found shot to death in her home in Gardnerville on January 13. Gerald and Sharon David, 81 and 80 respectively, were found dead in their home in Washoe Valley, which is south of Reno, on January 16.

The manhunt continued for nine days. Information obtained through tracking an Apple Watch, which had been stolen from Koontz, led to a Carson City woman who had attempted to connect a digital account to the watch; her son Wilber Ernesto Martinez-Guzman was arrested and charged with the murders. The following day, jewelry belonging to Koontz and a ring belonging to Gerald David were found at a Carson City pawn shop.

== Perpetrator ==
Law enforcement had Wilber Ernesto Martinez-Guzman under surveillance as they investigated the string of murder-robberies. During the investigation and surveillance an Immigration and Customs Enforcement deportation officer, who worked regularly with the Tri-County Gang Unit, developed probable cause to arrest Martinez-Guzman on several immigration-related criminal charges. A team of law enforcement officers from the Carson City, Douglas and Lyon County Sheriff's Departments, and Immigration and Customs Enforcement deportation officers arrested Martinez-Guzman. He was arrested in Carson City, Nevada, on January 19, 2019, initially by ICE on immigration charges, and brought to the Carson City Sheriff's Department. While in temporary holding at the Carson City Sheriff's Department, Martinez-Guzman was read his rights, waived his rights, and interviewed. During the interview it is stated that he confessed to all four murders, as well as a string of other crimes. Based on this, and evidence obtained from a search warrant of his vehicle, Martinez-Guzman was then arrested by the Carson City Sheriff's Department and booked into the Carson City Jail on nearly 30 felonies.

Martinez-Guzman, then 19 years old, was living in Carson City for approximately a year and a half. He is a citizen and national of El Salvador who entered the United States by illegally crossing the US/Mexico border several years earlier.

== Legal proceedings ==
Following the killings, Martinez-Guzman was detained on an immigration hold. According to immigration officials, Martinez-Guzman "was likely in the United States illegally and was detainable." according to a spokeswoman for U.S. Immigration and Customs Enforcement, “If he's released from jail, law enforcement will contact us, and we will pick him up and we will start the proceedings for his deportation.”

Martinez-Guzman currently has his trial set on all four murder charges in Washoe County for late 2021.

Martinez-Guzman appeared in court on January 23, 2019, where he was charged with possession of stolen property, burglary, and obtaining money under false pretenses.

In February 2019, Martinez-Guzman waived his right to a preliminary hearing and a judge approved his transfer to Washoe County where he is held without bail to face prosecution for four murders. Prosecution in Carson City for 26 burglary and possession charges was placed on hold.

Martinez-Guzman's trial was scheduled for April 2020, and was later delayed to August 31, 2020, and was later delayed again to September 20, 2021. Prior to Martinez-Guzman's guilty pleas, prosecutors planned to seek a death penalty for the suspect.

At a hearing before a grand jury in March 2019, a detective stated that Guzman had told police that he robbed and killed his victims because he needed money to buy meth.

On October 21, 2021, Martinez-Guzman pled guilty to the murders of Gerald and Sharon David.

On November 9, 2021, Martinez-Guzman pled guilty to the murders of Connie Koontz and Sophia Renken.

On February 28, 2022, Martinez-Guzman was sentenced to two consecutive life sentences without the possibility of parole, an additional 36 to 90 years in prison and $40,000 in fines for the crimes against Gerald and Sharon David.

On March 3, 2022, Martinez-Guzman was sentenced to two life sentences without the possibility of parole for the murders of Connie Koontz and Sophia Renken.

== Reaction ==
On January 21, 2019, President Donald Trump tweeted, "Four people in Nevada viciously robbed and killed by an illegal immigrant who should not have been in our Country. 26 people killed on the Border in a drug and gang related fight. Two large Caravans from Honduras broke into Mexico and are headed our way. We need a powerful Wall!" Three close family members of Sharon and Gerald David were invited to Washington, D.C. to attend the 2019 State of the Union Address.

== See also ==
- List of homicides in Nevada
- Illegal immigration to the United States and crime
