= Eddie Perez =

Eddie Perez may refer to:

- Eddie Perez (stunt coordinator), director, stunt coordinator and actor
- Eddie Perez (politician) (born 1957), former mayor of Hartford, Connecticut
- Eddie Pérez (baseball) (born 1968), former Major League Baseball catcher
- Eduardo Pérez (born 1969), former Major League Baseball first baseman
- Eddie Perez (guitarist) (born 1968), guitarist of the country band The Mavericks
- Eddie "La Bala" Perez, saxophonist with El Gran Combo de Puerto Rico

== See also ==
- Eduardo Pérez (disambiguation)
