= List of homicides in Nevada =

This is a list of homicides in Nevada. It includes notable homicides committed in the U.S. state of Nevada that have a Wikipedia article on the killing, the killer, or the victim.

The list is divided into three sub-lists as follows:

1. Multiple homicides – homicides having multiple victims, including the worst mass shooting in American history (2017 Las Vegas shooting) and the 1981 Hilton arson

2. Serial killers – persons who murder three or more persons with the incidents taking place over more than a month and including a significant period of time between them

3. Individual homicides – notable homicides involving a single fatality, including the murder of Tupac Shakur and the murder of casino executive Ted Binion

This article also does not include all people who have been executed in Nevada. Such persons are listed separately at List of people executed in Nevada.

== Multiple homicides ==
Listed in chronological order

Incident	Location	Date	Deaths	Description	Sources
Queho	Nevada	Early 20th century	Unknown	Native American alleged to be the first mass murderer in Nevada history	
Orbit Inn bombing	Las Vegas	1967-01-07	5	Richard James Paris detonates a bomb at the Orbit Inn killing himself, his wife, and four other people. One of the deadliest explosions in Las Vegas Valley’s history.	
1981 Hilton arson	Las Vegas	1981-02-10	8	Busboy under influence of drugs set fire to a curtain in an elevator lobby on eighth floor, 350 injured and eight killed in fire	
Lin Newborn/Daniel Shersty	Las Vegas	1998-07-04	2	Two men killed by white supremacist in remote desert location outside Las Vegas	
Zane Floyd	Las Vegas	1999-06-03	4	Mass shooting at Albertson's supermarket	
Las Vegas courthouse shooting	Las Vegas	2010-01-04	2	Mass shooting at federal courthouse lobby by man disgruntled by cuts to his Social Security benefits	
Carson City IHOP shooting	Carson City	2011-09-06	5	Mass shooting at IHOP restaurant	
2013 Las Vegas Strip shooting and crash	Sparks	2013-02-21	3	Fatal shooting of aspiring rapper Kenneth Cherry Jr., and a subsequent crash that killed a taxi driver and his passenger.	
2013 Sparks Middle School shooting	Sparks	2013-10-21	2	Shooting by 12-year-old at middle school; victims included teacher Michael Landsberry	
2014 Las Vegas shootings	Las Vegas	2014-06-08	5	Shooting at a restaurant and Walmart by married couple with extreme anti-government views	
2017 Las Vegas shooting	Las Vegas	2017-10-01	60	Mass shooting from 32nd floor of Mandalay Bay hotel into crowd attending music festival	
2019 Nevada killing spree	Douglas, Washoe Counties	2019-01	4	Murder-robbery spree by Salvadoran immigrant at three homes of elderly inhabitants	
2020 Henderson shooting	Henderson	2020-11-03	4	Mass shooting at apartment building	
2023 University of Nevada, Las Vegas shooting	Las Vegas	2023-12-06	3	Mass shooting at Frank and Estella Beam Hall on UNLV campus; shooter was unsuccessful applicant for professorship	

== Serial killers ==
Listed in chronological order

Incident	Location	Date	Deaths	Description	Sources
Carroll Cole	California, Nevada, Texas	1947–1980	16–35	Serial killer who was executed in 1985 for killing at least 15 women and one boy by strangulation	
Nathaniel Burkett	Mississippi, Nevada	1978–2002	5–6+	Murdered four women in close proximity to his Las Vegas apartment	
Terry Childs	Nevada, California	1979–1985	5–12	Jobless drug addict who claimed he was pressured into confessing after seeing the ghosts of the people he had killed	
Thomas Wayne Crump	Nevada, New Mexico	1980	4–7		
Tracy Petrocelli	Washington, Nevada, California	1981–1982	3+	Murder of at least three people across three states, including a used car dealer in Nevada	
Great Basin Murders	Wyoming, Utah, Nevada, Idaho	1983–1997	4+	Murders of at least nine women	
Daryl Mack	Reno	1988, 1994	2		
Brookey Lee West	Las Vegas	1993–1998	1–3	Convicted of murdering her mother; also suspected in murder of her brother and husband	
David Stephen Middleton	Sparks, Verdi	1994–1995	2–3+	Former Miami police officer and suspected serial killer	
Tony Ray Amati	Las Vegas	1996	3	Shot and killed three people during series of "thrill-killings" in Las Vegas	

== Single homicides ==
Listed by date

Incident	Location	Date	Description	Sources
Julia Bulette	Virginia City	1867-01-19/20	Prostitute strangled and bludgeoned by French drifter; killer's hanging attended by Mark Twain	
John Gregovich, Andriza Mircovich	Tonopah	1912-05-14	State senator Gregovich murdered by Mircovich; Mircovich was executed in 1914 with an automated shooting machine	
Jarbidge Stage Robbery	Jarbidge	1916-12-05	The last mail stagecoach robbery in the U.S. and the first conviction based on a bloody palm print (driver killed)	
Sonja McCaskie	Reno	1963-04-05	British Olympic skier raped, murdered, and dismembered by 18-year-old high school student	
Oscar Bonavena	Reno	1976-05-22	Argentine heavyweight boxer shot at Mustang Ranch by security guard during a conflict with the owner	
Al Bramlet	Las Vegas	1977-02-24	Labor leader kidnapped from Las Vegas airport, body discovered in the desert with six bullet wounds	
Jesse Bishop	Las Vegas	1977-12	Convicted of the murder of David Ballard during a robbery at a Las Vegas Strip casino; executed in the gas chamber in 1979	
Murder of Gwenn Story	Las Vegas	1979-08-14	Unidentified woman discovered dead in Sahara Hotel parking lot with multiple stab wounds in abdomen	
Murder of Tammy Terrell	Henderson	1981-10-05	Unsolved murder of 17-year-old girl by blunt-force trauma; body identified 40 years later in 2021	
Tommy Turk	Las Vegas	1981-08-04	Jazz musician shot in the head with shotgun during liquor store holdup	
Murder of Mary Silvani	Washoe County	1982-07-17	Woman found shot to death, identified in 2019 with DNA	
Cornell Gunter	Las Vegas	1990-02-26	R&B singer inducted into Rock and Roll Hall of Fame as a member of The Coasters was shot and killed in his car	
Murder of Tupac Shakur	Las Vegas	1996-09-13	Rapper killed in drive-by-shooting	
Herbert Blitzstein	Las Vegas	1997-01-6	Loanshark and bookmaker shot in head at his home	
Chris Trickle	Las Vegas	1998-03-25	Stock car race drive killed in drive-by shooting	
Jeremy Strohmeyer	Primm	1998-05-25	Convicted of sexual assault and murder of 7-year-old Sherrice Iverson at Primadonna Resort	
Ted Binion	Las Vegas	1998-09-17	Gambling executive, death by drug overdose ruled homicide	
Jay R. Smith	Las Vegas	2002-10-05	Former child actor from Our Gang short film series discovered dead at age 87 in desert outside Las Vegas with multiple stab wounds; homeless man convicted	
Darren Mack	Reno	2006-06-12	Pled guilty to murdering his wife, Charla Mack, during divorce proceedings; also convicted of shooting of family court judge Chuck Weller the same day	
Kathy Augustine	Reno	2006-07-11	Member of Nevada Assembly killed with drugs by her fourth husband	
Murder of Brianna Denison	Reno	2008-01-20	19-year-old college student visiting Reno from Santa Barbara, California, raped and strangled by James Biela	
Rhoshii Wells	Las Vegas	2008-08-11	Boxer and Olympic medalist shot and killed	
Murder of Alyssa Otremba	Las Vegas	2011-09-02	15-year-old high school freshman who was kidnapped, raped and murdered by Javier Righetti, who was sentenced to death in 2017.	
Jeff German	Las Vegas Valley	2022-09-02	Investigative reporter stabbed to death; elected official about whom German had reported is accused of the murder	
