= Daniel Shersty =

American activist (1977–1998)

- Born: Daniel Christopher Shersty; August 8, 1977; Florida, U.S.
- Died: July 4, 1998 (aged 20); Las Vegas, Nevada, U.S.
- Military career
- Allegiance: United States
- Branch: United States Air Force
- Rank: Airman first class
- Known for: Murdered by white supremacists alongside his friend, Lin Newborn

Airman 1st Class Daniel Shersty (August 8, 1977 – July 4, 1998) was a United States Air Force serviceman who was murdered along with his friend Lin Newborn for involvement in the anti-racist skinhead movement.

== Early life ==
Daniel Christopher Shersty was born in Florida and lived there for most of his life. His parents had separated by the time he was three years old and Daniel moved to New Milford, Connecticut, with his father, Walter and his stepmother, Sharon Arndt before returning to Florida. Shersty was a shy but well-liked member of his school communities and took part in activities such as school plays and the marching band. His IQ was tested in his Junior year of high school and while his score was in the top two percent for his age, his family's financial situation meant that Shersty was unable to pay for college. As a result, he decided to join the Air Force to allow him to fund his future studies.

== Move to Las Vegas ==
Shersty moved to Las Vegas to take up his post at Nellis Air Force Base. It was here that Shersty befriended Lin Newborn, a prominent Las Vegas anti-racist activist, and became deeply involved in the area's vibrant anti-racist skinhead scene. “He didn't hang out on base a lot—he hung out on the scene in Vegas a lot," according to friends. "He made friends in the local punk, skateboard, and snowboard community. Many of these people were also part of a group known as the Las Vegas Unity Skins.

== The murders ==
Shersty and Newborn were shot to death in a remote desert location outside of Las Vegas, at Powerline Road and Centennial Parkway. They had been lured under pretense of a party and dates by the murderer John Butler's fiancée, Melissa Hack, and another woman, Mandie Abels, on the night of July 3, 1998. The women met Lin Newborn while having a piercing at Tribal Body Piercing, where Newborn worked and where Shersty had been visiting him. After the men accepted the invitation, the women mentioned that the route to the party was difficult and suggested they meet near an exit of US Highway 95 so the two men could follow them. The ambush came after midnight; Nazis said on their websites that it was right for a race traitor to die on Independence Day. From the footprints, police believe Lin was grabbed first. Dan threw himself forward to protect his friend. He died as the killers dragged Lin away.

On the morning of July 4, a group of people on recreational ATV rides through the desert spotted a body. Police responded to a call about bodies that had been spotted in the desert, and found Shersty’s remains. He had been badly beaten but the cause of death was a gunshot wound to the side and face. On July 6, 1998, police found Newborn's body about 150 yards from where Shersty had been found. He had been shot repeatedly. Ten days after his body was discovered police recovered a .32 caliber handgun from murder suspect John “Polar Bear” Butler that was determined to be the one used to kill Shersty, but the gun was not tied to Newborn's murder. While several suspects, including Butler's fiancée Melissa Hack and her brother Ross, were pursued by police and prosecutors, only Butler has ever been convicted of Shersty and Newborn's murders.

== Aftermath ==
Nellis Air Force Base in Las Vegas, Dan's post, broke with military protocol by inviting Shersty's civilian friends to its memorial service. At a candlelight vigil near the base chapel, airmen read the company roll call.

John "Polar Bear" Butler (then 26), a known neo-Nazi, was convicted of the murders and sentenced to death. He was allegedly the leader of a group called the Independent Nazi Skins. After appealing, Butler's death sentence was vacated and he was given four life terms without parole by a jury. The Nevada Supreme Court rejected the appeal of John “Polar Bear” Butler in February 2010. He is registered with the Las Vegas Metropolitan Police Department's gang unit as a white supremacist. He is currently housed at High Desert State Prison in Nevada.

In 2014, four other people, Melissa Hack, her brother Ross Hack, Ross's ex-girlfriend Mandie Abels, and Leland Jones were arrested for their involvement in the murders. They were tried in federal court since the crime had occurred on federal land. In 2012, Mandie Abels was sentenced to 15 years in prison after pleading guilty to conspiracy to commit murder and agreeing to testify against Ross and Jones. Melissa entered a similar plea agreement and also received a 15-year sentence in 2014. However, both Ross Hack and Leland Jones were acquitted at trial. Another suspect, Daniel Hartung, approached federal authorities in 2011 and confessed to his role in the murders out of remorse for his actions. He was killed in a car crash in Utah in April 2012.

== See also ==
- List of homicides in Nevada
