= Zane Floyd =

American mass murderer

- Mugshot of Zane Floyd
- Born: Zane Michael Floyd; September 20, 1975 (age 51); Estes Park, Colorado, U.S.
- Education: Faith Lutheran Middle School & High School
- Convictions: First degree murder with a deadly weapon (4 counts); Attempted murder with a deadly weapon First degree kidnapping with a deadly weapon Sexual assault with a deadly weapon (4 counts); Burglary while in possession of a firearm
- Penalty: Death

Details
- Date: June 3, 1999
- Locations: Las Vegas, Nevada
- Killed: 4
- Injured: 1
- Weapon: Mossberg 500 Cruiser 12-gauge 8-shot pump-action shotgun
- Imprisoned at: High Desert State Prison

Zane Michael Floyd (born September 20, 1975) is an American convicted mass murderer who was sentenced to death for the 1999 shooting at a supermarket in Las Vegas, Nevada, in which he killed four people and injured a fifth. Floyd also sexually assaulted a woman at his apartment shortly before the shooting. His convictions and death sentence have been upheld through multiple state and federal appeals, but his execution has not been carried out amid ongoing litigation and the state's difficulties in obtaining viable execution drugs.

== Background ==
After attending high school, Floyd enlisted in the United States Marine Corps in 1994. He was honorably discharged in July 1998 with the rank of lance corporal due to heavy drinking and was told he was not welcome to re-enlist. Floyd later said that he joined the Marines with the sole and explicit purpose of killing people abroad.

Before the shooting that led to his conviction, he worked as a security guard and part-time as a bouncer at a bar. Days before the crime, he was fired from his security officer job and evicted from his apartment, moving back into a room at his parents' home.

== Sexual assault and shooting ==
Early on June 3, 1999, Floyd contacted an "outcall" escort agency and asked that a young woman be dispatched to his apartment. When a 20-year-old woman arrived at the apartment at around 3:30 a.m., Floyd immediately threatened her with a shotgun and forced her to engage in vaginal and anal intercourse, digital penetration, and fellatio. According to statements she later made to law enforcement and the court, Floyd told her during their encounter that she was going to help him fulfill a "sick fantasy" inside his head; he also showed her 19 bullets and told her that he was going to shoot the first 19 people he saw. He eventually told her she had 60 seconds to run before he would shoot her. She escaped. At around 5:00 a.m., Floyd took his shotgun and began walking to an Albertson's supermarket near his home.

At approximately 5:15 a.m., Floyd entered the supermarket and opened fire on random individuals in the store. Floyd first shot 40-year-old worker Thomas Darnell in the back, killing him. Immediately after, he shot and killed 41-year-old store manager Carlos Chuck Leos and 31-year-old worker Dennis Troy Sargent. Floyd then encountered 21-year-old worker Zachary T. Emenegger, who fled from Floyd when he saw the gunman pointing the shotgun in his direction. Emenegger tried to avoid Floyd's gunfire by ducking behind a produce table, but was shot in the shoulder, which resulted in punctures of both lungs. Floyd saw Emenegger move and shot him again. Emenegger played dead. Believing Emenegger was dead, Floyd whispered, "Yeah, you're dead", and continued searching the store. Eventually, Floyd found 60-year-old clerk Lucille Alice Tarantino in the rear of the store and fatally shot her in the head from point-blank range after she begged him not to kill her.

Thinking that Floyd had left, Emenegger attempted to get up and go for help but collapsed back onto the ground. As Floyd returned from the rear of the store and walked towards the entrance, he doubled back to ensure Emenegger was dead. After watching Emenegger for a moment, Floyd exited the store, where police officers were waiting outside. In total, Floyd was in the store for seven minutes.

== Arrest ==
Floyd exited the supermarket, only to encounter officers from the Las Vegas Metropolitan Police Department who had been called by an employee in an upper office. Without exchanging any gunfire, Floyd went back in the store for a few seconds and then came out again, pointing the shotgun at his own head. According to prosecutors, he also told police officers to shoot him. After an officer spoke with him for several minutes, Floyd put the gun down and was taken into custody.

When questioned by police, Floyd confessed to the killings and said he committed the murders because he had always wanted to know what it was like to kill someone, stating that "I've always just wanted to know, call me crazy, psychotic, whatever, I've just always wanted to know what it's like to shoot someone ... ever since I was a little kid, I've always, you know, ever since I saw my first, my first war movies, I've always just wanted to go to war and kill people".

== Trial ==
The trial was originally set to commence on March 6, 2000. In January 2000, police arrested the woman raped by Floyd, despite her being seven months pregnant, because she failed to stay in contact with the district attorney's office. She was released from jail after about a month. In February 2000, the judge postponed the trial to July due to unresolved legal issues.

The trial began on July 11, 2000. Jurors heard Floyd's confession to police and watched the surveillance-camera footage from the store. Floyd did not testify during the three-day trial; Emenegger testified against him. According to police testimony, Floyd had a blood alcohol concentration of approximately 0.14 percent around the time of the shootings while a test for controlled substances administered after his arrest was negative. On July 13, 2000, after deliberating for little more than two hours, the jury convicted Floyd of four counts of first degree murder with use of a deadly weapon, four counts of sexual assault with use of a deadly weapon, and single counts of burglary while in possession of a firearm, attempted murder with use of a deadly weapon, and first-degree kidnapping with use of a deadly weapon.

In the penalty phase of the trial, a psychologist called by the defense testified that Floyd "suffers from the mental disease of mixed personality disorder with borderline, paranoid, and depressive features" and confirmed a prior diagnosis of attention deficit hyperactivity disorder (ADHD). Another psychologist called by the State emphasized that Floyd knew what he was doing during the shootings and that he was not suffering from hallucinations or delusions on the day of the killings. A friend of Floyd testified that the two occasionally consumed methamphetamine together. In allocution, Floyd said that he was sorry for what he did, that "I can't take back what I did, but I would if I could" and that he would regret his actions for the rest of his life.

On July 21, 2000, after two days of deliberation, the jury recommended a sentence of death for each count of murder, finding that the aggravating circumstances outweighed any mitigating circumstances. On August 31, 2000, the judge followed the jury's recommendation; he also imposed the maximum prison terms for the other seven offenses, to be served consecutively, and ordered restitution totaling more than US$180,000.

== Appeals and postconviction proceedings ==
Floyd filed a direct appeal with the Nevada Supreme Court, alleging multiple violations of his constitutional rights and Nevada statutes by the district court. Among other things, Floyd challenged the State's use of psychological evidence garnered by a defense expert, and also claimed that his initial comments made to police after his arrest were admitted in violation of his Miranda rights. In March 2002, the Nevada Supreme Court affirmed his conviction and sentence. In 2003, the U.S. Supreme Court declined to hear an appeal.

In June 2003, Floyd filed a petition for a writ of habeas corpus in the state district court. Here, Floyd primarily advanced an ineffective assistance of counsel argument as to both his trial and his appellate counsel. In Floyd's view, trial counsel should have intervened when the prosecutor improperly introduced victim impact evidence at sentencing and made improper arguments at the penalty hearing, and appellate counsel should have raised multiple improper jury instructions on direct appeal. The petition was denied, and, in February 2006, the Nevada Supreme Court affirmed the denial.

In April 2006, Floyd filed a pro se federal habeas petition in the U.S. District Court for the District of Nevada, challenging his conviction and death sentence. (Under 28 U.S.C. § 2254, a person in state custody can challenge their conviction in federal court on the ground that their federal constitutional rights were violated.) In April 2007, the court stayed the federal proceedings pending exhaustion of certain claims in state court. In June 2007, Floyd therefore filed his second state habeas petition in state district court. In February 2008, the state district court held an evidentiary hearing on one narrow issue: whether post-conviction counsel in Floyd's prior state proceeding was ineffective in failing to pursue relief based on Floyd's alleged organic brain damage. In April 2009, the state district court denied relief, and in November 2010, the Nevada Supreme Court affirmed the lower court's ruling, dismissing Floyd's second petition as untimely and successive. Consequently, the U.S. District Court lifted its stay in March 2011. Shortly thereafter, Floyd filed a second amended federal habeas petition. In the petition, Floyd repeated many of the ineffective assistance of counsel claims he previously (and unsuccessfully) raised in the state court system, and alleged several instances of prosecutorial misconduct. The U.S. District Court issued its final order in December 2014: All of Floyd's claims were either dismissed or denied on the merits. However, the court allowed an appeal as to several issues. Floyd appealed. In October 2019, a three-judge panel of the United States Court of Appeals for the Ninth Circuit affirmed the district court's denial of Floyd's habeas petition. In July 2020, Floyd filed a petition for certiorari with the U.S. Supreme Court, challenging the Ninth Circuit's application of the Strickland standard. The petition was denied in November 2020.

== Execution-related proceedings ==
=== First execution warrant ===
In April 2021, the Clark County District Attorney began seeking an order of execution for Floyd on the grounds that Floyd had exhausted his legal remedies. A state court judge granted the order with the execution scheduled for the week of July 26, 2021, via lethal injection. However, a federal judge issued a preliminary injunction and stayed the execution to give Floyd more time to "adequately investigate and review [Nevada's] new execution protocol", which "would involve multiple variations of an untested sequence of drugs".

Floyd separately filed petitions with the Nevada Supreme Court, one alleging separation-of-powers violations by the district attorney's office, another challenging the authority and jurisdiction of the particular department of the state district court to issue an order of execution, and a third challenging the specific prison in which he was supposed to be executed. The court eventually dismissed all three petitions. Floyd also filed a complaint against the Nevada Department of Corrections (NDOC), in which he alleged that Nevada's statute providing that an execution must be effectuated by "injection of a lethal drug" unconstitutionally delegates lawmaking authority to the NDOC and its director, because the statute gives the director discretion to determine the process by which a lethal injection is administered. In January 2022, the district court dismissed Floyd's complaint; on appeal, the Nevada Supreme Court later affirmed. In addition, Floyd filed a third postconviction habeas petition in the district court. In March 2022, the petition was denied as procedurally barred; on appeal, the Nevada Supreme Court affirmed.

In February 2022, Clark County prosecutors acknowledged in court that they could not satisfy the legal requirements to obtain a new death warrant in time to carry out the execution before the state's supply of ketamine, one of the drugs used in lethal injections in Nevada, was due to expire on February 28. According to media reports at the time, it was uncertain whether and when the state would be able to obtain a new supply of ketamine.

=== Request for second execution warrant ===
In May 2026, the Clark County District Attorney's Office requested a new execution warrant for Floyd, proposing that the execution take place during the week of September 14, 2026. Some observers questioned the feasibility of this timeline as the NDOC acknowledged in a court filing that it was "not currently in possession of any unexpired medication for the drugs in the current execution protocol", adding that previously obtained drugs had expired and that the prison system would not use the expired medication.

On July 15, 2026, prosecutors announced that the parties would stipulate to stay the proceedings until the Nevada Supreme Court resolves two pending appeals by Floyd. In one of the cases, Floyd argues that it is unconstitutional for the Nevada Board of Pardons Commissioners to deny capital inmates access to clemency; in the other, he claims that Nevada's execution manual is an invalid regulation. The district court denied the relief sought by Floyd in both cases, and Floyd subsequently appealed. An assistant district attorney justified the decision to pause the execution warrant request for Floyd and another death row inmate, stating that "this will be one thing where we can have them finish this litigation and then really, we believe, there can't possibly be anything further that they could argue to delay this".

== See also ==
- List of homicides in Nevada
- List of death row inmates in the United States
