= Sonja McCaskie =

British alpine skier

Sonja McCaskie (19 February 1939 – 5 April 1963) was a British alpine skier who participated in the 1960 Winter Olympics. McCaskie lived in Reno, Nevada, United States, with her son and worked at a nearby ski resort as an instructor prior to her death in 1963.

== Murder ==
A neighbour who was babysitting initially called the police to check on McCaskie after she failed to pick up her son. Police found McCaskie strangled, raped, and dismembered in her 2640 Yori Avenue apartment on Friday 5 April 1963. She had been murdered by Thomas Lee Bean, an 18-year-old high school student who attended nearby Wooster High School. Bean was sentenced to death in the Nevada gas chamber for the murder, but was taken off death row in 1970. As of 2019, he was incarcerated in Northern Nevada Correctional Center and was the longest-serving inmate in the Nevada Department of Corrections. Bean died in prison on 17 March 2025.

The murder was sensationalised in the 8 September 1963, issue (25-31 August early sports edition) of the National Enquirer with the front page headline (and a grisly photo) as: "I CUT OUT HER HEART & STOMPED ON IT".

8 Sept. 1963 National Enquirer

== See also ==
- List of homicides in Nevada
