= Murder of Gwenn Story =

American ex-unidentified 1979 murder victim

Gwenn Story
- Undated high school photograph of Story
- Born: February 23, 1960
- Disappeared: Cincinnati, Ohio, US
- Status: Identified on December 19, 2023
- Died: August 14, 1979 (aged 19); Las Vegas, Nevada, U.S.
- Cause of death: Homicide by stabbing
- Resting place: Woodlawn Cemetery, Las Vegas, Clark County, Nevada, United States
- Other names: Jane Las Vegas Doe; Sahara Sue
- Known for: Formerly unidentified victim of homicide
- Height: 5 ft 6 in (1.68 m)

Gwenn Marie Story (February 23, 1960 – August 14, 1979) was a 19-year-old American woman who was murdered in Las Vegas, Nevada, on August 14, 1979. Her body remained unidentified for 44 years before being identified via DNA analysis and genetic genealogy in December 2023. Prior to her identification, Story was nicknamed "Sahara Sue" and "Jane Las Vegas Doe" because her body was found near the Sahara Hotel in Las Vegas, at the intersection of Sahara and Las Vegas Boulevard. Developments at one point indicated that she may have used the name "Shawna" or "Shauna" when she was alive, though this proved unfounded.

Story was also known by the fact that she was wearing a complete upper denture despite her young age.

== Discovery ==
Story's body was found lying face down in a parking lot on August 14, 1979. It was estimated that she had died three to four hours before being found. She had been stabbed several times in the abdomen.

It was reported that Story was seen with a white man before the discovery of her body.

== Description ==
Story was a white woman with brown eyes and wavy light brown hair. She was 5 feet 6 inches (1.68 m) tall and weighed 100-105 pounds (45–48 kg). Her age was estimated to be between 15 and 30. She had no teeth but wore at least one denture, as the maxillary piece was discovered in her mouth after the body was located. The mandibular piece was not recovered. The nails on her feet and hands had been manicured and painted with red polish.

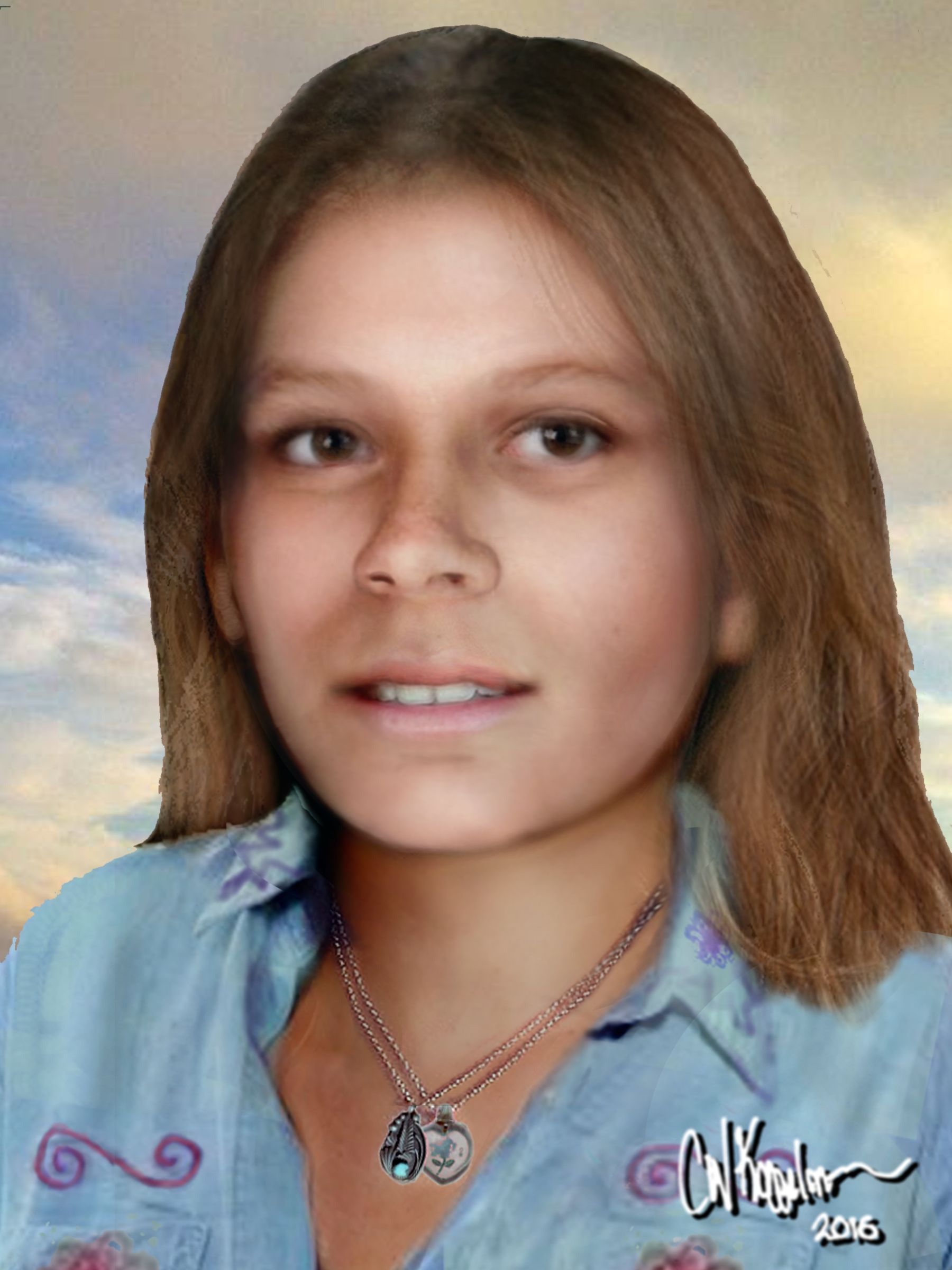
Reconstruction of Story by Carl Koppelman, illustrating the shirt and pendants that she wore

She was wearing a shirt and hip-hugger jeans. Her shirt was blue and made of linen, with a tie near the waist area and red embroidered designs and sequins. Her shoes were not found and it was evident that the killer had removed some of her clothing.

Reconstructions of Story's face by the National Center for Missing & Exploited Children

=== Jewelry ===
On her right hand, she had a ring made of white metal without any stone. She was wearing two pendant necklaces made of white metal. One pendant had a leaf design and a round turquoise stone. The other was made of plastic and was heart-shaped with a rose design. She was not wearing earrings, and her ears had not been pierced.

== Investigation ==
Fingerprints were taken from Story's body and entered into national databases, but no match was found. Her body was exhumed in 2003 to obtain DNA but no match was found. In 2011, her DNA was tested to see if she was a match to Deborah Rae Meyer, who had vanished in August 1974. They both had dentures and shared similarities, but DNA testing proved they were not the same person and Meyer remains missing. Through these forms of body identification, at least seven missing people were ruled out as possible identities for Story. Pictures of her face were released to public websites, and multiple reconstructions of her face also exist.

External images
- Second profile reconstruction
- Shirt
- Pendants

In 2016, investigation yielded several major developments in the victim's case. Forensic palynology on her clothing indicated she had spent time in Napa Valley or Central Valley of California sometime before her murder. Another potential lead suggested that Story may have had ties to a trailer park in the area. Further investigation indicated she might have used the name "Shawna" or "Shauna" and may have been employed at a Holiday Inn or another motel on Las Vegas Boulevard.

== Identification ==
In September 2022, the Las Vegas Metropolitan Police Department submitted forensic evidence to Othram Inc. Othram scientists successfully extracted DNA and then used Forensic-Grade Genome Sequencing to build a DNA profile for the woman. Othram's in-house forensic genetic genealogy team used the profile in a genetic genealogy search to develop investigative leads that were returned to investigators. Las Vegas police investigators continued their investigation using these leads.

On December 19, 2023, Sahara Sue was formally identified as Story. During the course of the investigation, investigators were told by Story's family that she left her hometown of Cincinnati, Ohio in the summer of 1979 with two male friends to locate her biological father in California. Story never made contact with her family again after this time period. Her two friends returned to Cincinnati in August 1979 and told Story's family that they left her in Las Vegas. Investigators are currently seeking more information on Story's two friends.

== See also ==
- Cold case
- List of homicides in Nevada
- Lists of solved missing person cases
- List of unsolved murders (1900–1979)
- The Doe Network
- Unidentified decedent
