= Murder of Alyssa Otremba =

2011 abduction, rape and murder of a teenage girl in Nevada

- Location: Las Vegas, Nevada, U.S.
- Date: September 2, 2011
- Attack type: Murder by stabbing and torture, kidnapping, rape
- Weapon: Knife
- Victims: Alyssa Otremba, 15
- Verdict: Guilty
- Convictions: First-degree murder
- Sentence: Death (May 9, 2017)
- Convicted: Javier Righetti

The murder of Alyssa Otremba (May 16, 1996 – September 2, 2011) occurred in Las Vegas, Nevada, on September 2, 2011, when 19-year-old Javier Righetti (born May 9, 1992) abducted the 15-year-old student while she was heading to a friend's house, before he raped and murdered Otremba, stabbing her more than 80 times and mutilating her body. Righetti was arrested and charged with multiple counts pertaining to Otremba's death, including kidnapping, rape and first-degree murder. Although Righetti pleaded guilty in 2016 to the murder, his guilty plea was eventually overturned by a judge, and Righetti was later found guilty of murdering Otremba in a jury trial, and sentenced to death in 2017.

== Murder ==
On September 2, 2011, in Las Vegas, Nevada, a 15-year-old teenage girl was attacked, raped and murdered by her assailant inside a tunnel.

Earlier that day, the victim, Alyssa Otremba, who was then a freshman of Arbor View High School, stayed home sick, and later on, Otremba decided to visit a friend to borrow a math book, so as to help catch up on her assignments and missed lessons. However, she never made it to the friend's house, because on the way there, Otremba encountered 19-year-old Javier Righetti inside a tunnel underneath a freeway, where she was attacked by Righetti. At the time of the attack, Righetti and Otremba did not know each other, but the former lived nearby the victim's house, and he was formerly a student of Arbor View in 2007, before he transferred to Centennial High School in 2008 as a junior student.

After attacking Otremba, Righetti forcibly took her handphone and forced the girl to undress. Afterwards, Righetti raped Otremba and performed oral sex on her, before he wielded a knife to stab her repeatedly in the face and torso. In total, Righetti had stabbed Otremba more than 80 times, and Otremba died as a result of the stabbing and mutilation. After murdering Otremba, Righetti also carved the initials "L.V." on into her body before burning it and abandoning it at a vacant lot located less than 100 yards from her family's home.

Meanwhile, Otremba's mother was alarmed by her disappearance, after her daughter last texted her, and by morning, Otremba did not return home. A group of her family members and friends, as well as several members of the Air Force (Otremba's father was also part of the Air Force), initiated a search for the missing girl, and eventually, a teenage couple found Otremba's body at the vacant lot. Given that the body was badly burned, Otremba was not identified until two days after the discovery of her body.

== Charges ==
On September 5, 2011, two days after the murder of Alyssa Otremba, Javier Righetti was arrested for the crime. Later, the police announced that Righetti had confessed to the rape and murder of Otremba while in custody. A candlelight vigil was held for the victim two days after the arrest of Righetti.

After his capture, Righetti was charged with kidnapping, raping and murdering Otremba. State prosecutor Christopher Lalli expressed that Righetti would potentially face the death penalty for the murder of Otremba, should the Clark County District Attorney's Office decide to pursue it during his upcoming murder trial.

On October 7, 2011, Righetti was formally indicted by a Clark County grand jury for the abduction, murder and rape of Otremba, and Clark County District Attorney David Roger confirmed six days later that he would seek the death penalty for Righetti. Two weeks after his indictment, on October 20, 2011, Righetti pleaded not guilty to raping and murdering Otremba. By March 2015, Righetti's trial was scheduled to tentatively take place in March 2016.

On February 17, 2016, before his trial could proceed, Righetti made the unusual decision to plead guilty to all ten criminal charges, including first-degree kidnapping and sexual assault with a child. His plea did not carry the condition of waiving the death penalty as an option for sentencing, and as a result of this plea, Righetti was set to be sentenced on a later date, and he potentially faced the death penalty.

After the guilty plea was submitted, the prosecution filed a motion to strike out Righetti's plea for the charge of murder, because Righetti did not specifically admit in his plea that the murder was committed in a willful, premeditated and deliberate manner, which were crucial in deciding whether to impose the death penalty for Righetti. On March 17, 2016, a state judge agreed to the prosecution's request to throw out the plea over the first-degree murder charge, and Righetti was therefore set to stand trial for first-degree murder on a date to be scheduled for the murder of Otremba.

== Trial ==
On February 17, 2017, the Nevada Supreme Court upheld the decision of the state judge to throw out Javier Righetti's plea of guilt, and ordered him to be put on trial for the charge of murder, and Righetti's murder trial was tentatively scheduled for the following month. The bereaved family of Alyssa Otremba were grateful that the trial was allowed to go ahead, and they continued to hope for justice to be served.

On February 22, 2017, District Judge Michelle Levitt found Righetti mentally competent to face the death penalty, after she found that he did not suffer from an intellectual disability based on her evaluation of the testimony from psychologists. Nevada law bars the prosecution from seeking the death penalty for suspects who were certified to be intellectually disabled.

On March 9, 2017, Javier Righetti officially stood trial for the murder of Otremba, and on that same day, Chief Deputy District Attorney Giancarlo Pesci made the opening statements on behalf of the prosecution.

On March 16, 2017, Righetti was found guilty of first-degree murder by the jury.

During the sentencing trial, Chief Deputy District Attorney Giancarlo Pesci sought the death penalty for Righetti, highlighting the aggravating factors of the case, and further revealed that Righetti had raped four more females, one of whom was his cousin. Righetti was in fact wanted by the Mexico authorities for charges of raping his cousin alongside a group of accomplices in the coastal town of Mazatlán. The defence, on the other hand, implored the jury to not vote for the death sentence, and his family were called to testify. They revealed that Righetti had a troubled childhood, and his father, who was known to be domineering and violent, raised him to believe that women should be submissive. When he gave his testimony in court, Righetti stated that he did not blame anyone but himself for what he had done.

On March 22, 2017, the jury unanimously voted to impose the death penalty for Righetti for the most serious charge of first-degree murder. At the time of sentencing, Righetti was the youngest person in Nevada's 170-year history to be sentenced to death.

Although capital punishment remains legal in Nevada, there was a tangible possibility that Righetti, who joined Nevada's death row as its 83rd inmate, may not be executed, given that the state rarely carries out executions, and only 12 prisoners were put to death in Nevada since the 1976 resumption of capital punishment in the United States. Since 2006, convicted murderer Daryl Mack remains the last person to be executed in Nevada. This possibility was also cemented by the recent bill proposed by lawmakers to repeal the death penalty at the time of Righetti's sentencing.

On May 9, 2017, Righetti was formally sentenced to death by Clark County District Court Judge Michelle Leavitt. Additionally, Judge Leavitt sentenced Righetti to 116 years to life for the other charges of rape and kidnapping.

== Death row and aftermath ==
2024 Mugshot of Javier Righetti

The same day he was sentenced to death, Javier Righetti filed an appeal to the Nevada Supreme Court against his death sentence and conviction. On April 19, 2019, two years after he was condemned to death row, the Nevada Supreme Court denied Righetti's appeal and upheld his death sentence.

In 2019, true crime documentary show True Conviction re-enacted the murder of Otrumba and an episode featuring the case, titled A Mother's Nightmare, was aired that same year.

In September 2020, Righetti allegedly stabbed another death row prisoner, Ammar Harris, while in prison. Harris was convicted of murdering three people in the 2013 Las Vegas Strip shooting and crash. Harris, who was in critical condition and was placed on life support, eventually recovered well enough to be able to speak by October 2020.

In April 2021, the Nevada State Assembly voted to pass a bill that could abolish the death penalty in Nevada and commute all the state's existing death sentences to life without parole, and the bill was pending before the Democratic-controlled Senate for further approval. In response to the state's proposal to outlaw capital punishment, Otremba's mother expressed her opposition to the possibility of barring the death penalty in the state, and stated her daughter's killer deserved to be justly punished with execution for his actions of taking her daughter's life without consideration for it. Ultimately, the bill was not put up for a vote in the Senate, and Governor Steve Sisolak also publicly opposed the move to abolish the death penalty, which ultimately stalled the efforts to end Nevada's use of capital punishment.

As of October 2021, Righetti was one of 64 prisoners on Nevada's death row. That same month, the Las Vegas Review-Journal reported on its recent interview with Otremba's mother, who expressed that she was resigned to the possibility that Righetti may not be executed for murdering her daughter, in part due to the state not carrying out executions since 2006, but she believed that the death penalty in general should be retained and opposed the possibility of abolishing it.

In December 2022, outgoing Governor Sisolak announced that he intended to exercise his prerogative to commute the death sentences of all 57 prisoners on Nevada's death row before the end of his term. In response, Otremba's mother filed a petition to oppose the governor's decision for a blanket pardon, seeking to uphold the death penalty for Righetti and argued that the victims' families deserved the right to "reasonable notice" when the condemned inmate's sentence would be reviewed for possible reduction. That same month, Carson City District Court Judge James Wilson Jr. ruled that Governor Sisolak's last-minute request cannot be put forward for review by the Nevada Board of Pardons, because the families of victims were not properly informed of the clemency proposal before it was announced, and therefore, the death sentences of Righetti and the remaining 56 death row prisoners were not commuted in the end.

As of 2026, Righetti remains incarcerated on death row at the High Desert State Prison.

== See also ==
- List of homicides in Nevada
- Capital punishment in Nevada
- List of death row inmates in the United States § Nevada
