= Murder of Tammy Terrell =

American ex-unidentified 1980 murder victim

Tammy Terrell
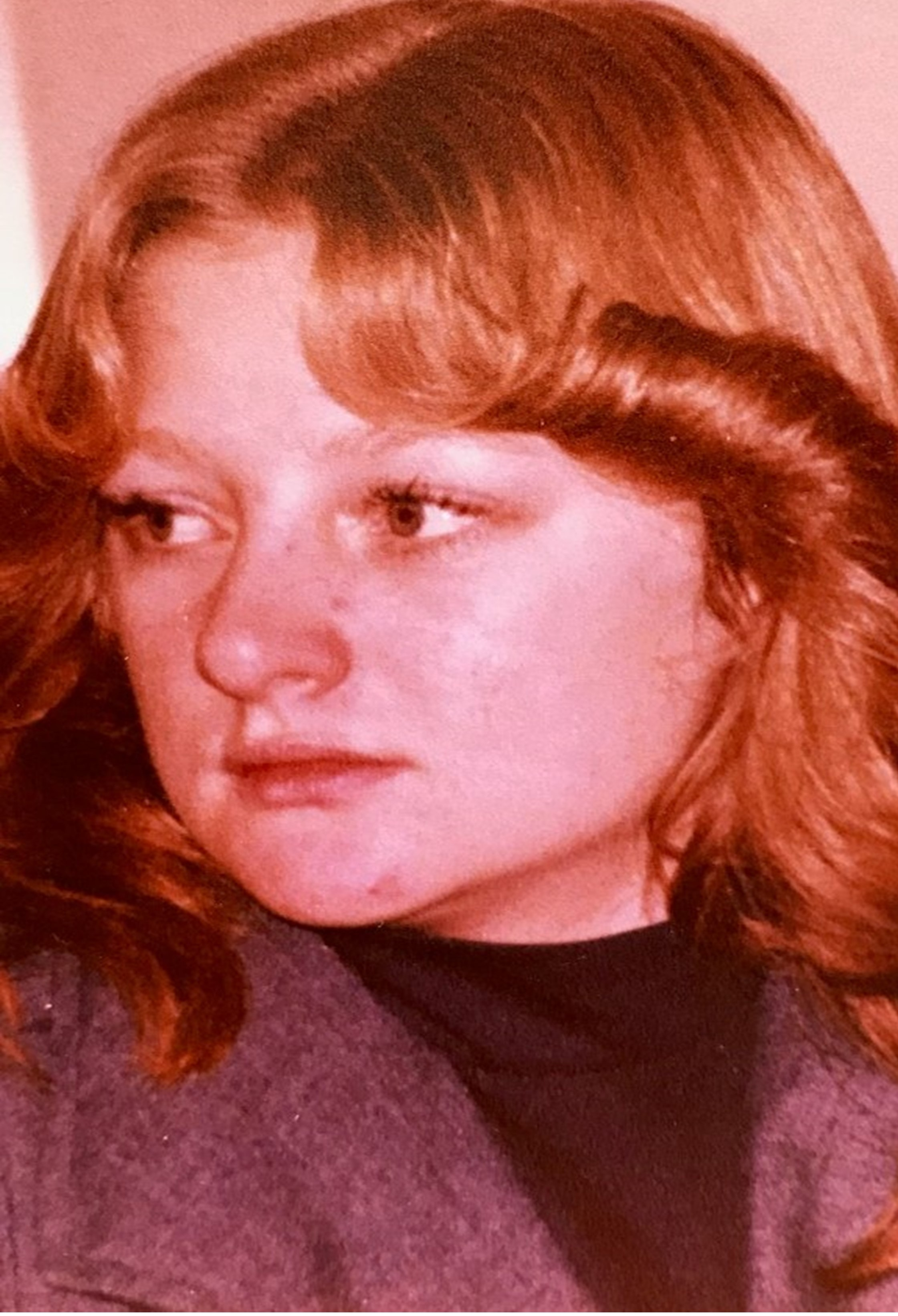
- Born: Tammy Corrine Terrell; July 4, 1963
- Disappeared: September 28, 1980; Roswell, New Mexico, U.S.
- Died: c. October 4, 1980 (aged 17); Henderson, Nevada, U.S.
- Cause of death: Homicide by stabbing and blunt force trauma
- Body discovered: October 5, 1980
- Resting place: Clark County, Nevada, United States
- Other name: Arroyo Grande Jane Doe
- Known for: Formerly unidentified victim of homicide
- Height: 5 ft 2 in (1.57 m)

Tammy Corrine Terrell (July 4, 1963 – c. October 4, 1980) was an American murder victim from Roswell, New Mexico. Her body was discovered on October 5, 1980, in Henderson, Nevada, and remained unidentified until December 2021. Her case has been the subject of extensive efforts by investigators and has been highlighted as inspiring other work to solve cold cases of unidentified murder victims.

Prior to her identification, she was known as "Arroyo Grande Jane Doe".

== Discovery ==
2015 reconstruction of the victim by the National Center for Missing & Exploited Children

At approximately 9:20 p.m. on October 5, 1980, the nude body of a white adolescent or young woman between 13 and 25 years old (most likely 17–18 years old) was found with blunt force trauma including multiple wounds to the back of the head (believed to be from a roofing hammer or framing hammer), signs of injury to the face, and seven puncture-type stab wounds on the upper left area of her back. One of her lower teeth had been knocked out in the attack. There was evidence of sexual assault.

Her body was found just south of State Route 146, near the Arroyo Grande wash, where the I-215 Beltway is currently. She had been placed in a position described as "posed, basically" and was face-down. The body was discovered by two brothers who were driving on a dirt road, one of whom was an off-duty police officer. The cause of death was identified as an unknown two-pronged instrument with prongs around 3 in (76 mm) long that was used to stab the victim. The body appeared to have been washed, and a piece of yellow or orange shower curtain was nearby.

Her hair was a natural brownish blond, red, or strawberry blond color at shoulder-length (about 11 in (280 mm) long). She was around 5 feet 2 inches (1.57 m) tall and weighed between 98–110 lb (44–50 kg). She still had her wisdom teeth (which were impacted) and had a visible gap between two of her upper-right teeth, possibly occurring postmortem. There is also the possibility she had fractured her jaw in the past. She had pierced ears and her nails were painted silver.

The victim had dental fillings in some of her teeth, showing that she had seen a dentist. Her eyes were a hazel or blue color (some sources say green) and she had a small (about 1/2″×1/4″), crude, apparently amateur tattoo of an "S" on the inside of her right forearm, made with blue ink. The tattoo appeared to have been "inked" not long before she died. She had a vaccination scar on her left biceps. It was determined that she had probably died the day before her body was discovered. The victim also had undergone an unusual "suture procedure" to straighten one of her teeth, which led investigators to believe she was not impoverished.

The police officer who discovered her body donated money for burial of the body, regularly visits the burial site with his wife, and leaves flowers in her memory.

== Investigation ==
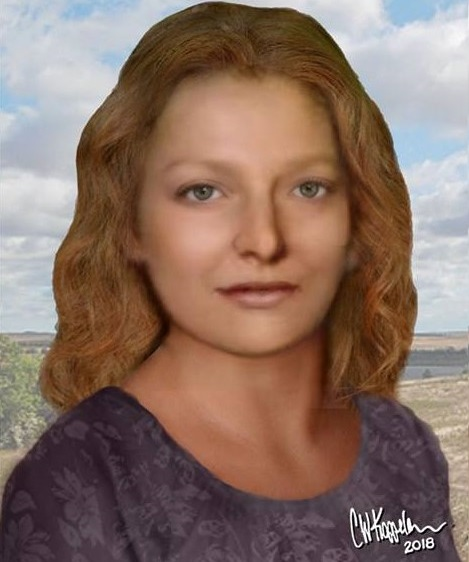
Additional rendering of the victim, this one by Carl Koppelman

Investigators made extensive efforts to try to identify the body of the young woman. The victim's fingerprints were taken and her dental characteristics were recorded, but could not be matched to anyone. Several television shows broadcast information about the case in the hope of generating leads, none of which led to her identification or the apprehension of her killer(s). Forensic facial reconstructions were created to provide a likeness of the Jane Doe, which were hoped to enable recognition by those that may have known her.

The body was exhumed at least four times for further investigations – in 2002, 2003, 2009, and 2016. In 2003, her body was exhumed after authorities followed clues to a missing girl from California, who was eventually ruled out by DNA analysis. Twenty missing people were excluded as potential identities for the victim.

The former coroner for Clark County when the victim's body was found has worked with the National Center for Missing & Exploited Children (NCMEC) to help with the case. In a video released in October 2015, he said "someone is missing their little girl – someone knows who she is – someone needs to come forward and help us", saying that he hoped the reconstructions created of the victim would trigger recognition. He said this victim's case was an impetus for the local department to develop a "cold case unit" for its unsolved cases. "She is the case that started it all for us", he said. The officer who found the body described similar feelings about the case.

In June 2015, the case was officially reopened by investigators. The new image replaced a version that the organization had created.

Hair samples collected at the time of her autopsy were sent to Astrea Forensics (Santa Cruz, California) in 2019. Using whole genome sequencing, they were able to create a genotype file that was uploaded to the ancestry site GedMatch, with the hopes that genealogists could find a relative in the database.

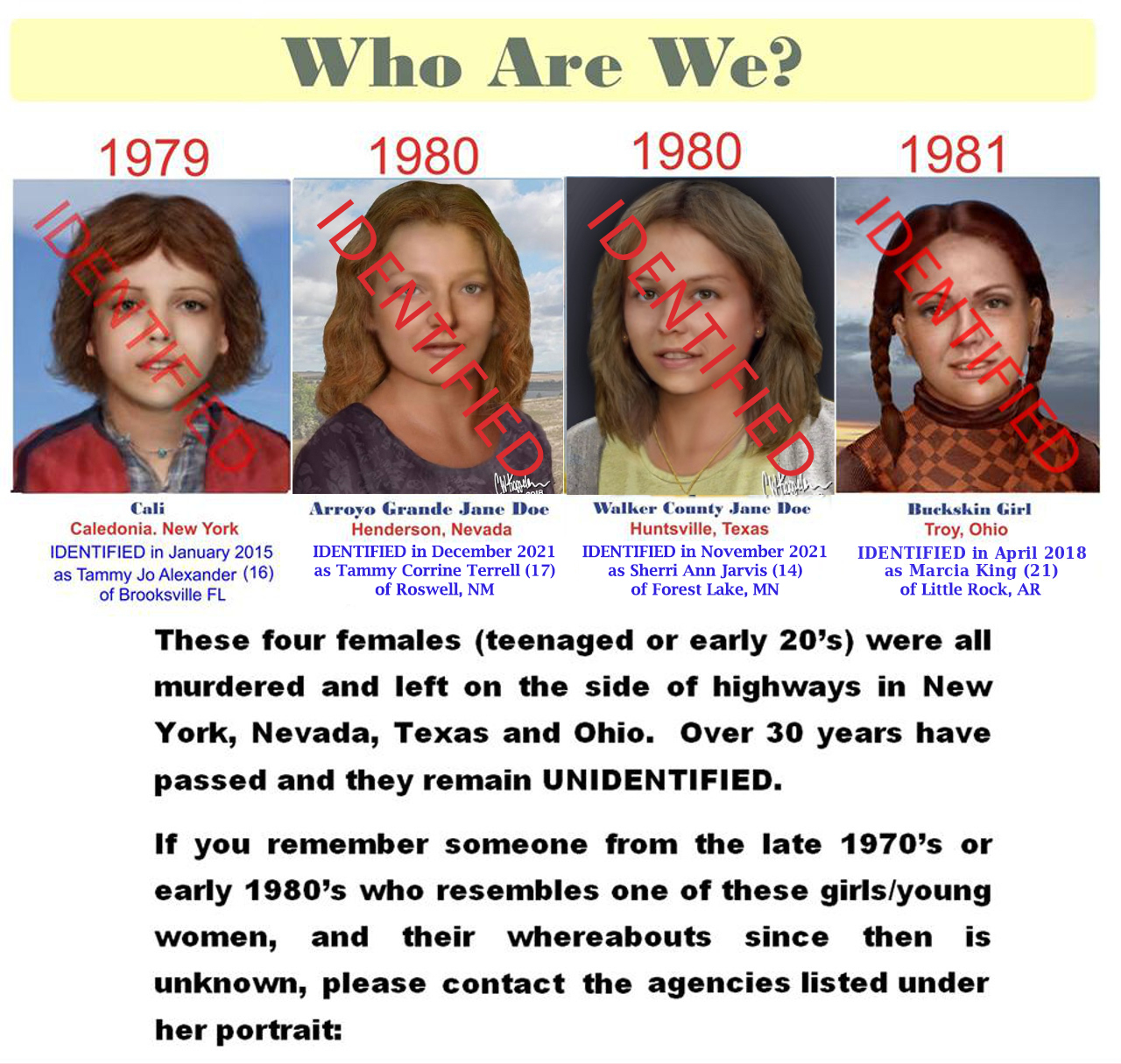
An array of four unidentified young females whose faces have been forensically reconstructed—all of whom have since been identified. Tammy Terrell is depicted second to the left

== Identification ==
On December 2, 2021, the Henderson Police Department announced that the Arroyo Grande Jane Doe had been identified as 17-year-old Tammy Corrine Terrell from Roswell, New Mexico. She was identified through forensic genealogy in an effort supervised by Barbara Rae-Venter, a genetic genealogist who also took part in the identification of the Golden State Killer in 2018. DNA samples from her two sisters were used to positively identify her.

Terrell was last seen on September 28, 1980, when she was dropped off at the Roswell State Fair. Later that night, she was seen at a restaurant in Roswell with a white man and a woman, possibly planning to head for California. The investigation into her murder is ongoing.

== See also ==
- List of homicides in Nevada
- Lists of solved missing person cases
- List of unsolved murders (1980–1999)
