= 2013 Las Vegas Strip shooting and crash =

2013 fatal shooting and crash in Las Vegas, Nevada

- Location: Las Vegas Strip, Nevada, United States
- Date: February 21, 2013
- Attack type: Shooting; Attempted murder Murder
- Weapon: Gun
- Deaths: Kenneth Cherry Jr., 27; Sandra Sutton-Wasmund, 48; Michael Boldon, 62
- Injuries: 6
- Verdict: Guilty
- Convictions: First-degree murder (x3); Attempted murder Felony discharge of firearms (x7)
- Sentence: Death (January 4, 2016)
- Convicted: Ammar Harris

The 2013 Las Vegas Strip shooting and crash occurred in the Las Vegas Strip of Nevada on February 21, 2013, when 29-year-old self-styled pimp Ammar Harris committed a drive-by shooting, killing Kenneth Cherry Jr. by aiming and shooting at Cherry's Maserati. Immediately after the shooting, Cherry's vehicle crashed into a taxi, further killing both the driver, Michael Boldon, and his passenger, Sandra Sutton-Wasmund. Harris was arrested a week later in Los Angeles, and was extradited back to Nevada, where he faced multiple felony counts, including three counts of first-degree murder. Harris was found guilty and sentenced to death in 2016, and is currently on death row awaiting execution.

== Murders ==
On February 21, 2013, a shooting broke out at the Las Vegas Strip in Nevada, leading to the deaths of three people and another six victims wounded.

On that day, an aspiring rapper named Kenneth Cherry Jr. was driving his Maserati on the road, with his companion Freddy Walters accompanying him in the car. While driving, Cherry's car was being stopped by another vehicle that pulled over and cut off Cherry's path. The driver of the other car, 29-year-old Ammar Asim Faruq Harris, reportedly a self-styled pimp, aimed a gun at the Maserati and fired multiple shots towards it. During the shooting, Cherry died immediately after being shot. Background information showed that Cherry, originally from Oakland, California, moved to Las Vegas to start his musical career, and he debuted under the stage name "Kenny Clutch".

Prior to the shooting, Harris, who was partying at a local nightclub with his girlfriend, reportedly got into an argument with a gun-wielding man while he returned there to retrieve his jacket after initially leaving the premises, and according to Harris's then girlfriend, she was handed a gun from Harris, who told her to keep it and get ready to use it if needed, and when Harris pulled over and stopped Cherry's car, the girlfriend, who by then realized Harris's intention, tried to dissuade him because Cherry was not the gun-wielding man he earlier quarreled with, but Harris still went ahead with shooting at the Maserati. Harris himself also had a long criminal record for multiple offences, including robbery, sexual assault and kidnapping.

After Cherry was killed, the car lost control as Cherry's foot pressed down on the pedal upon his death, and the Maserati sped forward at about 88 miles per hour, and simultaneously, Harris continued to drive and give chase, firing more shots at the Maserati, and Walters was wounded as a result. The Maserati collided with several vehicles while it sped forward, before it finally crashed into a taxi, which exploded and became engulfed in a fire, resulting in the deaths of the 62-year-old taxi driver Michael Boldon and his 48-year-old passenger Sandra Sutton-Wasmund. Another five people were also injured during the collision from the Maserati. At the time of their deaths, Boldon left behind four siblings and several children and grandchildren, while Sutton-Wasmund was a mother of three children and a businesswoman from the state of Washington.

The horrific nature of the shooting brought renewed attention to the 1996 murder of Tupac Shakur, a notable American rapper who was shot near the site of the shooting, and died six days later in a hospital 17 years back.

== Arrest and charges ==
Ammar Harris

After investigations identified Ammar Harris as the shooter, the police issued a warrant of arrest in his case. Additionally, a manhunt was conducted to locate Harris, and the state authorities of Nevada, Arizona, California and Utah started their search for the fugitive.

On February 28, 2013, a week after the murders, Harris was arrested at a friend's home in North Hollywood, Los Angeles. Clark County District Attorney Steve Wolfson, who conducted a press conference announcing the arrest of Harris, stated that his office would potentially filed capital murder charges against Harris, which carried the possibility of the death penalty.

Harris was scheduled to be extradited back to Nevada to face charges for the triple murder, but he filed a court motion to challenge the extradition order in March 2013. Ultimately, Harris was extradited back to Nevada on April 16, 2013, and he was taken into custody at the Clark County Jail in Las Vegas, where he was arrainged on charges of felony murder, attempted murder and felony discharge of firearms.

On April 26, 2013, a Clark County grand jury formally indicted Harris for three counts of first-degree murder, one count of attempted murder and seven counts of discharging a weapon in the shooting case, as well as one count of robbery and three counts of felony sexual assault in an unrelated 2010 case. The 2010 case was originally dismissed in 2012 given that the prosecution could not locate the victim in this case, coupled with the victim's refusal to testify. The robbery and sexual assault charges were revived after the victim re-appeared and testified to the grand jury about her ordeal.

On May 8, 2013, District Attorney Wolfson officially announced that his office would seek the death penalty for Harris. Pursuant to Nevada law, first-degree murder is punishable by death, life imprisonment without the possibility of parole, life imprisonment with parole eligibility after 20 years, or a fixed term of 50 years' imprisonment with eligibility for parole after serving 20 years.

On May 13, 2013, Harris, who originally stated he would admit to the offences, formally entered a plea of not guilty to all the criminal charges preferred against him.

In October 2013, Harris was allowed to change his attorneys to represent him in his upcoming murder trial.

== Trials of Ammar Harris ==
=== Rape trial ===
Before he stood trial for murder, Ammar Harris was first tried for the 2010 rape and robbery charges in September 2013. That same month, the jury found him guilty of one count of robbery and three counts of sexual assault. Harris faced a minimum sentence of ten years to life for rape, and two to 15 years for robbery.

On February 26, 2014, District Judge Kathleen Delaney sentenced Harris to 16 years to life in prison for rape.

=== Phone smuggling scheme and bribery trial ===
While he was awaiting trial for murder, in July 2014, Harris was found with a handphone in his prison cell at High Desert State Prison, where he was serving his life sentence for the 2010 sexual assault case. As a result of this discovery, Harris was transferred to the Ely State Prison, the state's maximum-security penitentiary. Investigations found that Harris and a fellow prisoner Derrick McKnight had bribed a corrections officer to smuggle phones and contraband during their incarceration. At that time, McKnight was serving life without parole for the 2006 murder of ex-basketball player Kenneth Hardwick, in which he acted as the getaway driver for his accomplice Timothy Burnside, who was sentenced to death as the shooter in that case.

In August 2014, Harris and six others, including McKnight and the bribed officer Derland Blake, was charged with bribery, illegal possession of phones by state inmates and other offences in connection to the phone and contraband smuggling scheme. Harris later agreed to plead guilty to the bribery charges after reaching a plea deal with the prosecution in October 2015.

On January 21, 2015, Harris was sentenced to an additional two to five years in prison for bribery, to be served consecutively to his life sentence. McKnight received the same two-to-five-year bribery sentence.

Among the other suspects, Re'Ann Atkinson (also known as Re'Ann Gadson) was sentenced to 18 months to four years for two counts of bribing a public officer. Blake pleaded guilty in September 2014 and was sentenced to five years of probation in January 2015. His probation was revoked in 2016 after he was charged with lewdness involving a minor, and he was later convicted in 2017 of attempted child abuse, neglect, or endangerment. In 2020, Blake was charged with six counts of sexual assault involving two boys. He later accepted a plea deal and, in 2025, was sentenced to probation and 728 days in jail for child abuse.

=== Murder trial ===
The murder trial of Ammar Harris was originally set for July 2015, before it was re-scheduled on October 12, 2015, and jury selection was set to begin that same date.

On October 15, 2015, a 12-member jury was assembled to hear the case, and opening statements were made on the same day. The jury was also presented with video footage of the shooting and crash, and Clark County prosecutor David Stanton described the triple deaths of Sutton-Wasmund, Boldon and Cherry as "premediated, intentional and deliberate" murders committed by Harris. Harris's ex-girlfriend, who was in the car at the time of the shooting, testified that she witnessed her former boyfriend shooting his gun, and admitted that she helped Harris to escape and go into hiding. She was charged for unrelated offences, which were reduced in exchange for her testimony against Harris.

During the defence phase of the trial, Harris did not testify or enter his defence, but his counsel argued that their client acted in self-defence and was not fully himself at the time of the crime, and additionally summoned both a casino valet employee and a psychiatrist to testify on their behalf. The valet employee stated that he witnessed Harris having a heated verbal exchange with someone before the shooting, while the psychiatrist, Dr. Norton Roitman, stated that it was possible for people under the influence of alcohol and ecstasy to experience distorted reactions to certain events.

On October 26, 2015, the jury found Harris guilty of all 11 felony counts: three counts of first-degree murder, one count of attempted murder and seven counts of discharge of a weapon.

The sentencing trial of Harris began on November 2, 2015. Harris waived his right to attend the first day of the trial, and during the hearing, two of his former girlfriends testified that Harris was violent and abusive towards them, and the prosecution, who were seeking the death penalty, further brought up his recent conviction for smuggling handphones and bribing a prison officer, and a detective from Nevada Department of Corrections also testified regarding the case.

On November 4, 2015, after two hours of deliberation, the jury unanimously recommended three death sentences for all three counts of first-degree murder. Harris's lawyers confirmed that they would appeal the death sentence.

On January 4, 2016, Harris was formally sentenced to death for the triple murder by District Court Judge Kathleen E. Delaney.

== Appeals and death row ==
On December 16, 2016, the Nevada Supreme Court accepted Ammar Harris's appeal against his rape and robbery convictions, and overturned both convictions and life sentence. A new trial was ordered for Harris on these rape and robbery charges, although a date was yet to be set to retry him for these cases.

In October 2018, Harris filed a direct appeal to the Nevada Supreme Court against his death sentence.

On December 27, 2018, Harris's appeal was denied by the Nevada Supreme Court, and his death sentences were thus upheld.

In August 2020, during his imprisonment, Harris was stabbed by another prisoner and he was taken to a hospital for treatment. He was reportedly in critical condition and therefore on life support. By October 2020, Harris had recovered well enough to be able to speak. The prisoner who stabbed Harris was identified as Javier Righetti, who was sentenced to death for the 2011 torture, rape and murder of 15-year-old Alyssa Otremba.

As of October 2021, Harris was one of 64 prisoners on Nevada's death row.

In December 2022, outgoing Nevada governor Steve Sisolak expressed that he would like to exercise his prerogative to clear the state's death row and commute the death sentences of all 57 condemned inmates to life without parole. This intention was first announced when outgoing Oregon governor Kate Brown issued a blanket clemency ruling and downgraded the sentences of all 17 people on Oregon's death row to life imprisonment. Nevada law allows the governor and state pardon board to grant clemency to death row inmates. However, Sisolak's proposal did not go through after Carson City District Court Judge James Wilson Jr. ruled that the families of victims were not properly informed of the clemency proposal before it was announced, and the death sentences of Harris and the remaining 56 death row prisoners were thus maintained.

As of 2026, Harris remains incarcerated on death row at the High Desert State Prison.

== See also ==
- List of homicides in Nevada
- Capital punishment in Nevada
- List of death row inmates in the United States § Nevada
- List of murdered hip-hop musicians
