= 2011 Carson City IHOP shooting =

Mass shooting in Nevada, U.S.

Carson City IHOP shooting
- Location: 39.1313°N 119.7695°W; Carson City, Nevada, U.S.
- Date: September 6, 2011; 8:57:15 – 8:58 a.m. (UTC-08)
- Attack type: Mass shooting, murder-suicide, mass murder
- Weapons: Norinco MAK-90 automatic rifle; Colt Agent
- Deaths: 5 (including the perpetrator)
- Injuries: 7
- Perpetrator: Eduardo Sencion
- Motive: Unknown

On September 6, 2011, a mass shooting occurred in an IHOP restaurant in Carson City, Nevada, United States. A gunman, identified as 32-year-old Eduardo Sencion, killed four people and wounded seven others before fatally shooting himself. Three of the deceased victims, as well as two of the injured victims, were members of the National Guard.

== Shooting ==
At 8:56 a.m., Sencion arrived at a local strip mall in a blue minivan that was registered in his brother's name. At 8:57:15 a.m., he got out of his minivan and fired a burst of 30 rounds into the air from his Norinco MAK-90 semi-automatic rifle that had its stock removed and was converted to fully-automatic, a felony under the 1934 National Firearms Act (NFA). Sencion reloaded the rifle. At 8:57:40 a.m., he walked inside the center's IHOP and made his way to the back where he started shooting. He first shot a 67-year-old woman to death and wounded her husband at a table. He then targeted a group of uniformed National Guardsmen, all of whom were eating at the same booth next to the table where the elderly couple were shot; five of them were shot, three of them fatally. He then turned towards a different row of booths and fired more shots, wounding two more people, including a man who had to have a leg amputated after the shooting.

Sencion then left the restaurant at 8:58:07 a.m.. He reloaded his rifle and moved towards the parking lot. At 8:58:18 a.m., he ran up to a woman on her motorcycle and shot her head at point blank, wounding her. Her life was saved because she was wearing a motorcycle helmet which got shot, while her head underneath was only grazed. At 8:58:26 a.m., Sencion began shooting into three nearby businesses and at his own minivan, injuring no one. During the massacre, Ralph Swagler, who owned a neighboring restaurant, grabbed his own gun with the intention of shooting Sencion, but was unable to due to the rapid gunfire. Sencion stopped shooting at 8:58:37 a.m., and walked towards his minivan while ejecting the magazine from his rifle. It is assumed Sencion took out a Colt Agent revolver from his minivan and shot himself in the head between 8:58:40 - 8:58:45 a.m.. Police arrived at 9:06 a.m.. Police would later find a Romarm/CUGIR GP WASR-10 rifle and a Glock 26 Gen3 semi-automatic pistol in his van outside the restaurant. Due to the severity of the massacre and fears that it would become more widespread, Nevada officials declared a lock-down on the state capitol and Supreme Court buildings for around 40 minutes, while extra security was set up at state and military buildings in northern Nevada.

== Victims ==
A total of four people, excluding the gunman, were killed in the shooting. They were identified as:

- Florence Louise Donovan-Gunderson, 67
- Nevada National Guard Lieutenant Colonel Heath A. Kelly, 35
- Nevada National Guard Sgt 1st Class Miranda S. McElhiney, 31
- Nevada National Guard Master Sergeant Christian D. Riege, 38

Florence Donovan-Gunderson, Nevada National Guard Major Heath Kelly, and Nevada National Guard Sgt 1st Class Christian Riege were all declared dead at the scene, while Nevada National Guard Sgt 1st Class Miranda McElhiney later died at a local hospital. About three hours after the massacre, Sencion died from a self-inflicted gunshot wound.

Seven other people survived the shooting with injuries, all of them caused by gunshot wounds. Four were taken to the Renown Regional Medical Center in Reno, three by helicopter, while the remaining three went to another hospital in Carson City to undergo surgery. Four were in critical condition, while the remaining three suffered minor wounds. Two of the surviving victims were members of the National Guard.

== Perpetrator ==
Eduardo Sencion (also known as Eduardo Perez-Gonzalez; July 22, 1979 – September 6, 2011) was born in Mexico and had a valid U.S. passport. He had no previous criminal history and worked at his family's business located in South Lake Tahoe. Diagnosed with paranoid schizophrenia when he was eighteen years old, he had no traces of antipsychotic drugs in his body on the day of the massacre, according to toxicology reports. In January 2009, he filed for bankruptcy, listing more than $42,000 in outstanding debts for a car, several credit cards, and medical expenses. His motive for the attack is unknown by law-enforcement officials, though there was no indication that it was a terrorist attack, and that he had no known connection to the military, nor motivation for shooting the National Guardsmen.

== Reaction ==
After the massacre, Nevada Senator Harry Reid issued a statement, saying, "I'm deeply saddened by this senseless act and extend my sympathies to those afflicted this morning. I applaud the first responders for their professionalism, and my thoughts are with the victims and their families during this difficult time." Nevada U.S. Representative Joe Heck and Nevada State Senator Ben Kieckhefer also expressed their condolences on Twitter. Nevada Governor Brian Sandoval said in a written statement, "The [Carson City] mayor and I ... want to assure all Nevadans and especially residents of Carson City that everything is being done to ensure the public's safety." Sandoval also ordered flags flown at half-staff until Friday at dusk in honor of the slain National Guardsmen. Two of the guardsmen were posthumously promoted in memory of their service: Master Sergeant Christian Riege and Lieutenant Colonel Heath Kelly.

== See also ==
- List of homicides in Nevada
- List of rampage killers in the United States
