= Las Vegas courthouse shooting =

Shooting in Nevada, US

Coordinates: 36.165°N 115.143°W

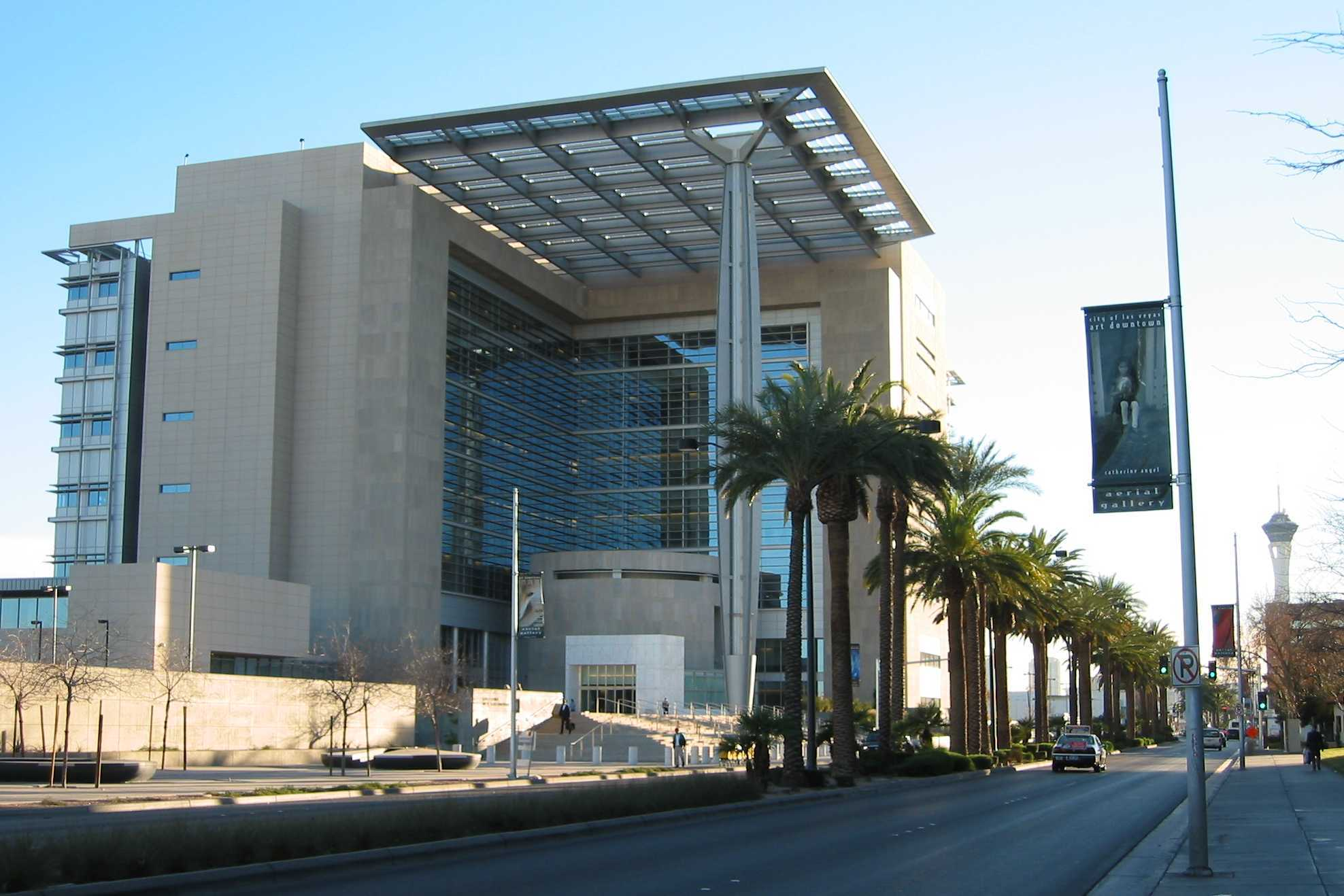
- The Las Vegas courthouse building where the shooting occurred.
- Location: Las Vegas, Nevada, US
- Date: January 4, 2010 c. 8:00 a.m.
- Weapon: Mossberg 500 12 gauge shotgun
- Deaths: 2 (Stanley W. Cooper and the perpetrator)
- Injuries: 1 (Richard Gardner)
- Perpetrator: Johnny Lee Wicks
- Motive: Rage over Social Security benefits cuts

The Las Vegas courthouse shooting was an attack on January 4, 2010, in which a gunman opened fire in the lobby of the Lloyd D. George Federal District Courthouse in Las Vegas, Nevada, United States. Two people were killed in the attack, including the gunman, who was identified by authorities as Johnny Lee Wicks, a 66-year-old man disgruntled over cuts to his Social Security benefits. Stanley W. Cooper, a 72-year-old court security officer, was also killed after a shotgun blast struck him in the chest. A 48-year-old deputy U.S. Marshal named Richard "Joe" Gardner was shot in the upper arm, chest, and head, with a total of eight pieces of buckshot entering his body, and hospitalized at the University Medical Center, but survived.

== Shooting ==
Around 8 a.m., the gunman pulled a Mossberg 500 shotgun from underneath his black coat and started firing indiscriminately from outside the security areas where visitors pass through metal detectors and x-ray machines. Seven federal marshals returned fire and chased the shooter from the courthouse. As he fled, Wicks was shot in the head and died on the sidewalk in front of the Fifth Street School, a historic school that had been converted into an office building. Witnesses said about 20 shots were fired over several minutes. Authorities said Wicks was the only gunman involved in the shooting.

Wicks had filed a complaint against the Social Security Administration in 2008 regarding a reduction to his benefit. After Wicks relocated from California to a Las Vegas retirement home, his Social Security benefit was reduced by $317. Social Security Administration attorneys claimed the payments were reduced because, as a Nevada resident, Wicks was no longer entitled to a (state-funded) supplement he received while living in California. However, in his complaint, Wicks claimed the reduction was because he was an African American, although he cited no evidence to support the claim. Wicks wrote, "It's all about race. I am not a fool." Wicks failed to follow the Social Security system's appeals process, and a judge threw out the case in September 2009.

The nine-floor courthouse hosted offices for US Senators Harry Reid and John Ensign. Neither senator received any credible threats before the shooting. Shortly after the shooting, a man named Nicholas Gramenos recorded a video from few blocks away during the shooting. The clip was posted on the video-sharing site YouTube under his username, "NickyFlips". Several gunshots can be heard in the video, but the shooting itself was not visible. Hours after the shooting, some local television stations falsely reported multiple gunmen were still at large, leading to the evacuations of several commercial areas surrounding the courthouse. Several media outlets reported conflicting, erroneous information in the hours immediately following the shooting. The Associated Press first reported at least two federal marshals were shot, and the Las Vegas Sun reported "two or three federal marshals" were wounded. The Las Vegas Review-Journal initially reported two FBI agents were shot.

== Aftermath and impact ==
In the immediate aftermath, the Christian Science Monitor opined that this "shooting highlights rising threats ... to federal judges and prosecutors...."

The United States House of Representatives honored "the heroic actions" of the officers who responded to the shooting incident, naming specifically Officer Cooper and Deputy Marshall Gardner, in H.Res. 1242, sponsored by Congressman Hank Johnson. The UGSOA (United Government Security Officers Association) International Union honors Officer Cooper on their in memoriam web page of "Fallen Officers".

According to the Center for American Progress, this shooting was the primary incident in a series of shootings in Nevada from 2010 to 2013 that highlighted the need for "universal background checks". On the other hand, during training of county sheriffs in Texas, the incident was noted as a clear example where "entryway screening work[ed]"; but the Texas Association of Counties also noted that further "outcome measures" are needed to protect the nation's courts.

Over three years after the incident, United States Senate Majority Leader Harry Reid invoked the memory of the shooting in support of gun control.

Cooper's family was denied $300,000 in death benefits because although he was a deputized member of the US Marshals Service, he was working for the federal government at the courthouse through a private contractor and according to the Department of Justice, was ineligible to receive the benefits.

== See also ==
- List of homicides in Nevada
- 2019 Dallas courthouse shooting, a similar attack which targeted a courthouse
