= High Desert State Prison (Nevada) =

State prison in Clark County, Nevada, US

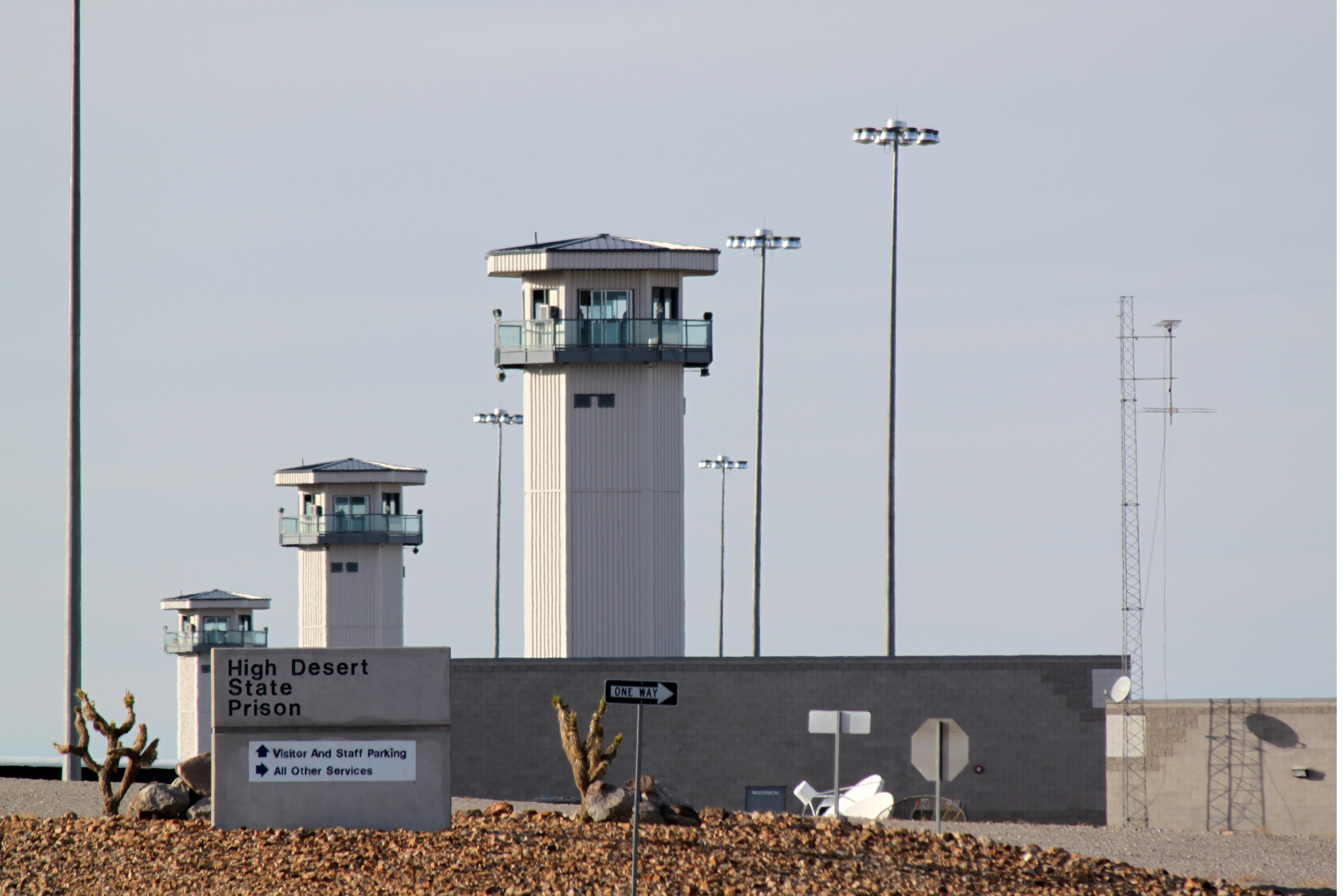
- Interactive map of High Desert State Prison
- Location: Clark County, Nevada; 36.5125°N 115.5822°W
- Status: Operational
- Security class: Medium-Maximum (Death Row)
- Capacity: 4,176
- Population: (%)
- Opened: 1 September 2000
- Managed by: Nevada Department of Corrections
- Warden: Jeremy Bean

High Desert State Prison is a maximum security state prison in unincorporated Clark County, Nevada, near Indian Springs, northwest of Las Vegas. It is the largest institution of the Nevada Department of Corrections and the newest, having opened on September 1, 2000. Since September 2024, the men's death row is located here. It has a capacity of 4,176.

== Facilities ==
The 1,576,000 ft^{2} (146,400 m^{2}) complex lies approximately 25 miles (40 km) northwest of Las Vegas along highway 95. It was designed to be the most secure prison within the Nevada Department of Corrections system. High Desert State Prison contains 12 housing units designed to house 336 inmates each. Each of units 1–8 are separated into four sections called "pods". Each pair of pods shares a common control center and staff office. Each pair also shares a sally port and an activity room.

There is a 26,000 sq ft (2,400 m^{2}) infirmary at the institution.

All of the facility is located at a 160-acre (65 ha) site which is kept secure by a lethal electrified fence and seven towers housing armed officers, as well as a roving perimeter patrol officer.

Construction was completed in 2009 added 1,344 beds to the original 2,671, for a total capacity of 4,176.

The Tonopah Conservation Camp is associated with the prison. The Clark County School District provides the education program on site using 8 classrooms and 2 libraries.

== History ==
The institution opened on September 1, 2000 and became the reception unit for southern Nevada. This facility was designed to be the first of several prisons to be built at this location. The facility presented many design challenges, such as electrical backup and water supply, and there have been difficulties in staff retention due to the remote location. The closest populated area to the prison is Indian Springs, 8 miles (13 km) north of the prison. To date, there have been two expansions. The first expansion, completed in 2004, added a 60,000 ft^{2} (5,600 m^{2}) prison industries building and a gymnasium. The second expansion added four more housing units. High Desert is one of the largest prisons in the United States, and is a medium security facility. High Desert is structurally the most secure prison in the Nevada Department of Corrections. In September 2024, Nevada's male death row inmates were transferred to High Desert State Prison from Ely State Prison. As a result High Desert prison became a maximum security facility while Ely's security level was reduced to medium.

== Notable inmates ==
Inmate Name	Register Number	Status	Details
Chester Stiles	1036868	Serving 21 life sentences.	Convicted child sexual abuser who recorded himself committing rape with a toddler, as well as molesting a 6-year-old.
Jason Griffith	1125188	Serving 10 years to life.	Convicted of murdering his girlfriend Debbie Flores Narvaez.

- O. J. Simpson, former Buffalo Bills running back, was briefly held at High Desert State Prison following his conviction in December 2008. He was then transferred to the Lovelock Correctional Center in Pershing County before being released in 2017.
- Musician Ronnie Radke was incarcerated in High Desert State Prison from August 2008 to December 2010 on possession of a dangerous weapon and probation violation charges.
- Chaz Higgs, a former nurse who was convicted of murder in the death of his wife, Nevada State Controller Kathy Augustine, is serving a 20-year to life sentence at High Desert State Prison.
- MMA fighter War Machine is incarcerated here. He was sentenced to 36 years to life for severely beating his ex-girlfriend, Christy Mack.
- Thomas Randolph, a Las Vegas murderer, the subject of a 2021 NBC three-part Dateline documentary, "The Widower", by producer Dan Slepian. Randolph was found guilty in 2017 by a jury, of the 2008 first-degree murders of his 6th wife and his handyman. Randolph's crimes, the murder investigations, and his murder trial, were documented as part of a 13-year investigation by NBC. He received two death sentences in 2017. Those two death sentences were overturned on appeal in December 2020. No new trial date for Randolph has been set as of February 2021.
- The 13th Duke of Manchester, who was sentenced to five years imprisonment for burglary in 2017.
- Erich Nowsch, convicted of the high-profile 2015 murder of Tammy Meyers in Las Vegas, which was the subject of multiple episodes of ABC’s show 20/20, is currently serving a life sentence in the prison.
- Henry Ruggs III, former Las Vegas Raiders wide receiver. Convicted of DUI resulting in death for the November 2, 2021 vehicular accident that killed a 23 year old woman and her dog. He is currently serving a sentence of between 3 and 10 years.
- Scott Thorson, who had sued Liberace for palimony, convicted of credit card fraud.
- Duane "Keffe D" Davis, who was criminally charged in September 2023 with having a role in the murder of Tupac Shakur and was previously still incarcerated at the Clark County Detention Center by September 2025, is currently serving a separate 16-40 month prison sentence at High Desert State Prison for a jailhouse fight conviction he received in September 2025.

=== Death row ===
- Ammar Harris, convicted of the 2013 Las Vegas Strip shooting and crash, which killed rapper Kenneth Cherry and both taxi driver Michael Boldon and passenger Sandra Sutton-Wasmund
- David Stephen Middleton, former police officer and convicted serial killer
- Zane Floyd, convicted mass shooter who killed four people and wounded a fifth victim in a 1999 Las Vegas supermarket shooting
- James Biela, who was found guilty of the 2008 murder of Brianna Denison
- Javier Righetti, who was found guilty of the 2011 murder of Alyssa Otremba
