= Northern Nevada Correctional Center =

Prison complex in Nevada, United States

Northern Nevada Correctional Center (NNCC), Stewart Conservation Camp (SCC), and Saddle Horse and Burro Training Program
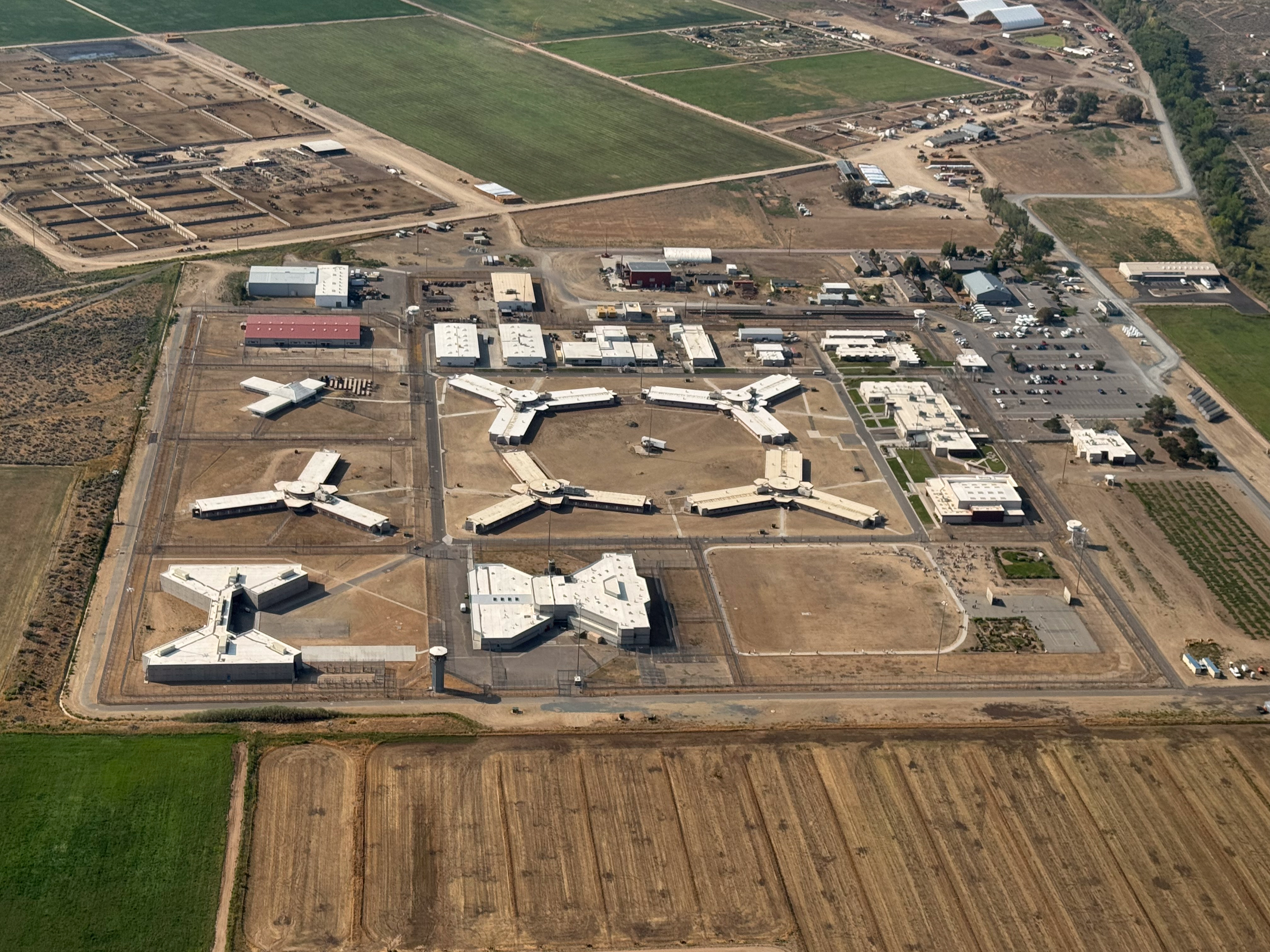
- Aerial photo of the prison complex
- Interactive map of Northern Nevada Correctional Center (NNCC), Stewart Conservation Camp (SCC), and Saddle Horse and Burro Training Program
- Location: 1721 Snyder Avenue Carson City, Nevada 89702; 39°06′31.32″N 119°44′39.48″W
- Status: Operational
- Security class: Medium (NNCC); Minimum (SCC)
- Capacity: 1,619 (NNCC); 240 (SCC)
- Population: 1,444 male inmates (NNCC); 9 female inmates (NNCC); 328 male inmates (SCC) (September 1, 2010)
- Opened: 1964 (NNCC); 1978 (SCC)
- Managed by: Nevada Department of Corrections
- Warden: John Henley

Northern Nevada Correctional Center (NNCC), Stewart Conservation Camp (SCC), and the Saddle Horse and Burro Training Program are part of a prison complex located in Carson City. The correctional center was established in 1964 and is managed by the Nevada Department of Corrections. The medium security center housed 1,444 male and 9 female inmates as of September 2010. It is designed with a capacity for 1,619 inmates and employs a staff of 373 as of 2008.

The adjacent Stewart Conservation Camp was opened in 1978 and is designed for 240 minimum security inmates who support the Nevada Division of Forestry with wildfire suppression and conservation efforts. The camp housed 328 male inmates and was budgeted for a total capacity of 350 as of September 2010.

The facility is also the site of the adjoining Saddle Horse and Burro Training Program. The program is a cooperative partnership between the Bureau of Land Management and the Nevada Department of Corrections-Silver State Industries. The NNCC is not only a holding facility with a capacity of up to 2,000 animals but it also has a training program which utilizes inmates to train wild horses to make available to the public for adoption. Typically three public adoption events are held each year. The program was featured in the 2019 drama film The Mustang.

== History ==
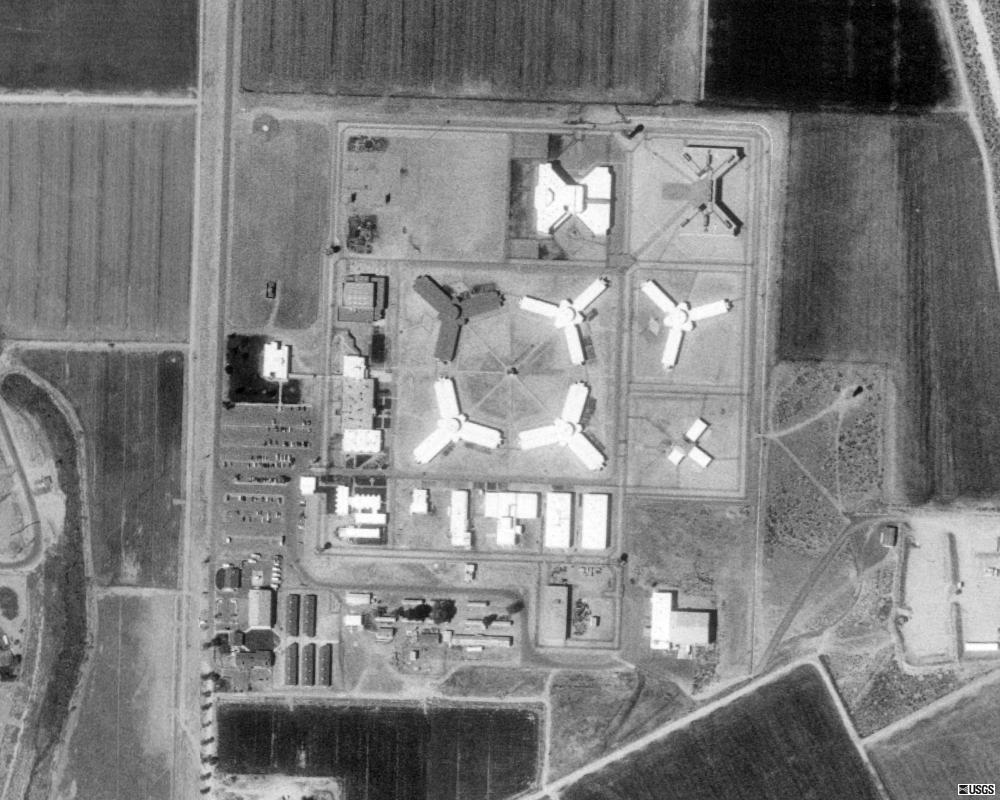
1999 aerial photo of the prison complex

Nevada State Prison (NSP), also in Carson City, which was the only state penitentiary for many decades, underwent expansion in the early 1960s. The result was a second facility in Carson City that would become known as Northern Nevada Correctional Center (NNCC). The correctional center was opened in 1964 with three housing units. An interesting fact is that the Correctional Center was to operate as a treatment center rather than a traditional lockdown facility. Staff members did not wear uniforms, instead wearing casual attire the staff interacted closely with inmates. Inmates addressed staff by their first names. This was an experiment in corrections that had never been done in Nevada. In contrast to Nevada's only other prison, Nevada State Prison, NNCC was created to treat the inmates' underlying problems that lead to incarceration. Emphasis was placed on drug and alcohol treatment, education and restoring family ties. This was evident by the lounge style visiting room and dedicated education building, both are still in use today. By 2008, seven additional units were constructed.

=== Media coverage ===
On January 7, 1982, singer Sammy Davis Jr. and comedian Tom Dreesen performed at the gymnasium of the correctional center for the inmates. Harrah's Reno provided an orchestra to support the event.

In May 1984, the Nevada State Press Association honored inmate Gerald Crane as the local best newspaper columnist for his work in the Nevada Appeal. Crane had been writing his "Being There" column while incarcerated at the correctional center for bank robbery and kidnapping; he was unable to attend the award ceremony.

=== Incidents ===
In 1987 The National Guard was called to NNCC to racially integrate the facility. The troops were positioned throughout the prison yard, atop of the housing units, and beside the traditional staff as inmates were given their new bed assignments. To date each dorm held 12 inmates that belonged to the same ethnic group. Due to recent court decisions then Department of Prisons was forced to integrate at least one inmate belonging to another ethnic group into each dorm. It was believed that the inmates would not accept these changes. Rumors were rampant of widespread riots and violence against both staff and those being integrated. The outcome was much less sensational. One inmate barked at a guard dog and was transferred to the maximum security prison for the infraction of creating a disturbance.

In October 1989, 48-year-old Kenneth James Meller took Dr. Karen Gedney hostage in the prison infirmary. Officers used a flashbang grenade to stun Meller and storm the room after negotiation efforts did not succeed. Meller was shot to death by the officers and Gedney was rescued. Though it was reported at the time that Gedney was unharmed, she has stated that she was raped by Meller during the ordeal.

In 2004, a prison guard was prosecuted for impregnating a female inmate. The American Civil Liberties Union protested the decision to also prosecute the inmate.

In August 2005, a dental technician and another corrections employee were fired after they were determined by officials to be involved in the escape of inmate Jody Thompson.

== Facilities ==
Silver State Industries operates the prison manufacturing program at Northern Nevada Correctional Center. Services include metal, paint, wood and upholstery shops. Vocational programs include auto mechanics, computers, and dry cleaning. Educational services are provided by the Carson City School District and Western Nevada Community College.

The Regional Medical Facility for the Nevada Department of Corrections is located at the site.

Following the closure of Nevada State Prison Northern Nevada Correctional Center is the current location where Nevada's license plates are made.

=== Energy usage ===
In 2007, a $7.7 million biomass fuel plant was constructed at the correctional center to utilize renewable energy. However, the power plant was closed in September 2010 after it was found to be adding to the facility's energy costs. According to Jeff Mohlenkamp, deputy director of support services for the Nevada Department of Corrections: "This was a project that was well intentioned, but not well implemented."

== Notable inmates ==
Inmate Name	Register Number	Status	Details
Thomas Lee Bean	8630	Life imprisonment. Bean died in prison March 17, 2025. At the time he was the longest-serving inmate in the state.	First degree murder
Darrell Edwards Brooks Jr.	1004366	Released in September 2008 after serving 18 months of a 12-36 month sentence	Statutory sexual seduction
Phillip C. Garrido	12954	Transferred on August 26, 1988	Sexual assault
John "Jack" Sidote	13157	Released on July 11, 1985	Murder
Clarence "C.J." Stewart	1028070	Released December 2010 on a plea deal after serving 27 months of a 7.5 year sentence	Assault, burglary, conspiracy, kidnapping
Henry Ruggs III	1273265	Serving sentence for 2021 DUI at Stewart Conservation Camp. Earliest possible date of release August 5, 2026.	DUI

== See also ==
- List of Nevada state prisons
- Nevada State Prison
