= University Medical Center of Southern Nevada =

- Clark County Commission
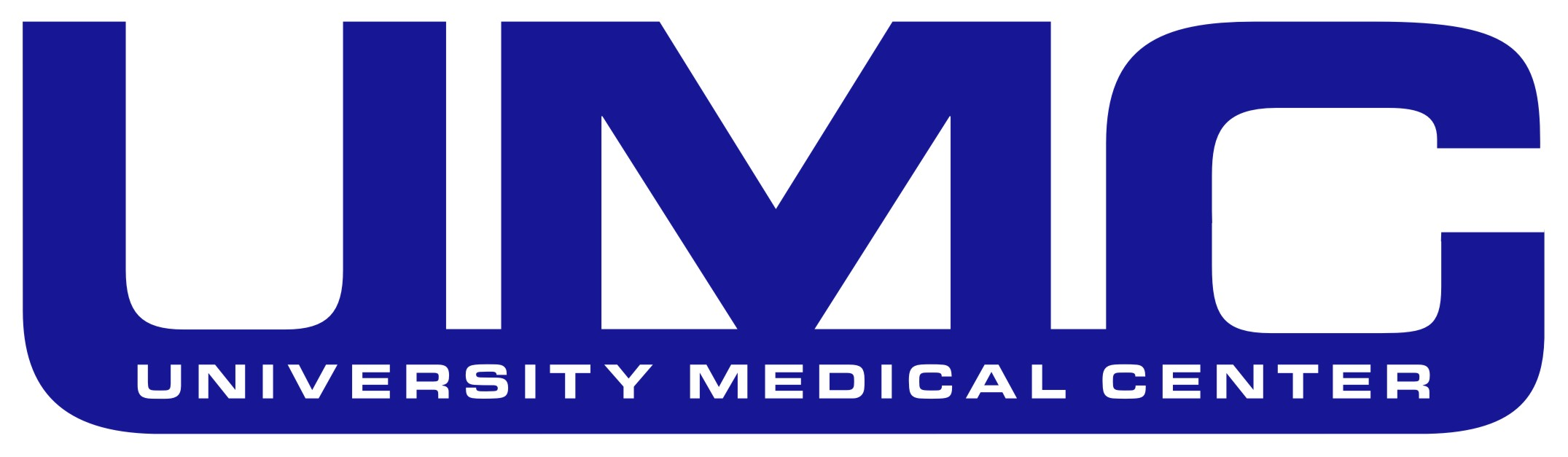

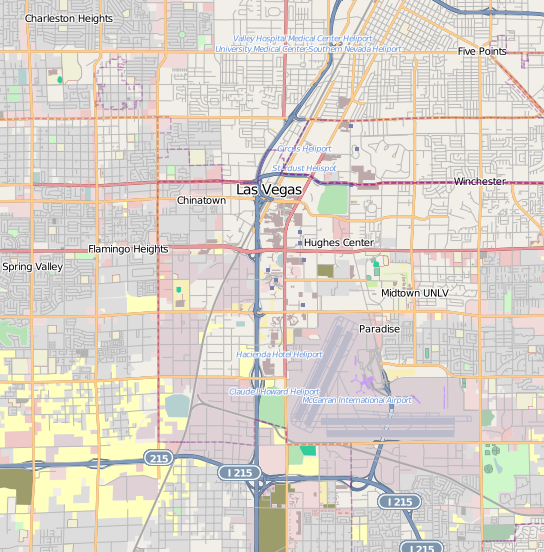
- Location in Las Vegas University Medical Center of Southern Nevada (Las Vegas Boulevard) University Medical Center of Southern Nevada (Nevada)

Geography
- Location: 1800 West Charleston Boulevard; Las Vegas, Clark County, Nevada, U.S.
- Coordinates: 36.1596°N 115.1674°W

Organisation
- Care system: Governmental
- Type: General and Teaching
- Affiliated university: University of Nevada, Reno School of Medicine (1969–2017); UNLV School of Medicine (2017–present)
- Network: Clark County Commission

Services
- Standards: Joint Commission
- Emergency department: Level I Adult Trauma Center / Level II Pediatric Trauma Center
- Beds: 564 (2010)

Helipads
- Helipad: FAA LID: NV34

History
- Founded: 1931; 95 years ago

Links
- Website: umcsn.com
- Lists: Hospitals in U.S.

University Medical Center of Southern Nevada (UMCSN) is a non-profit (teaching) government hospital in Las Vegas, Nevada, United States. It is the only government-run hospital owned and operated by the Clark County Commission.

== Overview ==
The hospital was founded in 1931 and is affiliated with the UNLV School of Medicine and formerly affiliated with the University of Nevada, Reno School of Medicine. The Clark County Commission also sits as the Board of Hospital Trustees that governs the hospital.

== Services ==
As of 2010, UMC was the 18th largest public hospital in the United States, with a capacity of 564 beds for patients.

- Level I trauma center, the only designated Level I trauma center in Nevada. This is information has been updated. Asof April 14th 2026 UMC is not the only Level I in Nevada. Sunrise Hospital is also a Level I trauma center. Https://www.sunrisehealthinfo.com/about-us/newsroom/state-designates-sunrise-hospital-as-level-1-trauma-center State designates Sunrise Hospital as Level 1 Trauma Center] . The trauma center provides both adult and pediatric care over portions of four states (Nevada, California, Arizona, Utah).
- Burn care facility, the only one in Nevada, the Lions Burn Care Center.
- Orthopedic and Spine Institute
- Adult and Pediatric Emergency Department
- Physical Therapy
- Pulmonary Function Lab
- Cardiac Rehab
- Infusion Clinic
- UMC Online Care
- Children's Hospital of Nevada
- UMC Healthy Living Institute
- UMC Center for Transplantation, top ranked kidney transplant program in the United States
- UMC Quick Cares, several locations located throughout the Las Vegas Valley
- UMC Primary Care, providing Primary Care for the community
- UMC Wellness Center, the largest HIV clinic in the state of Nevada

== History ==
Previous names included:

- Clark County Indigent Hospital (1931)
- Clark County General Hospital
- Southern Nevada Memorial Hospital
- UMC was designated as the first Level I trauma center in 1998

== Heliport ==
University Medical Center of Southern Nevada Heliport
- IATA: none; ICAO: none; FAA LID: NV34

Summary
- Airport type: Helipad
- Operator: University Medical Center of Southern Nevada
- Location: Las Vegas, Nevada, U.S.
- Elevation AMSL: 2,096 ft (639 m)
- Coordinates: 36°09′35.1″N 115°09′57.7″W
- Interactive map of University Medical Center of Southern Nevada Heliport

Helipads
| Number | Length | | Surface |
| Number | ft | m | Surface |
|---|---|---|---|
| H1 | 50 | 15 | Pierced steel planking |

A heliport is available for emergency air ambulance service.

== Notable individuals treated ==
- Brent Thurman, 25, a professional bull rider, died on December 17, 1994, six days after suffering severe cranial and facial injuries after being stomped on by the bull he rode during the last day of the 1994 National Finals Rodeo. He spent six days in a coma and on life support before succumbing to his injuries.
- Butch Laswell, 37, a professional motorcycle stunt rider, died on March 10, 1996, after succumbing to injuries he sustained during a dangerous motorcycle stunt that went wrong. The stunt was filmed and witnessed live in front of a crowd of spectators. He died en route to the hospital in a Flight for Life helicopter.
- Tupac Shakur, 25, died on September 13, 1996, of complications from gunshot wounds from a drive-by shooting after having been in critical condition for six days.
- Roy Horn, 64, of Siegfried & Roy was stabilized here after he was attacked by one of his own tigers on October 3, 2003. He was transferred to UCLA Medical Center in Los Angeles, California for recovery and rehabilitation.
- Dan Wheldon, 33, was airlifted to the trauma center after a 15-car pile-up crash at the Las Vegas Motor Speedway during the final race of the 2011 IZOD IndyCar season on October 16, 2011. He was pronounced dead from blunt force trauma to his head at 1:54 pm. of complications from injuries sustained after a race accident.
- Kenny Guinn, 73, Governor of Nevada from 1999 to 2007, died on July 22, 2010, of complications from injuries sustained after falling from a roof of his Las Vegas home and possibly following from a heart attack.
- Chris Giunchigliani's husband, Gary Gray, 69, died on April 9, 2015, of complications from injuries sustained after a car accident caused by Gray himself drifting across the center line and crashing his red Ford pickup truck head-on into a white Jeep on State Route 157 eastbound, just northwest of Las Vegas. He was airlifted to the trauma center and later pronounced dead. The driver of the white Jeep was in stable condition. Gray and Giunchigliani were married on June 20, 1987.
- Donald Schieve, 82, died on May 2, 2015, of complications from injuries sustained after severe burns caused by a travel trailer that caught on fire and was owned and operated by Schieve himself in Bullhead City, Arizona. He was airlifted to the burn care facility and later pronounced dead after having been in critical condition for 4 days. Schieve was a former employee of Washoe Health Systems (now Renown Health) at Washoe Medical Center (now Renown Regional Medical Center) and the father of former KOLO-TV morning anchor and reporter Amanda Sanchez (née Schieve) and Reno mayor Hillary Schieve.
- UMC treated 104 of the injured people following the 2017 Las Vegas shooting.
- UMC made precautionary checks on British Formula One driver Lando Norris after his crash during the 2023 Las Vegas Grand Prix, and was later discharged on the same day.
