= Gerald and Charlene Gallego =

American serial killers

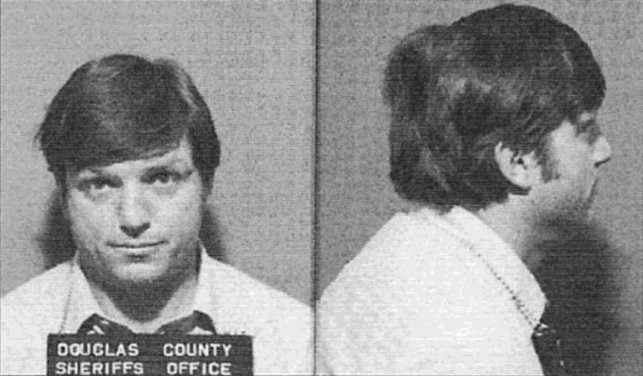
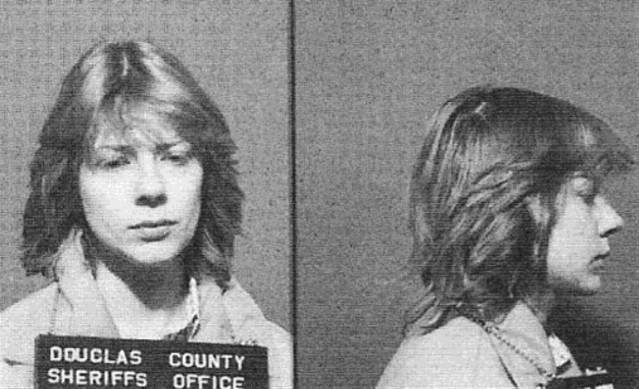
- Gerald and Charlene in their November 1980 mugshots
- Born: Gerald Gallego: July 17, 1946 Sacramento, California, U.S.; Charlene Williams: October 19, 1956 (age 70) Stockton, California, U.S.
- Died: Gerald: July 18, 2002 (aged 56); Renown Regional Medical Center, Reno, Nevada, U.S.
- Other names: Stephen and Charlene Feil; Sex Slave Killers
- Children: 1
- Convictions: Gerald; Armed robbery Lewd and lascivious acts with a child First degree murder with special circumstances (2 counts); First degree murder (2 counts); Charlene; Second degree murder (2 counts)
- Penalty: Gerald; Death; Charlene; 16 years in prison, later paroled

Details
- Victims: 10 confirmed
- Span of crimes: September 11, 1978 – November 2, 1980
- Country: United States
- States: California; Nevada; Oregon
- Date apprehended: November 17, 1980

Gerald Armond Gallego (July 17, 1946 – July 18, 2002) and Charlene Adell Gallego (née Williams; born October 19, 1956), also known as Stephen and Charlene Feil and nicknamed the Sex Slave Killers, were American serial killers who abducted, raped, tortured, and murdered at least ten people between 1978 and 1980. The couple abducted their victims from areas near the Interstate 80 freeway running through California and Nevada with the sole exception of a victim killed in Oregon. Typically, Charlene lured victims to the couple's vehicle with an offer of selling drugs, invitations to a party, or a request for help distributing flyers. Gerald would then restrain, abduct, and rape them before killing them with a variety of methods, most commonly by shooting.

Gerald and Charlene were nicknamed the "Sex Slave Killers" because of the prolonged torture the victims suffered, which prosecutors asserted was due to the couple scouting for an ideal sex slave. Charlene accepted a plea bargain whereby she agreed to testify against Gerald and was sentenced to sixteen years and eight months imprisonment in Nevada in February 1983. Gerald was convicted of four murders—two in California and two in Nevada—and received death sentences in both states. His death sentence in Nevada was overturned in 1997 after an appeal but was reimposed two years later. He died of cancer while on death row in Nevada in 2002.

Charlene was released from prison in 1997 upon the conclusion of her sentence and moved back to California, where she maintains a low profile. She continues to deny culpability in the murders and claims she only participated in them out of fear.

== Early life ==
=== Gerald Gallego ===
Gerald Armond Gallego was born on July 17, 1946, in Sacramento, California, to Gerald Albert Gallego and Lorraine Evelyn (née Pullen, later Bulgar and Davies). Gerald's mother was a sex worker while his estranged father was a criminal who was imprisoned at San Quentin State Prison for auto theft at the time of his birth.

In June 1954, Gerald's father, an escaped convict from California, was sentenced to death in Mississippi for the murder of Ocean Springs police officer Ernest Beaugez, whom he killed the previous May. While on death row, he and another inmate bludgeoned corrections officer J.C. Landrum to death and escaped from prison, sparking an extensive manhunt. On March 3, 1955, at age 26, Gerald's father was executed in the gas chamber at Mississippi State Penitentiary, becoming the first person in the state's history executed with such procedure. Gerald was initially informed that his father had died in a car accident, and it would not be until the age of 16 that he learned his father's identity. Years later, after his own conviction for murder, Gerald told a court-appointed psychologist, "I have the feeling that my father is inside of me".

Gerald spent much of his childhood in the Sacramento suburb of Del Paso Heights before moving to Yolo County and then to Nevada County. During his formative years, his mother and her multiple boyfriends subjected him to constant physical abuse; several of her clients sexually abused him. Gerald often begged for physical affection such as hugging, and was frequently left unclean and hungry. At age 10 he was arrested for his first known felony offense—robbing a neighbor's home. Two years later, he sexually abused a six-year-old girl which resulted in him being sentenced to a youth facility, from which he was released in 1961.

As a student at Sacramento High School, Gerald was suspended numerous times for profanity, tardiness, and violating closed campus rules. He dropped out of school in the eleventh grade. In 1962, Gerald and his half-brother, David Raymond Hunt, were convicted of armed robbery and served one year at a youth facility. At age 18, he was arrested for auto theft and chose to represent himself in court, where he pleaded guilty and was sentenced to one year at the Deuel Vocational Institution. During his imprisonment, he learned of the death of another half-brother, which led to a mental breakdown and him exclaiming, "The only thing I care about is killing God." One day after his release, he and Hunt robbed and assaulted an acquaintance, a crime for which he served six months at the Sacramento County Jail. In 1968 or 1969, Gerald was involved in a car accident that damaged his frontal lobe and put him in a coma for a week.

In October 1969, Gerald and Hunt were arrested for participating in the armed robbery of a motel in Vacaville. While awaiting trial at Solano County jail, Gerald, Hunt, and another inmate managed to escape by sawing through their cell door and climbing down one of the prison balconies with a white sheet. The escape was short-lived, as a police tactical unit captured the escapees in a San Francisco apartment three days later. Gerald served three years in prison and was paroled in September 1973. He was discharged from parole in December 1975 and found employment as a truck driver. Following Hunt's release, he led an illegal marijuana operation in Oregon until his arrest and conviction for attempting to murder a couple near Fort Lewis, Washington.

=== Charlene Williams ===
Charlene Adell Williams was born on October 19, 1956, (Note: Some sources list her date of birth as October 10, but the California Birth Index and a 1956 issue of The Record confirm she was born on October 19.) in Stockton, California, to Charles and Mercedes (née Whorton) Williams. Raised in Sacramento, she was described as a smart, shy child from a supportive home with a steady source of income. Her father was a well-known businessman who served as the vice president of a chain of meat markets. As part of their professional lives, he and his wife frequently traveled.

Charlene was lauded in her early years for her academic performance, but at around 13 years old she started abusing amphetamine, marijuana and alcohol, and engaging in sex. She attended Rio Americano High School where she averaged a B letter grade, was a member of the California Scholarship Federation, and played the violin in the school orchestra, where she was regarded as talented enough to be invited to practice at the San Francisco Conservatory of Music. After graduating in 1974, she opened a furniture store in Folsom with the financial assistance of her mother and grandmother. She then enrolled at California State University majoring in psychology, but dropped out after one semester. Because of her overly flirty behavior with male co-workers, she was disliked at work and developed a reputation as a nymphomaniac.

== Prior relationships ==
=== Gerald ===
In his early teens, Gerald developed a sexual relationship with his mother's sister-in-law, who had been a mistress to his father. In March 1964, Gerald, aged 17, fathered a daughter with a 21-year-old woman. He married the woman less than a week later in a ceremony held in Sacramento. The relationship quickly soured due to repeated domestic abuse and they separated in December. Gerald was awarded temporary custody of his daughter, and she sometimes lived with him at his grandmother's home while his ex-wife retained permanent custody. Years later, Gerald sexually molested and orally raped his daughter, as well as one of her friends, over an approximate seven-year period.

In 1966, Gerald married a 24-year-old waitress he had met in West Sacramento. After less than a month, the woman filed for divorce, alleging an incident where Gerald chased her around with a knife. During divorce proceedings, the woman learned that Gerald was only 19 years old, even though he had told her he was 27. Months later, Gerald met a single mother at the laundromat where she worked. They married in October 1967, but likewise with his previous marriages, it fell apart due to abuse. The woman, who had been carrying Gerald's baby, later suffered a miscarriage.

In March 1969, Gerald married his fourth wife, who sued for divorce and won custody of his daughter after just several months together. She described Gerald's personality resembling that of Jekyll and Hyde. After the marriage ended, Gerald began living with a young woman who would later visit him in prison after his conviction for armed robbery. A year after his release from prison, in 1974, Gerald married his fifth wife, a 19-year-old woman. On the application, he wrote that he was three years younger than he was at the time. He and the woman separated in October 1977, with the divorce being finalized a year later, after he married Charlene.

=== Charlene ===
On her 18th birthday, Charlene married her first husband, a United States Army soldier, but the marriage was annulled after just one day after the man was deployed thousands of miles away to West Germany. Two years later, Charlene married her second husband, a former soldier, who later asserted that Charlene was desperate for a threesome between the pair and a prostitute because she was enamored with lesbian sex. During the marriage, Charlene suffered severe lung damage due to breathing in fumes at her workplace, a local food market. She later attempted suicide. Her husband, unhappy that Charlene's parents interfered in their relationship, initiated their divorce. He later remarked that her parents comforted her by telling her, "He's just another one of those guys who just uses you."

Charlene next married a soldier she described as a "mother's boy"; she soon became bored with him, and they separated. Soon after she embarked in an extramarital affair with a married man, but this relationship ended after she asked whether the pair might have sex with his wife. Charlene attempted suicide after the breakup but survived. Not long after, she met Gerald.

== Relationship ==
On September 29, 1977, (Note: Other sources report the date as September 10.) Gerald and Charlene met in a poker room at the Black Stallion club in Orangevale, California, and he invited her back to his duplex that night. The following day, Charlene received a dozen long-stemmed roses and a card reading, "To a very sweet girl – Gerry." Within a week she decided to move in with Gerald. Charlene acted as the submissive partner in their sadomasochistic relationship, and although she later testified that she detested the experience, Gerald engaged in rough intercourse and sodomy with her. Charlene allegedly became enamored by Gerald's machismo and started partaking in his deviant fantasies.

After the couple had been living together for a few months, Gerald brought home a sixteen-year-old exotic dancer to Charlene, and they had a threesome together. Gerald made sure Charlene and the teenager did not touch each other and only touched him, but afterwards when he arrived home from work as a bartender, he discovered that Charlene and the teenager were having sex alone. After throwing the teenager out of an open window in a rage, he beat Charlene. Afterward Gerald refused to have intercourse with Charlene, claiming he had lost his libido and had become impotent; she suspected he was sleeping with female bar patrons and had lost interest in her as a result.

Eventually, Gerald told Charlene that he required a pair of "sex slaves" to keep him excited. This knowledge did not alarm Charlene, however, and she purchased a .25 Automatic pistol in December 1977. The following month, Gerald sought to divorce his wife so he could marry Charlene. In the summer of 1978, Charlene informed Gerald she was pregnant but was met with dissatisfaction and had an abortion not long after.

Years later, Charlene alleged that Gerald regularly abused her by slapping her, pulling her hair, and grabbing her throat. Around 1978, Gerald attempted to strangle Charlene, but stopped when her mother hit him over the head with the butt of a gun. In August 1980, Gerald and Charlene had an argument that escalated into physical violence, waking up neighbors and resulting in Charlene's parents conducting a rescue of her and forcing her to move out of Gerald's apartment. Despite the abuse, Charlene made no attempt to alert law enforcement and later acknowledged that she lured young women to Gerald to become the "No. 1 woman in his life."

=== Outstanding warrant for sex crimes ===
On September 27, 1978, Gerald's daughter and her friend reported their sexual abuse to a detective sergeant at the home of Gerald's mother Lorraine. The next day, Gerald and Charlene arrived at the home and Lorraine informed them about what had happened. He initially told his mother that he wanted to surrender, but when his step-father came home and became enraged at the sight of him, grabbing a rifle in the process, he and Charlene fled the premises and drove to Reno, Nevada. Three days later, Gerald and Charlene married in Reno in a wedding ceremony held at the Washoe County Courthouse with Charlene's parents in attendance. On October 9, an arrest warrant was issued by the Butte County Sheriff's Office charging Gerald with rape, incest, sodomy, and oral occupation. Around this time, he assumed the alias "Stephen Robert Feil"—named after one of Charlene's cousins whom she felt resembled him (Note: Stephen Robert Feil is Charlene's third cousin who was an officer with the California State Police. He would later become aware that his identify was stolen after having his license suspended due to an accident Gerald was involved in under his name. He had previously only met Charlene once at a funeral.)—to avoid the charges.

The couple briefly lived in Houston, Texas, from late 1978 to early 1979. There, Gerald found work as a bartender; coworkers described him as quiet, sometimes angry, but often nice. He quit his job after beating a fellow bartender in a drunken state. Afterwards, Charlene's father offered her a job as a receptionist for a meat firm in Reno, and Gerald a job as a truck driver for the same firm. The couple only held their jobs for a few months before quitting.

The couple returned to Sacramento in October 1979 and rented an apartment on Woodhollow Way. Gerald soon obtained a job as a bartender at the Bob-Les club, where he was recalled often firing his gun into the ceiling to wake up sleeping patrons. Around this time, Charlene wanted to take on the alias of "Charlene Feil", and the couple married for a second time under the Feil alias on June 1, 1980. Charlene soon became pregnant with another child; the baby, Gerald Gallego Jr., was born after the couple's arrest for murder.

== Murders ==
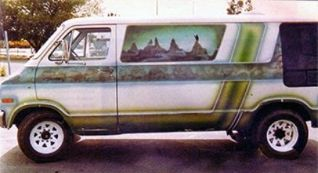
The Dodge Ram Van used by the Gallegos during a majority of their abductions

Between 1978 and 1980, Gerald and Charlene Gallego murdered at least ten people in three states. All of the victims were aged between 13 and 34, all but one were female and most were killed in California. The couple typically cruised around the West Coast along Interstate 80 in Charlene's 1973 Dodge Ram Van and observed young women and girls as potential victims. Typically, it was Charlene who lured their targets into the van using various ruses, including duping them into thinking they were only selling drugs.

In later years, prosecutors asserted, along with Charlene herself, that the couple were on the hunt for an ideal sex slave so that Gerald could indulge in his sexual sadism. The couple restrained their victims, drove to secluded locations and killed them following prolonged periods of continuous sexual assault and psychological torture. The victims were killed usually by shooting, bludgeoning and on one occasion strangulation.

=== First victims ===
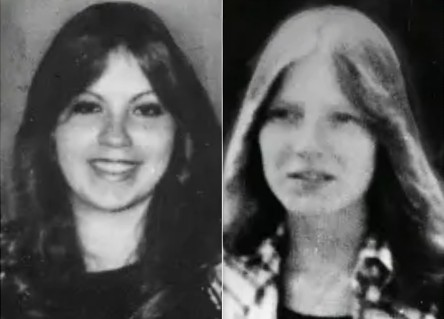
Kippi Vaught (left) and Rhonda Sheffler

Gerald and Charlene killed their first confirmed victims on September 11, 1978. They had staked out the Country Club Plaza in Sacramento and noticed two Vista Nueva High School students, Kippi Jacquelyn Vaught (16) and Rhonda Lee Scheffler (17), leaving a shoe store. Charlene approached the two, said she was inviting them to a party, and brought them to the van, where Gerald brandished his pistol and forced them into the back.

The girls were bound with tape around their arms and ankles and then were repeatedly sexually assaulted by Gerald, while Charlene drove to a secluded area in the Sierra Foothills near Baxter, sixty-five miles east of Sacramento. When they arrived, Gerald ordered Charlene to return to Sacramento alone, clean out the van, switch vehicles and come back at around midnight. She did what was requested and also visited a friend during that time. Now alone with Vaught and Scheffler, Gerald forced the girls into a clearing and repeatedly raped Sheffler for hours as Vaught was forced to watch. (Note: Gerald remarked that he did not rape Vaught because she was the heavier of the two.)

Charlene returned to Baxter at around 10:40 p.m. and signaled Gerald to come out from hiding by honking the horn and flashing the car lights. Gerald told her that he was glad she came back because he was cold. Vaught and Sheffler were forced into the back seat of the car as the Gallegos drove to Sloughhouse, where Gerald ordered them out of the vehicle. He asked that Charlene stay in the vehicle and turn up the radio and subsequently forced the girls to cross a field to a ditch, where he struck Vaught with a tire iron before swinging around and assaulting Scheffler. Finally, he pulled out his pistol and shot each girl once in the head.

Vaught made an attempt to flee as Gerald was leaving because the gunshot had only lightly grazed her skull; she was killed when he went back and fired three more shots into her head. He shot several more times at the bodies after noticing they were "still wiggling". Afterwards, Gerald and Charlene ransacked their purses and returned to Sacramento later that day, discarding their firearm, the tire iron, and the purses in a river. Gerald pounded on the barrel of the firearm beforehand in an attempt to destroy its identifying characteristics. The girls' bodies would be found fifteen yards apart two days later by a farmer.

Before her murder, in December 1977, Vaught and a group of other teenagers scared off a masked man from breaking into the home of a woman in Foothill Farms. Investigators believed the individual was the East Area Rapist, a serial rapist and serial killer active in Sacramento County at the time; however, others believed the individual Vaught interrupted was a copycat. At the time of their murders, Vaught's father had been a slated trial witness against a heroin dealer in Rancho Cordova who would ultimately plead guilty, and it was assumed that the girls were killed in an act of retribution, although investigators discovered no evidence supporting this theory.

=== Nevada murders ===
Nine months later, on June 24, 1979, Gerald and Charlene staked out the Washoe County Fair in Reno, Nevada, during an annual rodeo. Gerald, who opted to wait in the van, instructed Charlene to approach any petite female with preferably long dark hair and lure them back to the van with the ruse that they would earn money by distributing flyers. Charlene managed to dupe 14-year-old Brenda Lynne Judd and 13-year-old Sandra Kaye Colley to follow her to the van, where Gerald forced them inside at gunpoint and Charlene took control of the vehicle. On Interstate 80, Charlene drove the van northeast of Reno as Gerald sexually assaulted the girls in the back. Charlene eventually parked the van in the remote Humboldt Sink area. Over the next several hours, Gerald rested and watched Charlene force the girls to perform sex acts on each other. He then dragged Colley towards a dry stream bed after he removed a shovel from under their van's seat and yanked her out of the car. He then crept up behind Colley and repeatedly struck her in the head with a shovel. Charlene would later recall in court the assault, describing it as "a loud splat like a flat rock hitting mud, and the girl sank to her knees and slowly toppled over on her face."

After killing Judd, Gerald dug a large pit in Hallelujah Junction, California, placed the girls' naked bodies inside, and covered the pit with a rock. The Reno Police Department initially listed the teenagers as runaways, citing an incorrect reported sighting of one of the girls alive days after their disappearance. It would not be until Charlene confessed to their murders in 1982 that foul play would be determined, but their bodies remained missing for more than two decades. (Note: When confessing to the murders, Charlene could not remember the exact location of the bodies but stated they were buried near Susanville, California. Judd and Colley's remains would be discovered roughly fifty miles south of Susanville on November 20, 1999, by a tractor operator, and formal identification was concluded in 2000.) At a certain point in 1979, Gerald and Charlene abducted and robbed a lone male from a parking lot. They ultimately spared this victim and dropped him off at a different location.

On March 26, 1980, Charlene purchased an FIE gun; she returned two days later with an unidentified woman to arrange to buy a beretta instead. On the afternoon of April 23, Gerald and Charlene engaged in another domestic dispute. The following morning, Gerald awoke Charlene demanding "I want a girl! Get up!" While he remained irritated at her throughout the day, the couple spent some time together driving around Citrus Heights, California, until they came upon two girls exiting the Sunrise Mall: seventeen-year-olds Stacy Ann Redican and Karen Lynn Chipman-Twiggs, two high school dropouts from Del Paso Heights.

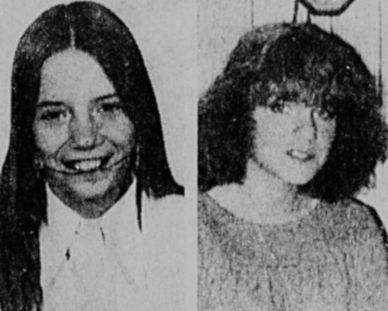
Karen Chipman-Twiggs (left) and Stacey Redican

On the pretext of smoking some marijuana, Charlene approached the two females and invited them to travel with her in the van, to which they enthusiastically accepted. Gerald met the girls with a .357 Magnum pistol as they entered the van. He quickly commanded Charlene to drive and ordered the girls to undress. Gerald tied both up with a macramé rope, pocketed $77 from one of their purses, and then raped both. After he finished, he had Charlene drive to a store where he purchased a hammer, then ordered her to drive to Limerick Canyon in eastern Pershing County, Nevada. The Gallegos were familiar with the area as they had gone camping there the previous summer. He led the girls one at a time into the woods carrying the hammer and a shovel, bludgeoning both to death.

Afterwards, Gerald forced Charlene to view the graves. Charlene claimed that she saw movement, but Gerald insisted that both girls were dead. The following morning, he purchased breakfast for him and Charlene with the victims' money, remarking that "breakfast was on them." Later that day, the couple traveled to Stateline and stayed at Harrah's Lake Tahoe hotel for one night before returning to California. The animal-ravaged bodies of Redican and Chipman-Twiggs were found over three months later by picnickers. They were fully clothed and badly decomposed, and an autopsy confirmed they were raped and suffered massive and fatal head injuries from a blunt instrument.

=== Oregon murder ===
Shortly after, Gerald and Charlene returned to California and settled back into their Woodhollow Way apartment in Sacramento. In early June 1980, around the time of their second marriage, Charlene informed Gerald she was pregnant. Ecstatic to hear the news, he took her on their second honeymoon in Southern Oregon. On June 6, as they were passing through Gold Beach, the Gallegos offered a ride to hitchhiker Linda Teresa Aguilar (21), the mother of a one-year-old and four-months pregnant.

Aguilar had accepted the couple's offer and was traveling with them in their van until Gerald brandished a revolver while Charlene was driving. The couple eventually stopped just off of U.S. Route 101, where Gerald told Charlene to get out and "walk around for a while" while he tied Aguilar's wrists and ankles with a nylon cord, raped her and then bludgeoned her into unconsciousness. After obtaining a spare hubcap from his vehicle, Gerald used it as a shovel to dig a shallow grave on Myers Creek Beach, where he placed Aguilar's body and attempted to conceal it by kicking sand and placing a large driftwood log over her. Relatives reported Aguilar missing on June 20 and German tourists found her body two days later. An examination revealed that she may have been buried alive since sand had been found in her mouth, throat and nose. An eyewitness to her abduction gave a detailed description of the van she was last seen getting into.

=== Return to California ===
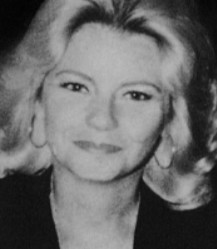
Virginia Mochel

On the afternoon of July 15, Gerald and Charlene drove to a teenage dance hall in Roseville in search for further victims, but ended up leaving due to the presence of various boys and men. Two days later, after spending several hours fishing in the California Delta, the couple stopped by the Sail Inn bar in West Sacramento, where they abducted cocktail waitress Virginia Maxine Mochel (34) that afternoon. They had previously been acquainted with Mochel as she had frequently served drinks to them.

After initially telling Charlene he was going to rob the bar and "get [Mochel] too", they kidnapped Mochel as she walked through the parking lot and bound her with fishing line. Gerald sexually assaulted her in the back of the van as she pleaded with them to let her go, saying she was concerned for her children at home. After the assault, Gerald ordered Charlene to turn up the radio and not turn around as he strangled Mochel. The couple discarded her body near a pond outside Clarksburg. Two weeks after the murder, the couple, presenting themselves as the "Feils", sold their van to an Orangevale couple for $2,300. They planned to send the couple papers on shocks they had installed and a warranty on a battery, but ultimately never contacted them again.

During the investigation, a detective contacted Gerald, who was still under the alias "Stephen Feil", as he was believed to be one of several patrons present at the bar the night of Mochel's disappearance. He told the detective he had been drunk that day and remembered hardly anything other than fishing. Charlene would later vouch for Gerald by telling the detective he was a truck driver who was frequently out of town. Mochel's skeletal remains, still bound with nylon fishing line, were found three months later by two fishermen. Loops of cord from the victim's neck were admitted as proof of death by strangulation.

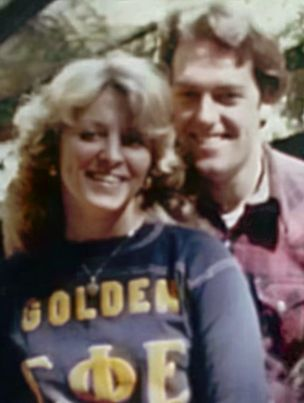
Mary Sowers and Craig Miller, the Gallegos' final victims

In the early morning hours of November 2, Gerald and Charlene prowled through the Arden Fair shopping center parking lot in Charlene's silver Oldsmobile and abducted Craig Raymond Miller (22) and his fiancée, Mary Elizabeth Sowers (21), as they were leaving a fraternity-sponsored dance at a nearby restaurant. Miller and Sowers were students at California State University, Sacramento, after Sowers had transferred to the university from Shasta College. She was the runner-up in the 1978 Maid of Shasta County contest and was the daughter of Hal Sowers, a nuclear physicist.

Gerald approached them while brandishing a .25 caliber Beretta and ordered the couple to enter the Gallegos' vehicle. When a witness, Andy Beal, attempted to intervene, Charlene slapped him across the face and told him he had "no business" being there. After taking them to a remote location near Folsom State Prison, Gerald ordered Miller out of the car. As Miller turned to approach the front of the car, Gerald shot him in the back of the head, which was followed by two more shots as he lay lifeless on the ground; his body would later be found near Bass Lake, California.

After reentering the vehicle, Gerald ordered Charlene to drive to their apartment. There, he took Sowers, whose hands were bound by her hair ribbon, into the bedroom and raped her for hours as Charlene waited in the living room. After reemerging, Gerald ordered Charlene to drive him and Sowers to a rural area near Roseville, where he forced Sowers out of the car, walked her into the woods and fatally shot her three times at point blank range.

A friend of Miller and Sowers who had witnessed their abduction memorized the car's license plate number and alerted authorities. Police used this information to track down the vehicle, which was registered to Charlene, to her parents' home in Sacramento. On November 2, police visited the home and questioned Charlene, who claimed to have no knowledge of the missing couple, and police did not arrest her. That same day, Miller's body was discovered at Bass Lake. A witness to the abduction identified Gerald in a photo lineup.

== Fugitives from justice ==
By the time police went to arrest Gerald and Charlene, they had fled to Reno and ditched their car at the Circus Circus Reno parking lot. Shortly after, the couple emerged as suspects in the murder of Mochel after her name was found on an envelope in their car. Detectives soon realized that they had unknowingly interviewed the Gallegos during the initial investigation into her disappearance, while Gerald was using the alias "Stephen Robert Feil," and both offered an alibi claiming to have either been fishing or out of town around the time she disappeared. On November 7, the FBI charged the Gallegos with unlawful flight to avoid prosecution.

Detectives tracked down the Orangevale couple who had purchased Charlene's van in August, and took it into possession; at first nothing was found, but the couple notified detectives that when they had first purchased the vehicle, they had discovered dark stains on a sheet and a foam-rubber mattress, and had kept those items in their garage. When turned over to authorities, forensic analyses on the items determined the stains were of human blood. Police subsequently issued a search of Gerald's residence and uncovered a box of .25 caliber Winchester Western shells, with nine shells missing. During their fugitive state, Charlene called attorney Dan Sullivan and proclaimed innocence. She said that while she preferred to surrender, Gerald would not let her. She claimed that Gerald was not concerned about the murder charges but rather the charges of rape, sodomy, and incest upon his daughter that were filed in Butte County in 1978.

Charlene's whereabouts were traced to Salt Lake City, Utah, where money addressed to her was collected at a Western Union office. While in Salt Lake City, Gerald acquired the IDs of two area residents after phoning their homes and claiming to be a Utah Republican Party official clarifying their voter registration information. Afterwards, the couple drove to Omaha, Nebraska, and checked into a local hotel. The FBI subsequently began surveillance on Charlene's parents, whom they believed had wired the money and suspected they would provide further aid to them. During the weekend of November 15–16, the parents were observed driving from Sacramento to Sparks, Nevada, where they entered a Western Union office and transferred $500 via wire to Omaha. With the knowledge that the Gallegos were expecting a wire transfer to Omaha's Western Union office, authorities alerted the bureau's Omaha field office.

== Arrest ==
On November 17, FBI agents detained Charlene as she entered the Omaha Western Union office. Gerald, who was waiting outside in his car, was detained as well. He refused to cooperate with the arresting agents and verbally insulted them. He later complained at a court hearing that the agents had "viciously pulled me off the streets" and tightened his handcuffs to the extent he lost blood circulation. At the hearing, United States magistrate judge Richard C. Peck imposed a $100,000 bond for the couple, despite pleas from Assistant United States Attorney Thomas Thalken for bond to be set at $500,000 each, arguing that the brutality of the charges weighed against them.

The couple waived extradition and were returned to Sacramento three days later. Both denied any involvement in the murders and maintained that their alibi at the time of Mochel's death was genuine.

=== Indictments ===
Gerald and Charlene were arraigned for the first-degree murder of Craig Miller on November 21, 1980. During the arraignment, Gerald, growing increasingly tired of spectators and reporters watching him, stood and shouted, "Haven't you got enough? We're not animals! What happened to a fair trial?" followed by Charlene yelling, "Why are you doing this to us?" Charlene's attorney Dan Sullivan held her in his arms as she began sobbing. Charlene pleaded not guilty to charges of kidnapping and murder while Gerald refused to enter a plea, and a not guilty plea was entered by Judge Edward Garcia on his behalf.

One day after the arraignment, the body of Sowers was discovered in a trench near Loomis, and the Gallegos were indicted with her murder on December 3. Due to discrepancies regarding whether or not Mochel was abducted within the 500-yard line of Sacramento County, a third murder charge was not filed despite physical evidence pinpointing the Gallegos.

Gerald was held without bail; Sullivan attempted to get a $25,000 bail for Charlene, which Garcia denied. Gerald maintained innocence in interviews with the media, but in private, notably during a conversation with Charlene's mother, he told of being on LSD when he and Charlene killed Miller and Sowers. Forensic analyses on a pair of Charlene's shoes revealed minute traces of human blood.

=== Legal representation ===
Charlene's parents initially paid for Sullivan's services after remortgaging their home. However, after they failed to obtain a second mortgage, Sullivan withdrew, and former U.S. House candidate Joseph Murphy agreed to take over Charlene's defense. Charlene, who at this point was nine-months pregnant, requested to be moved to a correctional center in Elk Grove to obtain medicine for her upcoming birth. On January 17, 1981, Charlene began experiencing labor pains and was rushed to UC Davis Medical Center. Soon enough, when it became clear that the baby's slow heartrate could become a problem, doctors were forced to perform a caesarean section and Charlene successfully delivered the baby.

Gerald was appointed public defender Donald L. Manning as his lawyer. In March, he asked the court to dismiss Manning because he wanted to represent himself, but the request was denied after hearings on April 6 and September 30. In late 1981, Manning made several attempts to get a change of venue for the trial on the basis that extensive publicity near Sacramento could affect jury selection, but his attempts were denied, and the trial was scheduled to begin in Sacramento on March 31, 1982. It was ultimately delayed following a court decision to grant further venue change motions by Manning.

During proceedings, Gerald and four other men awaiting trial at the Sacramento County Jail were linked to an alleged plot to overpower a rooftop correctional officer as part of an escape attempt. The plot was thwarted because the men were initially expecting one officer guarding the roof but were met with five.

== Confession ==
Following the birth of her baby, Charlene attempted to gain visitation rights so she could hold him during jailhouse visits. She was denied three times, lastly in June 1982. That same month, she consulted her lawyers, Hamilton Hintz Jr. and Fern Laethem, about additional crimes that she and Gerald had committed. Over the next several weeks, she affirmed her role in the murders of Miller, Sowers and Mochel, offering to further admit to detectives her culpability in seven other homicides. She provided them with the victims' descriptions and approximate locations, dates and times when these crimes occurred. She also spoke about several failed abductions, including the girl who she had encountered the day of Judd and Colley's murders, along with those of a boy and another unidentified female. She also recounted assisting Gerald in kidnapping and robbing a man in 1979.

Upon hearing the news and believing that Redican and Chipman-Twiggs may have been victims of the Gallegos, Lovelock District Attorney Richard A. Wagner interviewed Charlene; she informed him that the remaining strand of the macramé rope used to bind the two girls laid in the trunk of Gerald's sports car, and investigators were able to recover it. Afterwards, Wagner filed two first-degree murder charges against Gerald. He was later charged with the murders of Judd and Colley in Washoe County despite the continued absence of their bodies. Afterwards, and during the remaining stretch of the pretrial process, Charlene was under immunity.

=== Plea bargain ===
By fall 1982, Charlene's attorneys were able to convince prosecutors in several jurisdictions to allow her to testify against Gerald in a plea bargain that reduced her prison sentence to sixteen years and eight months in prison. Neither Gerald nor Charlene were indicted with the remaining murders of Vaught, Scheffler, Aguilar and Mochel, but the cases were closed based on information provided by Charlene. However, evidence relating to the murders, such as fibers found on the bodies of Vaught and Scheffler matching fibers pulled from a carpet in the Gallegos' van, were ruled to be admissible at Gerald's upcoming trial. Around this time, Charlene dropped Gallego from her name and reembraced her surname after being informed that her marriage to Gerald had never been valid.

In late September, Superior Court Judge John Boskovich accepted a venue change motion by Manning, and Gerald's trial was moved to Contra Costa County. The following month, during a closed hearing, Gerald fired Manning, and Contra Costa County Superior Court Judge Norman Spellberg allowed Gerald to act as his own attorney. In his first action, Gerald sought to restrict Charlene from testifying against him at trial, contending that the judge who had originally granted her plea bargain lacked authority, because a new one had been assigned to the case, and that her proposed sentence of sixteen years and eight months was too short for a death penalty case. Ultimately, a three-member judge panel ruled unanimously to deny his request. Gerald did succeed in a motion to forbid the news media from filming certain portions of the trial, saying he was upset with the "day-by-day display of the life and legend of Gerald Gallego" and that extensive news coverage was the reason the trial was moved away from Sacramento where he had hoped to be tried.

On November 10, Charlene pleaded guilty to the second-degree murders of Craig Miller and Mary Sowers and was imposed a sixteen-year and eight-month sentence with time served. Three months later, on February 25, 1983, she pleaded guilty to the second-degree murders of Stacey Redican and Karen Chipman-Twiggs in Nevada and was imposed another sixteen-year and eight-month sentence.

== Trials ==
=== California ===
Gerald Gallego's trial for the murders of Mary Sowers and Craig Miller began on December 12, 1982, at the Contra Costa County Superior Court Building in Martinez, before Judge Spellberg. Sacramento Chief Deputy District Attorney James I. Morris, acting as prosecutor, sought the death penalty for Gerald.

During opening statements, Morris outlined the murders of Miller and Sowers and Gerald's sexual fantasies of abducting and raping young women. Morris called up Jeff Benner, an acquaintance of Miller and Sowers who had witnessed their abduction. On the stand, Morris identified Gerald as the perpetrator. In his rebuttal, Gerald repeatedly asked Benner if he was positive about the identification because of an earlier incident at a preliminary hearing where he accidentally identified a separate attorney as the kidnapper.

A centerpiece of the prosecution's evidence was the ballistics evidence tying Gerald's firearm to the bullets recovered at the crime scenes. At his workplace at the Bob-Les club in Sacramento, Gerald was known to have fired his gun into the ceiling to wake up sleeping patrons. On January 4, criminologist Alfred Biasotti testified on behalf of the prosecution that bullet shells recovered from the club's attic were matched to the bullets pulled from Miller's head. That same day, Torrey Johnson of the California Department of Justice testified that he analyzed the bullet shells and determined that distinctive markings proved they were fired from the same weapon. In his rebuttal, Gerald claimed that Johnson was referring to Charlene's .25 caliber pistol which was never located, although Johnson would clarify that a .25 caliber pistol was not used in the murders of Miller and Sowers, but said it may have been used in the murders of Vaught and Scheffler.

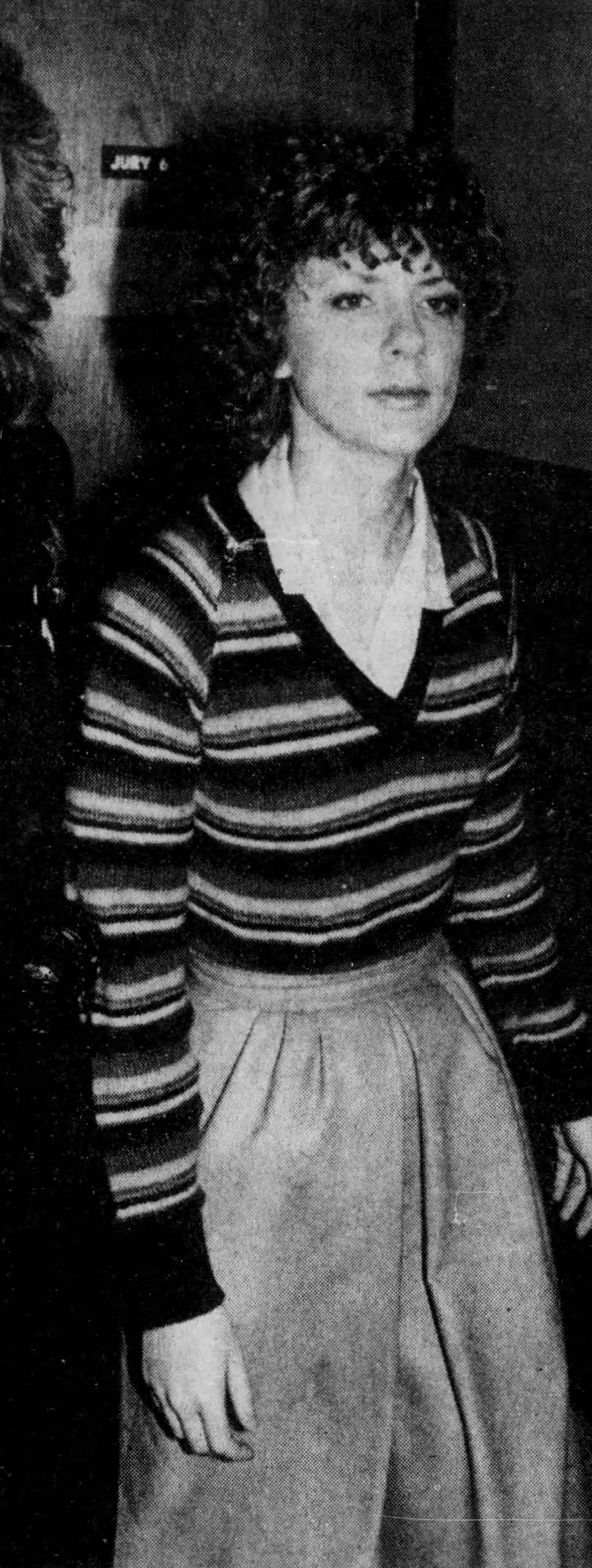
Charlene entering the Contra Costa County Superior Court Building during Gerald's trial

Gerald acknowledged he abducted both victims but claimed he only killed them out of self-defense, that Miller had attacked and tried to disarm him and he was forced to kill him, and that Charlene had killed Sowers to "cover-up the crime." While attempting to persuade the jury that he was too intoxicated at the time of the murders to be fairly judged, he called up psychiatrist Delbert Wilcox, who argued that Gerald's excessive drinking could have caused amnesia and hence why he could not remember exact details of the murders. Wilcox cited his conversations with Gerald, and when asked if he believed him, Wilcox responded "substantially." In his rebuttal, Morris called up another psychiatrist, Lee Coleman of the University of California, Berkeley, who dismissed Wilcox's claim and remarked that psychiatry "simply does not have the tools necessary to make such a judgement."

Charlene was slated to testify on behalf of the prosecution in January 1983. A month prior, her lawyers had visited the courtroom before the trial adjourned for the holiday break and spoke of being unhappy with their client's current security measures, citing Gerald's ability to roam free in the courtroom and his access to pens and water pitchers—which could potentially be used as weapons—when recommending extra protection. Due to her status as a key witness, Charlene was held in protective custody at Rio Cosumnes Correctional Center. Fourteen prisoners filed complaints alleging that she was receiving unfair special treatment as her cell contained a special television set that no other inmates had access to.

On January 10, Charlene took the stand. She testified that during their marriage Gerald had expected her "to be the lure for a young and beautiful woman" to fulfill his sexual fantasies. While she readily admitted to being an active accomplice in the kidnappings, she denied having participated in the murders and even claimed to have been under the influence of alcohol during a majority of them. When it was Gerald's turn to question Charlene, he was confrontational and promptly asked her if she had murdered the victims, to which she responded in the negative. Gerald also asked her what she thought about his sexual fantasies; "I thought you were crazy," she answered.

Three days later, during questioning from Gerald, Charlene broke down on the stand after he repeatedly asked her to describe the murders. She maintained that she had not seen the murder of Sowers but testified that she had witnessed Gerald fatally shoot Miller. Gerald subsequently asked her if she felt afraid of him following Miller's death, to which she responded "What did you expect me to feel? Yes, I was afraid". On January 17, Charlene returned to the stand, and Gerald promptly asked her why she had lied to investigators and engaged in a coverup, to which she responded, "Gerry, you know very well that you shot and killed those two kids." Gerald replied, "Isn't it a fact you entered this coverup willingly because you are in fact murderess?" As Charlene was replying loudly that Gerald was a liar, Spellberg interrupted the exchange and threatened to hold both in contempt of court if they continued. Supposedly, at one point during the trial, Gerald hid in one of the building's bathrooms in an attempt to avoid further questioning. After six days of questioning, Charlene left the courtroom sobbing.

Following closing arguments, on April 6, the jury began deliberations, and during that time Gerald sat in his cell read John Norman's Gor book series, which depicts an alternate world populated by slaves and women. After five days, the jury convicted Gerald on two counts of murder and two counts of kidnapping, with the jury finding that his convictions had met the special circumstances allowing him to be eligible for the death penalty. At the start of the penalty phase, Gerald requested an attorney and hired Richard Fathy, who attempted to portray his client as having a child-like mindset to the jury.

On May 12, Morris called up Gerald's nineteen-year-old daughter, who testified that she had suffered sustained sexual abuse by him over a seven-year period. Charlene took the stand again during the trial's penalty phase, where she recounted the murder of Aguilar, how Gerald raped her in their van before burying her alive and how he "had no tears in his eyes" after the fact. She also testified that, shortly after killing Mochel, Gerald bragged that "it was easy – just like the other one." Under cross-examination, Charlene acknowledged that she could have called for help during the time both victims were alive but claimed she was afraid of Gerald's "emotional control." In his final statement to the jury, Morris urged them to sentence Gerald to death, saying, "The man ought to have the opportunity, the sooner the better, to meet Gerald Albert Gallego. Then God can deal with his soul, whether or not he can swap stories with the man that he respects so much." On May 24, the jury took less than two hours to return a death verdict, which Spellberg formally imposed on June 21. At the sentencing, the judge cited Gerald's prior criminal offenses as representing "the failure of our system."

Following his sentencing, Gerald was moved to death row at San Quentin State Prison. Three months later, California Governor George Deukmejian signed an executive agreement ordering Gerald's extradition to Pershing County, Nevada, where he was to stand trial for the murders of Redican and Chipman-Twiggs. Due to court challenges, his extradition was delayed several times, which led prosecutor Richard Wagner to travel to San Quentin to negotiate. Ultimately, Justice Clinton White agreed to delay extradition once again in December 1983. Gerald's extradition to Nevada was finally carried out in January 1984. At his arraignment, he agreed to the appointment of public defender Thomas Perkins as his representing attorney. Wagner's efforts to prosecute Gerald earned him praise and a handshake from U.S. Senator Paul Laxalt.

=== Nevada ===
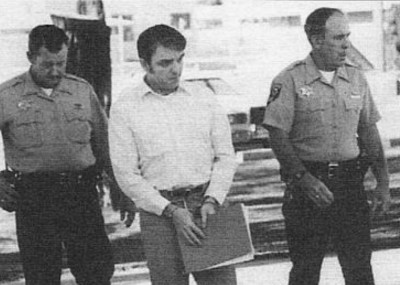
Gerald being escorted to his trial in Pershing County, Nevada, in 1984

Gerald's trial began on May 23, 1984, at the Pershing County Courthouse, before Superior Court Judge Llewellyn Young. For his first witness, Wagner called up Mildred Vaught, the mother of victim Kippi Vaught, who testified that she had become so enraged with Gerald that she had planned to kill him but did not follow through. Taking the stand on May 24, Charlene recounted the murders in detail and said the victims, who were aged 16 and 17, were "too old" to satisfy Gerald's sexual fantasies.

Besides Charlene's testimony, the prosecution presented four other pieces of evidence that implicated Gerald: a rope used for macramé found in his car was identical to the one used to tie the victims' wrists; records at Harrah's Lake Tahoe hotel showing that Gerald and Charlene had been in Nevada at the time; statements made by a cellmate of Gerald's which matched what Charlene had told authorities; and a photograph found in his possession which was found to have been taken at the exact site where the victims were buried.

The defense focused largely on attacking Charlene's credibility. Perkins mentioned that Charlene's statements regarding the murders of Kippi Vaught and Rhonda Scheffler contradicted the statements of four witnesses, who had initially told police that the girls were last seen getting into a car with Michigan license plates at around 3:15 p.m. the day they were kidnapped. In his rebuttal, Wagner argued that the witnesses had misidentified two separate girls as the kidnapped duo by presentencing a receipt that proved Sheffler was still present at the shoe store after 4:00 p.m. and that "Type A" seminal stains from a positive secretor located at the crime scene was consistent with Gerald's semen type.

The defense attempted to provide Gerald with an alibi by saying he was working at the Bob-Les club in Sacramento when the murders occurred. On June 5, Perkins called up the co-owner of the club, Steve Homa, who stated that Gerald was scheduled to work as a relief bartender during the workweek of April 21–25, 1980, but added that no existing records proved he had clocked in on those days. Therefore, Wagner was able to get Homa to admit he did not know if Gerald had been working at the time of the murders. They also called up a desk clerk for the Harrah's Lake Tahoe who testified that she could only produce a receipt that showed a "Charlene Williams" was at the hotel the day after the murders, although room service records showed that another person was staying with her.

The trial lasted for three weeks and was the most expensive trial in Pershing County history. Much of the trial costs were covered by donations by residents of Pershing County and other nearby cities, states, and even one from Papua New Guinea. The jury deliberated for three hours and forty minutes before returning their verdict. They found Gerald guilty on two counts of murder and two counts of aggravated kidnapping. He stared intently at the ceiling and heaved a loud sigh as the verdict was announced.

A plea by the defense to consider Gerald's possible brain abnormalities ultimately did not persuade the jury, as they recommended a death sentence on June 12. The jury also rendered two life sentences for the kidnapping convictions. Gerald's death sentence was formally imposed by Judge Young on June 25. As the sentence was announced, Gerald stood and shouted, "You sentenced me to death with no damn evidence at all!" During his imprisonment, Gerald accused Wagner of selling his life story to enrich himself and asked that the Nevada Attorney General and the State Bar of Nevada investigate him.

== Subsequent developments ==
Shortly after Gerald's convictions in Pershing County, prosecutors dismissed the remaining charges for the murders of Judd and Colley, citing concerns that Washoe County could not afford to pursue a death-penalty case and that the continued absence of the victims' bodies weakened the prospects for a successful trial. Judd's mother nevertheless said that she felt justice had been served with Gerald's conviction for other cases.

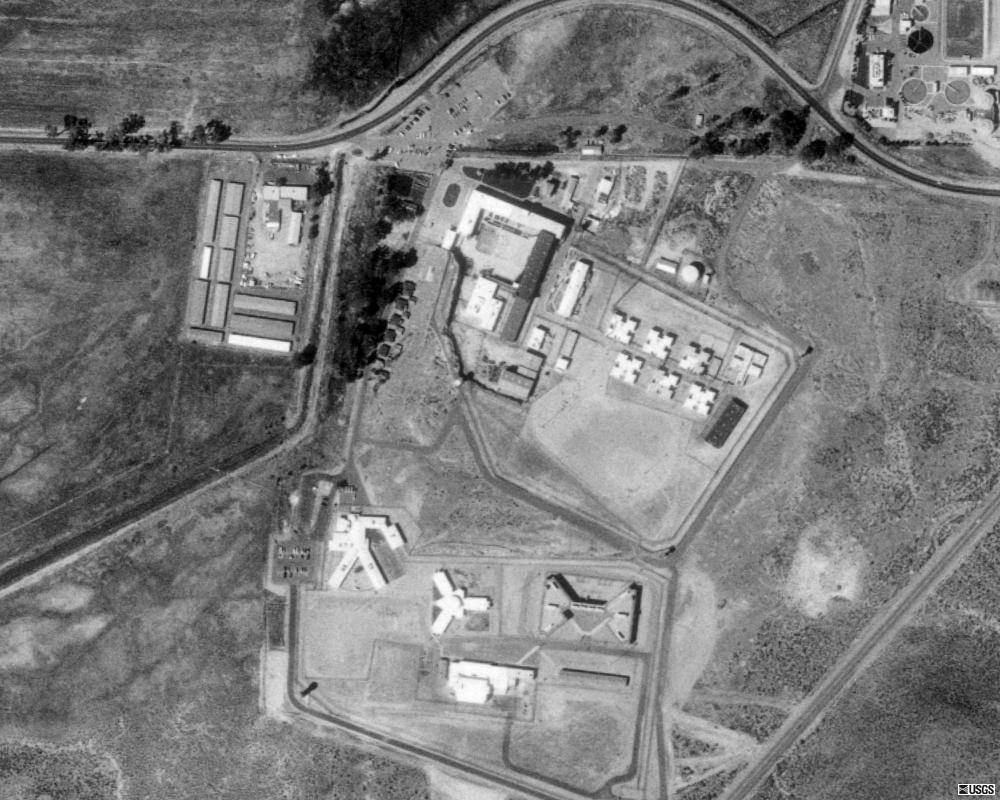
Nevada State Prison, where Gerald was initially imprisoned. Visible below is Nevada Women's Correctional Center where Charlene was imprisoned.

Gerald was imprisoned at Nevada State Prison in Carson City and was later moved into solitary confinement after informants linked him to an escape plot. On March 25, 1988, Gerald and convicted robber Robert Toston got into a physical altercation in the prison's exercise yard. He bit off a chunk of Toston's ear before guards fired multiple rounds of birdshot at them. In 1989 or 1990, he was transferred to death row at Ely State Prison. (Note: The Press Democrat reported his location as Nevada State Prison on September 11, 1989, and The Sacramento Bee reported it as Ely State Prison on August 5, 1990.)

Charlene's California convictions were vacated on May 7, 1984, by the Sacramento County Superior Court, after her attorneys successfully argued that there was no guarantee that the Nevada Department of Corrections would carry out her agreed-upon release date if she were to serve her sentence in California. She smiled as the ruling was announced and was returned to Nevada shortly after, where she was imprisoned at Nevada Women's Correctional Center, adjacent to Nevada State Prison. She regularly communicated by telephone with Richard Wagner, the prosecutor at Gerald's Pershing County trial. During her imprisonment, she attended classes relating to psychology, business and Icelandic literature at Western Nevada College and graduated with an associate's degree in applied science.

=== Post-sentencing appeals ===
Between 1985 and 2001, Gerald filed numerous appeals, citing issues such as jury prejudice and judicial errors. His first appeal, alleging that widespread publicity diminished his chances of getting a fair trial and that Charlene should have been forbidden from testifying, was unanimously dismissed on December 20, 1985, by the Nevada Supreme Court. He was scheduled to be executed on February 6, 1987, by lethal injection; the execution was stayed by the U.S. District Court of Nevada after Gerald filed a federal habeas corpus petition.

In 1993, Gerald filed a seventeen-page appeal seeking to overturn his convictions in Nevada, citing issues such as jury prejudice and errors on the judge's behalf. Although the Nevada Attorney General urged the court to deny the request, District Court Judge Howard D. McKibben held a hearing on the matter in October 1995 and ordered an investigation into Charlene at the request of Gerald. McKibben ultimately rejected the appeal after four months of hearing arguments. Gerald further sought to appeal on the grounds that the trial had been unfair due to the extensive publicity tampering jury selection.

In September 1997, Gerald's death sentence in Nevada was overturned by the Ninth U.S. Circuit Court of Appeals after it was discovered that jurors had been incorrectly informed that he could have been eligible for parole if not sentenced to death. The United States Supreme Court subsequently denied a motion by Nevada Attorney General Frankie Sue Del Papa to reinstate his sentence, and motions for a new penalty hearing were allowed to move forward. Clark County District Judge John S. McGroarty ordered Gerald to undergo a psychological evaluation to determine if he was competent enough to move forward to a new penalty hearing. During court appearances, Gerald often argued with McGroarty and ignored some his questions, and during one appearance sat facing an exit door with his back turned to the judge. A subsequent mental health evaluation conducted on behalf of Gerald's defense council reported that he endured severe organic brain damage that had deteriorated markedly from 1984 onward. At an April 1999 evaluation, psychologist Dr. Myla Young would determine that Gerald was delusional, psychotic and possibly schizophrenic, a similar result that she had originally reported during a 1994 evaluation. Nevertheless, McGroarty ruled that Gerald was competent enough to participate in the hearing but rejected his proposal that he represent himself.

The new penalty hearing began on September 20, 1999. Gerald's defense opted for the minimum sentence of life with the chance of parole, arguing that he was no longer a danger to himself or others, while prosecuting attorney Brent Kolvet outlined the murders in detail and moved swiftly through a string of witnesses that included former homicide investigators and forensic specialists. On September 21, Kolvet called up Donald Redican, the father of victim Stacey Redican, who stated that his daughter had suffered before her death, that she had never lived long enough to accomplish any of her goals and that his other three daughters viewed Gerald as a real-life monster. The defense, who called up no witnesses, tried to paint Gerald as having had an upbringing riddled with abuse. Reportedly, Gerald showed dissatisfaction with his lawyers as he wanted them to call up numerous witnesses, including Charlene. The defense raised questions surrounding Charlene's plea bargain regarding whether it minimized her involvement in the murders, while Kolvet defended the plea bargain, saying it was "essential."

Gerald chose not to take the stand in his own defense after learning he would be prohibited from denying his guilt or rebutting certain facts, so when the defense rested its case, he opted to make a statement to the jury. In his statement, he admitted his guilt and apologized to the victims' families. On September 23, the jury deliberated for one hour before finding that Gerald should again be sentenced to death, and Judge McGroarty formally imposed the death sentence on November 16. A new execution date was set for January 17, 2000, which was stayed due to an automatic appeal. His final two appeals, filed in May and July 2001, were both denied by the Nevada Supreme Court.

=== Charlene's release ===
By 1991, Charlene had amassed enough good time credit to warrant early release, and she was due to be released on September 3 of that year, sparking criticism from Gerald's legal team. Charlene herself maintained that she wanted to stay imprisoned until the end of her sentence, but Nevada prison officials stated they had no choice but to release her. Because her plea deal stated she had to serve out the entirety of her sentence, California prosecutors planned to issue an arrest warrant for Charlene in relation to the murders of Miller and Sowers upon her release. To avoid this she consulted her court-appointed lawyer, who asked that she remain in prison for another six years. In August, the courts accepted the request, and her release date was quickly rescheduled. Her next scheduled release date of June 13, 1996, would too be rescheduled.

Charlene was released on the morning of July 17, 1997, and assumed a new identity. She was bound by a law to register as an ex-felon in the community she chose to reside. She remarked to a reporter after her release that "there were victims who died, and there were victims who lived. It's taken me a hell of a long time to realize that I'm one of the ones who lived." She gave her first televised interview in February 1998 to Leeza Gibbons. Charlene told Gibbons she was a battered spouse and had no option but to assist Gerald in the murders, claiming "he was never away. I was never out of his sight once", which detective Ray Biondi clarified was not true. Before the interview airing on Gibbons' talk show Leeza, it was shown to a studio audience who booed and hissed at Charlene's assertions.

== Additional victims ==
In June 1984, Charlene told The Sacramento Bee that she strongly believed Gerald had committed more murders than the ten she had witnessed. She recalled various instances where he disappeared for hours with no explanation, how he discussed how to get away with "a perfect crime" in conversations before their first confirmed murders and recalled an incident while the couple lived in Houston where he berated her for snooping through his briefcase and uncovering numerous Polaroid pictures, the contents of which he could not explain.

The Gallegos are known to have stalked or attempted to abduct several intended victims and are also suspected in additional murders:

- On February 13, 1978, Essie Margarette Hiett, a 47-year-old cardroom worker, vanished in Oroville after getting into a car accident on Palermo-Honcut Road, located less than three miles from where Gerald lived at the time. Her body was never found, but authorities presume she was kidnapped and killed. A fingerprint from an unknown individual was collected from her car, however it was not a match to Gerald.
- The Charley Project weblog speculated that Gerald and Charlene had murdered 16-year-old Sandra Kaye Butler, who disappeared on June 26, 1978, while making her way to the Greenbrae Shopping Centre in Sparks, Nevada. Butler was seen as a probable runaway at the time of her disappearance, and police took minimal action to investigate and track her down. Butler's mother had given her permission to ride her bicycle to the rodeo at the Washoe County Fair on the day she vanished, a day when the Gallegos were at the fair. The couple were never interviewed then by police who were investigating Butler's disappearance. Her remains have never been located, and there is suspicion of foul play.
- On April 24, 1979, before abducting Judd and Colley, Charlene had unsuccessfully attempted to lure a young girl to her van. Charlene offered the girl money if she helped distribute flyers and she eagerly accepted, but said she had to get permission from her uncle, who was working as a security guard at the fairground. The girl left, and later came back saying she had gotten permission. Fearing that the uncle might later give crucial details to police, Charlene told the girl that someone else had accepted the job, and the girl walked off.
- In 2013, a woman only identifying herself as Cindy told CBS Sacramento that she narrowly avoided being abducted by the Gallegos in Nevada in 1979. She recalled that Charlene approached her in a Carson City parking lot asking for directions as Gerald stared intently from their van. After several seconds, Gerald told Charlene "Not her" and she reentered the van and drove off.
- On April 1, 1980, Gerald stalked a 13-year-old girl to her parents' home on Waterford Road in Sacramento. John Osborn, the girl's father, was alerted and confronted Gerald demanding an explanation. Gerald persuaded him that he was intoxicated and had unknowingly wandered away from his workplace, and deciding not to phone the police, Osborn took control of Gerald's van and drove him to the Bob-Les club, but before doing so he patted him down and collected his firearm. This incident is the only known instance of Gerald stalking a potential victim without Charlene's assistance.
- Both Charlene and law enforcement speculated a link between Gerald, who resided in Sacramento for much of his adult life, and a serial rapist who perpetrated around fifty sexual assaults in the area during the mid-to-late 1970s. That criminal was known as the East Area Rapist, and his crimes ceased around the same time Gerald and Charlene were apprehended. In the 2000s, Gerald's DNA was entered into a national DNA database in an effort to establish potential forensic links to unsolved crimes. Ultimately, Gerald's DNA did not match that of the East Area Rapist. (Note: The East Area Rapist was eventually identified as Joseph James DeAngelo.)

== Questions about culpability ==
Charlene has always maintained that she never directly assaulted nor killed any of the victims. Her claims were disputed by Gerald, his legal team, and several investigators, all of whom asserted that Charlene had at a minimum participated in the sexual abuse and murder of several victims. During the California trial, Gerald told the jury that Charlene was a lesbian and claimed to have caught her in January 1980 having sex with another woman in their Sacramento apartment. Fellow female inmates at Rio Cosumnes Correctional Center alleged that Charlene, despite presenting herself in court as weepy and fearful, was "a ruling force in the dorm" who boasted of her role in the murders and had once made death threats against an inmate named Nancy Romero for refusing sexual advances made by her and another inmate Charlene had a built a sexual relationship with. Charlene denied making any death threats but admitted that she "had what might be deemed a homosexual affair with another jail inmate".

In 1987, attorney Lew Carnahan from Gerald's legal team interviewed Chris Hatcher, a clinical psychologist from the University of California, San Francisco, who told him that submissive partners of a killing team sometimes proceed to commit similar crimes to gain independence. Carnahan learned from the transcript of the Nevada trial that Charlene had a delivery route during her employment at a meat firm that took her near the site where Redican and Chipman-Twiggs were killed. He learned of further evidence that had not been presented at trial, including Charlene's affairs with other women, that the macramé rope used to bind the victims had actually been purchased by her, and a paycheck dated from Gerald's employment as a bartender that may provide him with an alibi. Carnahan presented this information in an attempt to grant Gerald a new trial, citing it as "at least a significant possibility Charlene Williams was in fact the dominant and possibly sole perpetrator of these crimes", but the Nevada Supreme Court rejected his motion.

Richard Wagner, the Lovelock District Attorney who had assisted in the plea bargain for Charlene, dismissed the claim that she had directly murdered any of the victims, calling it a "damnable lie" and offered no regret about the plea bargain, but also said that in a "perfect world" Charlene "should have the death sentence". According to former homicide detective Ray Biondi, Charlene had once attempted to dupe him by claiming that Gerald abducted Miller and Sowers by himself and whatever happened to them was solely on him. Biondi said he believed Charlene to be "cunning and manipulative" but also offered no regret about having her enter a plea bargain.

== Aftermath ==
In 1989, Gerald's half-brother, David Raymond Hunt, was charged with the 1980 murders of John Riggins and Sabrina Gonsalves in Davis, California, a crime investigators long suspected a copycat had committed to deflect suspicion from Gerald and Charlene. Hunt's wife Suellen and two acquaintances were also charged. While awaiting trial, Suellen filed a $1.5 million lawsuit alleging libel in the 1990 book A Venom in the Blood, which she claimed falsely accused her of murdering Gerald and Hunt's mother, whose 1986 death had been officially ruled a suicide. All four defendants were eventually cleared of murdering Riggins and Gonsalves by DNA evidence. (Note: Decades later, a man named Richard Hirschfield was convicted of murdering Riggins and Gonsalves and sentenced to death.)

Gerald and Charlene were cited as the source of inspiration for serial rapists James Daveggio and Michelle Michaud, who kidnapped and sexually assaulted seven women, killing one, in Northern California in the mid-1990s. They had even purchased the couple's trading cards in a serial killer-themed deck as well as the book The Sex Slave Murders, which detailed their crimes.

Gerald Gallego died at Renown Regional Medical Center on July 18, 2002, from advanced colorectal cancer. He had been seriously ill for approximately four months but refused to accept any treatments aimed at prolonging his life, instead opting to be sedated with painkillers. He was 56. His death was among a series of inmate deaths mentioned by assistant federal public defender Michael Pescetta during an investigation into Ely State Prison management, which had been accused of not providing adequate medical care to inmates suffering from poor health, though prison officials maintained that Gerald was an exception because he had been offered treatment but refused.

In 2013, Charlene was discovered living in the Sacramento area. During a televised interview, she again distanced herself from Gerald and bragged that she was responsible for his death sentence. She expressed sympathy for the victims and claimed she "tried to save some of their lives."

== Media ==
=== Bibliography ===
- Berry-Dee, Christopher (2010). Shared Madness: True Stories Of Couples Who Kill. London: John Blake. ISBN 978-1844548422.
- Biondi, Ray; Hecox, Walter (1988). All His Father's Sins: Inside The Gerald Gallego Sex-Slave Murders. Rocklin, CA: Prima Pub. & Communications. ISBN 978-0914629344.
- Davis, Carol Anne (2001). Women Who Kill: Profiles of Female Serial Killers. London: Allison & Busby. ISBN 978-0749005351.
- Flowers, R. Barri (1996). The Sex Slave Murders. New York: St. Martins Press. ISBN 978-1461191001.
- Van Hoffmann, Eric (1990). A Venom in the Blood. New York: Pinnacle Books. ISBN 978-0786006601.

=== Television ===
- Charlene Gallego was interviewed in an episode of the NBC talk show Leeza in 1998.
- A History Channel documentary series, Infamous Murders, analyzed the case in an episode in 2001.
- The television program Crime Stories aired an episode about the Gallegos in 2008.
- The Investigation Discovery series Wicked Attraction aired an episode about the case in 2008.
- The documentary series Born to Kill? featured an episode focusing upon the case in 2014.
- The Oxygen Network series Snapped: Killer Couples examined the case in an episode in 2015.
- The 2018 television series 35 Serial Killers the World Wants to Forget analyzed the case along with the Grim Sleeper in their eighth episode.

== See also ==
- List of serial killers in the United States
- List of serial killers by number of victims
