= Pfohl =

Pfohl is a German surname. Notable people with the surname include:

- Cornelia Pfohl (born 1971), German archer
- Ferdinand Pfohl (1862–1949), German music critic, writer and classical composer
- Lawrence Pfohl (born 1958), American professional wrestler known by the ring name Lex Luger
