= Slonim (disambiguation) =

Slonim refers to a city in Belarus. It may also refer to:

- Slonim District, of which Slonim is the administrative center
- Slonim governorate, a former guberniya of the Russian Empire
- Slonim Hasidic dynasty
- Slonim Synagogue
- Slonim or Slonimsky, a Jewish surname based on the name of the city
