= UNSOM =

UNSOM may refer to:

- the United Nations Assistance Mission in Somalia
- the University of Nevada, Reno School of Medicine, in the United States
