= Anthony Slonim =

- Born: 1964 (age 61–62)
- Occupations: Physician, former healthcare executive, author, professor
- Known for: President, CEO of Renown Health

Anthony "Tony" Slonim (born c. 1964) is an American author, physician and healthcare executive who was the president and CEO of Renown Health until 2022. Before his 2014 appointment at Renown Health, he was executive vice president and chief medical officer for RWJBarnabas Health. He also held faculty appointments at the Jefferson College of Nursing and Health and the University of Medicine and Dentistry of New Jersey. Slonim is the first quadruple-board-certified doctor in the United States with certifications in adult critical care, internal medicine, pediatric critical care and pediatrics.

== Early life and education ==
Slonim was raised in New Jersey. He attended New York University where he earned bachelor's degrees in economics and psychology. He also holds a medical degree from New York Medical College as well as a master's degree and Doctorate in Administrative Medicine and Health Policy from George Washington University School of Medicine & Health Sciences.

== Career ==
Slonim completed a residency at St. Joseph's Medical Center before completing fellowship training at the National Institutes of Health. After completing his fellowship he held a faculty position at Children's National Medical Center. In 2007 he became the vice president of Medical Affairs at the Carilion Roanoke Memorial Hospital. Slonim served as the CMO of the Shady Grove Adventist Hospital in Rockville, Maryland before joining the New Jersey–based Barnabas Health as chief medical officer and executive vice president. At Barnabas, he was responsible for overseeing patient care delivery, accountable care initiatives, and information technology.

In May 2014 he was named the CEO and president of Renown Health, where he expanded the organization's affiliations with the University of Nevada, Reno School of Medicine, Stanford University School of Medicine, Stanford Children's Health, and Stanford Health Care, as well as helping to raise funds to launch a pediatric residency program at Renown and raising additional funds for the Child Health Institute.

In 2017 he was appointed editor-in-chief of the American Association for Physician Leadership's bi-monthly Physician Leadership Journal. The same year he was listed in Modern Healthcare's 50 Most Influential Physicians Executives and Leaders list. Slonim also co-chairs the Truckee Meadows Healthy Communities Board, serves as a chairman on the American Journal of Managed Care's ACO Coalition, and has been appointed to the American Hospital Association's Health Care Systems Council.

In 2019, he was appointed to serve on the Patient Protection Commission created by the Office of Nevada Governor Steve Sisolak.

Slonim was fired for cause from Renown in March, 2022 after the Renown board hired outside counsel to investigate his actions as CEO.

== Personal life ==
At the age of 38 Slonim was diagnosed with oral cancer, something that he has said offered him a critical perspective about healthcare. He lives in Florida with his wife, Shiela. He has two children.

== Bibliography ==
- Slonim, Anthony D.; Michael J. Bell; Murray M. Pollack (2006). Pediatric Critical Care Medicine. USA: Lippincott Williams & Wilkins. ISBN 0781794692.
- Slonim, Anthony D.; Lisa Marcucci; Elizabeth A. Martinez; Elliott R. Haut; Jose I. Suarez (2006). Avoiding Common ICU Errors. USA: Lippincott Williams & Wilkins. ISBN 0781767393.
- Slonim, Anthony D.; Lisa Marcucci (2008). Avoiding Common Pediatric Errors. USA: Lippincott Williams & Wilkins. ISBN 978-0781774895.
- Slonim, Anthony D.; Jeannie Scruggs Garber; Lisa Marcucci; Monty Gross; Betsy Hargreaves Allbee (2009). Avoiding Common Nursing Errors. USA: Lippincott Williams & Wilkins. ISBN 978-1605470870.
- Slonim, Anthony D.; Paul Dallas; Alexander Levitov (2010). Bedside Ultrasonography in Clinical Medicine. USA: McGraw-Hill Education. ISBN 978-0071663311.
- Slonim, Anthony D.; Alexander B. Levitov; Paul Marik (2013). Point of Care Medicine. USA: McGraw-Hill Education. ISBN 978-0071813358.
- Slonim, Anthony D.; Donald Lombardi (2013). Manual of Healthcare Leadership: Essential Strategies for Physician and Administrative Leaders. USA: McGraw-Hill Education. ISBN 978-0071794848.
