= Ferdinand Pfohl =

German music critic, music writer and composer

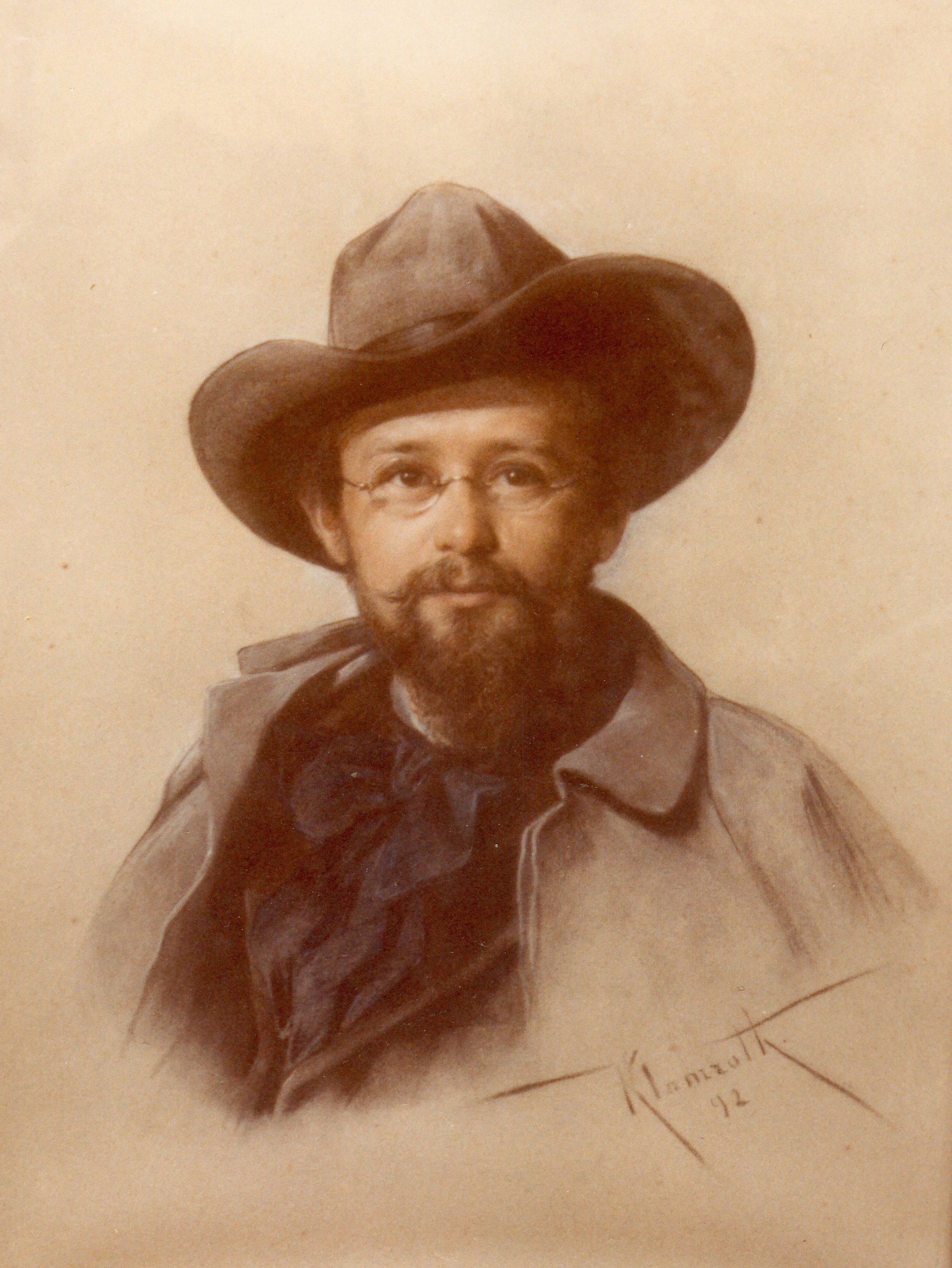
Ferdinand Pfohl, Pastell by Anton Klamroth, 1892

Ferdinand Pfohl (German: [pfoːl]; 12 October 1862 in Elbogen, Bohemia, Austrian Empire, now Loket n.O., Czech Republic – 16 December 1949 in Hamburg-Bergedorf) was a German music critic, music writer and composer.

Pfohl studied law at Prague, then in Leipzig he studied music as private pupil of Oscar Paul and attended courses in philosophy at the university, worked as music critic at Leipziger Tageblatt and Königlich-Leipziger Zeitung; from November 1892 to 1931 he was music editor of Hamburger Nachrichten, since 1913 to 1934 teacher and co-director of Vogt Conservatory in Hamburg (Thompson - Slonimsky - Sabin, p. 1619). Prof. h.c., Dr. phil. h.c., author of many books on music, e.g. a biography on famous Hungarian conductor Arthur Nikisch and on Richard Wagner.

Pfohl was amongst the most highly regarded music critics in Germany; his opinions carried a great deal of weight. Amongst music circles he was particularly well known as a writer and composer (Willscher in Musik in Geschichte und Gegenwart, 2005).

His compositions include a lot of lieder, some piano pieces and works for orchestra.

The Pfohl-Woyrsch-Society, Pfohl-Woyrsch-Gesellschaft e.V. Hamburg is going to revive his music and to inform about his musical and literary works.
