= Fiber analysis =

Method of identifying and examining fibers used by law enforcement agencies

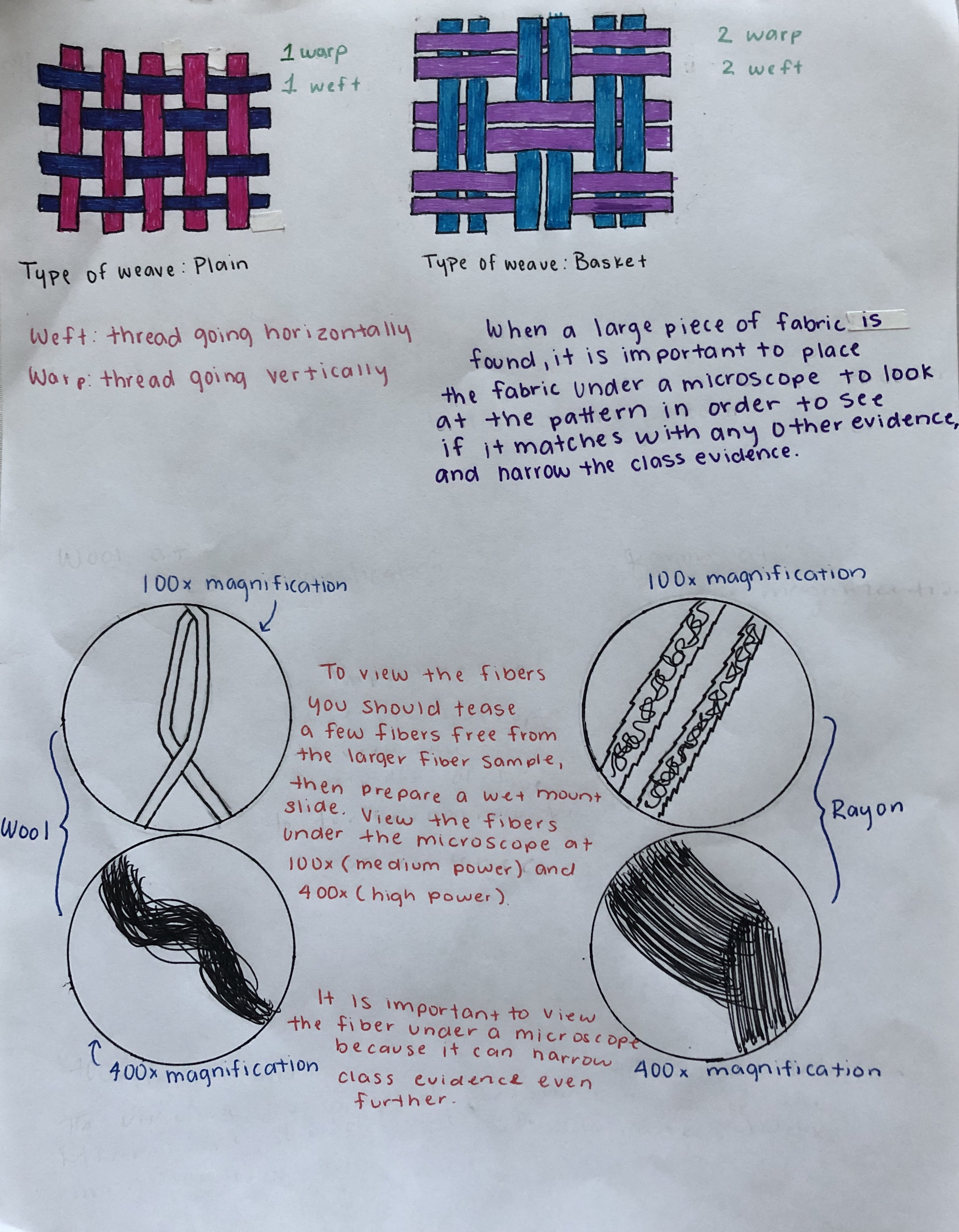
How fiber analysis works with large and small samples

Fiber analysis is a method of identifying and examining fibers used by law enforcement agencies around the world to procure evidence during an investigation. Fiber analysis is also used by law enforcement agencies to place suspects at the scene of the crime. Transfer of fiber can occur during close contact with the victim or suspect. Fiber transfers can also occur during break-ins where fibers from the intruder are caught in. Fiber evidence is a type of trace evidence, this means it will likely be very small and sometimes could be microscopic. This method is usually not used to actually pinpoint an offender in an investigation as it is not as reliable as DNA.

Fiber analysis does not follow any officially laid-down procedure. The most common use of fiber analysis is microscopic examination of both longitudinal and cross sectional samples. While this is the most common method of undertaking fiber analysis, others do exist. These include the burning and solubility methods. These methods are most commonly used to reveal the identity of the fiber. Fiber analysis is usually not undertaken in university labs because of the usual lack of required solvents.

== Methods ==
=== Scanning electron microscopy ===
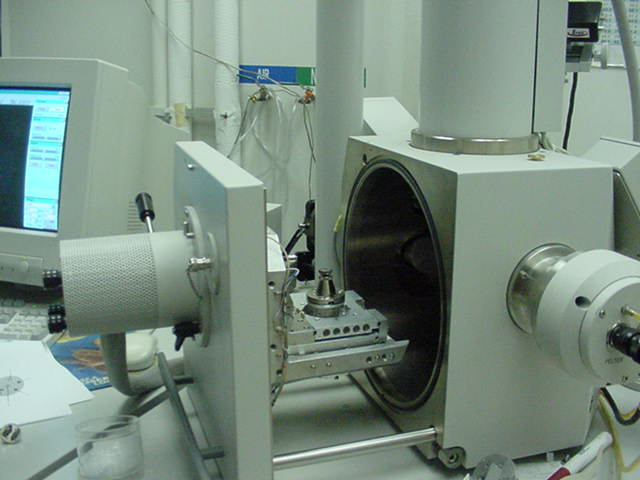
SEM opened sample chamber

Scanning electron microscopy (SEM) is method of photography which requires an instrument called the scanning electron microscope, which uses electrons rather than light to form an image. There are many advantages to using the SEM instead of a light microscope. Using SEM requires a large depth of field, which allows a large amount of the sample to be in focus at one time.

=== Atomic force microscopy ===
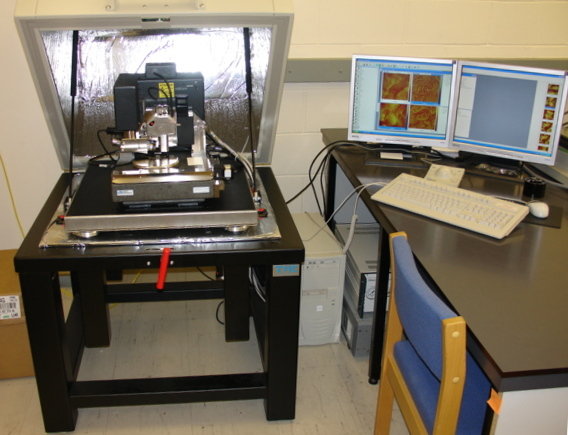
A commercial AFM setup

Atomic force microscopy is a method which is carried out using an atomic force microscope, which is an instrument that can analyze and characterize samples at the microscopic level. The instrument allows the analyst to look at surface characteristics with very accurate resolution ranging from 100 μm to less than 1 μm.

=== Comparison Microscopy ===
Comparison microscopes are often used by analysts to look at the general characteristics of the fibers. This technique is generally only useful when comparing a known sample from a scene to a possible source. The analysts will look at a cross section of the fibers under a comparison microscope and look at characteristics such as frays, cuts, striations, crimps, colour, thickness, and general shapes within the fiber. The comparison microscope allows for two samples to be observed simultaneously.

== Dyes ==
There are many types of dyes and colours that are used on fibers. To help analysts narrow down their sample the American Association of Textile Chemists generates a colour index that contains all dyes and colours that are used on fibers. This allows analysts to compare their sample to known data in order to determine possible sources.

It is also important for analysts to know the types of dyes that can be used on fibers. The most common list of dyes that are used can be seen below. These classes of dye are determined through how they are applied to fibers.

- Acid Dyes: used in basic conditions, functional group of fiber is protonated and bonds to functional group of dye.
- Basic Dyes: used in acidic conditions, functional group of fiber is deprotonated and bonds to functional group of dye.
- Azoic Dyes: use diazo salt and a coupling agent to dye fibers.
- Direct Dyes: dye is applied using heat and electrolytes.
- Disperse Dyes: Van der Waal forces and hydrogen bonding dye the fibers.
- Metallized Dyes: metal complexes forms between the dye and fiber.
- Sulfur Dyes: dye is reduced and then oxidizes with the fiber to bond, the dye becomes insoluble.
- Vat Dyes: similar process to sulfur dyes, dye becomes insoluble with fiber once oxidation occurs.
