= Slonimsky =

Slonimsky is an Ashkenazi Jewish surname popular among people of Belarusian, Polish and Russian people of Jewish origin. Originated from Polish Słonimski (feminine: Słonimska, plural: Słonimscy), derived from the adjectival form for the city of Słonim.

Notable persons with this surname include the following:

- Antoni Słonimski: Polish poet
- Piotr Słonimski: Polish-French geneticist
- Hayyim Selig Slonimski: Hebrew publisher, astronomer, inventor, and science author (known as Zinovy Slonimsky in Russia)
- Henry Slonimsky: Belarusian-American professor
- Janina Konarska-Słonimska: Polish artist
- Ludvig Slonimsky: Russian economist, journalist and editor, son of Hayyim Selig (Zinovy) Slonimski
- Mikhail Slonimsky: Soviet writer; younger brother of Nicolas Slonimsky
- Nicolas Slonimsky: Russian-American musicologist and music critic
- Sergei Slonimsky: Russian composer, son of Mikhail Slonimsky

A surname with a similar meaning is Slonim:

- Anthony Slonim: American author, physician and healthcare executive
- Mark Slonim: Russian politician, literary critic, scholar and translator
- Reuben Slonim: Canadian rabbi and journalist
- Vered Slonim-Nevo: professor of social work at the Spitzer Department of Social Work in Ben-Gurion University of the Negev
- Menucha Rochel Slonim: rebbetzin
- Véra Nabokov (née Slonim): wife, editor, and translator of Russian writer Vladimir Nabokov

== See also ==
- Slonim (Hasidic dynasty)
- Slonimsky's Earbox
