= Warm Springs Correctional Center =

Prison in Carson City, Nevada

- Interactive map of Warm Springs Correctional Center
- Location: 3301 E. 5th Street, Carson City, Nevada, 89701 U.S.; 39°09′25″N 119°44′15″W
- Status: closed
- Capacity: 532
- Opened: 1961
- Warden: Nethanjah Breitenbach

Warm Springs Correctional Center (WSCC) is a Nevada Department of Corrections prison in Carson City, Nevada, United States.

== History ==
Warm Springs is in Carson City and is the smallest of the seven major institutions of the Nevada Department of Corrections. Its name comes from the historical hotel built at the site by Abraham Curry, who was later the first warden of the Nevada State Prison. It was constructed in 1961 and was known as the Nevada Women’s Correctional Center until September 1997, when it was converted to a medium security men’s prison in 1998, then to a minimum custody facility in July 2003, before being converted back to a men's medium custody institution in July 2008. WSCC is immediately to the south of the former NSP. On November 21, 2022, it was announced that Warm Springs would be closing. It officially shuttered by the end of December 2022, and is currently closed with potential to reopen.

== Institution ==
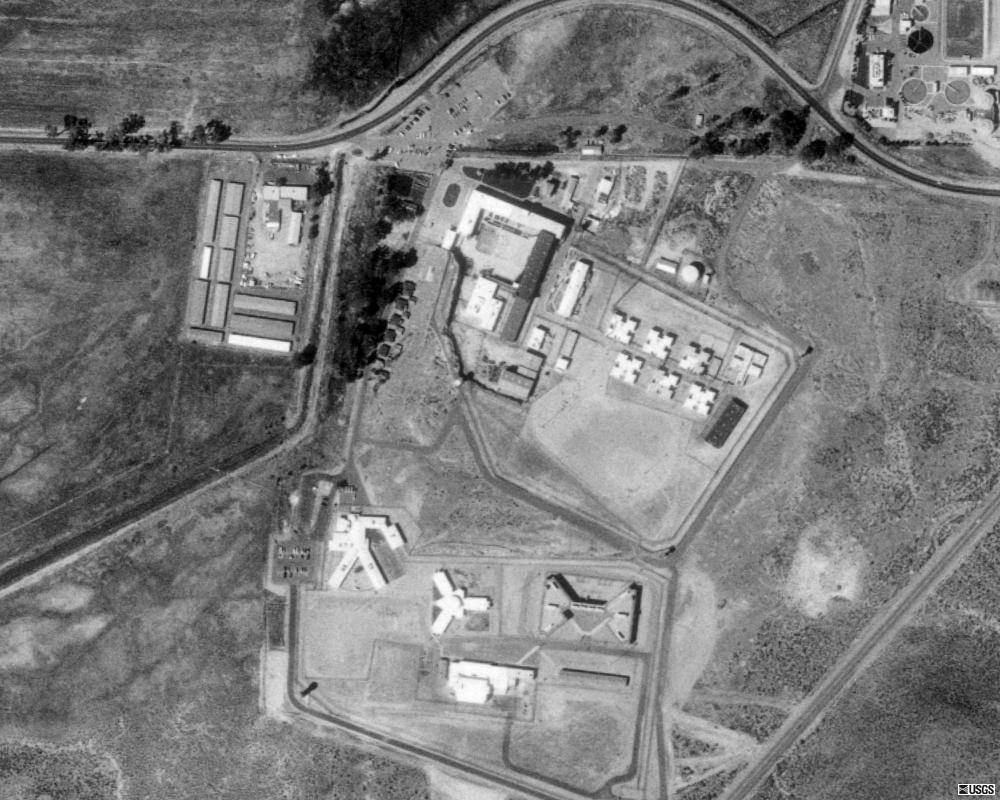
Warm Springs Correctional Center visible below Nevada State Prison in 1999.

The institution has been remodeled and expanded four times. It has four operating housing units divided into wings, two towers, and a core services building that houses the kitchens and cafeteria, infirmary, education facilities, law library, and gym. Carson City School District and Western Nevada College provide education to inmates.
