= Renown Regional Medical Center =

- Renown Health
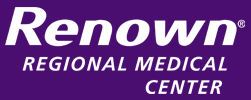

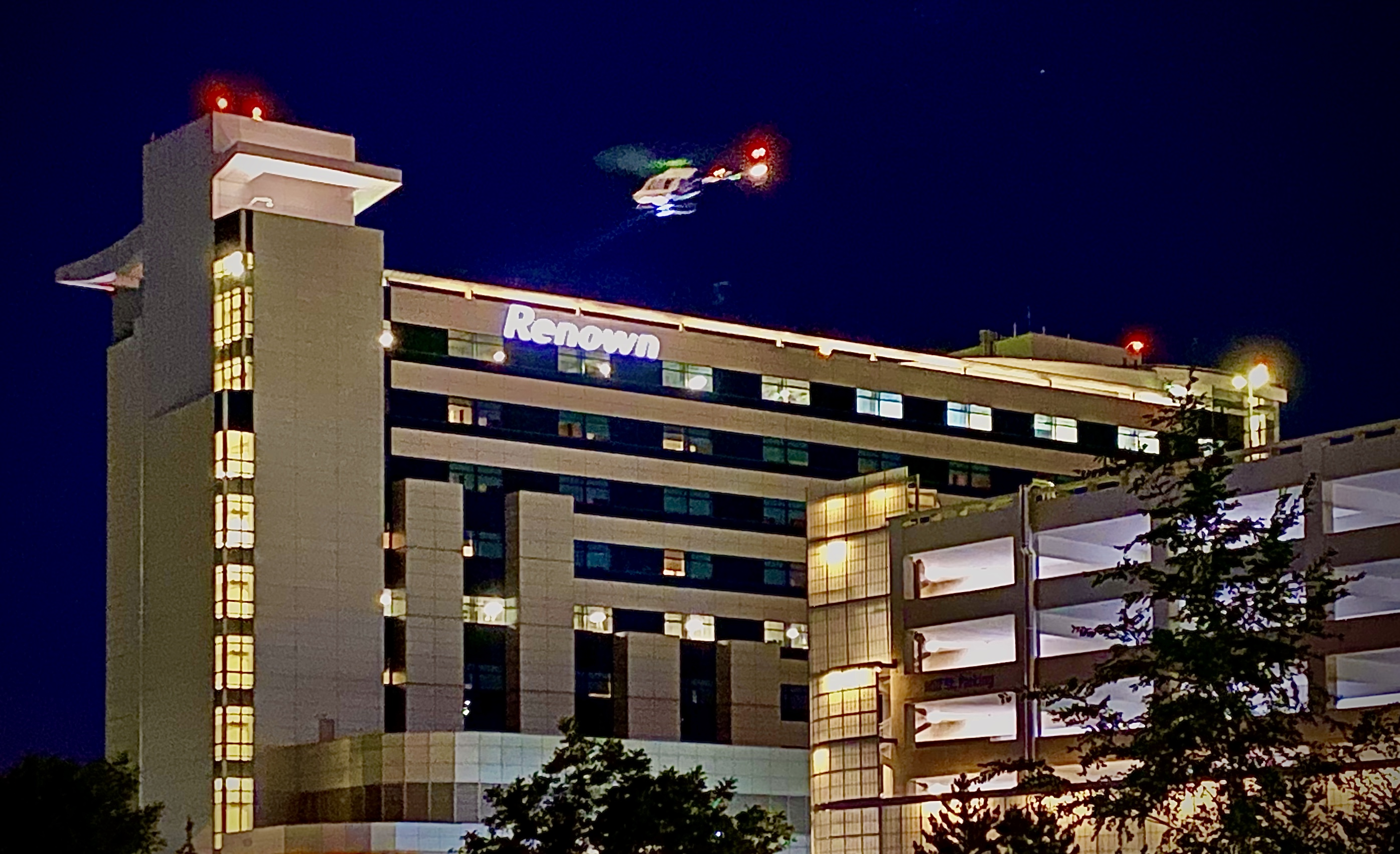

Geography
- Location: 1155 Mill Street; Reno, Washoe County, Nevada, United States
- Coordinates: 39.52542°N 119.79574°W

Organization
- Care system: Private
- Type: General and Teaching
- Affiliated university: University of Nevada, Reno School of Medicine (1969–present)

Services
- Standards: Joint Commission
- Emergency department: Level II Adult Trauma Center / Level II Pediatric Trauma Center
- Beds: 650

Helipads
- Helipad: FAA LID: NV57

History
- Founded: 1876; 150 years ago

Links
- Website: renown.org/find/renown-regional-medical-center
- Lists: Hospitals in Nevada

Renown Regional Medical Center (formerly Washoe Medical Center) is part of Renown Health (formerly Washoe Health System), a non-profit hospital in Reno, Nevada. It is Renown Health's flagship hospital and the region's only Level II trauma center. Renown Regional facilitates the area's only dedicated children's hospital, Renown Children's Hospital. The hospital was founded in 1876.

== History ==
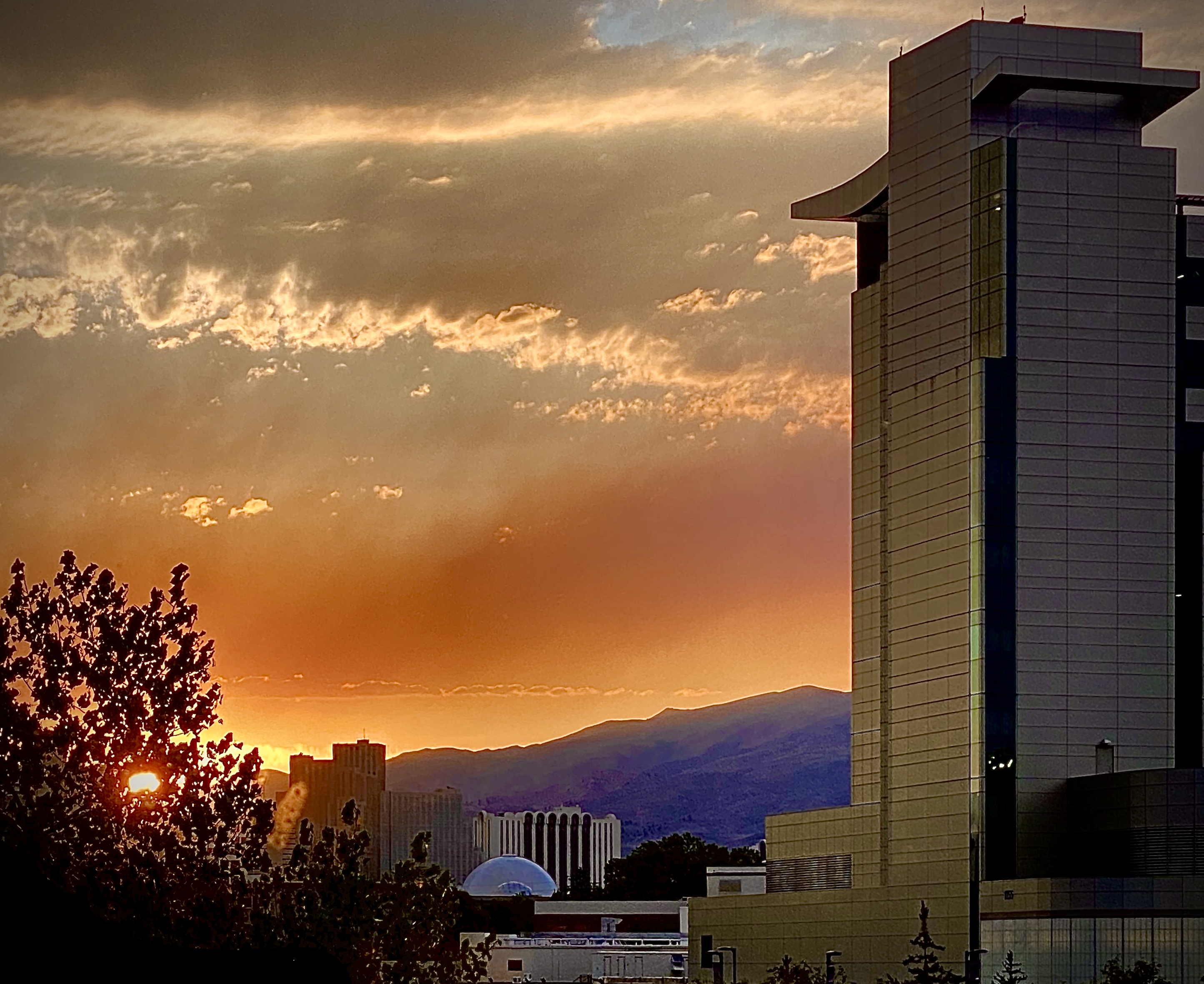
Sunset with the tower of Renown Regional Medical Center

In 1862, the organization's roots was established with the formation of the Washoe Clinic. The clinic was founded to treat patients affected by a smallpox outbreak in Washoe Valley, Nevada. The Washoe County Hospital opened in 1864, after Nevada became a state. The medical center and the healthcare organization were transferred to Washoe Health Systems, a private non-profit organization, in 1984. In 2006, Washoe Health System changed its name to Renown Health.

The Renown Regional Medical Center opened a new pediatric intensive care unit and pediatric floor in February 2012. Renown raised $5.2 million for the 10 month construction project. The remodeling of the floor was Renown's largest philanthropic project.

== Facilities ==
The Renown Regional Medical Center consists of two Centers for Advanced Medicine. The hospital facilitates the Renown Children's Hospital, the area's only dedicated children's hospital. Renown Regional provides cancer, heart, neurosciences, orthopedics, surgery, intensive care and women's and children's services.

Renown Regional is the region's only Level II Trauma Center.

Renown Regional provides three helipads for aerial transport.
