= Renown Health =

American not-for-profit healthcare network in Nevada

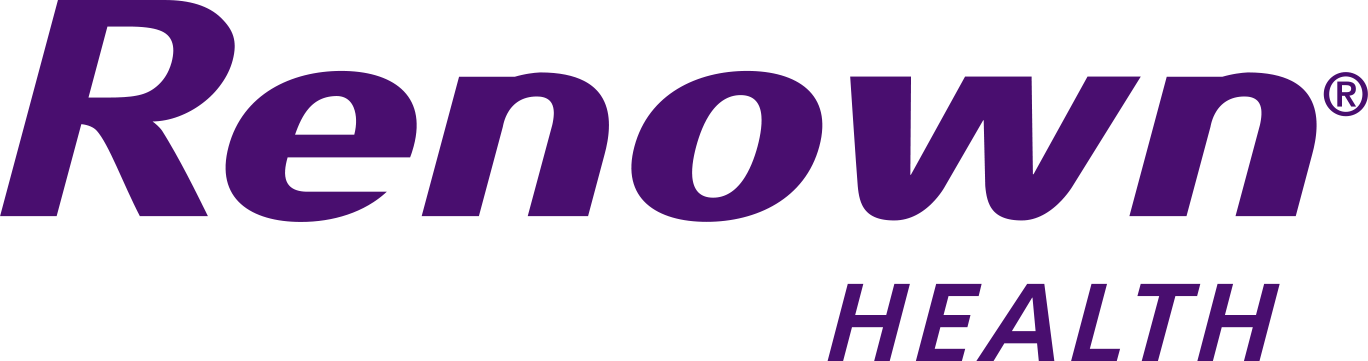
- Formerly: Washoe Health System (1862–2006)
- Type: Nonprofit organization
- Industry: Health care
- Founded: 1862; 164 years ago Washoe Valley, Nevada, U.S.
- Headquarters: Reno, Nevada, U.S.
- Area served: Northern Nevada
- Key people: Brian Erling (president and CEO)
- Number of employees: 7,600
- Website: renown.org

Renown Health (formerly Washoe Health System) is an American hospital network and the largest locally owned not-for-profit healthcare network in Northern Nevada. It has more than 7500 employees system-wide and is one of Northern Nevada's largest employers. It is headquartered in Reno, Nevada.

On February 3, 2026, Renown Health began a joint venture with Kaiser Permanente.

== History ==
Renown Health, formerly known as the Washoe Health System, was founded in 1862 during a smallpox outbreak. The clinic became the area's first hospital when Nevada became a state in 1864. In 1875, 40 acres were purchased and the hospital opened the following year with 40 beds. The region's first pediatrics unit opened at Washoe Medical Center in 1949. A heart care unit was established by the organization in 1963. The organization established the first cancer treatment center in Northern Nevada in the 1970s. In 1979, the University of Nevada School of Medicine established a residency program at the hospital. The university later partnered with the hospital for brain fMRI research.

In 1984, Washoe Health System transitioned to a private not-for-profit health network and became the region's only level II trauma center between Sacramento, California, and Salt Lake City, Utah, and Renown Pregnancy Center (formerly Washoe Pregnancy Center) was established. Renown launched its not-for-profit insurance division, Hometown Health in 1988. In 1993, the hospital established its Healing Art Program which has grown to include music at the bedside, art at the bedside, pet therapy, healing arts performances and healing gardens. In 1999, the organization partnered with Barton Memorial Hospital to increase the number of health care programs in Carson Valley.

In 2003, the organization expanded its services when it acquired a rehabilitation hospital. The region's first angiography biplane, used to treat patients who had a stroke, was introduced by the organization in 2004. That year, the first PET/CT was used for diagnosing and treating cancer in patients. In 2006, Washoe Health System changed its name to Renown Health. In 2007, Renown Health completed the Tahoe Tower at the Renown Regional Medical Center campus, a 10-story patient care tower featuring state-of-the art technology. Renown Health became the first hospital in Northern Nevada to perform robotic surgery using da Vinci Surgical System S HD in 2008. The area's first and only children's emergency room was opened in 2009, at the Renown Regional Medical Center. The emergency room was designed for patients under the age of 18 and included 11 children's exam rooms. The organization is the region's only Children's Miracle Network hospital.

In July 2014, Renown was the first on the west coast and fourth in the world to perform a surgery with the da Vinci Xi robotic surgical assistant. That year, Renown Health partnered with the University of Nevada, Reno School of Medicine to expand the medical school and increase the number of physicians who train and practice in Northern Nevada. In June 2016, Renown Health partnered with several Stanford University health facilities including Stanford Health Care, Stanford Children's Health and Stanford Medicine. The agreement was said to help reduce the need for patients to travel when seeking high-level care and allowed Stanford staff to be based in Northern Nevada. In August 2016, the organization received a $7.5 million donation from the William N. Pennington Foundation which helped it expand its pediatric care and form a pediatric medical residency partnership with University of Nevada, Reno School of Medicine. Renown Health announced it would open a family practice clinic in South Reno in March 2017, bringing its total number of primary care clinics to 12. In April 2017, Renown Children's Hospital was the first hospital in Nevada to be certified by the National Safe Sleep Hospital Certification Program.

On September 10, 2025, Kaiser Permanente and Renown Health signed a definitive agreement to create the joint venture Kaiser Permanente Nevada; by having Kaiser Permanente purchase a majority interest in Renown Health's insurance subsidiary Hometown Health. On February 3, 2026, the joint venture was finalized.

== Leadership ==
In 2006, Jim Miller was leading the health care system when it changed its name from Washoe, a named dating to the 1870s as Washoe County Hospital, to Renown Health. The new name was part of a broader two-year, $275 million expansion.

In 2013, Miller stepped down from Renown in the wake of a business dispute and court settlement with cardiologists whose group had been acquired by Renown.

Anthony D. Slonim became president and CEO of Renown Health in May 2014.

In March 2022, Renown hospital system will have a new CEO effective immediately following a presentation of results from a personnel misconduct investigation. In a public statement released Thursday, the Renown Health Board of Trustees announced Anthony D. Slonim was terminated with cause as CEO of Renown Health. The outgoing executive will be replaced by Thomas R. Graf, M.D., FAAFP. In addition to Graf taking the CEO position, COO Sy Johnson will be serving as president, according to Renown.

In October 2022, Renown Health has selected Brian Erling, MD, MBA, as the health system's next CEO and president, effective November 14, 2022.

== The Healthy Nevada Project ==
In September, 2016, Renown Health partnered with 23andMe and Desert Research Institute to provide 10,000 Northern Nevada residents with free genetic testing through the Healthy Nevada Project (HNP). The goal of the HNP is to study the complex relationship between a person's health, genetics, and environment. Public interest in the project resulted in rapid enrollment and an unexpectedly quick finish to the first phase of the study. This motivated an expansion of the project to encompass a total of 50,000 Nevadans.

In starting its second phase, the HNP partnered with personal genomics company Helix in order to gather exome sequencing data—greatly increasing the amount of genetic data collected. In exchange for participating in the HNP, Helix provided participants with a free genetic ancestry analysis as well as other educational insights. Phase II of the HNP launched on March 15, 2018. In October of that same year, HNP became one of the first population health studies in the country to return clinical results to study volunteers. Participants who opted-in to receiving clinical results were screened for genetic variants that significantly increase their risk of developing Familial Hypercholesterolemia, Hereditary Breast and Ovarian Cancer syndrome, and Lynch Syndrome. In the first six months of phase II, approximately ~23,700 Nevadans were sequenced, 290 of which were found to have medically actionable results. The HNP has announced a plan to expand the project to a total of 250,000 Nevadans with expectations that approximately 1.3% will have results that are immediately impactful for their medical care.

== Facilities ==
- Carson Valley Medical Center
- Renown Regional Medical Center
- Renown South Meadows Medical Center
- Renown Children's Hospital
- Renown Rehabilitation Hospital
- Renown Occupational Health
- Renown Medical Group
- Renown Skilled Nursing
- Renown Urgent Care
- Renown X-Ray & Imaging
- Renown Lab Services
