= University of Nevada, Reno School of Medicine =

Public medical school in Reno, Nevada, US

Coordinates: 39.54887°N 119.81396°W

- Former name: University of Nevada School of Medicine (1969–2016)
- Type: Public
- Established: March 25, 1969; 57 years ago
- Parent institution: University of Nevada, Reno
- Dean: Paul J. Hauptman, MD
- Students: 70 per year
- Location: Reno, Nevada, U.S.
- Website: med.unr.edu

The University of Nevada, Reno School of Medicine is an academic division of the University of Nevada, Reno and grants the Doctor of Medicine (MD) degree. The School of Medicine was founded on March 25, 1969, as the first medical school in the state of Nevada. More than 2,600 MDs have graduated from the School of Medicine. The pre-clinical campus is located in Reno, but the third and fourth years can be spent in hospitals and clinics throughout Nevada. Residencies associated with the School of Medicine are located in Reno. Students may earn the MD-MPH, MD-MBA or MD–PhD degrees as well.

== Affiliated hospitals ==
The School of Medicine has affiliations with the following hospitals:

- Carson Tahoe Regional Medical Center (Carson City)
- Carson Valley Medical Center (Gardnerville)
- Humboldt General Hospital (Winnemucca)
- Mount Grant General Hospital (Hawthorne)
- Northern Nevada Medical Center (Sparks)
- Pershing General Hospital (Lovelock)
- Renown Health (Reno)
- Saint Mary's Regional Medical Center (Reno)
- South Lyon Medical Center (Yerington)
- VA Sierra Nevada Health (Reno)
- William Bee Ririe Critical Access Hospital (Ely)

== Graduate medical education ==
The residencies and fellowships associated with the University of Nevada, Reno School of Medicine, as of July 1, 2023.

=== Residencies ===
Program	Length	Accreditation
Family Medicine	3 years	ACGME
Internal Medicine	3 years	ACGME
Pediatrics	3 years	ACGME
Psychiatry	4 years	ACGME

=== Fellowships ===
Program	Department	Length	Accreditation
Primary Care Sports Medicine	Family Medicine	1 year	ACGME
Geriatric Medicine	Internal Medicine	1 year	ACGME
Hospice and Palliative Medicine	Internal Medicine	1 year	ACGME
Child and Adolescent Psychiatry	Psychiatry	2 years	ACGME

== Notable alumni ==
- Daliah Wachs (b.1971), talk show host, media personality, author

== Library ==
The Savitt Medical Library is the academic medical library for the University of Nevada, Reno School of Medicine. It is currently located on campus in the Pennington Medical Education Building. The library was founded in July 1978, after the medical school converted to a four-year, degree-granting program. It was named for Sol and Ella Savitt after their gift made support for the library and its collection possible. Previously, it was known as the Life and Health Sciences Library and was housed in the Max C. Fleischmann College of Agriculture in 1958.

== Student Outreach Clinic ==
The Student Outreach Clinic was founded by medical students in 1996, and continues to be operated in cooperation with the Family Medicine Center under the guidance of licensed physicians. The Clinic offers free health care to those without medical insurance. The clinic is made possible by faculty, community physicians and students who donate their time and talent to oversee the clinic, and services include general and acute medical care, gynecological exams, immunizations and discounted laboratory services. A rural outreach clinic also rotates between Yerington, Lovelock and Silver Springs to provide their communities with full-service medical care.
