= 2018 term opinions of the Supreme Court of the United States =

October 2018 to October 2019 opinions

The 2018 term of the Supreme Court of the United States began October 1, 2018, and concluded October 6, 2019. The table below illustrates which opinion was filed by each justice in each case and which justices joined each opinion.

== Table key ==
Delivered the court's opinion

Joined the court's opinion

Filed a concurrence

Joined a concurrence

Filed a dissent

Joined a dissent

Filed a concurrence/dissent

Joined a concurrence/dissent

Did not participate in the decision
- Decisions that do not note an argument date were decided without oral argument. Decisions that do not note a justice delivering the court's opinion are per curiam.
- Multiple concurrences and dissents within a case are numbered, with joining votes numbered accordingly. Justices frequently join multiple opinions in a single case; each vote is subdivided accordingly.
- An asterisk ( * ) in the court's opinion denotes that it was only a majority in part or a plurality. An asterisk in a joining vote denotes that the justice joined it only in part.
- A dash ( - ) denotes that the justice voted without filing or joining an opinion.

== 2018 term opinions ==
#	Case name and citation	Argued	Decided	Roberts	Thomas	Ginsburg	Breyer	Alito	Sotomayor	Kagan	Gorsuch	Kavanaugh
1	Mount Lemmon Fire District v. Guido, 586 U.S. ___	October 1, 2018	November 6, 2018									
2	Weyerhaeuser Co. v. United States Fish and Wildlife Serv., 586 U.S. ___	October 1, 2018	November 27, 2018									
3	United States v. Stitt, 586 U.S. ___	October 9, 2018	December 10, 2018									
4	Escondido v. Emmons, 586 U.S. ___		January 7, 2019									
5	Shoop v. Hill, 586 U.S. ___		January 7, 2019									
6	Culbertson v. Berryhill, 586 U.S. ___	November 7, 2018	January 8, 2019									
7	Henry Schein, Inc. v. Archer & White Sales, Inc., 586 U.S. ___	October 29, 2018	January 8, 2019									
8	Stokeling v. United States, 586 U.S. ___	October 9, 2018	January 15, 2019									
9	New Prime Inc. v. Oliveira, 586 U.S. ___	October 3, 2018	January 15, 2019									
10	Helsinn Healthcare S. A. v. Teva Pharmaceuticals USA, Inc., 586 U.S. ___	December 4, 2018	January 22, 2019									
11	Moore v. Texas, 586 U.S. ___		February 19, 2019									
12	Timbs v. Indiana, 586 U.S. ___	November 28, 2018	February 20, 2019		1						2	
13	Dawson v. Steager, 586 U.S. ___	December 3, 2018	February 20, 2019									
14	Yovino v. Rizo, 586 U.S. ___		February 25, 2019						-			
15	Nutraceutical Corp. v. Lambert, 586 U.S. ___	November 27, 2018	February 26, 2019									
16	Jam v. International Finance Corp., 586 U.S. ___	October 31, 2018	February 27, 2019									
17	Garza v. Idaho, 586 U.S. ___	October 30, 2018	February 27, 2019					*				
18	Madison v. Alabama, 586 U.S. ___	October 2, 2018	February 27, 2019									
19	Fourth Estate Public Benefit Corp. v. Wall-Street.com, 586 U.S. ___	January 8, 2019	March 4, 2019									
20	BNSF Railway Co. v. Loos, 586 U.S. ___	November 6, 2018	March 4, 2019									
21	Rimini Street Inc. v. Oracle USA Inc., 586 U.S. ___	January 14, 2019	March 4, 2019									
22	Washington State Dept. of Licensing v. Cougar Den, Inc., 586 U.S. ___	October 30, 2018	March 19, 2019	1	1 / 2		*	1				1 / 2
23	Nielsen v. Preap, 586 U.S. ___	October 10, 2018	March 19, 2019		* / 1			*			* / 1	2
24	Air & Liquid Systems Corp. v. DeVries, 586 U.S. ___	October 10, 2018	March 19, 2019									
25	Obduskey v. McCarthy & Holthus LLP, 586 U.S. ___	January 7, 2019	March 20, 2019									
26	Frank v. Gaos, 586 U.S. ___	October 31, 2018	March 20, 2019									
27	Republic of Sudan v. Harrison, 587 U.S. ___	November 7, 2018	March 26, 2019									
28	Sturgeon v. Frost, 587 U.S. ___	November 5, 2018	March 26, 2019									
29	Lorenzo v. SEC, 587 U.S. ___	December 3, 2018	March 27, 2019									
30	Biestek v. Berryhill, 587 U.S. ___	December 4, 2018	April 1, 2019			2			1		2	
31	Bucklew v. Precythe, 587 U.S. ___	November 6, 2018	April 1, 2019		1	1*	1		1* / 2	1*		2
32	Emulex Corp. v. Varjabedian, 587 U.S. ___	April 15, 2019	April 23, 2019									
33	Lamps Plus, Inc. v. Varela, 587 U.S. ___	October 29, 2018	April 24, 2019			1 / 4	1 / 2 / 4		1 / 3 / 4*	4		
34	Thacker v. TVA, 587 U.S. ___	January 14, 2019	April 29, 2019									
35	Franchise Tax Bd. of Cal. v. Hyatt, 587 U.S. ___	January 9, 2019	May 13, 2019									
36	Cochise Consultancy, Inc. v. United States ex rel. Hunt, 587 U.S. ___	March 19, 2019	May 13, 2019									
37	Apple, Inc. v. Pepper, 587 U.S. ___	November 26, 2018	May 13, 2019									
38	Merck Sharp & Dohme Corp. v. Albrecht, 587 U.S. ___	January 7, 2019	May 20, 2019	2	1			2				2
39	Herrera v. Wyoming, 587 U.S. ___	January 8, 2019	May 20, 2019									
40	Mission Product Holdings, Inc. v. Tempnology, LLC, 587 U.S. ___	February 20, 2019	May 20, 2019									
41	Nieves v. Bartlett, 587 U.S. ___	November 26, 2018	May 28, 2019		*	1					2	
42	Home Depot U. S. A., Inc. v. Jackson, 587 U.S. ___	January 15, 2019	May 28, 2019									
43	Smith v. Berryhill, 587 U.S. ___	March 18, 2019	May 28, 2019									
44	Box v. Planned Parenthood of Indiana and Kentucky, Inc., 587 U.S. ___		May 28, 2019						-			
45	Mont v. United States, 587 U.S. ___	February 26, 2019	June 3, 2019									
46	Fort Bend County v. Davis, 587 U.S. ___	April 22, 2019	June 3, 2019									
47	Taggart v. Lorenzen, 587 U.S. ___	April 24, 2019	June 3, 2019									
48	Azar v. Allina Health Services, 587 U.S. ___	January 15, 2019	June 3, 2019									
49	Parker Drilling Management Services, Ltd. v. Newton, 587 U.S. ___	April 16, 2019	June 10, 2019									
50	Return Mail, Inc. v. Postal Service, 587 U.S. ___	February 19, 2019	June 10, 2019									
51	Quarles v. United States, 587 U.S. ___	April 24, 2019	June 10, 2019									
52	Virginia House of Delegates v. Bethune-Hill, 587 U.S. ___	March 18, 2019	June 17, 2019									
53	Gamble v. United States, 587 U.S. ___	December 6, 2018	June 17, 2019			1					2	
54	Virginia Uranium, Inc. v. Warren, 587 U.S. ___	November 5, 2018	June 17, 2019								*	
55	Manhattan Community Access Corp. v. Halleck, 587 U.S. ___	February 25, 2019	June 17, 2019									
56	PDR Network, LLC v. Carlton Harris Chiropractic, Inc., 588 U.S. ___	March 25, 2019	June 20, 2019		1 / 2			2			1 / 2	2
57	American Legion v. American Humanist Assn., 588 U.S. ___	February 27, 2019	June 20, 2019		1 / 4		2	*		* / 2 / 3	4	5
58	McDonough v. Smith, 588 U.S. ___	April 17, 2019	June 20, 2019									
59	Gundy v. United States, 588 U.S. ___	October 2, 2018	June 20, 2019							*		
60	Knick v. Township of Scott, 588 U.S. ___	January 16, 2019	June 21, 2019									
61	Rehaif v. United States, 588 U.S. ___	April 23, 2019	June 21, 2019									
62	North Carolina Dept. of Revenue v. Kimberley Rice Kaestner 1992 Family Trust, 588 U.S. ___	April 16, 2019	June 21, 2019									
63	Flowers v. Mississippi, 588 U.S. ___	March 20, 2019	June 21, 2019								*	
64	Dutra Group v. Batterton, 588 U.S. ___	March 25, 2019	June 24, 2019									
65	Iancu v. Brunetti, 588 U.S. ___	April 15, 2019	June 24, 2019	1			2 / 3		3			
66	Food Marketing Institute v. Argus Leader Media, 588 U.S. ___	April 22, 2019	June 24, 2019									
67	United States v. Davis, 588 U.S. ___	April 17, 2019	June 24, 2019	*								
68	Tennessee Wine and Spirits Retailers Assn. v. Thomas, 588 U.S. ___	January 16, 2019	June 26, 2019									
69	Kisor v. Wilkie, 588 U.S. ___	March 27, 2019	June 26, 2019	* / 1	2			2* / 3		*	2	2* / 3
70	United States v. Haymond, 588 U.S. ___	February 26, 2019	June 26, 2019								*	
71	Rucho v. Common Cause, 588 U.S. ___	March 26, 2019	June 27, 2019									
72	Department of Commerce v. New York, 588 U.S. ___	April 23, 2019	June 27, 2019		* / 1	* / 2	* / 2	* / 3	* / 2	* / 2	* / 1	* / 1
73	Mitchell v. Wisconsin, 588 U.S. ___	April 23, 2019	June 27, 2019			1		*	1	1	2	
#	Case name and citation	Argued	Decided	Roberts	Thomas	Ginsburg	Breyer	Alito	Sotomayor	Kagan	Gorsuch	Kavanaugh

== 2018 term membership and statistics ==
This was the fourteenth term of Chief Justice Roberts's tenure and the first term for Justice Kavanaugh. The Court began its term with a vacant seat following the retirement of Justice Anthony Kennedy on July 31, 2018. The seat was filled by Brett Kavanaugh on October 6, 2018.

Justice		Appointment history		Agreement with judgment		Opinions filed				
Seniority	Name	President	Date confirmed	%	#					Total
Chief Justice	John Roberts	George W. Bush	September 29, 2005	84.9%	62/73	7	2	1	2	12
Associate Justice	Clarence Thomas	George H. W. Bush	October 23, 1991	74%	54/73	8	13	1	6	28
Associate Justice	Ruth Bader Ginsburg	Bill Clinton	August 10, 1993	75.3%	55/73	6	2	2	4	14
Associate Justice	Stephen Breyer	Bill Clinton	August 3, 1994	76.7%	56/73	8	2	3	7	20
Associate Justice	Samuel Alito	George W. Bush	January 31, 2006	80.8%	59/73	7	5	1	7	20
Associate Justice	Sonia Sotomayor	Barack Obama	August 6, 2009	75.3%	55/73	7	3	1	8	19
Associate Justice	Elena Kagan	Barack Obama	August 7, 2010	82.2%	60/73	8	1	0	3	12
Associate Justice	Neil Gorsuch	Donald Trump	April 7, 2017	74%	54/73	8	4	1	9	22
Associate Justice	Brett Kavanaugh	Donald Trump	October 6, 2018	89.2%	58/65	7	5	0	2	14
Notes on statistics: Opinion counts only include the bench opinions listed above; opinions relating to orders or in-chambers opinions are not included.; Agreement with the Court's judgment does not guarantee agreement with the reasoning expressed in its opinion. A justice is not considered in agreement if they dissented even in part. Agreement percentages are based only on the listed cases in which a justice participated and are rounded to the nearest one-tenth of one percentage point.						Totals				
Notes on statistics: Opinion counts only include the bench opinions listed above; opinions relating to orders or in-chambers opinions are not included.; Agreement with the Court's judgment does not guarantee agreement with the reasoning expressed in its opinion. A justice is not considered in agreement if they dissented even in part. Agreement percentages are based only on the listed cases in which a justice participated and are rounded to the nearest one-tenth of one percentage point.						66	37	10	48	161
