= Bethune-Hill v. Virginia State Board of Elections =

- Supreme Court of the United States

Argued December 5, 2016 Decided March 1, 2017
- Full case name: Bethune-Hill, et al. v. Virginia State Board of Elections, et al.
- Docket no.: 15-680
- Citations: 580 U.S. 178 (more) 137 S. Ct. 788; 197 L. Ed. 2d 85

Case history
- Prior: 141 F. Supp. 3d 505 (E.D. Va. 2015); probable jurisdiction noted, 136 S. Ct. 2406 (2016).
- Procedural: On Appeal from the United States District Court for the Eastern District of Virginia
- Subsequent: Ruling in favor of plaintiffs on remand, 326 F. Supp. 3d 128 (E.D. Va. 2018); appeal dismissed for lack of standing, Virginia House of Delegates v. Bethune-Hill, No. 18-281, 587 U.S. ___, 139 S. Ct. 1945 (2019).

Holding
- An analysis of whether a state's legislative district lines were drawn constitutionally requires consideration of the actual basis for drawing the lines, not the state's post hoc justifications.

Court membership
- Chief Justice John Roberts Associate Justices Anthony Kennedy · Clarence Thomas; Ruth Bader Ginsburg · Stephen Breyer; Samuel Alito · Sonia Sotomayor; Elena Kagan

Case opinions
- Majority: Kennedy, joined by Roberts, Ginsburg, Breyer, Sotomayor, Kagan
- Concurrence: Alito (in part)
- Concur/dissent: Thomas

Laws applied
- U.S. Const. amend. XIV

Bethune-Hill v. Virginia State Board of Elections, 580 U.S. 178 (2017), was a case in which the United States Supreme Court evaluated whether Virginia's legislature – the Virginia General Assembly – violated the Equal Protection Clause of the Fourteenth Amendment to the United States Constitution by considering racial demographics when drawing the boundaries of twelve of the state's legislative districts.

The case involves the maps drawn up by the Republican-controlled state legislative bodies to try to maintain their majority within the state. The initial decision by the United States District Court for the Eastern District of Virginia found the 2011 redistricting map to be racially gerrymandered. The state challenged to the Supreme Court, which found the District Court had misapplied a standard and remanded portions of the case while affirming other parts of the decision. On rehearing, the District Court again found the redistricting to be unconstitutional, and the state of Virginia declined to challenge the result. A second petition for the Supreme Court was initiated by the Virginia House of Delegates, appealing the new District Court ruling. The Supreme Court accepted the petition but summarily ruled that the House of Delegates did not have sufficient standing to challenge in lieu of the state itself.

== Background ==
At the time of the case, Virginia had historically been a Republican-favored state but in the last few decades, has seen a shift towards the left. Republicans had managed to hold slim margins in the state legislature despite not having won a statewide election since 2009.

After the 2010 census, Virginia redrew 12 state legislative districts to maintain a Black Voting-Age Population (BVAP) of at least 55%. It was subject to §5 of the Voting Rights Act at the time, which required the state to avoid redistricting that would lead to "retrogression" by diminishing minority voters' ability to elect their preferred candidates.

In April 2011, the Virginia General Assembly passed the redistricting plan. The plan received broad bipartisan support, including from most members of the Legislative Black Caucus. In June 2011, the U.S. Department of Justice granted preclearance under Section 5 of the Voting Rights Act, concluding the plan did not diminish minority voting strength.

This case arose when Virginia voters filed a lawsuit to challenge the twelve new legislative districts, drawn up by the controlling Republican legislative bodies in 2011, "as unconstitutional racial gerrymanders." The Supreme Court precedent Miller v. Johnson (1995) required voters to prove "that race [is] the predominant factor motivating the legislature's decision to place a significant number of voters within or without a particular district". Applying Miller, the District Court found that race was not shown to be the "predominant factor" for 11 of the 12 districts. It defined predominance as requiring an "actual conflict between traditional redistricting criteria and race".

The three-judge panel found that race did predominate for "District 75," though the panel upheld the district "because the legislature's use of race was narrowly tailored to a compelling state interest". The panel explained the state had "a strong basis in evidence" to believe that a 55% BVAP floor was required to avoid retrogression.

== Opinion of the Court ==
In an opinion written by Justice Anthony Kennedy, the Supreme Court held that the district court applied an incorrect legal standard when it determined that race did not predominate in eleven of the twelve legislative districts.

While Shaw I could plausibly be read to require a conflict with traditional districting principles, Miller and Shaw II clarified that strict scrutiny can apply to redistricting plans even when they appear to respect traditional districting principles:

The State's theory in this case is irreconcilable with Miller and Shaw II...The Equal Protection Clause does not prohibit misshapen districts. It prohibits unjustified racial classifications.

The Court also held that the district court correctly determined that legislature did not violate the constitution when drawing the boundaries of District 75. The challengers only contested the finding that the state narrowly tailored its use of race to "avoid retrogression", but did not contest that compliance with the VRA was a compelling state interest, so this was assumed but not decided. The State had "good reasons to believe" the 55% target was necessary to comply with the VRA. This satisfied the Alabama Legislative Black Caucus "strong basis in evidence" standard for narrow tailoring.

The Supreme Court remanded the case back to the district court for further proceedings.

=== Dissents ===
Clarence Thomas would have ruled against District 75 because it went further than necessary to comply with Section 5 leading to a result "fundamentally at odds with our 'color-blind' Constitution". Samuel Alito concurred in the judgment, writing separately to say that he would have held that all the majority-minority districts must satisfy strict scrutiny.

== Aftermath ==
Following the remanded hearings, in which the District Court still held that the redistricting was an unconstitutional gerrymandering, the state of Virginia issued a statement that it would not seek additional judicial relief. However, the Virginia House of Representatives instead attempted to appeal on behalf of the state, creating a new case, Virginia House of Delegates v. Bethune-Hill (Docket 18-281). This appeal was directly petitioned to the Supreme Court, which accepted the case for appeal. On June 17, 2019, the Supreme Court issued its ruling, dismissing the appeal on the basis that the House lacked standing to take over the case from the State. In the 5–4 decision, Justice Ginsburg stated that the House, acting alone from Virginia's Senate, did not have standing either directly as a party to the case, or to represent the State's interests.

Bethune-Hill may leave an opening for opponents of the VRA to press their argument that the VRA always mandates a constitutionally suspect "racial purpose". Compliance with the VRA has been assumed to be a compelling state interest but the Court did not so hold, and may revisit the issue in a later decision.

== See also ==
- List of United States Supreme Court cases
- Lists of United States Supreme Court cases by volume
- List of United States Supreme Court cases by the Roberts Court
- OneVirginia2021
