= Home Depot (disambiguation) =

The Home Depot is an American multinational home improvement retail corporation.

Home Depot or The Home Depot may also refer to:

- The Home Depot Pro (formerly Interline Brands), the business-to-business division serving contractors and tradespeople
- Home Depot U.S.A., Inc. v. Jackson, a United States Supreme Court case regarding federal court jurisdiction
