= List of United States Supreme Court cases, volume 587 =

This is a list of all the United States Supreme Court cases from volume 587 of the United States Reports:

Case name	Docket no.	Date decided
Republic of Sudan v. Harrison	587 U.S. 1	March 26, 2019
Under the Foreign Sovereign Immunities Act, civil complaints and summons must be served directly to the foreign minister's office in the minister's home country, not to their home country's embassy within the United States.
Sturgeon v. Frost II	587 U.S. 28	March 26, 2019
The ANILCA defines navigable waters in Alaska as "non-public" lands and that they are exempt from the National Park Service's national regulations.
Lorenzo v. SEC	587 U.S. 71	March 27, 2019
A defendant can be held civilly liable by the SEC for participating in a securities fraud scheme by distributing false statements, even if those statements were written by another person.
Biestek v. Berryhill	587 U.S. 97	April 1, 2019
A vocational expert's refusal to provide private market-survey data upon the applicant's request does not categorically preclude the testimony from counting as "substantial evidence."
Bucklew v. Precythe	587 U.S. 119	April 1, 2019
Baze v. Rees and Glossip v. Gross govern all Eighth Amendment challenges alleging that a method of execution inflicts unconstitutionally cruel pain. The specific as-applied challenge to the Eighth Amendment (that lethal injection would cause extreme pain due to a rare medical condition) did not meet these previous tests.
Emulex Corp. v. Varjabedian	587 U.S. 175	April 23, 2019
Dismissed as improvidently granted.
Lamps Plus, Inc. v. Varela	587 U.S. 176	April 24, 2019
Class arbitration procedures could not be compelled based on ambiguous language in the arbitration agreement.
Thacker v. TVA	587 U.S. 218	April 29, 2019
The waiver of immunity in the TVA's sue-and-be-sued clause is not subject to a discretionary function exception of the kind in the Federal Tort Claims Act.
Franchise Tax Bd. v. Hyatt	587 U.S. 230	May 13, 2019
States have sovereign immunity from private suits against them in courts of other states without their consent.
Cochise Consultancy, Inc. v. United States ex rel. Hunt	587 U.S. 262	May 13, 2019
The limitations period for qui tam lawsuits does not change when the Government intervenes in the lawsuit.
Apple Inc. v. Pepper	587 U.S. 273	May 13, 2019
Under Illinois Brick Co. v. Illinois, the iPhone owners were direct purchasers who may sue Apple for alleged monopolization.
Merck Sharp & Dohme Corp. v. Albrecht	587 U.S. 299	May 20, 2019
Whether a state-law failure-to-warn claim was pre-empted in light of "clear evidence" that the FDA would not have approved a change to a drug's label is a question of law to be decided by a judge.
Herrera v. Wyoming	587 U.S. 329	May 20, 2019
Wyoming's statehood did not void the Crow Tribe's right to hunt on "unoccupied lands of the United States" under an 1868 treaty, and that the Bighorn National Forest did not automatically become "occupied" when the forest was created.
Mission Product Holdings, Inc. v. Tempnology, LLC	587 U.S. 370	May 20, 2019
A debtor's rejection of an executory contract under Section 365 of the Bankruptcy Code has the same effect as a breach of that contract outside bankruptcy. Such an act cannot rescind rights that the contract previously granted.
Nieves v. Bartlett	587 U.S. 391	May 28, 2019
Probable cause generally defeats a retaliatory arrest claim, except for when officers under the circumstances would typically exercise their discretion not to make an arrest.
Home Depot U.S.A., Inc. v. Jackson	587 U.S. 435	May 28, 2019
Federal law does not authorize the removal of a case to federal court by a third-party counterclaim defendant, even where the counterclaim is a class action.
Smith v. Berryhill	587 U.S. 471	May 28, 2019
A Social Security Administration Appeals Council dismissal on timeliness grounds after a claimant has had an ALJ hearing on the merits is a final decision subject to judicial review.
Box v. Planned Parenthood	587 U.S. 490	May 28, 2019
Overturned the stay on the fetal disposition clause, arguing that how the fetus is disposed has no impact on a woman's rights to an abortion.
Mont v. United States	587 U.S. 514	June 3, 2019
Whether a term of supervised release for one offense is paused by imprisonment for another offense within the meaning of 18 U.S.C. §3624(e).
Fort Bend Cnty. v. Davis	587 U.S. 541	June 3, 2019
The charge-filing precondition to suit set out in Title VII of the Civil Rights Act of 1964 is not a jurisdictional requirement.
Taggart v. Lorenzen	587 U.S. 554	June 3, 2019
A court may hold a creditor in civil contempt for violating a discharge order if there is no fair ground of doubt as to whether the order barred the creditor’s conduct.
Azar v. Allina Health Services	587 U.S. 566	June 3, 2019
Because the government has not identified a lawful excuse for neglecting its statutory notice-and-comment obligations, its policy must be vacated.
Parker Drilling Management Serv. v. Newton	587 U.S. 601	June 10, 2019
State laws can be "applicable and not inconsistent" with federal law under the Outer Continental Shelf Lands Act only if federal law does not address the relevant issue.
Return Mail Inc. v. United States Postal Service	587 U.S. 618	June 10, 2019
The government is not a "person" capable of instituting the three AIA review proceedings.
Quarles v. United States	587 U.S. 645	June 10, 2019
When deciding whether a state law is broader than a crime within the scope of the Armed Career Criminals Act, the state law’s "exact definition or label" does not control. So long as the state law in question substantially corresponds to (or is narrower than) that crime, the conviction qualifies.
Virginia House of Delegates v. Bethune-Hill	587 U.S. 658	June 17, 2019
The Virginia House of Delegates lacks standing to file this appeal, either representing the state’s interests or in its own right.
Gamble v. United States	587 U.S. 678	June 17, 2019
The court declined to overturn the separate sovereigns doctrine, concluding that historical precedent has held that it is a part of the Fifth Amendment.
Virginia Uranium, Inc. v. Warren	587 U.S. 761	June 17, 2019
The Atomic Energy Act does not preempt Virginia's moratorium on uranium mining
Manhattan Community Access Corp. v. Halleck	587 U.S. 802	June 17, 2019
A public access station was not considered a state actor for purposes of evaluating free speech issues.

== See also ==
- List of United States Supreme Court cases by the Roberts Court
- 2018 term opinions of the Supreme Court of the United States
