= Coles Hill, Virginia =

Unincorporated community in the U.S. state of Virginia

Coordinates: 36°52′32″N 79°18′02″W

Coles Hill is an unincorporated community in Pittsylvania County, in the U.S. state of Virginia. It is the site of the largest uranium deposit in the U.S.; however, a 1982 Virginia ban on uranium mining has kept its resources from being used commercially. The lode is the subject of an ongoing controversy about possible extraction. Lower courts ruled in favor of the state's ban; however, in October 2018 the case was scheduled to be heard by the Supreme Court. The Supreme Court upheld Virginia's ban on uranium mining in Virginia Uranium, Inc. v. Warren.
