= McDonough v. Smith =

2019 United States Supreme Court opinion

- Supreme Court of the United States

Argued April 17, 2019 Decided June 20, 2019
- Full case name: Edward G. McDonough v. Youel Smith, Individually and as Special District Attorney for the County of Rensselaer, New York (aka Trey Smith)
- Docket no.: 18-485
- Citations: 588 U.S. ___ (more) 139 S. Ct. 2149; 204 L. Ed. 2d 506

Case history
- Prior: Motion to dismiss granted, McDonough v. Smith, No. 1:15-cv-01505, 2016 WL 5717263 (N.D.N.Y. Sept. 30, 2016); motion for reconsideration denied, 2017 WL 1901962 (N.D.N.Y. May 8, 2017); affirmed, 898 F.3d 259 (2d Cir. 2018); cert, granted, 139 S. Ct. 915 (2019).

Holding
- The statute of limitations for a §1983 fabricated-evidence claim began to run when the criminal proceedings end in the §1983 plaintiff's favor.

Court membership
- Chief Justice John Roberts Associate Justices Clarence Thomas · Ruth Bader Ginsburg; Stephen Breyer · Samuel Alito; Sonia Sotomayor · Elena Kagan; Neil Gorsuch · Brett Kavanaugh

Case opinions
- Majority: Sotomayor, joined by Roberts, Ginsburg, Breyer, Alito, Kavanaugh
- Dissent: Thomas, joined by Kagan, Gorsuch

Laws applied
- 42 U.S.C. § 1983

McDonough v. Smith, 588 U.S. ___ (2019), was a United States Supreme Court case from the October 2018 term. In a 6–3 ruling, the Court held that the 3-year statute of limitations for a fabrication of evidence civil lawsuit under section 1983 of the Civil Rights Act begins to run when the criminal case ends in the plaintiff's favor.

This case was notable as a victory for criminal defendants; the precedent it set would make it easier to sue prosecutors and police for fabricating evidence against defendants. The Court's ruling also resolves a circuit split between United States Court of Appeals for the Second Circuit and other federal appeals courts.

== Case background ==
=== Case history ===
The Working Families Party (WFP) is a small political party in New York State. In September 2009, its Rensselaer County affiliate held a party primary to select its nominees for the upcoming Troy city council elections. During the primary, at least 50 absentee ballots were fraudulently obtained and cast by local political operatives attempting to gain control of the WFP's ballot line for the New York State Democratic Party. These ballots were submitted to Ed McDonough, who – as a commissioner of the Rensselaer County Board of Elections – was responsible for processing the applications. The scandal was exposed after a local Republican Party official, Robert Mirch, funded an initial investigation into reports that some absentee ballots that were cast in the WFP primary were fraudulent. Several residents swore affidavits claiming to have never filled out an absentee ballot application or to have never received or cast votes that were recorded in their name.

A county judge appointed special prosecutor, Youel "Trey" Smith, to conduct the investigation following the recusal of the local District Attorney, a Democrat. The resulting investigation led to eight indictments; of these, four individuals (two Democratic Party operatives, a city clerk, and a city councilman) pled guilty; the charges against two other former city councilmen were dropped). The two remaining defendants, former councilman Michael LoPorto and former Board of Elections Commissioner Ed McDonough, were tried twice; in their first trial, they were tried together and the jury deadlocked, necessitating a mistrial. In their second trials, which were conducted separately, both defendants were acquitted by their respective juries.

In his lawsuit, which was first filed in 2015 (just under 3 years since he was acquitted), McDonough claimed that Smith had intentionally framed him, fabricating evidence to link him to the ballot fraud case. According to McDonough, Smith falsified affidavits, coached witnesses to lie, and orchestrated a faulty DNA analysis to connect McDonough to the fraudulent ballot envelopes. For example, McDonough points to one witness who did not implicate McDonough before the grand jury but changed his testimony after allegedly receiving a phone call from Smith directing him to do so. McDonough alleged that Smith chose to frame him due to a political grudge that Smith had against his family.

== In lower courts ==
McDonough's case was filed in the United States District Court for the Northern District of New York under 42 USC 1983. He asserted two separate constitutional violations: denial of due process because of fabrication of evidence and malicious prosecution, which are violations of the Fourth, Fifth, Sixth, and Fourteenth Amendments to the United States Constitution. In late 2016, District Court dismissed the malicious prosecution claim because Smith had prosecutorial immunity. It then dismissed the fabricated-evidence claim due to the statute of limitations.

McDonough appealed his case to the United States Court of Appeals for the Second Circuit, which heard the case in late 2017. The case was heard by a three-judge panel consisting of Judges Christopher F. Droney, Reena Raggi, and Dennis Jacobs. Writing for the Second Circuit, Judge Droney upheld the District Court's ruling dismissing the lawsuit against Smith. The Second Circuit found that the statute of limitations on a fabricated-evidence claim runs when the plaintiff becomes aware of the fabricated evidence and has been deprived of liberty in some way. Under this framework, the statute of limitations began to run during McDonough's first trial, which took place more than three years before he filed his lawsuit. This approach created a circuit split since it contradicted the approaches taken by the Third, Ninth, and Tenth Circuits, each of which had held that the statute of limitations begins when the criminal proceedings ended.

McDonough appealed his case again, this time to the United States Supreme Court. He filed a writ of certiorari requesting that they hear the case in October 2018. The justices granted the writ, agreeing to hear the case in January 2019. In oral arguments before the Court, which took place in April 2019, McDonough was represented by Neal Katyal, former acting United States Solicitor General under President Barack Obama. Thomas O'Connor, from the Albany law firm Napierski, VanDenburgh, Napierski, & O'Connor, represented Smith.

== Supreme Court opinion ==
=== Majority opinion ===
In a 6–3 opinion written by Justice Sonia Sotomayor, the Supreme Court held that the three-year statute of limitations for fabricated-evidence claims under section 1983 of the Civil Rights Act did not begin until the case had been favorably adjudicated in favor of the plaintiff. Under common law, a statute of limitations usually begins to run once the plaintiff has a complete and present cause of action (e.g. once all elements of the tort have taken place). However, under certain circumstances, a claim can't be realistically filed while the violation is ongoing; under those circumstances, the statute of limitations may be delayed until a later time. In determining what common law principles to apply, the Supreme Court drew an analogy between McDonough's Constitutional fabricated-evidence claim and the common law tort known as malicious prosecution, which the Court found to be the tort most similar to McDonough's allegation. For malicious prosecution cases, the statute of limitations does not begin to run until the case is resolved in favor of the plaintiff. The Supreme Court opinion noted that the common law rule for malicious prosecution had a pragmatic purpose as well, to ensure that criminal and civil cases over the same subject matter would not overlap or result in conflicting determinations.

=== Dissent ===
The dissent, authored by Justice Clarence Thomas and joined by Justices Elena Kagan and Neil Gorsuch, argued that the Supreme Court should not have granted McDonough's petition for a writ of certiorari. The dissent noted that the nature and elements of his claim (e.g. the specific Constitutional rights he claims were violated) were not clearly defined, making it difficult to determine which common law principles should be applied.

=== Effect ===
The Supreme Court overturned the Second Circuit's initial decision against McDonough and allowed his case to go forward. Following the ruling, the Second Circuit issued an order returning the case to the Northern District in New York for further litigation.
