= Lorenzo v. SEC =

Lorenzo v. Securities and Exchange Commission
- Supreme Court of the United States

Argued December 3, 2018 Decided March 27, 2019
- Full case name: Francis V. Lorenzo v. Securities and Exchange Commission
- Docket no.: 17-1077
- Citations: 587 U.S. (more) 139 S. Ct. 1094; 203 L. Ed. 2d 484
- Opinion announcement: Opinion announcement

Case history
- Prior: 872 F.3d 578 (D.C. Cir. 2017); cert. granted, 138 S. Ct. 2650 (2018)

Holding
- A defendant can be held civilly liable by the SEC for participating in a securities fraud scheme by distributing false statements, even if those statements were written by another person.

Court membership
- Chief Justice John Roberts Associate Justices Clarence Thomas · Ruth Bader Ginsburg; Stephen Breyer · Samuel Alito; Sonia Sotomayor · Elena Kagan; Neil Gorsuch · Brett Kavanaugh

Case opinions
- Majority: Breyer, joined by Roberts, Ginsburg, Alito, Sotomayor, Kagan
- Dissent: Thomas, joined by Gorsuch
- Kavanaugh took no part in the consideration or decision of the case.

Laws applied
- Securities Exchange Act of 1934

Lorenzo v. Securities and Exchange Commission, 587 U.S. ___ (2019), was a United States Supreme Court case from the October 2018 term.

The Supreme Court held that someone who disseminates false statements to potential investors with the intent to defraud those investors can be held liable under subsection b of Rule 10b-5 of the Securities Exchange Act of 1934, even if they personally were not the ones who drafted the false statements.

This decision clarifies the applicability of the 2011 holding in Janus Capital Group, Inc. v. First Derivative Traders to individuals who disseminate false statements made by others. That decision had held that subsection (b) of Rule 10b-5 (which prohibits "mak[ing] any untrue statement of a material fact") applies only to the individual who personally drafted the false statements; this decision clarifies that other individuals who participate in the fraud scheme can be held liable under other subsections of Rule 10b-5.

It also marked one of the rare recent occasions in which the Securities and Exchange Commission prevailed in front of the Supreme Court, after defeats in prior cases including Gabelli v. SEC (2013), Kokesh v. SEC (2016), and Lucia v. SEC (2018).

== Background ==
Francis Vincent Lorenzo (Frank Lorenzo) was the former director of investment banking at Charles Vista LLC, a pennystock broker-dealer in Staten Island, New York. Lorenzo's only client at the time was a pennystock company called Waste2Energy Holdings Inc., a firm which claimed to be developing technology to transform solid waste into clean energy. In early 2009, Lorenzo was tasked with attempting to sell $15 million worth of convertible debentures (debt securities) issued by Waste2Energy. By October 2009, however, Waste2Energy had disclosed to the public and to Lorenzo that its intellectual property was worthless and that it had written off all of its intangible assets. Its remaining assets were worth approximately $370,000, far less than the value of its proposed debenture offering.

Despite this, Lorenzo continued attempting to sell the debentures on the market, sending emails to prospective investors which stated that the company had $10 million in 'confirmed assets', which would protect investors against losses. According to Lorenzo, his boss at Charles Vista LLC had supplied the content of the emails and approved their dissemination to investors. Throughout 2009 and 2010, investors purchased the debentures.

When Waste2Energy Holdings eventually collapsed and filed for bankruptcy in 2013, the Securities and Exchange Commission (SEC) filed an administrative case against Charles Vista, Lorenzo, and his former boss for violating section 17(a) of the Securities Act of 1933, Section 10(b), and Rule 10b-5. Charles Vista was also charged with violating the Exchange Act's Section 15(c) and rule 10b-5 of the Securities Exchange Act of 1934. All three entities were charged with being 'primary violators' of Rule 10b-5. Lorenzo's boss and Charles Vista agreed to settle the case, but Lorenzo himself went to trial before an administrative law judge (ALJ) at the SEC. In the hearing, Lorenzo insisted that he simply cut-and-pasted language given to him by his boss and that, under existing Supreme Court precedent, he should not be held liable for merely passing on someone else's false statements.

The SEC administrative law judge who heard the case accepted Lorenzo's claim that he had sent the fraudulent emails without really reading them or thinking about the contents. However, the administrative law judge still found that Lorenzo had willfully violated securities laws by making fraudulent misstatements and by participating in a scheme to defraud potential investors. Lorenzo was barred from the securities industry for life and fined $15,000. The full SEC affirmed the ALJ's decision but formally rejected his claim that he had sent the emails without reading them.

Lorenzo appealed the SEC's decision to federal court. As allowed by the Securities Exchange Act, Lorenzo was permitted to appeal the commission's ruling before either the DC Circuit Court of Appeals or the Circuit Court of Appeals in which he principally did business.

== In lower courts ==
=== Court of Appeals for the DC Circuit ===
Lorenzo's appeal was first heard by a three-judge panel United States Court of Appeals for the District of Columbia Circuit, which comprised circuit judges Sri Srinivasan, Brett Kavanaugh, and Thomas Griffith. Lorenzo's argument before the DC Circuit was that he could not be held liable for passing on false statements made by another person. By applying the decision from Janus Capital Group, Inc. v. First Derivative Traders, the DC Circuit ruled that Lorenzo did not violate subsection b of Rule 10b-5, holding the primary liability under that subsection can only be applied to the person who held 'ultimate authority' over the statement, including its content and whether and how it should be communicated. They affirmed Lorenzo's contention that his boss was the true 'maker' of the false statements since he was the one who asked Lorenzo to send the emails and was the one who supplied the content.

However, by a 2-to-1 vote (with Judge Kavanaugh dissenting), the DC Circuit held that Lorenzo was liable under subsections a and c of Rule 10b-5, which cover liability for participating in a fraud scheme (also known as "scheme" liability). Because the court ruled against the SEC on the Rule 10b-5 subsection b ruling, it vacated the penalties levied against Lorenzo by the SEC and sent the case back to the commission to reconsider Lorenzo's punishment in light of the ruling.

In his dissent, Judge Kavanaugh claimed that the majority opinion endorsed the SEC's efforts to "end-run the Supreme Court" by expanding primary liability for securities fraud. He stated the conduct described in Lorenzo's case may have been considered 'aiding and abetting' but that Lorenzo should not be considered a primary violator for passing along misstatements from his boss. He emphasized the distinction between primary liability and aiding and abetting, noting that prior Supreme Court cases (2008's Stoneridge Investment Partners v. Scientific-Atlanta, Inc. and 1994's Central Bank of Denver, N.A. v. First Interstate Bank of Denver, N.A.) had limited the ability of private plaintiffs to file suit against secondary actors (accused aiders and abettors) in a fraud case. Kavanaugh argued that the Court of Appeals's opinion here would have the effect of converting these secondary actors into primary violators through "scheme" liability, exposing them to additional liability (contradicting the Supreme Court's past rulings).

The DC Circuit's decision exacerbated a circuit split regarding this issue. Since 2005, the Second, Eighth, and Ninth Circuit Courts of Appeal had each held that fraudulent misstatements could not by themselves create "scheme" liability while the Eleventh Circuit had been more open to the idea.

=== Appeal to the Supreme Court ===
Lorenzo appealed the decision to the Supreme Court in January 2018. In June 2018, the Supreme Court granted his writ of certiorari agreeing to hear the case. The case was argued on December 3, 2018. Robert Heim, an attorney with the firm of Meyers & Heim LLP, argued the case on behalf of Lorenzo. Assistant Solicitor General Christopher Michel argued the case on behalf of the United States government. Because he was on the DC Circuit panel which heard the original case, Justice Brett Kavanaugh recused himself from participating in this case.

== Supreme Court opinion ==
The Supreme Court affirmed the DC Circuit's decision to impose "scheme" liability on Lorenzo. Writing for a 6–2 majority, Justice Stephen Breyer found that the language in subsections a and c of Rule 10b-5 were sufficiently broad to encompass Lorenzo's dissemination of false information with the intent to defraud. The majority opinion held that merely disseminating false statements was not enough to create "scheme" liability; it argued that the fraudulent course of conduct (planning the debenture sales, development of the fraud scheme, etc.) was part of the pattern of conduct needed to impose primary liability.

In dissent, Justice Clarence Thomas (joined by Justice Neil Gorsuch) argued that the majority opinion would render the Supreme Court's precedent in Janus a "dead letter".

This decision is noteworthy because it expanded the scope of primary liability for securities fraud, which is controversial in the securities industry. One potential repercussion of the ruling is that private plaintiffs may use the Lorenzo precedent to argue for expanded liability for deep-pocketed peripheral players in fraud schemes, such as accountants and attorneys, who otherwise would have been protected under the Private Securities Litigation Reform Act.
