= Parker Drilling Management Services v. Newton =

Parker Drilling Management Serv. v. Newton
- Supreme Court of the United States

Decided June 10, 2019
- Full case name: Parker Drilling Management Services v. Newton
- Docket no.: 18-389
- Citations: 587 U.S. ___ (more)

Holding
- State laws can be "applicable and not inconsistent" with federal law under the Outer Continental Shelf Lands Act only if federal law does not address the relevant issue.

Court membership
- Chief Justice John Roberts Associate Justices Clarence Thomas · Ruth Bader Ginsburg; Stephen Breyer · Samuel Alito; Sonia Sotomayor · Elena Kagan; Neil Gorsuch · Brett Kavanaugh

Case opinion
- Majority: Thomas, joined by unanimous

Laws applied
- Outer Continental Shelf Lands Act

Parker Drilling Management Serv. v. Newton, 587 U.S. ___ (2019), was a United States Supreme Court case in which the court held that state laws can be "applicable and not inconsistent" with federal law under the Outer Continental Shelf Lands Act only if federal law does not address the relevant issue.

== Background ==
Brian Newton worked for Parker Drilling Management Services on drilling platforms off the California coast. Newton was paid for his time on duty but not for his time on standby, during which he could not leave the platform. Newton filed a class action in state court, alleging that California’s minimum-wage and overtime laws required Parker to compensate him for his standby time. Parker removed the action to federal district court. The parties agreed that Parker's platforms were subject to the Outer Continental Shelf Lands Act (OCSLA), which provides that all law on the Outer Continental Shelf (OCS) is federal law, administered by federal officials; denies states any interest in or jurisdiction over the OCS; and deems the adjacent state's laws to be federal law only "[t]o the extent that they are applicable and not inconsistent with" other federal law. The district court concluded that the state laws relevant here should not be applied as federal law on the OCS because the Fair Labor Standards Act of 1938 (FLSA), a comprehensive federal wage-and-hour scheme, left no significant gap in federal law for state law to fill. It thus granted Parker judgment on the pleadings. The Ninth Circuit vacated and remanded. It held that state law is "applicable" under the OCSLA if it pertains to the subject matter at issue, a standard satisfied by California wage-and-hour laws. It also held that those state laws were not "inconsistent" with federal law because they were not incompatible with the federal scheme.
