= Virginia Uranium, Inc. v. Warren =

Virginia Uranium, Inc v. Warren
- Supreme Court of the United States

Argued November 5, 2018 Decided June 17, 2019
- Full case name: Virginia Uranium Inc., et al., v. John Warren, et al.
- Docket no.: 16-1275
- Citations: 587 U.S. 761 (more) 139 S. Ct. 1894; 204 L. Ed. 2d 377
- Opinion announcement: Opinion announcement

Case history
- Prior: Motion to dismiss granted, Virginia Uranium, Inc. v. McAuliffe, 147 F. Supp. 3d 462 (W.D. Va. 2015); affirmed sub nom. Virginia Uranium, Inc. v. Warren, 848 F.3d 590 (4th Cir. 2017); cert. granted, 138 S. Ct. 2023 (2018).

Holding
- The Atomic Energy Act does not preempt Virginia's moratorium on uranium mining

Court membership
- Chief Justice John Roberts Associate Justices Clarence Thomas · Ruth Bader Ginsburg; Stephen Breyer · Samuel Alito; Sonia Sotomayor · Elena Kagan; Neil Gorsuch · Brett Kavanaugh

Case opinions
- Plurality: Gorsuch, joined by Thomas, Kavanaugh
- Concurrence: Ginsburg (in judgment), joined by Sotomayor, Kagan
- Dissent: Roberts, joined by Breyer, Alito

Laws applied
- Atomic Energy Act of 1954, United States Constitution, Article VI

Virginia Uranium, Inc. v. Warren, 587 U.S. 761 (2019), was a United States Supreme Court case from the October 2018 term. In a split opinion, the Court held that the state of Virginia's ban on uranium mining did not conflict with the Atomic Energy Act, and let the ban stand.

This case is significant because of its strong impact on environmentalism as well as its discussion of the interplay between states' rights and federal supremacy. It also featured an extensive discussion as to what extent courts should evaluate a legislature's motive for passing a law.

== Background ==
Coles Hill, Virginia, in Pittsylvania County is the location of one of the largest known uranium deposits in the United States and the seventh largest uranium deposit in the world. The site's main uranium lode was discovered in 1979 on private land owned by the descendants of Walter Coles, who are now the founders and owners of Virginia Uranium, Incorporated. Though VUI owned the land containing the proposed uranium mine, it could not extract the uranium due to a 1982 state ban on uranium mining. Virginia enacted this law after the notorious Three Mile Island disaster in Harrisburg, Pennsylvania.

When uranium prices rose in the early 2000s, VUI renewed its efforts to develop the mine. Though VUI claimed that its proposed mining site would have generated up to $4.8 billion in net revenue for Virginia businesses, environmental groups criticized the plans, noting that uranium mining contributed to increased cancer rates, acidification of waterways, and air pollution. Local businesses also criticized the proposed uranium mining project, citing potential harm to agriculture, tourism, and other economic development opportunities. VUI lobbied the Virginia General Assembly to loosen the ban. State Senators John Watkins and Richard Saslaw sponsored a bill that would have created a licensing scheme for issuing uranium permits in 2013.

However, following the election of Virginia Governor Terry McAuliffe and his vow to veto any effort to lift the uranium ban, VUI decided to pursue a judicial remedy instead.

Broadly speaking, the development of uranium is a three step process: physically mining the uranium from the ground; milling the ore to produce yellowcake (urania); and safely securing the waste material (known as 'tailings'). The federal Atomic Energy Act of 1954 confers the responsibility for regulating the second and third steps of the process (milling ore to create yellowcake and storing the tailings) to the United States Atomic Energy Commission (now the Nuclear Regulatory Commission (NRC) following the Energy Reorganization Act of 1974). Regulating the first step (mining of ore) has traditionally been left up to the state governments.

VUI's argument is that Virginia's ban on mining was in fact motivated by health and safety concerns related to milling ore and storing the waste. Though VUI conceded that the state had the authority to regulate mining, they argued that the Virginia General Assembly's improper motivation for passing the law meant that it should be preempted by the federal Atomic Energy Act and the Supremacy Clause of the United States Constitution.

== In lower courts ==
VUI first took its case to the Western District Court of Virginia in November 2015. Judge Jackson L. Kiser of the Western District granted Virginia's motion to dismiss for failure to state a claim, ruling in part that the Atomic Energy Act did not conflict with Virginia's ban on uranium mining. Though the District Court acknowledged that prior Supreme Court precedent required states to have a non-safety rationale to regulate activities that were within the NRC's purview, it also determined that first phase of uranium development (mining) was not covered by the AEA. It also held that the District Court would not delve into the motivations of the state in passing the law.

VUI appealed this decision to the United States Court of Appeals for the Fourth Circuit in 2016. In 2017, the Fourth Circuit upheld the District Court's determination. VUI appealed again, this time to the United States Supreme Court, which granted a writ of certiorari agreeing to hear the case on May 21, 2018. Attorney Charles J. Cooper, founder of the law firm Cooper & Kirk, PLLC, argued the case on behalf of Virginia Uranium. Toby J. Heytens, the Solicitor General of Virginia, represented the state before the Supreme Court.

== Supreme Court opinion ==
On June 17, 2019, the Supreme Court ruled in favor of Virginia and upheld the state ban. Justice Neil Gorsuch announced the judgment of the Court and authored an opinion joined by Justices Clarence Thomas and Brett Kavanaugh. The Court held that the Virginia moratorium on uranium mining was not preempted by the federal Atomic Energy Act. Gorsuch's opinion emphasized that the plain language of the Atomic Energy Act was that it regulated activity only after the uranium was removed from the earth, leaving regulation of mining activity to the states. Gorsuch also rejected the approach of examining the state legislature's purpose for enacting the ban, stating that such an inquiry would generate unnecessary inconsistencies and intrude on the state legislature's ability to have a free and open debate.

Justice Ruth Bader Ginsburg, writing for herself and for Justices Sonia Sotomayor and Elena Kagan, wrote a separate opinion concurring with Gorsuch's final judgment. However, they did not join the part of Gorsuch's opinion which discussed role of inquiring into the state legislature's purpose, which they viewed as falling outside the scope of the case.

Chief Justice John Roberts dissented, joined by Justices Stephen Breyer and Samuel Alito. Roberts asserted that the majority failed to reckon with whether a state could indirectly regulate a preempted activity (such as the milling and storage of uranium) by regulating a non-preempted activity (such as mining).
