= Virginia House of Delegates v. Bethune-Hill =

- Supreme Court of the United States

Argued March 18, 2019 Decided June 17, 2019
- Full case name: Virginia House of Delegates v. Bethune-Hill
- Docket no.: 18-281
- Citations: 587 U.S. 658 (more) 139 S. Ct. 1945; 204 L. Ed. 2d 305

Case history
- Prior: Bethune-Hill v. Va. State Bd. of Elections, 326 F. Supp. 3d 128 (E.D. Va. 2018); probable jurisdiction noted, 136 S. Ct. 2406 (2016); affirmed in part, reversed in part, and remanded, Bethune-Hill v. Virginia State Bd. of Elections, No. 15-680, 580 U.S. ___, 137 S. Ct. 788 (2017); ruling in favor of plaintiffs on remand, 326 F. Supp. 3d 128 (E.D. Va. 2018).

Holding
- The Virginia House of Delegates lacks standing to file this appeal, either representing the state’s interests or in its own right.

Court membership
- Chief Justice John Roberts Associate Justices Clarence Thomas · Ruth Bader Ginsburg; Stephen Breyer · Samuel Alito; Sonia Sotomayor · Elena Kagan; Neil Gorsuch · Brett Kavanaugh

Case opinions
- Majority: Ginsburg, joined by Thomas, Sotomayor, Kagan, Gorsuch
- Dissent: Alito, joined by Roberts, Breyer, Kavanaugh

Virginia House of Delegates v. Bethune-Hill, 587 U.S. 658 (2019), was a case argued before the United States Supreme Court on March 18, 2019, in which the Virginia House of Delegates appealed against the decision in 2018 by the district court that 11 of Virginia's voting districts were racially gerrymandered, and thus unconstitutional. The Court held the "Virginia House of Delegates lacks standing to file this appeal, either representing the state's interests or in its own right." In other words, the court upheld the decision made by a federal district court ruling in June 2018 that 11 state legislative districts were an illegal racial gerrymander. This was following a previous (2017) case, Bethune-Hill v. Virginia State Bd. of Elections.

== Background ==
In 2011, Virginia was subject to Section 5 of the Voting Rights Act of 1965, which prohibited the redistricting process from eliminating districts that were made largely of minority groups to discourage their preferred candidates from taking office. Delegate Steven Christopher Jones from the Virginia House of Delegates ensured there were 11 voting districts in which 55% of the voters were African American. By isolating the "African American vote," Jones' actions allowed for populations of the remaining state districts in Virginia to remain dominantly white, securing Republican seats in Virginia's House. Virginia has 100 seats in the House and 40 in the Senate.

On December 22, 2014, in Virginia, 12 voters filed suit in the United States District Court for the Eastern District of Virginia that the government participated in racial gerrymandering and thus violated the Equal Protection Clause of the 14th Amendment. However, the district court rejected the argument, dismissing the case on October 22, 2015. The plaintiffs appealed the decision, which the Supreme Court accepted.

On March 1, 2017, the Supreme Court decided in a 5-4 majority opinion that the district court that held the case had "applied the wrong legal standards in evaluating the challengers' claims of racial gerrymandering." Therefore, the court upheld only one of the districts and dismissed the rest of the case for the district court, allowing the district court to reconsider the constitutionality of the remaining 11 districts.

Eventually, in June 2018, the lower court deemed the 11 districts unconstitutional, concluding that race was a substantial factor in determining the boundaries of the districts. The Virginia House of Delegates had attempted to place the exact same percentage of African-American voters in each of the districts, claiming that it was necessary to do so in order to comply with federal voting-rights laws. However, the lower court did not find the government's actions necessary, and thus declared the 11 districts unconstitutional. The district court gave the legislature until October 30, 2018 to redraw district lines. However, the redrawing of district lines was met with partisan conflicts, as Republicans feared that redrawing the lines would threaten their majority in the House while the Democrats supported an end to Virginia's racial gerrymandering.

Amongst the conflict, the Virginia House of Delegates appealed the decision to the Supreme Court, which agreed to review the case and whether the Virginia House of Delegates had standing to appeal. The Virginia House of Delegates had filed the appeal independently of Virginia's State Attorney General who claimed the State would not appeal the case.

== Standing of the plaintiff ==
The plaintiff took the standing that in order to pursue litigation, the party must be harmed by the resolution of the litigation. While the State as a primary defendant has standing to litigate, the Virginia House alone is not believed to have standing to litigate. Justices were divided on the issue in an apparent cross-ideological split.

== Questions facing the court ==
The Supreme Court faced this case with the following three questions in mind.

Did the district (lower) court have enough evidence to declare that the Virginia House of Delegates was in fact gerrymandering the 11 districts?

Did the district court make a mistake in holding that the Virginia House of Delegates "did not satisfy its burden to show that the legislature's use of race was narrowly tailored to achieve the compelling state interest of compliance with Section 5 of the VRA 52 U.S.C. § 10304?"

Does the Virginia House of Delegates have standing to file an appeal?

Whether the district court erred in relying on expert analysis it previously rejected as unreliable and irrelevant and expert analysis that lacked any objective or coherent methodology?

== Conclusion of the case ==
In a 5-4 majority in the Roberts Court, the Supreme Court held that "the Virginia House of Delegates lacks standing to file this appeal, either representing the state's interests or in its own right." Justices Thomas, Ginsburg, Sotomayor, Kagan, and Gorsuch all voted in favor of rejecting the appeal while Justices Roberts, Breyer, Alito, and Kavanaugh voted to support it. Ultimately, the Virginia House Republicans were not successful in their appeal which allowed Democrats to become the majority in the Virginia bicameral legislature in the 2019 elections for the first time since 1995.

== Opinion of the Court ==
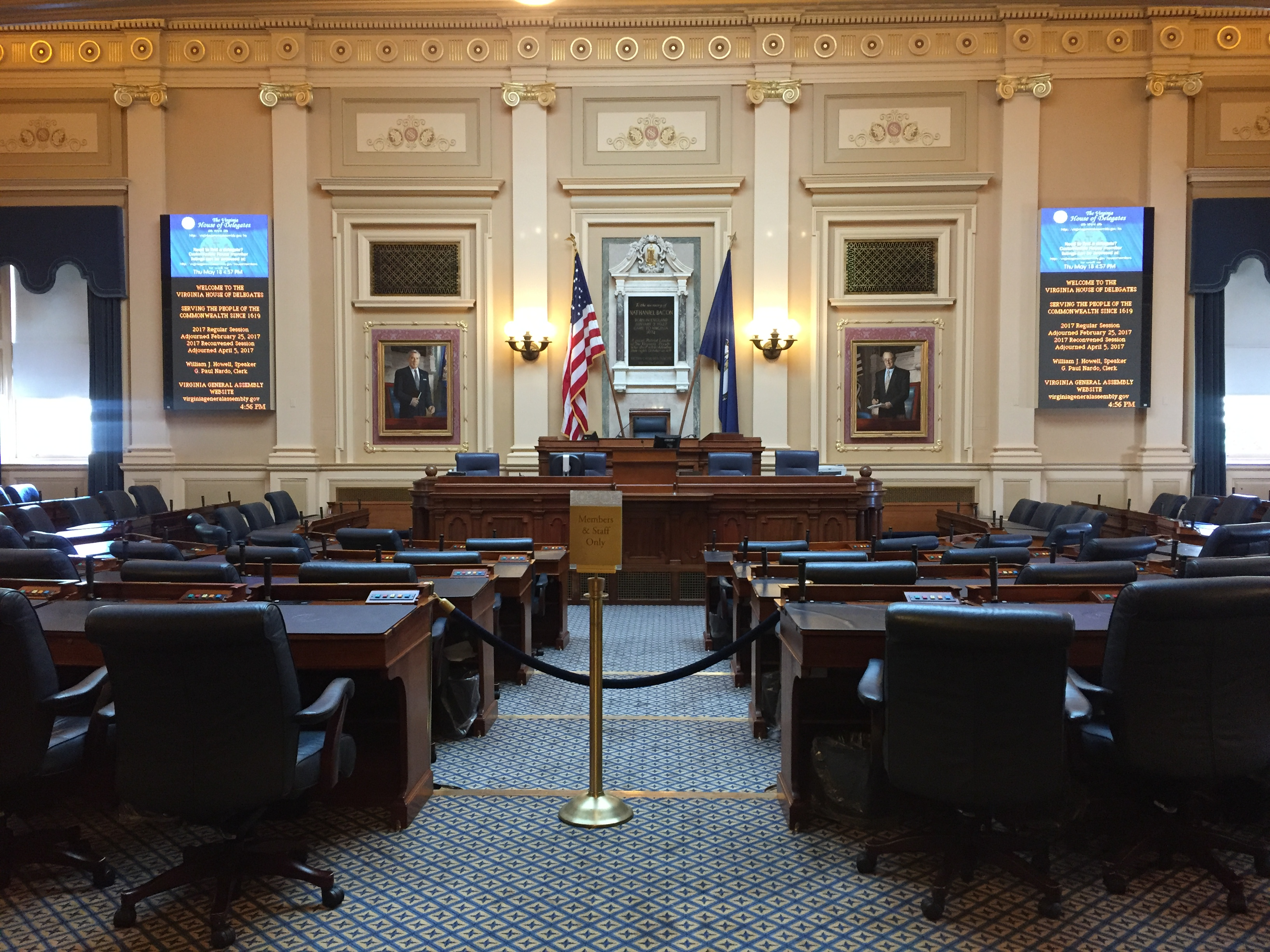
Image of the Virginia House of Delegates Chamber in 2017

In order to file for appeal, the litigant must have judicial standing. In other words, this means that the litigant must show a "concrete and particularized injury, that is fairly traceable to the challenged conduct and is likely to be redressed by a favorable decision." Because the Virginia House of Delegates served as an intervenor, it must file for appeal on its own standing. However, the court decided that the House of Delegates did not demonstrate standing on its own and thus cannot challenge the result of the case in court.

In order to determine whether the House of Delegates had standing, the court had to consider whether the House represented both the state's interests and its own. In Virginia, "the authority of representing the state's interests in civil litigation lies exclusively with the state attorney general." In this situation, Attorney General Mark R. Herring had stated that he did not want to appeal the case. Since the attorney general is not tied to the House of Delegates, the House therefore does not have standing to file an appeal on behalf of Virginia. The House also never indicated that it was representing the State in the District Court, thus the House was only representing its own interests. In reference to whether the House of Delegates has standing on its own, the Court again concluded that it does not, stating that a "judicial decision invalidating state law" did not inflict any injury to the House of Delegates.

In response to the majority opinion of the court, Justice Samuel Alito, backed by the other dissenting judges, stated that the House did in fact have standing because the new redistricting plan would injure the House by affecting who was elected to it. Alito was critical of the impermissible blurring of the standings of the congress and state legislatures. He believed separation of powers is not required for state legislative standings.

== Voting Rights Act of 1965 ==
Section 2 of the Voting Rights Act of 1965 states that "No voting qualification or prerequisite to voting, or standard, practice, or procedure shall be imposed or applied by any State or political subdivision to deny or abridge the right of any citizen of the United States to vote on account of race or color." In other words, Section 2 mandates that the drawing of electoral districts cannot "improperly dilute minorities' voting power." Along with the Equal Protection Clause of the 14th Amendment, Section 2 of the Voting Rights Act ensures that citizens are offered equal representation, specifically through the voting process.

== Redistricting ==
The redrawing of state district lines, also known as redistricting, has a tremendous effect in creating more competition amongst future candidates in the state legislature. Jennifer Clark, a political science professor at the University of Houston, commented on redistricting, stating that "The redistricting process has important consequences for voters. In some states, incumbent legislators work together to protect their own seats, which produces less competition in the political system. Voters may feel as though they do not have a meaningful alternative to the incumbent legislator. Legislators who lack competition in their districts have less incentive to adhere to their constituents' opinions."

In 2006, Emory University professor Alan Abramowitz and Ph.D. students Brad Alexander and Matthew Gunning also commented on redistricting, stating that "[Some] studies have concluded that redistricting has a neutral or positive effect on competition. ... [It] is often the case that partisan redistricting has the effect of reducing the safety of incumbents, thereby making elections more competitive."
