= Taggart v. Lorenzen =

- Supreme Court of the United States

Decided June 3, 2019
- Full case name: Taggart v. Lorenzen
- Docket no.: 18-489
- Citations: 587 U.S. ___ (more)

Holding
- A court may hold a creditor in civil contempt for violating a discharge order if there is no fair ground of doubt as to whether the order barred the creditor’s conduct.

Court membership
- Chief Justice John Roberts Associate Justices Clarence Thomas · Ruth Bader Ginsburg; Stephen Breyer · Samuel Alito; Sonia Sotomayor · Elena Kagan; Neil Gorsuch · Brett Kavanaugh

Case opinion
- Majority: Breyer, joined by unanimous

Taggart v. Lorenzen, 587 U.S. ___ (2019), was a United States Supreme Court case in which the court held that a court may hold a creditor in civil contempt for violating a discharge order if there is no fair ground of doubt as to whether the order barred the creditor’s conduct.

== Background ==
Bradley Taggart formerly owned an interest in an Oregon company. That company and two of its other owners filed suit in Oregon state court, claiming that Taggart had breached the company's operating agreement. Before trial, Taggart filed for bankruptcy under Chapter 7 of the Bankruptcy Code. At the conclusion of that proceeding, the federal Bankruptcy Court issued a discharge order that released Taggart from liability for most pre-bankruptcy debts. After the discharge order issued, the Oregon state court entered judgment against Taggart in the pre=bankruptcy suit and awarded attorney's fees to the creditors. Taggart returned to the federal Bankruptcy Court, seeking civil contempt sanctions against the creditors for collecting attorney's fees in violation of the discharge order. The Bankruptcy Court ultimately held the creditors in civil contempt. The Bankruptcy Appellate Panel vacated the sanctions, and the Ninth Circuit affirmed the panel's decision. Applying a subjective standard, the Ninth Circuit concluded that a "creditor’s good faith belief" that the discharge order "does not apply to the creditor’s claim precludes a finding of contempt, even if the creditor’s belief if unreasonable."
