= Fort Bend County v. Davis =

- Supreme Court of the United States

Decided June 2, 2019
- Full case name: Fort Bend County v. Davis
- Docket no.: 18-525
- Citations: 587 U.S. ___ (more)

Holding
- The charge-filing precondition to suit set out in Title VII of the Civil Rights Act of 1964 is not a jurisdictional requirement.

Court membership
- Chief Justice John Roberts Associate Justices Clarence Thomas · Ruth Bader Ginsburg; Stephen Breyer · Samuel Alito; Sonia Sotomayor · Elena Kagan; Neil Gorsuch · Brett Kavanaugh

Case opinion
- Majority: Ginsburg, joined by unanimous

Laws applied
- Civil Rights Act of 1964

Fort Bend County v. Davis, 587 U.S. ___ (2019), was a United States Supreme Court case in which the court held that the charge-filing precondition to suit set out in Title VII of the Civil Rights Act of 1964 is not a jurisdictional requirement.

== Background ==
Title VII of the Civil Rights Act of 1964 prohibits discrimination in employment on the basis of race, color, religion, sex, or national origin. The Act instructs a complainant, before commencing a Title VII action in court, to file a charge with the Equal Employment Opportunity Commission (EEOC or Commission). On receipt of a charge, the EEOC is to notify the employer and investigate the allegations. The Commission may "endeavor to eliminate [the] alleged unlawful employment practice by informal methods of... conciliation." The EEOC also has first option to "bring a civil action" against the employer in court. But the commission has no authority itself to adjudicate discrimination complaints. If the EEOC chooses not to sue, and whether or not the EEOC otherwise acts on the charge, a complainant is entitled to a "right-to-sue" notice 180 days after the charge is filed. On receipt of the right-to-sue notice, the complainant may commence a civil action against her employer.

Lois M. Davis filed a charge against her employer, Fort Bend County. Davis alleged sexual harassment and retaliation for reporting the harassment. While her EEOC charge was pending, Fort Bend fired Davis because she failed to show up for work on a Sunday and went to a church event instead. Davis attempted to supplement her EEOC charge by handwriting "religion" on a form called an "intake questionnaire," but she did not amend the formal charge document. Upon receiving a right-to-sue letter, Davis commenced suit in federal district court, alleging discrimination on account of religion and retaliation for reporting sexual harassment.

After years of litigation, only the religion-based discrimination claim remained in the case. Fort Bend then asserted for the first time that the district court lacked jurisdiction to adjudicate Davis' case because her EEOC charge did not state a religion-based discrimination claim. The district court agreed and granted Fort Bend's motion to dismiss Davis' suit. On appeal from the dismissal, the Court of Appeals for the Fifth Circuit reversed. Title VII's charge-filing requirement, the Court of Appeals held, is not jurisdictional; instead, the requirement is prudential prerequisite to suit, forfeited in Davis' case because Fort Bend had waited too long to raise the objection.
