= Azar v. Allina Health Services =

- Supreme Court of the United States

Argued January 15, 2019 Decided June 2, 2019
- Full case name: Alex M. Azar II, Secretary of Health and Human Services v. Allina Health Services et al.
- Docket no.: 17-1484
- Citations: 587 U.S. ___ (more) 139 S. Ct. 1804
- Argument: Oral argument
- Opinion announcement: Opinion announcement

Case history
- Prior: Allina Health Servs. v. Burwell, 201 F. Supp. 3d 94 (D.D.C. 2016); reversed sub nom., Allina Health Servs. v. Price, 863 F.3d 937 (D.C. Cir. 2017); cert. granted, 139 S. Ct. 51 (2018).

Holding
- Because the government has not identified a lawful excuse for neglecting its statutory notice-and-comment obligations, its policy must be vacated.

Court membership
- Chief Justice John Roberts Associate Justices Clarence Thomas · Ruth Bader Ginsburg; Stephen Breyer · Samuel Alito; Sonia Sotomayor · Elena Kagan; Neil Gorsuch · Brett Kavanaugh

Case opinions
- Majority: Gorsuch, joined by Roberts, Thomas, Ginsburg, Alito, Sotomayor, Kagan
- Dissent: Breyer
- Kavanaugh took no part in the consideration or decision of the case.

Azar v. Allina Health Services, 587 U.S. ___ (2019), was a United States Supreme Court case in which the Court held the Department of Health and Human Services' new policy to retroactively reduce Medicare payments must be vacated due to the department's failure to uphold its notice-and-comment obligations.

== Background ==
In 2014, the Centers for Medicare and Medicaid Services (CMS) announced on its website the "Medicare fractions" for hospitals for the year 2012. As part of the posting, CMS declared that, when determining the "Medicare fraction" of Medicare disproportionate share hospital payments, Medicare Part C days would be included in the calculations. This decision underwent a notice-and-comment period in 2013, but the Department of Health and Human Services attempted to apply its interpretation retroactively to 2012.

Under the Social Security Act, a notice-and-comment period is required for a "rule, requirement or statement of policy" that establishes or changes a "substantive legal standard governing the scope of benefits, the payment for services, or the eligibility of individuals, entities, or organizations to furnish or receive services or benefits." 42 U.S.C. § 1395hh(a)(2). This requirement is stricter than the more common notice-and-comment requirements of the Administrative Procedure Act, which do not apply to "interpretive rules" or "general statements of policy."

== Procedural history ==
After this new payment schedule was published, a group of hospitals sued the government, claiming that the change had not properly undergone a notice-and-comment period. The department, however, argued that it was not required to hold a notice-and-comment period for the new rule, since it was only advising the public on an existing interpretation of the law and thus that the lower standard of the Administrative Procedures Act governed, rather than the stricter requirements of the Social Security Act.

The United States District Court for the District of Columbia ruled in favor of the department and upheld the legality of the payment schedule. The United States Court of Appeals for the District of Columbia Circuit reversed, ruling in favor of the hospitals on the basis that the new payment schedule amounted to a "statement of policy" that required the notice-and-comment period specified by the Social Security Act. The Supreme Court granted certiorari.

== Opinion of the Court ==
In a 7–1 ruling, the Supreme Court upheld the appellate court's ruling. Writing for the Court, Justice Gorsuch found that the department's decision rose to the level of changing a "substantive legal standard" within the meaning of the Social Security Act. He rejected the government's arguments that a "substantive legal standard" was the same as a "substantive rule" under the APA, and that since the change in payments did not amount to a "substantive rule" under the APA, it likewise didn't qualify as changing a "substantive legal standard."

Justice Breyer dissented. Justice Kavanaugh, who wrote the opinion of the D.C. Circuit prior to his appointment to the Supreme Court, took no part in the consideration of this case.
