= Return Mail Inc. v. United States Postal Service =

- Supreme Court of the United States

Argued February 19, 2019 Decided June 10, 2019
- Full case name: Return Mail Inc. v. United States Postal Service, et al.
- Docket no.: 17-1594
- Citations: 587 U.S. (more) 139 S. Ct. 1853; 204 L. Ed. 2d 179

Case history
- Prior: 868 F.3d 1350 (Fed. Cir. 2017), cert. granted, 139 S. Ct. 397 (2018)

Holding
- The government is not a "person" capable of instituting the three AIA review proceedings.

Court membership
- Chief Justice John Roberts Associate Justices Clarence Thomas · Ruth Bader Ginsburg; Stephen Breyer · Samuel Alito; Sonia Sotomayor · Elena Kagan; Neil Gorsuch · Brett Kavanaugh

Case opinions
- Majority: Sotomayor, joined by Roberts, Thomas, Alito, Gorsuch, Kavanaugh
- Dissent: Breyer, joined by Ginsburg, Kagan

Return Mail Inc. v. United States Postal Service, No. 17–1594, 587 U.S. ___ (2019), was a case before the United States Supreme Court, related to the separation of powers doctrine. More specifically, it deals with the question whether a government agency (i.e. the executive branch) can act as a "person" to challenge a patent through an administrative (non-judicial) patent review within the 2011 Leahy-Smith America Invents Act. The Supreme Court, in a 6–3 decision, ruled that within context of Leahy-Smith, the government does not constitute a "person".

== Background ==
The Leahy-Smith America Invents Act was passed in 2011 to refine the patent system. Among its major changes include the introduction of a post-grant opposition system, allowing a "person who is not the owner of a patent" to issue a challenge to one or more claims of a patent that has been granted.

Around 1999, Mitch Hungerpiller got the idea of using computerized systems and bar code scanners to help corporations to determine the fate of returned and undelivered mailings to their clients, allowing corporations to update their databases, eliminate names, and otherwise handling mail more efficiently. He established Return Mail, Inc. to provide this service to corporate customers. Hungerpiller applied for and was granted a patent for this system in 2004.

One potential customer of the system was the United States Postal Service (USPS). The USPS had spoken to Hungerpiller before and after the patent was granted about licensing the technology, and while they negotiated a licensing deal, the USPS ultimately developed a similar system in-house by 2006 (the OneCode system), negating the need to license the patented system. This had a significant effect on the financial status of Return Mail, Inc., with Hungerpiller forced to lay off many of his staff.

The USPS sought ex parte reexamination of Hungerpiller's patent in 2006, seeking to negate it. The United States Patent and Trademark Office reviewed the request but ultimately decided that the patent was still valid. Hungerpiller, in return, sought legal tort action against the USPS within the United States Court of Federal Claims in 2011, under 28 U.S.C. § 1498 for using the patented process without a license. While the Federal Claims case was ongoing, the USPS used the recently passed Leahy-Smith Act to seek a covered business method (CBM) review of Hungerpiller's patent though the Patent office, as allowed for under the Act's new post-grant review processes. The Patent Office agreed with the USPS' assertions, and invalidated the whole of Hungerpiller's patent. Hungerpiller challenged the ruling to the Federal Circuit Appeals Court. There, a 2-1 majority found for the Patent Office's invalidation, further stating that the wording of Leahy-Smith Act did not exclude the government as a "person" that can challenge the validity of a patent.

Prior to 2019 " the government had used AIA reviews only sparingly." A "government attorney told the justices at oral arguments in February that as of that time, federal agencies had filed a total of 20 AIA petitions."

== Supreme Court ==
The Supreme Court accepted the petition and heard the case on February 19, 2019. The Court issued its decision on June 10, 2019, reversing and remanding the Federal Appeals Court decision. Justice Sotomayor, writing for the 6-3 majority, stated that the Leahy-Smith Act does not prescribe any language that the government can be considered a person within the Act, and thus cannot challenge a patent.

"In the absence of an express definition of the term “person” in the patent statutes, the Court applies a “longstanding interpretive presumption that ‘person’ does not include the sovereign,” and thus excludes a federal agency like the Postal Service. Vermont Agency of Natural Resources v. United States ex rel. Stevens, 529 U. S. 765, 780–781. This presumption reflects “common usage,” United States v. Mine Workers, 330 U. S. 258, 275, as well as an express directive from Congress in the Dictionary Act, 1 U.S.C.§1. The Dictionary Act does not include the Federal Government among the persons listed in the definition of “person” that courts use “[i]n determining the meaning of any Act of Congress, unless the context indicates otherwise,” §1. Contrary to the Postal Service's contention otherwise, this Court has, in several instances, applied the presumption against treating the Government as a statutory person even when, as here, doing so would exclude the Government or one of its agencies from accessing a benefit or favorable procedural device. See, e.g., United States v. Cooper Corp., 312 U. S. 600, 604–605, 614. Thus, the Court here proceeds from the presumption that the Government is not a “person” authorized to initiate these proceedings absent an affirmative showing to the contrary. "

" Finally, the Postal Service argues that it must be a “person” who may petition for AIA review proceedings because, like other potential infringers, it is subject to civil liability and can assert a defense of patent invalidity. It would thus be anomalous, the Postal Service posits, to deny it a benefit afforded to other infringers— namely, the ability to challenge a patent de novo before the Patent Office, rather than only with clear and convincing evidence in defense to an infringement suit. Federal agencies, however, face lower and more calculable risks than nongovernmental actors, so it is reasonable for Congress to have treated them differently. Excluding federal agencies from AIA review proceedings also avoids the awkward situation of having a civilian patent owner defend the patentability of her invention in an adversarial, adjudicatory proceeding initiated by one federal agency and overseen by a different federal agency [wherein both agencies belong to the same executive branch]." At the same time, the executive branch of the Federal Government can challenge patent validity in courts, because courts are not a part of the executive branch.

The Supreme Court's opinion noted that since 1981, the U.S. Patent and Trademark Office has allowed government agencies to file ex parte reexaminations. In those proceedings, parties can bring information to the attention of the USPTO, which can then decide whether to reexamine the patent's validity in a proceeding, where the challenger is not involved. Because the third party is not involved in the ex parte process, the Federal government can initiate this process without violating separation of powers. The Court's ruling did not answer the questions whether Federal executive agencies can initiate inter party reviews, but following the logic of the majority, they cannot.
