= Box v. Planned Parenthood of Indiana and Kentucky, Inc. =

- Supreme Court of the United States

Decided May 28, 2019
- Full case name: Kristina Box, Commissioner, Indiana Department of Health, et al. v. Planned Parenthood of Indiana and Kentucky, Inc., et al.
- Docket no.: 18-483
- Citations: 587 U.S. 490 (more) 139 S. Ct. 1780; 204 L. Ed. 2d 78

Case history
- Prior: Preliminary injunction granted, Planned Parenthood of Ind. & Ky., Inc. v. Ind. Dep't of Health, 194 F. Supp. 3d 818 (S.D. Ind. 2016); Summary judgment and permanent injunction granted, 265 F. Supp. 3d 859 (S.D. Ind. 2017); Affirmed, 888 F.3d 300 (7th Cir. 2018); Rehearing en banc denied, 917 F.3d 532 (7th Cir. 2018).

Court membership
- Chief Justice John Roberts Associate Justices Clarence Thomas · Ruth Bader Ginsburg; Stephen Breyer · Samuel Alito; Sonia Sotomayor · Elena Kagan; Neil Gorsuch · Brett Kavanaugh

Case opinions
- Per curiam
- Concurrence: Thomas
- Concur/dissent: Ginsburg
- Concur/dissent: Sotomayor (did not file or join an opinion)

Box v. Planned Parenthood of Indiana and Kentucky, Inc., No. 18-483, 587 U.S. 490 (2019), was a United States Supreme Court case dealing with the constitutionality of a 2016 anti-abortion law passed in the state of Indiana. Indiana's law sought to ban abortions performed solely on the basis of the fetus' gender, race, ethnicity, or disabilities. Lower courts had blocked enforcement of the law for violating a woman's right to abortion under privacy concerns within the Fourteenth Amendment, as previously found in the landmark cases Roe v. Wade and Planned Parenthood v. Casey. The lower courts also blocked enforcement of another portion of the law that required the disposal of aborted fetuses through burial or cremation. The per curiam decision by the Supreme Court overturned the injunction on the fetal disposal portion of the law, but otherwise did not challenge or confirm the lower courts' ruling on the non-discrimination clauses, leaving these in place.

The case gained national interest as the first major abortion-related case to be heard by the Supreme Court since the retirement of Justice Anthony Kennedy (who tended to favor abortion rights) with his replacement Justice Brett Kavanaugh (who has appeared to rule against such rights in his previous limited judicial history). Court observers expressed concern that in opposing comments raised between Justices Clarence Thomas and Ruth Bader Ginsburg could result in later abortion-related challenges reaching the Supreme Court and potentially overturn parts of Roe v. Wade.

== Background ==
Since around 2010, several states with Republican leadership and conservative populations started to pass laws restricting abortion rights to some degree. In more recent years, with the onset of the presidency of Donald Trump and his nominations of Justices Neil Gorsuch and Brett Kavanaugh to the Supreme Court to replace Antonin Scalia and Anthony Kennedy, these laws have appeared designed to create a necessary legal vehicle to be heard by the Supreme Court as to challenge the long-standing provision of the 1973 landmark case Roe v. Wade. That case decided that women have constitutional rights to an abortion, but this is not an absolute right, and states can enact abortion-restricting laws to protect women and their unborn children during the latter trimesters of pregnancy. One type of law passed placed limits on the locations of abortion clinics, requiring them to be near hospitals and requiring doctors performing abortions to have admitting privileges at that hospital, purportedly to ensure that if something goes wrong during the abortion process, the female patient can receive immediate care. This type of restriction was determined to be unconstitutional in the Supreme Court case Whole Woman's Health v. Hellerstedt that struck down a Texas law with these limits.

In the present case, the Republican-controlled legislation of Indiana passed House Bill 1337, a "Sex Selective and Disability Abortion Ban", and which was signed into law by Mike Pence in March 2016. Among other requirements, the bill added three key clauses related to those seeking abortions and their practice. The non-discrimination clause banned abortions which were being performed for reasons solely related to gender, race, ethnicity, or detectable disabilities, such as Down syndrome, and put liabilities on doctors that proceeded to perform such abortions. The informed consent clause required that women undergoing abortions be notified at least 18 hours before their operation regarding the non-discrimination clause and the legal ramifications. Finally, the fetal disposition clause required that abortion clinics bury or incinerate fetal material if the female patient did not take control of it, treating the fetal remains the same as a deceased person. On passage, the law was met with sharp criticism from pro-abortion groups, including Planned Parenthood since the law strictly limited abortion rights.

Within weeks of passage, Planned Parenthood of Indiana and Kentucky, Inc. (PPINK) sought a stay of the law from going into effect that July while they challenged it in court. The United States District Court for the Southern District of Indiana agreed that PPINK's case has merit, and issued an injunction on June 30, 2016, to block enforcement of the new law. Both PPINK and the state of Indiana sought to get a summary judgement on the case in district court; the court granted summary judgement to PPINK stating that all three provisions of the law were unconstitutional, and permanently barred the state from enforcing the law.

The state appealed to the Seventh Circuit, which upheld the lower court's ruling in an April 2018 decision. The Seventh Circuit agreed with the lower court, asserting that the non-discrimination clause violated the Fourteenth Amendment for a women's right to privacy as determined in both Roe v. Wade and in Planned Parenthood v. Casey, and by extension, the informed consent clause was also unconstitutional. The Seventh Circuit ruled the fetal disposition clause as failing due process as Roe and additional case law did not recognize the fetus as a person and thus requiring the same process for disposal as for a person violated due process.

== Supreme Court ==
Indiana petitioned to the Supreme Court by September 2018; this was after Justice Neil Gorsuch had assumed his role on the Supreme Court, while Brett Kavanaugh's nomination was being heard by the United States Senate. The state presented two questions to the Court, the first regarding the fetal disposal clause of the law and the second on the non-discrimination clause. The Court issued a per curiam decision on May 28, 2019, in which it granted certiorari on the first question and overturned the stay on the fetal disposition clause, arguing that how the fetus is disposed has no impact on a woman's rights to an abortion. The Court denied certiorari with regard to the second question on non-discrimination, leaving the lower court's injunction on the non-discrimination and informed consent clauses in place, opting not to consider the merits until at least one other Circuit Court had ruled on such an issue, following its ordinary practice.

Both Justices Clarence Thomas and Ruth Bader Ginsburg wrote additional opinions on the per curiam decision. Justice Thomas' opinion compared abortion practices and birth control to eugenics, cautioning that abortion and birth control could become a "tool of eugenic manipulation", and emphasized the need for the Supreme Court to address the scope of what their Roe v. Wade decision has allowed. Ginsburg, a strong supporter of abortion rights, dissented from the reversal of the fetal disposal clause injunction, writing, "This case implicates the right of a woman to choose to have an abortion before viability and to obtain it without undue interference from the state". Both Thomas' and Ginsburg's opinions included biting footnotes to the other's opinion. Justice Sonia Sotomayor stated separately that she would have denied certiorari on both questions posed by the petition as part of the per curiam decision.

Observers of the court believed this decision, while unsigned, firmly asserted the current 5–4 split between conservative and liberal justices and signalled that abortion rights would become a critical issue for the current court, particularly ahead of the 2020 United States elections.
