= Mont v. United States =

- Supreme Court of the United States

Argued February 26, 2019 Decided June 3, 2019
- Full case name: Jason J. Mont v. United States
- Docket no.: 17-8995
- Citations: 587 U.S. ___ (more) 139 S. Ct. 1826; 204 L. Ed. 2d 94

Case history
- Prior: United States v. Mont, 723 F. App'x 325 (6th Cir. 2018) cert. granted, 202 L. Ed. 2d 346 (2018).

Questions presented
- Whether a term of supervised release for one offense is paused by imprisonment for another offense within the meaning of 18 U.S.C. §3624(e).

Holding
- Pretrial detention that is later credited as time served tolls a term of supervised release under 18 U.S.C. §3624(e).

Court membership
- Chief Justice John Roberts Associate Justices Clarence Thomas · Ruth Bader Ginsburg; Stephen Breyer · Samuel Alito; Sonia Sotomayor · Elena Kagan; Neil Gorsuch · Brett Kavanaugh

Case opinions
- Majority: Thomas, joined by Roberts, Ginsburg, Alito, Kavanaugh
- Dissent: Sotomayor, joined by Breyer, Kagan, Gorsuch

Mont v. United States, No. 17-8995, 587 U.S. ___ (2019), is a United States Supreme Court case concerning the proper interpretation of "supervised release" under 18 U.S.C. §3624(e). The case involved a prisoner who was convicted on drug distribution charges and was sentenced to imprisonment and supervised release. While on supervised release, he was charged and pleaded guilty to various state-law offenses, but due to administrative delays, his sentence was not entered until after the day on which his supervised release was to end. He was nonetheless charged with violating the terms of his supervised release, and he sought to challenge the court's jurisdiction to hear the case, arguing that his pretrial detention for the later offenses. The question in the case was whether a term of supervised release for one event can be tolled (paused) by imprisonment for another offense.

The Supreme Court decided that a term of supervised release is paused by imprisonment for another offense in a 5–4 decision that did not conform to typical ideological lines. Justice Thomas authored the majority opinion, in which Chief Justice Roberts and Justices Alito, Kavanaugh, and Ginsburg joined. Justice Sotomayor filed a dissenting opinion joined by Justices Breyer, Kagan, and Gorsuch.

== Factual background ==
Jason Mont pleaded guilty to several drug-related federal offenses in 2005 in the United States District Court for the Northern District of Ohio. He was sentenced to 120 months imprisonment and five years of supervised release to end on March 6, 2017. Mont was later arrested, during his term of supervised release, in June 2016 for state drug offenses. At this point, Mont's probation officer reported Mont's violation of his term of supervised release to the District Court and alerted the District Court that the probation office was tolling his federal term of supervised release because they were not able to supervise him while he was in state custody. Mont later entered into a plea deal where he pleaded guilty to the state charges and a sentencing hearing was set for December 2016. In late October 2016, Mont admitted to the District Court that he had violated the terms of his supervised release, but objected to a supervised-release hearing in November of that same year to allow the state conviction to become final. After several delays, Mont, in late March 2017, was finally sentenced to six years' imprisonment with the ten months in pretrial detention counted as time served, and the District Court scheduled a hearing for June 28, 2017. But before the hearing, Mont objected to the District Court's jurisdiction to hear the case because he claimed his supervised release ended March 6, 2017.

== Legal background ==
Under federal law, a "term of supervised release commences on the day the person is released from imprisonment," and it is paused "during any period in which the person is imprisoned in connection with a conviction for a Federal, State, or local crime . . . ." At issue in this case was whether the term of supervised release could be tolled while the prisoner is in pretrial detention for another offense—put differently, whether pretrial detention counts as "imprison[ment] in connection with a conviction."

=== Procedural posture ===
Mont originally challenged the jurisdiction of the District Court, arguing that his term of supervised release ended March 6, 2017. The District Court retained jurisdiction under 18 U.S.C. §3583(i). A three-judge panel on the United States Court of Appeals for the Sixth Circuit affirmed the decision but on different grounds, holding that under Sixth Circuit precedent Mont's term of supervised release was tolled during the time that he was in pretrial detention for another offense.

At the time the Sixth Circuit decided the case, there was a circuit split about this exact issue. The United States Courts of Appeal for the Fourth, Fifth, Sixth, and Eleventh Circuits all agreed, prior to the Supreme Court granting certiorari, that pretrial detention counts as "imprison[ment] in connection with a conviction" under 18 U.S.C. §3583(i) while the Ninth and D.C. Circuits disagreed. The Supreme Court granted certiorari to resolve the question.

=== Arguments ===
Mont, the defendant in this case, argued that the term of supervised release should not be paused during pretrial detention because pretrial detention is not "imprison[ment] in connection with a conviction . . . ." Specifically, Mont argued that pretrial detentions are only in connection with a conviction when the defendant is found to be guilty, thus imposing a retroactive definition not contemplated in the statute nor its history. In response, the United States argued that any other reading would not comport with the plain text of the statute and tolling terms of supervised release during pretrial detention better serves the "supervised-release scheme" because supervised release is meant to help people reintegrate into society—something not possible when that person is in detention.

== Supreme Court ==
=== Majority ===
In a majority opinion by Justice Thomas, the Court ruled in favor of the United States, holding that terms of supervised release are tolled while a person is in pretrial detention in accordance with 18 U.S.C. §3624(e). The Court employed a firm textualist approach to the statute, stating that the dictionary definition of "imprisonment" clearly includes pretrial detention. Further, the Court reasoned that because pretrial detention is often counted as time served once someone is convicted, it clearly is in "connection with a conviction." The Court went on to reason the statute juxtaposes supervised release and probation with imprisonment, clearly distinguishing the two different sentences and "it would be an exceedingly odd construction of the statute to give a defendant the windfall of satisfying a new sentence of imprisonment and an old sentence of supervised release with the same period of pretrial detention." The Court agreed with the United States that the purpose of supervised release would be frustrated by a reading that allowed a term to continue concurrently with pretrial detention, therefore holding that tolling is appropriate and affirming the decision of the Sixth Circuit.

=== Dissent ===
Justice Sotomayor authored the dissent, joined by three other justices, and relied heavily on the statute's present-tense construction. She emphasized that a plain reading of the statute did not allow pretrial detention to be read as "imprison[ment] in connection with a conviction" because at the time of pretrial detention no conviction exists. It's only upon retroactive application, she argued, that pretrial detention can be said to be in connection with a conviction, yet the way the statute is written precludes that conclusion.

== See also ==
- List of United States Supreme Court cases, volume 587
