= Smith v. Berryhill =

- Supreme Court of the United States

Decided May 28, 2019
- Full case name: Smith v. Berryhill
- Docket no.: 17-1606
- Citations: 587 U.S. ___ (more)

Holding
- A Social Security Administration Appeals Council dismissal on timeliness grounds after a claimant has had an ALJ hearing on the merits is a final decision subject to judicial review.

Court membership
- Chief Justice John Roberts Associate Justices Clarence Thomas · Ruth Bader Ginsburg; Stephen Breyer · Samuel Alito; Sonia Sotomayor · Elena Kagan; Neil Gorsuch · Brett Kavanaugh

Case opinion
- Majority: Sotomayor, joined by unanimous

Laws applied
- 42 U.S.C. § 405(g)

Smith v. Berryhill, 587 U.S. ___ (2019), was a United States Supreme Court case in which the court held that a Social Security Administration Appeals Council dismissal on timeliness grounds after a claimant has had an administrative law judge hearing on the merits is a final decision subject to judicial review.

== Background ==
The Social Security Act permits judicial review of "any final decision...after a hearing" by the Social Security Administration (SSA). Claimants for supplemental security income disability benefits under Title XVI of the Act must generally proceed through a four-step administrative process in order to obtain federal-court review: (1) seek an initial determination of eligibility; (2) seek reconsideration of that determination; (3) request a hearing before an administrative law judge (ALJ); and (4) seek review of the ALJ’s decision by the SSA's Appeals Council. A request for Appeals Council review generally must be made within 60 days of receiving the ALJ’s ruling; if the claimant misses the deadline and cannot show good cause for doing so, the Appeals Council dismisses the request.

Petitioner Ricky Lee Smith’s claim for disability benefits under Title XVI was denied at the initial-determination stage, upon reconsideration, and on the merits after a hearing before an ALJ. The Appeals Council later dismissed Smith’s request for review as untimely. Smith sought judicial review of the dismissal in a federal district court, which held that it lacked jurisdiction to hear the suit. The Sixth Circuit affirmed, maintaining that the Appeals Council’s dismissal of an untimely petition is not a "final decision" subject to federal-court review.
