= Illinois Brick Co. v. Illinois =

- Supreme Court of the United States

Argued March 23, 1977 Decided June 9, 1977
- Full case name: Illinois Brick Co. et al. v. Illinois et al.
- Docket no.: 76-404
- Citations: 431 U.S. 720 (more) 97 S. Ct. 2061; 52 L. Ed. 2d 707

Holding
- Only direct customers of products or services can seek antitrust remedies against the product manufacturers or service offerors.

Court membership
- Chief Justice Warren E. Burger Associate Justices William J. Brennan Jr. · Potter Stewart; Byron White · Thurgood Marshall; Harry Blackmun · Lewis F. Powell Jr. William Rehnquist · John P. Stevens

Case opinions
- Majority: White, joined by Burger, Stewart, Powell, Rehnquist, Stevens
- Dissent: Brennan, joined by Marshall, Blackmun
- Dissent: Blackmun

Illinois Brick Co. v. Illinois, 431 U.S. 720 (1977) is a United States Supreme Court case that involved issues concerning statutory standing in antitrust law.

The decision established the rule that indirect purchasers of goods or services along a supply chain cannot seek damages for antitrust violations committed by the original manufacturer or service provider, but it permitted such claims by direct purchasers. Several courts recognize exceptions to the rule.

The decision has become known as the "Illinois Brick doctrine" and is applied to determine whether a plaintiff has standing to bring claims under various federal antitrust statutes.

== Background ==
In the early 1970s, the United States government filed both civil and criminal charges against eleven concrete block manufacturers in Chicago, stating that they were engaging in price fixing. The defendants pleaded nolo contendere and entered into a settlement with the government.

Spurred by this, the government of Illinois filed a new suit at the eleven concrete block manufacturers, asserting they were engaged in conspiratorial price-fixing for concrete blocks to be used for government construction, violating the Sherman Antitrust Act, and seeking treble damage. The defendants sought to have the case dismissed as the government were not direct purchasers of the blocks. In general, these companies sold blocks directly to masonry contractors for them to complete jobs given to them by general contractors during the construction of new buildings; the defendants stated that the government, in paying for the construction of these buildings, were not the ones purchasing the blocks themselves. The district court agreed, citing both the Supreme Court ruling of Hanover Shoe, Inc. v. United Shoe Machinery Corp. that emphasized that direct purchasers of goods have the right to sue manufacturers for antitrust, and the Seventh Circuit's decision in Commonwealth Edison v. Allis-Chalmers Mfg. Co. that determined that the ultimate consumers of goods along a supply chain were "too remote and [in]consequential to provide legal standing to sue against the alleged antitrust violator".

The state appealed to the Seventh Circuit, which overturned the district court's ruling, arguing that the Sherman Act allows for any person that was harmed by antitrust behaviors to bring suit for triple damages. The block manufacturers petitioned to the Supreme Court for writ of certiorari, which was granted. Oral arguments were heard on March 23, 1977 with the decision given on June 9, 1977.

== Judgment ==
In a 6—3 decision, the Supreme Court held that indirect victims of a price fixing conspiracy had no standing to sue for antitrust violations for raised prices. The majority opinion was written by Justice Byron White, joined by Justices Warren Burger, Potter Stewart, Lewis Powell, William Rehnquist, and John Paul Stevens. It held that if an indirect purchaser of overpriced goods could sue, then it would open the door to “multiple recovery”. An overcharge might be collected if more than one entity in the chain of distribution of the product could recover for the same violation. White was concerned with the Court making a significant overrule to their previous decision in Hanover Shoe.

Justice William Brennan wrote a dissenting opinion, joined by Justices Thurgood Marshall and Harry Blackmun. Brennan wrote that the majority's approach to stay consistent with Hanover Shoe undercut the strength of the language that Congress had written into the Sherman Act. Justice Blackmun also wrote a dissenting opinion, arguing the case's close timing with Hanover likely impacted the result; if Hanover had not been decided, the courts would have likely ruled in favor of the state government.

== Exceptions ==
Two exceptions to the direct purchaser rule are potentially recognized in various jurisdictions: the control exception and the preexisting cost-plus contract exception.

The control exception, noted in footnote 16 of the Illinois Brick opinion, states that in some situations an indirect purchaser might maintain an antitrust action where the direct purchases is owned or controlled by its customer. This exception is narrowly construed and limited to situations where the relationship involves a functional or economic unity between the direct and indirect purchaser such that there has been effectively one sale.

The preexisting cost-plus contract exception states that an indirect purchaser may have standing where the costs initially borne by the direct purchaser are passed on to the indirect purchaser pursuant to a preexisting cost-plus contract between the parties. In such situation, the overcharging is not absorbed by the direct purchaser but is instead passed on to the indirect purchaser.

== Significance ==
The Supreme Court ruled in Kansas v. UtiliCorp United (1990) that Illinois Brick required the dismissal of parens patriae claims brought by states.

Many state antitrust laws reject the Illinois Brick doctrine. Thus, in California v. ARC America Corp., the Supreme Court rejected arguments that Illinois Brick preempted broader state antitrust laws such as that of California, which rejected the doctrine.

A 2007 Antitrust Modernization Commission Report proposed that Congress should abandon the Illinois Brick doctrine. The proposal, if adopted, would weaken the federal right of action for direct purchasers by reviving as a defense the fact that the direct purchaser had passed on the overcharge instead of absorbing it, while creating a federal right of action for indirect purchasers. Federal rights of action under the proposal would not be exclusive, but state law claims would be subject to expanded federal jurisdiction to allow consolidation of all claims from a price fix in a single court for both discovery and trial. All recoveries in the consolidated actions would be limited to the initial overcharge, trebled.

The applicability of Illinois Brick towards digital marketplaces was the subject of the Supreme Court case, Apple Inc. v. Pepper heard in the 2018-2019 which relates to whether consumers of third-party mobile applications through a marketplace can bring antitrust actions against the owner of the marketplace. The Court determined that consumers that purchased apps through Apple's iOS app store were direct purchasers and had standing to sue Apple for antitrust actions, despite Apple's insistence that consumers were buying apps from developers.

== See also ==
- US antitrust law
