= Manhattan Community Access Corp. v. Halleck =

- Supreme Court of the United States

Argued February 25, 2019 Decided June 17, 2019
- Full case name: Manhattan Community Access Corp. v. Halleck
- Docket no.: 17-1702
- Citations: 587 U.S. (more) 139 S. Ct. 1921; 204 L. Ed. 2d 405

Case history
- Prior: Motion to dismiss granted, Halleck v. City of New York, 224 F. Supp. 3d 238 (S.D.N.Y. 2016); reversed in part, Halleck v. Manhattan Cmty. Access Corp., 882 F.3d 300 (2d Cir. 2018); cert. granted, 139 S. Ct. 360 (2018).

Court membership
- Chief Justice John Roberts Associate Justices Clarence Thomas · Ruth Bader Ginsburg; Stephen Breyer · Samuel Alito; Sonia Sotomayor · Elena Kagan; Neil Gorsuch · Brett Kavanaugh

Case opinions
- Majority: Kavanaugh, joined by Roberts, Thomas, Alito, Gorsuch
- Dissent: Sotomayor, joined by Ginsburg, Breyer, Kagan

Manhattan Community Access Corp. v. Halleck, No. 17-1702, 587 U.S. ___ (2019), was a United States Supreme Court case related to limitations on First Amendment-based free speech placed by private operators. The Court held that a public access station was not considered a state actor for purposes of evaluating free speech issues in a 5–4 ruling split along ideological lines. Prior to the Court's decision, analysts believed that the case had the potential to determine whether limitations on free speech on social media violate First Amendment rights. However, the Court's narrow holding avoided that issue.

== Background ==
=== Alleged violation ===
In the past, the Supreme Court has not directly ruled that public access television systems, which operate on leased channels provided by the government, are not considered public forums, as established by a split ruling in Denver Area Educ. Telecomms. Consortium, Inc. v. F.C.C. In the 1970s, the Federal Communications Commission (FCC) mandated that cable operators leave some channels for public use. However, in 1979, the Supreme Court case Federal Communications Commission v. Midwest Video Corporation ruled that the FCC did not have the authority to institute this order. In 1984, President Reagan signed the Cable Communications Policy allowing state governments to require cable operators to devote some channels for public access. Such television systems have generally been upheld as being private operators rather than a state actor, giving them the ability to limit free speech.

Manhattan Neighborhood Network (MNN) is a public access television network run by Manhattan Community Access Corp. that serves New York City. In 2012, DeeDee Halleck and Jesus Papoleto Melendez, employees of MNN at the time, went to a MNN Board meeting but were told the meeting was private. Halleck and Melendez then produced a program entitled The 1% Visit El Barrio that was critical of MNN. While their program was only aired once, further airings were cancelled and the two were denied further access to MNN's premises and channel. (Note: Halleck was banned for a year while Melendez was banned for life.)

=== Procedural history ===
Halleck and Melendez filed suit against MNN and the city, claiming that MNN was a public forum which had violated their First Amendment rights to free speech. In December 2016, The United States District Court for the Southern District of New York dismissed the case, following arguments from the city and MNN, and following the Supreme Court's own decision from Denver Area that declined to settle whether public access systems were considered state actors. The District Court found, "In short, there is no clear precedent governing whether public access channels are public forum. The issue is certainly a close call."

On appeal to the Second Circuit, two of the three judges ruled for Halleck and Melendez, citing Justice Anthony Kennedy's dissent in Denver Area which suggested that public access systems, which were mandated by the government, should be treated as state actors, and therefore could not regulate free speech. The Second Circuit did not find the City to be at fault.

MNN petitioned for writ of certiorari in June 2018, which the Supreme Court granted in October 2018. It was the first case accepted by the Court following the induction of Justice Brett Kavanaugh, replacing Kennedy on the bench.

=== Speculation ===
While the case was directly about public access television, several analysts believed the Court would also review how companies that control social media on the Internet would be treated under similar considerations. This was predicated on the Court's prior decision in Packingham v. North Carolina, where the Court held that social media was a "protected space" for lawful speech under the First Amendment. Ultimately, the decision was more limited, ruling on the status of MNN rather than whether the actions directly affect free speech; thus the case was not expected to have a major impact on social media.

== Holding ==
On February 25, 2019, the Supreme Court heard oral arguments. The Justices' questions centered around whether the city had a property interest in MNN's channel space and what precisely New York's "first come, first serve" rule meant practically. The Court delivered its 5–4 decision along ideological lines on June 17, 2019, which reversed the Second Circuit's decision and remanded the case to be reheard on its ruling.

=== Opinion of the Court ===
Justice Kavanaugh wrote the majority opinion, finding that MNN could not be considered a state actor in how it operates, and as such, was not bound to protect free speech rights as a state actor would be expected. The Court stated that the MNN is immune to the First and Fourteenth amendments due to its status as a private company. The opinion based its holding on the fact that First and Fourteenth Amendments only apply to “governmental abridgment of speech” and not to “private abridgment of speech”. In order for an organization to be seen as governmental, private companies must be a state actor, meaning an organization that exercises “powers traditionally exclusive to the state”, defined from the case Jackson v. Metropolitan Edison Co. and the action must have been originally and solely performed by the government (Rendell-Baker v. Kohn, Evans v. Newton). In conclusion, the opinion states that even though the local government of New York City did give a contract for the MNN to operate these public access channels, since they have been operated by private cable companies from earlier times, the action of operating a public access channel does not meet the criteria of the function being originally and solely performed by the government.

The opinion compares the facts of the case to prior court precedent such as Columbia Broadcasting System, Inc. v. Democratic National Committee, Moose Lodge No. 107 v. Irvis, and Trustees of Dartmouth College v. Woodward for broadcast licenses, liquor licenses, and corporate charters respectively. The opinion also stated that even if a private organization creates a public forum for speech, the fact that it is a private company means the First Amendment is not applicable. An example the opinion gives is that private organizations such as grocery stores and comedy clubs allow public forums such as bulletin boards or open mic sessions, but only topics that are relevant to these organizations are allowed to be expressed.

Halleck did not address the constitutionality of New York's regulation of public access television. However, an appended footnote in the opinion indicated that some members of the Court had an interest in deciding "whether legislatures can constitutionally require cable operators to cede editorial control of the content of some of their channels in an effort to promote a more robust and inclusive public sphere."

=== Dissenting opinion ===
The dissenting opinion, written by Justice Sonia Sotomayor believed that MNN “stepped into the City's shoes and thus qualifies as a state actor, subject to the First Amendment like any other." Justice Sotomayor also argues that since New York City laws require that public-access channels be open to all, MNN also took responsibility for this law with the public-access channels. It did not matter whether the City or a private company runs this public forum since the City mandated that the channels be open to all.
