= Sturgeon v. Frost =

Sturgeon v. Frost I
- Supreme Court of the United States

Argued January 20, 2016 Decided March 22, 2016
- Full case name: Sturgeon v. Frost, Alaska Regional Director of the National Park Service, et al.
- Docket no.: 14-1209
- Citations: 577 U.S. ___ (more) 136 S. Ct. 1061; 194 L. Ed. 2d 108
- Opinion announcement: Opinion announcement

Case history
- Prior: Summary judgment granted, Sturgeon v. Masica, No. 3:11-cv-0183, 2013 WL 5888230 (D. Alaska Oct. 30, 2013); affirmed, 768 F.3d 1066 (9th Cir. 2014); cert. granted, 136 S. Ct. 27 (2015).
- Subsequent: On remand, 872 F.3d 927 (9th Cir. 2017); cert. granted, 138 S. Ct. 2648 (2018).

Court membership
- Chief Justice John Roberts Associate Justices Anthony Kennedy · Clarence Thomas; Ruth Bader Ginsburg · Stephen Breyer; Samuel Alito · Sonia Sotomayor; Elena Kagan

Case opinion
- Majority: Roberts, joined by unanimous

Laws applied
- Alaska National Interest Lands Conservation Act, 16 U.S.C. § 3103(c)

Sturgeon v. Frost II
- Supreme Court of the United States

Argued November 5, 2018 Decided March 26, 2019
- Full case name: Sturgeon v. Frost, Alaska Regional Director of the National Park Service, et al.
- Docket no.: 17-949
- Citations: 587 U.S. ___ (more) 139 S. Ct. 1066; 203 L. Ed. 2d 453
- Opinion announcement: Opinion announcement

Case history
- Prior: 872 F.3d 927 (9th Cir. 2017); cert. granted, 138 S. Ct. 2648 (2018).

Court membership
- Chief Justice John Roberts Associate Justices Clarence Thomas · Ruth Bader Ginsburg; Stephen Breyer · Samuel Alito; Sonia Sotomayor · Elena Kagan; Neil Gorsuch · Brett Kavanaugh

Case opinion
- Majority: Kagan, joined by unanimous

Laws applied
- Alaska National Interest Lands Conservation Act, 16 U.S.C. § 3103(c)

Sturgeon v. Frost refers to two cases heard by the Supreme Court of the United States, both of which deal with the regulatory authority of the National Park Service over lands in Alaska under the Alaska National Interest Lands Conservation Act (ANILCA). In the first case, Sturgeon v. Frost I, 577 U.S. ___ (2016), the Court ruled that the National Park Service may regulate only "public" lands in Alaska and remanded the case to the Ninth Circuit Appeals Court to decide whether the river in question, which is "submerged land," is "public" or "non-public" land. In Sturgeon v. Frost II, 587 U.S. ___ (2019), the Court unanimously ruled that the ANILCA defines navigable waters in Alaska as "non-public" lands and that they are exempt from the National Park Service's national regulations.

== Background ==
In establishing Alaska as a state, the US government recognized the need to protect much of the land in the state but without superseding the state's own control of these lands. The Alaska National Interest Lands Conservation Act, passed in 1980, was designed to balance the federal and the state interests in conservation. Effectively, the law designed a number of Conservation System Units (CSUs), which were designed as public land, and gave the National Park Service (NPS) the authority to manage the resources within the United States public lands within a CSU and could not regulate non-public lands (including those owned by the state, tribes, and private parties). Such resources were read to include water resources within a public CSU. That was added to a law signed by President Jimmy Carter in 1976 that gave the Department of the Interior and, through the NPS, the authority to regulate conduct of navigable waters within federally-designated national parks.

The case arose in 2007 when the Alaskan hunter John Sturgeon was informed by the National Park Service that he could not pilot his hovercraft along the portion of the Nation River that fell within the Yukon–Charley Rivers National Preserve, one of the CSUs covered by ANILCA. Alaska state law allows for the use of hovercraft in navigable waters, but the NPS had banned their use nationwide in public lands.

Sturgeon filed a lawsuit in which he argued that section 103(c) of the ANILCA restricted the National Park Service's jurisdiction over portions of the river that were owned by Alaska. Sturgeon was backed by the state since the ruling affected how the state could enforce ANILCA. The United States District Court for the District of Alaska ruled in favor of the Park Service, and the United States Court of Appeals for the Ninth Circuit affirmed. The Ninth Circuit held that National Park Service regulations "applies to all federal-owned lands and waters administered by [the Park Service] nationwide, as well as all navigable waters lying within national parks," which allowed the NPS to regulate activities along the whole of the navigable portion of the Nation River even if it fell outside the CSU.

== Sturgeon v. Frost I ==
In a unanimous opinion written by Chief Justice John Roberts, the Supreme Court reversed the Ninth Circuit's ruling. Roberts characterized the Ninth Circuit's ruling as "a topsy-turvy approach" because the Ninth Circuit's interpretation of the Alaska National Interest Lands Conservation Act had been "ultimately inconsistent with both the text and context of the statute as a whole." Rejecting the Ninth Circuit's conclusions, Roberts held that the Act directs the Park Service to regulate "non-public" lands in Alaska according to "Alaska-specific provisions." Additionally, he wrote that "Section 103(c) draws a distinction between 'public' and 'non-public' lands within the boundaries of conservation system units in Alaska."

However, the Supreme Court did not rule on whether the Nation River constituted a "public land" for the purposes of the Act or whether the authority of the Park Service's regulations extend to "non-public" lands. To conduct further fact-finding with respect to those issues, the Supreme Court vacated the Ninth Circuit's ruling and remanded the case for further proceedings.

In his analysis of the case for SCOTUSblog, Todd Henderson suggested that the Supreme Court avoided several key questions because "the stakes in this case are potentially huge" and that it wanted to "leave for another day the tough questions about federal power over lands in Alaska and perhaps elsewhere throughout the West."

== Sturgeon v. Frost II ==
The Supreme Court remanded the case to the Ninth Circuit for further review. In the second hearing, the Circuit Court determined since the Nation River runs through a federal reservation, the federal government had inherent water rights on the river, which allowed the National Park Service's hovercraft ban to apply. A second petition for writ was filed with the Supreme Court that arguing that interpretation would mean that the federal government to have water rights on nearly any surface water running through federally-protected lands.

The case was heard on November 5, 2018, and the Court issued its unanimous decision on March 26, 2019 that reversed the Circuit Court's ruling by arguing that waterways were non-public lands and that the ANILCA had stripped away any jurisdiction that the National Park Service had over them.

== See also ==
- List of United States Supreme Court cases
- Lists of United States Supreme Court cases by volume
- List of United States Supreme Court cases by the Roberts Court
