= Thacker v. TVA =

Thacker v. Tennessee Valley Authority
- Supreme Court of the United States

Decided April 29, 2019
- Full case name: Thacker v. TVA
- Docket no.: 17-1201
- Citations: 587 U.S. ___ (more)

Holding
- The waiver of immunity in the TVA's sue-and-be-sued clause is not subject to a discretionary function exception of the kind in the Federal Tort Claims Act.

Court membership
- Chief Justice John Roberts Associate Justices Clarence Thomas · Ruth Bader Ginsburg; Stephen Breyer · Samuel Alito; Sonia Sotomayor · Elena Kagan; Neil Gorsuch · Brett Kavanaugh

Case opinion
- Majority: Kagan, joined by unanimous

Thacker v. Tennessee Valley Authority, 587 U.S. ___ (2019), was a United States Supreme Court case in which the court held that the waiver of immunity in the Tennessee Valley Authority (TVA)'s sue-and-be-sued clause is not subject to a discretionary function exception of the kind in the Federal Tort Claims Act.

== Background ==
The Tennessee Valley Authority (TVA), a government-owned corporation, provides electric power to millions of Americans. In creating the TVA, Congress decided that the corporation could "sue and be sued in its corporate name," thus waiving at least some of the sovereign immunity from suit that it would have enjoyed as a federal government entity. Congress subsequently waived immunity from tort suits involving agencies across the government in the Federal Tort Claims Act (FTCA), but it carved out an exception for claims based on a federal employee’s performance of a "discretionary function." Congress specifically excluded from the FTCA's provisions—including the discretionary function exception—"[a]ny claim arising from the activities of the [TVA]."

In this case, TVA employees were raising a downed power line that was partially submerged in the Tennessee River when Gary Thacker drove his boat into the area at high speed. Thacker's boat collided with the power line, seriously injuring him and killing his passenger. He sued for negligence. The TVA moved to dismiss, claiming sovereign immunity, and the district court granted the motion. Affirming, the Eleventh Circuit Court of Appeals used the same test it applies when evaluating whether the government is immune from suit under the discretionary function exception to the FTCA, and it held that Thacker's suit was foreclosed because the challenged actions were "a matter of choice."
