= Quarles v. United States =

- Supreme Court of the United States

Decided June 10, 2019
- Full case name: Quarles v. United States
- Docket no.: 17-778
- Citations: 587 U.S. ___ (more)

Holding
- When deciding whether a state law is broader than a crime within the scope of the Armed Career Criminals Act, the state law’s "exact definition or label" does not control. So long as the state law in question substantially corresponds to (or is narrower than) that crime, the conviction qualifies.

Court membership
- Chief Justice John Roberts Associate Justices Clarence Thomas · Ruth Bader Ginsburg; Stephen Breyer · Samuel Alito; Sonia Sotomayor · Elena Kagan; Neil Gorsuch · Brett Kavanaugh

Case opinions
- Majority: Kavanaugh, joined by unanimous
- Concurrence: Thomas

Laws applied
- Armed Career Criminals Act

Quarles v. United States, 587 U.S. ___ (2019), was a United States Supreme Court case in which the court held that, when deciding whether a state law is broader than a crime within the scope of the Armed Career Criminals Act, the state law’s "exact definition or label" does not control. So long as the state law in question substantially corresponds to (or is narrower than) that crime, the conviction qualifies.

== Background ==
When Jamar Quarles pled guilty to being a felon in possession of a firearm, he also appeared to qualify for enhanced sentencing under the Armed Career Criminal Act (ACCA) because he had at least three prior "violent felony" convictions. He claimed, however, that a 2002 Michigan conviction for third-degree home invasion did not qualify, even though the ACCA defines "violent felony" to include "burglary," and the generic statutory term "burglary" means "unlawful or unprivileged entry into, or remaining in, a building or structure, with intent to commit a crime." Quarles argued that Michigan’s third-degree home invasion statute—which applies when a person "breaks and enters a dwelling or enters a dwelling without permission and, at any time while he or she is entering, present in, or exiting the dwelling, commits a misdemeanor"—swept too broadly. Specifically, he claimed, it encompassed situations where the defendant forms the intent to commit a crime at any time while unlawfully remaining in a dwelling, while generic remaining-in burglary occurs only when the defendant has the intent to commit a crime at the exact moment when he or she first unlawfully remains in a building or structure. The district court rejected that argument, and the Sixth Circuit affirmed.
