= Apple Inc. v. Pepper =

- Supreme Court of the United States

Argued November 26, 2018 Decided May 13, 2019
- Full case name: Apple Inc. v. Pepper, et al.
- Docket no.: 17-204
- Citations: 587 U.S. ___ (more) 139 S. Ct. 1514; 203 L. Ed. 2d 802
- Argument: Oral argument

Case history
- Prior: Motion to dismiss granted, In re Apple iPhone Antitrust Litig., No. 11-cv-06714-YGR (N.D. Cal. Dec. 2, 2013); reversed, In re Apple iPhone Antitrust Litig. (Pepper v. Apple Inc.), 846 F.3d 313 (9th Cir. 2017); cert. granted, 138 S. Ct. 2647 (2018).

Holding
- Under Illinois Brick, the iPhone owners were direct purchasers who may sue Apple for alleged monopolization.

Court membership
- Chief Justice John Roberts Associate Justices Clarence Thomas · Ruth Bader Ginsburg; Stephen Breyer · Samuel Alito; Sonia Sotomayor · Elena Kagan; Neil Gorsuch · Brett Kavanaugh

Case opinions
- Majority: Kavanaugh, joined by Ginsburg, Breyer, Sotomayor, Kagan
- Dissent: Gorsuch, joined by Roberts, Thomas, Alito

Laws applied
- Clayton Act

Apple Inc. v. Pepper, 587 U.S. ___ (2019) was a United States Supreme Court case related to antitrust laws related to third-party resellers. The case centers on Apple's App Store, and whether consumers of apps offered through the store have Article III standing under federal antitrust laws to bring a class-action antitrust lawsuit against Apple for practices it uses to regulate the App Store. The case centers on the applicability of the "Illinois Brick doctrine" established by the Supreme Court in 1977 via Illinois Brick Co. v. Illinois, which determined that indirect consumers of products lack Article III standing to bring antitrust charges against producers of those products. In its 5–4 decision, the Supreme Court ruled that since consumers purchased apps directly through Apple, that they have standing under Illinois Brick to seek antitrust charges against Apple.

== Background ==
With the introduction of the iPhone in 2007, Apple also provided the App Store marketplace that allows third-party developers to provide mobile apps to iPhone users. Apps can be provided for free or at a price, with Apple taking a 30% cut of any revenue generated by the sale of digital products. Apple's approach has been criticized, as its terms and conditions for developers to use the App Store prevent them from selling their apps on other marketplaces, and Apple's consumer warranties strongly discourage the use of installing apps in other ways. (Note: In contrast, while Google also collects fees on purchases of apps from Google Play store for Android devices, it neither holds a monopoly on phones, nor prevents apps to be sideloaded from other app stores or sources.) Some saw these conditions enabling Apple to effectively create a monopoly for app distribution, artificially forcing developers to raise costs of apps to cover Apple's fee. Apple has asserted that it has not violated antitrust laws as it considers itself a reseller of apps, its 30% fee a commission on the sale of those apps.

=== Case origins ===
Several class-actions suits against Apple were filed shortly after the introduction of the iPhone; three of these were combined into a consolidated case In Re Apple & AT&TM Anti-Trust Litigation (No. C 07-05152 JW), filed in the United States District Court for the Northern District of California. One of these focused on complaints towards Apple for violating the Sherman Antitrust Act in its alleged monopoly of the App Store marketplace, while a second set of complaints was aimed at both Apple and AT&T Mobility (AT&TM) for monopolizing the iPhone market via SIM card locking, forcing iPhone users to only use the AT&T Mobility cellular network. Apple sought to dismiss the case on various procedural grounds, including asserting that on consolidation, AT&T Mobility had been omitted as a defendant, and that as the class-action group, consumers using the iPhone, did not state they bought an iPhone or any App through the App Store, and thus did not have grounds to litigate under Article III of the Constitution. Following the Supreme Court's ruling in AT&T Mobility LLC v. Concepcion, 563 U.S. 333 (2011), which stated that state laws cannot override arbitration allowances set by the Federal Arbitration Act, the District Court de-certified the case from its class-action status.

=== Renewed case ===
A new class-action suit, In Re Apple iPhone Antitrust Litigation (11-cv-06714-YGR) was filed shortly after the decertification by the same plaintiffs in District Court; the new complaint, after several refinements, narrowly focused only on Apple as the sole defendant and the App Store complaints, and identified the plaintiffs as consumers of the iPhone and its apps, thus allowing for them to seek class-action. The District Court dismissed the suit with prejudice, upholding Apple's defense that the "Illinois Brick doctrine" from the Supreme Court case Illinois Brick Co. v. Illinois, 431 U.S. 720 (1977) applied, as only the developers of apps could be damaged by Apple's policies, and consumers did not have statutory standing to bring suit on the developers' behalf. The Court specifically noted that the 30% fee Apple collects is "a cost passed-on to consumers by independent software developers".

=== Appeal ===
The class appealed to the United States Court of Appeals for the Ninth Circuit. The Ninth Circuit reversed the District Court's ruling, stating that the class had standing to sue under antitrust laws. The decision raised the question of "whether Plaintiffs purchased their iPhone apps directly from the app developers, or directly from Apple". The ruling opened the question of whether, in terms of the App Store, Apple was a manufacturer or producer, in which case under Illinois Brick the class would not have standing, or whether Apple was a distributor, in which case the class would have standing. This decision was split from the Eighth Circuit, where in a class-action suit against Ticketmaster alleging antitrust complaints on venue tickets sales, the Eighth Circuit ruled that consumers were indirect purchasers under Illinois Brick due to the nature of ticket sales, and thus did not have standing. Apple attempted to seek a rehearing en banc but were denied by May 2017.

== Hearing ==
Apple filed a petition for writ of certiorari to the Supreme Court in August 2017, posing the question "whether consumers may sue anyone who delivers goods to them for antitrust damages, even when they seek damages based on prices set by third parties who would be the immediate victims of the alleged offense". The US Government filed an amicus brief in support of Apple, arguing that the Ninth Circuit in reversing the District Court's ruling, went against the precedent established by the Supreme Court in Illinois Brick. The Court agreed to hear the case in June 2018. Oral arguments were held on November 26. Court observers stated that the four liberal Justices were joined by three of the conservative ones, Justices Alito, Gorsuch, and Kavanaugh, as to side with consumers on the question of standing. Justice Sonia Sotomayor stated that Apple's practice creates a closed loop that impacts the price paid by consumers. Justice Neil Gorsuch considered that the prior decision from Illinois Brick may need to be overturned at the federal level, as at least 30 states have rejected the Illinois Brick doctrine.

== Decision ==
The Court issued its 5–4 decision on May 13, 2019, affirming the Ninth Circuit's decision that consumers were "direct purchasers" of apps from Apple's store and had standing under Illinois Brick to sue Apple for antitrust practices. Justice Brett Kavanaugh, writing for the majority, stated that under the test of Illinois Brick, consumers were directly affected by Apple's fee and were not secondary purchasers; that consumers could sue Apple directly since it was Apple's fee that affected the prices of the apps; and that while the structure for any damages that consumers may win in the continuing suit may be complicated, that is not a factor to determine the standing of the suit. The Court stated that Apple's interpretation of Illinois Brick "did not make a lot of sense" and served only to "gerrymander Apple out of this and similar lawsuits." Disagreeing with Apple's reasoning, the Court explained that if adopted, it would "directly contradict the longstanding goal of effective private enforcement and consumer protection in antitrust cases." Kavanaugh was joined by Justices Ginsburg, Breyer, Sotomayor, and Kagan. The decision remanded the class-action case to continue in lower courts but did not rule on any of the antitrust factors otherwise at the center of the case.

=== Dissenting opinion ===
Justice Neil Gorsuch wrote the dissenting opinion, joined by Chief Justice Roberts and Justices Thomas and Alito, arguing that the majority's interpretation of Illinois Brick goes against previous principles and long-standing antitrust regulations.
