= Cochise Consultancy, Inc. v. United States ex rel. Hunt =

- Supreme Court of the United States

Decided May 13, 2019
- Full case name: Cochise Consultancy, Inc. v. United States ex rel. Hunt
- Docket no.: 18-315
- Citations: 587 U.S. ___ (more)

Holding
- The limitations period for qui tam lawsuits does not change when the Government intervenes in the lawsuit.

Court membership
- Chief Justice John Roberts Associate Justices Clarence Thomas · Ruth Bader Ginsburg; Stephen Breyer · Samuel Alito; Sonia Sotomayor · Elena Kagan; Neil Gorsuch · Brett Kavanaugh

Case opinion
- Majority: Thomas, joined by unanimous

Laws applied
- False Claims Act

Cochise Consultancy, Inc. v. United States ex rel. Hunt, 587 U.S. ___ (2019), was a United States Supreme Court case in which the court held that the limitations period for qui tam lawsuits does not change when the Government intervenes in the lawsuit.

== Background ==
The False Claims Act permits a private person, known as a relator, to bring a qui tam civil action "in the name of the [Federal] Government" against "any person" who "knowingly presents... a false or fraudulent claim for payment" to the Government or to certain third-parties acting on the Government's behalf. The Government may choose to intervene in the action. Two limitations periods apply to this sort of False Claims Act action. An action must be brought within either 6 years after the statutory violation occurred, §3731(b)(1), or 3 years after "the official of the United States charged with responsibility to act in the circumstances" knew or should have known the relevant facts, but not more than 10 years after the violation. The period providing the later date serves as the limitations period, §3731(b)(2).

In November 2013, Billy Joe Hunt filed a complaint alleging that Cochise Consultancy, Inc.—two defense contractors—defrauded the Government by submitting false payment claims for providing security services in Iraq up until early 2007. Hunt claimed that he revealed Cochise's allegedly fraudulent scheme during a November 30, 2010, interview with federal officials about his role in an unrelated contracting fraud in Iraq. The United States declined to intervene in the action, and Cochise moved to dismiss the complaint as barred by the statute of limitations. Hunt countered that his complaint was timely under §3731(b)(2). In dismissing the action, the district court considered three potential interpretations: that §3731(b)(2) did not apply to a relator-initiated action in which the Government elected not to intervene; that §3731(b)(2) applied in nonintervened actions, and the limitations period began when the relator knew or should have known the relevant facts; or that §3731(b)(2) applied in nonintervened actions, and the limitations period begins when the Government official responsible for acting knew or should have known the relevant facts. The court rejected the third interpretation and found that Hunt's complaint would be untimely under either of the first two. The Eleventh Circuit reversed and remanded, adopting the third interpretation.
