= Home Depot U.S.A., Inc. v. Jackson =

- Supreme Court of the United States

Argued January 15, 2019 Decided May 28, 2019
- Full case name: Home Depot U.S.A., Incorporated, Petitioner v. George W. Jackson
- Docket no.: 17-1471
- Citations: 587 U.S. ___ (more) 139 S. Ct. 1743
- Argument: Oral argument
- Decision: Opinion

Holding
- Federal law does not authorize the removal of a case to federal court by a third-party counterclaim defendant, even where the counterclaim is a class action.

Court membership
- Chief Justice John Roberts Associate Justices Clarence Thomas · Ruth Bader Ginsburg; Stephen Breyer · Samuel Alito; Sonia Sotomayor · Elena Kagan; Neil Gorsuch · Brett Kavanaugh

Case opinions
- Majority: Thomas, joined by Ginsburg, Breyer, Sotomayor, Kagan
- Dissent: Alito, joined by Roberts, Gorsuch, Kavanaugh

Laws applied
- 28 U.S.C. §1441, Class Action Fairness Act of 2005

Home Depot U.S.A., Inc. v. Jackson, 587 U.S. 435 (2019), was a United States Supreme Court case that determined that a third-party defendant to a counterclaim submitted in a state-court civil action cannot remove its case to federal court. The Court explained, in a 5–4 decision, that although a third-party counterclaim defendant is a "defendant to a claim," removal can only be performed by the defendant to a "civil action." And this holds true even when the counterclaim is in the form of a class action. The Class Action Fairness Act of 2005 permits removal by "any defendant to a class action" but this does not extend removal rights to a third-party counterclaim defendant because they are not a defendant to the original case.

Although the decision technically only governs what court hears—rather than the actual outcome of—a particular case, the ruling has been described as being "pro-consumer" because of its potentially broader implications. The practical effect of the Court's holding is to make it "more difficult for class action defendants to transfer their cases from plaintiff-friendly state courts to more business-friendly federal courts." Thus, although the case theoretically only deals with venue, it may in practice benefit consumers with plausible claims against corporations.

Justice Samuel Alito, in the dissenting opinion, argued that a plaintiff who brings a lawsuit in their "own state's courts might . . . enjoy . . . a home court advantage against outsiders." To that end, he explained, Congress opened the "federal courts to certain disputes between citizens of different states." Although plaintiffs could take this option by simply filing their case in federal court, defendants did not have control over where a case was filed. So defendants were given the right of removal, which could be invoked to transfer a case from state to federal court. By denying removal here, Justice Alito argued, the majority had denied the defendant a "neutral forum."

== Legal background ==
Diversity jurisdiction refers to the jurisdiction of the federal courts over cases which involve citizens from multiple states. The purpose of such jurisdiction is to protect "litigants against potential prejudice in state courts" stemming from them being citizens of another state. For diversity jurisdiction to apply, however, there must be "complete diversity," such that "in cases with multiple parties no plaintiff could share citizenship with any defendant." There are two ways a case in diversity could end up in federal court: either the plaintiff files it there or the defendant invokes the right of removal after the plaintiff files the case in federal court. This case concerns the right of removal and, more specifically, who is entitled to invoke it and under what circumstances.

=== Removal to federal court ===
As relevant here, there are two laws which govern removal to federal court: 28 U.S.C. §1441 (the "general removal statute") and the Class Action Fairness Act of 2005 ("CAFA"). The first provides for the removal of "any civil action over which a federal court would have original jurisdiction." But such removal is only by "the defendant or the defendants" acting collectively. CAFA, on the other hand, authorizes the removal of a "class action" by "any defendant without the consent of all defendants."

The scope of the removal statutes is considered important because the forum a case is heard in can affect not just the outcome of the case itself but also what legal rules apply throughout the proceedings. For example, the Federal Judicial Center has noted the "establishment by federal judges of rules of decision that diverged from those of the state courts." And "federal courts are widely considered to be more business-friendly than state courts." As a result, removal to federal court is a "typical corporate tactic."

CAFA was enacted in response to the failure of the Private Securities Litigation Reform Act, which had targeted "perceived abuses of the class-action vehicle in litigation involving nationally traded securities, including spurious lawsuits, vexatious discovery requests, and manipulation by class action lawyers of the clients whom they . . . represent." These abuses, Congress concluded, "often forced" companies to "enter extortionate settlements in frivolous cases, just to avoid the litigation costs." The Reform Act responded to these perceived problems by limiting possible money awards from class actions as well as curbing the recoverable attorney's fees from such suits. The Act also mandated "sanctions for frivolous litigation" and paused "discovery pending resolution of any motion to dismiss."

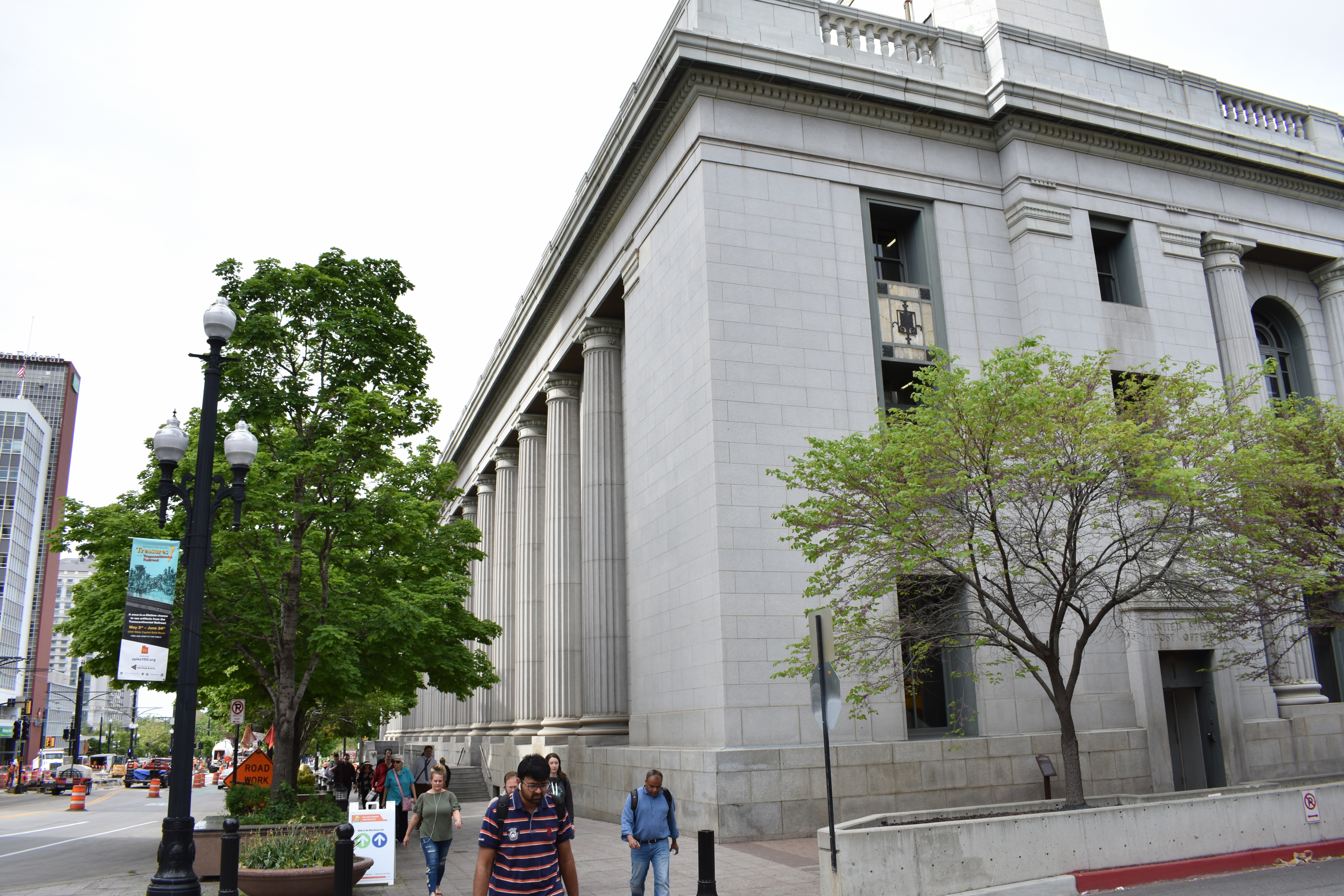
Businesses viewed federal courts as more sympathetic forums

Because the Reform Act tilted the federal playing-field decisively in favor of corporate defendants, consumer lawyers "found a workaround." Litigants could avoid the Reform Act's restrictions by simply pursuing their case in state court instead. Once their case made its way to state court, because diversity jurisdiction did not apply in the absence of complete diversity, plaintiffs could block federal removal by simply adding an "in-state defendant." Prior to the Reform Act, "state-court litigation of . . . class actions had been rare," but "within a decade state courts were handling most such cases." CAFA sought to change this by making it "easier for defendants to remove to federal courts" without the support of every defendant. This meant that an out-of-state defendant could remove a class action even if there was an in-state defendant who could not.

=== Third-party counterclaim ===
To circumvent CAFA's more generous removal provisions, consumer lawyers devised yet another tactic. This approach involved bootstrapping a class action in the form of a third-party counterclaim to an existing lawsuit against a consumer. For example, when a consumer is sued for an unpaid bill relating to the business they intend to sue, they would file a third-party countercomplaint against that business containing the claim they originally planned to sue the business for. The theory supporting this approach was that the third-party defendant would be unable to remove the case because, although they were a defendant to a "claim," they were not a defendant to the original "civil action." Corporate lawyers fought back against this strategy by asserting that CAFA expanded who was eligible to remove a class action to the category of "any defendant." And because, in their view, a third-party counterclaim defendant "qualifie[d] as one of 'the defendants' for purposes of removal," they reasoned that "such a party qualifies as 'any defendant' for purposes of [CAFA]." That disagreement gave rise to this Supreme Court case.

== Background ==
This case began in June 2016 when Citibank filed a debt-collection lawsuit against George Jackson, a North Carolina man, in North Carolina state court. The lawsuit alleged that Jackson had failed to make required payments "incurred on a Home Depot credit card." Jackson responded by filing a countercomplaint, which included claims against Citibank, as well as third-party class action claims against Home Depot—a corporation headquartered and domiciled out-of-state—and Carolina Water Systems, an in-state corporation.

In his countercomplaint, Jackson alleged that Home Depot and Carolina Water Systems had conspired to "induce homeowners to buy water treatment systems at inflated prices." On a legal level, Jackson charged that this scheme involved unlawful referral sales and deceptive and unfair trade practices in violation of state law. Jackson's claim against Citibank was that it was jointly and severally liable for this scheme and that "his obligations under the sale were null and void."

In September 2016, Citibank agreed to "dismiss its claims against Jackson." A month after that, Home Depot removed the case to federal court, invoking various provisions of federal law, including the general removal statute and CAFA. Jackson filed a motion to remand the case to state court, contending that a third-party defendant was not permitted to remove a case to federal court. The District Court agreed and remanded the case to the state court. The Court of Appeals for the Fourth Circuit affirmed.

== Supreme Court ==
On April 23, 2018, lawyers for Home Depot filed a petition for a writ of certiorari, presenting the question: "Whether an original defendant to a class-action claim can remove the class action if it otherwise satisfies the jurisdictional requirements of the Class Action Fairness Act when the class action was originally asserted as a counterclaim against a co-defendant." In their petition, the lawyers argued that a third-party counterclaim defendant is a "defendant" permitted to remove a case to federal court under the general removal statute, and that, in any event, CAFA authorizes removal by "any defendant," which includes third-party counterclaim defendants. Jackson's attorneys filed a brief opposing certiorari on June 25, 2018. In their brief, they argued the Court should not intervene because every court of appeals to consider the question to that point had agreed with their position, meaning there was no circuit split to resolve. They further argued that the decisions of the appeals courts were consistent with relevant Supreme Court precedent, weakening the case for review. After the petitioner filed a reply to Jackson's brief on July 10, the Court granted certiorari on September 27.

=== Oral arguments ===
Oral arguments
Transcript

The Court heard arguments in this case on January 25, 2019. William P. Barnette appeared on behalf of the petitioner, Home Depot, and began by observing that Home Depot was "just a defendant," because Congress established a dichotomy between the two types of parties to a case: plaintiffs and defendants. As Home Depot was not a plaintiff, Barnette reasoned, they must be a defendant. Thus, he contended that they were within the scope of both CAFA and the general removal statute. Barnette made this argument to get around an earlier decision of the Court (Shamrock Oil & Gas Corporation v. Sheets), which concerned whether a regular counterclaim defendant could remove their claim to federal court. In Shamrock Oil, the Court concluded that removal was not permitted because the counterclaim defendant was the original plaintiff and therefore the one who originally chose to file the case in state court. Barnette tried to distinguish Shamrock Oil by arguing that while the counterclaim defendant in that case was the original plaintiff (and therefore not a defendant), Home Depot was not an original party to this case: it only became a party as a defendant to the counterclaim. Hence, his observation that Home Depot was "just a defendant."

Justice Sonia Sotomayor questioned Barnette's reasoning. She pointed out that, "putting this outside the class action setting . . . all defendants have to agree to removal" and Jackson was also a defendant in this action. She wondered why Home Depot therefore would not "need Jackson's approval to remove." Barnette replied that the drafters of the general removal statute wanted to make sure that every side would "have one shot at a ... federal forum" and would not have wanted to give a counterclaim plaintiff a veto over removal by a counterclaim defendant. Justice Sotomayor doubted this interpretation, noting that the law actually enacted by the drafters says that defendants only "have a shot at removal" if "all defendants . . . agree." Barnette justified his position by asserting that the counterclaim plaintiff was a "defendant" only to the original action, but that the third-party counterclaim was effectively a separate action. Justice Neil Gorsuch asked how "the word 'defendant' expands and contracts like that," so as to include the original defendant only for certain purposes. Barnette argued that a defendant who files a counterclaim "steps into the role of plaintiff" and ceases to be a defendant for those purposes. In the end, Barnette's position was that the Court must evaluate who is a "defendant" for purposes of removal claim by claim.

After Barnette concluded, F. Paul Bland began his argument for the respondent. Bland contended that the relevant section of the general removal statute spoke of "civil actions" while other sections, which were not at issue in this case, spoke of "claims." In Bland's view, this discrepancy was proof that if the general removal statute meant to adopt Barnette's claim-by-claim interpretation, it would have said so by referring to "claims," not "civil actions."

Chief Justice John Roberts criticized this view, suggesting that whenever one party is suing another party, including in the case of a counterclaim, "even if you don't think that's a civil action properly conceived, it's certainly a proceeding of some kind." Bland replied that while it may be a proceeding of some kind, removal is only available in the case of a "civil action." Bland also argued that removal would not apply because the initial complaint by Citibank against Jackson was not within the "original jurisdiction" of the federal courts, and only a case within such jurisdiction can be removed. Justice Alito asked if the case would have qualified for removal if the counterclaim was in the original complaint, and Bland confirmed it would have. But Bland, in responding to a question from Justice Elena Kagan, agreed that original jurisdiction is determined "at the beginning," so a later counterclaim cannot create original jurisdiction.

Later in the argument, Justice Brett Kavanaugh asked Bland whether Home Depot was a "defendant" under CAFA. Bland replied that it was not because it was a "third-party claim defendant." Justice Kavanaugh criticized this distinction, pointing out that CAFA encompasses "any defendant." Bland, however, argued that the phrase "defendant" had a fixed meaning under the general removal statute which did not include third-party counterclaim defendants and inserting the word "any" could not change the meaning of "defendant." As an analogy, he referred to the phrase "any rabbit," and pointed out that the use of "any" does not "mean that a weasel or a gerbil becomes a rabbit." Chief Justice Roberts questioned the analogy, noting that while those other animals would not become rabbits, it "still means that a brown rabbit is a rabbit" and Bland himself had agreed that a third-party counterclaim defendant was a "type of defendant." Bland finally responded that a third-party counterclaim defendant was a "defendant in a colloquial way," but not under the general removal statute or, by extension, CAFA.

Justice Ruth Bader Ginsburg was not present for oral arguments in this case and Justice Clarence Thomas did not ask any questions.

=== Majority opinion ===
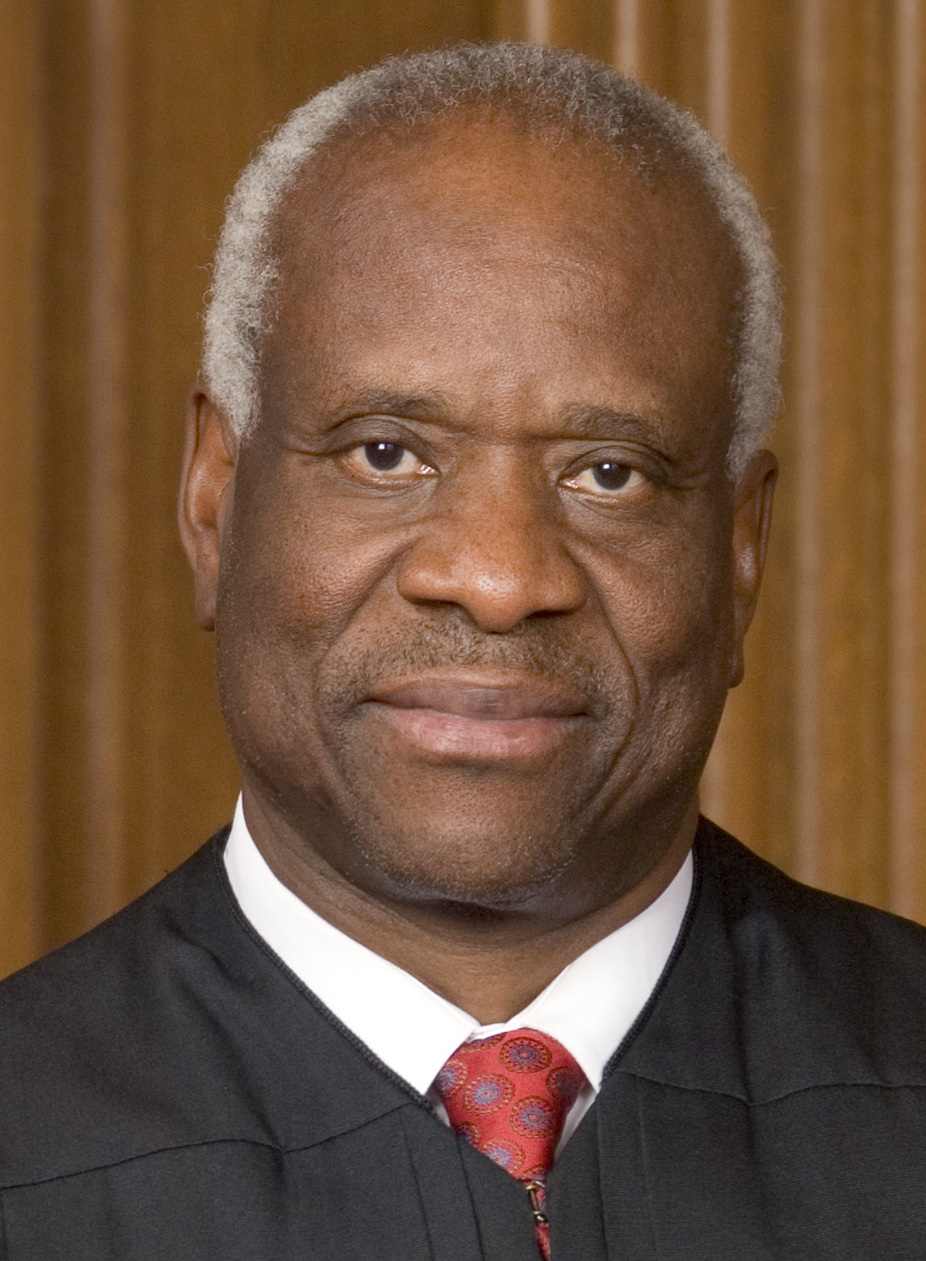
Justice Thomas delivered the opinion of the Court

Justice Thomas wrote the majority opinion, joined by Justices Ginsburg, Breyer, Sotomayor, and Kagan. The opinion proceeds in three main parts, with Thomas first describing the case's legal backdrop, then reviewing the general removal statute and CAFA in turn. In the first part, Thomas explains that the "federal courts are courts of limited jurisdiction." As an initial matter, the Constitution "delineates the character of the controversies over which federal judicial authority may extend" and then the inferior courts are further limited "to those subjects encompassed within a statutory grant of jurisdiction." Accordingly, for a federal court to exercise jurisdiction, there must at a minimum be a statutory basis for its jurisdiction. These principles set the stage for the Court's analysis because they assigned the burden of persuasion. To succeed, Home Depot would have needed to convince the Court that either the general removal statute or CAFA authorized removal.

In the second part, Thomas concluded that the general removal statute did not authorize removal by Home Depot. Although he agreed with Home Depot and the dissenting Justices that it was "plausible" to count Home Depot as a "defendant" under the general removal statute, he did not believe this was the "best" way to read the statute. Focusing on the text and structure of the statute and invoking as support a book written by Justice Antonin Scalia, Thomas reasoned that the broader context of the statute excluded "any counterclaim defendant, including parties brought into the lawsuit for the first time by the counterclaim." The general removal statute authorizes the removal of any "civil action" over which the federal courts have "original jurisdiction," provided the defendant to that action opts to remove it. To determine whether the federal courts have original jurisdiction over a civil action, Thomas explained, the courts evaluate "whether the plaintiff could have filed its operative complaint in federal court either because it raises claims arising under federal law or because it falls within the court's diversity jurisdiction." The defendant to a counterclaim is not the defendant to the operative complaint, which means that they are outside the scope of the general removal statute.

In further support of that conclusion, Thomas pointed to other uses of "defendant" in related contexts. For example, Thomas noted that Rule 14 of the Federal Rules of Civil Procedure, which governs "Third-Party Practice," distinguishes between "'the plaintiff,' a 'defendant' who becomes the 'third-party plaintiff,' and 'the third-party defendant' sued by the original defendant." Similarly, the language of Rule 12 "distinguishes between defendants and counterclaim defendants." In light of all this, Thomas believed it was unlikely Congress meant for "defendant" in the general removal statute to include third-party counterclaim defendants.

Thomas next turned to CAFA, concluding that Congress's use of "any defendant" did not change who constitutes a "defendant" for purposes of removal. Thomas reasoned that Congress did not "expand the types of parties eligible to remove a class action," and instead merely clarified that "certain limitations on removal that might otherwise apply do not limit removal under [CAFA]." Thomas also noted that because the phrase "defendant" is used in a number of other places across the removal statutes, accepting Home Depot's interpretation would result in some of those provisions becoming "incoherent." Finally, Thomas rejected the argument that the Court should interpret the statute to prevent defendants from using "the statute as a 'tactic' to prevent removal," observing that the tactic was a "consequence of the statute Congress wrote" and could only be changed by Congress.

=== Dissenting opinion ===
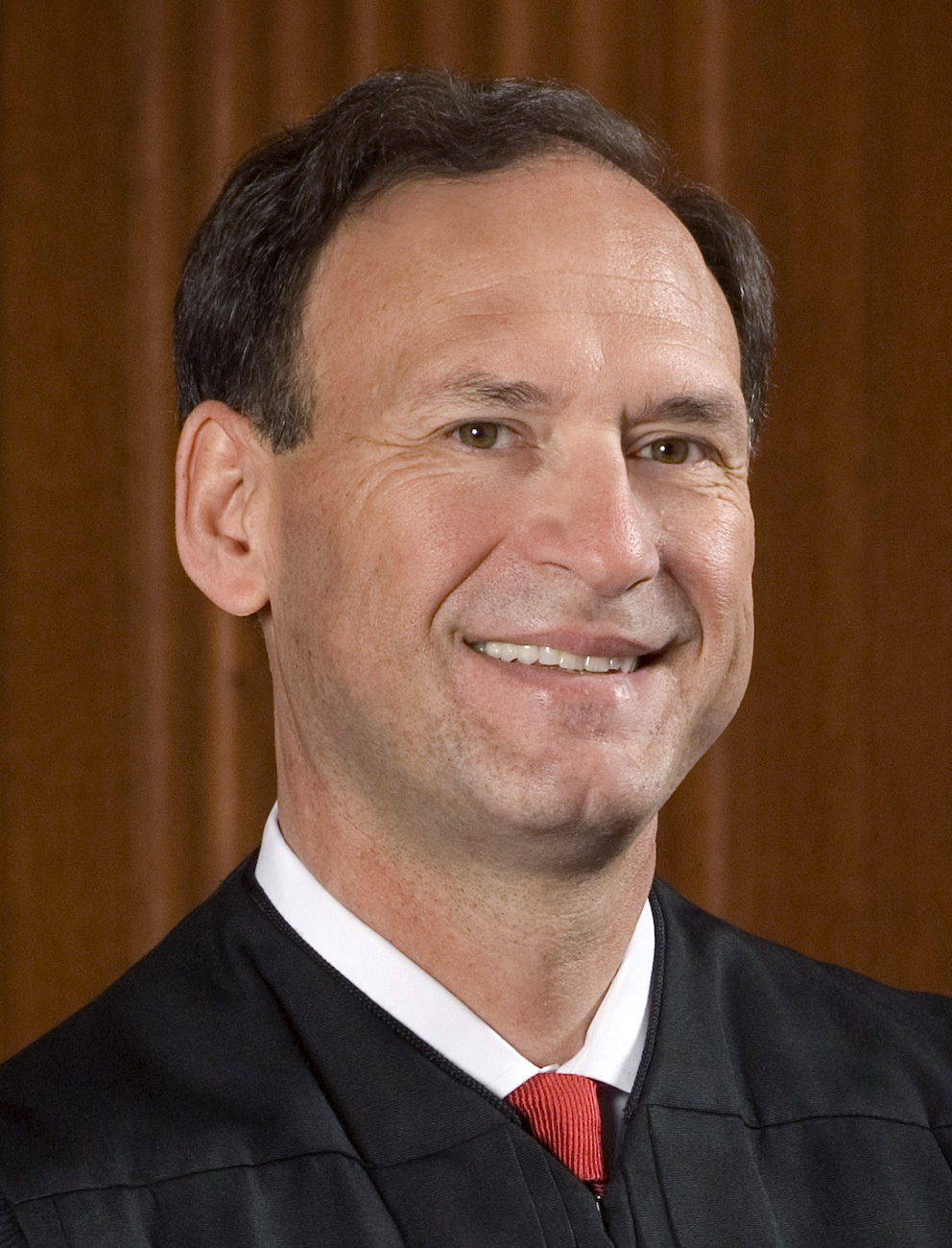
Justice Alito wrote the dissenting opinion

Justice Alito wrote the dissenting opinion, joined by Chief Justice Roberts and Justices Gorsuch and Kavanaugh. Alito argued that CAFA's use of "any defendant" expanded the reach of the general removal statute to third-party class-action counterclaim defendants, that the distinction between third-party counterclaim defendants and regular defendants is "irrational", and that, by accepting Jackson's argument, the Court had wrongly blessed a "tactic" that allowed consumer attorneys to deny businesses access to a "neutral forum."

== See also ==
- List of United States Supreme Court cases, volume 587
