= 2018 term United States Supreme Court opinions of Samuel Alito =

The 2018 term of the Supreme Court of the United States began October 1, 2018, and concluded October 6, 2019. This was the fourteenth term of Associate Justice Samuel Alito's tenure on the Court.
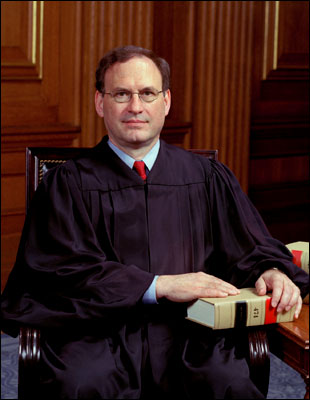

Samuel Alito 2018 term statistics

| 7 | Majority or plurality | 6 | Concurrence | 1 | Other |
| 11 | Dissent | 1 | Concurrence/dissent | Total = | 26 |
| Bench opinions = 20 | | Opinions relating to orders = 6 | | In-chambers opinions = 0 |
| Unanimous opinions: 0 | | Most joined by: Kavanaugh (14) | | Least joined by: Ginsburg (2) |

| Type | Case | Citation | Issues | Joined by | Other opinions |
|---|---|---|---|---|---|
| | Hester v. United States | 586 U.S. ___ (2019) | Sixth Amendment • right to determination by jury of facts supporting restitution order | | Gorsuch |
Alito concurred in the Court's denial of certiorari.
| | White v. Kentucky | 586 U.S. ___ (2019) | Eighth Amendment • death penalty • determination of intellectual disability | Thomas, Gorsuch | |
Alito dissented from the Court's grant of certiorari, vacatur of the lower court's decision, and remand.
| | Kennedy v. Bremerton School District | 586 U.S. ___ (2019) | First Amendment • Free Exercise Clause • Free Speech Clause • Establishment Clause • visible prayer by public school official | Thomas, Gorsuch, Kavanaugh | |
Alito filed a statement respecting the Court's denial of certiorari.
| | Moore v. Texas | 586 U.S. ___ (2019) | Eighth Amendment to the United States Constitution • death penalty • execution of the intellectually disabled | Thomas, Gorsuch | per curiam; Roberts |
| | Madison v. Alabama | 586 U.S. ___ (2019) | Eighth Amendment • death penalty • mental competence at time of execution • amnesia | Thomas, Gorsuch | Kagan |
| | Nielsen v. Preap | 586 U.S. ___ (2019) | Illegal Immigration Reform and Immigrant Responsibility Act of 1996 • detention of aliens without bond for commission of certain crimes | Roberts, Kavanaugh; Thomas, Gorsuch (in part) | Thomas; Kavanaugh; Breyer |
| | Republic of Sudan v. Harrison | 587 U.S. ___ (2019) | Foreign Sovereign Immunities Act of 1976 • service on foreign state | Roberts, Ginsburg, Breyer, Sotomayor, Kagan, Gorsuch, Kavanaugh | Thomas |
| | Dahne v. Richey | 587 U.S. ___ (2019) | First Amendment • free speech • prisoners' rights • choice of language in inmate grievance | Thomas, Kavanaugh | |
Alito dissented from the Court's denial of certiorari.
| | Murphy v. Collier | 587 U.S. ___ (2019) | First Amendment • Establishment Clause • death penalty • choice of spiritual advisor at execution | Thomas, Gorsuch | Kavanaugh |
Alito dissented from the Court's grant of application for stay of execution.
| | Merck Sharp & Dohme Corp. v. Albrecht | 587 U.S. ___ (2019) | FDA approval of pharmaceutical labeling • preemption of state failure-to-warn law | Roberts, Kavanaugh | Breyer; Thomas |
| | Herrera v. Wyoming | 587 U.S. ___ (2019) | effect of statehood on Native American treaty rights | Roberts, Thomas, Kavanaugh | Sotomayor |
| | Santos v. United States | 587 U.S. ___ (2019) | Armed Career Criminal Act • definition of "violent felony" | Thomas | |
Alito dissented from the Court's grant of certiorari, vacatur, and remand.
| | Home Depot U. S. A., Inc. v. Jackson | 587 U.S. ___ (2019) | removal jurisdiction • Class Action Fairness Act of 2005 • third-party counterclaims | Roberts, Gorsuch, Kavanaugh | Thomas |
| | Virginia House of Delegates v. Bethune-Hill | 587 U.S. ___ (2019) | Article III • standing of single chamber of bicameral legislature • legislative redistricting | Roberts, Breyer, Kavanaugh | Ginsburg |
| | Gamble v. United States | 587 U.S. ___ (2019) | Fifth Amendment • Double Jeopardy Clause • dual sovereignty doctrine | Roberts, Thomas, Breyer, Sotomayor, Kagan, Kavanaugh | Thomas; Ginsburg; Gorsuch |
| | American Legion v. American Humanist Assn. | 588 U.S. ___ (2019) | First Amendment • Establishment Clause • cross as public war memorial | Roberts, Breyer, Kavanaugh; Kagan (in part) | Thomas; Breyer; Kagan; Gorsuch; Kavanaugh; Ginsburg |
| | Gundy v. United States | 588 U.S. ___ (2019) | Sex Offender Registration and Notification Act • authority of Attorney General to determine pre-act offender registration requirements • Article I • nondelegation doctrine | | Kagan; Gorsuch |
| | Rehaif v. United States | 588 U.S. ___ (2019) | federal firearms laws • firearm possession by alien in country illegally • scienter | Thomas | Breyer |
| | North Carolina Dept. of Revenue v. Kimberley Rice Kaestner 1992 Family Trust | 588 U.S. ___ (2019) | Fourteenth Amendment • Due Process Clause • state taxation of trust based on beneficiary residence | Roberts, Gorsuch | Sotomayor |
| | Flowers v. Mississippi | 588 U.S. ___ (2019) | jury selection • racially motivated peremptory strike | | Kavanaugh; Thomas |
| | Dutra Group v. Batterton | 588 U.S. ___ (2019) | admiralty law • unseaworthiness • punitive damages | Roberts, Thomas, Kagan, Gorsuch, Kavanaugh | Ginsburg |
| | Iancu v. Brunetti | 588 U.S. ___ (2019) | trademark law • Lanham Act • registration of immoral or scandalous trademarks • First Amendment • free speech | | Kagan; Roberts; Breyer; Sotomayor |
| | Tennessee Wine and Spirits Retailers Assn. v. Thomas | 588 U.S. ___ (2019) | Article I • Commerce Clause • residency requirement for retail liquor store license • Twenty-first Amendment | Roberts, Ginsburg, Breyer, Sotomayor, Kagan, Kavanaugh | Gorsuch |
| | United States v. Haymond | 588 U.S. ___ (2019) | Fifth Amendment • Sixth Amendment • right to jury trial • mandatory minimum sentence for possession of child pornography • judicial finding of fact | Roberts, Thomas, Kavanaugh | Gorsuch; Breyer |
| | Department of Commerce v. New York | 588 U.S. ___ (2019) | addition of citizenship question to 2020 United States census • Article I • Enumeration Clause • Administrative Procedures Act • Article III • standing | | Roberts; Thomas; Breyer |
| | Mitchell v. Wisconsin | 588 U.S. ___ (2019) | Fourth Amendment • blood alcohol test taken from unconscious driver • exigent circumstances | Roberts, Breyer, Kavanaugh | Thomas; Sotomayor; Gorsuch |
