= 2018 term United States Supreme Court opinions of Neil Gorsuch =

The 2018 term of the Supreme Court of the United States began October 1, 2018, and concluded October 6, 2019. This was the third term of Associate Justice Neil Gorsuch's tenure on the Court.
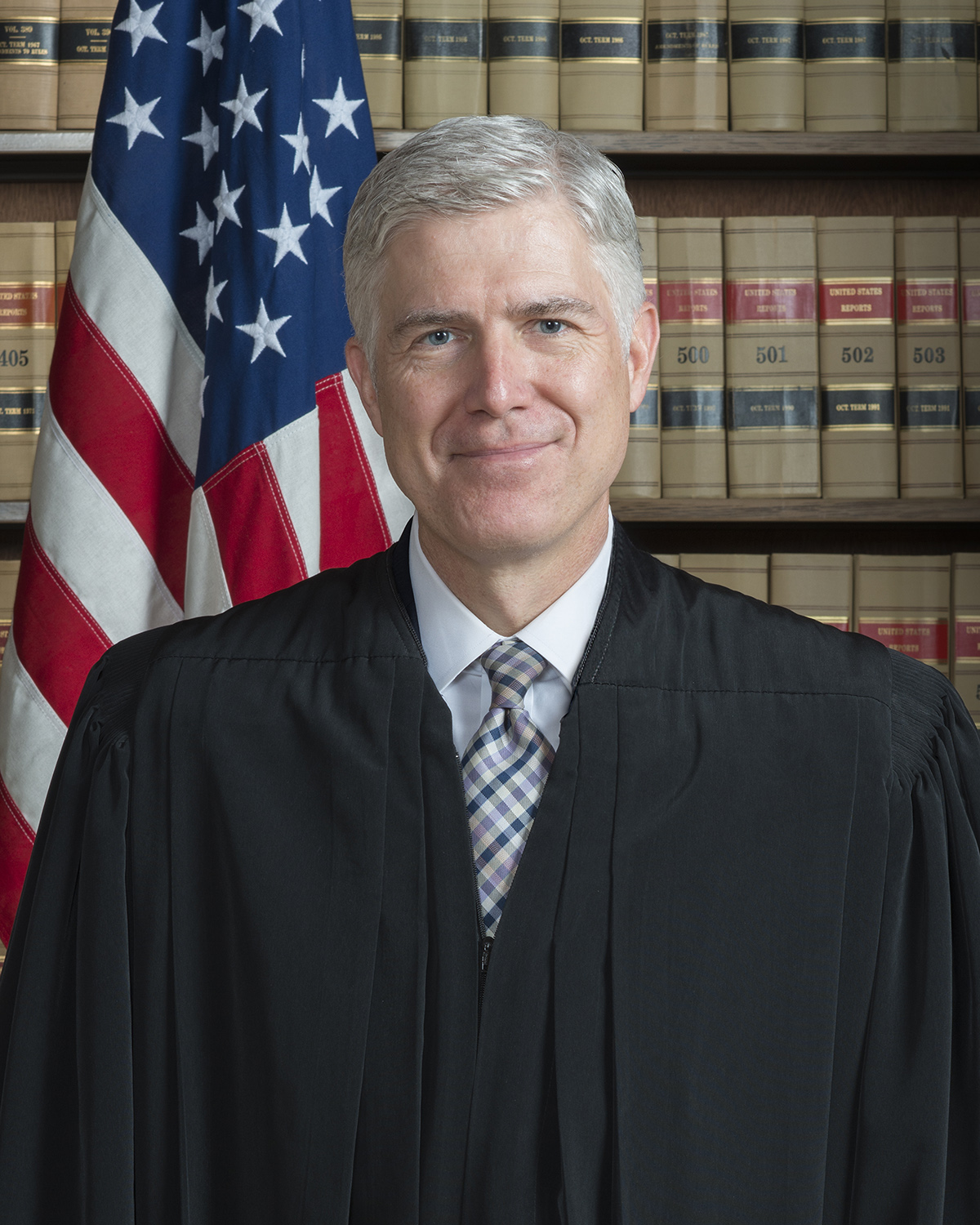

Neil Gorsuch 2018 term statistics

| 8 | Majority or plurality | 4 | Concurrence | 0 | Other |
| 11 | Dissent | 2 | Concurrence/dissent | Total = | 25 |
| Bench opinions = 22 | | Opinions relating to orders = 3 | | In-chambers opinions = 0 |
| Unanimous opinions: 1 | | Most joined by: Thomas (14) | | Least joined by: Breyer (3) |

| Type | Case | Citation | Issues | Joined by | Other opinions |
|---|---|---|---|---|---|
| | In re Department of Commerce | 586 U.S. ___ (2018) | 2020 United States census • citizenship question | Thomas | |
Gorsuch concurred in part and dissented in part from the Court's partial grant of application for stay.
| | Stuart v. Alabama | 586 U.S. ___ (2018) | Sixth Amendment • Confrontation Clause • cross-examination of forensic expert | Sotomayor | |
Gorsuch dissented from the Court's denial of certiorari.
| | Hester v. United States | 586 U.S. ___ (2019) | Sixth Amendment • right to determination by jury of facts supporting restitution order | Sotomayor | Alito |
Gorsuch dissented from the Court's denial of certiorari.
| | New Prime Inc. v. Oliveira | 586 U.S. ___ (2019) | Federal Arbitration Act • exclusion of contracts of employment for certain transportation workers | Roberts, Thomas, Ginsburg, Breyer, Alito, Sotomayor, Kagan | Ginsburg |
| | Timbs v. Indiana | 586 U.S. ___ (2019) | Eighth Amendment • excessive fines • Fourteenth Amendment • Due Process Clause • Incorporation Doctrine • civil forfeiture | | Ginsburg; Thomas |
| | Dawson v. Steager | 586 U.S. ___ (2019) | intergovernmental tax immunity doctrine • exemption of select state employee pensions from tax applied to federal employee pensions | Unanimous | |
| | BNSF R. Co. v. Loos | 586 U.S. ___ (2019) | Federal Employers' Liability Act • Railroad Retirement Tax Act • tax status of damages for lost wages due to injury | Thomas | Ginsburg |
| | Washington State Dept. of Licensing v. Cougar Den, Inc. | 586 U.S. ___ (2019) | Yakama Nation Treaty of 1855 • state taxation of fuel importers | Ginsburg | Breyer; Roberts; Kavanaugh |
| | Air & Liquid Systems Corp. v. DeVries | 586 U.S. ___ (2019) | maritime law • product liability • manufacturer duty to warn | Thomas, Alito | Kavanaugh |
| | Biestek v. Berryhill | 587 U.S. ___ (2019) | Social Security Administration claims process • effect of expert denying data request on evidentiary value of testimony | Ginsburg | Kagan; Sotomayor |
| | Bucklew v. Precythe | 587 U.S. ___ (2019) | Eighth Amendment • death penalty • challenges to method of execution | Roberts, Thomas, Alito, Kavanaugh | Thomas; Kavanaugh; Breyer; Sotomayor |
| | Apple, Inc. v. Pepper | 587 U.S. ___ (2019) | antitrust law • monopolization of mobile app market • directness of purchase | Roberts, Thomas, Alito | Kavanaugh |
| | Mission Product Holdings, Inc. v. Tempnology, LLC | 587 U.S. ___ (2019) | bankruptcy law • Chapter 11 • debtor rejection of executory contract | | Kagan; Sotomayor |
| | Nieves v. Bartlett | 587 U.S. ___ (2019) | First Amendment • free speech • retaliatory arrest • Fourth Amendment • probable cause | | Roberts; Thomas; Ginsburg; Sotomayor |
| | Azar v. Allina Health Services | 587 U.S. ___ (2019) | Medicare Act • notice-and-comment rulemaking requirement | Roberts, Thomas, Ginsburg, Alito, Sotomayor, Kagan | Breyer |
| | Gamble v. United States | 587 U.S. ___ (2019) | Fifth Amendment • Double Jeopardy Clause • dual sovereignty doctrine | | Alito; Thomas; Ginsburg |
| | Virginia Uranium, Inc. v. Warren | 587 U.S. ___ (2019) | Atomic Energy Act • federal preemption of state uranium mining laws | Thomas, Kavanaugh | Ginsburg; Roberts |
| | American Legion v. American Humanist Assn. | 588 U.S. ___ (2019) | First Amendment • Establishment Clause • cross as public war memorial | Thomas | Alito; Thomas; Breyer; Kagan; Kavanaugh; Ginsburg |
| | Gundy v. United States | 588 U.S. ___ (2019) | Sex Offender Registration and Notification Act • authority of Attorney General to determine pre-act offender registration requirements • Article I • nondelegation doctrine | Roberts, Thomas | Kagan; Alito |
| | Food Marketing Institute v. Argus Leader Media | 588 U.S. ___ (2019) | Freedom of Information Act • confidential commercial information exemption | Roberts, Thomas, Alito, Kagan, Kavanaugh | Breyer |
| | United States v. Davis | 588 U.S. ___ (2019) | federal criminal law • sentence enhancement for use of firearm during crime of violence • vagueness doctrine | Ginsburg, Breyer, Sotomayor, Kagan | Kavanaugh |
| | Tennessee Wine and Spirits Retailers Assn. v. Thomas | 588 U.S. ___ (2019) | Article I • Commerce Clause • residency requirement for retail liquor store license • Twenty-first Amendment | Thomas | Alito |
| | Kisor v. Wilkie | 588 U.S. ___ (2019) | administrative law • deference to agency interpretation of ambiguous regulation • Administrative Procedures Act • Article III • stare decisis | Thomas; Alito, Kavanaugh (in part) | Kagan; Roberts; Kavanaugh |
| | United States v. Haymond | 588 U.S. ___ (2019) | Fifth Amendment • Sixth Amendment • right to jury trial • mandatory minimum sentence for possession of child pornography • judicial finding of fact | Ginsburg, Sotomayor, Kagan | Breyer; Alito |
| | Mitchell v. Wisconsin | 588 U.S. ___ (2019) | Fourth Amendment • blood alcohol test taken from unconscious driver • exigent circumstances | | Alito; Thomas; Sotomayor |
