= 2018 term United States Supreme Court opinions of Clarence Thomas =

The 2018 term of the Supreme Court of the United States began October 1, 2018, and concluded October 6, 2019. This was the twenty-eighth term of Associate Justice Clarence Thomas's tenure on the Court.
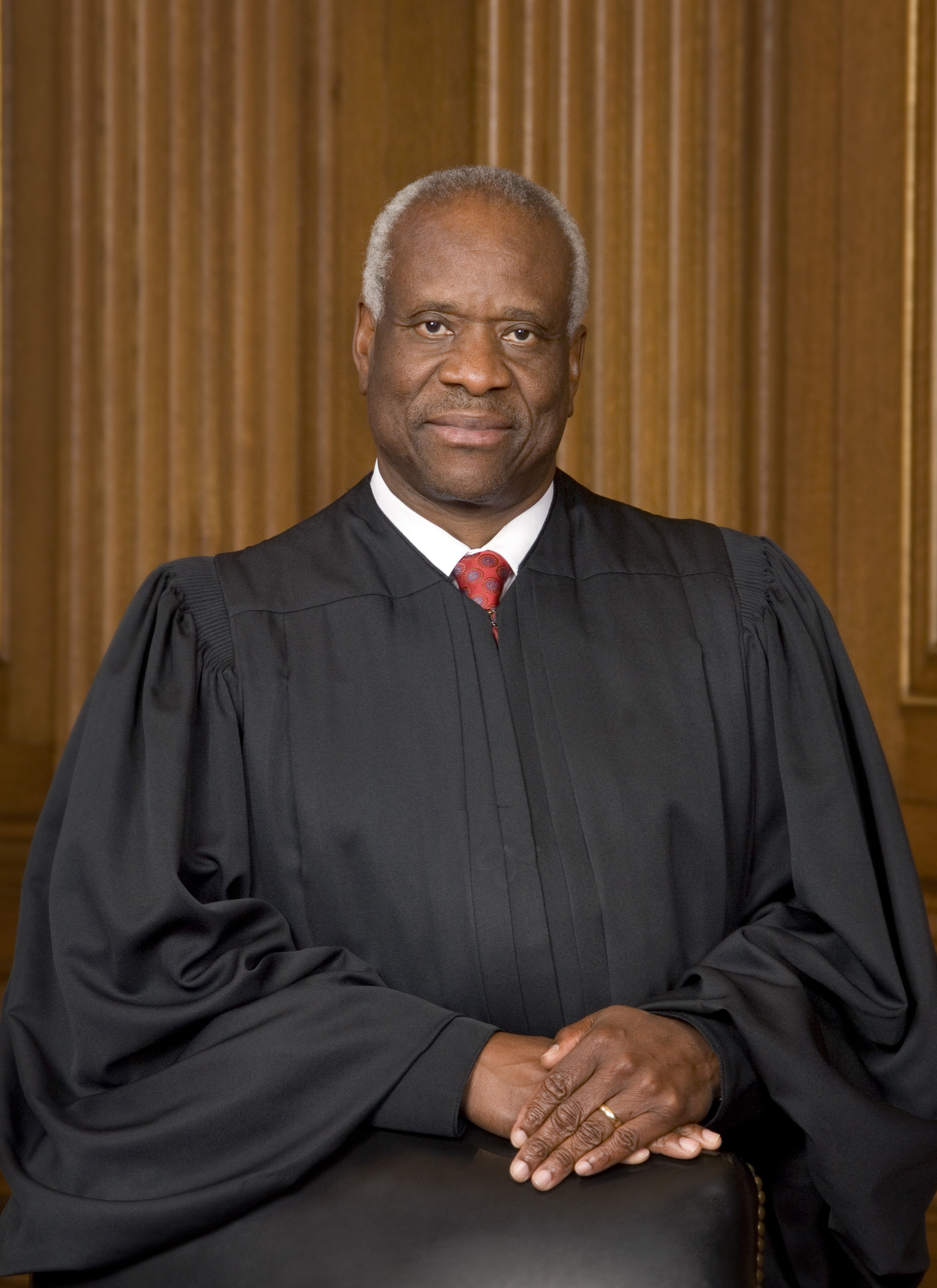

Clarence Thomas 2018 term statistics

8	Majority or plurality	17	Concurrence	0	Other
8	Dissent	1	Concurrence/dissent	Total =	34
Bench opinions = 28		Opinions relating to orders = 6		In-chambers opinions = 0
Unanimous opinions: 4		Most joined by: Gorsuch (14 in full, 1 in part)		Least joined by: Sotomayor (5)

Type	Case	Citation	Issues	Joined by	Other opinions
	Reynolds v. Florida	586 U.S. ___ (2018)	Eighth Amendment • capital punishment • jury instructions		Breyer; Sotomayor
Thomas concurred in the Court's denial of certiorari.
	Gee v. Planned Parenthood of Gulf Coast, Inc.	586 U.S. ___ (2018)	private right of action to challenge State determination of qualified Medicaid providers • defunding of Planned Parenthood	Alito, Gorsuch	
Thomas dissented from the Court's denial of certiorari.
	Culbertson v. Berryhill	586 U.S. ___ (2019)	Social Security Act • cap on claimant attorney fees	Unanimous	
	Stokeling v. United States	586 U.S. ___ (2019)	Armed Career Criminal Act • definition of "physical force"	Breyer, Alito, Gorsuch, Kavanaugh	Sotomayor
	Helsinn Healthcare S. A. v. Teva Pharmaceuticals USA, Inc.	586 U.S. ___ (2019)	patent law • Leahy-Smith America Invents Act • invalidation of patent under "on sale" provision	Unanimous	
	McKee v. Cosby	586 U.S. ___ (2019)	First Amendment • free speech • defamation		
Thomas concurred in the Court's denial of certiorari.
	Timbs v. Indiana	586 U.S. ___ (2019)	Eighth Amendment • excessive fines • Fourteenth Amendment • Due Process Clause • Incorporation Doctrine • Privileges and Immunities Clause • civil forfeiture		Ginsburg; Gorsuch
	Garza v. Idaho	586 U.S. ___ (2019)	Sixth Amendment • ineffective assistance of counsel • failure to file notice of appeal • waiver of right to appeal	Gorsuch; Alito (in part)	Sotomayor
	Nielsen v. Preap	586 U.S. ___ (2019)	Illegal Immigration Reform and Immigrant Responsibility Act of 1996 • detention of aliens without bond for commission of certain crimes • Article III	Gorsuch	Alito; Kavanaugh; Breyer
	Frank v. Gaos	586 U.S. ___ (2019)	Stored Communications Act • Article III • standing • class certification • cy pres		per curiam
	Republic of Sudan v. Harrison	587 U.S. ___ (2019)	Foreign Sovereign Immunities Act of 1976 • service on foreign state		Alito
	Lorenzo v. SEC	587 U.S. ___ (2019)	securities fraud • SEC Rule 10b-5 • dissemination of false or misleading statements	Gorsuch	Breyer
	Bucklew v. Precythe	587 U.S. ___ (2019)	Eighth Amendment • death penalty • challenges to method of execution		Gorsuch; Kavanaugh; Breyer; Sotomayor
	Lamps Plus, Inc. v. Varela	587 U.S. ___ (2019)	Federal Arbitration Act • contractual agreement to class action arbitration		Roberts; Ginsburg; Breyer; Sotomayor; Kagan
	Franchise Tax Bd. of Cal. v. Hyatt	587 U.S. ___ (2019)	sovereign immunity • private suits against states in courts of other states	Roberts, Alito, Gorsuch, Kavanaugh	Breyer
	Cochise Consultancy, Inc. v. United States ex rel. Hunt	587 U.S. ___ (2019)	False Claims Act • statute of limitations	Unanimous	
	Price v. Dunn	587 U.S. ___ (2019)	Eighth Amendment • death penalty • challenges to method of execution	Alito, Gorsuch	
Thomas concurred in the Court's denial of certiorari.
	Merck Sharp & Dohme Corp. v. Albrecht	587 U.S. ___ (2019)	FDA approval of pharmaceutical labeling • preemption of state failure-to-warn law		Breyer; Alito
	Daniel v. United States	587 U.S. ___ (2019)	Federal Tort Claims Act • right of military personnel to sue government for federal employee negligence		
Thomas dissented from the Court's denial of certiorari.
	Nieves v. Bartlett	587 U.S. ___ (2019)	First Amendment • free speech • retaliatory arrest • Fourth Amendment • probable cause		Roberts; Ginsburg; Gorsuch; Sotomayor
	Home Depot U. S. A., Inc. v. Jackson	587 U.S. ___ (2019)	removal jurisdiction • Class Action Fairness Act of 2005 • third-party counterclaims	Ginsburg, Breyer, Sotomayor, Kagan	Alito
	Box v. Planned Parenthood of Indiana and Kentucky, Inc.	587 U.S. ___ (2019)	abortion rights • eugenics		per curiam; Ginsburg
	Mont v. United States	587 U.S. ___ (2019)	tolling of supervised release for new imprisonment • Sentencing Reform Act of 1984	Roberts, Ginsburg, Alito, Kavanaugh	Sotomayor
	Parker Drilling Management Services, Ltd. v. Newton	587 U.S. ___ (2019)	Outer Continental Shelf Lands Act • applicability of state law to Outer Continental Shelf • Fair Labor Standards Act of 1938 • minimum wage	Unanimous	
	Quarles v. United States	587 U.S. ___ (2019)	Armed Career Criminal Act • remaining-in burglary as violent felony		Kavanaugh
	Gamble v. United States	587 U.S. ___ (2019)	Fifth Amendment • Double Jeopardy Clause • dual sovereignty doctrine • stare decisis		Alito; Ginsburg; Gorsuch
	PDR Network, LLC v. Carlton Harris Chiropractic, Inc.	588 U.S. ___ (2019)	Telephone Consumer Protection Act of 1991 • unsolicited advertisement by fax • Administrative Orders Review Act	Gorsuch	Breyer; Kavanaugh
	American Legion v. American Humanist Assn.	588 U.S. ___ (2019)	First Amendment • Establishment Clause • cross as public war memorial • Incorporation doctrine		Alito; Breyer; Kagan; Gorsuch; Kavanaugh; Ginsburg
	McDonough v. Smith	588 U.S. ___ (2019)	Section 1983 • prosecution based on false evidence • statute of limitations	Kagan, Gorsuch	Sotomayor
	Knick v. Township of Scott	588 U.S. ___ (2019)	Fifth Amendment • Takings Clause • state court exhaustion of remedies		Roberts; Kagan
	Flowers v. Mississippi	588 U.S. ___ (2019)	jury selection • racially motivated peremptory strike	Gorsuch (in part)	Kavanaugh; Alito
	Department of Commerce v. New York	588 U.S. ___ (2019)	addition of citizenship question to 2020 United States census • Article I • Enumeration Clause • Administrative Procedures Act • Article III • standing	Gorsuch, Kavanaugh	Roberts; Breyer; Alito
	Mitchell v. Wisconsin	588 U.S. ___ (2019)	Fourth Amendment • blood alcohol test taken from unconscious driver • exigent circumstances		Alito; Sotomayor; Gorsuch
	Harris v. West Alabama Women’s Center	588 U.S. ___ (2019)	abortion rights		
Thomas concurred in the Court's denial of certiorari.
