= 2018 term United States Supreme Court opinions of Stephen Breyer =

The 2018 term of the Supreme Court of the United States began October 1, 2018, and concluded October 6, 2019. This was the twenty-fifth term of Associate Justice Stephen Breyer's tenure on the Court.
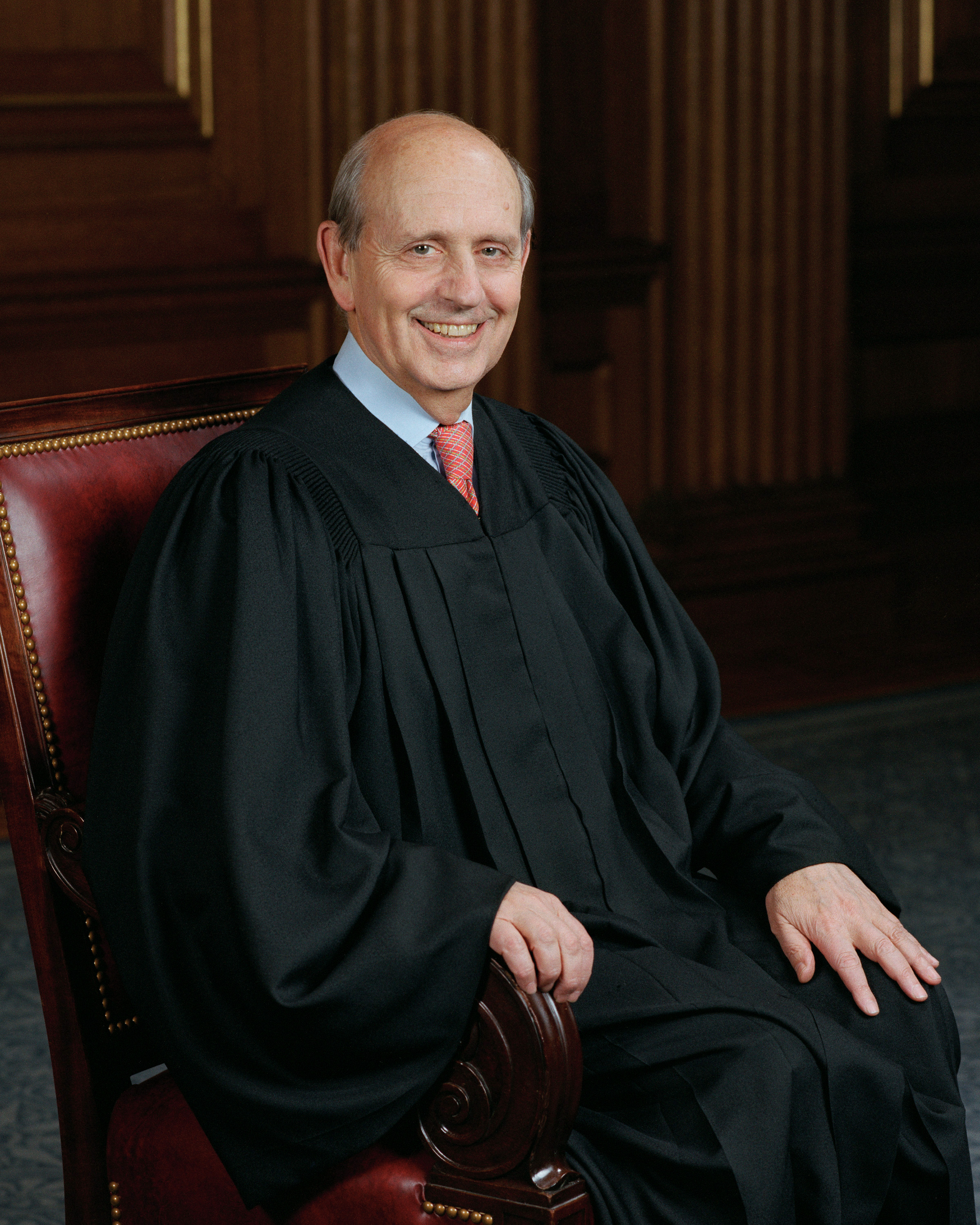

Stephen Breyer 2018 term statistics

| 8 | Majority or plurality | 2 | Concurrence | 2 | Other |
| 9 | Dissent | 4 | Concurrence/dissent | Total = | 25 |
| Bench opinions = 20 | | Opinions relating to orders = 5 | | In-chambers opinions = 0 |
| Unanimous opinions: 3 | | Most joined by: Ginsburg (14 in full, 1 in part) | | Least joined by: Thomas, Alito, Kavanaugh (4) |

| Type | Case | Citation | Issues | Joined by | Other opinions |
|---|---|---|---|---|---|
| | Reynolds v. Florida | 586 U.S. ___ (2018) | Eighth Amendment • capital punishment • jury instructions | | Thomas; Sotomayor |
Breyer filed a statement respecting the Court's denial of certiorari.
| | United States v. Stitt | 586 U.S. ___ (2018) | Armed Career Criminal Act • definition of "burglary" as prior conviction | Unanimous | |
| | Jam v. International Finance Corp. | 586 U.S. ___ (2019) | International Organizations Immunities Act • relationship to Foreign Sovereign Immunities Act | | Roberts |
Kavanaugh did not participate.
| | Washington State Dept. of Licensing v. Cougar Den, Inc. | 586 U.S. ___ (2019) | Yakama Nation Treaty of 1855 • state taxation of fuel importers | Sotomayor, Kagan | Gorsuch; Roberts; Kavanaugh |
| | Nielsen v. Preap | 586 U.S. ___ (2019) | Illegal Immigration Reform and Immigrant Responsibility Act of 1996 • detention of aliens without bond for commission of certain crimes | Ginsburg, Sotomayor, Kagan | Alito; Thomas; Kavanaugh |
| | Obduskey v. McCarthy & Holthus LLP | 586 U.S. ___ (2019) | Fair Debt Collection Practices Act • nonjudicial foreclosure proceedings | Unanimous | Sotomayor |
| | Lorenzo v. SEC | 587 U.S. ___ (2019) | securities fraud • SEC Rule 10b-5 • dissemination of false or misleading statements | Roberts, Ginsburg, Alito, Sotomayor, Kagan | Thomas |
| | Bucklew v. Precythe | 587 U.S. ___ (2019) | Eighth Amendment • death penalty • challenges to method of execution | Ginsburg, Sotomayor, Kagan (in part) | Gorsuch; Thomas; Kavanaugh; Sotomayor |
| | Dunn v. Price | 587 U.S. ___ (2019) | Eighth Amendment • capital punishment • risk of substantial pain and suffering | Ginsburg, Sotomayor, Kagan | |
Breyer dissented from the Court's grant of application to vacate stay of execution.
| | Lamps Plus, Inc. v. Varela | 587 U.S. ___ (2019) | Federal Arbitration Act • contractual agreement to class action arbitration | | Roberts; Thomas; Ginsburg; Sotomayor; Kagan |
| | Franchise Tax Bd. of Cal. v. Hyatt | 587 U.S. ___ (2019) | sovereign immunity • private suits against states in courts of other states | Ginsburg, Sotomayor, Kagan | Thomas |
| | Merck Sharp & Dohme Corp. v. Albrecht | 587 U.S. ___ (2019) | FDA approval of pharmaceutical labeling • preemption of state failure-to-warn law | Thomas, Ginsburg, Sotomayor, Kagan, Gorsuch | Thomas; Alito |
| | Price v. Dunn | 587 U.S. ___ (2019) | Eighth Amendment • death penalty • challenges to method of execution | Ginsburg; Sotomayor, Kagan (in part) | |
Breyer dissented from the Court's denial of application for stay of execution.
| | Taggart v. Lorenzen | 587 U.S. ___ (2019) | bankruptcy law • Chapter 7 • civil contempt for violation of discharge order | Unanimous | |
| | Azar v. Allina Health Services | 587 U.S. ___ (2019) | Medicare Act • notice-and-comment rulemaking requirement | | Gorsuch |
| | Return Mail, Inc. v. Postal Service | 587 U.S. ___ (2019) | patent law • Leahy-Smith America Invents Act of 2011 • eligibility of federal government to initiate Patent Trial and Appeal Board post-patent issuance review | Ginsburg, Kagan | Sotomayor |
| | Al-Alwi v. Trump | 587 U.S. ___ (2019) | Authorization for Use of Military Force • indefinite detention of enemy combatants | | |
Breyer filed a statement respecting the Court's denial of certiorari.
| | PDR Network, LLC v. Carlton Harris Chiropractic, Inc. | 588 U.S. ___ (2019) | Telephone Consumer Protection Act of 1991 • unsolicited advertisement by fax • Administrative Orders Review Act | Roberts, Ginsburg, Sotomayor, Kagan | Thomas; Kavanaugh |
| | American Legion v. American Humanist Assn. | 588 U.S. ___ (2019) | First Amendment • Establishment Clause • cross as public war memorial | Kagan | Alito; Thomas; Kagan; Gorsuch; Kavanaugh; Ginsburg |
| | Rehaif v. United States | 588 U.S. ___ (2019) | federal firearms laws • firearm possession by alien in country illegally • scienter | Roberts, Ginsburg, Sotomayor, Kagan, Gorsuch, Kavanaugh | Alito |
| | Iancu v. Brunetti | 588 U.S. ___ (2019) | trademark law • Lanham Act • registration of immoral or scandalous trademarks • First Amendment • free speech | | Kagan; Alito; Roberts; Sotomayor |
| | Food Marketing Institute v. Argus Leader Media | 588 U.S. ___ (2019) | Freedom of Information Act • confidential commercial information exemption | Ginsburg, Sotomayor | Gorsuch |
| | United States v. Haymond | 588 U.S. ___ (2019) | Fifth Amendment • Sixth Amendment • right to jury trial • mandatory minimum sentence for possession of child pornography • judicial finding of fact | | Gorsuch; Alito |
| | Department of Commerce v. New York | 588 U.S. ___ (2019) | addition of citizenship question to 2020 United States census • Article I • Enumeration Clause • Administrative Procedures Act • Article III • standing | Ginsburg, Sotomayor, Kagan | Roberts; Thomas; Alito |
| | Trump v. Sierra Club | 588 U.S. ___ (2019) | Mexico–United States border wall • National Emergency Concerning the Southern Border of the United States • irreparable harm | | |
Breyer concurred in part and dissented in part from the Court's grant of application for stay.
