= 2018 term United States Supreme Court opinions of Sonia Sotomayor =

The 2018 term of the Supreme Court of the United States began October 1, 2018, and concluded October 6, 2019. This was the tenth term of Associate Justice Sonia Sotomayor's tenure on the Court.
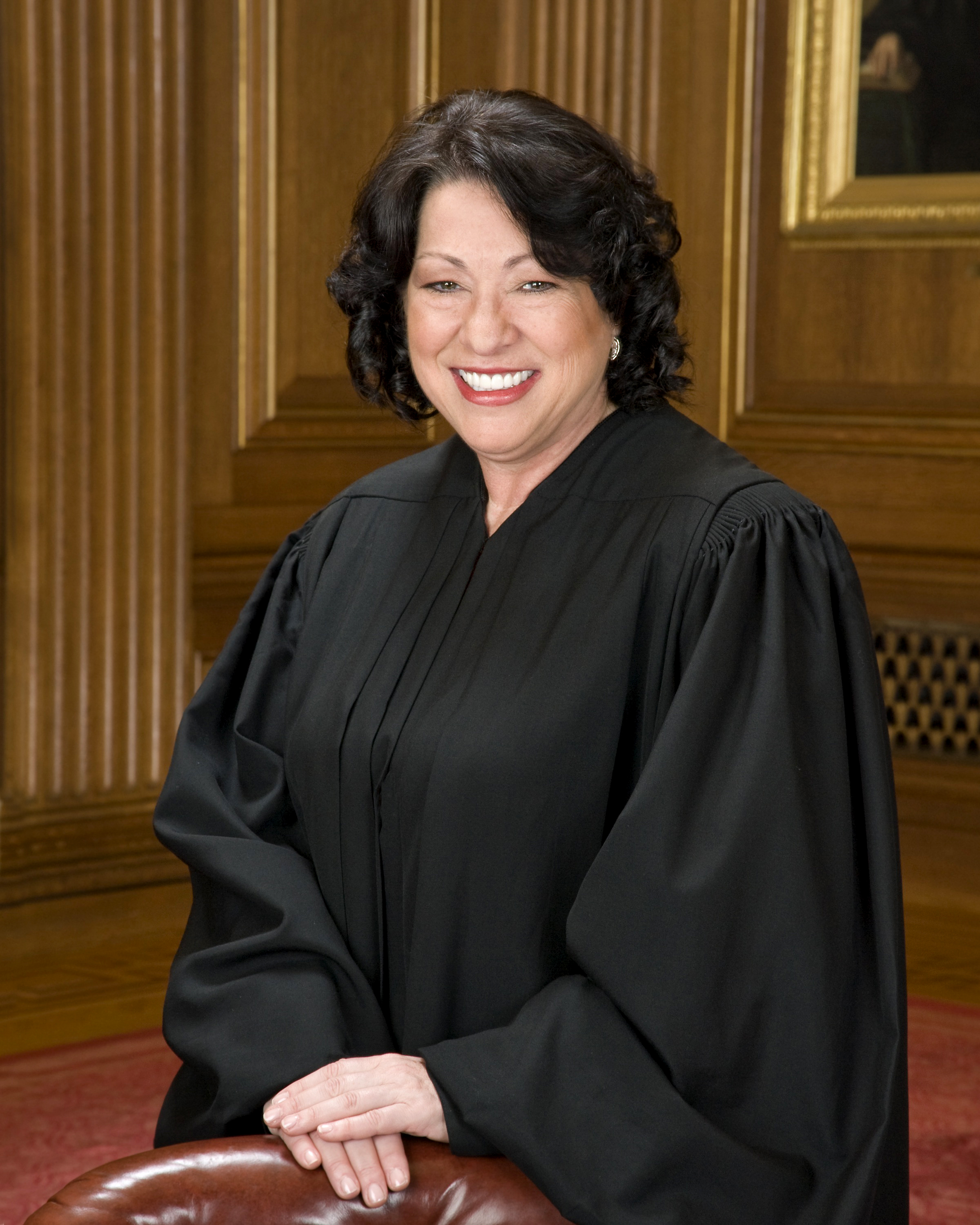

Sonia Sotomayor 2018 term statistics

7	Majority or plurality	3	Concurrence	7	Other
17	Dissent	1	Concurrence/dissent	Total =	35
Bench opinions = 19		Opinions relating to orders = 16		In-chambers opinions = 0
Unanimous opinions: 3		Most joined by: Ginsburg (13)		Least joined by: Thomas (4)

Type	Case	Citation	Issues	Joined by	Other opinions
	Apodaca v. Raemisch	586 U.S. ___ (2018)	Eighth Amendment • solitary confinement		
Sotomayor filed a statement respecting the Court's denial of certiorari.
	Zagorski v. Parker	586 U.S. ___ (2018)	Eighth Amendment • death penalty • lethal injection by midazolam	Breyer	
Sotomayor dissented from the Court's denial of application for stay of execution and certiorari.
	Brown v. United States	586 U.S. ___ (2018)	United States Federal Sentencing Guidelines • sentence enhancement for habitual offenders with violent crime convictions • vagueness doctrine	Ginsburg	
Sotomayor dissented from the Court's denial of certiorari.
	Townes v. Alabama	586 U.S. ___ (2018)	death penalty punishment • Fourteenth Amendment • Due Process Clause • jury instructions • prosecutorial burden of proof on each element of crime • failure to preserve audio record		
Sotomayor filed a statement respecting the Court's denial of certiorari.
	Zagorski v. Haslam	586 U.S. ___ (2018)	Eighth Amendment • death penalty • lethal injection by midazolam		
Sotomayor dissented from the Court's denial of application for stay of execution and certiorari.
	Reynolds v. Florida	586 U.S. ___ (2018)	Eighth Amendment • death penalty • jury instructions		Thomas; Breyer
Sotomayor dissented from the Court's denial of certiorari.
	Miller v. Parker	586 U.S. ___ (2018)	Eighth Amendment • death penalty • electric chair		
Sotomayor dissented from the Court's denial of application for stay of execution and certiorari.
	Lance v. Sellers	586 U.S. ___ (2019)	Eighth Amendment • death penalty • Sixth Amendment • ineffective assistance of counsel	Ginsburg, Kagan	
Sotomayor dissented from the Court's denial of certiorari.
	Stokeling v. United States	586 U.S. ___ (2019)	Armed Career Criminal Act • definition of "physical force"	Roberts, Ginsburg, Kagan	Thomas
	Schock v. United States	586 U.S. ___ (2019)	Article One • Rulemaking Clause		
Sotomayor filed a statement respecting the Court's denial of certiorari.
	Nutraceutical Corp. v. Lambert	586 U.S. ___ (2019)	deadline for appealing class action decertification • equitable tolling	Unanimous	
	Garza v. Idaho	586 U.S. ___ (2019)	Sixth Amendment • ineffective assistance of counsel • failure to file notice of appeal • waiver of right to appeal	Roberts, Ginsburg, Breyer, Kagan, Kavanaugh	Thomas
	Tharpe v. Ford	586 U.S. ___ (2019)	Sixth Amendment • racial bias of juror		
Sotomayor filed a statement respecting the Court's denial of certiorari.
	Obduskey v. McCarthy & Holthus LLP	586 U.S. ___ (2019)	Fair Debt Collection Practices Act • nonjudicial foreclosure proceedings		Breyer
	Sturgeon v. Frost	587 U.S. ___ (2019)	Alaska National Interest Lands Conservation Act • National Park Service regulatory authority over running river	Ginsburg	Kagan
	Biestek v. Berryhill	587 U.S. ___ (2019)	Social Security Administration claims process • effect of expert denying data request on evidentiary value of testimony		Kagan; Gorsuch
	Bucklew v. Precythe	587 U.S. ___ (2019)	Eighth Amendment • death penalty • challenges to method of execution		Gorsuch; Thomas; Kavanaugh; Breyer
	Lamps Plus, Inc. v. Varela	587 U.S. ___ (2019)	Federal Arbitration Act • contractual agreement to class action arbitration		Roberts; Thomas; Ginsburg; Breyer; Kagan
	Abdur'rahman v. Parker	587 U.S. ___ (2019)	Eighth Amendment • death penalty punishment • challenges to method of execution		
Sotomayor dissented from the Court's denial of certiorari.
	Herrera v. Wyoming	587 U.S. ___ (2019)	effect of statehood on Native American treaty rights	Ginsburg, Breyer, Kagan, Gorsuch	Alito
	Mission Product Holdings, Inc. v. Tempnology, LLC	587 U.S. ___ (2019)	bankruptcy law • Chapter 11 • debtor rejection of executory contract		Kagan; Gorsuch
	Nieves v. Bartlett	587 U.S. ___ (2019)	First Amendment • free speech • retaliatory arrest • Fourth Amendment • probable cause		Roberts; Thomas; Ginsburg; Gorsuch
	Smith v. Berryhill	587 U.S. ___ (2019)	judicial review of final decision by Social Security Administration	Unanimous	
	Mont v. United States	587 U.S. ___ (2019)	tolling of supervised release for new imprisonment • Sentencing Reform Act of 1984	Breyer, Kagan, Gorsuch	Thomas
	Return Mail, Inc. v. Postal Service	587 U.S. ___ (2019)	patent law • Leahy-Smith America Invents Act of 2011 • eligibility of federal government to initiate Patent Trial and Appeal Board post-patent issuance review	Roberts, Thomas, Alito, Gorsuch, Kavanaugh	Breyer
	Manhattan Community Access Corp. v. Halleck	587 U.S. ___ (2019)	First Amendment • public-access television • government-designated private entity as state actor	Ginsburg, Breyer, Kagan	Kavanaugh
	McDonough v. Smith	588 U.S. ___ (2019)	Section 1983 • prosecution based on false evidence • statute of limitations	Roberts, Ginsburg, Breyer, Alito, Kavanaugh	Thomas
	North Carolina Dept. of Revenue v. Kimberley Rice Kaestner 1992 Family Trust	588 U.S. ___ (2019)	Fourteenth Amendment • Due Process Clause • state taxation of trust based on beneficiary residence	Unanimous	Alito
	Iancu v. Brunetti	588 U.S. ___ (2019)	trademark law • Lanham Act • registration of immoral or scandalous trademarks • First Amendment • free speech	Breyer	Kagan; Alito; Roberts; Breyer
	Mitchell v. Wisconsin	588 U.S. ___ (2019)	Fourth Amendment • blood alcohol test taken from unconscious driver • exigent circumstances	Ginsburg, Kagan	Alito; Thomas; Gorsuch
	McGee v. McFadden	588 U.S. ___ (2019)	death penalty • Antiterrorism and Effective Death Penalty Act of 1996 • habeas corpus • certificate of appealability • withholding of exculpatory evidence		
Sotomayor dissented from the Court's denial of certiorari.
	Bowles v. Florida	588 U.S. ___ (2019)	Eighth Amendment • death penalty • execution of the intellectually disabled		
Sotomayor filed a statement respecting the Court's denial of certiorari.
	Crutsinger v. Davis	588 U.S. ___ (2019)	habeas corpus • Federal Rules of Civil Procedure • reopening of final judgment		
Sotomayor filed a statement respecting the Court's denial of certiorari.
	Barr v. East Bay Sanctuary Covenant	588 U.S. ___ (2019)	asylum policy • requirement to apply for asylum in other countries while traveling	Ginsburg	
Sotomayor dissented from the Court's grant of application for stay.
	Sparks v. Davis	588 U.S. ___ (2019)	death penalty • pro-death penalty attire worn by courtroom employee during sentencing		
Sotomayor filed a statement respecting the Court's denial of certiorari.
