= 2018 term United States Supreme Court opinions of Brett Kavanaugh =

The 2018 term of the Supreme Court of the United States began October 1, 2018, and concluded October 6, 2019. This was the first term of Associate Justice Brett Kavanaugh's tenure on the Court.
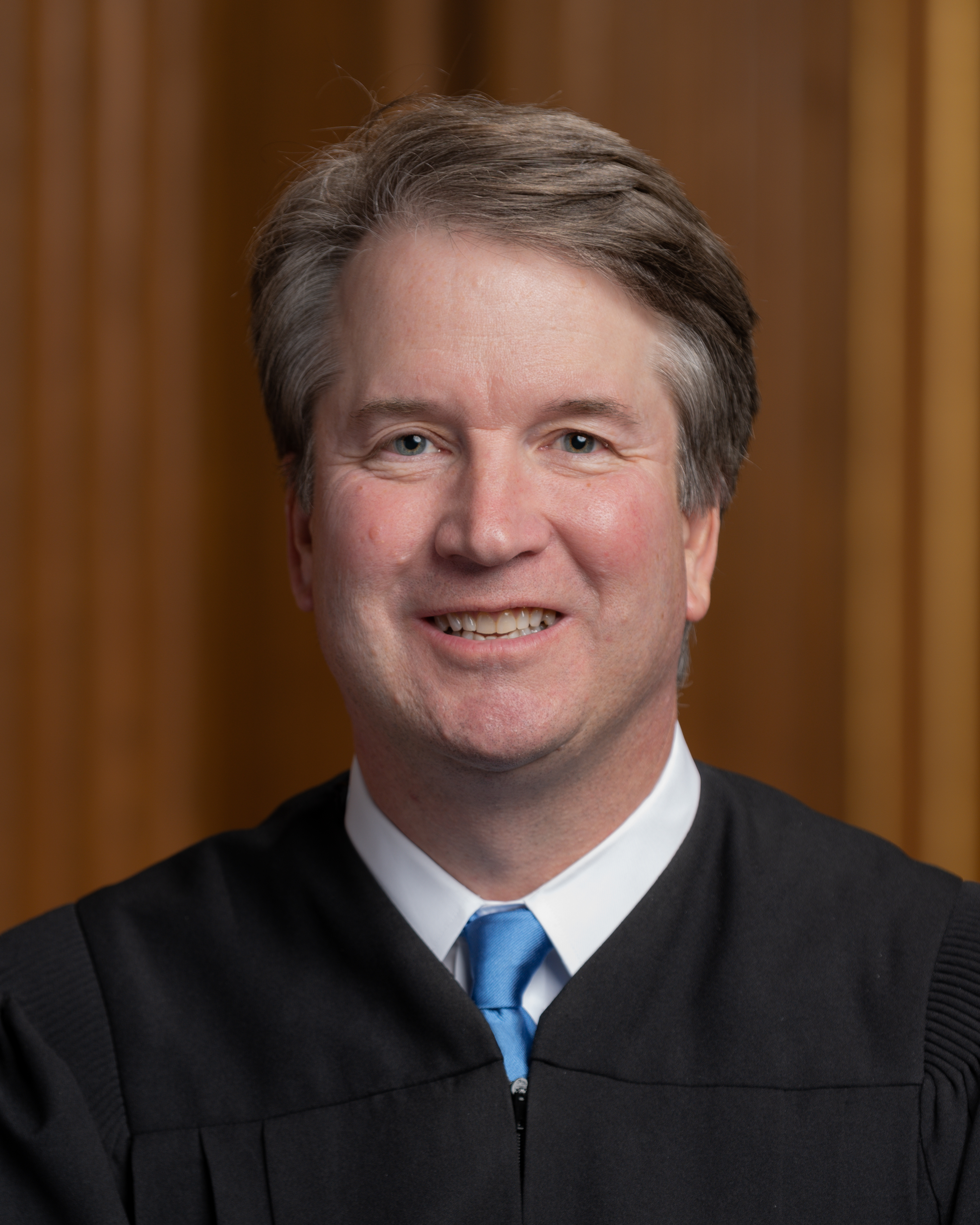

Brett Kavanaugh 2018 term statistics

7	Majority or plurality	6	Concurrence	2	Other
3	Dissent	0	Concurrence/dissent	Total =	18
Bench opinions = 14		Opinions relating to orders = 4		In-chambers opinions = 0
Unanimous opinions: 3		Most joined by: Alito (9)		Least joined by: Ginsburg, Breyer, Sotomayor, Kagan, Gorsuch (6)

Type	Case	Citation	Issues	Joined by	Other opinions
	Henry Schein, Inc. v. Archer & White Sales, Inc.	586 U.S. ___ (2019)	Federal Arbitration Act • determination of arbitrability	Unanimous	
	June Medical Services, L.L.C. v. Gee	586 U.S. ___ (2019)	abortion rights • requirement that providers have hospital admittance privileges • preenforcement facial challenge		
Kavanaugh dissented from the Court’s grant of application for stay.
	Rimini Street, Inc. v. Oracle USA, Inc.	586 U.S. ___ (2019)	copyright law • award of costs for infringement	Unanimous	
	Morris County Bd. of Chosen Freeholders v. Freedom From Religion Foundation	586 U.S. ___ (2019)	First Amendment • Establishment Clause • Free Exercise Clause • exclusion of religious buildings from state historic preservation funds	Alito, Gorsuch	
Kavanaugh filed a statement respecting the Court's denial of certiorari.
	Washington State Dept. of Licensing v. Cougar Den, Inc.	586 U.S. ___ (2019)	Yakama Nation Treaty of 1855 • state taxation of fuel importers	Thomas	Breyer; Gorsuch; Roberts
	Nielsen v. Preap	586 U.S. ___ (2019)	Illegal Immigration Reform and Immigrant Responsibility Act of 1996 • detention of aliens without bond for commission of certain crimes		Alito; Thomas; Breyer
	Air & Liquid Systems Corp. v. DeVries	586 U.S. ___ (2019)	maritime law • product liability • manufacturer duty to warn	Roberts, Ginsburg, Breyer, Sotomayor, Kagan	Gorsuch
	Murphy v. Collier	587 U.S. ___ (2019)	First Amendment • Establishment Clause • death penalty • choice of spiritual advisor at execution		
Kavanaugh concurred in the Court's grant of application for stay of execution.
	Murphy v. Collier	587 U.S. ___ (2019)	First Amendment • Establishment Clause • death penalty • choice of spiritual advisor at execution	Roberts	Alito
Kavanaugh filed a statement respecting the Court's grant of application for stay of execution.
	Bucklew v. Precythe	587 U.S. ___ (2019)	Eighth Amendment • death penalty • challenges to method of execution		Gorsuch; Thomas; Breyer; Sotomayor
	Apple, Inc. v. Pepper	587 U.S. ___ (2019)	antitrust law • monopolization of mobile app market • directness of purchase	Ginsburg, Breyer, Sotomayor, Kagan	Gorsuch
	Quarles v. United States	587 U.S. ___ (2019)	Armed Career Criminal Act • remaining-in burglary as violent felony	Unanimous	Thomas
	Manhattan Community Access Corp. v. Halleck	587 U.S. ___ (2019)	First Amendment • public-access television • government-designated private entity as state actor	Roberts, Thomas, Alito, Gorsuch	Sotomayor
	PDR Network, LLC v. Carlton Harris Chiropractic, Inc.	588 U.S. ___ (2019)	Telephone Consumer Protection Act of 1991 • unsolicited advertisement by fax • Administrative Orders Review Act	Thomas, Alito, Gorsuch	Breyer; Thomas
	American Legion v. American Humanist Assn.	588 U.S. ___ (2019)	First Amendment • Establishment Clause • cross as public war memorial		Alito; Thomas; Breyer; Kagan; Gorsuch; Ginsburg
	Flowers v. Mississippi	588 U.S. ___ (2019)	jury selection • racially motivated peremptory strike	Roberts, Ginsburg, Breyer, Alito, Sotomayor, Kagan	Alito; Thomas
	United States v. Davis	588 U.S. ___ (2019)	federal criminal law • sentence enhancement for use of firearm during crime of violence • vagueness doctrine	Thomas, Alito; Roberts (in part)	Gorsuch
	Kisor v. Wilkie	588 U.S. ___ (2019)	administrative law • deference to agency interpretation of ambiguous regulation	Alito	Kagan; Roberts; Gorsuch
