= 2018 term United States Supreme Court opinions of Elena Kagan =

The 2018 term of the Supreme Court of the United States began October 1, 2018, and concluded October 6, 2019. This was the ninth term of Associate Justice Elena Kagan's tenure on the Court.
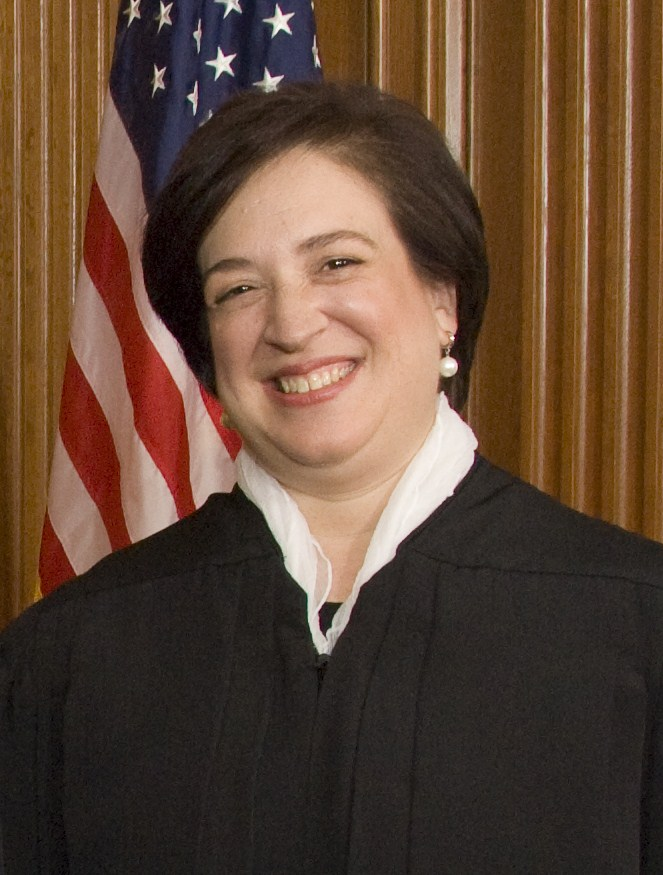

Elena Kagan 2018 term statistics

8	Majority or plurality	1	Concurrence	0	Other
4	Dissent	0	Concurrence/dissent	Total =	13
Bench opinions = 12		Opinions relating to orders = 1		In-chambers opinions = 0
Unanimous opinions: 2		Most joined by: Ginsburg, Breyer (11)		Least joined by: Gorsuch (3)

Type	Case	Citation	Issues	Joined by	Other opinions
	Dunn v. Ray	586 U.S. ___ (2019)	First Amendment • Establishment Clause • death penalty • choice of spiritual advisor at execution	Ginsburg, Breyer, Sotomayor	
Kagan dissented from the Court's grant of application to vacate stay of execution.
	Madison v. Alabama	586 U.S. ___ (2019)	Eighth Amendment • death penalty • mental competence at time of execution • amnesia	Roberts, Ginsburg, Breyer, Sotomayor	Alito
	Sturgeon v. Frost	587 U.S. ___ (2019)	Alaska National Interest Lands Conservation Act • National Park Service regulatory authority over running river	Unanimous	Sotomayor
	Biestek v. Berryhill	587 U.S. ___ (2019)	Social Security Administration claims process • effect of expert denying data request on evidentiary value of testimony	Roberts, Thomas, Breyer, Alito, Kavanaugh	Sotomayor; Gorsuch
	Lamps Plus, Inc. v. Varela	587 U.S. ___ (2019)	Federal Arbitration Act • contractual agreement to class action arbitration	Ginsburg, Breyer; Sotomayor (in part)	Roberts; Thomas; Ginsburg; Breyer; Sotomayor
	Thacker v. TVA	587 U.S. ___ (2019)	Tennessee Valley Authority • Federal Tort Claims Act • sovereign immunity	Unanimous	
	Mission Product Holdings, Inc. v. Tempnology, LLC	587 U.S. ___ (2019)	bankruptcy law • Chapter 11 • debtor rejection of executory contract	Roberts, Thomas, Ginsburg, Breyer, Alito, Sotomayor, Kavanaugh	Sotomayor; Gorsuch
	American Legion v. American Humanist Assn.	588 U.S. ___ (2019)	First Amendment • Establishment Clause • cross as public war memorial		Alito; Thomas; Breyer; Gorsuch; Kavanaugh; Ginsburg
	Gundy v. United States	588 U.S. ___ (2019)	Sex Offender Registration and Notification Act • authority of Attorney General to determine pre-act offender registration requirements • Article I • nondelegation doctrine	Ginsburg, Breyer, Sotomayor	Alito; Gorsuch
	Knick v. Township of Scott	588 U.S. ___ (2019)	Fifth Amendment • Takings Clause • state court exhaustion of remedies	Ginsburg, Breyer, Sotomayor	Roberts; Thomas
	Iancu v. Brunetti	588 U.S. ___ (2019)	trademark law • Lanham Act • registration of immoral or scandalous trademarks • First Amendment • free speech	Thomas, Ginsburg, Alito, Gorsuch, Kavanaugh	Alito; Roberts; Breyer; Sotomayor
	Kisor v. Wilkie	588 U.S. ___ (2019)	administrative law • deference to agency interpretation of ambiguous regulation • separation of powers • Administrative Procedures Act	Ginsburg, Breyer, Sotomayor; Roberts (in part)	Roberts; Gorsuch; Kavanaugh
	Rucho v. Common Cause	588 U.S. ___ (2019)	legislative redistricting • partisan gerrymandering • political question doctrine • Article I • Elections Clause • First Amendment • Fourteenth Amendment • Equal Protection Clause	Ginsburg, Breyer, Sotomayor	Roberts
