= 2018 term United States Supreme Court opinions of Ruth Bader Ginsburg =

The 2018 term of the Supreme Court of the United States began October 1, 2018, and concluded October 6, 2019. This was the twenty-sixth term of Associate Justice Ruth Bader Ginsburg's tenure on the Court.
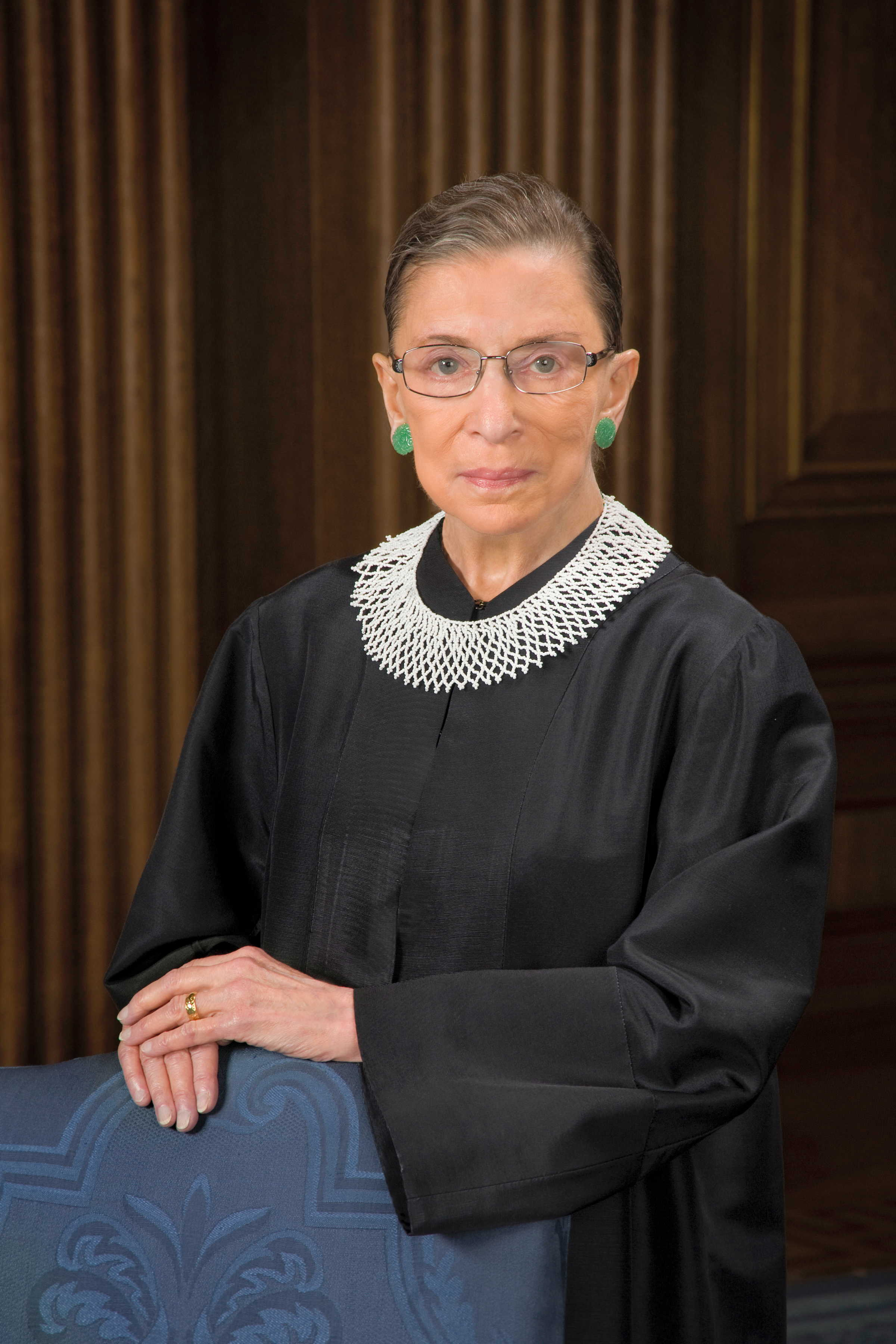

Ruth Bader Ginsburg 2018 term statistics

6	Majority or plurality	2	Concurrence	0	Other
5	Dissent	2	Concurrence/dissent	Total =	15
Bench opinions = 14		Opinions relating to orders = 1		In-chambers opinions = 0
Unanimous opinions: 2		Most joined by: Sotomayor (10)		Least joined by: Thomas, Kavanaugh (4)

Type	Case	Citation	Issues	Joined by	Other opinions
	Brakebill v. Jaeger	586 U.S. ___ (2018)	voter identification laws	Kagan	
Ginsburg dissented from the Court's denial of an application to vacate a stay.
	Mount Lemmon Fire Dist. v. Guido	586 U.S. ___ (2018)	Age Discrimination in Employment Act of 1967 • application to political subdivisions	Roberts, Thomas, Breyer, Alito, Sotomayor, Kagan, Gorsuch	
	New Prime Inc. v. Oliveira	586 U.S. ___ (2019)	Federal Arbitration Act • exclusion of contracts of employment for certain transportation workers		Gorsuch
	Timbs v. Indiana	586 U.S. ___ (2019)	Eighth Amendment • excessive fines • Fourteenth Amendment • Due Process Clause • Incorporation Doctrine • civil forfeiture	Roberts, Breyer, Alito, Sotomayor, Kagan, Gorsuch, Kavanaugh	Thomas; Gorsuch
	Fourth Estate Pub. Benefit Corp. v. Wall-Street.com	586 U.S. ___ (2019)	copyright law • registration requirement for infringement lawsuit	Unanimous	
	BNSF R. Co. v. Loos	586 U.S. ___ (2019)	Federal Employers' Liability Act • Railroad Retirement Tax Act • tax status of damages for lost wages due to injury	Roberts, Breyer, Alito, Sotomayor, Kagan, Kavanaugh	Gorsuch
	Lamps Plus, Inc. v. Varela	587 U.S. ___ (2019)	Federal Arbitration Act • contractual agreement to class action arbitration	Breyer, Sotomayor	Roberts; Thomas; Breyer; Sotomayor; Kagan
	Nieves v. Bartlett	587 U.S. ___ (2019)	First Amendment • free speech • retaliatory arrest • Fourth Amendment • probable cause		Roberts; Thomas; Gorsuch; Sotomayor
	Box v. Planned Parenthood of Indiana and Kentucky, Inc.	587 U.S. ___ (2019)	abortion rights • standard of review		per curiam; Thomas
	Fort Bend County v. Davis	587 U.S. ___ (2019)	Title VII • requirement to file charge with EEOC	Unanimous	
	Virginia House of Delegates v. Bethune-Hill	587 U.S. ___ (2019)	Article III • standing of single chamber of bicameral legislature • legislative redistricting	Thomas, Sotomayor, Kagan, Gorsuch	Alito
	Gamble v. United States	587 U.S. ___ (2019)	Fifth Amendment • Double Jeopardy Clause • dual sovereignty doctrine		Alito; Thomas; Gorsuch
	Virginia Uranium, Inc. v. Warren	587 U.S. ___ (2019)	Atomic Energy Act • federal preemption of state uranium mining laws	Sotomayor, Kagan	Gorsuch; Roberts
	American Legion v. American Humanist Assn.	588 U.S. ___ (2019)	First Amendment • Establishment Clause • cross as public war memorial	Sotomayor	Alito; Thomas; Breyer; Kagan; Gorsuch; Kavanaugh
	Dutra Group v. Batterton	588 U.S. ___ (2019)	admiralty law • unseaworthiness • punitive damages	Breyer, Sotomayor	Alito
