= 2018 term United States Supreme Court opinions of John Roberts =

The 2018 term of the Supreme Court of the United States began October 1, 2018, and concluded October 6, 2019. This was the fourteenth term of Chief Justice John Roberts's tenure on the Court.
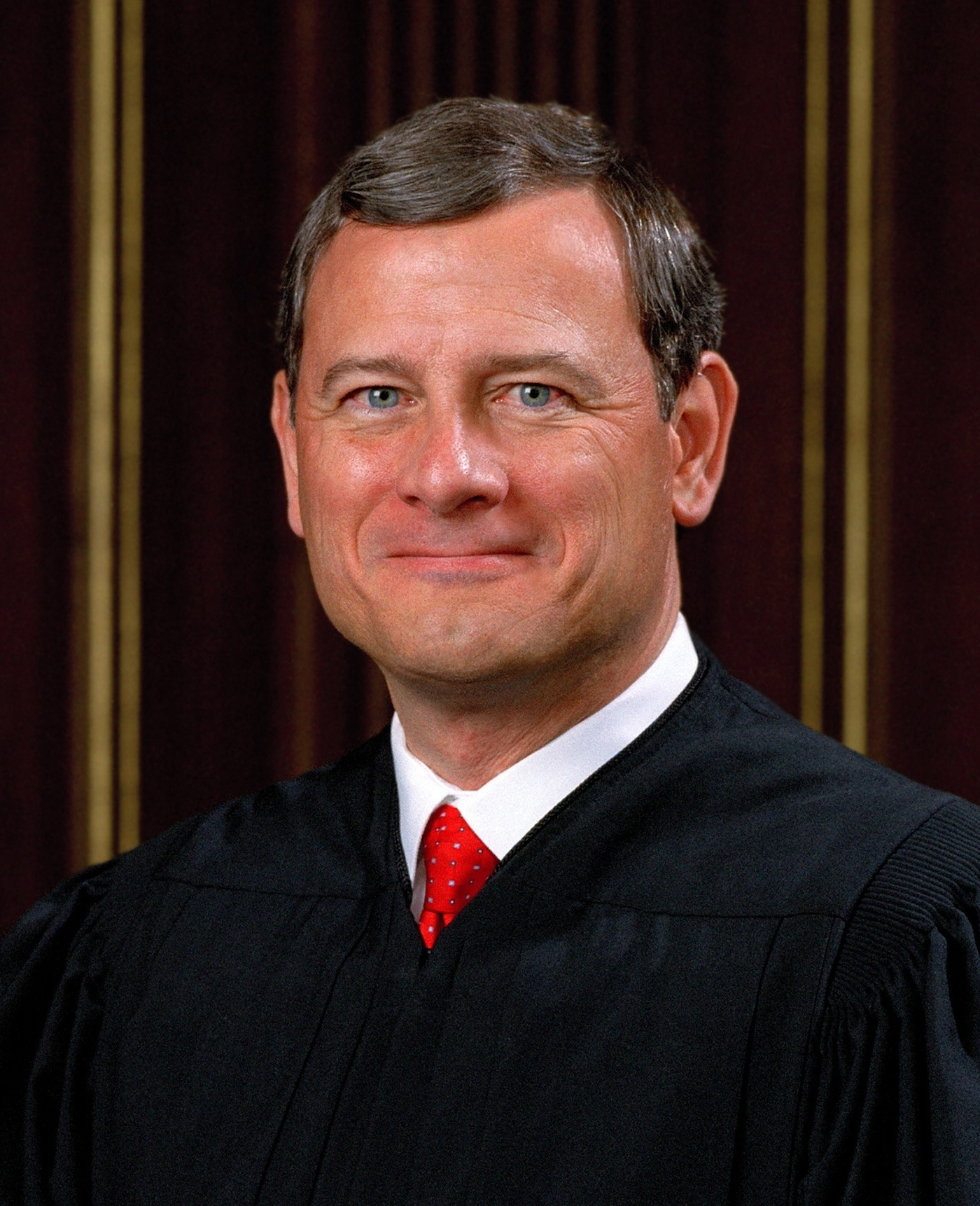

John Roberts 2018 term statistics

| 7 | Majority or plurality | 2 | Concurrence | 0 | Other |
| 3 | Dissent | 1 | Concurrence/dissent | Total = | 13 |
| Bench opinions = 12 | | Opinions relating to orders = 1 | | In-chambers opinions = 0 |
| Unanimous opinions: 0 | | Most joined by: Alito (9 in full, 1 in part) | | Least joined by: Ginsburg, Sotomayor (2 in full, 1 in part) |

| Type | Case | Citation | Issues | Joined by | Other opinions |
|---|---|---|---|---|---|
| | Weyerhaeuser Co. v. United States Fish and Wildlife Serv. | 586 U.S. ___ (2018) | Endangered Species Act of 1973 • designation of critical habitat | Thomas, Ginsburg, Breyer, Alito, Sotomayor, Kagan, Gorsuch | |
Kavanaugh did not participate.
| | Moore v. Texas | 586 U.S. ___ (2019) | Eighth Amendment to the United States Constitution • death penalty • execution of the intellectually disabled | | per curiam; Alito |
| | Jam v. International Finance Corp. | 586 U.S. ___ (2019) | International Organizations Immunities Act • relationship to Foreign Sovereign Immunities Act | Thomas, Ginsburg, Alito, Sotomayor, Kagan, Gorsuch | Breyer |
Kavanaugh did not participate.
| | Washington State Dept. of Licensing v. Cougar Den, Inc. | 586 U.S. ___ (2019) | Yakama Nation Treaty of 1855 • state taxation of fuel importers | Thomas, Alito, Kavanaugh | Breyer; Gorsuch; Kavanaugh |
| | Lamps Plus, Inc. v. Varela | 587 U.S. ___ (2019) | Federal Arbitration Act • contractual agreement to class action arbitration | Thomas, Alito, Gorsuch, Kavanaugh | Thomas; Ginsburg; Breyer; Sotomayor; Kagan |
| | Myers v. United States | 587 U.S. ___ (2019) | Armed Career Criminal Act • "violent felony" classification | Thomas, Alito, Kavanaugh | |
Roberts dissented from the Court's grant of certiorari, summary vacatur, and remand.
| | Nieves v. Bartlett | 587 U.S. ___ (2019) | First Amendment • free speech • retaliatory arrest • Fourth Amendment • probable cause | Breyer, Alito, Kagan, Kavanaugh; Thomas (in part) | Thomas; Ginsburg; Gorsuch; Sotomayor |
| | Virginia Uranium, Inc. v. Warren | 587 U.S. ___ (2019) | Atomic Energy Act • federal preemption of state uranium mining laws | Breyer, Alito | Gorsuch; Ginsburg |
| | Knick v. Township of Scott | 588 U.S. ___ (2019) | Fifth Amendment • Takings Clause • state court exhaustion of remedies | Thomas, Alito, Gorsuch, Kavanaugh | Thomas; Kagan |
| | Iancu v. Brunetti | 588 U.S. ___ (2019) | trademark law • Lanham Act • registration of immoral or scandalous trademarks • First Amendment • free speech | | Kagan; Alito; Breyer; Sotomayor |
| | Kisor v. Wilkie | 588 U.S. ___ (2019) | administrative law • deference to agency interpretation of ambiguous regulation | | Kagan; Gorsuch; Kavanaugh |
| | Rucho v. Common Cause | 588 U.S. ___ (2019) | legislative redistricting • partisan gerrymandering • political question doctrine • Article I • Elections Clause • First Amendment • Fourteenth Amendment • Equal Protection Clause | Thomas, Alito, Gorsuch, Kavanaugh | Kagan |
Federal courts do not have the jurisdiction to hear partisan gerrymandering cases because they are nonjusticiable political questions.
| | Department of Commerce v. New York | 588 U.S. ___ (2019) | addition of citizenship question to 2020 United States census • Article I • Enumeration Clause • Administrative Procedures Act • Article III • standing | Thomas, Ginsburg, Breyer, Alito, Sotomayor, Kagan, Gorsuch, Kavanaugh (in part) | Thomas; Breyer; Alito |
Because the reason it made the decision was pretextual and not related to the actual purpose, the Department of Commerce cannot add a citizenship question to the 2020 Census.
