= Brigham City (disambiguation) =

Brigham City, Utah, is a city in Box Elder County, Utah, United States.

Brigham City may also refer to:

- Brigham City, Arizona, a ghost town and historic monument in Arizona
- Brigham City (film), by Richard Dutcher
- Brigham City v. Stuart, a U.S. Supreme Court case involving right to privacy
