= Brigham City v. Stuart =

- Supreme Court of the United States

Argued April 24, 2006 Decided May 22, 2006
- Full case name: Brigham City, Utah v. Charles W. Stuart, Shayne R. Taylor and Sandra A. Taylor
- Docket no.: 05-502
- Citations: 547 U.S. 398 (more) 126 S. Ct. 1943; 164 L. Ed. 2d 650; 2006 U.S. LEXIS 4155

Case history
- Prior: Motion to suppress granted, Brigham City District Court; affirmed, 57 P.3d 1111 (Utah Ct. App. 2002); affirmed, 122 P.3d 506 (Utah 2004)

Holding
- Police may enter a home without a warrant when they have an objectively reasonable basis for believing that an occupant is seriously injured or imminently threatened with such injury.

Court membership
- Chief Justice John Roberts Associate Justices John P. Stevens · Antonin Scalia; Anthony Kennedy · David Souter; Clarence Thomas · Ruth Bader Ginsburg; Stephen Breyer · Samuel Alito

Case opinions
- Majority: Roberts, joined by unanimous
- Concurrence: Stevens

Laws applied
- U.S. Const. amend. IV

Brigham City v. Stuart, 547 U.S. 398 (2006), is a United States Supreme Court case involving the exigent circumstances exception to the Fourth Amendment's warrant requirement. The Court ruled that police may enter a home without a warrant if they have an objectively reasonable basis for believing that an occupant is or is about to be seriously injured.

The case involved the arrest of four adults seen restraining a juvenile, who punched one of the adults who was restraining him. The trial court granted the defendants' motion to dismiss, arguing that the warrantless entry was not supported by exigent circumstances; the Utah Court of Appeals and Utah Supreme Court both affirmed the trial court's ruling. However, the U.S. Supreme Court reversed and remanded the case on May 22, 2006.

== Background ==
On July 23, 2001, at about 3:00 AM, four Brigham City police officers were dispatched to a loud house party. At the front door, the officers determined that knocking would not be productive and made their way down the driveway alongside the house to investigate. Through a slat fence they saw two minors drinking and entered the backyard, having probable cause to do so. While in the backyard, the officers saw a fight inside the house, which appeared to be four adults restraining a juvenile. At one point, the juvenile broke free and struck one of the occupants of the house in the nose with his hand.

Two officers opened the screen door and "hollered" to identify themselves, but the occupants didn't notice. After entering the house, one officer shouted again to identify himself, this time alerting the occupants. The occupants then became upset at the presence of the officers in the residence without permission. The officers arrested the adults and charged them with contributing to the delinquency of a minor, disorderly conduct, and intoxication. The defendants filed a motion to suppress with the trial court. The trial court sided with the defendants, and the city twice appealed to the Utah Court of Appeals and the Utah Supreme Court, which both affirmed the trial court's ruling.

== Opinion of the Court ==
The Supreme Court reversed the decision of the Utah Supreme Court, in a unanimous opinion delivered by Chief Justice John Roberts. Justice John Paul Stevens delivered a separate concurring opinion.

=== Exigency ===
The Court ruled that the officers' warrantless entry into the home was justified under the emergency aid exception to getting a warrant because their entry "was plainly reasonable under the circumstances." In ruling the officers' entry was supported by exigency, the Court cited Mincey v. Arizona, 437 U.S. 385 (1978), 393–394:

[W]arrants are generally required to search a person’s home or his person unless 'the exigencies of the situation' make the needs of law enforcement so compelling that the warrantless search is objectively reasonable under the Fourth Amendment." ... One exigency obviating the requirement of a warrant is the need to assist persons who are seriously injured or threatened with such injury. ... Accordingly, law enforcement officers may enter a home without a warrant to render emergency assistance to an injured occupant or to protect an occupant from imminent injury. Mincey, supra, at 392; see also Georgia v. Randolph, 547

The court found that "the officers had an objectively reasonable basis for believing both that the injured adult might need help and that the violence in the kitchen was just beginning."

=== "Knock and announce" rule ===
The Court found that "the manner of the officers' entry was also reasonable." The court found that after seeing the punch, one officer opened the screen door to the kitchen and yelled in "police." Upon nobody hearing him, he stepped into the kitchen and then announced himself again, which prompted the tumult to subside. The Court ruled that:

...the officer's announcement of his presence was at least equivalent to a knock on the screen door. Indeed, it was probably the only option that had even a chance of rising above the din. Under these circumstances, there was no violation of the Fourth Amendment’s knock-and-announce rule.

Also, the Court ruled that once the officers announced their presence, they were free to enter the house to deal with the tumult, as it would be pointless to stand at the door waiting for a response while people brawled inside.
