= Garza v. Idaho =

- Supreme Court of the United States

Argued October 30, 2018 Decided February 27, 2019
- Full case name: Gilberto Garza, Jr., Petitioner, v. State of Idaho, Respondent.
- Docket no.: 17-1026
- Citations: 586 U.S. ___ (more) 139 S. Ct. 738
- Argument: Oral argument

Holding
- The presumption of prejudice as recognized in Roe v. Flores-Ortega applies regardless of whether a defendant has waived the right to appeal.

Court membership
- Chief Justice John Roberts Associate Justices Clarence Thomas · Ruth Bader Ginsburg; Stephen Breyer · Samuel Alito; Sonia Sotomayor · Elena Kagan; Neil Gorsuch · Brett Kavanaugh

Case opinions
- Majority: Sotomayor, joined by Roberts, Ginsburg, Breyer, Kagan, Kavanaugh
- Dissent: Thomas, joined by Gorsuch; Alito (Parts I and II)

Laws applied
- U.S. Const. Amend. VI

Garza v. Idaho, 586 U.S. 232, 139 S. Ct. 738 (2019), was a case in which the United States Supreme Court held that the presumption of prejudice for Sixth Amendment purposes applies regardless of whether a defendant has waived the right to appeal.

== Background ==
In 2015, petitioner Gilberto Garza, Jr. signed two plea agreements which required him to waive his right to appeal. After sentencing, Garza informed his trial counsel of his wish to appeal. Due to the appeal waivers signed by Garza, counsel declined to file a notice of appeal. After the time period to file an appeal lapsed, Garza filed a petition for state post-conviction relief on the basis of ineffective assistance of counsel. The trial court denied relief and the Idaho Court of Appeals affirmed. The Idaho Supreme Court affirmed, concluding that the presumption of prejudice as recognized in Roe v. Flores-Ortega does not apply when the defendant has agreed to waive the right to appeal.

== Opinion ==
Amir Ali presented oral argument for Garza before the Supreme Court, with Ken Jorgensen and Alon Kedem representing the State of Idaho and United States, respectively. The Court announced its judgment in favor of the petitioner on February 27, 2019, with the court reversing and remanding by a vote of 6–3.

=== Opinion of the Court ===
The majority opinion, written by Sotomayor and joined by Roberts, Ginsburg, Breyer, Kagan, and Kavanaugh, held that Garza's trial counsel rendered ineffective assistance. In Strickland v. Washington, the Supreme Court held that a defendant claiming ineffective assistance of counsel must prove counsel's representation fell below an objective standard of reasonableness and such deficiency was prejudicial to the defense.

=== Dissent ===
Justice Thomas, joined by Gorsuch and joined in part by Alito, filed a dissenting opinion which held that the defense acted reasonably by refusing to file an appeal. The dissent argued that the majority's opinion creates a "defendant-always-wins" rule that has no basis in previous case law or the Sixth Amendment. Part III of Thomas's dissent, joined by Gorsuch but not Alito, suggests the landmark Gideon v. Wainwright (1963, guaranteeing poor defendants a right to a lawyer in state criminal cases) was wrongly decided and should be overruled.
