= Rehaif v. United States =

- Supreme Court of the United States

Argued April 23, 2019 Decided June 21, 2019
- Full case name: Hamid Mohamed Rehaif, Petitioner v. United States
- Docket no.: 17-9560
- Citations: 588 U.S. 225 (more) 139 S. Ct. 2191; 204 L. Ed. 2d 594

Case history
- Prior: United States v. Rehaif, 868 F.3d 907 (11th Cir. 2017); vacated, 888 F.3d 1138 (11th Cir. 2018); cert. granted, 139 S. Ct. 914 (2019).

Holding
- In a prosecution under 18 USC § 922(g) and § 924(a)(2), the Government must prove both that the defendant knew he possessed a firearm and that he knew he belonged to the relevant category of persons barred from possessing a firearm.

Court membership
- Chief Justice John Roberts Associate Justices Clarence Thomas · Ruth Bader Ginsburg; Stephen Breyer · Samuel Alito; Sonia Sotomayor · Elena Kagan; Neil Gorsuch · Brett Kavanaugh

Case opinions
- Majority: Breyer, joined by Roberts, Ginsburg, Sotomayor, Kagan, Gorsuch, Kavanaugh
- Dissent: Alito, joined by Thomas

Laws applied
- 18 U.S.C. § 922(g), 18 U.S.C. § 924(a)(2)

Rehaif v. United States, 588 U.S. 225 (2019), was a case before the United States Supreme Court dealing with mens rea. The Court held that when a person is charged with possessing a gun while prohibited from doing so under 18 U.S.C. § 922(g), the prosecution must prove both that the accused knew that they possessed a gun and that they knew they held the relevant status.

== Legal background ==
In 1996, Congress passed the Brady Handgun Violence Prevention Act. Its provisions included 18 USC § 922(g), which specified many classes of so-called "prohibited persons" who were forbidden to possess a firearm. 18 U.S.C. § 924(a)(2) further stated that "...whoever knowingly violates subsection...(g)...of title 922 shall be " (emphasis added). The Courts of Appeals repeatedly interpreted this statute as requiring the prosecution to prove only that the accused knew he possessed a gun, not that he knew he was a prohibited person.

== Case background ==
Hamid Mohamed Ahmed Ali Rehaif, a citizen of the United Arab Emirates, was admitted to the United States on an F-1 visa to study at the Florida Institute of Technology. In December 2014 the Institute dismissed him for failing or withdrawing from all of his classes, and in February 2015 his visa was revoked. However, Rehaif remained in the country. He began a curious ritual where he would check into a hotel each evening, requesting a room on the 8th floor facing the Melbourne Orlando International Airport, then would check out the next morning and pay his bill in cash. All the while he frequented a firing range, where he would rent guns and purchase ammunition.

After 53 days of this routine, a hotel employee notified the Federal Bureau of Investigation that Rehaif had claimed to have weapons in his room. When questioned, Rehaif admitted to shooting firearms at the shooting range. A search of his room revealed the remainder of the ammunition he possessed. Rehaif was charged with possessing a gun while illegally or unlawfully in the United States, in violation of §922(g)(5)(A).

=== Lower court proceedings ===
Rehaif was tried in the United States District Court for the Middle District of Florida. The prosecution requested a jury instruction that "[t]he United States is not required to prove that the defendant knew that he was illegally or unlawfully in the United States". Rehaif objected, claiming that the United States was required to prove that he knew his status. The judge overruled this objection, and Rehaif was convicted. He appealed his case to the Eleventh Circuit, which rejected his arguments and affirmed the District Court's judgment under circuit precedent that proof of knowledge of status is not required.

== Supreme Court ==
Rehaif petitioned the Supreme Court for writ of certiorari. On January 11, 2019 the Court agreed to hear his case. Oral arguments were held on April 23, 2019, with Rosemary Cakmis arguing for Rehaif and Allon Kedem arguing for the United States. During arguments, Justice Gorsuch referenced a case around the same issue that he had heard while on the Tenth Circuit, United States v. Games-Perez: "As you well know, I had a case where the fellow was told by the judge that he was not a felon when he was convicted. And yet he was put in jail for 10 years afterwards because the government didn't have to prove that he knew his status." Justice Ginsburg seemed concerned about the ramifications of reversal, and whether the thousands of people convicted under the statute would be eligible to seek habeas corpus relief.

=== Opinion of the court ===
The court released its opinion on June 21, 2019. In a 7–2 vote, they reversed Rehaif's conviction.

Justice Breyer, joined by six other Justices, held that the government must prove both that the accused knew he possessed a gun and that he knew he held the relevant status. Although the Court had previously held that knowledge of status was not required for certain crimes, for example in United States v. X-Citement Video, Inc., the conduct was inherently immoral or suspect. Gun possession, on the other hand, is not merely innocent but constitutionally protected in some cases. Therefore, knowledge of the prohibited status is part of mens rea and must be proved by the prosecution.

Justice Alito, joined by Justice Thomas, filed a lengthy dissenting opinion. He took issue with the majority applying the law to a theoretical sympathetic defendant, rather than Rehaif whom he characterized as suspicious.
