= Food Marketing Institute v. Argus Leader Media =

- Supreme Court of the United States

Decided June 24, 2019
- Full case name: Food Marketing Institute v. Argus Leader Media
- Docket no.: 18-481
- Citations: 588 U.S. ___ (more)

Holding
- Where commercial or financial information is both customarily and actually treated as private by its owner and provided to the government under an assurance of privacy, the information is "confidential" within the meaning of the Freedom of Information Act.

Court membership
- Chief Justice John Roberts Associate Justices Clarence Thomas · Ruth Bader Ginsburg; Stephen Breyer · Samuel Alito; Sonia Sotomayor · Elena Kagan; Neil Gorsuch · Brett Kavanaugh

Case opinions
- Majority: Gorsuch
- Dissent: Breyer, joined by Ginsberg, Sotomayor

Laws applied
- Freedom of Information Act

Food Marketing Institute v. Argus Leader Media, 588 U.S. ___ (2019), was a United States Supreme Court case in which the Court held that, where commercial or financial information is both customarily and actually treated as private by its owner and provided to the government under an assurance of privacy, the information is "confidential" within the meaning of the Freedom of Information Act.

== Background ==
Argus Leader (a newspaper) filed a Freedom of Information Act (FOIA) request with the Department of Agriculture (USDA) for detailed, store-specific data about transactions in the national food-stamp program (SNAP). The USDA refused to release the information, citing FOIA's Exemption 4, which protects "confidential" commercial or financial information obtained from a person or business.

Following existing precedent, the lower courts applied a "competitive harm" test, which required the information holder to show that disclosure would cause substantial competitive harm. The courts found this high standard was not met and ordered the data released.

On appeal, the Food Marketing Institute, representing grocery stores, argued that this judicially-created "substantial competitive harm" test was too strict and did not align with the ordinary meaning of the word "confidential" in the statute. Both the District Court and the Eighth Circuit Court of Appeals rejected this argument, upholding the disclosure order.

== Supreme Court ==
=== Decision ===
First, the Supreme Court found that the Food Marketing Institute had standing to pursue an appeal. As a trade association of grocery stores whose members were the direct sources of the contested SNAP data, FMI established the three requirements for standing:

1. A concrete injury: the imminent disclosure of its members' commercial information
2. Traceability: the injury resulted from the lower court's order
3. Redressability: a Supreme Court reversal of the court below would prevent the disclosure

The Supreme Court, having established jurisdiction, turned to interpreting the term "confidential" in FOIA's Exemption 4, which protects from mandatory disclosure "commercial or financial information obtained from a person and privileged or confidential." Since FOIA does not define the term, the Court looked to its ordinary meaning at the time of the statute's enactment in 1966. The Court found that the data being requested was "confidential".

The Court rejected the lower courts' "substantial competitive harm" test, finding it had no basis in the statute. The Court strongly criticized the lower court's methodology, emphasizing that judges must start and stop with the ordinary meaning of clear statutory text.

=== Breyer's dissent ===
Justice Breyer argues that Exemption 4's purpose is to protect businesses from the specific economic or business injury that would result from the government disclosing their private commercial data. Breyer says the majority's test is too broad and inconsistent with FOIA's core purpose. He notes the risk of abuse where the public is denied access to information due to mere "convenience, skittishness, or bureaucratic inertia." Breyer would remand the case to the lower court to determine if the SNAP data's release would cause genuine harm.
