= Madison v. Alabama =

- Supreme Court of the United States

Argued October 2, 2018 Decided February 27, 2019
- Full case name: Vernon Madison, Petitioner v. Alabama
- Docket no.: 17-7505
- Citations: 586 U.S. 265 (more) 139 S. Ct. 718; 203 L. Ed. 2d 103

Case history
- Prior: Petition denied, sub nom. Madison v. Commissioner, Ala. Dept. of Corrections; rev'd in part, remanded, 677 F.3d 1333 (11th Cir. 2012); cert. denied, sub nom. Thomas v. Madison, 568 U.S. 1019 (2012); petition denied, sub nom. Madison v. Commissioner, Ala. Dept. of Corrections; aff'd, 761 F.3d 1240 (11th Cir. 2014); cert. denied, sub nom. Madison v. Thomas, 135 S. St. 1562 (2015); rehearing denied, 135 S. Ct. 2346 (2015); petition denied, S.D. Ala., May 10, 2016; rev'd, 851 F.3d 1173 (11th Cir. 2017); reversed sub. nom., Dunn v. Madison, 138 S. Ct. 9 (2017); remanded, 879 F.3d 1298 (11th Cir. 2018); cert. granted, 138 S. Ct. 1172 (2018).

Holding
- The Eighth Amendment may permit executing a prisoner even if he or she cannot remember committing his or her crime, but it may prohibit executing a prisoner who suffers from dementia or another disorder, rather than psychotic delusions.

Court membership
- Chief Justice John Roberts Associate Justices Clarence Thomas · Ruth Bader Ginsburg; Stephen Breyer · Samuel Alito; Sonia Sotomayor · Elena Kagan; Neil Gorsuch · Brett Kavanaugh

Case opinions
- Majority: Kagan, joined by Roberts, Ginsburg, Breyer, Sotomayor
- Dissent: Alito, joined by Thomas, Gorsuch
- Kavanaugh took no part in the consideration or decision of the case.

Laws applied
- U.S. Const. amend. VIII

Madison v. Alabama, 586 U.S. 265 (2019), was a United States Supreme Court case regarding the Eighth Amendment to the United States Constitution, barring cruel and unusual punishment. The case deals with whether the Eighth Amendment prohibits executing a person for a crime they do not remember.

== Background ==
Vernon Madison (August 22, 1950 – February 22, 2020) shot police officer Julius Schulte twice in the back of the head in Mobile, Alabama in April 1985. Schulte was mediating a domestic disturbance between Madison and his ex-girlfriend; Madison also shot and injured her. Madison was an inmate at Holman Correctional Facility from September 1985 up until his death on February 22, 2020.

Three trials were held, as the convictions from the first two were overturned: the first because prosecutors unconstitutionally excluded black people from the jury and the second because they introduced evidence improperly. In the third trial, the jury decided on a sentence of life in prison, but the judge Ferrill McRae overruled them and gave Madison a sentence of death in 1994.

The execution was scheduled to occur in May 2016; the 11th Circuit Court of Appeals granted a stay on the day of the execution, which the Supreme Court upheld 5-3 (at the time, one seat on the nine-member court was empty owing to Justice Antonin Scalia's death 3 months prior).

In Dunn v. Madison, in November 2017, the Supreme Court unanimously overturned a 2-1 decision by the 11th Circuit, which had stopped the execution on the basis that Madison "does not rationally understand the connection between his crime and his execution". The Circuit Court was overruling a state court decision that had denied Madison's petition on the basis that Supreme Court precedent only barred execution if he lacked "understanding he is being executed as punishment for a crime". The Supreme Court did not rule on the merits of the case, but ruled that the Circuit Court overstepped its authority under the Antiterrorism and Effective Death Penalty Act of 1996, which set the standard for which federal courts can overturn a lower court's decision.

The execution was scheduled for January 2018; the Supreme Court granted a stay 30 minutes before Madison was scheduled to be executed, with Clarence Thomas, Samuel Alito, and Neil Gorsuch dissenting.

=== Madison's health ===
Madison had severe strokes in 2015 and 2016, resulting in vascular dementia and leaving him unable to remember killing officer Schulte. Prior to his death, he was blind and had suffered a severe mental decline; he only remembered the alphabet up to the letter G and had slurred speech. The strokes caused physical damage as well, leaving him incontinent and unable to walk without a walker. However, according to the psychologist appointed by Alabama courts seeking his execution, he understood that he would be executed and the reason for that.

== Precedent ==
In Ford v. Wainwright, the Supreme Court held in 1986 that executing the insane is not allowed due to the Eighth Amendment, and in Panetti v. Quarterman, they held in 2007 that to be sentenced to death, an inmate must understand "the meaning and purpose of" his death sentence.

== Case ==
The Supreme Court decided to hear the case in February 2018. Oral arguments were held on October 2, 2018. At oral argument, Alabama Deputy Attorney General Thomas Govan surprised some observers as well as Justices by agreeing with defense counsel Bryan Stevenson that dementia could be a form of incapacitation sufficient to meet the Ford and Panetti standards prohibiting the execution of some incapacitated inmates. Govan argued only that Madison's condition did not meet those tests because he still had the cognitive ability to understand why he was being executed, even if he could not recall the crime. Stevenson argued that Madison was disabled beyond solely memory loss and thus his execution would violate the Eighth Amendment's prohibition of cruel and unusual punishment.

== Decision ==
In a 5-3 opinion, authored by Justice Kagan, the Court held that the Eighth Amendment may permit executing a prisoner even if he or she cannot remember committing his or her crime, but it may prohibit executing a prisoner who has dementia or another disorder, rather than psychotic delusions. The Court held that if a prisoner is unable to rationally understand the reasons for his sentence, the Eighth Amendment forbids his execution.

Justice Alito in dissent, joined by Justice Thomas and Justice Gorsuch, would not have reached this question, stating that Madison presented only the first question (whether a state can execute a prisoner who cannot remember committing his crime) in his petition.

The Court remanded the case for the lower court to determine whether Madison was able to rationally understand the reasons for his sentence.

On Saturday, February 22, 2020, Vernon Madison died at the age of 69. He was never executed. Officials did not cite a cause of death, but they did say that foul play was unlikely. News reports said shortly after his death that results of an autopsy were pending.
