= Obduskey v. McCarthy & Holthus LLP =

- Supreme Court of the United States

Decided March 20, 2019
- Full case name: Obduskey v. McCarthy & Holthus LLP
- Docket no.: 17-1307
- Citations: 586 U.S. ___ (more)

Holding
- A business engaged in only nonjudicial foreclosure proceedings is not a "debt collector" under the Fair Debt Collection Practices Act, except for the limited purpose of Section 1692f(6).

Court membership
- Chief Justice John Roberts Associate Justices Clarence Thomas · Ruth Bader Ginsburg; Stephen Breyer · Samuel Alito; Sonia Sotomayor · Elena Kagan; Neil Gorsuch · Brett Kavanaugh

Case opinions
- Majority: Breyer, joined by unanimous
- Concurrence: Sotomayor

Laws applied
- Fair Debt Collection Practices Act

Obduskey v. McCarthy & Holthus LLP, 586 U.S. ___ (2019), was a United States Supreme Court case in which the court held that a business engaged in only nonjudicial foreclosure proceedings is not a "debt collector" under the Fair Debt Collection Practices Act, except for the limited purpose of Section 1692f(6).

== Background ==
the law firm McCarthy & Holthus LLP was hired to carry out a nonjudicial foreclosure on a Colorado home owned by Dennis Obduskey. McCarthy sent Obduskey correspondence related to the foreclosure. Obduskey responded with a letter invoking a federal Fair Debt Collection Practices Act (FDCPA) provision, 15 U. S. C. §1692g(b), which provides that if a consumer disputes the amount of a debt, a "debt collector" must "cease collection" until it "obtains verification of the debt" and mails a copy to the debtor. Instead, McCarthy initiated a nonjudicial foreclosure action. Obduskey sued, alleging that McCarthy failed to comply with the FDCPA's verification procedure. The district court dismissed on the ground that McCarthy was not a "debt collector" within the meaning of the FDCPA, and the Tenth Circuit affirmed.
