= Air & Liquid Systems Corp. v. DeVries =

- Supreme Court of the United States

Decided March 19, 2019
- Full case name: Air & Liquid Systems Corp. v. DeVries
- Docket no.: 17-1104
- Citations: 586 U.S. ___ (more)

Holding
- In the maritime tort context, a product manufacturer has a duty to warn when its product requires incorporation of a part, the manufacturer knows or has reason to know that the integrated product is likely to be dangerous for its intended uses, and the manufacturer has no reason to believe that the product's users will realize that danger.

Court membership
- Chief Justice John Roberts Associate Justices Clarence Thomas · Ruth Bader Ginsburg; Stephen Breyer · Samuel Alito; Sonia Sotomayor · Elena Kagan; Neil Gorsuch · Brett Kavanaugh

Case opinions
- Majority: Kavanaugh
- Dissent: Gorsuch, joined by Thomas, Alito

Air & Liquid Systems Corp. v. DeVries, 586 U.S. ___ (2019), was a United States Supreme Court case in which the court held that, in the maritime tort context, a product manufacturer has a duty to warn when its product requires incorporation of a part, the manufacturer knows or has reason to know that the integrated product is likely to be dangerous for its intended uses, and the manufacturer has no reason to believe that the product's users will realize that danger.

== Background ==
Air & Liquid Systems Corporation produced equipment for three United States Navy ships. The equipment required asbestos insulation or asbestos parts to function as intended, but the manufacturers did not always incorporate the asbestos into their products. Instead, the manufacturers delivered much of the equipment to the Navy without asbestos, and the Navy later added the asbestos to the equipment. Two Navy veterans, Kenneth McAfee and John DeVries, were exposed to asbestos on the ships and developed cancer. They and their wives sued the manufacturers, alleging that the asbestos exposure caused the cancer and contending that the manufacturers were negligent in failing to warn about the dangers of asbestos in the integrated products. Raising the "bare-metal defense", the manufacturers argued that they should not be liable for harms caused by later-added third-party parts. The district court granted summary judgment to the manufacturers, but the Third Circuit, adopting a foreseeability approach, vacated and remanded.
