= Tennessee Wine & Spirits Retailers Ass'n v. Thomas =

- Supreme Court of the United States

Argued January 16, 2019 Decided June 26, 2019
- Full case name: Tennessee Wine and Spirits Retailers Association v. Russell F. Thomas, Executive Director of the Tennessee Alcoholic Beverage Commission, et al.
- Docket no.: 18-96
- Citations: 588 U.S. 504 (more) 139 S. Ct. 2449; 204 L. Ed. 2d 801

Case history
- Prior: Partial summary judgment granted, Byrd v. Tenn. Wine & Spirits Retailers Ass'n, 259 F. Supp. 3d 785 (M.D. Tenn. 2017); affirmed, Byrd v. Tenn. Wine & Spirits Retailers Ass'n, 883 F. Supp. 3d 608 (6th Cir. 2018)

Holding
- Tennessee's two-year durational-residency requirement applicable to retail liquor store license applicants violates the Commerce Clause and is not authorized by the Twenty-first Amendment

Court membership
- Chief Justice John Roberts Associate Justices Clarence Thomas · Ruth Bader Ginsburg; Stephen Breyer · Samuel Alito; Sonia Sotomayor · Elena Kagan; Neil Gorsuch · Brett Kavanaugh

Case opinions
- Majority: Alito, joined by Roberts, Ginsburg, Breyer, Sotomayor, Kagan, and Kavanaugh
- Dissent: Gorsuch, joined by Thomas

Laws applied
- U.S. Const. art. I, § 8, cl. 3

Tennessee Wine and Spirits Retailers Association v. Thomas, 588 U.S. 504 (2019), was a United States Supreme Court case which held that Tennessee's two-year durational-residency requirement applicable to retail liquor store license applicants violated the Commerce Clause (Dormant Commerce Clause) and was not authorized by the Twenty-first Amendment.

== Background ==
The state of Tennessee imposed a series of durational-residency requirements on all people and businesses seeking to obtain or renew a license to operate a liquor store. This included a two-year durational-residency requirement for applicants of initial licenses. Two parties applied to open or operate stores—Total Wine & More in Knoxville, Tennessee and Affluere Investments, Inc., which is owned by Doug and Mary Ketchum, the new owners of Kimbrough Wines & Spirits in Memphis, Tennessee. The state intended to approve based on the state Attorney General's opinion that the residency requirements were unenforceable. The director of the Tennessee Alcoholic Beverages Commission sued the state to prevent approval.

The United States Court of Appeals for the Sixth Circuit struck down all of the provisions as violations of the Commerce Clause. Tennessee Wine and Spirits Retailers Association petitioned the ruling pertaining to the two-year residency requirement. The case was heard by the Supreme Court of the United States, with Shay Dvoretsky arguing on behalf of the retail association, and Illinois Solicitor General David Franklin arguing on behalf of 34 states and the District of Columbia as a "friends of the court" supporting the retail association. Carter Phillips of Sidley Austin LLP represented Total Wine and Michael Bindas of the Institute for Justice represented the Ketchums; Phillips presented oral argument on behalf of both.

== Issue ==
Does Tennessee's two-year residency requirement for the obtaining of a liquor license violate the Commerce Clause of the United States Constitution?

== Ruling ==
The Court applies the principle known as the "Dormant Commerce Clause" or "negative Commerce Clause" which prohibits state laws that unduly restrict interstate commerce. In its 7-2 opinion, the Court held that the states' power to regulate alcohol, "is not a license to impose all manner of protectionist restrictions on commerce in alcoholic beverages," yet Tennessee's law "blatantly favor[ed] the State's residents" while having "little relationship to public health and safety." The Court upheld the 6th Circuit ruling, striking down the two-year provision as unconstitutional.

== Aftermath ==
In the aftermath of the Supreme Court's opinion that struck down Tennessee's residency requirement for liquor store ownership, four state legislatures repealed the unconstitutional provisions from their state statutes. These were Kentucky (in 2020), Indiana, Kansas (2021), and Louisiana (2022). In 2019, Oklahoma's attorney general issued Opinion Letter 2019-13 stating that Oklahoma's residency requirement was unenforceable. As a result of these reforms, residency requirements to own a liquor store no longer exist in any state.
