= Dutra Group v. Batterton =

- Supreme Court of the United States

Decided June 24, 2019
- Full case name: Dutra Group v. Batterton
- Docket no.: 18-266
- Citations: 588 U.S. ___ (more)

Holding
- A plaintiff may not recover punitive damages on a maritime claim of unseaworthiness.

Court membership
- Chief Justice John Roberts Associate Justices Clarence Thomas · Ruth Bader Ginsburg; Stephen Breyer · Samuel Alito; Sonia Sotomayor · Elena Kagan; Neil Gorsuch · Brett Kavanaugh

Case opinions
- Majority: Alito
- Dissent: Ginsberg, joined by Breyer, Sotomayor

Dutra Group v. Batterton, 588 U.S. ___ (2019), was a United States Supreme Court case in which the Court held that a plaintiff may not recover punitive damages on a maritime claim of unseaworthiness.
