= Mission Product Holdings, Inc. v. Tempnology, LLC =

- Supreme Court of the United States

Decided May 20, 2019
- Full case name: Mission Product Holdings, Inc. v. Tempnology, LLC
- Docket no.: 17-1657
- Citations: 587 U.S. ___ (more)

Holding
- A debtor's rejection of an executory contract under Section 365 of the Bankruptcy Code has the same effect as a breach of that contract outside bankruptcy. Such an act cannot rescind rights that the contract previously granted.

Court membership
- Chief Justice John Roberts Associate Justices Clarence Thomas · Ruth Bader Ginsburg; Stephen Breyer · Samuel Alito; Sonia Sotomayor · Elena Kagan; Neil Gorsuch · Brett Kavanaugh

Case opinions
- Majority: Kagan
- Concurrence: Sotomayor
- Dissent: Gorsuch

Laws applied
- Bankruptcy Code

Mission Product Holdings, Inc. v. Tempnology, LLC, 587 U.S. ___ (2019), was a United States Supreme Court case in which the court held that a debtor's rejection of an executory contract under Section 365 of the Bankruptcy Code has the same effect as a breach of that contract outside bankruptcy. Such an act cannot rescind rights that the contract previously granted.

== Background ==
Mission Product Holdings, Inc., entered into a contract with Tempnology, LLC, which gave Mission a license to use Tempnology's trademarks in connection with the distribution of certain clothing and accessories. Tempnology filed for Chapter 11 bankruptcy and sought to reject its agreement with Mission. Section 365 of the Bankruptcy Code enables a debtor to "reject any executory contract"—meaning a contract that neither party has finished performing. It further provides that rejection "constitutes a breach of such contract." The Bankruptcy Court approved Tempnology's rejection and further held that the rejection terminated Mission's rights to use Tempnology's trademarks. The Bankruptcy Appellate Panel reversed, relying on Section 365(g)'s statement that rejection "constitutes a breach" to hold that rejection does not terminate rights that would survive a breach of contract outside bankruptcy. The First Circuit Court of Appeals rejected the Panel's judgment and reinstated the Bankruptcy Court's decision.
