= Merck Sharp & Dohme Corp. v. Albrecht =

- Supreme Court of the United States

Decided May 20, 2019
- Full case name: Merck Sharp & Dohme Corp. v. Albrecht
- Docket no.: 17-290
- Citations: 587 U.S. ___ (more)

Holding
- Whether a state-law failure-to-warn claim was pre-empted in light of "clear evidence" that the FDA would not have approved a change to a drug's label is a question of law to be decided by a judge.

Court membership
- Chief Justice John Roberts Associate Justices Clarence Thomas · Ruth Bader Ginsburg; Stephen Breyer · Samuel Alito; Sonia Sotomayor · Elena Kagan; Neil Gorsuch · Brett Kavanaugh

Case opinions
- Majority: Breyer, joined by Thomas, Ginsburg, Sotomayor, Kagan, Gorsuch
- Concurrence: Thomas
- Concurrence: Alito (in judgment), joined by Roberts, Kavanaugh

Merck Sharp & Dohme Corp. v. Albrecht, 587 U.S. ___ (2019), was a United States Supreme Court case in which the court held that whether a state-law failure-to-warn claim was pre-empted in light of "clear evidence" that the FDA would not have approved a change to a drug's label is a question of law to be decided by a judge.

== Background ==
Merck Sharp & Dohme Corp. manufactures Fosamax, a drug that treats and prevents osteoporosis in postmenopausal women. However, the mechanism through which Fosamax treats and prevents osteoporosis may increase the risk that patients will suffer "atypical femoral fractures," that is, a rare type of complete, low-energy fracture that affects the thigh bone. When the Food and Drug Administration first approved of the manufacture and sale of Fosamax in 1995, the Fosamax label did not warn of the then-speculative risk of atypical femoral fractures associated with the drug. But stronger evidence connecting Fosamax to atypical femoral fractures developed after 1995. And the FDA ultimately ordered Merck to add a warning about atypical femoral fractures to the Fosamax label in 2011.

The plaintiffs, including Doris Albrecht, were more than 500 individuals who took Fosamax and suffered atypical femoral fractures between 1999 and 2010. The plaintiffs sued Merck seeking tort damages on the ground that state law imposed upon Merck a legal duty to warn respondents and their doctors about the risk of atypical femoral fractures associated with using Fosamax. Merck, in defense, argued that the plaintiffs' state-law failure-to-warn claims should be dismissed as pre-empted by federal law. Merck conceded that the FDA regulations would have permitted Merck to try to change the label to add a warning before 2010, but Merck asserted that the FDA would have rejected that attempt. In particular, Merck claimed that the FDA's rejection of Merck's 2008 attempt to warn of a risk of "stress fractures" showed that the FDA would also have rejected any attempt by Merck to warn of the risk of atypical femoral fractures associated with the drug.

The district court agreed with Merck's pre-emption argument and granted summary judgment to Merck, but the Third Circuit Court of Appeals vacated and remanded. The Court of Appeals recognized that its pre-emption analysis was controlled by the Supreme Court's previous decision in Wyeth v. Levine, which held that a state-law failure-to-warn claim is pre-empted where there is "clear evidence" that the FDA would not have approved a change to the label. The Court of Appeals, however, suggested that the "clear evidence" standard had led to varying lower court applications and that it would be helpful for this Court to "clarif[y] or buil[d] out the doctrine."
