= Biestek v. Berryhill =

- Supreme Court of the United States

Decided April 1, 2019
- Full case name: Biestek v. Berryhill
- Docket no.: 17-1184
- Citations: 587 U.S. ___ (more)

Holding
- A vocational expert's refusal to provide private market-survey data upon the applicant's request does not categorically preclude the testimony from counting as "substantial evidence."

Court membership
- Chief Justice John Roberts Associate Justices Clarence Thomas · Ruth Bader Ginsburg; Stephen Breyer · Samuel Alito; Sonia Sotomayor · Elena Kagan; Neil Gorsuch · Brett Kavanaugh

Case opinions
- Majority: Kagan
- Dissent: Sotomayor
- Dissent: Gorsuch, joined by Ginsburg

Biestek v. Berryhill, 587 U.S. ___ (2019), was a United States Supreme Court case in which the court held that a vocational expert's refusal to provide private market-survey data upon the applicant's request does not categorically preclude the testimony from counting as "substantial evidence." Substantial evidence is "more than a mere scintilla," and means only "such relevant evidence as a reasonable mind might accept as adequate to support a conclusion."

== Background ==
Michael Biestek, a former construction worker, applied for social security disability benefits, claiming he could no longer work due to physical and mental disabilities. The United States Social Security Administration (SSA) assigned an administrative law judge (ALJ) to conduct a hearing, at which the ALJ had to determine whether Biestek could successfully transition to less physically demanding work. For guidance on that issue, the ALJ heard testimony from a vocational expert regarding the types of jobs Biestek could still perform and the number of such jobs that existed in the national economy. On cross-examination, Biestek's attorney asked the expert "where [she was] getting [her numbers] from," and the expert explained they were from her own individual labor market surveys. Biestek's attorney then requested that the expert turn over the surveys. The expert declined. The ALJ ultimately denied Biestek benefits, basing his conclusion on the expert's testimony about the number of jobs available to him. Biestek sought review in federal court, where an ALJ's factual findings are "conclusive" if supported by "substantial evidence." The district court rejected Biestek's argument that the expert's testimony could not possibly constitute substantial evidence because she had declined to produce her supporting data. The Sixth Circuit affirmed.
