= PDR Network, LLC v. Carlton Harris Chiropractic, Inc. =

- Supreme Court of the United States

Decided June 20, 2019
- Full case name: PDR Network, LLC v. Carlton Harris Chiropractic, Inc.
- Docket no.: 17-1705
- Citations: 588 U.S. ___ (more)

Questions presented
- Whether the Hobbs Act strips district courts of jurisdiction to reconsider the validity of an agency’s legal interpretation of certain statutes.

Holding
- The extent to which the 2006 FCC order defining "unsolicited advertisement" binds the lower courts may depend on the resolution of two preliminary sets of questions that were not aired before the Court of Appeals.

Court membership
- Chief Justice John Roberts Associate Justices Clarence Thomas · Ruth Bader Ginsburg; Stephen Breyer · Samuel Alito; Sonia Sotomayor · Elena Kagan; Neil Gorsuch · Brett Kavanaugh

Case opinions
- Majority: Breyer, joined by unanimous
- Concurrence: Thomas, joined by Gorsuch
- Concurrence: Kavanaugh, joined by Thomas, Alito, Gorsuch

Laws applied
- Hobbs Act, Administrative Procedure Act

PDR Network, LLC v. Carlton Harris Chiropractic, Inc., 588 U.S. ___ (2019), was a United States Supreme Court case in which the court held that the extent to which the 2006 Federal Communications Commission (FCC) order defining "unsolicited advertisement" binds the lower courts may depend on the resolution of two preliminary sets of questions that were not aired before the Court of Appeals.

== Background ==
PDR produced the Physicians' Desk Reference, which compiled information about the uses and side effects of various prescription drugs. PDR sent health care providers faxes stating that they could reserve a free copy of a new ebook version of the Reference on PDR’s website. Carlton & Harris Chiropractic, a fax recipient, brought a putative class action in federal district court, claiming that PDR's fax was an "unsolicited advertisement" prohibited by the Telephone Consumer Protection Act of 1991 (Telephone Act). The district court dismissed the case, concluding that PDR's fax was not an "unsolicited advertisement" under the Telephone Act. The Fourth Circuit vacated the district court’s judgment. Based on the Hobbs Act, which provides that courts of appeals have "exclusive jurisdiction to enjoin, set aside, suspend (in whole or in part), or to determine the validity of" certain "final orders of the Federal Communication Commission," the Fourth Circuit held that the district court was required to adopt the interpretation of "unsolicited advertisement" set forth in a 2006 FCC Order. Because the Fourth Circuit found that the 2006 Order interpreted the term "unsolicited advertisement" to "include any offer of a free good or service," the Fourth Circuit concluded that the facts as alleged demonstrated that PDR’s fax was an unsolicited advertisement.

== The questions ==
Despite the unanimity of the decision, the Justices were deeply divided. Thus, they did not decide the case outright. Instead, the Supreme Court sent two questions back to the Fourth Circuit so that they could decide it.

First: Is the Order the equivalent of a legislative rule, which is issued by an agency pursuant to statutory authority and has the force and effect of law? Or is it the equivalent of an interpretive rule, which simply advises the public of the agency’s construction of the statutes and rules which it administers and lacks the force and effect of law? If the Order is the equivalent of an interpretive rule, it may not be binding on a district court, and a district court therefore may not be required to adhere to it.

Second, did PDR have a prior and adequate opportunity to seek judicial review of the Order? If the Hobbs Act's exclusive-review provision, which requires certain challenges to FCC orders to be brought in a court of appeals "within 60 days after" the entry of the order in question did not afford PDR a prior and adequate opportunity for judicial review, it may be that the Administrative Procedure Act permits PDR to challenge the order’s validity in this enforcement proceeding.
