= Kisor v. Wilkie =

- Supreme Court of the United States

Argued March 27, 2019 Decided June 26, 2019
- Full case name: James L. Kisor v. Robert L. Wilkie
- Docket no.: 18-15
- Citations: 588 U.S. (more) 139 S. Ct. 2400; 204 L. Ed. 2d 841

Case history
- Prior: Kisor v. Shulkin, 869 F.3d 1360 (Fed. Cir. 2017); rehearing en banc denied, 880 F.3d 1378 (Fed. Cir. 2018); cert. granted, 202 L. Ed. 2d 491 (2018).

Holding
- There is no sufficient cause to overturn Auer or Bowles, but a court must use all interpretive powers it has to affirm if the Auer deference is appropriate.

Court membership
- Chief Justice John Roberts Associate Justices Clarence Thomas · Ruth Bader Ginsburg; Stephen Breyer · Samuel Alito; Sonia Sotomayor · Elena Kagan; Neil Gorsuch · Brett Kavanaugh

Case opinions
- Majority: Kagan (Parts I, II–B, III–B, and IV), joined by Roberts, Ginsburg, Breyer, Sotomayor
- Plurality: Kagan (Parts II–A and III–A), joined by Ginsburg, Breyer, Sotomayor
- Concurrence: Roberts (in part)
- Concurrence: Gorsuch (in judgment), joined by Thomas; Kavanaugh (Parts I, II, III, IV, and V); Alito (Parts I, II, and III)
- Concurrence: Kavanaugh (in judgment), joined by Alito

Kisor v. Wilkie, No. 18-15, 588 U.S. ___ (2019), was a US Supreme Court case related to the interpretation by an executive agency of its own ambiguous regulations. The case involved a veteran who had been denied some benefits from the United States Department of Veterans Affairs due to the agency's interpretation of its regulations. The case challenges the "Auer deference" established in the 1997 case Auer v. Robbins, in which the judiciary branch of the government normally defers to an agency's own interpretation of its own regulations in resolving matters of law. Lower courts, including the Federal Appeals Circuit Courts, ruled against the veteran, acknowledging the Auer deference.

The case sought to have Auer overturned. The Court issued its decision in June 2019 that Kisor lacked sufficient motivation and rationale to overturn Auer on precedent, but did reverse and remand the veteran's case to be reheard with stricter adherence to the principles of whether the Auer deference did apply in the veteran's case. However, the Court did state that there are times when the Auer deference may be inappropriate, and outlined rules for lower courts to use as a metric.

== Legal background ==
The 1984 case Chevron U.S.A., Inc. v. Natural Resources Defense Council, Inc. introduced what is known as the Chevron deference, a doctrine frequently applied in federal courts. In essence, the Chevron deference is used to defer to an executive agency's interpretation of the "construction of the statute which it administers", as long as Congress has not passed any legislation to address the statute, and the interpretation is a "permissible construction" of the statute. This was further established in Auer v. Robbins in 1997, which stated that Chevron deference would also apply to interpretations of regulations established by the agency, as long as the interpretation was not inconsistent with the regulation. The decision of Auer had been previously mirrored in Bowles v. Seminole Rock & Sand Co., but most of the federal courts have adopted the term Auer deference.

Since the ruling on Auer, many legal commentators, starting with John Manning, later made Dean of Harvard Law School, have expressed concern that this ruling gives executive agencies too much power, able to draw judicial power in a growing administrative state. Some have found agencies more likely to write vague regulations so that they can be interpreted as needed in future legal challenges.

Justice Antonin Scalia, who wrote the majority opinion for Auer, later stated his regret for writing that decision, calling it "one of the worst opinions in the history of this country," and questioned it in a concurring opinion in Talk America v. Michigan Bell Telephone Co. Justice Clarence Thomas had written in his dissenting opinion on the denial of the petition for United Student Aid Funds v. Bible (Docket 15–861) that members of the Court, including himself, Chief Justice John Roberts and Justices Samuel Alito, Anthony Kennedy and Antonin Scalia, had "repeatedly called for [Auer's] reconsideration in an appropriate case". Observers also identified that Justice Neil Gorsuch, while he served on the United States Court of Appeals for the Tenth Circuit, authored decisions that called for a re-evaluation of Auer.

== Case background ==
James Kisor is a veteran Marine from the Vietnam War, and had been a participant in Operation Harvest Moon. In 1982, stating that he had developed posttraumatic stress disorder (PTSD) from his service, Kisor sought disability benefits from the United States Department of Veterans Affairs (VA). On review, the VA disagreed he had PTSD and denied him disability benefits. Kisor appealed that decision in 2006, this time with additional documentation that was not available in 1982, including his service record. The VA granted benefits with this information, but with a start date of 2006 rather than 1982. The VA interpreted its own regulations that the new documents presented were not "relevant" to his first request in 1982, despite Kisor stating that the VA affirmed his PTSD from his combat record forms. Both the Court of Appeals for Veterans Claims and the United States Court of Appeals for the Federal Circuit affirmed the VA's decision, affirming that Auer gave the VA the ability to define the meaning of "relevant" in this regulation, and putting the onus on Kisor to demonstrate it was not a valid interpretation. Kisor's petition for the Federal Circuit to rehear the case en banc was denied, with three judges dissenting.

== Supreme Court ==
Kisor filed a petition for writ of certiorari to the Supreme Court in April 2018, asking two questions. First, whether Auer, as well as the related case Bowles v. Seminole Rock & Sand Co. (1945) should be overturned, and second, whether the canon of interpretation requiring courts to construe interpretive ambiguity in favor of veterans trumps Auer deference. The Supreme Court granted the petition on the first question only, with oral arguments heard on March 27, 2019. During oral arguments, while the Court acknowledged the shortcomings of allowing agencies to interpret their own policies without reasonable public input; and how Auer contributed towards the administrative state; they also expressed concern that such agencies, and not the judiciary, are typically the only appropriate entities with expert knowledge in the agency's field to make appropriate interpretations, citing the example of a complex chemical requirement established under the United States Food and Drug Administration. The Justices expressed concern with fractured interpretation of regulations within other agencies should Auer be overruled. Justice Stephen Breyer half-jokingly expressed concern that a poor decision in this case could be the "greatest judicial power grab since Marbury v. Madison".

The Court issued its decision on June 26, 2019, reversing and remanding the case back to the Federal Circuit Court. The ruling specifically did not overrule Auer or Seminole Rock, as Kisor's case lacked the proper motivation for doing so and to overcome stare decisis, though some dissents-in-part from Justices Thomas, Alito, Gorsuch, and Kavanaugh indicated they would have ruled in favor of overturning those decisions.

Justice Elena Kagan, writing for the majority, issued an opinion by herself and the other liberal justices, joined partly by Chief Justice Roberts. Kagan began by reiterating the justification of Auer, namely, the court's belief of implicit Congressional intent. The court inferred that the agency itself can best state the regulation's authorial intent, has the expertise to make what's essentially a policy decision, and can promote uniformity. Justice Kagan further stated that while the decision upholds the Auer deference, "we reinforce its limits." Kagan wrote that the Auer deference is "sometimes appropriate and sometimes not," and stated that the Auer deference can only be considered when "a regulation is genuinely ambiguous"; the court has exhausted traditional tools of statutory construction; "the agency's construction of its rule must still be reasonable"; the rule must be an authoritative statement by superior officials of the agency; it must implicate agency expertise; and it cannot create unfair surprise.

Chief Justice Roberts joined only the portion of the majority opinion that limited the application of Auer. He did not join the parts of the opinion that stated the justifications for Auer and declined to overrule it.

The Court's unanimous ruling on the judgment of the specific matter of Kisor's case with the VA found that the Federal Circuit did not use all the tools it had at hand to properly analyze the interpretation of the VA's regulations, thus vacating the prior decision and remanding it for review in light of the limitations set forth for the Auer deference.

== See also ==
- List of United States Supreme Court cases, volume 588
