= Nielsen v. Preap =

- Supreme Court of the United States

Argued October 10, 2018 Decided March 19, 2019
- Full case name: Kirstjen M. Nielsen, Secretary of Homeland Security, et al. v. Mony Preap, et al.
- Docket no.: 16-1363
- Citations: 586 U.S. (more) 139 S. Ct. 954; 203 L. Ed. 2d 333
- Argument: Oral argument
- Decision: Opinion

Case history
- Prior: Preap v. Johnson, 303 F.R.D. 566 (N.D. Cal. 2014); affirmed, 831 F.3d 1193 (9th Cir. 2016); cert. granted, 138 S. Ct. 1279 (2018); Khoury v. Asher, 3 F. Supp. 3d 877 (W.D. Wash. 2014); affirmed, 667 F. App'x 966 (9th Cir. 2016); cert. granted, 138 S. Ct. 1279 (2018)

Holding
- The government has the power to detain, at any time, undocumented immigrants that have committed certain crimes that could lead to their deportation, even if they were not detained by immigration authorities upon release from criminal custody.

Court membership
- Chief Justice John Roberts Associate Justices Clarence Thomas · Ruth Bader Ginsburg; Stephen Breyer · Samuel Alito; Sonia Sotomayor · Elena Kagan; Neil Gorsuch · Brett Kavanaugh

Case opinions
- Majority: Alito (Parts I, III–A, III–B–1, and IV), joined by Roberts, Thomas, Gorsuch, Kavanaugh
- Plurality: Alito (Parts II and III–B–2), joined by Roberts, Kavanaugh
- Concurrence: Kavanaugh
- Concurrence: Thomas (in part), joined by Gorsuch
- Dissent: Breyer, joined by Ginsburg, Sotomayor, Kagan

Nielsen v. Preap, No. 16-1363, 586 U.S. ___ (2019), was a United States Supreme Court case related to the detention of legal immigrants with criminal histories. In a 5–4 vote, the Court ruled that the government has the power to detain, at any time, immigrants that have committed certain crimes that could lead to their deportation, even if they were not detained by immigration authorities upon release from criminal custody.

The decision was heavily based on statutory construction.

== Background ==
The case centers on the language of the Illegal Immigration Reform and Immigrant Responsibility Act of 1996, codified at 8 U.S.C. § 1226, which states that an inadmissible or deportable non-citizen "shall be taken into custody" when "released".

Non-citizens detained by the Department of Homeland Security may apply to be paroled or released on bond while awaiting a decision on their immigration status. In some cases, however, detention is mandatory, who are considered dangerous because of a criminal history or suspicion of a connection to terrorism. In these cases, Congress has specified that aliens are to be arrested "when they are released". In Demore v. Kim the Supreme Court said §1226(c) was made law because Congress was concerned that "deportable criminal aliens who are not detained continue to engage in crime and fail to appear for their removal hearings in large numbers". In the specific case, the respondents were detained by immigration officials five to eleven years later after being released.

Respondents Mony Preap, Eduardo Vega Padilla, and Juan Lozano Magdaleno were legal immigrants that had been convicted of deportable crimes in California, served their time, and had been released from prison. Several years later they were taken into custody for immigration detention. With help from the American Civil Liberties Union, the three sued the Department of Homeland Security, arguing that because they were not immediately detained on release from the criminal sentence, Sect. 1226 did not apply to them. The District Court certified their case as a class-action case and granted a preliminary injunction for all immigrants in similar situations, ruling that they could not be held under §1226(c). The Ninth Circuit upheld the ruling on appeal. A similar separate class-action case was made in Washington state, under Khoury v. Asher, where both the District and Ninth Circuit reached the same conclusion, that the immigrants could not be detained since they were not detained immediately after release from the criminal offense.

The Supreme Court granted certiorari to resolve the circuit split created by Preap and Khoury.

== Supreme Court ==
The Department of Homeland Security petitioned their case to the Supreme Court, who granted certiorari to hear the challenge on both cases, citing that the Ninth Circuit's decision had created a split on the matter among the circuit courts. Oral arguments were heard on October 10, 2018.

The decision was released on March 19, 2019. In the 5–4 decision, the Supreme Court reversed the Ninth Circuit's two rulings and stated that the language of Section 1226 allowed detention at any time after the deportable offense. Justice Samuel Alito, writing for the majority, stated that Congress enacted mandatory detention out of concern that individualized hearings could not be trusted to reveal which deportable criminal aliens who are not detained might continue to engage in crime or fail to appear for their removal hearings, and that allowing for detention long after release reflected the fact that immigration officials are not always notified or available in a timely manner to be at the point of release. Those delays may be caused by unintentional delays, or in some cases, purposely not notified as in the case of some sanctuary cities. However, Alito did acknowledge that this interpretation would end up targeting a wider range of immigrants, including those that have only had minor infractions such as drug offenders and tax cheats, but was necessary to serve the purpose of the law as written by Congress. The other four justices on the conservative wing joined on the majority, though Justice Brett Kavanaugh wrote his own opinion that concurred in part to Alito's, while Justice Clarence Thomas also wrote a concurrence in part, joined by Justice Neil Gorsuch.

The dissenting opinion was delivered by Justice Stephen Breyer, joined by the other three liberal Justices. Breyer cautioned that the majority opinion gave the government a new wide-ranging power; "It is a power to detain persons who committed a minor crime many years before, and it is a power to hold those persons, perhaps for many months, without any opportunity to obtain bail."

The decision of the Supreme Court was noted to be the second within the last few years to support a strong government stance on immigration, following Trump v. Hawaii (Docket 17-965).
