= Mitchell v. Wisconsin =

- Supreme Court of the United States

Argued April 23, 2019 Decided June 27, 2019
- Full case name: Gerald P. Mitchell, Petitioner v. Wisconsin
- Docket no.: 18-6210
- Citations: 588 U.S. 840 (more) 139 S. Ct. 2525; 204 L. Ed. 2d 1040

Case history
- Prior: State v. Mitchell, 2018 WI 84, 383 Wis. 2d 192, 914 N.W.2d 151 (2018); cert. granted, 139 S. Ct. 915 (2019).

Holding
- When a driver is unconscious and cannot be given a breath test, the exigent-circumstances doctrine generally permits a blood test without a warrant.

Court membership
- Chief Justice John Roberts Associate Justices Clarence Thomas · Ruth Bader Ginsburg; Stephen Breyer · Samuel Alito; Sonia Sotomayor · Elena Kagan; Neil Gorsuch · Brett Kavanaugh

Case opinions
- Plurality: Alito, joined by Roberts, Breyer, Kavanaugh
- Concurrence: Thomas (in judgment)
- Dissent: Sotomayor, joined by Ginsburg, Kagan
- Dissent: Gorsuch

Mitchell v. Wisconsin, 588 U.S. 840 (2019), is a United States Supreme Court case in which the Court held that, when a driver is unconscious and cannot be given a breath test, the exigent-circumstances doctrine generally permits a blood test without a warrant.

== Background ==
In May 2013, Gerald Mitchell crashed his car near a lake in Sheboygan, Wisconsin. When police arrived, they used a breathalyzer to test his blood alcohol content. Mitchell registered a 0.24% BAC and was subsequently arrested for OWI. As police were driving him to the police station, he fell unconscious, so the officers changed plans and drove him to a local hospital to have his blood drawn intravenously. This test registered his BAC at 0.22%, and prosecutors formally charged Mitchell with violating several Wisconsin drunk driving laws.

=== Lower court proceedings ===
At the trial court, Mitchell made a motion to suppress the results of the hospital blood draw on the grounds that it was a warrantless search and thus unconstitutional under the Fourth Amendment. The prosecutor argued that Wisconsin's state laws constitute implied consent to blood draws once someone begins driving a vehicle. Sheboygan County Judge Terence Bourke sided with the prosecutor, denying Mitchell's motion to suppress. A jury then convicted Mitchell of all charges.

Mitchell appealed his conviction to the state appellate court on the basis that the evidence gained from his blood draw should have been suppressed. The appellate court declined to hear the case, and instead certified two questions to the Wisconsin Supreme Court – whether the "implied consent" rule was constitutional, and whether a warrantless blood draw from an unconscious person was a violation of the Fourth Amendment.

In a 5–2 decision written by Chief Justice Roggensack, the Wisconsin Supreme Court upheld Mitchell's conviction, answering that the "implied consent" rule was constitutional, and thus the blood draw was permissible under the Fourth Amendment. Justice Kelly wrote a concurring opinion that was joined by Justice Rebecca Bradley. In it, he argued that the "implied consent" rule is unconstitutional, but that the exigent circumstances doctrine, along with United States Supreme Court precedent, allow for a warrantless blood draw from an unconscious driver who is suspected of being intoxicated. Justice Ann Walsh Bradley wrote a dissent joined by Justice Abrahamson, which argued that "implied consent" is not the same as actual consent, and that a blood draw is such an invasive type of search that exigent circumstances do not apply. Thus, nothing the officers did was constitutional, and the blood draw should have been thrown out as evidence.

== Supreme Court ==
Mitchell applied for certiorari before the United States Supreme Court, which accepted the case to decide "[w]hether a statute authorizing a blood draw from an unconscious motorist provides an exception to the Fourth Amendment warrant requirement."

Oral argument was held on April 23, 2019.

On June 27, 2019, the Court announced its decision. In a plurality opinion written by Justice Samuel Alito and joined by Chief Justice Roberts and Justices Breyer and Kavanaugh, the United States Supreme Court reversed the judgement of the Wisconsin Supreme Court. Justice Thomas wrote an opinion concurring in the judgement. In opposition, Justice Sotomayor wrote a dissenting opinion that was joined by Justices Ginsburg and Kagan. Justice Gorsuch wrote a lone one-paragraph dissenting opinion, arguing that the Court did not properly decide the question presented. He said that he would have dismissed the case as improvidently granted.

== See also ==
- Birchfield v. North Dakota
