= Exigent circumstance =

US law covering police entry to property

In criminal procedure law of the United States, an exigent circumstance allows law enforcement (under certain circumstances) to enter a structure without a search warrant, or if they have a "knock and announce" warrant, allows them to enter without knocking and waiting for the owner's permission to enter. It must be a situation where people are in imminent danger, evidence faces imminent destruction, or a suspect's escape is imminent. Once entry is obtained, the plain view doctrine applies, allowing the seizure of any evidence or contraband discovered in the course of actions consequent upon the exigent circumstances.

== Criminal procedure ==
In the criminal procedure context, exigent circumstance means the following:

An emergency situation requiring swift action to prevent imminent danger to life or serious damage to property, or to forestall the imminent escape of a suspect, or destruction of evidence. There is no ready litmus test for determining whether such circumstances exist, and in each case the extraordinary situation must be measured by the facts known by officials.

Those circumstances that would cause a reasonable person to believe that entry (or other relevant prompt action) was necessary to prevent physical harm to the officers or other persons, the destruction of relevant evidence, the escape of a suspect, or some other consequence improperly frustrating legitimate law enforcement efforts.

Exigent circumstances may make a warrantless search constitutional if probable cause exists. The existence of exigent circumstances is a mixed question of law and fact. There is no absolute test for determining if exigent circumstances exist, but general factors have been identified, which include clear evidence of probable cause; the seriousness of the offense and likelihood of destruction of evidence; limitations on the search to minimize the intrusion only to preventing destruction of evidence; and clear indications of exigency.

Exigency may be determined by degree of urgency involved, amount of time needed to get a search warrant, whether evidence is about to be removed or destroyed, danger at the site, knowledge of the suspect that police are on the trail, and/or ready destructibility of the evidence. In determining the time necessary to obtain a warrant, a telephonic warrant should be considered. As electronic data may be altered or eradicated in seconds, in a factually compelling case, the doctrine of exigent circumstances will support a warrantless seizure.

Even in exigent circumstances, while a warrantless seizure may be permitted, a subsequent warrant to search may still be necessary.

== Miranda rights ==
In New Jersey v. Boretsky, the Supreme Court of New Jersey held that the emergency aid doctrine overrode the need to provide a Miranda warning to a suspect, even in the face of ambiguous or equivocal assertions of the right to legal representation.

== Emergency aid doctrine ==
Emergency aid doctrine is an exception to the Fourth Amendment, allowing warrantless entry to premises if exigent circumstances make it necessary. A number of exceptions are classified under the general heading of criminal enforcement: where evidence of a suspected crime is in danger of being lost; where the police officers are in hot pursuit; where there is a probability that a suspect will flee before a warrant can be obtained; where a person is in need of assistance; where entry is required to prevent harm to a person. In deciding whether such entry was legal, courts will consider whether a reasonable and prudent person would have considered there was need to make an immediate entry.

In the 1925 Supreme Court case Carroll et al. v. United States, George Carroll and John Kiro were indicted and convicted for carrying "spirituous liquor" in contravention of the National Prohibition Act. Police officers had followed the defendants after their car passed their patrol car and after they caught up with them, they stopped them. After requiring them to pull over, the police officers then conducted a search of the vehicle. In finding that the search was legal, the court compared stopping and searching motor vehicles to the way that the Coast Guard are able to stop and search vessels at sea. The 1970 case of Chambers v. Maroney upheld the categorical application of the automobile exception as it applied to a car that had been searched when impounded. The court upheld the constitutionality of the search on the grounds that at the time the car was stopped, there was probable cause to conduct a search.

In 1973, the case of Cady v. Dombrowski provided further support for the categorical application of the automotive exemption. Dombrowski, a police officer, was stopped and arrested while driving drunk. Wondering about the location of Dombrowski's service firearm, which he was meant to carry with him at all times, another police officer conducted a search of the car. In doing so, he uncovered bloodstained items, which eventually led to Dombrowski’s arrest and later conviction for murder. This evidence was admissible.

== See also ==
- Missouri v. McNeely (2013) The United States Supreme Court ruled that police must generally obtain a warrant before subjecting a drunken-driving suspect to a blood test, and that the natural metabolism of blood alcohol does not establish a per se exigency that would justify a blood draw without consent.
- Mitchell v. Wisconsin (2019) U.S. Supreme Court case in which the Court ruled that in the event a driver is unconscious and therefore can't be given a breath test as an alternative to testing blood, exigent circumstances allow for the drawing of blood without a warrant.
- Plain view doctrine
- Search and seizure
- Brigham City v. Stuart
- Powers of the police in England and Wales which describes similar police powers in the UK to enter property without a warrant
