= United States maritime law =

Body of legal rules that governs ships and shipping

Maritime law in the United States is a matter of federal law.

== Jurisdiction ==
In the United States, the federal district courts have jurisdiction over all admiralty and maritime actions.

When the U.S. Navy or Marine Corps is involved in an admiralty incident, the Secretary of the Navy has authority for administrative settlement and payment of claims involving the Department of the Navy. The Judge Advocate General processes admiralty claims for adjudication by the Secretary of the Navy, or the Secretary's designee, and acts as the principal liaison with Department of Justice for admiralty tort cases in litigation. The Navy Department may hold a Court of Inquiry or conduct other investigations into the incident; however, this type of court conducts formal investigations and "is not a court as the term is commonly used today." Whether or not such an investigation is conducted for an admiralty incident, there may be tort claims in federal court for the injured parties if they are unsatisfied with the Secretary's settlement.

In recent years a conspiracy argument used by tax protesters is that an American court displaying an American flag with a gold fringe is in fact an "admiralty court" and thus has no jurisdiction. Courts have repeatedly dismissed this argument as frivolous. In United States v. Greenstreet, the court summarized its finding to this argument: "Unfortunately for Defendant Greenstreet, decor is not a determinant for jurisdiction."

== Applicable law ==
A state court hearing an admiralty or maritime case is required to apply the admiralty and maritime law, even if it conflicts with the law of the state, under a doctrine known as the "reverse-Erie doctrine". The Erie doctrine, derived from Erie Railroad Co. v. Tompkins, directs that federal courts hearing state actions must apply state law. The "reverse-Erie doctrine" directs that state courts hearing admiralty cases must apply federal admiralty law. This distinction is critical in some cases.

For instance, U.S. maritime law recognizes the concept of joint and several liability among tortfeasors, while many states do not. Under joint and several liability, where two or more people create a single injury or loss, all are equally liable, even if they contributed only a small amount. A state court hearing an admiralty case would be required to apply the doctrine of joint and several liability even if state law does not contemplate the concept.

== Limitation of shipowner's liability ==
One of the unique aspects of maritime law is the ability of a shipowner to limit its liability to the value of a ship after a major accident. An example of the use of the Limitation Act is the sinking of the RMS Titanic in 1912. Even though the Titanic had never been to the United States, upon her sinking the owners rushed into the federal courts in New York to file a limitation of liability proceeding. The Limitation Act provides that if an accident happens due to a circumstance which is beyond the "privity and knowledge" of the ship's owners, the owners can limit their liability to the value of the ship after it sinks.

After the Titanic sank, the only portions of the ship remaining were the 14 lifeboats, which had a collective value of about $3,000. This was added to the "pending freight"—which means the ship's earnings from the trip from both passenger fares and freight charges—to reach a total liability of about $91,000. The cost of a first-class, parlor suite ticket was over $4,350. The owners of the Titanic were successful in showing that the sinking occurred without their privity and knowledge, and therefore, the families of the deceased passengers, as well as the surviving passengers who lost their personal belongings, were entitled only to split the $91,000.

Another example was when Transocean filed in the U.S. District Court for the Southern District of Texas in 2010 to limit its liability to just its interest in the Deepwater Horizon, which it valued at $26,764,083. This was in the wake of billions of dollars liabilities resulting from the Deepwater Horizon oil spill that followed the sinking.

The Limitation Act does not only apply to large ships. It can be used to insulate a motorboat owner from liability when he loans his boat to another who then has an accident. Even jet ski owners have been able to successfully invoke the Limitation Act to insulate themselves from liability. An unusual application involved the case Grubart v. Great Lakes Dredge and Dock Company, where a vessel performing piling operations in the Chicago River punctured a tunnel and caused the 1992 Chicago flood of many underground areas of the city’s downtown; the courts ruled that the vessel was in navigable waters covered by the admiralty law limitation clause.

Many shipping contracts include "safe berth" clauses that assure that the area around the intended dock is clear for the arriving vessel. This has been determined by the Supreme Court to be a warranty of safety from the entity requesting the shipping, placing the burden of clearing the area and any subsequently liability for failure to do so on that entity rather than the vessel owner, as determined in the 2020 case CITGO Asphalt Refining Co. v. Frescati Shipping Co. resulting from the oil spill on the Delaware River in 2004.

== Cargo claims ==
Claims for damage to cargo shipped by ocean carrier in international commerce into and out of the United States are governed by the Carriage of Goods by Sea Act (COGSA), which is the U.S. enactment of the Hague Rules. One of its key features is that a carrier is liable for cargo damaged from "hook to hook", meaning from loading to discharge, unless it is exonerated under one of 17 exceptions to liability, such as an "act of God", the inherent nature of the goods, errors in navigation, and management of the ship. A shipowner is generally entitled to limit its liability to $500 per package, unless the value of the contents is disclosed and marked on the container. There is significant litigation as to what constitutes a "package" for purposes of determining liability under COGSA. This practice has resulted in substantial and continuing litigation in the United States. Federal courts in the United States, however, are reluctant to treat an ocean shipping container as a single COGSA package. The statute of limitations on cargo claims is one year.

== Personal injuries to seamen ==
Seamen injured aboard ship have three possible sources of compensation: the principle of maintenance and cure, the doctrine of unseaworthiness, and the Jones Act. The principle of maintenance and cure requires a shipowner to both pay for an injured seaman's medical treatment until maximum medical recovery (MMR) is obtained and provide basic living expenses until completion of the voyage, even if the seaman is no longer aboard ship. The seaman is entitled to maintenance and cure as of right, unless he was injured due to his own willful gross negligence. It is similar in some ways to workers' compensation. The doctrine of unseaworthiness makes a shipowner liable if a seaman is injured because the ship, or any appliance of the ship, is "unseaworthy", meaning defective in some way. The Jones Act allows a sailor, or one in privity to him, to sue the shipowner in tort for personal injury or wrongful death, with trial by jury. The Jones Act incorporates the Federal Employers Liability Act (FELA), which governs injuries to railway workers, and is similar to the Coal Miners Act. A shipowner is liable to a seaman in the same way a railroad operator is to its employees who are injured due to the negligence of the employer. The statute of limitation is three years.

Not every worker injured on board a vessel is a "seaman" entitled to the protections offered by the Jones Act, doctrine of unseaworthiness, and principle of maintenance and cure. To be considered a seaman, a worker must generally spend 30% or more of his working hours onboard either a specific vessel or a fleet of vessels under common ownership or control. With few exceptions, all non-seamen workers injured over navigable waters are covered instead by the Longshore and Harbor Workers' Compensation Act, 33 U.S.C. §§ 901–950, a separate form of workers' compensation.

== Emergency expenditures ==
In the United States, U.S. individuals "evacuated on US government-coordinated transport, including charter and military flights or ships, even if those transports are provided by another country's government, must sign an Evacuee Manifest and Promissory Note (Form DS-5528) note prior to departure." This note is used as a reference, which is later used to issue a bill to these evacuees for the maximum practical reimbursement. Evacuees taking coordinated U.S. government transportation are required by law to pay the cost of reasonable commercial transport fare to the destination that was designated prior to the incident that resulted in the need for evacuation. There is an option for a repatriation loan program, which is issued by the Secretary of State in regards to 11 different requirements, including requiring a verifiable address and social security number and a written agreement with a repayment schedule from the borrower. The payment of the loan should be issued to the U.S. Department of State through the Comptroller and Global Financial Services office, in full and on time. Therefore, avoiding interest payments and other legal penalties, including the prevention of renewal or issuance of a U.S. passport.

== Agony of collision ==
The "agony of collision" is a defense to a statutory claim of negligence in ship collisions.

== See also ==
- Dock (maritime)
- General average
- List of maritime disasters
- List of oil spills
- Prize (law)
- SS Andrea Doria
- United Nations Convention on the Law of the Sea
