= List of pending United States Supreme Court cases =

This is a list of cases before the United States Supreme Court that the Court has agreed to hear and has not yet decided.

Future argument dates are in parentheses; arguments in these cases have been scheduled, but have not, and potentially may not, take place.

== October Term 2026 cases ==
Case	Docket no.	Question(s) presented	Certiorari granted	Oral argument
Anderson v. Intel Corp. Investment Policy Committee	25-498	Whether, for claims predicated on fund underperformance, pleading that an ERISA fiduciary failed to use the requisite "care, skill, prudence, or diligence" under the circumstances and thus breached ERISA's duty of prudence when investing plan assets requires alleging a "meaningful benchmark."	January 16, 2026	October 6, 2026
Apple, Inc. v. Epic Games, Inc.	25-1311	Whether a court may hold a party in civil contempt based on a violation of an injunction's "spirit" where the injunction is silent as to the conduct upon which contempt is based, as the Ninth Circuit holds; or, instead, whether a court must ground a finding of civil contempt on the violation of an order that clearly and unambiguously proscribes the precise conduct at issue, as other circuits hold.	June 30, 2026	(January 11, 2027)
Association for Education Fairness v. Montgomery County Board of Education	26-12	Whether a plaintiff challenging a facially neutral admissions policy as racially discriminatory must establish that the targeted racial group suffered an aggregate disparate impact relative to its share of the applicant pool.	October 19, 2026	
Beaird v. United States	25-5343	Whether Stinson v. United States, 508 U. S. 36 (1993), still correctly states the rule for the deference that courts must give the commentary to the Sentencing Guidelines.	April 20, 2026	October 13, 2026
Berry v. United States	25-7026	Whether a certificate of appealability under 28 U.S.C. § 2253 should be granted where the issue that the petitioner seeks to raise on appeal has been resolved against him by binding circuit precedent but has been resolved in his favor by another circuit.	October 13, 2026	
Blanche v. Ozurumba	25-1343	Whether, under 8 U.S.C. § 1182(a)(3)(B)(iv)(VI), material support to a terrorist organization must advance the organization's actual commission of terrorism to qualify the alien as removable and ineligible for various immigration benefits.	October 13, 2026	
Crowther v. Board of Regents of the University System of Georgia	25-183	Whether Title IX provides employees of federally funded educational institutions a private right of action to sue for sex discrimination in employment.	May 18, 2026	(November 30, 2026)
Department of the Air Force v. Prutehi Guahan	25-579	(1) Whether the federal government's submission to a state or territorial regulator of an application to renew a RCRA permit is "final agency action" that is immediately reviewable under the Administrative Procedure Act, 5 U.S.C. § 704. (2) Whether the federal government must comply with the general environmental-review procedures of the National Environmental Policy Act of 1969, 42 U.S.C. § 4321 et seq., before submitting a permit-renewal application under RCRA, which sets forth its own specific procedures to review environmental impacts in the context of hazardous-waste treatment.	March 9, 2026	October 7, 2026
Department of Homeland Security v. D.V.D.	26-426	(1) Whether the district court had jurisdiction over Respondents' claims. (2) Whether the district court had authority to enter classwide declaratory relief and APA vacatur under 8 U.S.C. § 1252(f)(1). (3) Whether the Government's Guidance on third-country removals is unlawful under 8 U.S.C. § 1231(b), the Due Process Clause, or FARRA/CAT and its implementing regulations.	September 29, 2026	(December 9, 2026)
Department of Justice v. McNutt	26-204	Whether the prohibition on the production of distilled spirits in particular locations, including "in any dwelling house" or "in any shed, yard, or inclosure connected with any dwelling house," 26 U.S.C. § 5178(a)(1)(B), is necessary and proper for carrying into execution Congress's enumerated power to lay and collect taxes.	October 19, 2026	
Department of Labor v. Sun Valley Orchards, LLC	25-966	(1) Whether Article III of the Constitution precludes the Department of Labor from adjudicating proceedings to collect monetary remedies from employers who have allegedly violated the terms and conditions of employment of H-2A workers and domestic workers in corresponding employment. (2) Whether 8 U.S.C. § 1188(g)(2) authorizes the Department of Labor to adjudicate proceedings to collect monetary remedies from employers who have allegedly violated the terms and conditions of employment of H-2A workers and domestic workers in corresponding employment.	April 27, 2026	November 10, 2026
Goldman Sachs Bank USA v. Brown	25-1408	Whether, and under what circumstances, a bankruptcy court may override the FAA and refuse to honor a valid arbitration agreement with respect to Section 362(k) claims.	November 6, 2026	
Grand v. City of University Heights	25-965	Whether the First Amendment's established chilling-effect doctrine, under which a credible government threat that deters the exercise of fundamental rights constitutes a complete and independently actionable constitutional injury, is displaced by Williamson Cty. Planning v. Hamilton Bank's land-use finality requirement when a plaintiff alleges that government threats both before and after a Planning Commission meeting chilled religious exercise, worship, and assembly.	June 30, 2026	(December 9, 2026)
Guerrero v. Johnson	25-1003	Whether a claim relies on a "a new rule of constitutional law, made retroactive to cases on collateral review by the Supreme Court, that was previously unavailable" when the habeas petitioner could have asserted a claim based on the rule in a prior federal habeas petition.	June 15, 2026	November 4, 2026
Hoffmann v. WBI Energy Transmission, Inc.	25-159	In private condemnations under the Natural Gas Act, should just compensation be determined by reference to state law?	June 29, 2026	November 9, 2026
International Partners for Ethical Care, Inc. v. Ferguson	25-840	Whether parents have standing to challenge a law or policy that deliberately displaces their decision-making role as to "gender transitions" of their children, and in so doing creates present and likely future impediments to their ability to parent their children as they deem best for them.	June 29, 2026	(December 7, 2026)
Johnson v. United States Congress	25-735	Did the Veterans' Judicial Review Act strip district courts of the jurisdiction, recognized by this Court in Johnson v. Robison, 415 U.S. 361 (1974), to hear challenges to the constitutionality of acts of Congress affecting veterans' benefits?	April 6, 2026	October 5, 2026
Jouppi v. Alaska	25-246	Whether, in determining whether a fine contravenes the Excessive Fines Clause, courts may consider the gravity of the underlying offense purely in the abstract or should consider the gravity of the specific defendant's wrongdoing.	July 20, 2026	(December 1, 2026)
Kian v. Florida	25-6623	Whether Petitioner was derived of his right, under the Sixth and Fourteenth Amendments, to a trial by a 12-person jury when the defendant is charged with a serious felony?	June 15, 2026	(January 13, 2027)
Marschner v. Marschner	25-1349	Does the USFSPA require state courts to refuse enforcement of indemnification provisions in divorce settlement agreements?	October 1, 2026	(January 19, 2027)
Maxwell v. Dinis	25-5930	Whether a claim regarding application of time credits under the First Step Act of 2018, 132 Stat. 5195–5208 (codified in relevant part at 18 U.S.C. § 3631–3635), seeking accelerated transfer to a halfway house or home confinement, can be brought in a habeas petition under 28 U.S.C. § 2241.	June 1, 2026	November 2, 2026
Missionaries of Saint John the Baptist, Inc. v. Frederic	25-1131	Whether a land-use regulation that prohibits a religious institution from building a religious structure on its own property constitutes a "substantial burden" on religious exercise under the Substantial Burden Provision of the Religious Land Use and Institutionalized Persons Act (RLUIPA), 42 U.S.C. § 2000cc(a).	October 1, 2026	(January 20, 2027)
Montoya Palacios v. Liggins	25-1223	Whether under the Equal Access to Justice Act, "any civil action" encompasses an action seeking a writ of habeas corpus to challenge civil immigration detention.	June 29, 2026	(January 11, 2027)
Mullin v. Refugee and Immigrant Center for Education and Legal Services	26-239	(1) Whether Presidential Proclamation No. 10,888, 90 Fed. Reg. 8333 (Jan. 29, 2025), and its implementing guidance—which suspended the entry of certain aliens and precluded their access to statutory provisions that would enable their continued presence in the country, including asylum—are lawful. (2) Whether 8 U.S.C. § 1252(f)(1) bars the classwide relief entered by the district court.	November 13, 2026	
Nielsen v. Watanabe	25-417	Whether the Ninth Circuit here erred in recognizing a Bivens cause of action.	June 22, 2026	November 9, 2026
Republican National Committee v. Mi Familia Vota	25-1017	(1) Does the National Voter Registration Act or a federal consent decree prohibit Arizona from requiring voter-registration applicants to produce "satisfactory evidence" of U.S. citizenship when registering with a state registration form? (2) Does the National Voter Registration Act prohibit Arizona from implementing a program within 90 days of a federal election to cancel the registrations of voters who are not U.S. citizens?	June 29, 2026	(December 8, 2026)
Rhoney v. Barbosa da Cunha	26-104	Whether 8 U.S.C. § 1225(b)(2)(A) mandates the detention pending removal proceedings of aliens who, like respondent, are present in the United States without having been admitted.	October 1, 2026	
RiseandShine Corp. v. PepsiCo, Inc.	24-1016	Whether trademark strength is a question of fact in a likelihood-of-confusion analysis under 15 U.S.C. § 1114.	June 29, 2026	(January 12, 2027)
Robinhood Markets, Inc. v. Sodha	25-944	Whether an issuer can be found liable under the misleading-omissions prong of Section 11(a) of the Securities Act of 1933, 15 U.S.C. § 77a et seq., based on a determination that the issuer failed to disclose interim financial information that is material within the meaning of Section 11(a), without an additional inquiry to determine whether the omission rendered any affirmative statement misleading.	November 13, 2026	
Salazar v. Paramount Global	25-459	Whether the phrase "goods or services from a video tape service provider," as used in the VPPA's definition of "consumer," refers to all of a video tape service provider's goods or services or only to its audiovisual goods or services.	January 26, 2026	October 14, 2026
St. Mary Catholic Parish v. Roy	25-581	(1) Whether proving a lack of general applicability under Employment Division v. Smith requires showing unfettered discretion or categorical exemptions for identical secular conduct. (2) Whether Carson v. Makin displaces the rule of Employment Division v. Smith only when the government explicitly excludes religious people and institutions.	April 20, 2026	November 3, 2026
Suncor Energy (U.S.A.) Inc. v. County Commissioners of Boulder County	25-170	(1) Whether federal law precludes state-law claims seeking relief for injuries allegedly caused by the effects of interstate and international greenhouse-gas emissions on the global climate. (2) Whether this Court has statutory and Article III jurisdiction to hear this case.	February 23, 2026	October 5, 2026
U.S. DOGE Service v. U.S. District Court for the District of Columbia	25-1103	(1) Whether the court of appeals' order departed from this Court's instructions and the separation-of-powers principles that this Court articulated in Cheney v. United States District Court, 542 U.S. 367 (2004). (2) Whether a court may order broad discovery against an Executive Office advisory body—potentially providing much information sought on the merits of a plaintiff's FOIA claims—to determine whether FOIA's disclosure requirements apply in the first place.	October 13, 2026	
Viramontes v. Cook County; Grant v. Higgins	25-238; 25-566	Whether the Second and Fourteenth Amendments guarantee the right to possess AR-15 platform and similar semiautomatic rifles.	June 30, 2026	(December 2, 2026)
Wassily v. Blanche	25-842	Whether noncitizens who were "granted asylum," but whose asylum was later terminated, are eligible for adjustment to LPR status under 8 U.S.C. § 1159(b) (as the Fifth Circuit held), or are categorically ineligible (as the Second and Fourth Circuits held)?	June 29, 2026	(November 30, 2026)
Younge v. Fulton Judicial Circuit District Attorney's Office	25-352	Where a defendant has filed an answer without pleading an affirmative defense, may the defendant nonetheless assert that affirmative defense as the basis for a summary judgment motion, without amending or seeking to amend its answer to plead that affirmative defense, and may a defendant do so even if an amendment adding that affirmative defense would be barred by Rule 16(b)(4)?	March 30, 2026	November 2, 2026

== See also ==
- List of United States Supreme Court cases by the Roberts Court
- 2025 term opinions of the Supreme Court of the United States
