= Apple v. Epic Games =

- Supreme Court of the United States
- Full case name: Apple Inc. v. Epic Games Inc.
- Docket no.: 25-1311

Questions presented
- Whether a court may hold a party in civil contempt based on a violation of an injunction’s 'spirit' where the injunction is silent as to the conduct upon which contempt is based, as the Ninth Circuit holds; or, instead, whether a court must ground a finding of civil contempt on the violation of an order that clearly and unambiguously proscribes the precise conduct at issue, as other circuits hold.

Apple v. Epic Games is a pending United States Supreme Court case dealing with contempt charges in a civil lawsuit.

The case extends from Epic Games v. Apple; video game publisher Epic Games claimed Apple had a monopoly with its App Store by preventing the use of third-party storefronts. Federal district judge Yvonne Gonzalez Rogers of the Northern District of California rejected most of Epic's claims, but upheld that Apple used anti-steering practices to discourage the use of alternative storefronts, and as a remedy, ordered Apple to allow third-party storefronts. The order withstood Apple's appeals.

Apple made changes to allow third-party storefronts, but still required that Apple take a revenue share of 27% of all sales through them, instead of the usual 30% for purchases via the App Store, along with additional restrictions that hampered third-party storefronts. Epic filed a motion that these changes were in contempt of Rogers' order, which she agreed with in 2025, and issued an injunction that disallowed Apple from collecting any fees from third-party storefronts until they reached a remedy that was suitable. After the Ninth Circuit declined to stay this injunction in May 2026, Apple appealed to the Supreme Court, claiming they had met the spirit of the injunction, rather than any explicit instructions given by Rogers, and thus cannot be found in contempt. The Supreme Court granted certiorari in June 2026 for the case to be heard in the 2026 term.

== Background ==
Epic Games is a video game publisher, best known for the game Fortnite. Fortnite is free to play, supported through monetization using "V-Bucks" for players to buy character skins and other customization items for their in-game avatar. Epic sells V-Bucks directly through their website or in-game store. When the company ported the game to iOS and published through Apple's App Store, they initially processed V-Buck sales through the App Store, as Apple did not allow alternative payment systems for any app. The App Store took a 30% revenue share of all purchases, a common figure used for many other video game storefronts that had reflected the cost that video game console manufacturers attached to the physical production of game media like cartridges and optical discs. Epic's CEO Tim Sweeney was critical of this value, believing that with digital distribution, the revenue share by storefronts could be much less while remaining profitable.

Epic launched "Project Liberty" in August 2020 by updating the App Store's version of Fortnite with a version that after a hotfix update, directed users to Epic's own storefront to purchase V-Bucks. Epic also took simultaneous action with Google and its Play Store at the same time, leading to legal action in Epic Games v. Google. (Note: In Epic Games v. Google, a jury trial found Google's Play Store had a monopoly on the Android operating system, and the remedy required Google to allow third-party storefronts on Android.) Apple immediately pulled the Fortnite app for violating the App Store's terms of use, which Epic had expected and allowed Epic to file suit in the United States District Court for the Northern District of California, accusing Apple of engaging in anti-competitive, monopolistic practices through the App Store. Epic did not seek monetary damages but instead judgement to coerce Apple to change its App Store policies. Judge Yvonne Gonzalez Rogers presided over the bench trial during May 2021, and in September 2021 issued her ruling. Rogers dismissed nine of the ten complaints in Epic's suit ruling in Apple's favor, but ruled for Epic that Apple's anti-steering practice, restricting apps on the App Store from linking to third-party storefronts, was anti-competitive. Rogers placed a preliminary injunction requiring Apple to lift the anti-steering provisions from the App Store. Apple appealed to the United States Court of Appeals for the Ninth Circuit, which upheld Rogers' ruling in April 2023. Apple appealed Rogers' findings to the Supreme Court, but their petition was denied.

By January 2024, Apple announced it would allow third-party storefronts to be linked from apps to comply with the injunction. However, Apple required that these storefronts share 27% of their revenue with Apple, in contrast to the App Store's 30%. Apple also required in-app warning screens to be shown before the user left the app for the third-party storefront cautioning them on privacy and security issues when using such storefronts. Epic filed a motion with Rogers that these changes were not in line with the injunction she had placed on Apple, and in April 2024, Rogers ruled that Apple's changes were willful violations of the injunction and were in contempt of court. Rogers arranged for a new trial to determine what a proper revenue share and App Store restrictions would be appropriate, placing another injunction that Apple must continue to allow third-party storefronts but denied them the ability to collect any revenue shares from those stores.

Apple appealed on the basis of this new injunction to the Ninth Circuit as well as seeking an emergency stay of the injunction. The Ninth Circuit denied Apple the emergency stay, and after a hearing, ruled in early 2026 that the new injunction should be kept while the district trial over proper remedies proceeded.

== Supreme Court ==
On the Ninth Circuit's ruling upholding the injunction preventing Apple from collecting revenue shares from third-party storefronts, Apple sought an emergency stay and petitioned the Supreme Court to hear its appeal regarding the finding of contempt by Rogers. Apple contended that its changes to its third-party storefront policy did not violate the spirit of Rogers' initial injunction rather than any express provision of the injunction, and thus cannot be found in contempt, as has been ruled in other federal circuit courts. The Supreme Court denied the emergency stay in May 2026, but on the final day of the 2025 term, the Court granted certiorari to Apple's petition, setting their case to be heard during the 2026 term. The Court opted not to decide on Apple's request that the injunction preventing collecting revenue from third-party storefronts be limited to just Epic Games.
