= Beaird v. United States =

- Supreme Court of the United States
- Full case name: Kendrick Jarrell Beaird, Petitioner v. United States
- Docket no.: 25-5343

Questions presented
- Whether Stinson v. United States still correctly states the rule for the deference that courts must give the commentary to the Sentencing Guidelines.

Beaird v. United States (No. 25-5343) is a pending United States Supreme Court case. The Court has been asked to identify the appropriate level of deference owed to the commentary to the United States Sentencing Guidelines.

== Background ==
In 1984, Congress created the United States Sentencing Commission. Structured as an independent agency within the judicial branch, the Sentencing Commission comprises seven members, nominated by the President and confirmed by the Senate, who serve for terms of six years. The Sentencing Commission publishes the United States Sentencing Guidelines, which prescribe a uniform framework for determining the sentences of those convicted of crimes in federal courts. A judge will calculate a defendant's "offense level", ranging from 1 to 43, given the particular facts of the crime, and a "criminal history category", ranging from I to VI, depending on the defendant's prior criminal activity. Using those two numbers, the sentencing judge will cross-reference a table in the Sentencing Guidelines Manual to determine the defendant's guidelines sentence range. Formally, the guidelines are not mandatory. However, sentencing judges are nevertheless required to correctly calculate a defendant's guidelines sentence range, and explain any deviation therefrom.

In drafting new guidelines, the Sentencing Commission will first draft its proposed amendments to the existing guidelines. Proposed comments are published in the Federal Register, and are subject to notice and comment by the public. A quorum of at least four voting commissioners must approve the amendment. Once the amendment is approved, it is transmitted to Congress, which has roughly 180 days to act on the proposed amendment. Congress may modify the proposed amendment by statute, reject the amendment, or allow it to take effect. The amendment will take effect on its specified effective date (typically November 1), and will be incorporated into the next edition of the Guidelines Manual.

In addition to the Sentencing Guidelines themselves, the Sentencing Commission also produces its own commentary to the guidelines. The commentary to the Sentencing Guidelines is written to offer the Sentencing Commission's interpretation of text in the Sentencing Guidelines, define terms, provide application notes, or give examples. Unlike amendments to the Sentencing Guidelines, amendments to the commentary are not subject to the statutory 180-day congressional review period.

In Stinson v. United States (1993), the Supreme Court held that:

The Guidelines Manual's commentary which interprets or explains a guideline is authoritative unless it violates the Constitution or a federal statute, or is inconsistent with, or a plainly erroneous reading of, that guideline.

— Stinson v. United States, 508 U.S. 36 (1993).

In so holding, the Court relied on its decision in Bowles v. Seminole Rock & Sand Co. (1945), which governs an agency's interpretations of its own legislative rule. In Kisor v. Wilkie (2019), the Court announced limitations on Seminole Rock. Kisor holds that an agency's interpretation of its own regulation is not entitled to deference until a reviewing court has "exhaust[ed] all the 'traditional tools' of construction," and only if the regulation thereafter remains "genuinely ambiguous," and that the "court must carefully consider the text, structure, history, and purpose of a regulation, in all the ways it would if it had no agency to fall back on."

== Lower court history ==
In 2023, Kendrick Jarrell Beaird was indicted in the United States District Court for the Northern District of Texas on a single count of being a felon in possession of a firearm, in violation of 18 U.S.C. § 922(g)(1). In the district court, Beaird unsuccessfully challenged § 922(g)(1) on Commerce Clause and Second Amendment grounds, after which he pleaded guilty. The district court applied an enhanced base offense level of 22, after counting the 17-round magazine attached to the gun at the time of the offense as a "large capacity magazine." The commentary to the Sentencing Guidelines defined "large capacity magazine" as one capable of holding more than 15 rounds of ammunition. Beaird objected, arguing that the commentary improperly expanded the scope of the guideline. The district court overruled Beaird's objection, and settled on a final base offense level of 22. After deducting three points for acceptance of responsibility, the court settled on a final offense level of 19. Together with a criminal history category of VI, this yielded a final guidelines sentence range of 63–78 months imprisonment.

Beaird appealed to the United States Court of Appeals for the Fifth Circuit. On appeal, he challenged the constitutionality of his conviction under the Commerce Clause and Second Amendment, along with the district court's calculation of his guidelines range. Finding each argument foreclosed by existing Fifth Circuit precedent, the Court of Appeals affirmed on May 15, 2025.

== Supreme Court ==
On August 11, 2025, Beaird petitioned the Supreme Court for a writ of certiorari. In his petition, Beaird sought review on his Second Amendment, Commerce Clause, and Sentencing Guidelines arguments. On April 20, 2026, the Supreme Court granted review, limited to Beaird's Sentencing Guidelines claim. The case was argued during the Supreme Court's October 2026 Term, with a decision expected by July 2027.
