= Kian v. Florida =

- Supreme Court of the United States
- Full case name: Hamed Kian, Petitioner v. Florida
- Docket no.: 25-6623

Case history
- Prior: Conviction affirmed. Kian v. State, 421 So. 3d 439 (Fla. 4th DCA 2025).; Cert. granted. 608 U.S. ___ (2026).

Questions presented
- Whether Petitioner was deprived of his right, under the Sixth and Fourteenth Amendments, to a trial by a 12-person jury when the defendant is charged with a serious felony?

Kian v. Florida, No. 25-6623, is a pending United States Supreme Court case. The Court will consider whether the Sixth and Fourteenth Amendments guarantee the right to a trial by a 12-person jury in prosecutions for serious felonies.

== Background ==
=== Legal background ===
In Williams v. Florida, 399 U.S. 78 (1970), the Supreme Court held that the use of a six-member jury in a criminal trial did not violate the Sixth Amendment. In reaching this conclusion, the Court held that:

The relevant inquiry, as we see it, must be the function that the particular feature performs and its relation to the purposes of the jury trial. Measured by this standard, the 12-man requirement cannot be regarded as an indispensable component of the Sixth Amendment.

— Williams, 399 U.S., at 99-100.

Two years later in Apodaca v. Oregon, 406 U.S. 404 (1972), a plurality of the Supreme Court held that the Sixth Amendment, as applied to the States through the Fourteenth Amendment, did not require unanimous jury verdicts in state criminal trials. Recalling Williams, the Court noted that:

Our inquiry must focus upon the function served by the jury in contemporary society. Cf. Williams v. Florida, supra, at 99-100.

— Apodaca, 406 U.S., at 410.

Decades later, the Supreme Court reconsidered Apodaca in Ramos v. Louisiana, 590 U.S. 83 (2020). In Ramos, the Court overturned Apodaca, holding that the Sixth Amendment—as incorporated against the states by way of the Fourteenth Amendment—requires a unanimous verdict to convict a defendant of a serious offense. In so holding, the Court distanced itself from the functionalist analysis that Apodaca derived from Williams:

Our real objection here isn't that the Apodaca plurality's cost-benefit analysis was too skimpy. The deeper problem is that the plurality subjected the ancient guarantee of a unanimous jury verdict to its own functionalist assessment in the first place.

— Ramos, 590 U.S., at 100.

=== Factual background ===
Florida is one of six states that allows defendants charged with serious offenses to be tried before juries of fewer than twelve members. Section 930.10 of the Florida Statutes provides that "[t]welve persons shall constitute a jury to try all capital cases, and six persons shall constitute a jury to try all other criminal cases." In April 2022, petitioner Hamed Kian was charged with five counts of practicing chiropractic medicine without a license, a non-capital offense. Pursuant to Florida law, the trial court empaneled a petit jury consisting of six members. Following the evidentiary phase of the trial, the jury unanimously found Kian guilty on all five counts in October 2023. On appeal, the Florida Fourth District Court of Appeal summarily affirmed Kian's convictions on October 16, 2025.

== Supreme Court ==
On January 9, 2026, Kian petitioned the Supreme Court for a writ of certiorari. On June 15, the Court granted review. The case will be argued during the Supreme Court's October 2026 Term, with a decision expected by mid-2027.
