= Epic Games v. Apple =

2020 U.S. lawsuit

- Court: United States District Court for the Northern District of California
- Full case name: Epic Games, Inc. v. Apple Inc.
- Argued: May 3–24, 2021
- Decided: September 10, 2021

Holding
- While Apple is not considered a monopoly and did not engage in antitrust behavior on nine of ten counts, Apple's conduct in enforcing anti-steering restrictions is anticompetitive.

Court membership
- Judge sitting: Yvonne Gonzalez Rogers

Epic Games, Inc. v. Apple Inc. was a lawsuit brought by Epic Games against Apple in August 2020 in the United States District Court for the Northern District of California, related to Apple's practices in the iOS App Store. Epic Games specifically had challenged Apple's restrictions on apps from having other in-app purchasing methods outside of the one offered by the App Store. Epic Games's founder Tim Sweeney had previously challenged the 30% revenue cut that Apple takes on each purchase made in the App Store, and with their game Fortnite, wanted to either bypass Apple or have Apple take less of a cut. Epic implemented changes in Fortnite intentionally on August 13, 2020, to bypass the App Store payment system, prompting Apple to block the game from the App Store and leading to Epic filing its lawsuit. Apple filed a countersuit, asserting Epic purposely breached its terms of contract with Apple to goad it into action, and defended itself from Epic's suit.

The trial ran from May 3 to May 24, 2021. In a September 2021 ruling in the first part of the case, Judge Yvonne Gonzalez Rogers decided in favor of Apple on nine of ten counts, but found against Apple on its anti-steering policies under the California Unfair Competition Law. Rogers prohibited Apple from stopping developers from informing users of other payment systems within apps. Both Epic and Apple appealed the judgement, but in April 2023 the Ninth Circuit Court of Appeal in large part affirmed the District Court's decision. In January 2024, the Supreme Court denied the full appeals of both Apple and Epic in the case, leaving the case primarily a victory for Apple in allowing them to continue restricting app distribution to their App Store and to continue restricting in-app purchases to Apple's payment systems, but requiring Apple to allow developers to link to external websites offering alternate payment options (off-app purchases).

While Apple implemented App Store policies to allow developers to link to alternative payment options, the policies still required the developer to provide a 27% revenue share back to Apple, and heavily restricted how they could be shown in apps. Epic filed complaints that these changes violated the ruling, and in April 2025 Rogers found for Epic that Apple had willfully violated her injunction, placing further restrictions on Apple including banning them from collecting revenue shares from non-Apple payment methods or imposing any restrictions on links to such alternative payment options. Though Apple is appealing this latest ruling, they approved the return of Fortnite with its third-party payment system to the App Store in May 2025. The Supreme Court granted certiorari to Apple's appeal, to be heard as Apple v. Epic Games in the 2026 term.

Epic also filed another lawsuit, Epic Games v. Google, the same day, which challenges Google's similar practices on the Google Play app store for Android, after Google pulled Fortnite following the update for similar reasons as Apple. However, that case centered more on the practices and deals that Google, as a dominant tech giant, wielded over partners to assure use of the Play Store. In December 2023, a jury ruled against Google in that it had unlawfully maintained its monopoly on the Android environment.

== Background ==
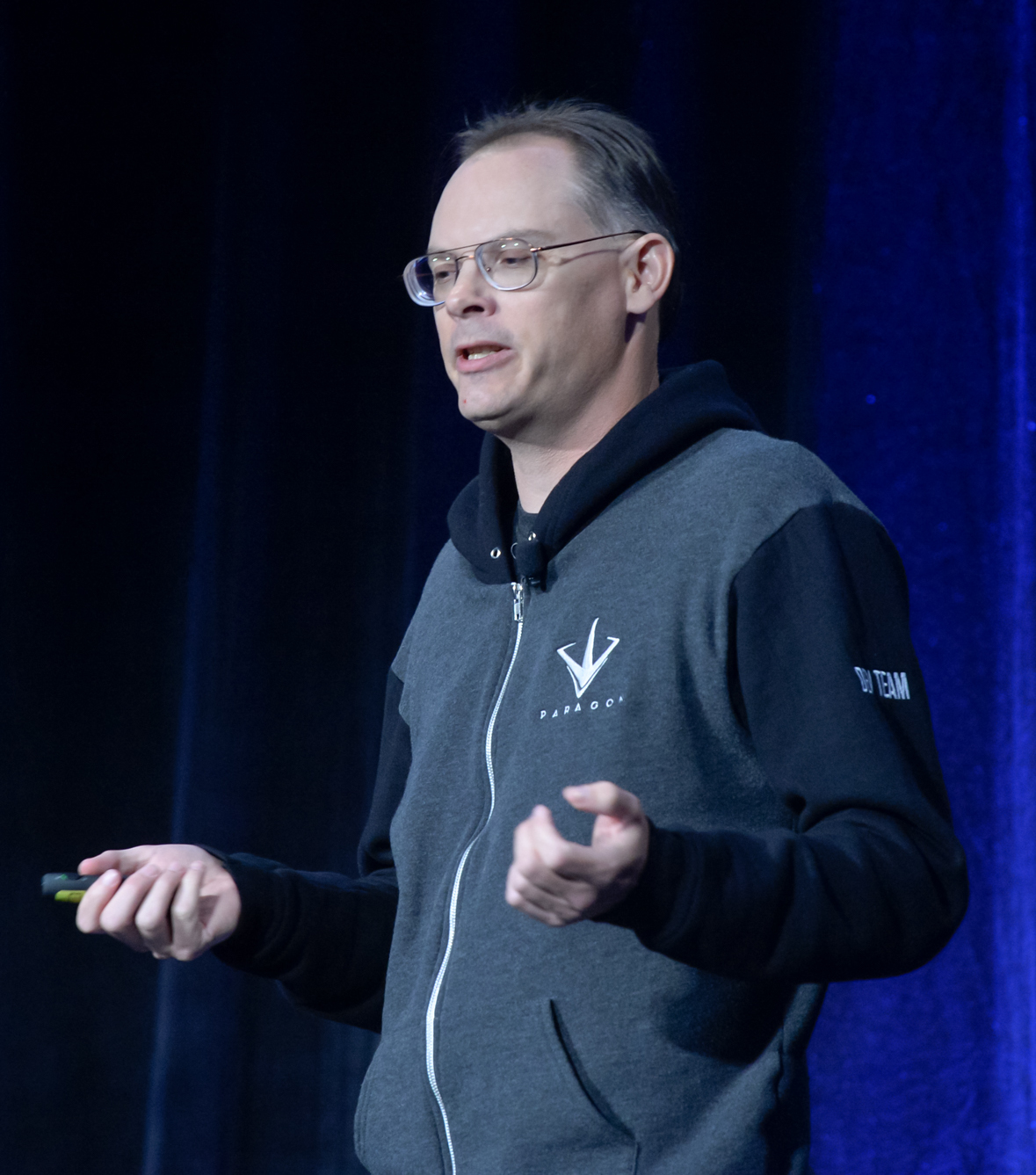
Epic Games's founder and CEO Tim Sweeney

Since 2015, Epic Games's founder and CEO Tim Sweeney had questioned the need for digital storefronts like Valve's Steam, Apple's App Store for iOS devices, and Google Play, to take a 30% revenue sharing cut, and argued that when accounting for current rates of content distribution and other factors needed, a revenue cut of 8% should be sufficient to run any digital storefront profitably. While a 30% revenue cut was an industry standard across computers, consoles, and mobile platforms in 2019, Sweeney stated that higher revenue shares made sense on consoles where "there's enormous investment in hardware, often sold below cost, and marketing campaigns in broad partnership with publishers", but did not extend to open platforms like mobile devices and personal computers. Part of the reasoning for creating the Epic Games Store was to demonstrate that Epic could operate at a lower commission percentage than 30%, using a 12% rate.

As Fortnite expanded from personal computers to other platforms with the popularity of the Battle Royale mode in 2018, Epic Games sought to bring the free-to-play game to mobile devices. When Epic first released its Android client, it offered it as a sideloaded package, rather than as a Google Play store app, as they did not want Google to take any revenue from the microtransactions in the game. However, this resulted in a number of security concerns and numerous unscrupulous clones attempting to pass themselves off as the real Fortnite game in the Google Play store, and by April 2020, Epic discontinued the sideloaded version and placed the game on the Google Play store. As Apple does not allow sideloading on iOS devices, Epic had just released the client on the App Store directly in 2018.

In mid-2020, Sweeney reiterated his stance on the 30% revenue cut that Apple and Google took, ahead of a large United States Congressional hearing investigating antitrust charges on Big Tech companies, including Google, and during similar investigations of Apple in the European Union. Sweeney said in a July CNBC interview that "Apple has locked down and crippled the ecosystem by inventing an absolute monopoly on the distribution of software, on the monetization of software", and "Google essentially intentionally stifles competing stores by having user interface barriers and obstruction". Sweeney further stated that "If every developer could accept their own payments and avoid the 30% tax by Apple and Google we could pass the savings along to all our consumers and players would get a better deal on items. And you'd have economic competition." After Apple stated that cloud gaming services like Microsoft's xCloud were not allowed on the iOS platform as they would allow content that bypassed Apple's content review, Sweeney wrote "Apple has outlawed the metaverse. The principle they state, taken literally, would rule out all cross-platform ecosystems and games with user created modes: not just xCloud, Stadia, and GeForce NOW, but also Fortnite, Minecraft, and Roblox."

Apple has argued that the 30% cut it takes through In-App Purchases (IAP) "reflects the immense value of the App Store" and beyond the visible features it offers developers, that cut covers "Apple's technology, tools, software for app development and testing, marketing efforts, platinum-level customer service, and distribution of developers' apps and digital content." Apple has further argued that it requires iOS apps to use its storefront to "ensure that iOS apps meet Apple's high standards for privacy, security, content, and quality" and avoid exposing iOS users to risks from alternative storefronts.

Legal review of the cases identify the key issue as whether Apple's control of the iOS App Store is a monopoly or not. Epic Games has argued that Apple maintains a monopoly for iOS-enabled devices, and thus its behavior in restricting alternative payment systems and storefronts are anticompetitive. Apple contends that the marketplace that Epic participates in is multi-platform, rather than just iOS, and from that perspective Apple does not have a monopoly.

== Onset of legal action ==
In an interview with CNN, Sweeney stated that Epic planned out a course of action over several months prior to August 2020, codenamed "Project Liberty", aimed to force Apple and Google's hands, either to alter their store policies or to initiate legal action.

As determined through the course of the trial, Epic initiated "Project Liberty" by first introducing a standard patch to Fortnite that had to be approved by Apple and Google, but which had secretly contained code that would allow users to be able to purchase the in-game currency, "V-Bucks", directly from Epic. Epic did not make mention of this feature to Apple or Google, so the patch was approved. Then, on August 13, 2020, Epic released a hotfix (which did not require prior approval) to the mobile versions, triggering visibility of this purchasing option. At the same time, Epic announced for all platforms that purchases of V-Bucks directly through Epic would be discounted by 20%. For iOS and Android users, Epic cautioned users that if they purchased through the Apple or Google storefront, they were not given this discount, as Epic said they could not extend the discount due to the 30% revenue cut taken by Apple and Google.

Within hours of this hotfix going live, both Apple and Google had removed Fortnite from their storefronts stating the means of bypassing their payment systems violated their terms of service. Epic immediately filed separate lawsuits against Apple and Google for antitrust and anticompetitive behavior in the United States District Court for the Northern District of California. In 2019, Epic retained Cravath, Swaine & Moore and its tandem lawsuits were represented by Katherine B. Forrest and led by the chair of its antitrust division, Christine A. Varney, former lead of the Antitrust Division of the U.S. Department of Justice under the Obama administration. Apple was represented in the suits by Gibson, Dunn & Crutcher partner Mark Perry.

On the day the lawsuit was filed, Epic released a video called "Nineteen Eighty-Fortnite", parodying Apple's "1984" advertisement using Fortnite assets, which Epic points out in their lawsuit had been used by Apple then to challenge the weight of IBM at the time. In its suit against Apple, Epic accused Apple of antitrust behavior with its practices around the App Store and its payment system, charging that these were in violation of the federal Sherman Act and the California Cartwright Act. In its suit against Google, Epic challenged Google's past mantra of "Don't be evil" and claimed that its practices around the Google Play store and its payment system violate the Sherman Act and California's Cartwright Act. Epic stated that Google's restrictions on the Android system interfered with deals for pre-loading Fortnite on phones from OnePlus and LG. They state in the claim "Notwithstanding its promises to make Android devices open to competition, Google has erected contractual and technological barriers that foreclose competing ways of distributing apps to Android users, ensuring that the Google Play Store accounts for nearly all the downloads of apps from app stores on Android devices."

Epic did not seek monetary damages in either case, but instead was "seeking injunctive relief to allow fair competition in these two key markets that directly affect hundreds of millions of consumers and tens of thousands, if not more, of third-party app developers." In comments on social media the next day, Sweeney said that they undertook the actions as "we're fighting for the freedom of people who bought smartphones to install apps from sources of their choosing, the freedom for creators of apps to distribute them as they choose, and the freedom of both groups to do business directly. The primary opposing argument is: 'Smartphone markers can do whatever they want.' This as an awful notion.[sic] We all have rights, and we need to fight to defend our rights against whoever would deny them."

Google, in response to the lawsuit, stated to The Verge that "For game developers who choose to use the Play Store, we have consistent policies that are fair to developers and keep the store safe for users. While Fortnite remains available on Android, we can no longer make it available on Play because it violates our policies. However, we welcome the opportunity to continue our discussions with Epic and bring Fortnite back to Google Play."

By August 17, 2020, Apple had informed Epic that it would terminate its access to developers accounts and tools for the App Store and iOS and macOS by August 28, 2020. This led Epic to file a motion for a preliminary injunction to block this as well as prevent Apple from delisting Fortnite from the App Store, asserting that lack of access to the development tools for iOS and macOS would affect Unreal Engine development and subsequently impact all developers that used the engine. Apple stated in response to the request for preliminary injunction that Epic had approached them in June to ask for a special deal for Epic to operate Fortnite on the App Store to allow users to pay Epic directly, and when Apple had failed to grant them this, Epic had contacted them prior to updating the version on August 13, 2020, to state they were willingly going to violate the App Store terms. Apple further requested the court deny Epic the preliminary junction, calling the "emergency" situation one that Epic had created itself. Sweeney stated in response that as his emails in Apple's complaint said, he was looking for Apple to extend to this type of exemption to all iOS developers and not just for Epic Games. Epic filed a response to Apple's complaint with support of Microsoft, specifically asking the court to block Apple from taking away its iOS development tool access as this would impact all developers that have used the Unreal Engine. Microsoft wrote in their support, "Denying Epic access to Apple's SDK and other development tools will prevent Epic from supporting Unreal Engine on iOS and macOS and will place Unreal Engine and those game creators that have built, are building, and may build games on it at a substantial disadvantage."

On August 24, 2020, after a court hearing Judge Yvonne Gonzalez Rogers granted Epic's request to prevent Apple from taking away its developer licenses for iOS and macOS, but did not grant the preliminary injunction to overturn Apple's decision to remove Fortnite from the iOS store. Rogers wrote that the removal of the developers licenses had "potential significant damage to both the Unreal Engine platform itself, and to the gaming industry generally" and Apple "has chosen to act severely" in threatening that step. On terms of Fortnite, Rogers agreed with Apple that "Epic Games has not yet demonstrated irreparable harm. The current predicament appears of its own making." Subsequently, Apple terminated Epic's iOS developer account on August 28, 2020, thereby preventing the company from uploading further material to the App Store but otherwise still being able to develop for the platform.

Prior to the first hearing on September 28, 2020, Epic filed paperwork ahead of the hearing in which they intend to seek a preliminary injunction to require Apple to rehost Fortnite.

=== Countersuit ===
Apple filed a countersuit against Epic on September 8, 2020. Apple asserted in their suit that Epic breached their contract and was seeking to block the use of Epic's payment system from any app, including Fortnite, on the iOS storefront, and sought monetary damages to recover funds that Epic had made while their version of Fortnite was active on August 13, 2020. Apple called Epic's suit an attempt "to be part of a marketing campaign designed to reinvigorate interest in Fortnite". Judge Rogers dismissed Apple's monetary claims of theft in November 2020, stating that the claims cannot be considered "independently wrongful" of the breach of contract claims, leaving these breach claims otherwise in place.

== District court ==
=== Preliminary hearing ===
At the first court hearing on the matter on September 28, 2020, Judge Rogers appeared likely to deny Epic's demand to require Apple to rehost Fortnite on the App Store unless Epic conforms to the App Store policy, consistent with Apple's argument that Epic itself had created the situation leading to its removal, but otherwise ready to maintain the restraining order related to the Unreal Engine and Epic's developer accounts. Judge Rogers indicated that she was in favor of a jury trial when the case would be heard, then expected to be in July 2021, stating during the hearing "I think it's important enough to understand what real people think. Do these security issues concern people or not? Are the concerns of the developers incredibly important? I think many people would feel it is. I do think that this is something for which jury insights would be important."

In post-hearing filings, both Epic and Apple argued that the case should be decided by a judge rather than a jury. Judge Rogers agreed, scheduling a bench trial to commence in May 2021. In October 2020, Judge Rogers denied Epic Games's request for a temporary injunction that would require Apple to allow Fortnite in its current state (with Epic's storefront), but made permanent the injunction preventing Apple from terminating Epic's developer accounts such that it could continue to maintain the Unreal Engine for iOS and macOS systems. In her decision, Rogers stated that a key aspect of her review of the case would be Epic's contention that the App Store is unique and its arguments as to why Apple's antitrust behavior is limited to the App Store and not to the other closed systems such as Xbox Live, PlayStation Store or the Nintendo eShop. Rogers said that "a final decision should be better informed regarding the impact of the walled garden model given the potential for significant and serious ramifications for Sony, Nintendo and Microsoft and their video game platforms."

=== Pre-trial ===
Facebook stated in December 2020 that it will fully support Epic Games in the lawsuit during its discovery phase. Facebook itself had been in prior conflict with Apple over its App Store policies and had amassed its own collection of information they plan to share with Epic.

As part of its case, Apple had attempted to subpoena records from Valve related to several hundred games and their sales on Steam, given that Steam is a direct competitor to Epic Games's storefront in the personal computer space. Valve declined to comply with these requests, arguing that Apple's requests are overly broad and unrelated to their complaint with Epic. The judge ruled in Apple's favor, stating that Valve was not the only target of Apple's subpoenas seeking similar storefront data, and thus the request was not unreasonable.

=== Trial ===
The trial commenced on May 3, 2021. Due to the nature of the case, Judge Gonzalez Rogers required that all parties be physically present at the court, with additional steps made to account for safety due to the ongoing COVID-19 pandemic. The trial ran for three weeks, with testimony ending on May 21, 2021 and closing arguments given on May 24, 2021. The law firm Cravath, Swaine & Moore represented Epic Games while Gibson, Dunn & Crutcher represented Apple.

Among aspects covered by the trial included:

- Epic Games and Apple discussed whether other apps such as Minecraft and Roblox should be defined as "games" or "metaverses". Though they agreed that Minecraft is a game, they disagreed over how to define Roblox. Epic argued that Roblox, like Fortnite, is a metaverse, while Apple argued that Roblox is a singular game and that games within it are "experiences", comparable to individual worlds within Minecraft. As a result, in May 2021, Roblox immediately altered its branding to remove the word "game" from its website, replacing it with "experience" in an effort to comply with Apple's app store policies.

- Apple defended its curation of content on the iOS app store, a restriction that had previously prevented cloud gaming services like GeForce Now or Google Stadia from offering a direct app on the iOS store, as each game would require approval by Apple under Apple's rules but would allow for these services to be offered through a progressive web application run through Safari or Chrome. Apple pointed to the recent addition of itch.io, an indie game storefront, to the Epic Game Store, stating that as itch.io lacked any type of moderation of content, this had allowed the Epic Game Store to effectively include a large amount of mature and adult content that was otherwise disallowed by Epic's own store guidelines, while Apple's policies require moderation of app-by-app content to prevent such a situation. Epic pointed out that it only distributed the itch.io client and was not responsible for any of the games that the client itself distributed or sold.

- Apple's anti-steering policies, which prevent any app from directing or informing its users to a different storefront outside of Apple's iOS one to make purchases, were brought into question as related to potential antitrust charges. Anti-steering policies had been deemed acceptable in practice in the 2018 U.S. Supreme Court case Ohio v. American Express Co. as long as no harm was shown to either side of the two-sided market in considering the absence of anti-steering policies. Epic attempted to argue that with Apple banning developers from directing users to alternative payment systems and storefronts, they were taking a larger share of app revenues, and thus that these anti-steering provisions should be eliminated from Apple's policies.

During the trial, a number of documents that were part of evidence collected by Epic and Apple were made public during proceedings, some containing confidential information related to third parties. Some of these documents were meant to be sealed but were instead misplaced into online public court records, and revealed some of the past inner workings of the video game industry, in addition to details on Epic's financials related to the Epic Game Store. This included Epic previously approaching Sony Interactive Entertainment in early 2018 to try to convince them to allow for cross-platform play on the PlayStation consoles; Epic approaching Microsoft to try to get them to allow free-to-play games to be played on the Xbox consoles without the need for an Xbox Live Gold paid subscription; and an unannounced game streaming service planned by Walmart. Judge Rogers took steps after the second day to try to make sure that appropriately sealed documents were kept out of the online public records.

=== Decision ===
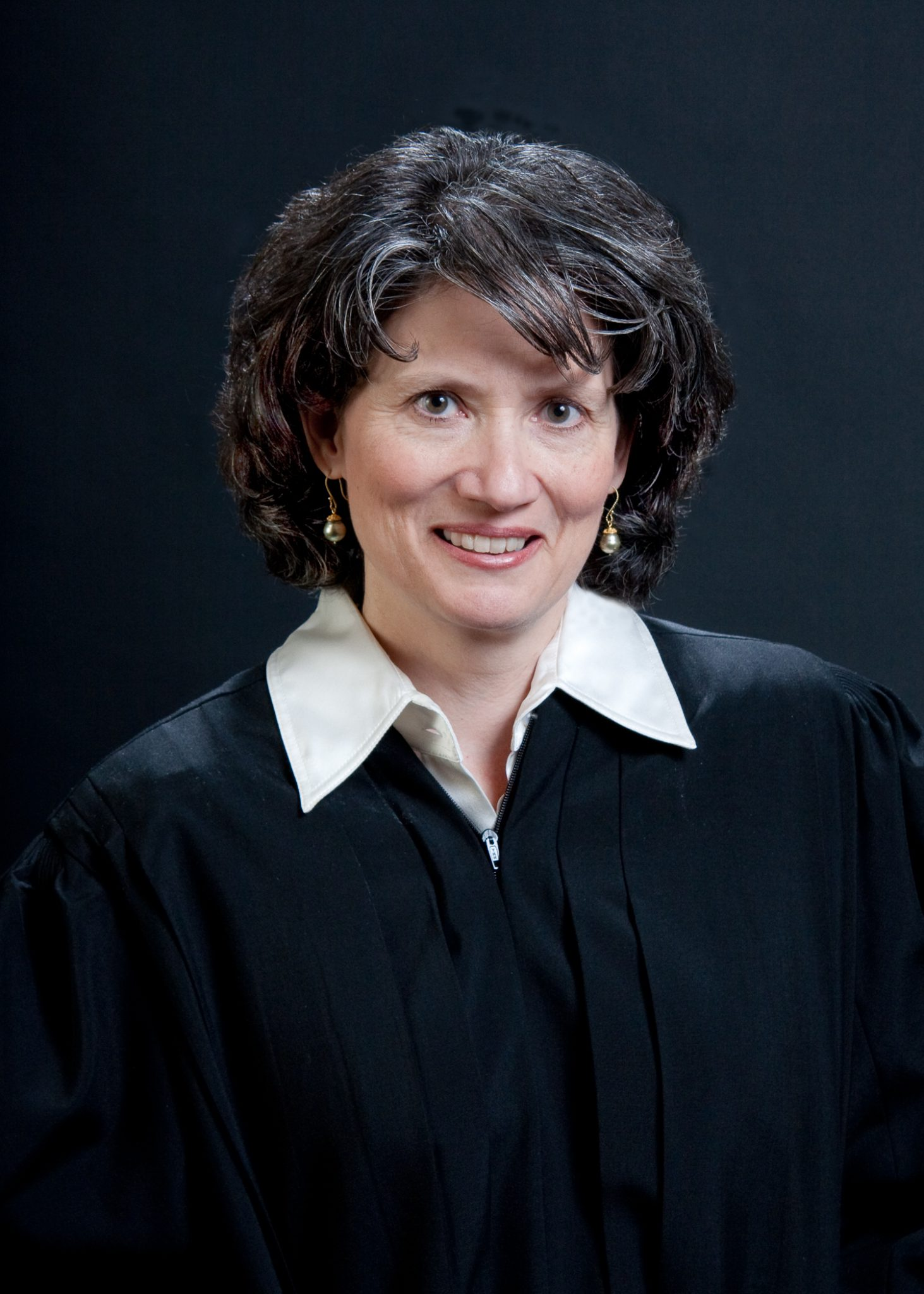
Judge Yvonne Gonzalez Rogers oversaw proceedings at the District Court.

Judge Rogers issued her first ruling on September 10, 2021, which was considered a split decision by law professor Mark Lemley. Rogers found in favor of Apple on nine of ten counts brought up against them in the case, including Epic's charges related to Apple's 30% revenue cut and Apple's prohibition against third-party marketplaces on the iOS environment. Rogers did rule against Apple on the final charge related to anti-steering provisions, and issued a permanent injunction that, in 90 days from the ruling, blocked Apple from preventing developers from linking app users to other storefronts from within apps to complete purchases or from collecting information within an app, such as an email, to notify users of these storefronts.

In her decision, Rogers identified that the market of concern was neither games (Apple's stance) nor Apple's App Store (Epic's stance) but digital mobile gaming transactions. Rogers identified that the demographics for mobile games was far different from computer or console games, and mobile games most often use the freemium payment model in which games are offered for free on the App Store but include additional features, such as cosmetic features or power-up bonuses, available for purchase, making this particular market sufficiently different from the overall video game market. Under this market definition, Judge Rogers concluded that Apple was not a monopoly and mostly a duopoly alongside Google, with potential competition to come from Nintendo and Google Stadia, and while Apple "enjoys considerable market share of over 55% and extraordinary high profit margins", that type of success was not an illegal monopoly. In this light, Judge Rogers ruled that Epic had failed to show that Apple violated federal or state antitrust laws, but ruled that Apple did violate the California Unfair Competition Law through the anti-competitive behavior of disallowing any mention of other payment systems within apps.

In line with Epic's arguments, Rogers identified that some of Apple's practices may be of concern due to the lack of competition in the digital game purchases market, but as having determined that Apple was not a monopoly, could not take immediate action to remedy. Rogers stated that the lack of competition in this area was of concern and that Apple only seemed to be motivated to innovate or change its App Store policies when subject to litigation. Rogers believed that the 30% revenue cut that Apple charges may be "unjustified" relative to the value they offer, but without significant competition to compare alternate schemes, she could not make any direct order on this. Rogers did write that "The point is that a third-party app store could put pressure on Apple to innovate by providing features that Apple has neglected." However, she disagreed with Epic's stance that Apple should not require apps to include the IAP feature for payment features, stating that Apple has a right to take some fee for licensing its intellectual property to developers. Rogers agreed with Apple that there was a valid interest in their policies to require oversight on app approval for the App Store for security purposes, which Epic had argued was used to shut down app approvals. However, Rogers did not fully accept Apple's argument that app review had to be tied directly to app distribution as the only means to prevent malware and other security issues, believing that more app reviewers would help separate these functions within the App Store.

Judge Rogers also ruled against Epic, requiring them to pay Apple $3.6 million, 30% of the revenue that was withheld to Apple related to their attempts to bypass the App Store, and further stated that Epic did violate its contractual terms as a developer with Apple in how they deployed the update to Fortnite in August 2020 that instigated events, such that Apple may block Epic in the future from providing apps to the App Store. Rogers stated that Apple's single offense against California's law was not sufficiently severe to justify Epic's rulebreaking.

== Appeals ==
On the day of Rogers's decision, a representative for Apple stated that "Today the Court has affirmed what we've known all along: the App Store is not in violation of antitrust law." However, in October 2021, Apple filed an appeal of the decision, seeking to overturn the preliminary injunction related to anti-steering practices which was due to go into effect in December 2021. Apple claimed the injunction was no longer necessary as they were planning on deleting the anti-steering provisions from their AUP as a result of the settlement from a separate lawsuit, Cameron v. Apple, completed in August 2021. Judge Rogers denied a stay of the injunction related to the anti-steering provisions in November 2021, requiring Apple to comply by December 9, 2021, 90 days from the initial order. The Ninth Circuit issued a stay on the portion of Judge Rogers's order related to provide in-app links to alternate payment systems on December 8, 2021, ruling that Apple had shown likelihood to succeed on their appeal, though the order requiring Apple to allow apps to communicate to users about such payment systems outside of the app was upheld.

Epic Games's Sweeney stated that the decision "isn't a win for developers or for consumers", that Epic would not be bringing Fortnite back to iOS until "Epic can offer in-app payment in fair competition with Apple in-app payment, passing along the savings to consumers", and that they would continue to litigate on this matter. Epic filed notice of its appeal to the Ninth Circuit on September 12, 2021, challenging Judge Rogers's conclusion that Apple was not a monopoly. Following their appeal on September 22, Sweeney stated that Apple had told Epic they would not let Fortnite back onto the App Store until the completion of all litigation related to the suit, which Sweeney later believed that this particular process would take "a minimum of five years, if not more", thereby prolonging the lawsuit until 2026.

A coalition of 35 states, Microsoft, the Electronic Frontier Foundation, and several other groups filed amicus briefs in support of Epic's position, arguing that Apple held a monopoly and thus that Epic should prevail in its lawsuit.

Court hearings for the appeals began on November 14, 2022, in the Ninth Circuit.

The Ninth Circuit issued its opinion on April 24, 2023. The three judge panel all agreed that the lower court ruling should be upheld. However, the Ninth Circuit agreed to stay the injunction requiring Apple to allow links to third-party payment options in July 2023, allowing time for Apple to submit its appeal to the Supreme Court. Both Apple and Epic Games appealed this decision to the Supreme Court. Justice Elena Kagan declined Epic's emergency request to lift the Ninth Circuit's stay in August 2023.

On January 16, 2024, the Supreme Court declined to hear the appeals from Apple and Epic in the case.

== Enforcement ==
With the Supreme Court's refusal to hear either appeal, the case concluded with Apple prevailing on nine of the ten counts, while being found liable only for its anti-steering restrictions. To implement this, Apple allowed developers to include "metadata buttons, external links, or other calls to action that direct customers to purchasing mechanisms", but required that developers give Apple 27% of all sales made within seven days of being directed to these sites, which Apple described as a "reasonable means to account for the substantial value Apple provides developers, including in facilitating linked transactions". In addition, the App Store posts a warning screen stating that Apple is not responsible for any security or privacy issues related to third-party payment systems when clicking through to one of these systems.

Sweeney stated that these changes are in bad faith compliance with the court orders, maintaining a 27% anti-competitive tax and a "scare screen" that are intended to dissuade developers from using third-party payment systems. Epic filed its request to Rogers in March 2024 to enforce the anti-steering provision that she had outlined for Apple. Rogers ruled in April 2025 that Apple "willfully" failed to comply with her previous injunctions, and further extended these injunctions to prevent Apple from collecting any fees from third-party storefronts, nor impose restrictions on app interfaces or block such external links outside of a neutral message informing the user they are accessing a third-party site. Rogers also referred the case to the federal attorney's office for possible criminal contempt proceedings, finding that company executives had lied and knowingly took an anti-competitive route to try to demonstrate compliance. Sweeney stated that with the ruling, they plan to bring Fortnite to iOS in the United States within a week, as well as offering to have Apple consider dropping all attempts to block third-party apps worldwide in exchange. Apple said they will comply with the new restrictions but appealed the decision to the Ninth Circuit.

Epic submitted Fortnite to the App Store on May 9, 2025. After a week with no response from Apple, Epic pulled and then resubmitted their application just ahead of a major update that they had planned for Fortnite. By May 16, 2025, Apple had still yet to approve the app, forcing Epic to forgo the patch for iOS devices and disable the app for iOS, affecting those in the European Union. Apple wrote to Epic that it would not approve Fortnite until after the Ninth Circuit rules on their motion for a preliminary injunction on their appeal. In response, Epic filed a motion in the district court to force Apple to approve Fortnite. After the court requested Apple to respond on May 19, Apple approved Fortnite, stating that all the issues with its submission to the App Store had been resolved; Epic brought the app back on May 20 for the U.S. and updated the European version.

The Ninth Circuit denied Apple's request for an emergency stay of Rogers' order related to the 27% revenue share on June 4, 2025. The case returned to the federal district court to determine the proper amount that Apple could take for a revenue share, during which Apple was not able to charge for any external storefront purchases. Several motions and appeals delayed the start of this phase, but ultimately ending with the Ninth Circuit again siding with Epic Games to allow the revenue share evaluation to continue at the district court. In May 2026, Apple had requested a stay of this decision to the Supreme Court, but the Supreme Court denied the request. However, the Court granted certiorari to Apple's appeal for hearing in its 2026 term, limited to the question on the contempt charges brought by Rogers.

Apple had requested the lower court to order Epic Games to pay 90% of Apple's legal fees estimated at $73 million, based on the fact that nine of the ten claims Epic filed were dismissed by the court.

== Aftermath ==
Apple announced in January 2024 that to comply with the European Union's Digital Markets Act (DMA) it will allow third party storefronts to be loaded onto iOS devices in March 2024. In response, Epic stated they plan to bring the Epic Games Store as well as Fortnite to iOS in Europe. Sweeney still argued that the new terms for use in the EU were "a new instance of Malicious Compliance" and would continue to challenge those through legal routes. While Epic had originally been approved for an Apple developer account through its Sweden office in preparation to release Fortnite on iOS in early 2024, Apple nullified the account on March 6, 2024, stating that Epic Games was untrustworthy and threatened the iOS environment. Epic published letters it had obtained from Apple that Epic claimed demonstrated the account termination was retaliatory for Sweeney's comments on Apple's compliance with the DMA and vowed to fight Apple as needed. The EU stated the next day they were seeking more details from Apple and whether the action was compliant under the DMA. Following that, on March 8, Apple reversed the ban on Epic's Sweden account, which Sweeney stated was "a big win for European rule of law, for the European Commission, and for the freedom of developers worldwide to speak up." Apple ultimately approved of Epic's application to be on the App Store in July 2024, following Apple's complaints that Epic's apps used user interface aspects that were too similar to its own storefront elements. The Epic Games Store app, along with Fortnite, were released for iOS users in Europe only on August 16, 2024.

The United Kingdom passed the Digital Markets, Competition and Consumers Bill (DMCC) in May 2024, which made similar requirements on app stores as the EU's DMA. After its passage, Epic Games stated they plan to bring their own Epic Games Store and Fortnite to iOS systems in the UK in the second half of 2025.

== Reactions ==
Companies like Facebook, Spotify, and the Match Group supported Epic Games in its lawsuit and spoke of their own past issues with Apple's App Store policies related to their services. Digital Content Next, a non-profit trade group representing media outlets like The New York Times and The Wall Street Journal, also backed Epic's suit, asserting among other issues that Apple has given out uniquely favorable deals to some providers like Amazon but not to others.

After the initial ban, some people attempted to sell mobile iOS devices with Fortnite still installed for thousands of dollars. When the game was removed from the App Store, it did not surprise many users as most people were anticipating it from the beginning and it seemed that many players purely jumped "on board for the memes", according to Polygon. In September 2020, Epic Games, together with thirteen other companies, launched the Coalition for App Fairness, which aims for better conditions for the inclusion of apps in the app stores.

On October 8, 2020, Microsoft announced a commitment to ten fairness principles in the operation of its Microsoft Store on Windows 10, which included promises of transparency over its guidelines, not blocking competing app stores from being used on Windows, and not removing apps from the store based on their business model, how they handle payments, or how their services are delivered.

In December 2020, Apple announced that it would be lowering the revenue cut Apple takes for app developers making $1M or less from 30% to 15% if app developers fill out an application for the lowered revenue cut.

== Related actions ==
=== By Epic Games ===
In December 2020, Epic Games filed separate complaints against Apple and Google in the United Kingdom's Competition Appeal Tribunal related to the companies' anticompetitive behavior in both the UK and European Union, with similar charges as Epic asserted in their U.S. cases. They have also launched legal action in Australia, and the European Union. On February 22, 2021, the Competition Appeal Tribunal rejected Epic's lawsuit against Apple in the UK however allowed their lawsuit against Google to proceed. Epic Games later released a statement stating that they would reconsider pursuing their lawsuit against Apple in the UK following the resolution of the U.S. lawsuit while also stated that they were "pleased" with the tribunal's decision regarding their case against Google.

Epic also filed similar charges against Apple in Australia. On April 9, 2021, Judge Nye Perram ordered a three-month stay on Epic's lawsuit against Apple in Australia while stating that the stay would become permanent in the event Epic does not file in the U.S. but under the Australian Consumer Law within that time frame. Epic appealed Judge Perram's ruling, which was granted in a ruling in July 2021, allowing its case in Australia to go forward. Epic's suit against Apple was combined with a similar suit it raised against Google and two class action suits brought by app developers as to reduce duplication of evidence and testimony across the cases, and in August 2025, justice Jonathan Beach found Apple and Google to be in violation of the Competition and Consumer Act 2010.

Epic had acquired Bandcamp in March 2022. Bandcamp allowed music creators to sell music with a 10–15% revenue split, which was kept following Epic's acquisition. Google announced a planned change in its Google Play Store policy that required all apps to use its Play Store payment systems or face removal by June 2022. Bandcamp, supported by Epic, sued Google in April 2022 and sought a preliminary injunction to block this action by Google, arguing that the 30% revenue cut demanded by the Play Store payment system would destroy their financial model. Google responded that they have offered a Media Experience Program that for media apps that provide appropriate integration with Google's services, that they can use a 10% revenue cut through the Play Store instead. By May 2022, an agreement had been arranged that while Epic's suit continues, Bandcamp could continue to use its in-app purchasing system, though they will retain the 10% fee on each sale in escrow until the conclusion of the case.

Additional filings by Epic assert that Google had paid competitors significant sums of money to dissuade them from making a competition app store to Google Play, with the highest being $360 million paid to Activision Blizzard. Epic Games said these payments helped Google to maintain its monopoly on storefronts via Google Play on the Android operating system.

=== Others ===
In the United States, forty states filed suit against Google in July 2021 arguing its app store practices, including its 30% revenue cut, were anti-competitive, similar to the factors that Epic sought in its case. Later, in August 2021, Senators Richard Blumenthal, Marsha Blackburn, and Amy Klobuchar introduced the Open App Markets Act bill, which would prevent app stores from forcing developers from exclusively using the app store's payment system. The bill passed out of the Senate committee by February 2022. It died at the end of the 117th Congress.

In August 2021, as part of a settlement to Cameron v. Apple, a similar class-action lawsuit filed by app developers, Apple announced that it would allow developers to collect information within apps such as email addresses from users so that the developers can subsequently tell customers about ways to pay outside of the App Store.

South Korea passed a law in August 2021 amending their Telecommunications Business Act that required app stores like Apple's and Google's to allow app developers to use alternative payment systems other than the storefront, in addition to giving the government more involvement in mediations over app store issues in conflicts between the operators and developers and users. This was the first such law passed at a national level. Epic asked Apple to allow Fortnite onto the Korean version of the store due to this policy in September 2021, but Apple rejected this as the law had yet to come into effect.
