= Musk v. Altman =

2026 U.S. lawsuit

- Court: Northern District of California
- Started: August 5, 2024; 2 years ago
- Docket nos.: 4:24-cv-04722

Case history
- Prior action: Lawsuit in San Francisco Superior Court (filed February 2024)
- Argument: cand.uscourts.gov/news/2026/05/01/musk-v-altman-trial-listen-live

Court membership
- Judge sitting: Yvonne Gonzalez Rogers

Keywords
- AI safety

Area of law
- Contract

Musk v. Altman was a February 2024 lawsuit in the United States District Court for the Northern District of California in which Elon Musk accused OpenAI and its executives, including CEO Sam Altman, of violating the company's founding agreement by prioritizing profits over AI safety.

On May 18, 2026, the jury decided in favor of OpenAI and its executives, finding that Musk's claims were barred by the statute of limitations.

== Background ==
Musk and Altman are two of the eleven co-founders of OpenAI, which was founded in 2015.

In early 2018, Musk proposed taking direct control of OpenAI, either through a majority stake in a for-profit subsidiary or by folding the organization into Tesla. The other co-founders, including Sam Altman, Greg Brockman, and Ilya Sutskever, rejected the proposal. Musk left the OpenAI board in February 2018, publicly citing a potential conflict of interest with Tesla's growing artificial intelligence work, although later reporting indicated the underlying dispute concerned control of the organization.

== Timeline ==
=== Leadup (2024–2026) ===
The lawsuit was originally filed on February 29, 2024.

In November 2024, Musk filed a motion for preliminary injunction to block OpenAI from changing from a nonprofit to a for-profit. He believes the conversion violates the terms of his contributions, which total $44 million, to OpenAI from 2016 to 2020. In February 2025, United States District Judge Yvonne Gonzalez Rogers said that Musk's claim of irreparable harm was a stretch.

In April 2025, twelve former employees of OpenAI stated in an amicus brief that OpenAI had abandoned its nonprofit roots and that Altman "was a person of low integrity who had directly lied to employees about the extent of his knowledge and involvement in OpenAI’s practices of forcing departing employees to sign lifetime non-disparagement agreements." The motion was filed by Harvard law professor Lawrence Lessig.

In April 2025, OpenAI countersued Musk, claiming that his actions were deliberate tactics to slow OpenAI in order to benefit his own interests. That month, the California attorney general declined to join Musk's lawsuit.

On May 1, 2025, Judge Yvonne Gonzalez Rogers trimmed the lawsuit, excluding claims of false advertising and breach of fiduciary duty, but allowed claims of fraud and unjust enrichment to proceed.

On May 5, 2025, OpenAI announced that it was no longer planning to restructure into a for-profit company separate from its nonprofit board. Later that day, Musk's lawyer Marc Toberoff, announced that the lawsuit against OpenAI would continue. In October 2025, OpenAI formed a for-profit company – OpenAI Group PBC – with the original non-profit receiving 26 percent ownership in the new entity and Microsoft receiving a 27 percent stake.

As part of the case files disclosed by Musk's lawyers in federal court in November 2025, Altman was shown to have reached out to Shivon Zilis on February 9, 2023, asking her advice about whether to publicly praise Musk on X, which he later did.

In April 2026, Musk amended the lawsuit asking that any monetary damages he might be awarded be given to OpenAI's charity and that Altman be removed from OpenAI's board.

In addition to Altman, various other OpenAI executives, including OpenAI president Greg Brockman, were sued by Musk in the lawsuit as well.

=== Trial ===
Jury selection for the case began on April 27, 2026.

On April 28, 2026, Elon Musk began his testimony against Altman and OpenAI, lasting until April 30; he was also questioned by both OpenAI's attorney William Savitt and by Musk's own lawyer Steven Molo. The next witness on Musk's side, after Musk himself finished testifying, was Jared Birchall. Molo also asked Rogers what another key witness, Stuart J. Russell, can discuss on the stand; Rogers replied that existential risk is outside the scope of the trial.

Shivon Zilis was another witness on the stand. Zilis, a former member of OpenAI's board, had children with Musk. This fact was confidential before it was made public by Business Insider in 2022.

Cross-examined on April 30, Musk was asked whether xAI had used distillation on OpenAI's models to train Grok. He called it a general practice among AI companies and, pressed on whether that meant yes, answered "Partly", adding that using other companies' models to validate one's own was standard.

On May 11, Microsoft CEO Satya Nadella testified that Musk never expressed concern to him that Microsoft's investments in OpenAI violated any terms or commitments.

On the last day of testimony, Molo called Savitt's focus "ironic" as they argued on the accuracy of each side's statements. Gonzalez Rogers intervened, saying that "This entire trial is a giant irony."

On May 18, 2026, the jury decided in favor of Altman and OpenAI, finding that Musk's claims were barred by the statute of limitations.

== See also ==
- Raine v. OpenAI
- Removal of Sam Altman from OpenAI
- Legal affairs of Elon Musk
