= Berry v. United States =

- Supreme Court of the United States
- Full case name: Corey Duran Berry, Petitioner v. United States
- Docket no.: 25-7026

Case history
- Prior: Judgment of conviction entered. United States v. Berry, No. 13-cr-20857 (S.D. Fla. 2014).; Motion to dismiss appeal with prejudice granted. United States v. Berry, No. 14-12116 (11th Cir. 2015).; First motion to vacate denied. Berry v. United States, No. 16-cv-22411 (S.D. Fla. 2017).; Certificate of appealability denied as to first motion to vacate. Berry v. United States, No. 17-12473 (11th Cir. 2017).; Cert. denied. Berry v. United States, 585 U.S. 1009 (2018).; Authorization to file second motion to vacate granted. In re Berry, No. 23-13310 (11th Cir. 2023).; Second motion to vacate denied. Berry v. United States, No. 23-cv-24416 (S.D. Fla. 2025).; Certificate of appealability denied as to second motion to vacate. Berry v. United States, No. 24-11704 (11th Cir. 2026).; Cert. granted. 610 U.S. ___ (2026).

Questions presented
- Whether a certificate of appealability under 28 U.S.C. § 2253 should be granted where the issue that the petitioner seeks to raise on appeal has been resolved against him by binding circuit precedent but has been resolved in his favor by another circuit.

Berry v. United States, No. 25-7026, is a pending United States Supreme Court case regarding federal habeas corpus practice.

== Legal background ==
=== Federal firearms law ===
Federal law prohibits, as a standalone offense, the use and carrying of a firearm during and in relation to a "crime of violence" or "drug trafficking crime," and that:

For purposes of this subsection the term “crime of violence” means an offense that is a felony and—

(A) has as an element the use, attempted use, or threatened use of physical force against the person or property of another, or
(B) that by its nature, involves a substantial risk that physical force against the person or property of another may be used in the course of committing the offense.

Section 924(c)(3)(A), which defines "crime of violence" in relation to the elements of the predicate offense, is called the "elements clause," while § 924(c)(3)(B) has been labeled the "residual clause".

=== Habeas corpus ===
Prisoners do not enjoy an absolute right to appeal a federal district court's denial of their habeas corpus petition. Federal law requires that such prisoners first obtain a "certificate of appealability" (COA). The Antiterrorism and Effective Death Penalty Act of 1996 (AEDPA) provides that:

Unless a circuit justice or judge issues a certificate of appealability, an appeal may not be taken to the court of appeals from ... the final order in a habeas corpus proceeding in which the detention complained of arises out of process issued by a State court ... or ... the final order in a proceeding under [the section governing similar such orders arising from a federal prosecution].

The COA is a necessary element of the appeals court's authority to hear the prisoner's appeal, without which it may not proceed to review the denial of the habeas corpus petition. AEDPA further provides that the COA may be issued "only if the applicant has made a substantial showing of the denial of a constitutional right.”

== Lower court history ==
In 2013, Corey Duran Berry was charged in the United States District Court for the Southern District of Florida in a four-count indictment. Count One charged Berry with attempted carjacking, and Count Two charged him with brandishing a firearm during the attempted carjacking charged in Count One. Count Three charged Berry with a completed carjacking, and Count Four charged him with brandishing a firearm during the completed carjacking charged in Count Three. Berry pleaded guilty to Counts One through Three, in exchange for the government agreeing to dismiss Count Four. On April 30, 2014, the district court sentenced Berry to a total of 218 months in prison. On Counts One and Three (attempted and completed carjacking), Berry was sentenced to 134 months each, to run concurrently with each other. On Count Two (brandishing a firearm during the attempted carjacking), Berry was sentenced to 84 months, to run consecutively to the 134 months he received on Counts One and Three. Berry noticed an appeal in the United States Court of Appeals for the Eleventh Circuit, but later dismissed the appeal with prejudice on January 21, 2015.

In 2016, Berry moved to vacate his firearm conviction. Berry argued that his conviction was invalid in light of Johnson v. United States, where the Supreme Court invalidated the Armed Career Criminal Act's residual clause on vagueness grounds. On February 28, 2017, the district court denied Berry's motion to vacate his sentence. It reasoned that, even if Johnson invalidated § 924(c)(3)(B), Berry's firearm conviction could still be sustained under § 924(c)(3)(A), the law's "elements clause." On November 27, 2017, the Eleventh Circuit denied a certificate of appealability. On February 16, 2018, Berry petitioned the Supreme Court for a writ of certiorari, asking the court to decide whether the federal carjacking statute is a crime of violence under § 924(c)'s elements clause. On June 18, 2018, the Supreme Court denied review.

In United States v. Davis (2019), the Supreme Court held that 18 U.S.C. § 924(c)(3)(B) (the residual clause) was unconstitutionally vague. Berry did not seek to file a second motion to vacate his firearm conviction at that time because Davis did not disturb the conclusion that attempted carjacking was a “crime of violence” under § 924(c)’s elements clause.

In United States v. Taylor, the Supreme Court held that attempted Hobbs Act robbery is not a "crime of violence" under § 924(c)'s elements clause. Berry then sought leave from the Eleventh Circuit to file a second motion to vacate his firearm conviction in light of Taylor, which the Court of Appeals granted on October 31, 2023. On April 17, 2025, the district court denied Berry's motion on the ground that he had not demonstrated by a preponderance of the evidence that the sentencing court had relied solely on the residual clause, rather than the elements clause, in finding that his attempted carjacking conviction was a "crime of violence" under § 924(c).

Berry again sought a certificate of appealability from the Eleventh Circuit. In his COA motion, Berry identified a circuit split regarding the question of what burden of proof applies in Johnson and Davis cases. The First, Fifth, Sixth, Eighth, Tenth, Eleventh, and District of Columbia Circuits required COA movants to demonstrate, by a preponderance of the evidence, that the sentencing court relied solely on the residual clause. The Third, Fourth, and Ninth Circuits required COA movants to merely demonstrate that the sentencing court may have relied on the residual clause. In light of this circuit split, Berry argued that he met AEDPA's standard for granting a COA by demonstrating that "reasonable jurists could debate" the correct burden of proof for issuing a COA in Johnson and Davis cases. Berry's procedural argument was, however, itself foreclosed by Eleventh Circuit precedent holding that a COA may not issue where a claim is foreclosed by binding circuit precedent, even if other circuits disagreed with Eleventh Circuit precedent. On February 18, 2026, Circuit Judge Nancy Abudu denied Berry's second motion for a COA.

In addition to the circuit split regarding the question of what burden of proof applies in Johnson and Davis cases, the Courts of Appeals are also split 3-2 on the question of whether a certificate of appealability should be granted where the issue on appeal is foreclosed by precedent in the prisoner’s home circuit but has been favorably resolved by another circuit. The Fifth, Sixth, and Eleventh Circuits have held that a COA may not be granted if there is adverse circuit precedent, notwithstanding a circuit conflict. Conversely, the Ninth and Tenth Circuits have held that a COA must be granted if there is a circuit conflict, notwithstanding adverse circuit precedent.

== Supreme Court ==
On March 10, 2026, Berry petitioned the Supreme Court for a writ of certiorari. On October 13, the Court granted review. The case will be argued during the Court's October 2026 term, with a decision expected by mid-2027.
