= Legal affairs of Elon Musk =

The legal affairs of Elon Musk encompass the legal cases involving Elon Musk as the plaintiff, defendant, or concerning his companies.

== SEC and shareholder lawsuits regarding tweets ==
In 2018, Musk was sued by the SEC for a tweet stating that funding had been secured for potentially taking Tesla private. (Note: Musk stated he was considering taking Tesla private at a price of $420 a share, an alleged reference to marijuana. Members of Tesla's board and rapper Azealia Banks alleged that Musk may have been under the influence of recreational drugs when he wrote the tweet.) The lawsuit characterized the tweet as false, misleading, and damaging to investors, and sought to bar Musk from working as CEO of publicly traded companies. Two days later, Musk settled with the SEC, without admitting or denying the SEC's allegations. As a result, Musk and Tesla were fined $20 million each, and Musk was forced to step down for three years as Tesla chairman but was able to remain as CEO. Shareholders filed a lawsuit over the tweet, and in February 2023, a jury found Musk and Tesla not liable. Musk has stated in interviews that he does not regret posting the tweet that triggered the SEC investigation.

In 2019, Musk stated in a tweet that Tesla would build half a million cars that year. The SEC reacted by asking a court to hold him in contempt for violating the terms of the 2018 settlement agreement. A joint agreement between Musk and the SEC eventually clarified the previous agreement details, including a list of topics about which Musk needed preclearance. In 2020, a judge blocked a lawsuit that claimed a tweet by Musk regarding Tesla stock price ("too high imo") violated the agreement. Freedom of Information Act (FOIA)-released records showed that the SEC concluded Musk had subsequently violated the agreement twice by tweeting regarding "Tesla's solar roof production volumes and its stock price".

== Tham Luang cave rescue and defamation case ==
In July 2018, Musk arranged for his employees to build a mini-submarine to assist the rescue of children trapped in a flooded cavern in Thailand. Richard Stanton, leader of the international rescue diving team, encouraged Musk to facilitate the construction of the vehicle as a backup in case flooding worsened. However, in a 2019 statement, Stanton concluded that the mini-submarine would not work and said that Musk's involvement "distracted from the rescue effort". Engineers at SpaceX and the Boring Company built the mini-submarine from a Falcon 9 liquid oxygen transfer tube in eight hours and personally delivered it to Thailand. Thai authorities ultimately declined to use the submarine, stating that it was not practical for the rescue mission. In March 2019, Musk was one of the 187 people who received various honors conferred by the King of Thailand for involvement in the rescue effort.

Elon Musk
(@elonmusk)
tweeted:

Replying to @zeynep

You know what, don't bother showing the video. We will make one of the mini-sub/pod going all the way to Cave 5 no problemo. Sorry pedo guy, you really did ask for it.

15 July 2018

Soon after the rescue, Vernon Unsworth, a British recreational caver who had been exploring the cave for the previous six years and played a key advisory role in the operation, criticized the submarine on CNN as amounting to nothing more than a public relations effort with no chance of success, maintaining that Musk "had no conception of what the cave passage was like" and "can stick his submarine where it hurts". Musk asserted on Twitter that the device would have worked and referred to Unsworth as a "pedo guy". He then deleted the tweets, apologized, and deleted his responses to critical tweets from Cher Scarlett, a software engineer, which had caused his followers to harass her. In an email to BuzzFeed News, Musk later called Unsworth a "child rapist" and said that he had married a child.

In September 2018, Unsworth filed a defamation suit; at trial he sought $190 million in damages. In his defense, Musk argued that "'pedo guy' was a common insult used in South Africa when I was growing up ... synonymous with 'creepy old man' and is used to insult a person's appearance and demeanor." During the trial Musk apologized to Unsworth again for the tweet. In December 2019, the jury ruled that Musk was not liable.

== Legal matters after 2020 ==
On May 20, 2022, Business Insider cited an anonymous friend of an unnamed SpaceX contract flight attendant, alleging that Musk engaged in sexual misconduct in 2016. The source stated that in November 2018, Musk, SpaceX, and the former flight attendant entered into a severance agreement granting the attendant a $250,000 payment in exchange for a promise not to sue over the claims. Musk responded, "If I were inclined to engage in sexual harassment, this is unlikely to be the first time in my entire 30-year career that it comes to light." He accused the article from Business Insider of being a "politically motivated hit piece". After the release of the article, Tesla's stock fell by more than 6%, and Barron's wrote of the fall that "some investors considered key-man risk – the danger that a company could be badly hurt by the loss of one individual."

In April 2023, the government of the U.S. Virgin Islands sought to subpoena Musk for documents in a lawsuit alleging that JPMorgan Chase profited from Jeffrey Epstein's sex trafficking operation. The efforts to subpoena Musk for documents do not implicate him in any wrongdoing and do not seek to have Musk testify under oath.

Musk's former girlfriend Grimes filed a parental relationship petition in late September 2023 as part of a custody dispute. The petition came a month after Grimes openly accused him in a social media post of blocking her access to the youngest of their three children. On July 27, 2024, Grimes' mother accused Musk of withholding the passports of her grandchildren.

Ben Brody, a 22-year-old Los Angeles-based college graduate, initiated a defamation lawsuit in October 2023 against Musk for over $1 million. He alleged Musk had falsely identified him as a participant "in a violent street brawl on behalf of a neo-Nazi extremist group" near Portland, Oregon. According to Brody's complaint, one of Musk's X posts promoted conspiracy theories that "Ben Brody's alleged participation in the extremist brawl meant the incident was probably a 'false flag' operation to deceive the American public". The complaint also alleged that Musk's accusations led to Brody and his family being subjected to harassment and threats. In February 2024, Musk was ordered to testify in a deposition for the lawsuit. In the deposition, Musk denied knowing who was suing him and admitted to doing no research on whether his claims were true. Musk attempted to keep the deposition from being made public.

In October 2023, the U.S. Securities and Exchange Commission (SEC) sued Musk over his refusal to testify a third time in an investigation into whether he violated federal law by purchasing Twitter stock in 2022. Musk claimed the SEC was harassing him. In February 2024, Judge Laurel Beeler ruled that Musk must testify again. In January 2025, the SEC filed a lawsuit against Musk for securities violations related to his purchase of Twitter.

In January 2024, Delaware Judge Kathaleen McCormick ruled in a 2018 lawsuit that Musk's $55 billion pay package from Tesla be rescinded. McCormick called the compensation granted by the company's board "an unfathomable sum" that was unfair to shareholders. In response to the ruling, Musk posted on X: "Never incorporate your company in the state of Delaware." A re-ratification shareholders' vote passed in mid-June 2024. The Delaware Supreme Court overturned the decision in December 2025, restoring Musk's compensation package and awarding $1 in nominal damages.

In February 2024 Musk sued OpenAI and its executives, including Sam Altman and president Greg Brockman, over the company violating its founding agreement by prioritizing profits over AI safety. On May 18, 2026, a jury decided in favor of OpenAI and its executives, finding that Musk's claims were barred by the statute of limitations.

In June 2024, The Wall Street Journal reported Musk had a "romantic relationship" with a former intern at SpaceX, confirmed with affidavits supplied by the intern's lawyers who also represent Musk, and alleged that he had sexual relations with a woman who directly reported to him there. The article further alleges he also pursued sex with other SpaceX employees, and repeatedly asked an employee who reported directly to him to "have his babies". In the same month, eight ex-employees, the same eight who were previously fired for penning an anti-Musk letter at SpaceX, filed a lawsuit against Musk alleging sexual harassment.

Also in June 2024, a former Twitter executive sued Musk for "cheating" him and other ousted executives out of $200 million in severance pay.

In August 2024, X (formerly Twitter) sued advertisers, including Unilever, Mars and CVS, alleging an illegal boycott. Later that month, Olympic boxer Imane Khelif filed a criminal complaint with the French police about cyber harassment against X over alleged "acts of aggravated cyber harassment", in which Musk was named.

In October 2024, Musk and his America PAC were sued in Pennsylvania for allegedly operating an unlawful lottery before the 2024 US presidential election. In November 2024, he was sued again regarding the lottery. In August 2025, U.S. District Judge Robert Pitman allowed one of the lottery lawsuits to proceed.

In February 2025, Ashley St. Clair filed suit against Musk alleging him to be the father of her child born in September 2024. St. Clair sought a paternity test, sole custody and child support. He was later confirmed to be the father.

In March 2026, a jury in San Francisco, California ruled that Musk misled Twitter investors before his $44 billion purchase. The verdict could result in shareholders being awarded from $3 to $8 a day for damages, which plaintiffs' lawyers said may total $2.1 billion. The ruling cleared Musk of a more serious "scheming to defraud" charge.
