= Johnson v. United States Congress =

- Supreme Court of the United States
- Full case name: Floyd D. Johnson, a.k.a. Donald F. Johnson v. United States Congress
- Docket no.: 25-735

Case history
- Prior: United States Court of Appeals for the Eleventh Circuit, No. 23-10682 (August 19, 2025); United States District Court for the Middle District of Florida, No. 6:22-cv-504-WWWB-DAB (November 14, 2022)

Questions presented
- Did the Veterans' Judicial Review Act strip district courts of the jurisdiction, recognized by this Court in Johnson v. Robison, 415 U.S. 361 (1974), to hear challenges to the constitutionality of acts of Congress affecting veterans' benefits?

Johnson v. United States Congress (Docket No. 25-735) is a pending case at the United States Supreme Court. The case concerns whether the Veterans’ Judicial Review Act strips federal district courts of jurisdiction to hear certain constitutional challenges to that law. A decision in favor of the petitioner "could give veterans a new path to challenge the legality of benefits laws, separate from the VA’s administrative appeals system."

The Supreme Court granted a writ of certiorari on April 6, 2026 and held oral argument on October 5, 2026.

== Background and Lower Court Proceedings ==
According to the opinion from the United States Court of Appeals for the Eleventh Circuit, Floyd Johnson, "a United States Army veteran, was convicted of several state felonies and sentenced to 40 years of imprisonment in a Florida prison" when he applied for disability benefits. His claim was initially approved by the Veterans Benefits Administration, but later reduced to 10% under a federal law that limits benefits to veterans who have been incarcerated for felony convictions.

Johnson filed a pro se lawsuit in federal district court in Florida, alleging that the reduction of his benefits violated the Constitution in various ways. A magistrate judge recommended dismissal of Johnson's case because (assuming the court had jurisdiction) his claims were "frivolous" and presented no "arguable basis in law."

Johnson appealed his case, but the court of appeals vacated the district court's decision and remanded the case with instructions to dismiss Johnson's case. The court of appeals reasoned that it was error for the district court to merely assume jurisdiction. Rather, assuming a "hypothetical jurisdiction" was “beyond the bounds of authorized judicial action.” The court lacked subject-matter jurisdiction both because of sovereign immunity and because the Veterans’ Judicial Review Act gave "exclusive jurisdiction" to hear cases like Johnson's to the Court of Appeals for Veterans Claims and to the Federal Circuit.

Contrary to the court's reasoning, Johnson argued that the holding of Johnson v. Robison, 415 U.S. 361 (1974), "did not preclude the district courts from entertaining facial constitutional challenges to acts of Congress affecting benefits." The court of appeals rejected that argument, holding that the earlier case "involved a materially different statutory scheme that has since been amended." In Robison, the Supreme Court "applied the canon of constitutional avoidance," ruling only that "district courts retained jurisdiction to hear facial constitutional challenges to veterans’ benefits statutes because 'no explicit provision of [the law at issue barred] judicial consideration of appellee’s constitutional claims.'"

== Supreme Court ==
On April 6, 2026, the Supreme Court agreed to hear the case. The question presented is:

Did the Veterans' Judicial Review Act strip district courts of the jurisdiction, recognized by this Court in Johnson v. Robison, 415 U.S. 361 (1974), to hear challenges to the constitutionality of acts of Congress affecting veterans' benefits?

Oral argument was held on October 5, 2026.
