= Jouppi v. Alaska =

- Supreme Court of the United States
- Full case name: Kenneth J. Jouppi v. Alaska
- Docket no.: 25-246

Questions presented
- Whether, in determining whether a fine contravenes the Excessive Fines Clause, courts may consider the gravity of the underlying offense purely in the abstract or should consider the gravity of the specific defendant's wrongdoing.

Jouppi v. Alaska is a pending United States Supreme Court case involving the Excessive Fines Clause of the Eighth Amendment to the United States Constitution, whether excessive fines should be judged on the maximum possible penalty of the crime or relative to the specific penalties enacted.

== Background ==
In Timbs v. Indiana (2019), the Supreme Court unanimously affirmed that the Excessive Fines Clause of the Eighth Amendment to the United States Constitution is incorporated against states. That specific case dealt with the state of Indiana using forfeiture laws to seize a $42,000 vehicle for the possession of less than $500 of illegal drugs, for which the accused had already paid fines and served one year of house arrest and five years of prohibition. Following the Supreme Court's ruling, the Indiana Supreme Court ruled that the seizure was unconstitutional.

In Jouppi, Kenneth Jouppi was an 85-year-old (as of 2025) veteran bush pilot (since retired) to help transport residents from their remote cities to major ones in Alaska and back. In 2012, he was preparing to carry a passenger from Fairbanks to Beaver, one of dozens of small towns where alcohol was banned as allowed under state law. Jouppi was not aware the passenger had packed cases of beer in their belongings, and just before takeoff, Jouppi's plane was searched by Alaska State Troopers who discovered the beer. Both Jouppi and the passenger were charged with a misdemeanor for bootlegging. While the passenger admitted guilt and paid a fine, Jouppi claimed he was innocent, as he was not aware the passenger was transporting beer, only having seeing the tops of beverage cans but not their labels. This led to a jury trial, where he was found guilty, with the judge penalizing Jouppi with a reduced sentence of three days in jail and a reduced fine of $1500 by 2013.

Jouppi's Cessna 206, valued at $95,000, was seized by the troopers since discovery, and the state argued that the plane should be forfeited, claiming that Jouppi was aware of the beer being transported and would be using the plane to commit a crime. While the request was denied at the trial court, the state appealed, and in 2017, the Alaska Court of Appeals remanded the case back to the lower court to re-evaluate the forfeiture request under new terms. The trial judge still denied the forfeiture request, and on the state's appeal in 2022, the Court of Appeals partially ruled in the state's favor allowing the plane to be forfeit in 2022. Jouppi appealed to the Alaska Supreme Court, where by April 2025, the court ruled unanimously to allow the plane to be seized. The court, in evaluating whether the seizure was excessive, worked under the framework of United States v. Bajakajian (1998) and argued that they should judge the value of the plane against the maximum possible fine that could be imposed under state law, $10,000, rather than the actual $1,500 fine he was given; the court found that the 9.5:1 ratio was not excessive for forfeiture.

== Supreme Court ==
With support from the Institute for Justice, Jouppi submitted his petition for writ of certiorari to the United States Supreme Court in September 2025. Jouppi specifically asked the court to review whether, in the evaluation of excessive fines, if courts should consider the overall abstract nature of the offense, as the Alaska Supreme Court had done, or should only consider the specific circumstance. The Supreme Court granted certiorari on July 21, 2026, with the case expected to be heard during the 2026–2027 term.
