= Guerrero v. Johnson =

Guererro v. Johnson
- Supreme Court of the United States

Argued November 4, 2026
- Full case name: Eric Guerrero, Director, Texas Department of Criminal Justice, Correctional Institutions Division, Petitioner v. Dexter Johnson
- Docket no.: 25-1003
- Argument: Audio; Transcript

Case history
- Prior: Expand for full procedural history.: Conviction and death sentence affirmed. Johnson v. State, No. AP-75,749 (Tex. Crim. App. January 27, 2010).; Cert. denied. 561 U.S. 1031 (June 28, 2010).; First state habeas corpus application denied. Ex parte Johnson, No. WR-73,600-01 (Tex. Crim. App. June 30, 2010).; Federal habeas corpus petition partially denied. Johnson v. Stephens, No. 11-cv-2466 (S.D. Tex. August 19, 2013).; Motion for reconsideration denied. Johnson v. Stephens, No. 11-cv-2466 (S.D. Tex. October 10, 2013).; Federal habeas corpus petition fully denied. Johnson v. Stephens, No. 11-cv-2466 (S.D. Tex. June 24, 2014).; Affirmed. Johnson v. Stephens, 617 F. App'x 293 (5th Cir. July 2, 2015).; Cert. denied. Johnson v. Stephens, 577 U.S. 1121 (January 25, 2016).; Motion for reconsideration denied. Johnson v. Davis (S.D. Tex. November 6, 2017).; Certificate of appealability denied. Johnson v. Davis, No. 17-70032 (5th Cir. August 24, 2018).; Cert. denied. Johnson v. Davis, 586 U.S. 1249 (March 25, 2019).; Successive state habeas corpus application denied. Ex parte Johnson, No. WR-75,478-02 (Tex. Crim. App. April 29, 2019).; Successive state habeas corpus application denied. Ex parte Johnson, No. WR-73,600-03, (Tex. Crim. App. August 13, 2019).; Second federal habeas petition authorized. In re Johnson, 935 F.3d 284 (5th Cir. August 14, 2019).; Cert denied. Johnson v. Davis, 589 U.S. 1279 (March 23, 2020).; Motion to dismiss denied. Johnson v. Lumpkin, No. 19-cv-3047 (S.D. Tex. October 28, 2022).; Interlocutory appeal certified. Johnson v. Lumpkin, No. 19-cv-3047 (S.D. Tex. January 12, 2023).; Denial of motion to dismiss affirmed. Johnson v. Guerrero, No. 23-70002 (5th Cir. July 23, 2025).; Rehearing en banc denied. Johnson v. Guerrero, 164 F.4th 398 (5th Cir. January 12, 2026).; Cert. granted. 608 U.S. ___ (June 15, 2026).

Questions presented
- Whether a claim relies on a "a new rule of constitutional law, made retroactive to cases on collateral review by the Supreme Court, that was previously unavailable" when the habeas petitioner could have asserted a claim based on the rule in a prior federal habeas petition.

Court membership
- Chief Justice John Roberts Associate Justices Clarence Thomas · Samuel Alito; Sonia Sotomayor · Elena Kagan; Neil Gorsuch · Brett Kavanaugh; Amy Coney Barrett · Ketanji Brown Jackson

Guerrero v. Johnson, No. 25-1003, is a pending United States Supreme Court case. The Court has been asked to decide whether, under the Antiterrorism and Effective Death Penalty Act of 1996, a successive habeas petition may proceed when the governing constitutional rule was already established but only later became factually viable.

== Background ==
=== Legal background ===
The Antiterrorism and Effective Death Penalty Act of 1996 (AEDPA) substantially restricts the availability of federal habeas corpus relief for state and federal prisoners. For example, AEDPA imposes strict limitations on "second or successive" habeas petitions. Under 28 U.S.C. § 2244(b), a state prisoner generally may file only one federal petition for a writ of habeas corpus challenging a state conviction or sentence. Claims previously presented in an earlier petition must be dismissed, while new claims may proceed only if they satisfy one of two statutory exceptions.

The first exception permits a successive petition where the claim relies on "a new rule of constitutional law, made retroactive to cases on collateral review by the Supreme Court, that was previously unavailable." The second exception applies where the claim is based on previously undiscoverable evidence that, if proven, would establish by clear and convincing evidence that no reasonable factfinder would have found the applicant guilty of the underlying offense. Similar restrictions apply to successive motions filed by federal prisoners.

Before filing a second or successive habeas petition in federal district court, a state prisoner must obtain authorization from the appropriate United States court of appeals. The court of appeals may authorize the petition only upon a preliminary determination that the statutory requirements have been met. Even after authorization is granted, the district court must independently determine whether the petition satisfies AEDPA's gatekeeping requirements before reaching the merits of the underlying constitutional claim. Authorization decisions by the courts of appeals are generally not subject to rehearing or review by the Supreme Court

In 2002, the Supreme Court decided Atkins v. Virginia. Atkins held that the Eighth Amendment prohibits execution of the intellectually disabled.

=== Factual background ===
In the early morning hours of June 18, 2006, Dexter Johnson and four friends drove around looking for a person to rob. In the car were Johnson; Kiethron Fields, a close friend to Johnson; Timothy Randle, the driver of the car; Ashley Ervin, the owner of the car; and Louis Ervin, the fifteen-year-old brother of Ashley Ervin. The five eventually came upon Maria Aparece and her boyfriend Huy Ngo, talking inside Aparece's blue Toyota Matrix. Johnson ordered Randle to park near Aparece, and then exited his car with Fields. Johnson then rushed to the driver's side door of Aparece's car while brandishing a shotgun, and demanded that she open the door. Fields, also brandishing a firearm, stood near the passenger side window. After Aparece opened the door, Johnson pulled her out of her car by the hair and forced her into the car's rear seat. Fields shoved Ngo into the back seat of the car, and himself entered the rear seat of the car with the two victims. Johnson then drove the Matrix around for roughly ten minutes while demanding money from Aparece and Ngo, but grew angry when the victims could not produce any. Over Aparece's cries, Johnson drove for another roughly twenty minutes searching for a wooded area. They eventually found a park with a wooded area, where Johnson parked the Matrix. Randle and Ashley Ervin, who had been following closely in Ashley's car, parked close by.

Fields forced Ngo from the back of the car and onto his knees. Meanwhile, Johnson entered the backseat of the car and raped Aparece at gunpoint. Fields held a gun to Ngo’s head and taunted him as he was crying, saying things like “My brother in there having sex with your girlfriend. What you going to do about it?” Afterward, Johnson told the couple that “it was the end right here” and that he was going to “off them.” Although they both continued to cry and Aparece begged for her life, Johnson and Fields marched the couple into the woods and shot them both once in the head.

After the murders, Johnson and Fields (still driving Aparece's blue Toyota Matrix) caught up with their companions at a red light. Johnson noted that he "had to go ahead and off them people," before ordering the others to follow him to a gas station. At the gas station—where police obtained surveillance video of the Matrix—Louis Ervin asked Johnson why he killed the couple, to which Johnson replied that Johnson had said the name “Louis” to the victims during the robbery and that “they didn’t want to give him no money.” Johnson also stated that “killing people is what he do.” Later, Johnson took his friends on a shopping spree at two separate Walmart stores, where surveillance video showed him making purchases with Aparece's credit card. Johnson was arrested three days later for possession of marijuana and was quickly linked to the disappearance of Aparece and Ngo.

== Lower court history ==
=== 2006–2016 ===
Johnson was indicted for the capital murder of Maria Aparece. Prior to trial, Johnson moved to suppress the recorded statements he made to detectives on two separate occasions after his arrest. After evidentiary hearings, the trial judge allowed the state to admit Johnson's statements. In June 2007, Johnson was convicted of capital murder and sentenced to death. His conviction and sentence were affirmed on direct appeal by the Texas Court of Criminal Appeals (TCCA). The United States Supreme Court denied certiorari. While his direct appeal was pending, Johnson filed a petition for a writ of habeas corpus in Texas state court, which the TCCA subsequently denied. Johnson did not raise an Atkins claim in his first state habeas petition.

After exhausting his state remedies, Johnson filed a petition for a writ of habeas corpus in the United States District Court for the Southern District of Texas. In his first federal petition, Johnson raised eleven grounds for relief. Importantly, he did not raise an Atkins claim. Rather, he claimed that he was mentally ill and thus only borderline intellectually disabled, and urged that the principles underlying Atkins be extended to the mentally ill. The district court denied Johnson's petition, and the United States Court of Appeals for the Fifth Circuit affirmed on July 2, 2015. On January 25, 2016, the Supreme Court again denied certiorari.

=== 2017–2025 ===
In 2017, Johnson sought reconsideration of the district court's denial of federal habeas relief. The district court denied reconsideration, the Fifth Circuit denied a certificate of appealability, and the Supreme Court once more denied certiorari.

Johnson was first scheduled to be executed on May 2, 2019. Weeks before his scheduled execution, Johnson filed a second petition for a writ of habeas corpus in state court, asserting an Atkins claim. The TCCA dismissed the petition. Johnson was then scheduled to be executed on August 15, 2019. On August 8, Johnson moved in the Fifth Circuit for authorization to file a second federal habeas petition asserting an Atkins claim. Johnson based this claim on the American Psychiatric Association’s May 2013 publication of the fifth edition of the Diagnostic and Statistical Manual of Mental Disorders (DSM‑V), which substantially revised the diagnostic approach to intellectual disability, deemphasized IQ cutoffs, and placed greater emphasis on clinical judgment and documented adaptive‑functioning deficits. It suggested that individuals with IQ scores above 70 may still meet diagnostic criteria for intellectual disability. The TCCA had then recently adopted the DSM‑V as the governing standard for intellectual‑disability claims in state collateral proceedings. Relying on earlier precedent, a panel of the Fifth Circuit granted Johnson's application for leave to file a second federal habeas petition.

Back in the district court, Texas moved to dismiss Johnson's application for failure to comply with the requirements of 28 U.S.C. § 2244(b)(2). The district court denied Texas's motion, recognizing that the Fifth Circuit “has read a futility exception into section 2244(b)(2)(A)” and applied this “judicially created exception” to AEDPA. At the request of Texas, the district court certified its order denying the motion to dismiss Johnson's application for an interlocutory appeal under 28 U.S.C. § 1292(b). The Fifth Circuit accepted the interlocutory appeal, and the panel (the same Fifth Circuit panel that had previously authorized the successive petition) affirmed the denial of the motion to dismiss. Texas petitioned for rehearing en banc, which was denied by a vote of 9 to 7, with Judge James Ho filing a dissent and Judge Oldham not participating.

== Supreme Court ==
On February 19, 2026, Texas petitioned the Supreme Court for a writ of certiorari. On June 15, the Court granted review. Oral arguments were heard on November 4. The case was argued on behalf of Texas by William R. Peterson; on behalf of the United States as amicus curiae in support of Texas by Emily M. Ferguson; and on behalf of Johnson by Jeremy Schepers. A decision is expected by mid-2027.
