= International Partners for Ethical Care, Inc. v. Ferguson =

- Supreme Court of the United States
- Full case name: International Partners for Ethical Care, Inc., et al., Petitioners v. Bob Ferguson, Governor of Washington, et al.
- Docket no.: 25-840

Case history
- Prior: Motion to dismiss granted. International Partners for Ethical Care, Inc. v. Inslee, No. 23-cv-5736 (W.D. Wash. 2024).; Affirmed sub nom International Partners for Ethical Care, Inc. v. Ferguson, 146 F.4th 841 (9th Cir. 2025).; Reh'g en banc denied. 161 F.4th 604 (9th Cir. 2025).; Cert. granted. 609 U.S. ___ (2026).

Questions presented
- Whether parents have standing to challenge a law or policy that deliberately displaces their decision-making role as to "gender transitions" of their children, and in so doing creates present and likely future impediments to their ability to parent their children as they deem best for them.

International Partners for Ethical Care, Inc. v. Ferguson, No. 25-840, is a pending United States Supreme Court case relating to Article III standing.

== Background ==
=== Legal background ===
In 1985, the Washington State Legislature enacted Wash. Rev. Code § 71.34.530. The law provides that any minor aged 13 or older "may request and receive outpatient treatment without the consent of the adolescent's parent." Such outpatient treatment includes, among other things, non-residential mental and behavioral health programs. Parents whose children elect to receive treatment without parental consent may nevertheless access information about their children's care. Nevertheless,

"[w]hen an adolescent voluntarily consents to his or her own mental health treatment under . . . [§] 71.34.530, a mental health professional shall not proactively exercise his or her discretion . . . to release information or records related to solely mental health services received by the adolescent to a parent of the adolescent, beyond any notification required under [Washington law], unless the adolescent states a clear desire to do so[.]"

In 2023, the Washington State Legislature enacted Engrossed Substitute Senate Bill (ESSB) 5599, which amended parts of Wash. Rev. Code § 13.32A.082. Enacted in 1995, § 13.32A.082 establishes a framework of notification requirements applicable when a licensed youth shelter "shelters a child and knows at the time of providing the shelter that the child is away from a lawfully prescribed residence or home without parental permission." Upon admitting such a child, the shelter "must contact the youth's parent within 72 hours, but preferably within 24 hours." However, in the presence of "compelling reasons," including any "c]ircumstances that indicate that notifying the parent or legal guardian will subject the minor to abuse or neglect," the shelter may forego contacting the child's parents and contact the Washington Department of Children, Youth, and Families (DCYF) instead. Upon contact, DCYF must "make a good faith attempt to notify the parent that a report has been received and offer services to the youth and the family designed to resolve the conflict . . . and accomplish a reunification of the family." ESSB 5599 adds to this framework by creating a notification pathway that is specific to youth "seeking or receiving protected health care services," including "gender-affirming treatment" and "reproductive health care services." Under the existing framework set forth in Wash. Rev. Code § 13.32A.082, licensed shelters that took in such children were obligated to notify their parents so long as doing so would not "subject the minor to abuse or neglect." ESSB 5599 modifies this framework by providing that the fact of a child's "seeking or receiving protected health care services" creates an additional instance in which the shelter's obligation to notify the child's parents is voided. In these situations, as when the shelter fears potential abuse or neglect by the child's parents, the shelter may again forego contacting the child's parents and contact DCYF instead. As in a case involving potential abuse or neglect, a licensed shelter's report to DCYF will again trigger DCYF's good-faith obligation "to notify the parent that a report has been received and offer services to the youth and the family designed to resolve the conflict . . . and accomplish a reunification of the family." ESSB 5599 further specifies that, if a licensed shelter notifies DCYF that it has taken in a minor seeking or receiving "protected health care services," DCYF must specifically offer two types of services. First, DCYF must "[o]ffer to make referrals on behalf of the minor for appropriate behavioral health services." Second, DCYF must "[o]ffer services designed to resolve the conflict and accomplish a reunification of the family."

Alongside ESSB 5599, the Washington State Legislature also passed Substitute House Bill (SHB) 1406 in 2023. SHB 1406 implements two additional revisions to the framework set forth in Wash. Rev. Code § 13.32A.082. First, it creates additional rules concerning DCYF's good-faith obligation to notify a child's parents and offer services after receiving a report of a runaway child. Specifically, in addition to "notify[ing] the parent that a report has been received," DCYF must offer "family reconciliation services," which are "services . . . designed to assess and stabilize the family with the goal of resolving crisis and building supports, skills, and connection to community networks and resources." DCYF must offer these services "as soon as possible, but no later than three days, excluding weekends and holidays, following the receipt of a report." Second, SHB 1406 expressly recognizes a pathway for qualifying minors to stay in a licensed shelter for up to 90 days without parental permission. This pathway is only available in two situations: (1) if the shelter "is unable to make contact with a parent despite their notification efforts" to the parent or DCYF, or (2) if the shelter "makes contact with a parent, but the parent does not request that the child return home". In either scenario, the shelter must re-contact DCYF, which again must offer reconciliation services to the family.

=== Factual background ===
Plaintiffs are two national organizations and five sets of Washington parents (identified in court filings as 1A and 1B, 2A and 2B, 3A and 3B, 4A and 4B, and 5A and 5B) whose children (with the exception of the children of 4A and 4B) have exhibited signs of gender dysphoria:

Parents 1A and 1B have a 14-year-old child, 1C, who has shown signs of gender dysphoria. After 1C underwent a social transition at school, 1A and 1B sought treatment for 1C and removed 1C from school. These actions caused 1C's "gender confusion [to] ease[] some." Yet 1A and 1B remain "concerned" that 1C will again seek to "adopt a gender identi[t]y inconsistent with [1C's] biological sex." They "fear" that 1C may seek to take advantage of the framework set forth in the Statutes and worry that "[i]f 1C were to run away, the [Statutes] would greatly harm [their] ability to care for and raise" 1C. This concern has made 1A "hesitant to discipline 1C for fear it will cause a rift that others might take advantage of."

Parents 2A and 2B have two children—an 18-year-old, 2C, and a 13-year-old, 2D—who have shown signs of gender dysphoria. 2C, who has accused 2A and 2B of being "transphobic," has threatened to take 2D, who underwent a social transition at school, to a "safe place" where 2D's pronouns would be respected. This causes 2A and 2B to become fearful every time 2D leaves their home with 2C. To avoid exacerbating tensions with their children, 2A and 2B have begun to avoid talking about gender around 2C and 2D, and 2A has also ceased using 2D's name or pronouns in public settings. 2A and 2B worry that, "should [2D] run away to a shelter," their parental rights would be limited.

Parents 3A and 3B have a 14-year-old child, 3C, who is autistic and has shown signs of gender dysphoria. 3C has "experiment[ed] with a new name and . . . pronouns with friends and at school," and is "frequently ambivalent about . . . gender." When 3C's older brother experienced similar signs of gender confusion, "a friend's family encouraged [him] to run away and live with them." 3A and 3B fear that 3C may similarly be encouraged to run away and worry that, if 3C does, the Statutes will "force[] [them] to accept 'gender-affirming treatment' for" 3C.

Finally, Parents 5A and 5B have a 15-year-old child, 5C, who has shown signs of gender dysphoria. 5C's symptoms came on "rapid[ly]" at age 12, and 5C later underwent a social transition at school without 5A and 5B's knowledge. 5C continues to identify as "transgender" at school and has “had conversations with numerous therapists and behavioral health specialists about gender identity and 'transitioning.'" Because 5C ran away from home once at age 13, and because 5C has since had "hospitalizations" about which 5A and 5B have limited information, 5A and 5B worry that 5C will run away again and will rely on the Statutes to seek gender-affirming care.

== Lower court history ==
=== District court ===
In August 2023, plaintiffs filed suit in the United States District Court for the Western District of Washington against the Governor of Washington, Attorney General of Washington, and Secretary of DYCF. In their original suit, plaintiffs challenged ESSB 5599 on a facial basis. Plaintiffs later amended their complaint to include parents 5A and 5B, as well as challenges to SHB 1406 and Wash. Rev. Code § 71.34.530, asserting Due Process, Free Exercise, and Free Speech claims. The district court dismissed plaintiffs' suit with prejudice for lack of standing.

=== Court of appeals ===
On July 25, 2025, the United States Court of Appeals for the Ninth Circuit affirmed. In so doing, it held that neither the individual parent plaintiffs nor the organizational plaintiffs could demonstrate Article III standing.

First, the Court addressed plaintiffs' claims of injury based on the Washington statutes' impact on their methods of parenting. 1A and 1B had alleged they are now reluctant to discipline their child because they fear the child might run away and invoke the statutes. Quoting Clapper v. Amnesty International USA (2013), the Court held that a plaintiff "cannot manufacture standing merely by inflicting harm on themselves based on their fears of hypothetical future harm that is not certainly impending." Second, the Court addressed claims of speech censorship. Some parents alleged they avoid discussing gender or avoid using certain names or pronouns because they fear future consequences. It held that plaintiffs "cannot 'reasonably fear[] prosecution under [the Statutes] for engaging in protected speech' because the Statutes do not regulate or prosecute speech." Third, it addressed plaintiffs' claims of injury based on loss of access to information. It held that 1C's school-accommodated social transition undertaken without the knowledge of 1A and 1B was neither traceable to the challenged statutes, nor redressable by a declaration that those statutes are unconstitutional. It additionally held that the amended complaint did not sufficiently allege a connection between the challenged statutes and 5A and 5B's claimed injury regarding 5C's unexplained hospitalizations. Finally, the Court dismissed standing arguments predicated on plaintiffs' claimed future injuries, as well as holding that the organizational plaintiffs lacked standing to sue.

On December 5, 2025, the Ninth Circuit denied rehearing en banc. Dissenting from the denial of rehearing, Judge VanDyke (joined by Judge Bumatay) stated that Washington’s legal regime governing the treatment of gender dysphoria infringes on the plaintiff parents’ right to direct the care and upbringing of their children. Judge VanDyke also stated that plaintiffs plausibly allege an unconstitutional interference with their fundamental right to parent, and that the panel’s decision to the contrary narrows the parental right unjustly—creating a clean split with the United States Court of Appeals for the Fifth Circuit in the process. Also dissenting, Judge Tung (joined by Judge Bumatay and Judge VanDyke) stated that plaintiffs' pleaded facts should have been sufficient to establish standing. Judge Tung went on to state that, in concluding that the parents’ allegations were insufficient to state an injury-in-fact, the panel runs afoul of Supreme Court and Ninth Circuit jurisprudence governing standing, improperly construes the parents' complaint in the light most disfavorable to them, and is inconsistent with the holdings of other circuits.

== Supreme Court ==
On January 7, 2026, plaintiffs petitioned the Supreme Court for a writ of certiorari. On June 29, the Court granted review. The case will be heard during the Supreme Court's October 2026 Term, with a decision expected by mid-2027.
