= St. Mary Catholic Parish v. Roy =

- Supreme Court of the United States
- Full case name: St. Mary Catholic Parish v. Roy
- Docket no.: 25-581

Questions presented
- 1. Whether proving a lack of general applicability under Employment Division v. Smith requires showing unfettered discretion or categorical exemptions for identical secular conduct.; 2. Whether Carson v. Makin displaces the rule of Employment Division v. Smith only when the government explicitly excludes religious people and institutions.

St. Mary Catholic Parish v. Roy, No. 25-581, is a pending United States Supreme Court case regarding the First Amendment.

== Background ==
In 2020, Colorado voters approved Proposition EE to establish universal preschool which was codified by the Early Childhood Act. The act created the Colorado Department of Early Childhood. Under a "mixed delivery system", public and private providers are required to "provide eligible children an equal opportunity to enroll and receive preschool services regardless of race, ethnicity, religious affiliation, sexual orientation, gender identity, lack of housing, income level, or disability, as such characteristics and circumstances apply to the child or the child’s family".

== Proceedings ==
In August 2023, representing St. Mary Catholic Parish in Littleton, St. Bernadette Catholic Parish in Lakewood, two parents and the Archdiocese of Denver, the Becket (law firm) sued. The plaintiffs say they are excluded from the program because the program requires providers to "provide eligible children an equal opportunity" regardless of sexual orientation and gender identity and that this exclusion violates the First Amendment. Plaintiffs also argue that there are categorical secular exceptions to the nondiscrimination requirement based on disability and income level. Specifically, an Individualized Education Program and Head Start (program) preference.

In September 2025, the Court of Appeals for the Tenth Circuit affirmed a ruling by Senior Judge John L. Kane Jr. of the United States District Court for the District of Colorado which denied plaintiffs request to enjoin "the nondiscrimination requirement from being applied to them."

== See also ==
- List of landmark court decisions in the United States § Freedom of religion
- List of LGBTQ-related cases in the United States Supreme Court
