= Yvonne Gonzalez Rogers =

American federal judge (born 1965)

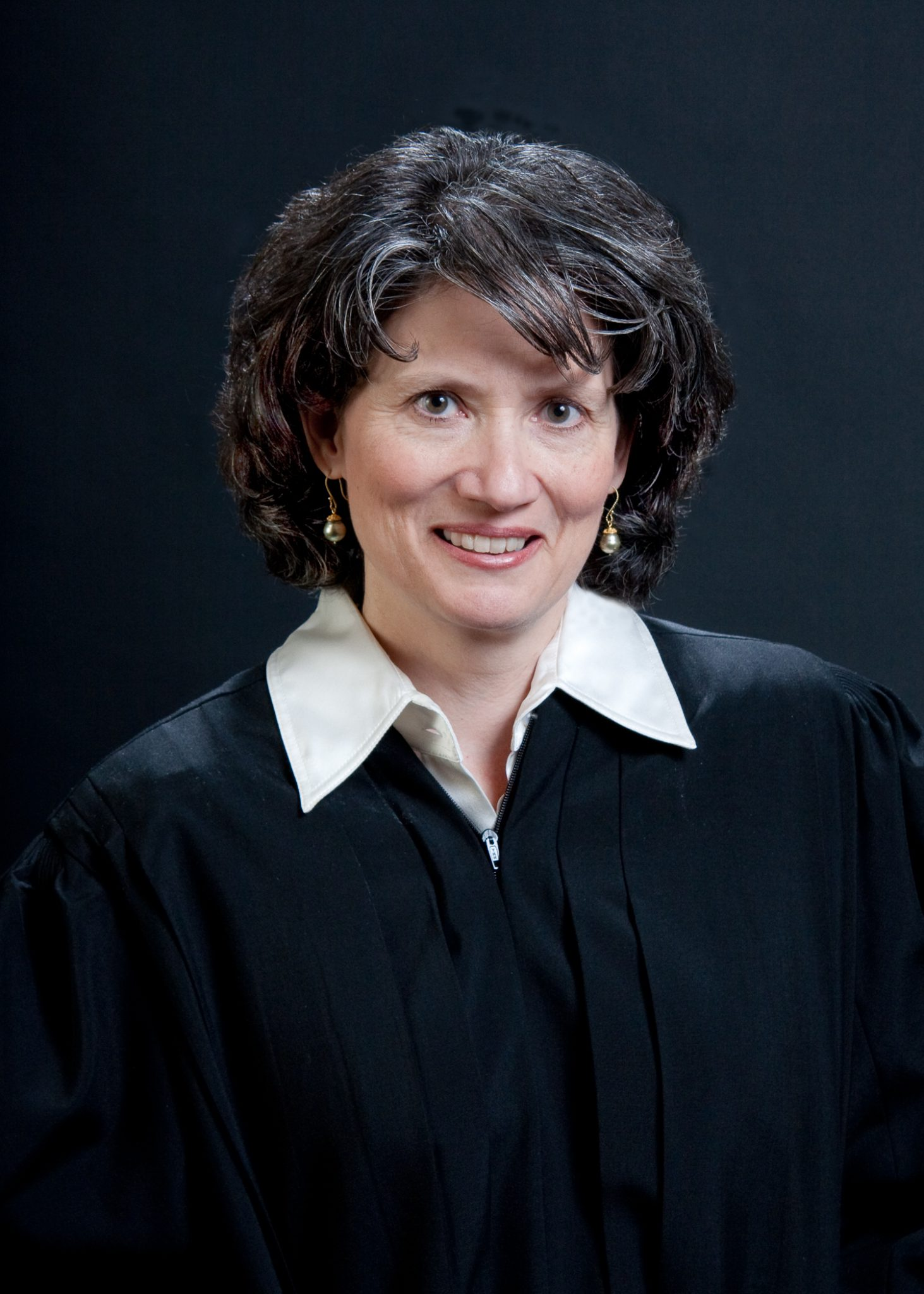
- Official portrait, 2014

Chief Judge of the United States District Court for the Northern District of California
- Incumbent
- Assumed office July 1, 2026
- Preceded by: Richard Seeborg

Judge of the United States District Court for the Northern District of California
- Incumbent
- Assumed office November 21, 2011
- Appointed by: Barack Obama
- Preceded by: Vaughn Walker

Personal details
- Born: Maria Yvonne Gonzalez; February 1, 1965 (age 61) Houston, Texas, U.S.
- Party: Democratic
- Spouse: Matthew Rogers
- Education: Princeton University (BA); University of Texas, Austin (JD)

Maria Yvonne Gonzalez Rogers (born February 1, 1965) is an American lawyer and jurist serving as the chief United States district judge of the U.S. District Court for the Northern District of California. Appointed in 2011 by President Barack Obama, she was previously a California state judge on the Alameda County Superior Court from 2008 to 2011.

== Early life and education ==
Rogers was born Maria Yvonne Gonzalez in 1965 in Houston. She graduated from Princeton University in 1987 with a Bachelor of Arts, cum laude. From 1987 to 1988, she worked as a legal researcher at a law firm in New Haven, Connecticut. She then attended the University of Texas School of Law, graduating in 1991 with a Juris Doctor.

== Career ==
From 1991 until 2003, Rogers worked as a litigator in private practice in San Francisco at the law firm of Cooley Godward LLP (now Cooley LLP). She was an equity partner at the firm from 1999 until 2001. Rogers was a member of the civil grand jury in Alameda County, California from 2005 until 2007, and served as foreperson from 2006 until 2007.

== Judicial career ==
=== State court judicial service ===
Rogers served as a pro tem judge in Alameda County, California from 2007 until 2008. In 2008, Republican Governor Arnold Schwarzenegger appointed Rogers, a Democrat, to the Alameda County Superior Court. She replaced Judge Carlos G. Ynostroza on the bench.

=== Federal judicial service ===
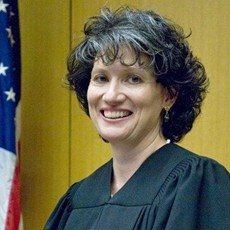
Earlier photo of Judge Rogers

On May 4, 2011, President Barack Obama nominated Rogers to a seat on the United States District Court for the Northern District of California that had been vacated by Judge Vaughn Walker, who retired at the end of 2010. The Senate confirmed her on November 15, 2011, by an 89–6 vote. She received her commission on November 21, 2011. She is the first Latina to serve as a federal judge in the Northern District of California. She became chief judge of the court in 2026.

=== Notable cases ===
Rogers has adjudicated various cases against Apple. In 2012, Rogers dismissed a class action lawsuit with prejudice, upholding Apple's defense that the "Illinois Brick doctrine" from the Supreme Court case Illinois Brick Co. v. Illinois, 431 U.S. 720 (1977) applied, as only the developers of apps could be damaged by Apple's policies, and consumers did not have statutory standing to bring suit on the developers' behalf. The Court specifically noted that the 30% fee Apple collects is "a cost passed-on to consumers by independent software developers". The United States Court of Appeals for the Ninth Circuit reversed her decision, and the Court of Appeals was upheld by the Supreme Court in Apple Inc. v. Pepper.

In December 2014, Rogers presided over a jury trial against Apple, in which plaintiffs claimed digital rights management (DRM) on Apple iTunes violated antitrust laws. On December 16, 2014, the jury reached a verdict in favor of Apple.

Rogers presided over the Epic Games v. Apple case. On August 24, 2020, Rogers issued an order granting a temporary restraining order for Epic's Unreal Engine, finding that the termination of Epic's developer account could result in the inability to "save all the projects by third-party developers relying on the engine that were shelved while support was unavailable." However, Rogers refused to grant a temporary restraining order with respect to Epic's apps, including Fortnite, citing that Epic's current predicament "appears of its own making."

Rogers presided over Musk v. Altman. She is now presiding over the bribery and corruption case against former Oakland mayor Sheng Thao.

Rogers is presiding over the trial of Meta where Meta is accused of harming children with addictive technology and violating federal laws on child privacy and consumer protection with their algorithms and data collection. She is also set the rule on the case with the help of an eight person advisory jury.

== Notable activities ==
Rogers was elected to the American Law Institute in 1990 and was elected to the ALI Council in 2009. She currently chairs the ALI's Membership Committee and serves as an Adviser on ALI's Principles of Election Law: Resolution of Election Disputes project.

== Personal life ==
Rogers' husband, Matthew C. Rogers, served in various positions in the Obama administration. The couple live in Piedmont, California.

== See also ==
- List of first women lawyers and judges in California
- List of Hispanic and Latino American jurists

Legal offices
Preceded by Vaughn Walker	Judge of the United States District Court for the Northern District of California; 2011–present	Incumbent
Preceded by Richard Seeborg	Chief Judge of the United States District Court for the Northern District of California; 2026–present	Incumbent
