= Epic Games v. Google =

Lawsuit by Epic Games against Google

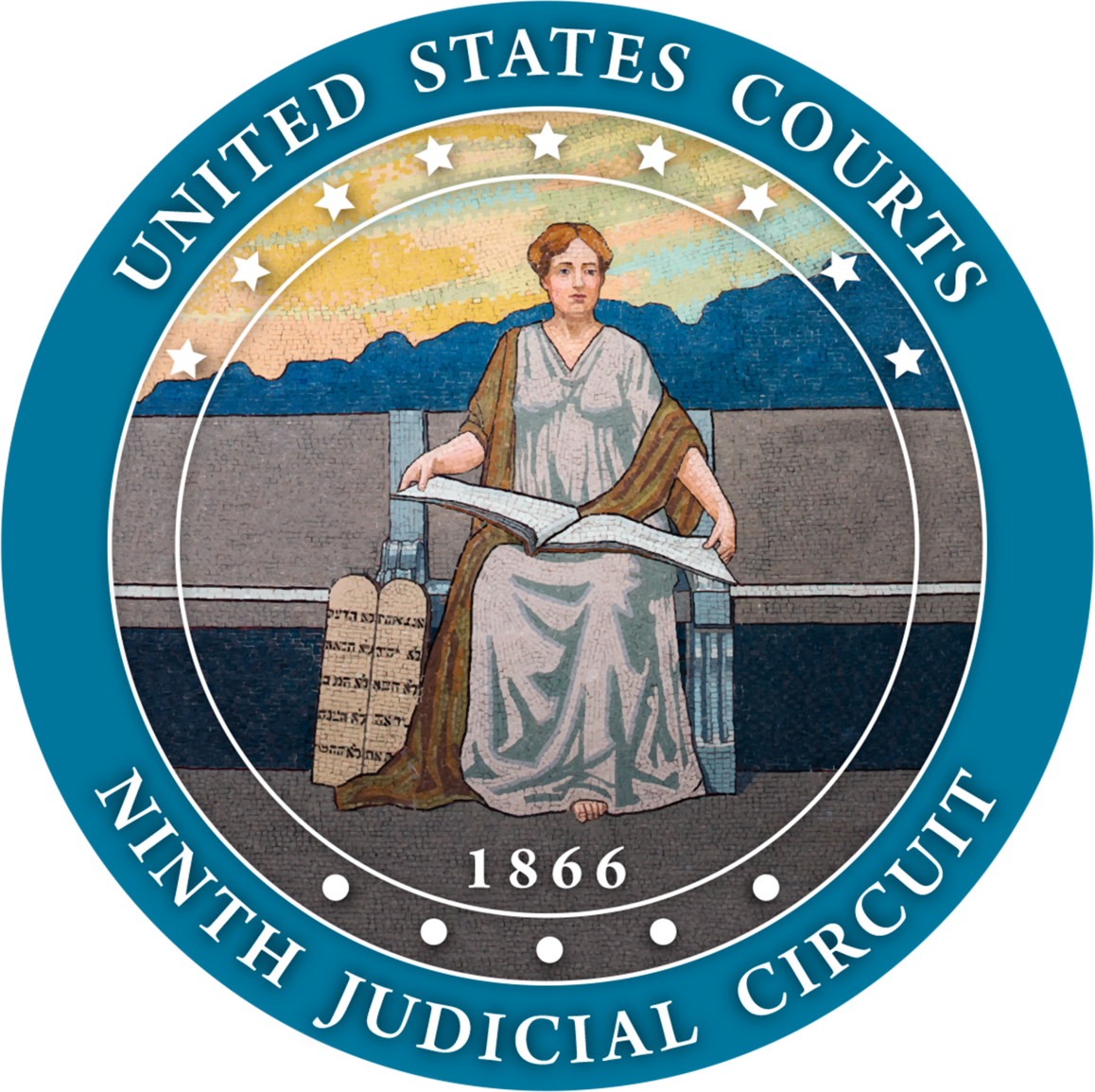
- Court: United States Court of Appeals for the Ninth Circuit
- Full case name: Epic Games, Inc. v. Google Inc.
- Decided: July 31, 2025

Court membership
- Judges sitting: M. Margaret McKeown, Danielle J. Forrest, Gabriel P. Sanchez

Epic Games v. Google, 147 F.4th 917 (9th Cir. 2025), later known as In re Google Play Store Antitrust Litigation, was a ruling of the United States Court of Appeals for the Ninth Circuit, regarding accusations of monopolistic behavior in the operations of the Google Play Store and sales of apps for Android devices. After a ruling in favor of Epic Games at the Ninth Circuit, the parties reached an agreement on redesigned app store practices in March 2026.

== Background ==
Google operates the Google Play Store for Android devices. Similar to Apple and its App Store for iOS devices, Google customarily took a 30% share of the revenue from all sales made through the Play Store, including in-app purchases. This 30% revenue share had become common practice among digital storefronts by 2019.

Epic had released Fortnite Battle Royale for computers and consoles in 2017 as a free to play title supported by microtransactions, allowing players to buy in-game "V-bucks" currency for cosmetic items. When Fortnite was brought to mobile devices in 2018, Epic initially released the game through sideloading to avoid Google's charges for in-game sales. However, this led to a number of clones, some with malicious behavior, appearing in the Google Play Store and masquerading as the real Fortnite game. Epic eventually discontinued the sideloaded version in favor of a legitimate Google Play version in 2020.

Tim Sweeney, the CEO of Epic Games, had been outspoken about Google's 30% fee, believing that storefronts could still be profitable while taking a lesser percentage. Epic launched its own Epic Games Store in 2018 to demonstrate that a digital storefront could be profitable while taking less than a 30% revenue share, using 12% for its store.

In 2020, Epic initiated "Project Liberty" to challenge the 30% revenue fees collected by the Google and Apple app stores. Both the Android and iOS versions of Fortnite were updated with code to allow players to buy V-bucks directly from Epic. This practice violated the allowable terms for apps offered by Google and Apple, and Fortnite was removed from these storefronts that same day. Epic reacted by filing lawsuits against both Google and Apple in the United States District Court for the Northern District of California, accusing the companies of engaging in monopolistic behavior.

In initiating the lawsuits against Google and Apple, Epic did not seek monetary damages but instead sought "injunctive relief to allow fair competition in these two key markets that directly affect hundreds of millions of consumers and tens of thousands, if not more, of third-party app developers." In comments on social media, Sweeney said "we're fighting for the freedom of people who bought smartphones to install apps from sources of their choosing, the freedom for creators of apps to distribute them as they choose, and the freedom of both groups to do business directly. The primary opposing argument is: 'Smartphone makers can do whatever they want.' This as an awful notion.We all have rights, and we need to fight to defend our rights against whoever would deny them."

In its specific claim against Google, Epic argued that the company used aggressive deal-making with partners to maintain the dominance of the Google Play Store. In response to the lawsuit, Google stated to The Verge that "For game developers who choose to use the Play Store, we have consistent policies that are fair to developers and keep the store safe for users. While Fortnite remains available on Android, we can no longer make it available on Play because it violates our policies. However, we welcome the opportunity to continue our discussions with Epic and bring Fortnite back to Google Play." Google also distanced itself from the Apple case, asserting that the Android operating system does not have the same single storefront restriction as Apple's iOS, and thus allows different Android phone manufacturers to bundle different storefronts and apps as they desire. Google said they negotiated with Epic Games far differently than Apple did.

Google countersued Epic in October 2021, asserting that by introducing a version of Fortnite that did not use Google Play's payment systems, Epic had violated their contract with Google, and because that version of the game could be obtained in other formats outside of Google Play. Thus, Epic "has alternatively been unjustly enriched at Google's expense."

Also in 2021, Google was sued by a coalition of 36 states and the District of Columbia over its app store practices, mirroring several of Epic's complaints. That lawsuit was settled in September 2023, with Google agreeing to pay $700 million as part of the settlement. In addition, Google stated it would allow selected apps to use a new "User Choice Billing" option, which lets apps charge users directly without having to go through the Play Store payment system, though developers would still need to pay a 26% revenue sharing fee back to Google. The settlement also loosened requirements for third-party storefronts sharing space with the Play Store.

In the meantime, Epic joined other firms including Match.com and Spotify to create the Coalition for App Fairness, an advocacy group to challenge Apple and Google's practices on their respective app stores. The Match Group, which runs several platforms including Tinder and Match.com, launched its own lawsuit against Google over its app store policies in May 2022, also with complaints similar to those raised by Epic. Google and Match Group settled in November 2023, before Epic's trial, with Google paying Match Group $40 million and allowing the company to use its User Choice Payment system.

== District Court ruling ==
Filed concurrently with Epic Games v. Apple, Epic challenged Google's monopolistic practices in its Google Play Store while selling apps for its Android devices. The jury trial was held at the District Court for the Northern District of California in late 2023 with District Court Judge James Donato presiding. Epic was able to show the numerous deals that Google had made with its partners to maintain the strength of the Google Play store and disadvantage other storefronts. Among these was "Project Hug", an effort to work with twenty mobile publishers to keep their games and apps within the Play Store, with hundreds of millions of dollars paid to maintain this agreement. Similarly, "Project Banyan" referred to a deal made with Samsung Electronics to weaken the competition from that company's Galaxy Store on Android devices.

Epic showed that Google had become concerned about Epic's actions and saw the company as a disrupting influence that might encourage other developers to offer popular apps via sideloading, which could potentially cost Google $2 billion a year in revenue. Google allegedly looked into acquiring a controlling portion of Epic to discourage this strategy. Epic also discovered that Google had made a number of sweetheart deals with specific apps to avoid or reduce Play Store or User Choice Billing fees, such as with Spotify and Netflix. Google was also found to have deleted certain chat messages that were relevant to the case, which was said to undercut Google's credibility to the jury.

The jury issued its verdict on December 11, ruling on all eleven counts in favor of Epic. The jury affirmed that Google had engaged in anti-competitive practices both with the Play Store and its billing system, and maintained its monopoly through deals with partners using its dominant position in the technology market. The jury also found that Google strengthened its position by requiring the Play Store to be installed on third-party Android hardware such as Samsung phones. Determination of relief given the jury's findings was scheduled to take place starting in January 2024.

Epic submitted recommendations for injunctions that the District Court could place on Google, based on the jury's decision, including preventing Google from initiating deals like "Project Hug" and prohibiting the tying of Google Play with operating systems on Android phones. Hearings on the proposed injunctions were held in August 2024. In October, Judge Donato issued a permanent injunction requiring Google to allow alternative app stores on Android phones. For the following three years, Google would not be permitted to pay or provide discounts to developers that release exclusively through the Play Store. Google's compliance would be overseen by a three-person committee of employees of both companies.

== Appeals Court ruling ==
Google appealed the District Court's injunctions and requested an emergency stay from the Ninth Circuit Court of Appeals. The stay was granted temporarily to allow Google time to organize its appeal, though in the meantime the company was prohibited from making deals with Android phone manufactures in exchange for blocking third-party app stores. Google attempted an appeal to the U.S. Supreme Court, but the high court declined to review the case, thus leaving the injunctions intact. Epic stated immediately after this decision that they intended to bring Fortnite and the Epic Games Store to Google Play in the United States.

Epic and Google announced a proposed settlement in November 2025, with Google offering to reduce its take on store purchases to between 9 and 20%, and to allow apps like the Epic Games Store to register as approved app stores on Android in all regions of the world. Judge Donato expressed concern about the terms of this settlement, as it would not significantly change the practices at Google that were deemed anti-competitive by the jury in the original District Court hearing. In March 2026, Epic and Google announced a completed deal in which new and existing installations of Epic apps would be charged 20% or less by Google depending on the situation. Ars Technica declared that "the flat 30 percent Play Store share is well and truly dead," with the new payment structure to be implemented across Google Play Store.

Google cleared Fortnite to return to the Play Store worldwide by March 19, 2026. The first third-party app store, Aptoide, was approved and released by August 2026.
