= Stinson v. United States =

- Supreme Court of the United States

Argued March 24, 1993 Decided May 3, 1993
- Full case name: Terry Lynn Stinson, Petitioner v. United States
- Citations: 508 U.S. 36 (more) 113 S. Ct. 1913; 123 L. Ed. 2d 598; 1993 U.S. LEXIS 3124

Holding
- The Guidelines Manual's commentary which interprets or explains a guideline is authoritative unless it violates the Constitution or a federal statute, or is inconsistent with, or a plainly erroneous reading of, that guideline.

Court membership
- Chief Justice William Rehnquist Associate Justices Byron White · Harry Blackmun; John P. Stevens · Sandra Day O'Connor; Antonin Scalia · Anthony Kennedy; David Souter · Clarence Thomas

Case opinion
- Majority: Kennedy, joined by unanimous

Stinson v. United States, 508 U.S. 36 (1993), is a decision of the United States Supreme Court that held Sentencing Commission guidelines may be cited as binding authority when courts issue sentences for criminal defendants.

== Background ==
The case was argued at the Supreme Court March 24, 1993 by William Mallory Kent on behalf of Stinson and Paul J. Larkin for the Solicitor General of the United States. With Mr. Larkin on the Solicitor General's brief were also Acting Solicitor General Bryson, Acting Assistant Attorney General John Keeney, and John F. DePue. Robert Augustus Harper filed a brief on behalf of the Florida Association of Criminal Defense Lawyers as amicus curiae.

== Opinion of the Court ==
In Justice Anthony Kennedy's unanimous majority opinion, the Court ruled that commentary issued by the United States Sentencing Commission (which promulgates the United States Sentencing Guidelines) that interprets or explains a guideline is authoritative unless it violates the Constitution or a federal statute, or is inconsistent with, or a plainly erroneous reading of, that guideline.

== Subsequent impact ==
The Stinson decision has had broad influence having been cited in over 1,000 other federal appellate decisions, including both Blakely v. Washington (2004) and United States v. Booker (2005) the cases which rewrote federal guideline sentencing law. The Stinson decision has additionally been cited in over 3,700 appellate briefs and over 250 law reviews.

== See also ==
- List of United States Supreme Court cases, volume 508
- List of United States Supreme Court cases
- Lists of United States Supreme Court cases by volume
- List of United States Supreme Court cases by the Rehnquist Court
