= Johnson v. Robison =

- Supreme Court of the United States

Argued December 11, 1973 Decided March 4, 1974
- Full case name: Johnson, Administrator of Veterans' Affairs, et al. v. Robison
- Citations: 415 U.S. 361 (more) 94 S. Ct. 1160; 39 L. Ed. 2d 389; 1974 U.S. LEXIS 108

Case history
- Prior: District Court for the District of Massachusetts decision for Robison, 352 F. Supp. 848;

Holding
- Providing different benefits for uniformed veterans and conscientious objectors does not violate equal protection or the free exercise clause.

Court membership
- Chief Justice Warren E. Burger Associate Justices William O. Douglas · William J. Brennan Jr. Potter Stewart · Byron White; Thurgood Marshall · Harry Blackmun; Lewis F. Powell Jr. · William Rehnquist

Case opinions
- Majority: Brennan, joined by Burger, Stewart, White, Marshall, Blackmun, Powell, Rehnquist
- Dissent: Douglas

Laws applied
- U.S. Const., amends. I, XIV

Johnson v. Robison, 415 U.S. 361 (1974), was a case heard before the United States Supreme Court. The court held that the Veterans' Administrations' allocation of greater educational benefits to combat veterans than conscientious objectors was consistent with the United States Constitution. Robison, a conscientious objector, argued that such unequal benefits violated his 5th Amendment right to Equal Protection and his First Amendment right to free exercise of religion. The court rejected both arguments.

== Opinion of the Court ==
The court reasoned that a rational basis existed to give combat veterans better benefits than those who objected for religious reasons: namely, encouraging people to participate in the armed forces as soldiers. The court reasoned that the increased disruption and longer commitment for soldiers justified disparate allocation of benefits. As to free exercise, the court held that the withholding of benefits had only an incidental burden, if any, on religious exercise, that that burden was not intended, and that it was justified by the substantial government interest in raising an army.

The Court also held that 38 USC section 211(a) does not preclude constitutional challenges to law administered by the Veteran's Administration.
