= Franchise Tax Board of California v. Hyatt (disambiguation) =

There have been three U.S. Supreme Court cases titled Franchise Tax Board of California v. Hyatt:

- Franchise Tax Board of California v. Hyatt (2003), 538 U.S. 488 (2003)
- Franchise Tax Board of California v. Hyatt (2016), 578 U.S. ___ (2016)
- Franchise Tax Board of California v. Hyatt (2019), 587 U.S. ___ (2019)
