= Merrick Garland Supreme Court nomination =

United States Supreme Court nomination

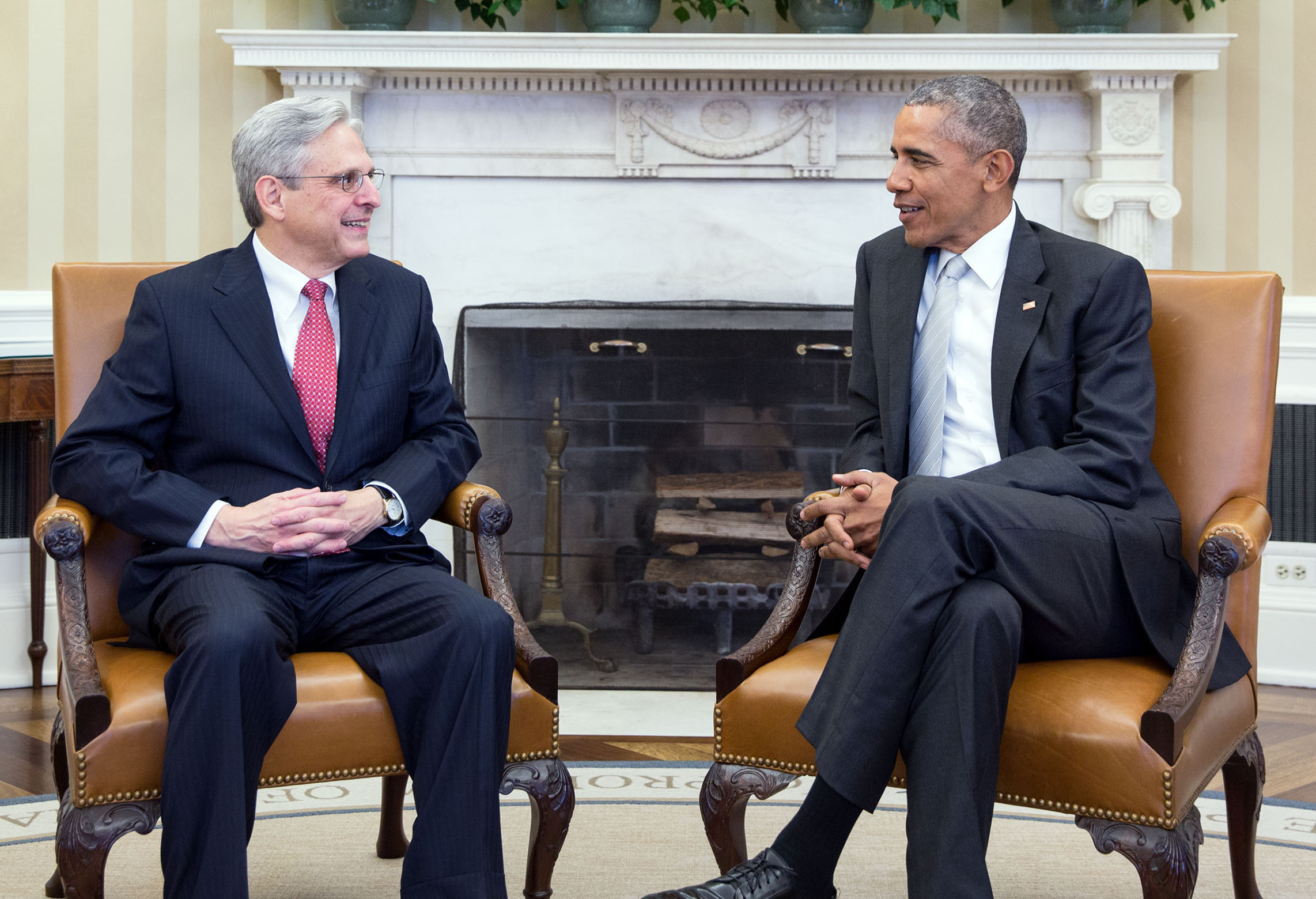
- Garland with President Obama on March 17, 2016 shortly after his nomination was announced
- Nominee: Merrick Garland
- Nominated by: Barack Obama (president of the United States)
- Succeeding: Antonin Scalia (associate justice)
- Date nominated: March 16, 2016
- Date lapsed: January 3, 2017
- Outcome: Nomination lapsed without action

On March 16, 2016, President Barack Obama nominated Merrick Garland for Associate Justice of the Supreme Court of the United States to succeed Antonin Scalia, who had died one month earlier. At the time of his nomination, Garland was the chief judge of the United States Court of Appeals for the District of Columbia Circuit.

This vacancy arose during Obama's final year as president. Hours after Scalia's death was announced, Senate Majority Leader Mitch McConnell said he would consider any appointment by the sitting president to be null and void. He said the next Supreme Court justice should be chosen by the next president—to be elected later that year. Senate Democrats criticized the move as being unprecedented. They argued that there was sufficient time to vote on a nominee before the election.

Scalia's death brought about an unusual, but not unprecedented, situation in which a Democratic president had the opportunity to nominate a Supreme Court justice with the Republican controlled United States Senate. Before 2016, such a situation had last arisen in 1895, when a Republican-led Senate confirmed Democrat Grover Cleveland's nomination of Rufus Wheeler Peckham to the court in a voice vote; conversely, in 1988 a Democratic-led Senate had confirmed Republican Ronald Reagan's nomination of Anthony Kennedy and in 1991, a Senate held 57–43 by Democrats nevertheless confirmed Justice Clarence Thomas. Political commentators at the time widely recognized Scalia as one of the most conservative members of the court, and noted that—while many considered Merrick Garland a centrist, and he had been called "essentially the model, neutral judge"—a replacement less conservative than Scalia could have shifted the court's ideological balance for many years into the future. The confirmation of Garland would have given Democratic appointees a majority on the Supreme Court for the first time since the 1970 confirmation of Harry Blackmun.

The 11 members of the Senate Judiciary Committee's Republican majority refused to conduct the hearings necessary to advance the vote to the Senate at large, and Garland's nomination expired on January 3, 2017, with the end of the 114th Congress, 293 days after it had been submitted to the Senate. This marked the first time since the Civil War that a nominee whose nomination had not been withdrawn had failed to receive consideration for an open seat on the court. Obama's successor, Republican Donald Trump, nominated Judge Neil Gorsuch to fill the vacancy on January 31, 2017, soon after taking office.

== Background ==
=== Death of Antonin Scalia ===
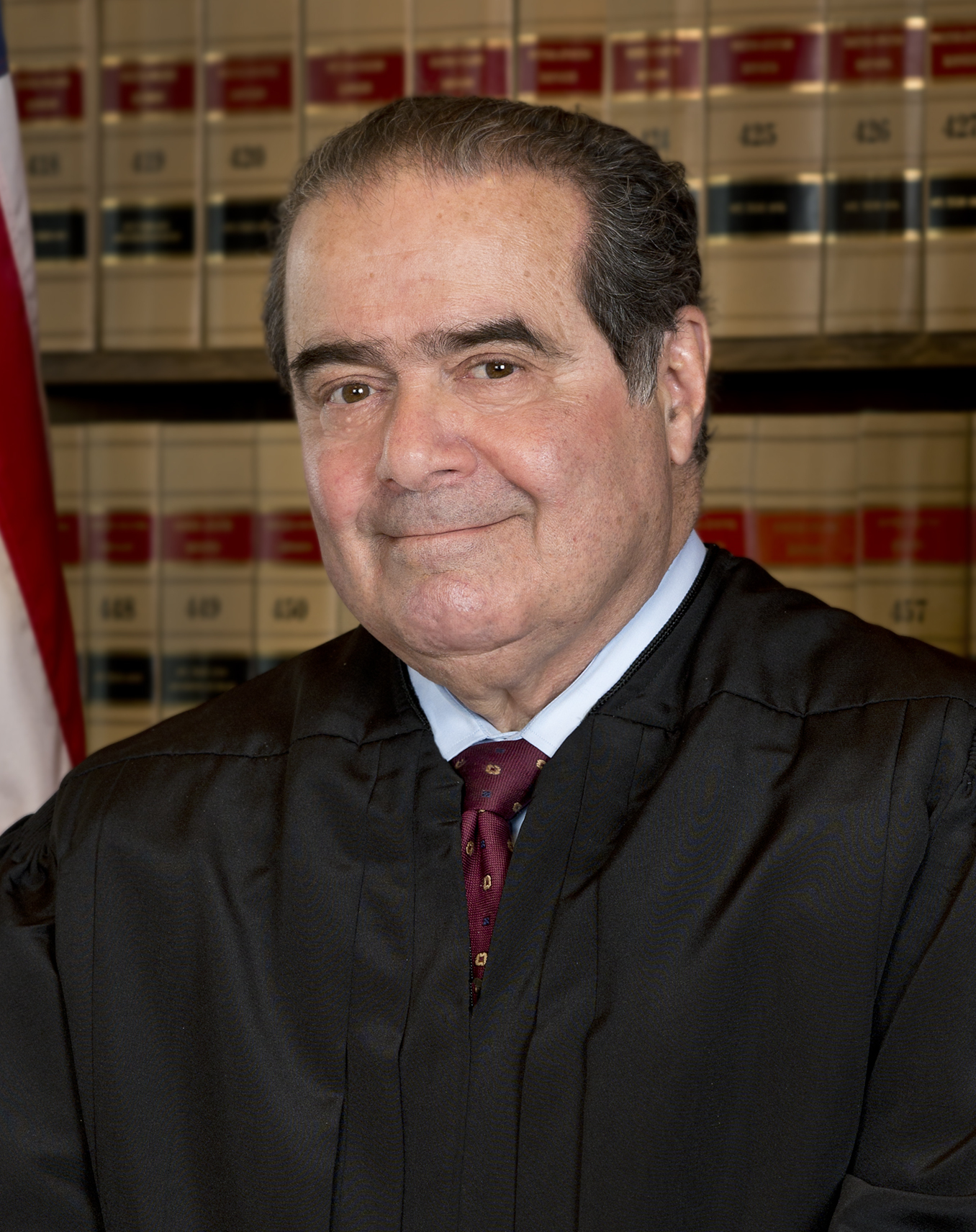
Associate Justice Antonin Scalia

On February 13, 2016, Associate Justice Antonin Scalia died unexpectedly while at the Cibolo Creek Ranch in Shafter, Texas. He was the second of three Supreme Court justices to die in office during the 21st century: following Chief Justice William Rehnquist in 2005; and followed by Associate Justice Ruth Bader Ginsburg in 2020. Before Rehnquist, the last incumbent justice to die was Robert H. Jackson in 1954.

Scalia had been appointed associate justice by President Ronald Reagan in September 1986 to fill the vacancy caused by the elevation of William Rehnquist to chief justice, and was unanimously confirmed by the Senate. He went on to become a part of the court's conservative bloc, often supporting originalist and textualist positions on the interpretation of the Constitution.

The vacancy on the Court created by Scalia's death came during a U.S. presidential election year, the seventh time since 1900 that this has happened. Article II, Section 2, Clause 2 of the United States Constitution grants plenary power to the president to nominate, and with the advice and consent of the Senate, appoint justices to the Supreme Court. At the time of Scalia's death, the incumbent president was Barack Obama, a member of the Democratic Party, while the Republican Party held a 54–46 seat majority in the Senate. Because of the ideological composition of the Court at the time of Scalia's death, and the belief that President Obama could replace Scalia with a much more liberal successor, some concluded that an Obama appointee could potentially swing the Court in a liberal direction for many years to come, with potentially far-reaching political consequences.

=== Biden rule debate ===
Scalia's election-year death triggered a protracted political battle that did not end until 2017 after a new president had been inaugurated. The Senate's Republican leadership was quick to assert that the vacancy should not be filled until after the 2016 presidential election. They cited a June 1992 speech by then-senator Joe Biden, in which Biden argued that President Bush should wait until after the election to appoint a replacement if a Supreme Court seat became vacant during the summer or should appoint a moderate acceptable to the then-Democratic Senate, as a precedent. Republicans later began to refer to this idea as the "Biden rule". Biden responded that his position was and remained that the president and Congress should "work together to overcome partisan differences" regarding judicial nominations.

PolitiFact noted that Biden's speech was later in the election year than when the GOP blocked Garland, there was no Supreme Court vacancy, there was no nominee under consideration, the Democratic-led Senate never adopted this as a rule, and that Biden did not object to Bush nominating judicial nominees after Election Day.

Democrats also countered that the U.S. Constitution obliged the president to nominate and obliged the Senate to give its advice and consent in a timely manner. Republicans argued in response that the Senate was fulfilling its obligation of advice and consent by saying that the next president should make the appointment. There were, however, 11 months left to President Obama's term at the time of Scalia's death, and the Democrats argued that no precedent existed for such a lengthy delay and that previous presidents had nominated individuals in election years. Democrats also argued that even if such a precedent existed, President Obama's term had sufficient time remaining that such a precedent would not apply. The precedent, known as the Thurmond rule, dated back to President Lyndon B. Johnson's 1968 nomination of Abe Fortas to become chief justice, but had since been inconsistently applied.

Republicans cited comments previously made by Harry Reid in support of their stance that there was no requirement to hold a vote. In 2005, Reid had stated that "Nowhere in [the US Constitution] does it say the Senate has a duty to give Presidential nominees a vote. It says appointments shall be made with the advice and consent of the Senate. That is very different than saying every nominee receives a vote".

Republicans also cited the "Schumer standard", which was a comment made previously by Chuck Schumer, in support of their position. In July 2007, as Senate majority leader, Schumer had stated that the Senate should not confirm a further Bush nominee to the Supreme Court, except in "extraordinary circumstances". In response, Schumer stated that his comment was intended only to apply to nominees "out of the mainstream" rather than being a complete refusal.

On February 23, the 11 Republican members of the Senate Judiciary Committee signed a letter to Senate majority leader Mitch McConnell stating their unprecedented intention to withhold consent on any nominee made by President Obama, and that no hearings would occur until after January 20, 2017, when the next president took office. This position subsequently became known as the "McConnell rule" though also not a formal rule of the Senate. That August, McConnell, who played an instrumental role in keeping Merrick Garland from filling Scalia's vacant seat, declared to a crowd in Kentucky, "One of my proudest moments was when I looked at Barack Obama in the eye and I said, 'Mr. President, you will not fill the Supreme Court vacancy.'"

McConnell later called the question of whether the rule should become Senate policy "absurd", stating that "neither side, had the shoe been on the other foot, would have filled [the vacant seat]".

=== Scholars and lawyers urging Senate to consider a nominee ===
On February 24, 2016, a group of progressive-leaning U.S. constitutional-law scholars sent an open letter to President Obama and the U.S. Senate urging the president to nominate a candidate to fill the vacancy and the Senate to hold hearings and vote on the nominee. The letter, which was organized by the progressive American Constitution Society, stated that it would be "unprecedented" for the Senate to fail to consider a Supreme Court nominee, and "would leave a vacancy that would undermine the ability of the Supreme Court to carry out its constitutional duties." The signatories wrote that "the Senate's constitutional duty to 'advise and consent'—the process that has come to include hearings, committee votes, and floor votes—has no exception for election years. In fact, over the course of American history, there have been 24 instances in which presidents in the last year of a term have nominated individuals for the Supreme Court and the Senate confirmed 21 of these nominees." Among the 33 professors signing the letter were Dean Erwin Chemerinsky of the University of California, Irvine School of Law; Adam Winkler of the UCLA School of Law; Kermit Roosevelt III of the University of Pennsylvania School of Law, and Gene Nichol of the University of North Carolina School of Law.

In a letter sent to President Obama on March 3, 2016, a different group of predominantly progressive scholars of American history, politics, and the law wrote to President Obama to "express our dismay at the unprecedented breach of norms by the Senate majority in refusing to consider a nomination for the Supreme Court made by a president with eleven months to serve in the position." The scholars wrote:

It is technically in the power of the Senate to engage in aggressive denial on presidential nominations. But we believe that the Framers' construction of the process of nominations and confirmation to federal courts, including the Senate's power of "advice and consent," does not anticipate or countenance an obdurate refusal by the body to acknowledge or consider a president's nominee, especially to the highest court in the land. The refusal to hold hearings and deliberate on a nominee at this level is truly unprecedented and, in our view, dangerous ...

The Constitution gives the Senate every right to deny confirmation to a presidential nomination. But denial should come after the Senate deliberates over the nomination, which in contemporary times includes hearings in the Judiciary Committee, and full debate and votes on the Senate floor. Anything less than that, in our view, is a serious and, indeed, unprecedented breach of the Senate's best practices and noblest traditions for much of our nation's history.

Signatories to this letter included, among others, Thomas E. Mann, senior fellow at the Brookings Institution; Norman J. Ornstein, resident scholar at the American Enterprise Institute; presidential historian Doris Kearns Goodwin; Pamela S. Karlan of Stanford Law School; Yale Law School professor Harold Hongju Koh; Geoffrey R. Stone of the University of Chicago Law School; and historian James M. McPherson of Princeton University.

On March 7, 2016, a group of 356 law professors and other legal scholars released a letter (organized through the progressive judicial advocacy group Alliance for Justice) to the Senate leadership of both parties urging them "to fulfill your constitutional duty to give President Obama's Supreme Court nominee a prompt and fair hearing and a timely vote." The letter writers argued that Senate Republicans' announcement that they would refuse to consider any Obama nominee was a "preemptive abdication of duty" that "is contrary to the process the framers envisioned in Article II, and threatens to diminish the integrity of our democratic institutions and the functioning of our constitutional government." Among the signatories to this letter were prominent law professors Charles Ogletree, Kenji Yoshino, and Laurence Tribe.

On March 9, 2016, in a letter to Obama and Senate leadership, a group of almost 250 prominent corporate lawyers urged the Senate to hold hearings on the president's nominee. The letter stated that "When a vacancy on the court arises, the Constitution is clear ... Article II, Section 2 states that the President 'shall nominate, and by and with the advice and consent of the Senate, shall appoint ... judges of the Supreme Court' ... Though the Senate may ultimately choose not to consent to the president's nominee, it would be unprecedented for the Senate to refuse to perform its 'advice and consent' role in this context. Not only does the Constitution direct the sitting president to nominate an individual to fill a vacancy on the court no matter whether it is an election year, nearly one third of all presidents have nominated a justice in an election year who was eventually confirmed." The letter, organized by the Lawyers' Committee for Civil Rights Under Law, also expressed concern about the "profound effect" of an under-staffed Court on the national economy, particularly in close cases. Signatories to the letter came from a number of national law firms, as well as counsel for Google Inc.

On March 10, 2016, the Democratic attorneys general of 19 states, Puerto Rico, and the District of Columbia released a letter to Obama and Senate leadership in both parties calling for prompt Senate action on the president's (then yet-to-be-named) nominee. The letter stated that "the states and territories have a unique and pressing interest in a full and functioning Supreme Court" and that refusal to consider a nominee would "undermine the rule of law and ultimately impair the functioning of state governments."

In March 2016, former Utah governor Jon Huntsman Jr., a Republican, and former Connecticut U.S. senator Joseph Lieberman, an independent, both co-chairs of the problem-solving group No Labels, wrote that "there is no modern precedent for the blockade that Senate Republicans have put in place. Even highly-contentious nomination battles in the past, including those over Robert Bork and Justice Clarence Thomas, followed the normal process of hearings and an up-or-down vote. Leaving the current blockade in place could leave a seat on the Court vacant for the remainder of this term and perhaps the next as well, which could leave major cases in limbo until 2018. That is simply not acceptable. We cannot let today's crisis of leadership turn into a full-blown constitutional crisis."

That same month, John Joseph Gibbons and Patricia Wald, the former chief judges of the Third Circuit and D.C. Circuit, respectively, warned that the Senate's refusal to act on a Supreme Court nomination "would set a dangerous precedent, and invite attempts to extend it to other situations where the Executive and the Legislative branches are in political conflict with one another." Gibbons was appointed by a Republican president, while Wald was appointed by a Democratic president.

Law professors Robin Bradley Kar and Jason Mazzone, in a May 2016 study published in the NYU Law Review Online, called the situation "unprecedented," noting that the Senate had never before transferred a president's appointment power in comparable circumstances to an unknown successor.

=== Scholarly and legal counterarguments ===
George Mason University law professor Ilya Somin argued the Constitution imposes no such duty upon the Senate to hold confirmation hearings and to give a nominee an up-or-down vote. Jonathan H. Adler agreed, writing that while he personally has "long argued that the Senate should promptly consider and vote on every presidential judicial nominee, ... there is no textual or historical basis" for the contention that the Senate has a constitutional obligation to do so. Eugene Volokh argues that there has not been a "constant practice of Senators agreeing that every nominee should be considered without regard to there being a looming election" and that "in the absence of such a practice, we come down to more results-oriented politics." George Mason University law professor David Bernstein argued that while "preexisting constitutional norms" would suggest that "hearings and eventual votes on Supreme Court nominees" were mandatory, this norm is not required by the constitutional text and has been undermined by recent political practice.

Bernstein also noted that a Democratic-controlled Senate in 1960, in reaction to President Eisenhower's 1956 recess appointment of William J. Brennan Jr., passed a Senate resolution "Expressing the sense of the Senate that the president should not make recess appointments to the Supreme Court, except to prevent or end a breakdown in the administration of the Court's business." Noah Feldman, a constitutional law professor at Harvard Law School, has said "it's hard to argue that [the Constitution] requires the [Senate] to put a nominee to a vote." Vikram Amar, constitutional law professor and dean of the University of Illinois College of Law, wrote that "the text of the Constitution certainly does not use any language suggesting the Senate has a legal obligation to do anything", but that the "absolutist position" taken by Senate Republicans presents "grave risks" of escalating the judicial-appointment process into "extreme moves and countermoves."

== Nomination ==
=== Potential candidates ===
Prior to Obama's nomination of Merrick Garland, media commentators speculated about who might be nominated to fill the vacancy on the Court. A number of writers argued that the Senate Republicans would continue to block the confirmation process regardless of the nominee, and suggested that Obama may as well choose a candidate for political motives. For instance, Michael Tomasky suggested that a nomination of Mariano-Florentino Cuéllar may encourage Latinos to vote in the November 2016 election and "alter the presidential race dramatically as well." Tom Goldstein, arguing that "[t]he nomination itself is part of the president's legacy, even if partisan politics prevents confirmation," recommended nominating a black woman to encourage black and female voters to participate in the election. Goldstein concluded that the most likely candidate of such description was Ketanji Brown Jackson.

Other commentators suggested that Obama should compromise by selecting a centrist or even moderate conservative candidate. After analyzing voting trends for Supreme Court nominees since the confirmation of Hugo Black in 1937, political scientists Charles Cameron and Jonathan Kastellec explained that "even an ideological twin of Justice Stephen Breyer—the most moderate of the court's current liberals—would fail to get even a majority of votes in the current Senate". Without naming potential nominees, Cameron and Kastellec concluded that the Senate would only approve "a highly qualified moderate." In that vein, Senate Minority Leader Harry Reid suggested the nomination of Republican Governor Brian Sandoval. However, Sandoval soon withdrew his name from consideration. Zachary A. Goldfarb and Jeffrey Toobin speculated that Obama might nominate Sri Srinivasan because he "has the sort of impeccable credentials that are much beloved by the Supreme Court bar" and that his reputation as a moderate liberal may appeal to conservatives in the Senate.

By early March 2016, Obama reportedly scheduled interviews with five candidates—Merrick Garland, Ketanji Brown Jackson, Jane L. Kelly, Sri Srinivasan, and Paul J. Watford—before narrowing the list down to three candidates: Srinivasan, Garland, and Watford. Garland had been interviewed for a seat on the Court in 2010, when Justice Elena Kagan was selected to succeed the retiring John Paul Stevens. Back in 2010, Republican senator Orrin G. Hatch publicly said that he had urged Obama to nominate Garland as "a consensus nominee" who would easily win Senate confirmation. In the first half of March 2016, Hatch said that refusal to now consider any Obama nominee to the high court was "the chickens coming home to roost", and he cited historical episodes as well as old quotations from Democratic senators to explain why.

On March 11, 2016, Senator Hatch said that Obama "could easily name Merrick Garland, who is a fine man. He probably won't do that because this appointment is about the election. So I am pretty sure he'll name someone the liberal Democratic base wants."

=== Announcement ===
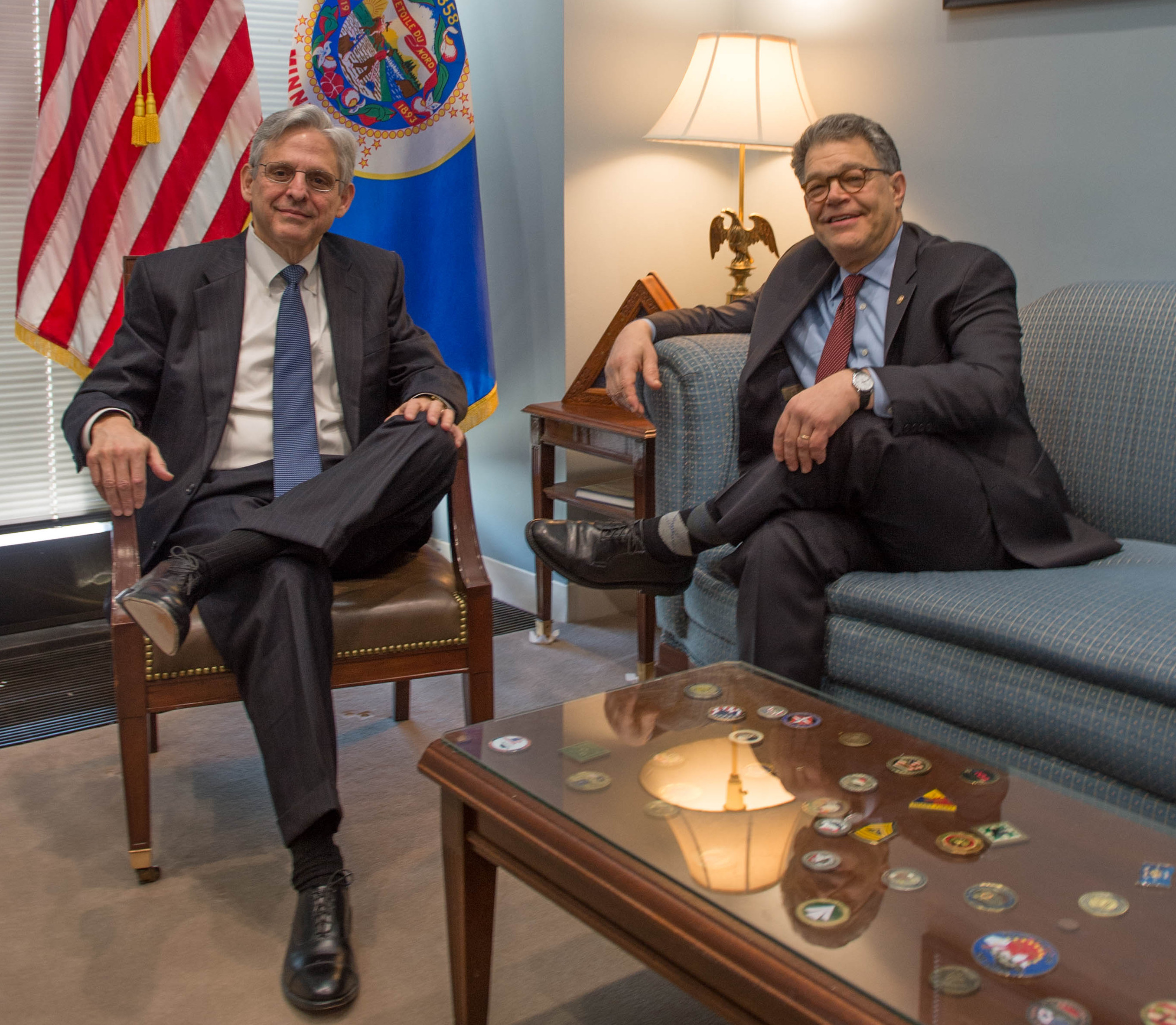
Garland meeting with Democratic U.S. Senator Al Franken

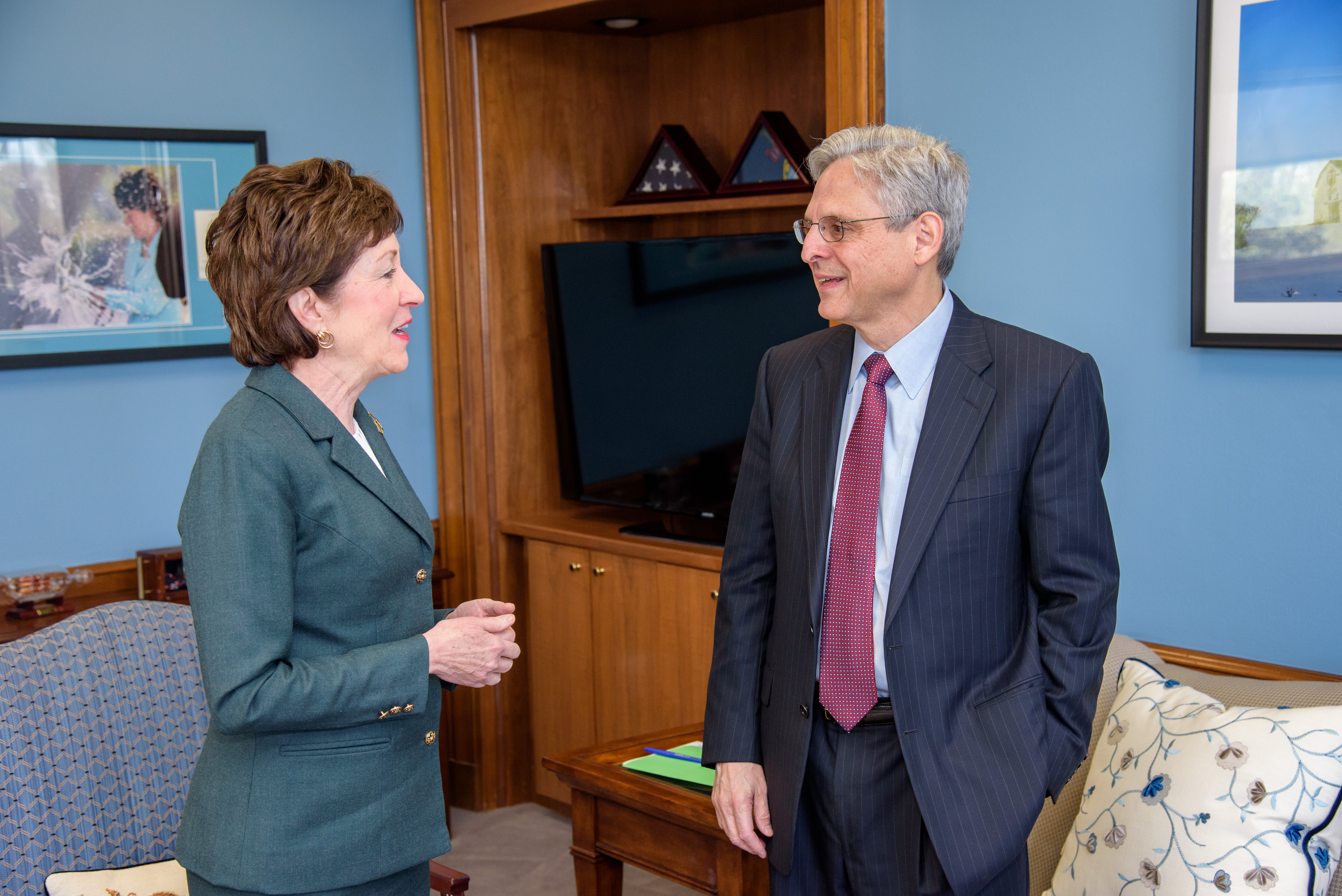
Merrick Garland with Republican U.S. Senator Susan Collins

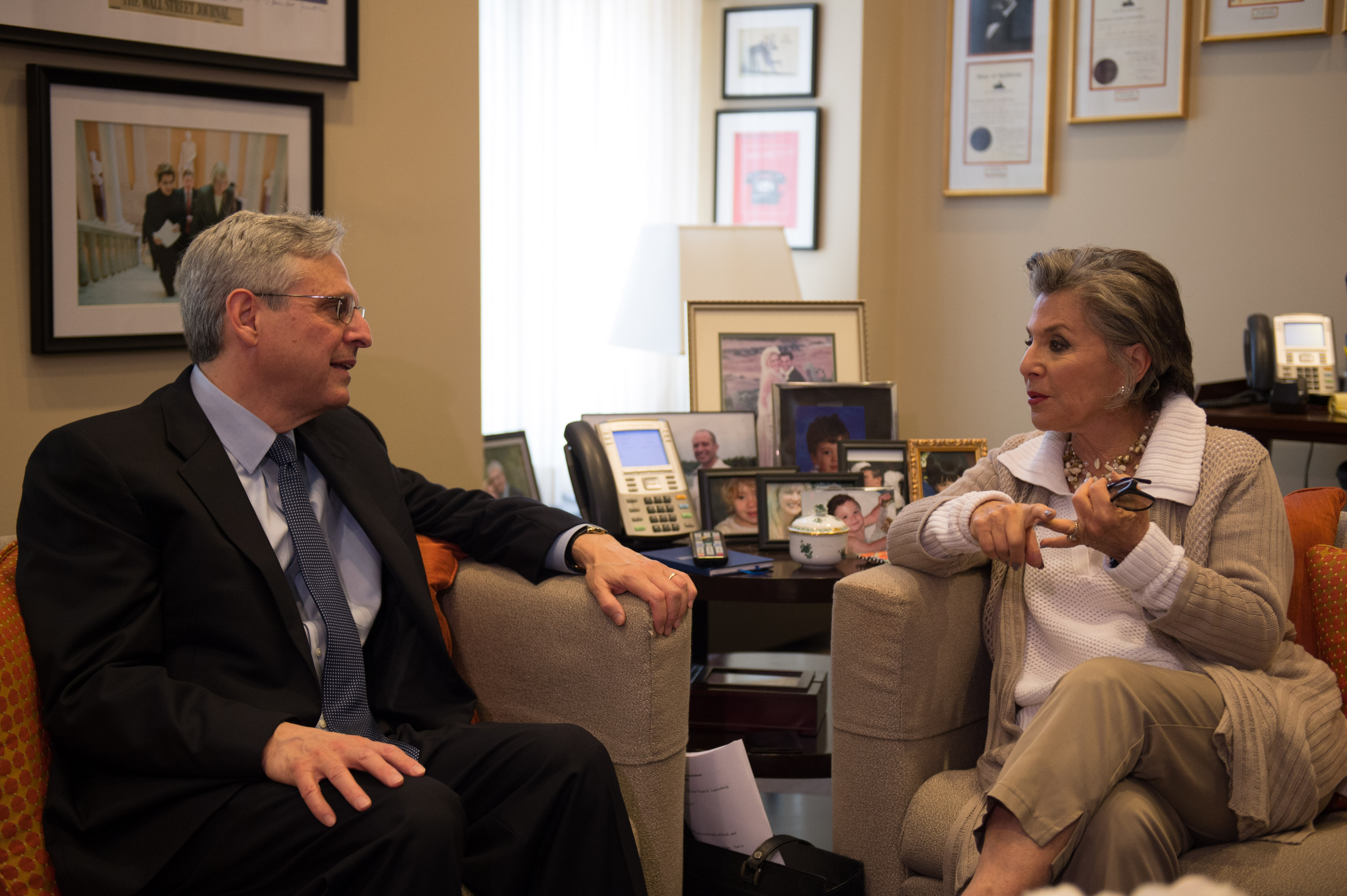
Garland speaks with Democratic U.S. Senator Barbara Boxer.

On March 16, 2016, President Obama nominated Merrick Garland, the chief judge of the United States Court of Appeals for the District of Columbia Circuit, to fill the vacant seat on the Court. In a formal Rose Garden ceremony, Obama, flanked by Garland and Vice President Joe Biden, declared: "I have selected a nominee who is widely recognized not only as one of America's sharpest legal minds, but someone who brings to his work a spirit of decency, modesty, integrity, even-handedness and excellence. Presidents do not stop working in the final year of their term; neither should a Senator." He went on to say: "To suggest that someone as qualified and respected as Merrick Garland does not even deserve a hearing, let alone an up-or-down vote, to join an institution as important as our Supreme Court, when two-thirds of Americans believe otherwise—that would be unprecedented." Garland then briefly spoke, stating that "fidelity to the Constitution and the law have been the cornerstone of my professional life" and promising to "continue on that course" if confirmed for the Supreme Court.

The White House simultaneously released a biographical video of Garland, featuring old photographs of Garland and his family, an interview with the judge, and archival footage of him at the scene of the Oklahoma City bombing, which Garland investigated. In the video, Garland states: "When I am standing with the President and he announces my nomination, I actually think it is going to feel a little bit like it is an out-of-body experience."

The selection of the 63 year old Garland, the oldest Supreme Court nominee since Lewis F. Powell Jr. in 1971 at age 64, caught political analysts by surprise.

== Response to the nomination ==
Immediately following the president's announcement of Garland, Senate Majority Leader, Mitch McConnell, announced a firm refusal to consider nominees to the Supreme Court until the next presidential inauguration. Citing what he called "the Thurmond Rule", McConnell argued that there should not be a nomination so close to the next presidential and congressional election, but rather that the nomination should await the outcome of that election (which was 8 months away, and 10 months to the next presidential and congressional inaugurations):

"The next justice could fundamentally alter the direction of the Supreme Court and have a profound impact on our country, so of course the American people should have a say in the Court’s direction…The American people may well elect a President who decides to nominate Judge Garland for Senate consideration. The next President may also nominate someone very different. Either way, our view is this: Give the people a voice in the filling of this vacancy.’

...declaring:

"The Senate will appropriately revisit the matter when it considers the qualifications of the nominee the next President nominates, whoever that might be."

Senator Orrin Hatch said: "I think well of Merrick Garland. I think he is a fine person. But his nomination does not in any way change current circumstances." Soon thereafter, Senator Jeff Flake said that Garland should not be confirmed unless Hillary Clinton wins the November presidential election. He argued that should Clinton win, Garland should be confirmed in the Senate's lame-duck session because he is less liberal than any nominee Clinton might put forward. After meeting with Garland in April, Flake reiterated this position. Hatch echoed this sentiment, saying that he was "open to resolving this [Garland's nomination after a Clinton win] in a lame-duck [session in December]."

By the beginning of April however, a total of 29 Republicans had announced that even after election, regardless of its outcome, they would not consider the Garland nomination. In April, two Republican senators, Jerry Moran and Lisa Murkowski, after weeks earlier expressing support for proceeding with hearings as a part of the nomination process, had reversed their positions, saying that they now opposed hearings on Garland's nomination. Two other Republicans, Mark Kirk and Susan Collins, expressed their support for hearings and an up-or-down vote on Garland, with Collins also supporting Garland's nomination. Some Republicans, including Ted Cruz and John McCain, suggested that the Senate might not confirm any nominee to replace Scalia, particularly if Democrats retain control of the presidency.

Donald Trump, a candidate in the 2016 Republican Party presidential primaries at the time of Scalia's death, declared his opposition to the Garland nomination when it was announced, maintaining that picking a successor to Scalia should be done by the next president. Trump later released two lists of potential Supreme Court nominees which he would use to guide his Supreme Court nominations if elected president.

In April 2016, a letter signed by sixty-eight of Garland's former law clerks urging his confirmation was delivered to Senate leaders. The Washington Post summarized the letter as painting "a familiar portrait of Garland as a careful judge, a hardworking public servant and a devoted family man." The former clerks wrote: "There are not many bosses who so uniformly inspire the loyalty that we all feel toward Chief Judge Garland. Our enthusiasm is both a testament to his character and a reflection of his commitment to mentoring and encouraging us long after we left his chambers."

On May 2, eight former solicitors general of the United States endorsed Garland as "superbly qualified", including Republicans Paul Clement, Gregory G. Garre, Theodore Olson, and Ken Starr. On June 21, the American Bar Association's Standing Committee on the Federal Judiciary granted Garland its "well-qualified" rating. Commenting on his integrity, the ABA noted: "Most remarkably, in interviews with hundreds of individuals in the legal profession and community who knew Judge Garland, whether for a few years or decades, not one person uttered a negative word about him."

In August 2016, Steve Michel, a New Mexico lawyer, filed a lawsuit in federal court seeking to compel Republican leaders in the Senate to take a vote on the nomination. On November 17, U.S. District Judge Rudolph Contreras dismissed the lawsuit, finding that the plaintiff, who had simply alleged he was a voter, had no standing to sue.

Over 150,000 people signed a "We the People" petition posted in November 2016 on the White House website asking President Obama to independently appoint Garland to the Supreme Court, espousing the theory that the Senate had waived its advise and consent role. The petition received an official White House response, but the administration did not embrace the petitioners' point of view.

== Expiration of the nomination ==
Under long-standing Senate rules, nominations still pending when the Senate adjourns at the end of a session are returned to the president (unless the Senate, by unanimous consent, waives the rule). Garland's nomination expired on January 3, 2017, at the end of the 114th Congress, after languishing 293 days. Garland's nomination was the 15th nomination to the Supreme Court to lapse at the end of a session of Congress.

Barack Obama was succeeded by Donald Trump on January 20, 2017. Shortly afterward, President Trump nominated Neil Gorsuch to fill the Scalia vacancy. Gorsuch was confirmed by the Senate on April 7, 2017.

Two years later, in May 2019, Senator McConnell was asked what he would do if a Supreme Court justice were to die in 2020, an election year. He stated that the Senate would fill such a vacancy. McConnell repeated the statement in September 2020, following the death of associate justice Ruth Bader Ginsburg, citing a 2018 midterm elections mandate "to work with President Trump and support his agenda, particularly his outstanding appointments to the federal judiciary."

On September 26, 2020, Trump announced that he would nominate Amy Coney Barrett as Ginsburg's successor. Though many Democrats and some commentators contended that Republicans violated the precedent they had established for Garland, her appointment to the court was confirmed by Senate on October 26, eight days before the 2020 presidential election.

On January 21, 2021, Trump's newly inaugurated successor Joe Biden announced Garland's nomination to the post of US Attorney General, and after approval by the US Senate by a vote of 70–30, Garland was sworn into office on March 11.

== Effect of vacancy on rulings ==
Scalia's death left the court with eight judges for a majority of its 2015 term and the beginning of its 2016 term, and the vacancy was the second-longest since 1900. With the vacancy persisting for some time, the Court showed a reluctance to accept new cases. The Court's slow pace in accepting new cases reflected "an increased cautiousness considering the real possibility of 4–4 deadlocks on anything ideologically divisive". From the time of Scalia's death in late February 2016 until the first week of April 2017, the Court accepted only three cases, none likely to be controversial. By contrast, over the previous five years the Court took up an average of eight cases over the same period.

For cases that were not decided before his death, Justice Scalia's votes were not counted, with the cases decided by the remaining eight members of the Court. When the Court issues any ruling with votes split 4–4, the Court does not publish a written opinion with respect to the merits of the case and the ruling of the lower court is affirmed, although the Court's affirmance has no effect as precedent in future cases.

Citing the Court's practices following the death of Justice Robert H. Jackson in 1954, Tom Goldstein of SCOTUSblog suggested in February 2016 that the Court was more likely to set evenly-divided cases for reargument after a new justice is appointed to the Court. However, the Court split 4–4 in at least five cases of the 2015 term:

- Friedrichs v. California Teachers Association, an important case on the funding of public-sector labor unions;
- Hawkins v. Community Bank of Raymore, a case on the application of gender discrimination laws to loan guarantors;
- Franchise Tax Board of California v. Hyatt, in which the Court deadlocked on the question of whether Nevada v. Hall should be overruled;
- Dollar General Corp. v. Mississippi Band of Choctaw Indians, a case involving the jurisdiction of tribal courts;
- United States v. Texas, a highly watched case in which the Court split 4–4 on the constitutionality of the Deferred Action for Parents of Americans (DAPA) program.

== See also ==
- Barack Obama Supreme Court candidates
- List of nominations to the Supreme Court of the United States
- Unsuccessful nominations to the Supreme Court of the United States
