= List of United States Supreme Court cases, volume 588 =

This is a list of all the United States Supreme Court cases from volume 588 of the United States Reports:

Case name	Docket no.	Date decided
PDR Network, LLC v. Carlton Harris Chiropractic, Inc.	588 U.S. 1	June 20, 2019
The extent to which the 2006 FCC order defining "unsolicited advertisement" binds the lower courts may depend on the resolution of two preliminary sets of questions that were not aired before the Court of Appeals.
Am. Legion v. Am. Humanist Ass'n	588 U.S. 29	June 20, 2019
Though a symbol of Christianity, the cross on public land does not violate the establishment clause of the First Amendment due to its historical value as a war memorial that has stood for nearly 100 years.
McDonough v. Smith	588 U.S. 109	June 20, 2019
The statute of limitations for a §1983 fabricated-evidence claim began to run when the criminal proceedings end in the §1983 plaintiff's favor.
Gundy v. United States	588 U.S. 109	June 20, 2019
SORNA's delegation of authority to the Attorney General does not violate the nondelegation doctrine. Judgement of the Second Circuit affirmed.
Knick v. Twp. of Scott	588 U.S. 180	June 21, 2019
A government violates the Takings Clause when it takes property without compensation, and a property owner may then bring a Fifth Amendment claim under 42 U.S.C. § 1983; the state-litigation requirement of Williamson County Regional Planning Commission v. Hamilton Bank of Johnson City, is overruled.
Rehaif v. United States	588 U.S. 225	June 21, 2019
In a prosecution under 18 USC § 922(g) and § 924(a)(2), the Government must prove both that the defendant knew he possessed a firearm and that he knew he belonged to the relevant category of persons barred from possessing a firearm.
N.C. Dept. of Revenue v. Kimberley Rice Kaestner 1992 Family Trust	588 U.S. 262	June 21, 2019
The presence of in-state beneficiaries alone does not empower a state to tax trust income that has not been distributed to the beneficiaries where the beneficiaries have no right to demand that income and are uncertain to receive it.
Flowers v. Mississippi	588 U.S. 284	June 21, 2019
The trial court clearly erred when it concluded that the state's peremptory strike of a particular Black prospective juror was not substantially motivated by discriminatory intent.
Dutra Group v. Batterton	588 U.S. 358	June 24, 2019
A plaintiff may not recover punitive damages on a maritime claim of unseaworthiness.
Iancu v. Brunetti	588 U.S. 388	June 24, 2019
The Lanham Act prohibition on the registration of "immoral" or "scandalous" trademarks infringes the First Amendment.
Food Marketing Inst. v. Argus Leader Media	588 U.S. 427	June 24, 2019
Where commercial or financial information is both customarily and actually treated as private by its owner and provided to the government under an assurance of privacy, the information is "confidential" within the meaning of the Freedom of Information Act.
United States v. Davis	588 U.S. 445	June 24, 2019
A statute authorizing enhanced penalties for using a firearm during the commission of a "crime of violence" is unconstitutionally vague.
Tenn. Wine & Spirits Retailers Ass'n v. Thomas	588 U.S. 504	June 26, 2019
Tennessee's two-year durational-residency requirement applicable to retail liquor store license applicants violates the Commerce Clause and is not authorized by the Twenty-first Amendment
Kisor v. Wilkie	588 U.S. 558	June 26, 2019
There is no sufficient cause to overturn Auer v. Robbins or Bowles v. Seminole Rock & Sand Co., but a court must use all interpretive powers it has to affirm if the Auer deference is appropriate.
United States v. Haymond	588 U.S. 634	June 26, 2019
The U.S. Court of Appeals for the 10th Circuit's judgment – that 18 U.S.C. § 3583(k)'s last two sentences are unconstitutional and unenforceable – is vacated, and the case is remanded.[1]
Rucho v. Common Cause	588 U.S. 684	June 27, 2019
Partisan gerrymandering claims present political questions beyond the reach of the federal courts.
Dept. of Com. v. New York	588 U.S. 752	June 27, 2019
The Secretary of Commerce did not violate either the Enumeration Clause under the Constitution of the United States or the Census Act of 1790 by opting to reinstate a question on a person's status of citizenship to the 2020 census questionnaire, but the United States District Court for the Southern District of New York was warranted to remand the case from the judiciary to the bureaucratic agency where the evidence does not tell the same story as that of the Secretary of Commerce. Questioning the status of one's citizenship in the federal census is a reviewable action under the Administrative Procedures Act.
Mitchell v. Wisconsin	588 U.S. 840	June 27, 2019
When a driver is unconscious and cannot be given a breath test, the exigent-circumstances doctrine generally permits a blood test without a warrant.

== See also ==
- List of United States Supreme Court cases by the Roberts Court
- 2018 term opinions of the Supreme Court of the United States
