= Franchise Tax Board of California v. Hyatt (2003) =

- Supreme Court of the United States

Argued February 24, 2003 Decided April 23, 2003
- Full case name: Franchise Tax Board of California v. Hyatt et al.
- Docket no.: 02-42
- Citations: 538 U.S. 488 (more) 123 S. Ct. 1683; 155 L. Ed. 2d 702

Holding
- The Full Faith and Credit Clause does not require Nevada state courts to give full faith and credit to California statues that immunize its tax agencies from suit. Judgement of the Nevada Supreme Court affirmed.

Court membership
- Chief Justice William Rehnquist Associate Justices John P. Stevens · Sandra Day O'Connor; Antonin Scalia · Anthony Kennedy; David Souter · Clarence Thomas; Ruth Bader Ginsburg · Stephen Breyer

Case opinion
- Majority: O'Connor, joined by unanimous court

Franchise Tax Board of California v. Hyatt (short: Hyatt I), 538 U.S. 488 (2003), was a United States Supreme Court case in which the Court unanimously held that the Full Faith and Credit Clause does not require Nevada state courts to give full faith and credit to California statutes that immunize its tax agencies from suit. It was followed by Hyatt II in 2016 and Hyatt III in 2019, ultimately overturning precedent set by the 1979 Supreme Court case, Nevada v. Hall.
