= United States v. Haymond =

- Supreme Court of the United States

Argued February 26, 2019 Decided June 26, 2019
- Full case name: United States, Petitioner v. Andre Ralph Haymond
- Docket no.: 17-1672
- Citations: 588 U.S. ___ (more) 139 S. Ct. 2369; 204 L. Ed. 2d 897

Case history
- Prior: No. 08-CR-201, 2016 WL 4094886 (N.D. Okla. Aug. 2, 2016); affirmed, 869 F.3d 1153 (10th Cir. 2017); cert. granted, 139 S. Ct. 398 (2018).
- Subsequent: Appeal dismissed on remand, 935 F.3d 1059 (10th Cir. 2019).

Holding
- The U.S. Court of Appeals for the 10th Circuit's judgment – that 18 U.S.C. § 3583(k)'s last two sentences are unconstitutional and unenforceable – is vacated, and the case is remanded.

Court membership
- Chief Justice John Roberts Associate Justices Clarence Thomas · Ruth Bader Ginsburg; Stephen Breyer · Samuel Alito; Sonia Sotomayor · Elena Kagan; Neil Gorsuch · Brett Kavanaugh

Case opinions
- Plurality: Gorsuch, joined by Ginsburg, Sotomayor, Kagan
- Concurrence: Breyer (in judgment)
- Dissent: Alito, joined by Roberts, Thomas, Kavanaugh

Laws applied
- U.S. Const. amend. VI

United States v. Haymond, 588 U.S. ___ (2019), is a case in which the U.S. Supreme Court struck down the five-year mandatory minimum prison sentence for certain sex offenses committed by federal supervised releases under 18 U.S.C. § 3583(k) as unconstitutional unless the charges are proven to a jury beyond a reasonable doubt. Justices Ginsburg, Sotomayor, and Kagan joined Gorsuch's plurality opinion, while Breyer provided the necessary fifth vote with his narrow concurrence that began by saying he agreed with much of Justice Alito's dissent, which was joined by Justices Roberts, Thomas, and Kavanaugh.

The Court was considering whether Congress can require mandatory minimum prison sentences that exceed the minimum for the original offense, and allow maximum prison sentences that exceed the maximum for the original offense, in federal supervised release revocation cases where the facts were not proven to a jury beyond a reasonable doubt. The supervised release statute requires only that there be a judge's finding by a preponderance of the evidence that a violation of federal supervised release has occurred.

The U.S. Court of Appeals for the 10th Circuit, relying heavily on United States v. Booker, excised the offending provision, which had been introduced in the Adam Walsh Child Protection and Safety Act of 2006, and whose required application in this case the sentencing judge had found "repugnant."

Justice Samuel Alito noted in oral argument that this case has the potential to bring down the entire system of federal supervised release. According to a Congressional Research Service report, "The Supreme Court's ultimate decision in Haymond could have significant implications going forward for the over 16,000 federal inmates currently incarcerated and the nearly 9,000 former federal inmates currently serving terms of supervised release for sex offenses, as well as for how Congress crafts laws concerning supervised release."

== Background ==
On 21 January 2010, Andre Ralph Haymond was convicted of possession of child pornography and sentenced to 38 months imprisonment and 10 years of supervised release. Haymond's supervised release began on April 24, 2013. Two and a half years after Haymond's supervised release, a surprise search by probation officers of his apartment was conducted, resulting in the seizure of Haymond's phone, his supervised release was revoked for knowing possession of thirteen images of child pornography in his phone's gallery cache, among other violations.

If it had been an ordinary violation, Haymond's original conviction for a Class C felony would have permitted a term of reimprisonment between zero and two years, pursuant to 18 U.S.C. § 3583(e)(3). He was instead sentenced to five years in prison because the violation involving possession of child pornography triggered a five-year mandatory minimum. The judge noted that had it not been for the mandatory minimum, he "probably would have sentenced in the range of two years or less". With regard to the sufficiency of the evidence, the district court stated, "If this were a criminal trial and the Court were the jury, the United States would have lost" and the appellate court noted, "This is a close case, even under a preponderance of the evidence standard".

=== Relevant statute ===
(k) Notwithstanding subsection (b), the authorized term of supervised release for any offense under section 1201 involving a minor victim, and for any offense under section 1591, 1594(c), 2241, 2242, 2243, 2244, 2245, 2250, 2251, 2251A, 2252, 2252A, 2260, 2421, 2422, 2423, or 2425, is any term of years not less than 5, or life. If a defendant required to register under the Sex Offender Registration and Notification Act commits any criminal offense under chapter 109A, 110, or 117, or section 1201 or 1591, for which imprisonment for a term longer than 1 year can be imposed, the court shall revoke the term of supervised release and require the defendant to serve a term of imprisonment under subsection (e)(3) without regard to the exception contained therein. Such term shall be not less than 5 years.

== Arguments ==
According to the government, the statute's prison requirement is similar to what happens after revocation of parole and probation, in which the defendant has received a benefit that is being taken away due to a violation. Also, the government argues that the jury trial right in the Sixth Amendment to the United States Constitution does not apply to proceedings that begin long after criminal prosecution has ended and concern sentence-implementation facts that did not exist when the criminal prosecution occurred.

In oral argument, Justice Sonia Sotomayor expressed due process and jury rights concerns under the Fifth and Sixth Amendments, respectively, noting that both were implicated in the Apprendi v. New Jersey line of cases, including Alleyne v. United States, which requires facts to be proven to a jury beyond a reasonable doubt if they constitute elements of the offense, i.e. if they change the sentencing range by altering the statutory minimum or maximum sentences.

Sotomayor raised the distinction between federal parole and federal supervised release, and the government noted that one way in which supervised release is different "is that there is a way under the supervised release statute for the term of reimprisonment to exceed even the period of conditional liberty that's represented by the supervised release itself." Justice Elena Kagan asked, "Isn't that the difference between parole cases, is that you can never get into this problem of -- of serving longer than the original authorized sentence?" to which the government responded that "we don't actually have a reimprisonment term here that is longer than the original sentence because the original term of supervised release was 10 years and his reimprisonment is for five." The defense argued that "it doesn't matter. What does matter is that he was looking at a maximum sentence of life without parole. And the Court's cases in Frank, Duncan and Blanton versus City of Las Vegas all point out to the fact that, when you consider the right to jury trial, you look at what the maximum prison sentence could be."

The government said that the case of Morrissey v. Brewer, in which the court held that a jury finding beyond a reasonable doubt is not required for parole revocation, was precisely analogous. The government also brought up the case of Gagnon v. Scarpelli, applying similar principles to probation revocation proceedings. The government noted that "this Court has considered things like revocation of good time credits to be the denial of a right and, nevertheless, not attached full protections to them. And it's considered the revocation of conditional liberty to implicate a defendant's liberty rights in the parole context and, nevertheless, not attached full due process, let alone Sixth Amendment, protections."

=== Proposed remedies ===
One proposed remedy was for the court to require the convening of juries for revocation hearings. According to the defense, it would be better for Congress to devise a remedy, since "You would have burden of proof issues, you'd have confrontation issues, you'd have potential double jeopardy issues that would arise. There would be potential self-incrimination issues. You'd be dealing with whether there needs to be something presented to the grand jury in the first place." He also argued that mandatory minimums and potential life sentences for violations would transform revocations, "a situation that has always been highly discretionary and . . . focused on the individual defendant and what he needs" into an adversarial system.
