= Knick v. Township of Scott =

- Supreme Court of the United States

Argued October 3, 2018 Reargued January 16, 2019 Decided June 21, 2019
- Full case name: Rose Mary Knick v. Township of Scott, Pennsylvania, et al.
- Docket no.: 17-647
- Citations: 588 U.S. (more) 139 S. Ct. 2162; 204 L. Ed. 2d 558

Case history
- Prior: Motion to dismiss granted, No. 3:14-CV-02223, 2016 WL 4701549 (M.D. Pa. Sept. 07, 2016); affirmed, 862 F.3d 310 (3d Cir. 2017); cert. granted, 138 S. Ct. 1262 (2018).

Holding
- A government violates the Takings Clause when it takes property without compensation, and a property owner may then bring a Fifth Amendment claim under 42 U.S.C. § 1983; the state-litigation requirement of Williamson County Regional Planning Commission v. Hamilton Bank of Johnson City, is overruled.

Court membership
- Chief Justice John Roberts Associate Justices Clarence Thomas · Ruth Bader Ginsburg; Stephen Breyer · Samuel Alito; Sonia Sotomayor · Elena Kagan; Neil Gorsuch · Brett Kavanaugh

Case opinions
- Majority: Roberts, joined by Thomas, Alito, Gorsuch, Kavanaugh
- Concurrence: Thomas
- Dissent: Kagan, joined by Ginsburg, Breyer, Sotomayor

Laws applied
- U.S. Const. amend. V
- This case overturned a previous ruling or rulings
- Williamson County Regional Planning Commission v. Hamilton Bank of Johnson City (1985) (in part)

Knick v. Township of Scott, 588 U.S. 180 (2019), was a case before the Supreme Court of the United States dealing with compensation for private property owners when the use of that property is taken from them by state or local governments, under the Due Process Clause and the Takings Clause of the Fifth Amendment to the United States Constitution. The immediate question asks if private land owners must exhaust all state-offered venues for mediation before seeking action in the federal courts. The case specifically addresses the Court's prior decision from the 1985 case Williamson County Regional Planning Commission v. Hamilton Bank of Johnson City, which had previously established that all state court venues must be exhausted first, but which has since resulted in several split decisions among circuit courts. The Supreme Court ruled in June 2019 to overturn part of Williamson County that required state venue action be taken first, allowing taking-compensation cases to be brought directly to federal court.

== Background ==
The Takings Clause of the Fifth Amendment allows federal, state, and local governments to take private property for public use under eminent domain, as long as the private landowners are justly compensated for the taking of their property.

In 1985, in Williamson County Regional Planning Commission v. Hamilton Bank of Johnson City, the Supreme Court held that in cases claiming just compensation for private property taken by state or local governments, the owner had to demonstrate that the case was ripe for litigation by exhausting state law remedies "first." As it turned out, however, courts also took the position that when property owners complied with this rule and sued "first" in state court, the state court decision would give rise to res judicata or issue preclusion, so the owner's claim of federal constitutional violation could never be heard in federal court under federal law. This decision had come under criticism as it denied property owners, and them alone, access to federal courts and to protection of the Fifth Amendment's Taking Clause.

In the Knick case, Rose Mary Knick of Pennsylvania had purchased 90 acres (36 ha) of farmland within Scott Township, Lackawanna County in 1970. Around 2008, another resident of the township discovered documentation that suggested one of their relatives may have been buried in a cemetery within Knick's land. In 2008, a dispute arose between Knick, and the township which promulgated public access to the alleged cemetery located on Knick's property. Knick asserted there was no evidence of such, her land title did not include any mention of a cemetery, nor was any cemetery registered with the state. The Township passed an ordinance in 2012 that required any cemetery operated within the Township to have right-of-way access from the nearest public road, and be open to public during daylight hours. After passing the ordinance, a Township official went onto Knick's property without permission, discovered a set of stones he deemed to be a cemetery, and determined Knick to be in violation of the ordinance. Knick eventually sued in federal court which dismissed her action.

Knick sought relief from the Pennsylvania court of common pleas, arguing that her land was being taken for public use without compensation, but the court refused to accept the case as the Township dropped a civil enforcement action against her. Because the ordinance and its threat of enforcement remained in place, Ms. Knick subsequently brought a lawsuit before the United States District Court for the Middle District of Pennsylvania, citing facial challenges based on the Township's new ordinance violating her Fourth and Fifth Amendment rights in addition to takings claims. By September 2016, the District Court dismissed the case, arguing that it was unripe for federal courts as per Williamson County. Knick appealed to the Third Circuit Appeals Court. Knick was represented on appeal by the nonprofit public interest law firm Pacific Legal Foundation which specializes in property rights cases. The Third Circuit considered if the various tests prescribed by Williamson County were applicable to the facial challenges presented by Knick and ultimately deemed that Knick's case was unripe until Knick had prosecuted a state-level lawsuit.

== Supreme Court ==
Knick petitioned the Supreme Court for writ of certiorari. Knick's petition pointed out that there was a split in how Williamson County was applied in the Circuit Courts. The Third Circuit's decision agreed with the Sixth, Ninth, and Tenth Circuits in prior case law, but was in conflict with the First, Fourth, and Seventh Circuits. Additionally, the petition referred to Justice John Roberts' denial for writ of certiorari in Arrigoni Enterprises, LLC v. Durham (2016), a case that also sought to challenge the Williamson County decision, which had been joined by Justice Anthony Kennedy. In the denial, Roberts suggested that it was necessary for the Supreme Court to review Williamson County, due to the onus it puts on property owners, but required a proper case for that review.

The Court granted the petition in March 2018, with the first oral arguments heard on October 3, 2018, before an eight-member Supreme Court, as Justice Brett Kavanaugh had yet to be sworn into office. In November 2018, the Court announced it would hold a second argument before all nine Justices; while the Court did not provide a rationale, analysts believed that this indicated the eight Justices were deadlocked, thus requiring Justice Kavanaugh to take part in the case to break the deadlock. The second oral hearings before the full court was held January 16, 2019.

The Court issued its judgment on June 21, 2019. In its 5–4 decision along ideological lines, it vacated the Third Circuit's judgment and remanded the case to the lower court. The decision overruled the portion of Williamson County decision that required those seeking legal action for takings-compensation to seek state litigation first, finding that the original decision was poorly reasoned. Chief Justice John Roberts wrote the majority opinion, writing that "A property owner has an actionable Fifth Amendment takings claim when the government takes his property without paying for it." The opinion emphasized that when private land is taken there is a constitutional violation, and the case is ripe for litigation in the federal court system. Justice Clarence Thomas joined the majority, and in a separate opinion, wrote "Stare decisis does not compel continued adherence to this erroneous precedent." Justice Elena Kagan wrote the dissent and expressed concerns that by eliminating the need to bring such takings-compensation cases to state courts first, it could require federal courts to become involved in understanding complex state law issues. Kagan's decision also expressed concern that Knick along with other recent Court decisions such as Franchise Tax Board of California v. Hyatt shows a trend that the current Court is ready to ignore long-standing precedent and overturn past rulings. Justice Stephen Breyer had expressed similar concern in his dissent with Hyatt.

== See also ==
- Janus v. AFSCME (2018), a case in which the liberal minority of the Supreme Court questioned the willingness of the conservative majority of the Supreme Court to ignore long-standing precedent and to overturn past rulings/to overrule precedent.
- Franchise Tax Board of California v. Hyatt (2019), another case in which the liberal minority of the Supreme Court questioned the willingness of the conservative majority of the Supreme Court to ignore long-standing precedent and to overturn past rulings/to overrule precedents.
