= North Carolina Department of Revenue v. Kimberley Rice Kaestner 1992 Family Trust =

- Supreme Court of the United States

Decided June 21, 2019
- Full case name: North Carolina Department of Revenue v. Kimberley Rice Kaestner 1992 Family Trust
- Docket no.: 18-457
- Citations: 588 U.S. 262 (more)

Holding
- The presence of in-state beneficiaries alone does not empower a state to tax trust income that has not been distributed to the beneficiaries where the beneficiaries have no right to demand that income and are uncertain to receive it.

Court membership
- Chief Justice John Roberts Associate Justices Clarence Thomas · Ruth Bader Ginsburg; Stephen Breyer · Samuel Alito; Sonia Sotomayor · Elena Kagan; Neil Gorsuch · Brett Kavanaugh

Case opinion
- Majority: Sotomayor, joined by unanimous

North Carolina Department of Revenue v. Kimberley Rice Kaestner 1992 Family Trust, 588 U.S. 262 (2019), was a United States Supreme Court case in which the Court held that the presence of in-state beneficiaries alone does not empower a state to tax trust income that has not been distributed to the beneficiaries where the beneficiaries have no right to demand that income and are uncertain to receive it.
