= Williamson County Regional Planning Commission v. Hamilton Bank of Johnson City =

- Supreme Court of the United States

Argued February 19, 1985 Decided June 28, 1985
- Full case name: Williamson County Regional Planning Commission, et al. v. Hamilton Bank of Johnson City
- Citations: 473 U.S. 172 (more) 105 S. Ct. 3108; 87 L. Ed. 2d 126; 1985 U.S. LEXIS 87

Case history
- Prior: 729 F.2d 402 (6th Cir. 1984); cert. granted, 469 U.S. 815 (1984).

Holding
- Claim that agency's land-use regulations violated the Just Compensation and Due Process Clauses was not ripe for adjudication.

Court membership
- Chief Justice Warren E. Burger Associate Justices William J. Brennan Jr. · Byron White; Thurgood Marshall · Harry Blackmun; Lewis F. Powell Jr. · William Rehnquist; John P. Stevens · Sandra Day O'Connor

Case opinions
- Majority: Blackmun, joined by Burger, Brennan, Marshall, Rehnquist, Stevens, O'Connor
- Concurrence: Brennan, joined by Marshall
- Concurrence: Stevens
- Dissent: White
- Powell took no part in the consideration or decision of the case.

Laws applied
- U.S. Const. amends. V, XIV
- Overruled by
- Knick v. Township of Scott, Pennsylvania (2019) (in part)

Williamson County Regional Planning Commission v. Hamilton Bank of Johnson City, 473 U.S. 172 (1985), is a U.S. Supreme Court case that limited access to federal court for plaintiffs alleging uncompensated takings of private property under the Fifth Amendment. In June 2019, this case was overruled in part by the Court's decision in Knick v. Township of Scott, Pennsylvania.

== Facts of the case ==
In 1973, the Williamson County (Tennessee) Regional Planning Commission approved a preliminary plat for a 676-acre (2.74 km^{2}) residential subdivision, including a golf course, open space, and 736 residential units. Four years later, after the developer had incurred substantial costs installing infrastructure and had received final approval for the construction of the first 212 units, the county changed its zoning ordinance and adopted more stringent density limits.

Upon submission of a revised preliminary plat in 1980, the Commission raised eight objections to the development based on non-compliance with the county's then-existing zoning and development regulations. Following an administrative appeal, the County Board of Zoning Appeals ruled that the Commission should have applied the regulations and zoning that were in effect in 1973, when the original preliminary plat was filed. However, the Commission declined to follow this directive, and once again disapproved the revised plat.

Hamilton Bank, which had acquired the undeveloped property through foreclosure, filed suit in federal court, alleging that the Commission's actions amounted to a regulatory taking of its property without just compensation. Alternatively, Hamilton argued that the Agency's actions violated the Due Process Clause of the 14th Amendment and should be set aside.

== Prior history ==
After trial, a jury found that the Commission's regulations violated the Just Compensation Clause of the Fifth Amendment, and awarded Hamilton $350,000 in compensation. The District Court issued an injunction requiring the Commission to apply its 1973 regulations to Hamilton's development plat, but set aside award of compensation on the grounds that Hamilton's loss of the beneficial use of the property had been only temporary. The Sixth Circuit Court of Appeals reversed and reinstated the jury's award, holding that just compensation was mandated by the Fifth Amendment when land-use regulations deprive an owner of all economically viable use of property, for the period during which they are in effect.

The Supreme Court granted certiorari to determine whether monetary compensation is required when an owner is temporarily deprived of the beneficial use of land by operation of government regulations, but it did not resolve that issue.

== Decision of the Court ==
Justice Blackmun, writing for the Court, held that Hamilton Bank's takings claim was not ripe for adjudication. The Court set out two independent requirements plaintiffs must meet before bringing a Fifth Amendment takings case in federal court.

First, the government entity charged with a taking must have reached "a final decision regarding the application of the regulations to the property at issue." Here, neither the developer nor the bank had applied for variances that might have resolved five of the Commission's eight objections to the project. Liability for just compensation under the Fifth Amendment depends on a fact-intensive inquiry into the economic impact of regulations and their effect on the owner's investment-backed expectations, but those issues cannot be determined until the defendant agency "has arrived at a final, definitive position regarding how it will apply the regulations at issue to the particular land in question."

Second, before asserting a violation of the Just Compensation Clause in federal court, the plaintiff must attempt to obtain compensation through whatever procedures the state has provided for doing so. The Court stated that here, Tennessee law provides for an inverse condemnation action to seek compensation from the state for a taking of property. Since this qualifies as a "'reasonable, certain and adequate provision for obtaining compensation," Hamilton Bank could not allege a violation of the Just Compensation Clause until it had sought to use this procedure and compensation had been denied.

As for the Bank's Due Process claim, the Court held that since liability for a due process violation would require a finding that the Agency's regulations had the same effect as an outright appropriation of the Bank's property, the effect of the regulations could not be determined because of the lack of a final determination (see above), the due process claim was also found to be unripe.

=== Concurring opinions ===
Justice Brennan filed a concurring opinion, joined by Justice Marshall, reiterating his dissent in San Diego Gas & Electric Co. v. City of San Diego (1981), in which he presciently argued that the Fifth Amendment requires compensation for temporary regulatory takings.

Justice Stevens wrote a concurring opinion, arguing that the judgment below should be reversed because there was no violation of due process and no formal condemnation of the property.

=== Dissenting opinions ===
Justice White dissented from the holding that the takings issue was not ripe for adjudication, without further comment.

== Critical response ==
Williamson County's "state procedures" ripeness requirement has proven to be highly controversial. It has been complained that the Court decided this question without adequate briefing, the requirement of pursuing compensation from the state is not logically inherent in the text of the Fifth Amendment, the rule derives from procedural due process considerations that are inapplicable to takings claims, and that principles of res judicata and collateral estoppel may bar a plaintiff's claim from federal court after complying with Williamson County's procedures to "ripen" the claim. The latter problem became known as the "Williamson Trap" among attorneys for aggrieved property owners, although it was defended as a straightforward application of principles of preclusion by government advocates. However, in an earlier landmark takings case, Euclid v. Ambler (1926), the Court held it unnecessary to seek a local permit before challenging a land-use regulation as unconstitutional.

== Subsequent history ==
In San Remo Hotel v. City and County of San Francisco (2005), the Court held that the Full Faith and Credit Statute bars relitigating a Fifth Amendment takings claim in federal court, after just compensation has been denied in state court proceedings. This seemed to bear out the views of commentators who saw Williamson County's second prong as extinguishing federal takings claims, rather than ripening them. Writing for a four-justice concurrence, Chief Justice Rehnquist noted that the impact of the Court's holding could preclude aggrieved property owners from having their federal takings claim considered by any court, and called for the Court to reconsider Williamson County's state procedures requirement "in an appropriate case."

More recently, the Tennessee Supreme Court noted in a 2010 decision that Tennessee state courts have never held that Article 21 of the Tennessee Constitution requires regulatory takings claims to be compensated in Tennessee state courts; however, the court decided the case on other grounds.

On March 5, 2018, the Court agreed to hear Knick v. Township of Scott, Pennsylvania, which allowed the court to reassess the judicial merits of Williamson County. In their decision issued on June 21, 2019, the Court overturned part of Williamson County related to exhausting state court actions before bringing such action to federal courts.

== See also ==
- Inverse condemnation
- Ripeness
- Regulatory taking
- List of United States Supreme Court cases, volume 473
