= Franchise Tax Board of California v. Hyatt =

Franchise Tax Bd. of Cal. v. Hyatt
- Supreme Court of the United States

Argued January 9, 2019 Decided May 13, 2019
- Full case name: Franchise Tax Board of California, Petitioner v. Gilbert P. Hyatt
- Docket no.: 17-1299
- Citations: 587 U.S. 230 (more) 139 S. Ct. 1485; 203 L. Ed. 2d 768
- Argument: Oral argument
- Decision: Opinion

Case history
- Prior: 538 U.S. 488 (2003); 335 P.3d 125 (2014); 578 U.S. 171, 136 S. Ct. 1277 (2016); 407 P. 3d 717 (2017)

Holding
- States have sovereign immunity from private suits against them in courts of other states without their consent. Judgement of the Nevada Supreme Court reversed and remanded.

Court membership
- Chief Justice John Roberts Associate Justices Clarence Thomas · Ruth Bader Ginsburg; Stephen Breyer · Samuel Alito; Sonia Sotomayor · Elena Kagan; Neil Gorsuch · Brett Kavanaugh

Case opinions
- Majority: Thomas, joined by Roberts, Alito, Gorsuch, Kavanaugh
- Dissent: Breyer, joined by Ginsburg, Sotomayor, Kagan

Laws applied
- U.S. Const. Amend. XI
- This case overturned a previous ruling or rulings
- Nevada v. Hall (1979)

Franchise Tax Board of California v. Hyatt (short: Franchise Tax Bd. of Cal. v. Hyatt or Hyatt III), 587 U.S. 230 (2019), was a United States Supreme Court case that determined that unless they consent, states have sovereign immunity from private suits filed against them in the courts of another state. The 5–4 decision overturned precedent set in a 1979 Supreme Court case, Nevada v. Hall. This was the third time that the litigants had presented their case to the Court, as the Court had already ruled on the issue in 2003 and 2016.

The ruling ended a long tax dispute between Gilbert Hyatt and California regarding alleged tax fraud by Hyatt. Hyatt had been challenging the tax fraud penalties that the California Franchise Tax Board (FTB) had ordered him to pay since 1993, both in court and through administrative proceedings. Because of the Supreme Court ruling, Hyatt was required to pay for all legal costs he incurred, without receiving a judgement against the FTB. On this matter, Justice Clarence Thomas wrote: "The consequences for the inventor are that he'll suffer the loss of two decades of litigation expenses and a final judgment against the Board for its egregious conduct. ... Those case-specific costs are not among the reliance interests that would persuade us to adhere to an incorrect resolution of an important constitutional question."

Justice Stephen Breyer, in the dissenting opinion, warned of the willingness of the majority to overrule precedent, saying, "To overrule a sound decision like Hall ... is to cause the public to become increasingly uncertain about which cases the court will overrule and which cases are here to stay", referencing as an example Planned Parenthood v. Casey, a 1992 case that affirmed the landmark abortion rights case Roe v. Wade. As a result of this ruling, Gilbert Hyatt did not receive $100,000 in damages from California. Although he was originally granted $389 million in damages by a Nevada jury, rulings by the Nevada Supreme Court and the U.S. Supreme Court reduced the amount to $100,000.

== Legal background ==
The doctrine of sovereign immunity is the right of a government not to be sued in its own courts. The doctrine stems from the English common law principle of rex non potest peccare, meaning "the King can do no wrong". More recently, the principle has been defended for a variety of reasons: the idea that the entire community, i.e. the state, cannot commit wrongdoing; that the state's actions are lawful per se; that an agent of the state, when acting unlawfully, necessarily does so outside of their legal authority; (Note: Government officers have long been amenable to suit without the government's immunity.) opposition to the use of public funds to compensate private injuries; and that being amenable to suits interferes with the state's operation.

In the United States, sovereign immunity has been part of legal procedures for a long time. Before the enactment of the Constitution, the Confederation government relied on the states' judiciaries for settling disputes and cases with interstate or international consequences. Congress could only appoint courts dealing with piracy, felonies on international waters and appeals in cases of capture. They could also establish ad hoc tribunals for dealing with disputes between two or more states and disputes with individuals claiming certain land based on different grants of two or more states. However, various states had accumulated large debts with domestic and foreign creditors, largely due to the American Revolutionary War. The Confederation government's and some states' failure to pay their creditors was seen as an obstacle to harmony and peace. Some feared that the failure to repay foreign governments and its subjects posed an international threat. In addition, because the domestic creditors were largely concentrated in a few states, people feared that states defaulting on their debt would cause interstate tension. The legacy of these concerns can be recognized in Article Three of the United States Constitution, which extended the judicial power of the United States to cases between a state and foreign nationals or citizens of other states.

Chisholm v. Georgia (1793) became the first case in which the U.S. Supreme Court considered the issue of state sovereignty under the Constitution. In this case, the Court held that Article III § 2 of the Constitution abrogated state sovereign immunity and that thus federal courts were authorized to hear cases between states and private individuals. Therefore, Georgia had no immunity from an action of assumpsit by a South Carolina resident. Subsequently, the Eleventh Amendment was passed, which was designed to supersede the Chisholm decision.

=== Nevada v. Hall ===
The issue of interstate sovereign immunity remained unaddressed by the U.S. Supreme Court until Nevada v. Hall (1979). Prior to Nevada v. Hall, courts had generally ruled that the Constitution, at least implicitly, prevented states from being sued in the courts of other states, pursuant to the principle of sovereign immunity. (Note: For example, Paulus v. South Dakota, 227 N.W. 52 (N.D. 1929) ("Therefore, in the absence of allegations as to the law of the sister state showing a consent to be sued, the courts of this state must necessarily regard a sovereign sister state as immune to the same extent that this state would be immune in the absence of a consenting statute.").) In Nevada v. Hall, the U.S. Supreme Court considered a case where two California residents were severely injured after their car collided with a car that was the property of the State of Nevada on a highway in California. The car was being operated by a University of Nevada employee on official business. The California residents brought suit against the University, the State of Nevada, and the car's administrator in a California Superior Court. The Superior Court rejected Nevada's argument that they were immune from suits against them in sister-state courts without their consent and held that it did have jurisdiction over the case. The Superior Court also rejected Nevada's argument that the Court, in keeping with the Full Faith and Credit Clause, should apply the Nevada statute limiting damages in suits against the state to $25,000 per tort. (Note: In 1979, this was raised to $50,000 per tort.) Instead, the Superior Court awarded the plaintiffs $1,150,000 in damages. The judgement was affirmed by a California Court of Appeal and the Supreme Court of California declined to hear the case.

Nevada petitioned to the U.S. Supreme Court, which granted certiorari. The opinion of the Court was authored by Justice John Paul Stevens, in which the Court held that the Constitution, specifically Article III and the Eleventh Amendment, did not prevent states from being sued in the courts of sister-states. It also held that California was not required to apply the Nevada statute limiting damages in suits against its state, because California had a substantial interest in allowing persons injured while driving on their highways to receive full compensation when they sued the responsible person(s) in their courts. In addition, Stevens noted that this interest was also furthered by the fact that California had waived its own immunity and allowed for full compensation in cases where the State of California was the defendant. Thus, applying the Nevada tort limit "would be obnoxious to its statutorily based policies of jurisdiction over nonresident motorists and full recovery." In his dissenting opinion, Justice Harry Blackmun argued that interstate sovereign immunity was found "not in an express provision of the Constitution but in a guarantee that is implied as an essential component of federalism." He also argued that this decision would cause states to refuse to recognize each others' immunity in retaliation, and that states would move assets out of other states, in an attempt to safeguard itself from liability, which would damage the federal system.

== Background ==
When Gilbert P. Hyatt started earning large sums of money from his microprocessor patent, he sold his California house and started renting an apartment in Nevada, a state with no income tax. On both his 1991 and 1992 tax returns, Hyatt claimed Nevada as his primary residence. The California Franchise Tax Board completed an audit in 1993 of Hyatt's tax returns, and determined that Hyatt's primary residence was actually California in 1991 and 1992; the FTB assessed Hyatt $13.3 million in back taxes and fraud penalties.

Hyatt filed a protest but after 11 years of administrative proceedings, it was upheld. As of May 13, 2019, an appeal is still pending. Hyatt also sued the FTB in Nevada, alleging that he was harassed by the FTB and became subject to unconstitutional invasions of privacy. California's lawyers argued that in accordance with the Full Faith and Credit Clause, Nevada state courts could not hold California tax collectors liable because California law immunizes tax collectors from liability. The Nevada Supreme Court rejected this argument, citing Nevada v. Hall; the judgment was affirmed in 2003 by the U.S. Supreme Court in Hyatt I.

Hyatt was then awarded $389 million in damages by a Nevada jury for fraud, invasion of privacy, intentional infliction of emotional distress, and in punitive damages. The Nevada trial court added more than $104.5 million in costs and prejudgment interest, for a total judgment exceeding $490 million, which was reduced over the course of several appeals. The dispute—Hyatt II—came before the U.S. Supreme Court a second time in 2016. The Court split 4–4 on the question of whether Nevada v. Hall should be overturned, effectively upholding it, but a majority did rule that because Nevada law limits the liability of its state agencies to $50,000 per tort, Nevada state courts could not award Hyatt more than that amount per tort, in keeping with the Full Faith and Credit Clause. Consequently, the Nevada Supreme Court deemed a new trial unnecessary, and simply reduced the damages granted to Hyatt to the permitted maximum. Because an earlier ruling by the Nevada Supreme Court in 2014 had limited FTB's liability to fraud and intentional infliction of emotional distress (two torts), the maximum award was set at $100,000.

== Supreme Court ==
On March 12, 2018, California lawyers filed a petition for a writ of certiorari, presenting the question: "Whether Nevada v. Hall, 440 U.S. 410 (1979), which permits a sovereign State to be hauled into another State's courts without its consent, should be overruled". In their petition, the lawyers argued that the Court should have an option to reconsider overruling Hall, because it split 4–4 on the question whether to overrule Hall in Hyatt II. They went on to argue that the "case remains an ideal vehicle to reconsider Hall". According to the petitioner, "'Hall's continuing viability is questionable' in light of more recent decisions of the Supreme Court, including Federal Maritime Commission, Alden, and Seminole Tribe." On April 9, Hyatt waived his right to respond to the petition, but the Court, on May 1, requested a response from him regardless. In his response, Hyatt argued that "Petitioner and its amici offer no such compelling justification for overruling Nevada v. Hall. The decision is almost 30 years old and yet Petitioner and its amici point to only a relatively small number of cases against state governments in the courts of other states and document little burden on state governments from such litigation." After the petitioner filed a reply to Hyatt's brief on June 6, the Court granted certiorari on June 28.

=== Oral arguments ===
Oral arguments
Transcript

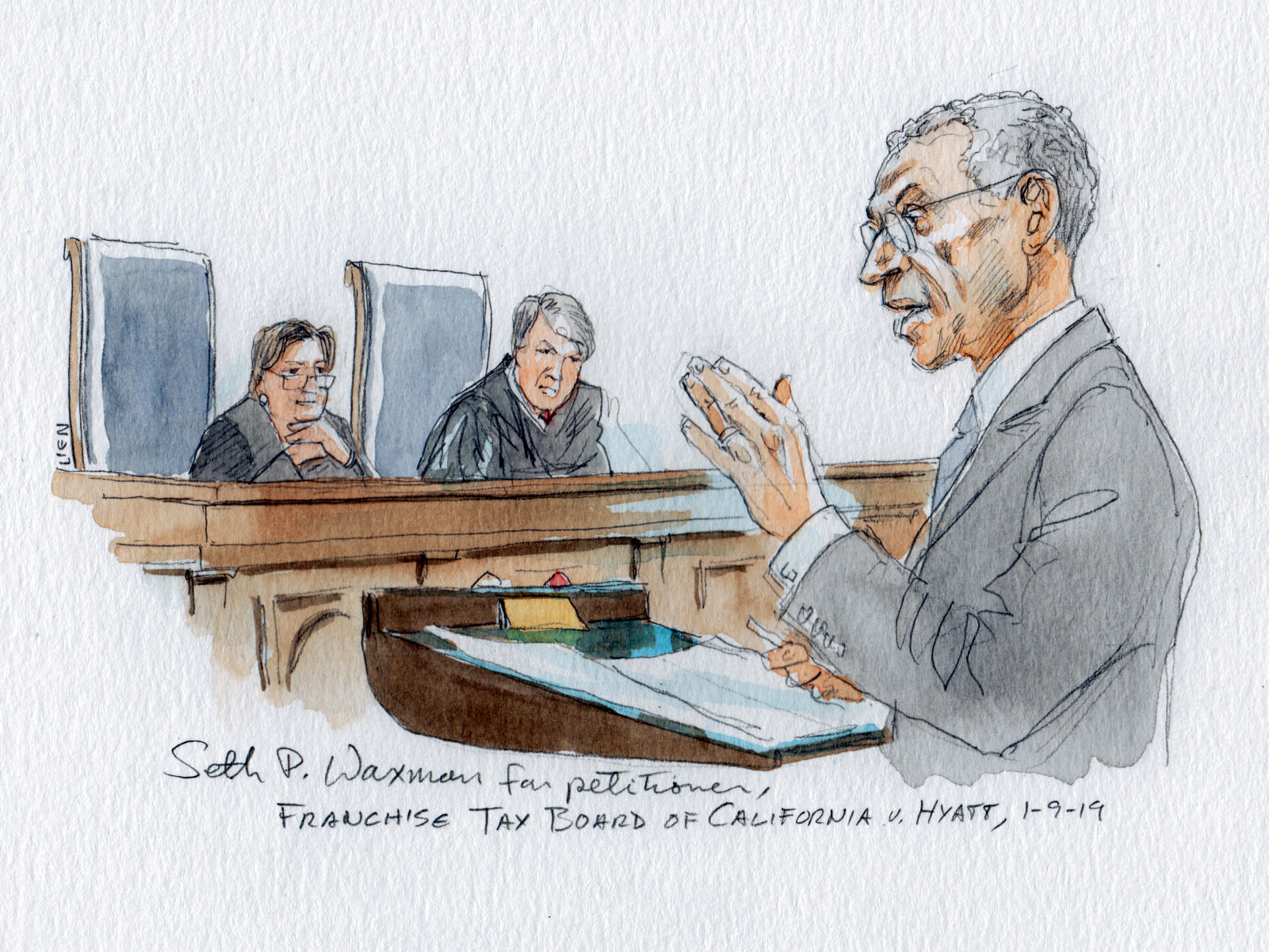
Seth P. Waxman for petitioner during oral arguments

The Court heard arguments in the case on January 9, 2019. Justice Ruth Bader Ginsburg was absent from the bench as she was recovering from a lung surgery, but did participate in the trial by reading briefs as well as the transcript of the oral arguments. Seth P. Waxman began by arguing for the petitioner, the FTB. Waxman started by arguing that states, prior to the enactment of the Constitution, enjoyed sovereign immunity under international law, because they were seen as separate sovereigns, with states having the "raw power" to engage in retaliation if their sovereignty was not recognized. The Constitution then created a "more perfect Union", according to Waxman, where states no longer had to rely on the "wild west of international law" for their sovereign immunity to be recognized in the courts of sister-states. Instead, the Constitution guaranteed this protection.

Justice Sonia Sotomayor questioned this idea by asking Waxman what text of the Constitution supported his analysis. She was followed by Justice Samuel Alito, who repeated the question later on, saying—possibly sarcastically—"we are all always very vigilant not to read things into the Constitution that can't be found in the text". On this question, Justice Brett Kavanaugh questioned why, if states considered their interstate sovereign immunity to be so important, they had not expressed that in the Constitution. Waxman addressed this question by arguing that the sovereignty was not found in the text of the Constitution, but its structure.

The only justice to mention the amicus curiae brief filed by professors William Baude and Stephen Sachs was Justice Elena Kagan, who mentioned it multiple times. Baude and Sachs argued that Hall was correctly decided insofar that states are not immune to suit in the courts of sister states. However, Baude and Sachs argued that: "the original Constitution did not force state or federal courts to respect the judgment of a court which lacked power over the defendant under traditional jurisdictional principles. Sister-state immunity was just such a principle. Thus, a State which tries to abrogate that immunity may find its judgments without effect in other American courts." Kagan asked what evidence Waxman had that supported his historical narrative over the narrative put forward over Baude and Sachs.

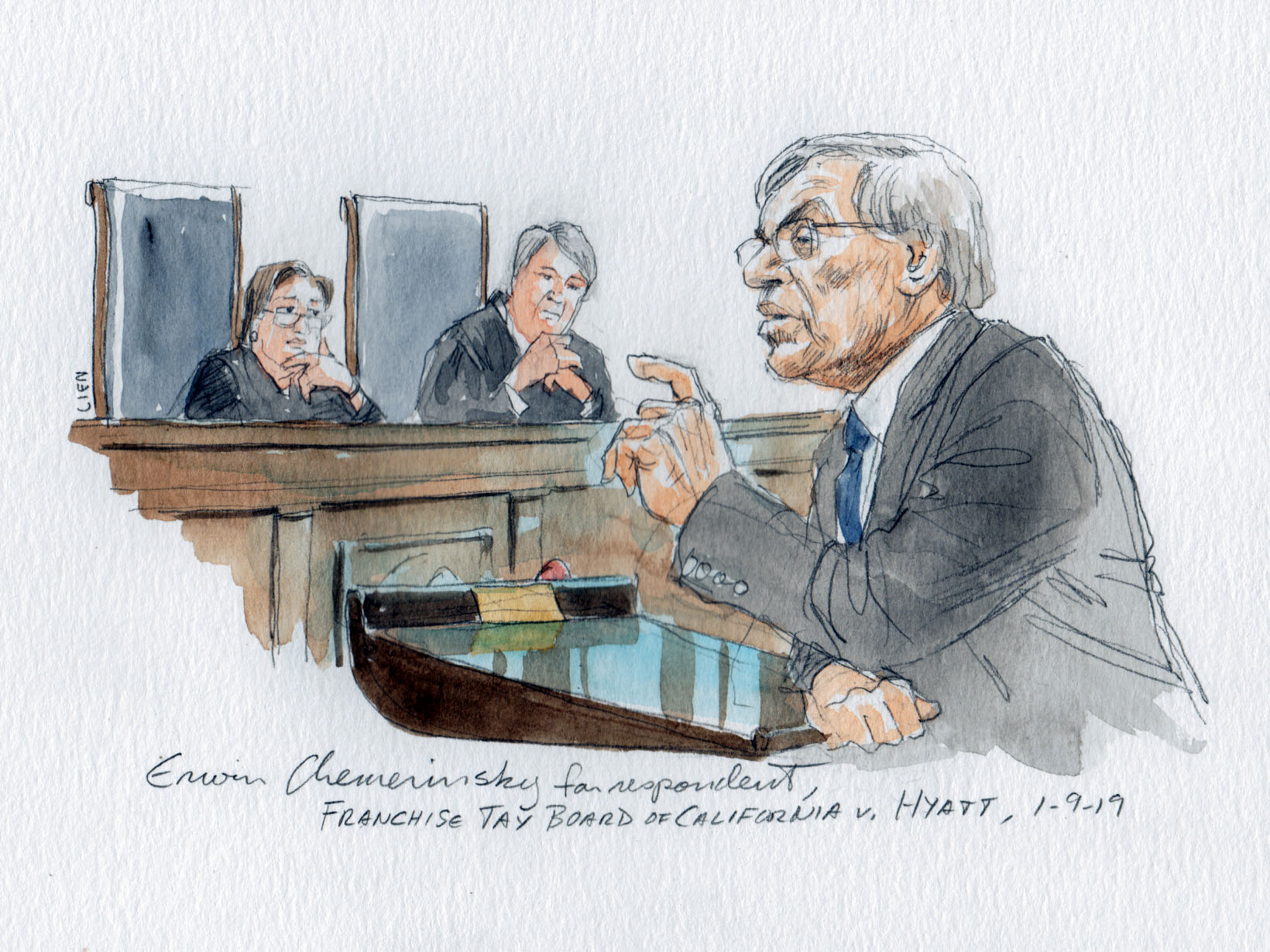
Erwin Chemerinsky for respondent during oral arguments

After Waxman, Erwin Chemerinsky began his arguments for the respondent. Chemerinsky argued that historically, states had been protected from suits in the courts of other states by interstate comity and that this still can protect states. Justice Sotomayor questioned whether comity was enough of a protection. Chemerinsky also pointed to the courts ruling in Hyatt II—where it held that states were required to extend the same immunities to sister states as it had themselves—which also provided protection to states. Justice Stephen Breyer also noted that if a state allowed abusive lawsuits against other states to take place in its own courts, the other states could sue the abusive state, whose "attitude would change".

Justice Alito challenged Chemerinsky by asking whether it was "plausible that there would be great concern about a state's being sued in a federal court, which is a more neutral tribunal, but no concern about a state being sued in ... the courts of another state?" Chemerinsky argued in response that the Framers were particularly concerned about abuse by the new federal government and that states did not want to relinquish its own power. Chemerinsky also argued, on the question of a textual basis for interstate sovereign immunity, that in the instances where the Constitution sought to "limit state power, it did so explicitly", as indicated by the Tenth Amendment to the United States Constitution. Chemerinsky further argued that the Court, in keeping with stare decisis, should only overturn Hall if circumstances had changed since its ruling in Hall. Justice Kavanaugh disagreed with this argument, noting that many prior overrulings would have been impossible under this standard. Instead, he argued, the Court could overturn past rulings if they are "egregiously wrong and the prior decision has severe practical consequences and there's no real reliance interest at stake".

During oral arguments, counsel for both parties discussed the amicus curiae filed in favour of petitioner by Indiana, joined by 44 other states. (Note: The five states which did not join the brief were California—a party to the case, Illinois, New Hampshire, New Mexico and New York.) Justice Sotomayor asked Waxman why the states which joined Indiana's brief did not propose an amendment to the Constitution similar to how the Eleventh Amendment was passed after the Chisholm v. Georgia decision. Waxman noted that the "Constitution is not amended lightly" and that the Court previously overturned its decisions even when states could have amended the Constitution, too. Chemerinsky later suggested that "you can[not] equate a brief filed by state attorney generals with the position of state governments". Chief Justice John Roberts attacked this suggestion, saying "It's a pretty remarkable assertion that we shouldn't understand representations of the states' attorneys general to represent the views of the state".

Besides Justice Ginsburg, who was not present, Justices Clarence Thomas and Neil Gorsuch did not ask any questions during oral arguments.

=== Majority opinion ===
Justice Clarence Thomas wrote the majority opinion, joined by Chief Justice John Roberts, and Justices Samuel Alito, Neil Gorsuch and Brett Kavanaugh. The opinion starts with a discussion on the history of state sovereign immunity. The first point made is that the Constitution's use of the word "State" reflects certain immunities and that the Founding Fathers supported absolute state immunity. Thomas also stated that, after the Supreme Court restricted state sovereignty in its Chisholm v. Georgia ruling, there was backlash causing the Eleventh Amendment to be passed. (Note: The Eleventh Amendment only restricts the ability of individuals to bring suit against states in federal court.) Thomas concluded that it would make "little sense" if sovereign immunity was not extended to state courts, and that "stare decisis does not compel continued adherence to this erroneous precedent". Thomas realized the results this ruling had on Hyatt, saying: "The consequences for the inventor are that he'll suffer the loss of two decades of litigation expenses and a final judgment against the Board for its egregious conduct. ... Those case-specific costs are not among the reliance interests that would persuade us to adhere to an incorrect resolution of an important constitutional question." Jay Michaelson criticized the opinion, saying "it's an imposition of Justice Thomas' specific, historically oriented 'originalism' philosophy."

=== Dissenting opinion ===
Justice Stephen Breyer wrote the dissenting opinion, joined by Justices Ruth Bader Ginsburg, Sonia Sotomayor and Elena Kagan. In the dissenting opinion, Breyer disputed the history of state sovereign immunity presented in the majority opinion. He said that the record only showed states granted each other sovereign immunity as a matter of custom, not because it was required by the Constitution. He argued the decision was not grounded in the text of the Constitution, since the 11th Amendment only applies to federal courts not state courts; rather, he argued, it was grounded in vague concepts like the 'constitutional design'. He also addressed the importance of precedent, saying that "To overrule a sound decision like Hall is to encourage litigants to seek to overrule other cases; it is to make it more difficult for lawyers to refrain from challenging settled law; and it is to cause the public to become increasingly uncertain about which cases the court will overrule and which cases are here to stay." In the opinion, Breyer named Planned Parenthood v. Casey, a 1992 case that narrowly affirmed the landmark abortion rights case Roe v. Wade, as an example of the importance of upholding precedent, especially under pressure from the Court's present conservative majority.

== See also ==
- List of United States Supreme Court cases, volume 587
- Hans v. Louisiana, a decision which re-affirmed state immunity in federal courts
- Janus v. AFSCME (2018), a case in which the liberal minority of the Supreme Court questioned the willingness of the conservative majority of the Supreme Court to ignore long-standing precedent and to overturn past rulings/to overrule precedent
- Knick v. Township of Scott, Pennsylvania (2019), another case in which the liberal minority of the Supreme Court questioned the willingness of the conservative majority of the Supreme Court to ignore long-standing precedent and to overturn past rulings/to overrule precedents
