= Franchise Tax Board of California v. Hyatt (2016) =

- Supreme Court of the United States

Argued December 7, 2015 Decided April 19, 2016
- Full case name: Franchise Tax Board of California, Petitioner v. Gilbert P. Hyatt
- Docket no.: 14-1175
- Citations: 578 U.S. 171 (more) 136 S. Ct. 1277; 194 L. Ed. 2d 431

Holding
- The Nevada rule not extending the same immunities to agencies of other states as it does to its own is a "policy of hostility" and unconstitutional under the Full Faith and Credit Clause.

Court membership
- Chief Justice John Roberts Associate Justices Anthony Kennedy · Clarence Thomas; Ruth Bader Ginsburg · Stephen Breyer; Samuel Alito · Sonia Sotomayor; Elena Kagan

Case opinions
- Majority: Breyer, joined by Kennedy, Ginsburg, Sotomayor, Kagan
- Concurrence: Alito (in judgment)
- Dissent: Roberts, joined by Thomas

Franchise Tax Board of California v. Hyatt (short: Hyatt II), 578 U.S. 171 (2016), was a United States Supreme Court case in which the Court held that the Nevada rule that does not extend the same immunities to agencies of other states as it does to its own is effectively a "policy of hostility", which is unconstitutional under the Full Faith and Credit Clause. The Court split equally on the question whether Nevada v. Hall should be overruled, effectively upholding it.

== United States Supreme Court ==
The Supreme Court issued its opinion on April 19, 2016. Writing for a 6-2 majority, Justice Breyer reasoned that the Supreme Court of Nevada's decision "applied a special rule of law applicable only in lawsuits against its sister States." Such a rule was unconstitutional under the Full Faith and Credit Clause.

=== Dissenting opinion ===
Chief Justice Robers wrote a dissenting opinion, joined by Justice Thomas.

== Subsequent developments ==
In 2019, in a majority opinion written by Justice Thomas, the Court expressly overruled Nevada v. Hall.
