= Nevada v. Hall =

- Supreme Court of the United States

Argued November 7, 1978 Decided March 5, 1979
- Full case name: Nevada et al. v. Hall et al.
- Docket no.: 77-1337
- Citations: 440 U.S. 410 (more) 99 S. Ct. 1182
- Argument: Oral argument
- Opinion announcement: Opinion announcement
- Decision: Opinion

Case history
- Prior: Hall v. Univ. of Nevada, 74 Cal. App. 3d 280, 141 Cal. Rptr. 439 (Ct. App. 1977); cert. granted, 436 U.S. 925 (1978).
- Subsequent: Rehearing denied, 441 U.S. 917 (1979).

Holding
- States have no sovereign immunity from suits against them in courts of other states.

Court membership
- Chief Justice Warren E. Burger Associate Justices William J. Brennan Jr. · Potter Stewart; Byron White · Thurgood Marshall; Harry Blackmun · Lewis F. Powell Jr. William Rehnquist · John P. Stevens

Case opinions
- Majority: Stevens, joined by Brennan, Stewart, White, Marshall, Powell
- Dissent: Blackmun, joined by Burger, Rehnquist
- Dissent: Rehnquist, joined by Burger
- Overruled by
- Franchise Tax Board of California v. Hyatt (2019)

Nevada v. Hall, 440 U.S. 410 (1979), was a United States Supreme Court case that ruled that U.S. states lack sovereign immunity from private lawsuits filed against them in the courts of another state. The majority opinion held that "nothing in the Constitution authorizes or obligates" states to grant sister states immunity in court. States may grant sister states immunity if they choose. This decision was overturned by the 2019 case Franchise Tax Board of California v. Hyatt.

== Case ==
On May 13, 1968, Helmut Kurt Bohm, an administrative employee of the University of Nevada-Reno, drove a university-owned car to pick up office supplies at a location in California. On his way back to Reno, Bohm lost control of his car during a rainstorm on Interstate 80 near Penryn, California. Investigators said Bohm may have fallen asleep at the wheel. His car crossed the divider into oncoming traffic, and collided with a car occupied by John and Patricia Hall, their three children, and another passenger, all California residents. Bohm was killed in the collision, and all six passengers in the other car were injured. In particular, the Halls' youngest child John Michael, 20 months old at the time of the crash, was comatose for 40 days after the crash, and subsequently developed significant mental and developmental disabilities. Patricia sustained brain damage and was forced to leave her job.

The Halls attempted to claim damages from the state of Nevada, but the Nevada Board of Examiners denied their claim. Since California state law allowed motorists residing in other states to be sued in its state courts, the Halls sued Bohm's estate, the University of Nevada-Reno, and the state of Nevada in the Superior Court of the City of San Francisco. The Superior Court ordered that the state of Nevada be left out of the suit, thinking that sovereign immunity would prevent the state from being sued in an out-of-state court. However, the California Supreme Court reversed that order, arguing that state law permitted other states to be sued within its courts. Nevada petitioned the U.S. Supreme Court to overturn this decision, but the Court denied certiorari.

In a pretrial motion, Nevada argued that any damages awarded to the Halls had to follow Nevada state law, which set a maximum of $25,000 for damages awarded in tort actions against the state. The argument rested on the Constitution's Full Faith and Credit Clause, which requires states to recognize and enforce the laws and judicial proceedings of other states. The Superior Court denied this motion, and in 1976 a jury awarded the Halls $1,150,000 in damages.

Nevada sought to appeal the ruling, but the California Court of Appeal upheld it and the California Supreme Court declined to hear the case. The case was then brought to the U.S. Supreme Court, which now granted a writ of certiorari. In the majority opinion, delivered by Justice Stevens, the Court found that the concept of "sovereign immunity" only applied within a state's own jurisdiction, and did not protect states from prosecution outside that jurisdiction. It found that "the Full Faith and Credit Clause does not require a State to apply another State's law in violation of its own legitimate public policy", and that no other part of the Constitution protected a state from prosecution outside its boundaries. Thus, it concluded that the doctrine of sovereign immunity, although well established, was nothing "more than a matter of comity", and upheld the original ruling.

In a dissenting opinion, Justice Blackmun wrote that the decision could have sweeping consequences: "I suspect that the Court has opened the door to avenues of liability and interstate retaliation that will prove unsettling and upsetting for our federal system."

== See also ==
- List of United States Supreme Court cases, volume 440
- Hollingsworth v. Virginia, a decision which held that the Eleventh Amendment is retroactive.
- Hans v. Louisiana, a decision which re-affirmed state immunity in federal courts.
