= Civil forfeiture in the United States =

Aspect of U.S. law enforcement

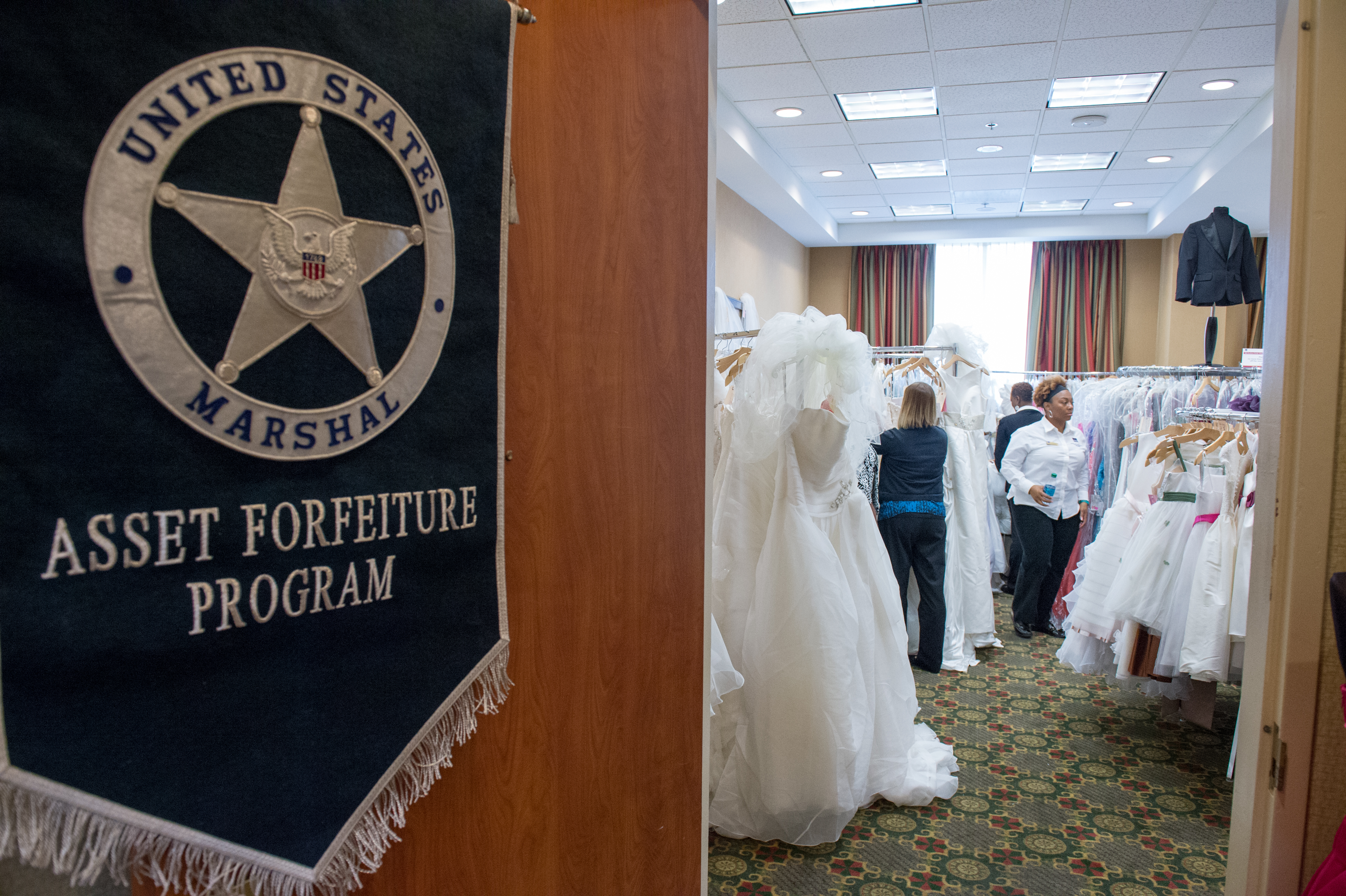
The U.S. Marshals and GSA sold 2,000 dresses and accessories near Baltimore in 2015. The dresses were seized in connection with the criminal conviction of a woman who supported her wedding boutique by embezzling over $5 million from her employer.

In the United States, civil forfeiture (also called civil asset forfeiture or civil judicial forfeiture) is a process in which law enforcement officers take assets from people who are suspected of involvement with crime or illegal activity without necessarily charging the owners with wrongdoing. While civil procedure, as opposed to criminal procedure, generally involves a dispute between two private citizens, civil forfeiture involves a dispute between law enforcement and property such as a pile of cash, a house or a boat, such that the thing is suspected of being involved in a crime. To get back the seized property, owners must prove it was not involved in criminal activity. Sometimes it can mean a threat to seize property as well as the act of seizure itself. Civil forfeiture is not considered to be an example of a criminal justice financial obligation.

Proponents see civil forfeiture as a powerful tool to thwart criminal organizations involved in the illegal drug trade, since it allows authorities to seize cash and other assets from suspected narcotics traffickers. They also argue that it is an efficient method since it allows law enforcement agencies to use these seized proceeds to further battle illegal activity, that is, directly converting value obtained for law enforcement purposes by harming suspected criminals economically while helping law enforcement financially.

Critics argue that innocent owners can become entangled in the process to the extent that their 4th Amendment and 5th Amendment rights are violated, in situations where they are presumed guilty instead of being presumed innocent. It has been ruled unconstitutional by a judge in South Carolina. Further, critics argue that the incentives lead to corruption and law enforcement misbehavior. There is consensus that abuses have happened but disagreement about their extent as well as whether the overall benefits to society are worth the cost of the instances of abuse.

Civil forfeitures are subject to the "excessive fines" clause of the U.S. Constitution's 8th amendment, both at a federal level and, as determined by the 2019 Supreme Court case, Timbs v. Indiana, at the state and local level. A 2020 study found that the median cash forfeiture in 21 states which track such data was $1,300.

== History ==
=== Legal origins ===
Civil forfeiture in the United States has a history dating back several hundred years, with roots in British maritime law. In the mid-1600s, when what would become the United States was a British colony, the British Navigation Acts were enacted. These laws required ships importing or exporting goods from British ports to fly the British flag; ships that failed to do this could be seized regardless of whether the ship's owner was guilty of any wrongdoing. It was easier to seize a vessel than try to apprehend the owner, who may be on the other side of the ocean.

During the later Colonial years, forfeiture practices by Crown officials using writs of assistance were one of the many activities that angered colonists, who saw the writs as "unreasonable searches and seizures" that deprived persons of "life, liberty, or property, without due process".

After the American Revolution, the early Congress wrote forfeiture laws based on British maritime law to help federal tax collectors collect customs duties, which financed most of the expenses of the federal government in the early days of the Republic. Seizures allowed government to confiscate property from citizens who failed to pay taxes or customs duties. The Supreme Court upheld these forfeiture statutes in situations where it was virtually impossible to get hold of guilty persons on the high seas while possible to get hold of their property. As explained by Supreme Court justice Joseph Story:

[A] vessel which commits the aggression is treated as the offender, as the guilty instrument or thing to which the forfeiture attaches, without any reference whatsoever to the character or conduct of the owner. [The seizure of the ship is justified by] the necessity of the case, as the only adequate means of suppressing the offense or wrong, or insuring an indemnity to the injured party.

During much of the 19th century, little attention was paid to forfeiture laws.

=== Prohibition era ===
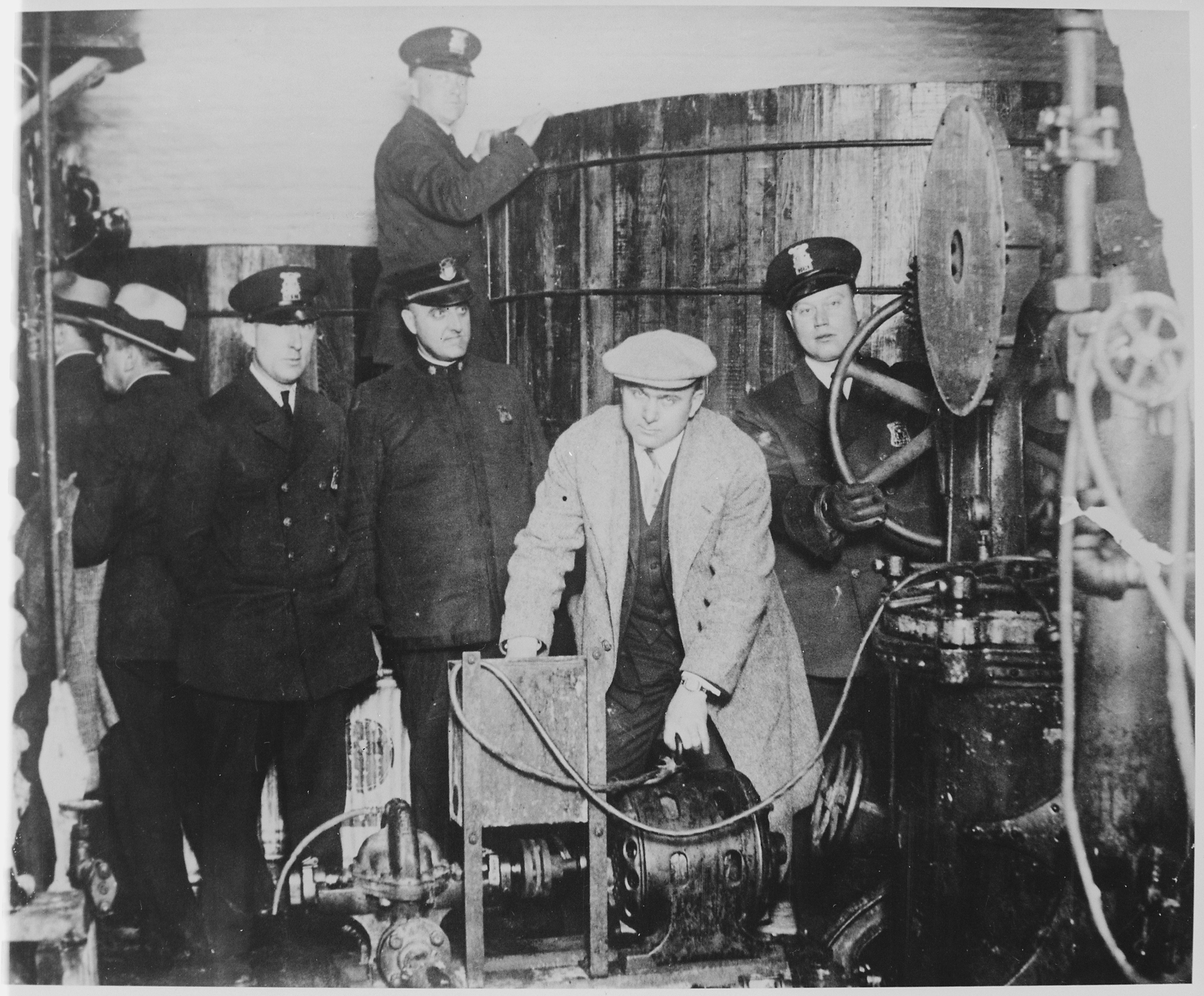
During Prohibition, Detroit police inspect equipment suspected of being used to make alcohol; under civil forfeiture laws, police could seize the equipment without having to charge any owners with a crime.

The US Government used forfeiture during the Prohibition years (1920–1933). Police seized vehicles, equipment, cash and other property from bootleggers. When Prohibition ended in 1933, much of the forfeiture activity ended as well. Modern forfeiture was an "infrequent resort" until the last few decades.

=== War on drugs (1980–present) ===
Since 1980, the war on drugs has led to substantially increased civil forfeiture by federal, state, and local government. The market for illegal drugs in the United States is large: the Drug Enforcement Administration estimates the annual profit from selling illegal drugs is $12 billion. However, it has become harder for criminal organizations to launder drug money by means of the financial system; drug cartels have thus preferred bulk cash payments. The initial intent behind increased civil forfeiture was thus to use forfeitures as a weapon against drug kingpins, similarly to how forfeiture was used to fight alcohol trafficking during the Prohibition era.

According to journalist Sarah Stillman, a major turning point in forfeiture activity was the passage of the Comprehensive Crime Control Act of 1984. This law permitted local and federal law enforcement agencies to share seized assets. According to Stillman, civil forfeiture allowed federal and local governments to "extract swift penalties from white-collar criminals and offer restitution to victims of fraud". From 1985 to 1993, authorities confiscated $3 billion of cash and other property based on the federal Asset Forfeiture Program, which included both civil and criminal forfeitures. The methods were supported by the Reagan administration as a crime fighting strategy:

It's now possible for a drug dealer to serve time in a forfeiture-financed prison after being arrested by agents driving a forfeiture-provided automobile while working in a forfeiture-funded sting operation.

— Reagan attorney general Richard Thornburgh in 1989.

The politics of civil forfeiture were somewhat unusual. The federal forfeiture laws were introduced and pushed through Congress by Republicans in the 1980s, with some Democrats supportive and some critical. Additionally, some libertarian-leaning Republican members of Congress have been critical of civil forfeiture, considering it offensive to property rights. Civil liberties organizations like the American Civil Liberties Union have long been opponents of civil forfeiture. A common criticism of civil forfeiture is that it adversely affects minorities and people from low-income communities (whose seizures are typically less than $500).

Forfeiture was used for purposes other than trying to discourage illegal drug activity, such as attempts in New York City to discourage drunk driving. Forfeiture rules were used to confiscate cars of intoxicated motorists. In such instances, there are two types of cases: a criminal case against the drunk driver as a person, and a civil case against the property used to facilitate the drunk driving, specifically their car. Critics contend that the punishment can be "deemed out of proportion with the offense"; for example, after a drunk driver is arrested and convicted and possibly imprisoned, is it proper to punish him or her additionally by civil forfeiture means by confiscating a $50,000 car? Civil forfeiture has been used to discourage illegal activities such as cockfighting, drag racing, gambling in basements, poaching of endangered fish, securities fraud, and other illegal activity.

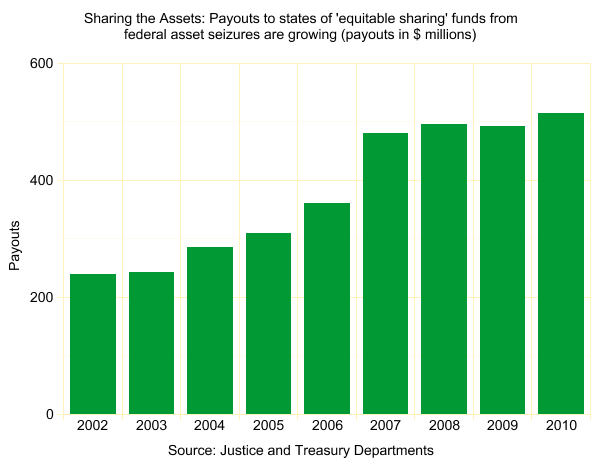
A chart showing that payouts are growing, according to the equitable sharing arrangement. Source: United States Justice and Treasury Departments.

Courts helped set up the legal framework to help law enforcement stem the drug tide while sometimes trying to rein in abuses. A 1984 law set up the equitable sharing arrangement in which state and local police can share the seizures with federal agents. While the 1993 Supreme Court case Austin v. United States ruled that a forfeiture could be considered as an excessive fine, the court upheld the principle of civil forfeiture generally. A 1996 Supreme Court decision ruled that prosecuting a person for a crime and seizing his or her property via civil forfeiture did not constitute double jeopardy, and therefore did not violate the Constitution. However, in 1999, the Supreme Court ruled that civil forfeiture was not permitted if the amount seized was "grossly disproportional" to the gravity of the offense.

Legislatures played a role as well. Since the 1990s, the number of federal statutes permitting government forfeiture doubled from 200 to 400. In 2000, lawmakers passed the Civil Asset Forfeiture Reform Act, or CAFRA, which stipulated protections for individuals and increased the level of proof required. Critics said that the new guidelines did not require poor persons to have free access to legal services. CAFRA guidelines suggest that if a claimant wins a civil-forfeiture case, that some of the legal fees paid to recover the property are partially payable by the government. CAFRA was supposed to raise government's burden of proof before seizing property. CAFRA meant if government loses a forfeiture challenge, government must pay the victim's attorney costs, but often victims are unaware of this fact, so they fail to hire lawyers thinking the cost will be prohibitive.

Police forces heeded instruction from a law enforcement consultant named Joe David who had an "uncanny talent for finding cocaine and cash in cars and trucks", according to one report. Officers trained in David's so-called Desert Snow stop-and-seizure techniques raked in $427 million from highway encounters during a five-year period. A contract allowed David's consulting firm to keep 25% of the seized cash.

But when innocent owners were sometimes ensnarled in seizure proceedings, it spurred criticism. In the early 1990s, San Francisco-based defense attorney Brenda Grantland organized a group called Forfeiture Endangers American Rights (which spells the letters FEAR), with branches in New Jersey, Virginia, California, and Massachusetts. Debate about reforming civil forfeiture procedures happened in the late 1990s but after public scrutiny died down, lawmakers quietly relaxed the reforms at the behest of police groups and prosecutors without much public debate.

Civil forfeiture was used successfully on many occasions. For example, it was used to seize assets by corrupt foreigners, such as against Teodoro Nguema Obiang Mangue, who stole money from the African nation of Equatorial Guinea and was convicted. Overall, the pattern in recent decades has been a substantial increase in forfeiture activity. According to government records, Justice department seizures went from $27 million in 1985 to $556 million in 1993 and $4.2 billion in 2012.

In 2015, Eric Holder ended the policy of "adoptive forfeiture", which occurred "when a state or local law enforcement agency seizes property pursuant to state law and requests that a federal agency take the seized asset and forfeit it under federal law" due to abuse. Although states proceeded to curtail the powers of police to seize assets, actions by the Justice Department in July 2017 have sought to reinstate police seizure powers that simultaneously raise funding for federal agencies and local law enforcement.

== Legal background ==
=== Civil vs criminal forfeiture ===
Aspect	Civil forfeiture	Criminal forfeiture
Jurisdiction	In rem	In personam
Burden of proof	Preponderance of evidence	Beyond a reasonable doubt
Court can take account of the defendant's 5th Amendment rights	Yes	No
Assets returned if:	Owner proves innocence	Prosecution cannot prove guilt
Case law example	United States v. Forty-Three Gallons of Whiskey	United States v. John Doe

Civil procedure cases generally involve disputes between two private citizens, often about money or property, while criminal procedure involves a dispute between a private citizen and the state, usually because a law has been broken. In legal systems based on English common law such as that of the United States, civil and criminal law cases are handled differently, with different tests and standards and procedures, and this is true of forfeiture proceedings as well. Both civil and criminal forfeiture involve the taking of assets by police.

In civil forfeiture, assets are seized by police based on a suspicion of wrongdoing, and without having to charge a person with specific wrongdoing, with the case being between police and the thing itself, sometimes referred to by the Latin term in rem, meaning "against the property"; the property itself is the defendant and no criminal charge against the owner is needed.

In contrast, criminal forfeiture is a legal action brought as "part of the criminal prosecution of a defendant", described by the Latin term in personam, meaning "against the person", and happens when government indicts or charges the property that is either used in connection with a crime, or derived from a crime, that is suspected of being committed by the defendant; the seized assets are temporarily held and become government property officially after an accused person has been convicted by a court of law; if the person is found to be not guilty, the seized property must be returned.

The tests to establish the burden of proof are different; in civil forfeiture, the test in most cases is whether police feel there is a preponderance of the evidence suggesting wrongdoing; in criminal forfeiture, the test is whether police feel the evidence is beyond a reasonable doubt, which is a tougher test to meet.

If property is seized in a civil forfeiture, it is "up to the owner to prove that his cash is clean". Normally both civil and criminal forfeiture require involvement by the judiciary; however, there is a variant of civil forfeiture called administrative forfeiture, which is essentially a civil forfeiture that does not require involvement by the judiciary, which derives its powers from the Tariff Act of 1930, and empowers police to seize banned imported merchandise, as well as things used to import or transport or store a controlled substance, money, or other property that is less than $500,000 value.

=== Justification ===
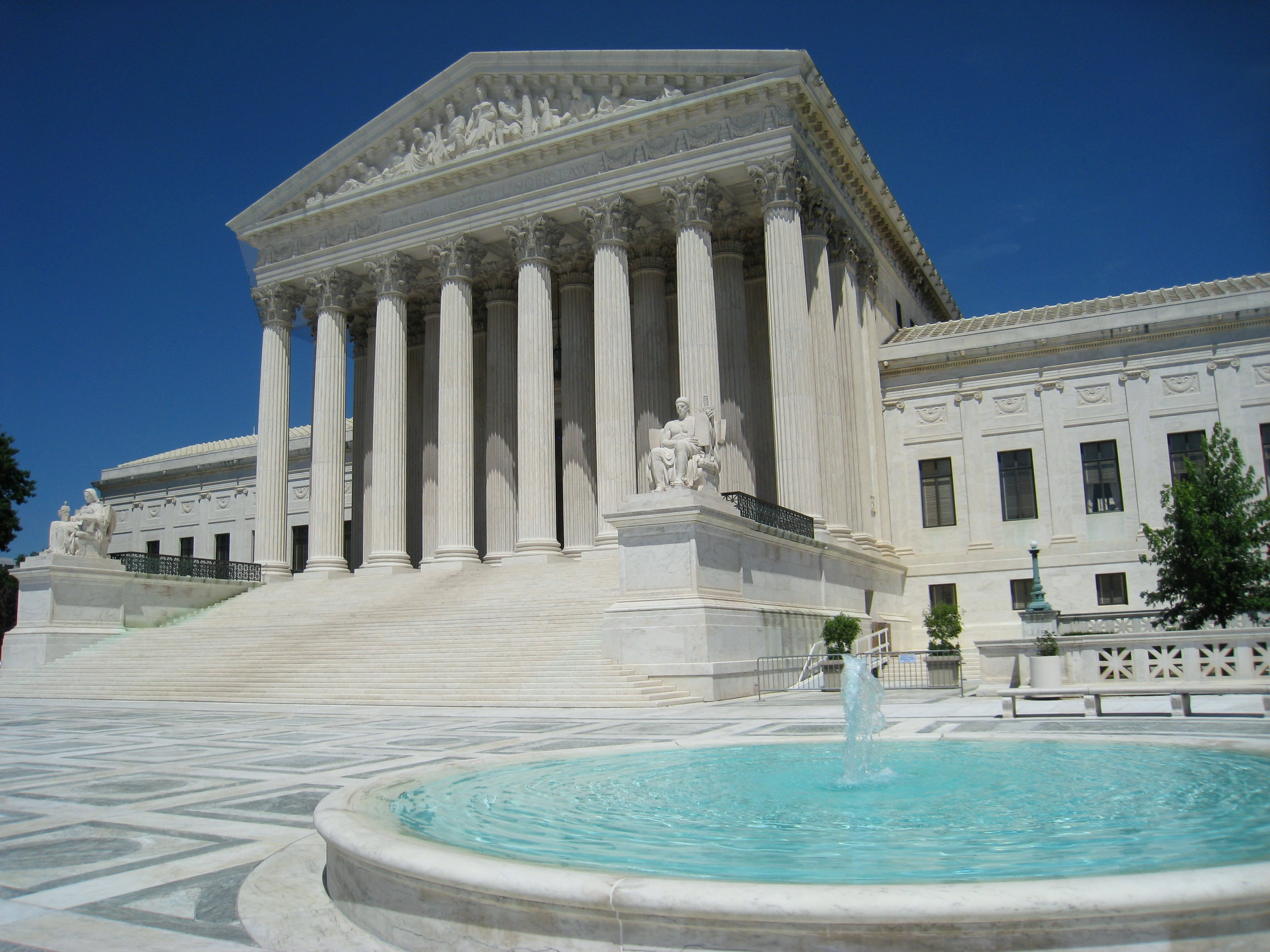
The Supreme Court has generally upheld the principle of civil forfeiture.

According to the Justice Department, there are three main justifications for civil forfeitures:

1. Punishment and deterrence: To punish and deter criminal activity by depriving criminals of property used or acquired through illegal activities.
2. Enhance police cooperation: To enhance cooperation among foreign, federal, state, and local law enforcement agencies, through the equitable sharing of assets recovered through this program.
3. Revenue for law enforcement: As a byproduct, to produce revenues to enhance forfeitures and strengthen law enforcement.

Since a prosecutor can charge a person with a crime in a criminal case and charge his or her things in a civil case, issues such as double jeopardy have been raised. Further, there has been debate about whether seizures of property are considered as a fine or as a punishment in a legal sense. The distinction was clarified by the Supreme Court in United States v. Bajakajian, which decreed that a criminal forfeiture could be considered as both a type of fine and a punishment, while a civil forfeiture was not intended as a punishment of a person but rather a "legal fiction of punishing the property". As a result, the court decreed that civil forfeitures that served as remedial were not considered as a type of fine.

The United States Supreme Court has upheld the principle of civil asset forfeiture at the federal level. The Court ruled in Austin v. United States (1993) that such civil forfeiture, treated as punitive actions, are subject to the Excessive Fines clause of the Eighth Amendment. The Supreme Court ruled in Timbs v. Indiana (2019) that protection against excessive fees in civil forfeiture is also incorporated against state and local government.

In addition, there are more than 400 federal statutes that empower police to take assets from convicted criminals, as well as from persons not charged with criminality. Sometimes the seizures happen as a result of different government agencies working together, such as the Internal Revenue Service and the Department of Justice. Police at national and state levels cooperate in many instances according to procedural laws known as equitable sharing. In addition, there are laws that make it difficult for criminals to get dirty money clean by methods of money laundering; for example, law requires that cash deposits greater than $10,000 to a bank account be reported by the bank to the federal government, and there have been instances in which repeated cash deposits under this amount have looked suspicious to authorities even though they were done legitimately, leading to civil forfeiture seizures directly from a bank account. What has caused controversy is when the property of innocent persons is seized by police who believe that the seized items were involved in criminal activity.

A June 2019 study found that more equitable sharing funds do not translate into more crimes solved, nor improving overall police effectiveness. Such funds also do not lead to less drug use. And forfeiture rates are linked to local economic performance, increasing when the local economy suffers, suggesting that such tactics are more geared towards raising revenue, not fighting crime.

=== Prevalence ===
Although there are accessible statistics of seizures at the federal level, it often happens that the totals of forfeitures from both criminals and innocent owners are combined; for example, one report was that in 2010, government seized $2.5 billion in assets from criminals and innocent owners by forfeiture methods, and the totals of assets seized incorrectly from innocent owners was not separated statistically. Further, since the United States is a federal republic with governments at both the national and state level, there are civil forfeiture seizures at the state level, which are not tracked and recorded in any central database, which make it difficult to make assessments, since state laws and procedures vary widely. According to The Washington Post, federal asset forfeiture in 2014 accounted for over $5 billion going into Justice and Treasury Department coffers, while in comparison, official statistics show that the amount stolen from citizens by burglars during that same year was a mere $3.5 billion.

== Methods ==
Civil forfeiture begins when government suspects that a property is connected with illegal drug activity, and files a civil action:

The government simply files a civil action in rem against the property itself, and then generally must prove, by a preponderance of the evidence, that the property is forfeitable under the applicable forfeiture statute. Civil forfeiture is independent of any criminal case, and because of this, the forfeiture action may be filed before indictment, after indictment, or even if there is no indictment. Likewise, civil forfeiture may be sought in cases in which the owner is criminally acquitted of the underlying crimes ...

— Craig Gaumer, Assistant United States Attorney, 2007

Properties that can be confiscated include real estate property such as a house or motel, cars, cash, jewelry, boats, and almost anything suspected of being related to the manufacture and sale and transportation of illegal controlled substances, such as:

1. controlled substances
2. raw materials needed to make them
3. containers to hold them
4. vehicles to transport them
5. information for manufacture and distribution, such as books, records, and formulas
6. money and other valuables "used or intended to be used" to buy or sell them
7. property facilitating illegal transactions
8. chemicals needed to make them
9. machines for making capsules and tablets
10. drug paraphernalia
11. firearms

=== Traffic stops ===
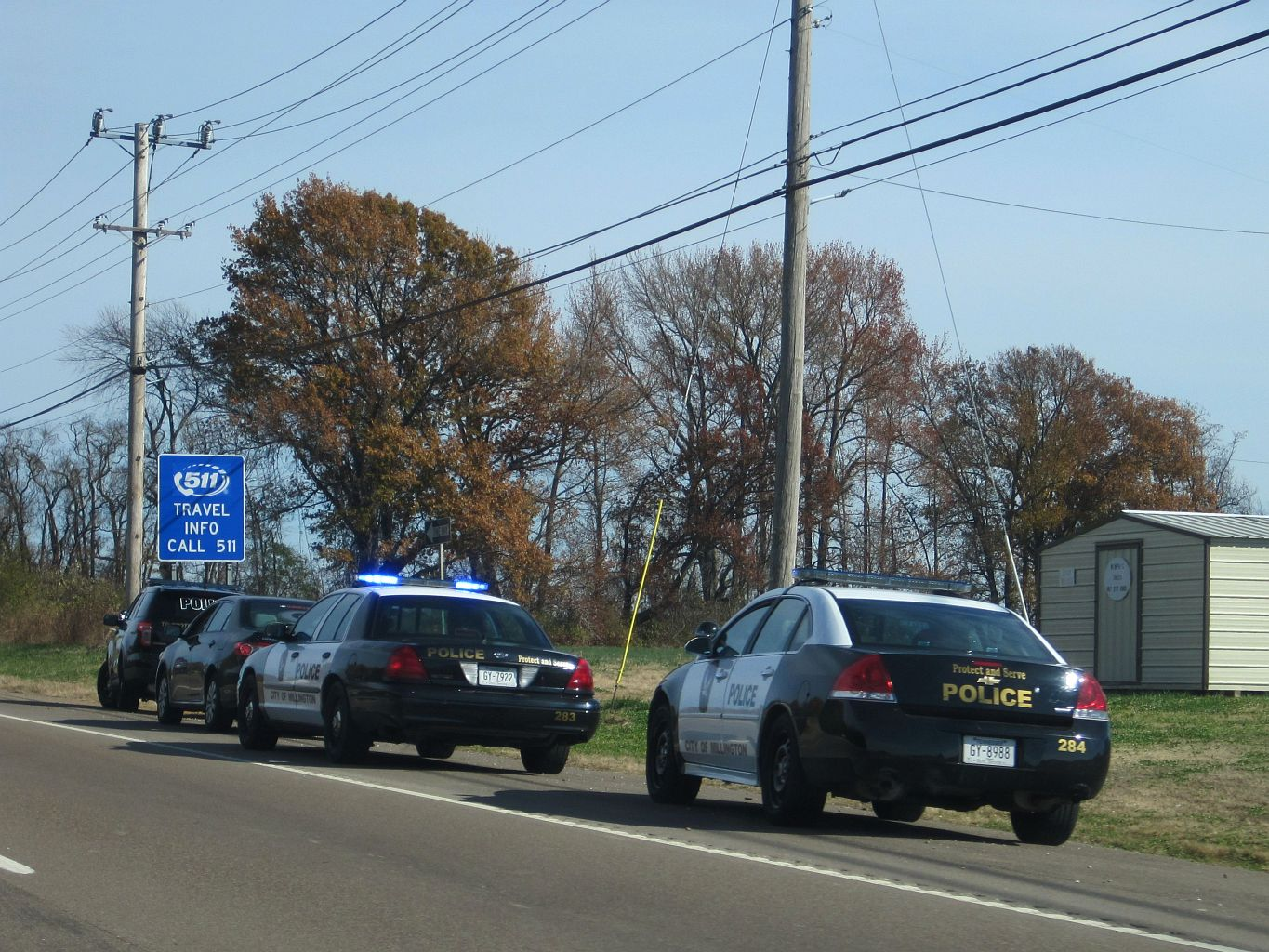
A motorist stopped by police in Tennessee.

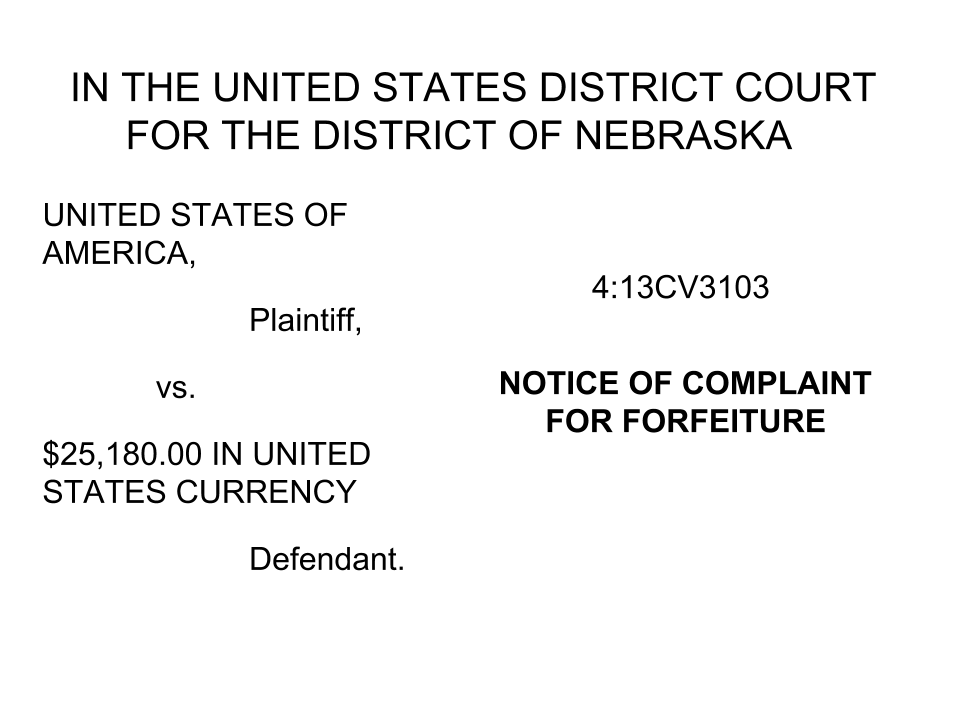
In a civil forfeiture case in the United States, the state is the plaintiff and a thing is the defendant—in this case, the thing is $25,180 cash that was seized by police under suspicion of being involved in illegal activity. In legal terms, it is an in rem case (against a thing) as opposed to an in personam case (against a person). Here is the docket for a real case that happened after police seized money.

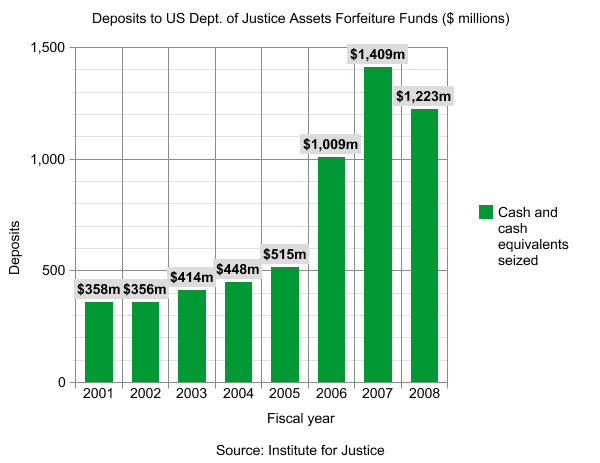
From 2006 to 2008, currency deposits alone exceeded $1 billion for each year. Source: the Institute for Justice

One method of intercepting funds is by highway interdictions, typically along highway routes suspected to be used regularly by drug smugglers, often between Mexico and the United States.

News media have reported many examples:

- Mandrel Stuart was not charged with a crime and there was no evidence of illegal activity but police seized his money because they assumed it was drug-related:
  Mandrel Stuart and his girlfriend were on a date driving on Interstate 66 ... The traffic stop on that balmy afternoon in August 2012 was the beginning of a dizzying encounter that would leave Stuart shaken and wondering whether he had been singled out because he was black and had a police record. Over the next two hours, he would be detained without charges, handcuffed and taken to a nearby police station ... stripped of $17,550 in cash ... earned through ... a small barbecue restaurant ... he was going to use the money that night for supplies and equipment.
  — report in The Washington Post, 2014
- Javier Gonzalez was carrying $10,000 cash in a briefcase and got pulled over in Texas; deputies handed Gonzalez a waiver, that if he signed over the money and did not claim it later, he would not be arrested, but if he refused to sign the waiver, Gonzalez would be arrested for money-laundering. Gonzalez signed the waiver wondering if the officers were real "officers of law" and wondering if he got robbed, but later sued the county, which lost, and returned his cash plus paid him $110,000 in damages plus attorney's fees.
- Matt Lee of Clare, Michigan, was driving to California with $2,500 cash when pulled over by police in Nevada, who seized almost all of the cash under suspicion that it was a "drug run"; Lee hired an attorney who took half as his fee, leaving Lee with only $1130 remaining.
  I just couldn't believe that police could do that to anyone ... It's like they are at war with innocent people.
  — Matt Lee, interviewed in The Washington Post, 2013
- Tan Nguyen. In 2008, a federal judge ordered $50,000 returned to a man after police seized the money during a traffic stop in Nebraska, after reviewing a recording of the seizure in which a sheriff's deputy suggested that we "take his money and, um, count it as a drug seizure". Tan Nguyen's $50,000 was confiscated by police during a traffic stop, and the county agreed to return the funds after a legal challenge.
- In May 2010 a couple was driving from New York to Florida and they were stopped by police because of a cracked windshield. During questioning, the officer decided that $32,000 cash in the van was "probably involved in criminal or drug-related activity", seized it, shared it with federal authorities under equitable sharing. The victim hired a lawyer to get back the seized money who urged settling for half of the seized amount, and after the lawyer's fees, the victim got back only $7,000.
- A 2013 The New Yorker piece detailed abuses in Tenaha, Texas, where police would target out-of-state drivers using rental cars, often not issuing traffic tickets, and disproportionately pulling over African Americans and Latino-Americans. Police sometimes ask stopped motorists to sign "roadside property waivers", which, unless signed, threaten criminal charges unless valuables are handed over; the waivers say, in effect, that victims will not contest the seizure in exchange for not being arrested.

If a passing motorist does not sign a waiver and it becomes recorded as a legal case, the case names are often unusual. In a civil forfeiture case, the asset itself is listed as the "defendant". For example, one case was titled State of Texas v. One Gold Crucifix, based on a traffic stop in which a woman was pulled over, no charges were filed, but this item of jewelry was seized. Another case name was United States v. $35,651.11 in U.S. Currency.

The Washington Post analyzed 400 seizures in 17 states that were examples of equitable sharing arrangements. Police stop motorists under the pretext of a minor traffic infraction, and "analyze" the intentions of motorists by assessing nervousness, and request permission to search the vehicle without a warrant; however, of the 400 seizures studied by The Washington Post, police did not make any arrests.

=== Other cash seizures ===
Cash has been seized in peculiar circumstances. For example, New York businessman James Lieto's $392,000 in cash was seized by federal authorities, since his legitimate funds mixed up with illegal funds in an armored car that was seized by an FBI probe. Lieto had to wait until the government's criminal case was finished before he could get his money back, which took considerable time, and caused considerable financial hardship and stress.

Police have broken into homes. In March 2012, in the middle of the night, without a warrant, New York City police burst into the home of Gerald Bryan, ransacked his belongings, ripped out light fixtures, arrested him, and seized $4,800 of his cash, but after a year, the case against him was dropped. When Bryan tried to get back his money, he was told it was "too late" since the money had already been put into the police pension fund. Victims of forfeiture often find themselves faced with fighting in a "labyrinthine" procedure to get their money back.

In May, 2013, IRS agents seized $32,821 from the account of a restaurant owner in Arnolds Park, Iowa, on suspicion of tax evasion, but the seizure was contested by lawyers from the Institute for Justice.

The IRS is increasingly taking money from legitimate businesspeople who ... run an honest cash business and make frequent cash deposits ... The government doesn't allege that she evaded taxes. The government doesn't allege that she was depositing money from an illicit source. She's simply depositing her own lawfully-earned money ... that she gets from customers in her restaurant ...

— Institute for Justice attorney Larry Salzman, 2014

The U.S. Drug Enforcement Administration has been seizing cash from passengers on domestic flights. Agents seized $209 million in cash from travelers at the 15 busiest airports from 2006 to 2016, according to an investigation by USA Today. Agents seized $82,373 from a passenger, transporting her father's life savings, while boarding a domestic flight, despite no indication of criminal activity or drug use or charges, leading to a lawsuit to get the funds returned.

=== Seizures of real estate ===
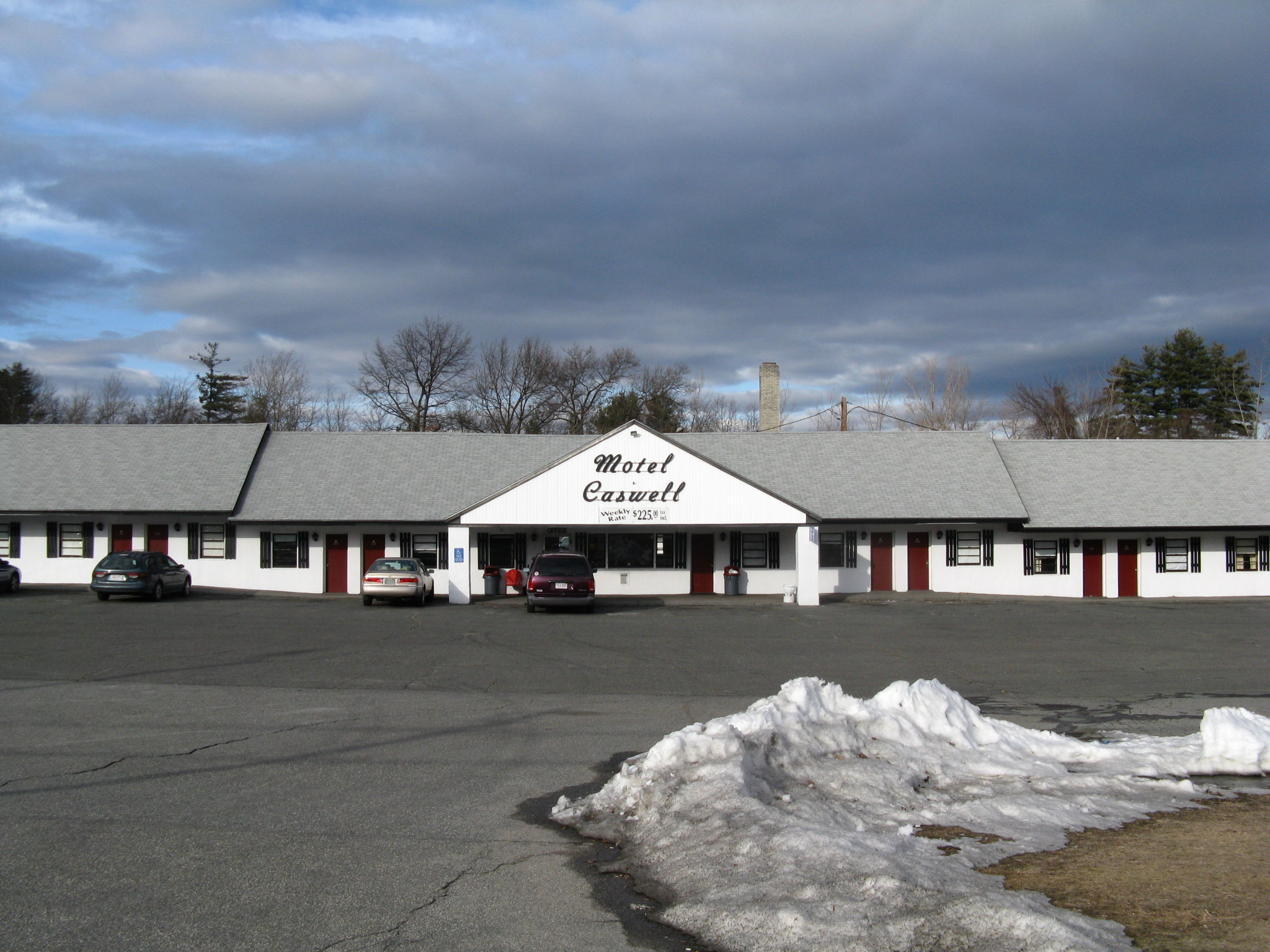
Prosecutors threatened to seize a motel owned by the Caswell family, when there was illegal drug use on the premises, in Tewksbury, Massachusetts.

Police can seize not only cash from cars but real estate such as a person's home. For example, homes have been seized even if someone other than the homeowner on the premises committed drug crimes without the owner's awareness. If the IRS suspects that property is involved with crime, or has been produced as a result of crime, then it has a pretext with which to seize it. From 2010 to 2013, two motel owners were under constant threat of their property being seized after there were incidents of drug selling on the motel premises. A judge ruled in 2013 that the owners could keep their motel since the owners did not know about the illegal activity and took all reasonable steps to prevent it.

I'd like to see this law done away with, or heavily modified ... This law, where you are presumed guilty and have to prove yourself innocent, is completely backward from any other law I've ever heard of. It's hard to believe the government has that kind of power. It's ridiculous. Prosecutors abuse it, and the average person can't afford to fight it.

— Russell Caswell, motel owner, 2013

Police seized a house on the pretext that it was being used for selling drugs, after a couple's son was arrested for selling $40 worth of illegal drugs. In another case, homeowners Carl and Mary Shelden sold their house to a man who was later convicted of fraud, but because of the real estate transaction, the Sheldens got caught up in a 10-year legal battle that left them "virtually bankrupt"; after years, they finally got back their house but it was in badly damaged condition; the Sheldens had done nothing wrong.

=== Seizures of vehicles ===
In Detroit, men suspected of hiring prostitutes had their automobiles seized. An owner's sailboat was taken after he was caught with a negligible amount of marijuana. Members of the Bergen County Prosecutor's Office were charged with fraud after knowingly selling counterfeit goods at an asset forfeiture auction.

=== Seizures of funds in a bank account ===
The government can seize money directly from a bank account. One way this happens is when there are large numbers of cash deposits that government investigators suspect are structured as a way to avoid deposits exceeding $10,000, since deposits greater than that amount must be reported to the federal government. But it can happen that legitimate businesses have regular large deposits of cash. In one instance, the Internal Revenue Service waited for large deposits to be placed into an owner's bank account, and then forced the bank by legal means to surrender it to the agency by means of a secret warrant; authorities took $135,000 from Michigan restaurant owners, named the Cheung family, who made cash deposits from their Chinese restaurant. In another instance, a businessman in New Jersey made repeated cash deposits to save for purchasing a house; each payment was below the $10,000 threshold for reporting to the government, but there were 21 deposits over a period of four months, which caused government to suspect that criminal activity was involved; as a result, the IRS seized $157,000 and the businessman was forced to hire an attorney to get his funds returned. Officials seized $35,000 from the bank account of a grocery store "without any warning or explanation" in 2013.

=== Contested seizures ===
After police and authorities have possession of cash or other seized property, there are two ways in which the seized assets become permanently theirs: first, if a prosecutor can prove that seized assets were connected to criminal activity in a courtroom, or second, if nobody tries to claim the seized assets. What happens in many instances is that the assets revert to police ownership by default. If a victim challenges the seizure, prosecutors sometimes offer to return half of the seized funds as part of a deal in exchange for not suing. Sometimes police, challenged by lawyers or by victims, volunteer to return all of the money provided that the victim promises not to sue police or prosecutors; according to The Washington Post, many victims sign simply to get some or all of their money back. Victims often have "long legal struggles to get their money back". One estimate was that only one percent of federally taken property is ever returned to their former owners.

== Statistics ==
Asset forfeitures, selected years
Year	Total forfeitures	Notes
1986	$93.7 million	DOJ's Asset Forfeiture Fund
2004	$567 million	
2005	$1.25 billion	
2007	$1.58 billion	
2008	$1.6 billion	DOJ Asset Forfeiture Fund took in $1 billion
2010	$2.50 billion	

Statistical evidence suggests a strong upward trend in recent years towards greater seizure activity. In 1986, the Department of Justice's Asset Forfeiture Fund took in $93.7 million; in 2008, it took in $1 billion. Much of this growth happened in the previous decade; one analysis suggested that seizures had grown 600 percent from 2002 to 2012. From 2005 to 2010, government seizures of assets from both criminals as well as innocent citizens went from $1.25 billion to $2.50 billion. In 2012, over $4.4 billion were seized through forfeiture as compared to an estimated $4.7 billion Americans suffered as losses from criminal burglary. Federal authorities seized over $4 billion in 2013 through forfeiture, with some of the money being taken from innocent victims. In 2010, there were 15,000 cases of forfeitures. Over 12 years, agencies have taken $20 billion in cash, securities, other property from drug bosses and Wall Street tycoons as well as "ordinary Americans who have not committed crimes". One estimate was that in 85% of civil forfeiture instances, the property owner was never charged with a crime. In 2010, there were 11,000 noncriminal forfeiture cases. In 2010, claimants challenged 1,800 civil forfeiture seizures in federal court.

== States ==
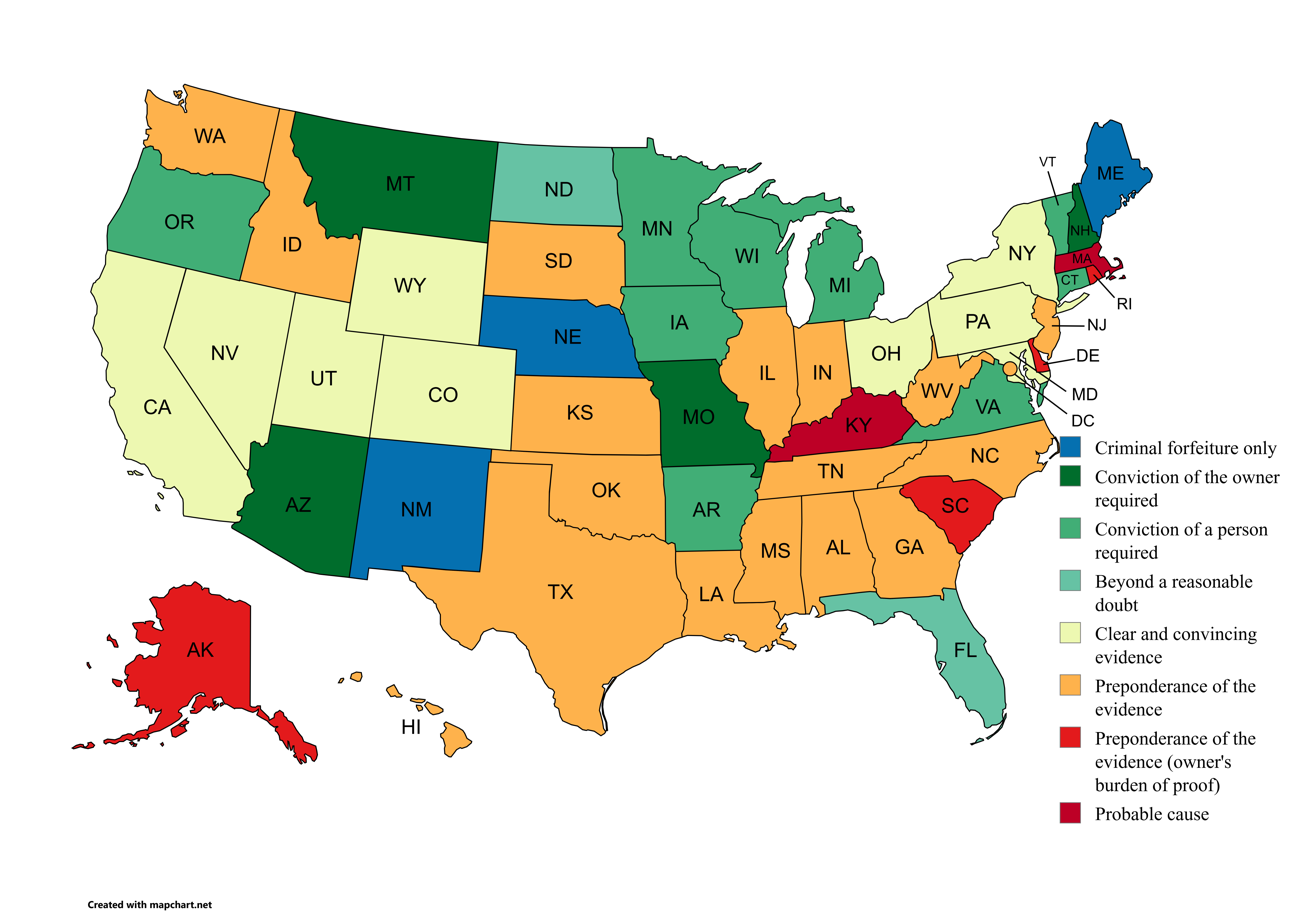

Standards of proof in state forfeiture laws
State	Standard of proof	Innocent owner burden for property recovery	Financial incentive for the government
Alabama	Prosecutors need to prove by preponderance of the evidence that the property is connected to a crime.	Prosecutors need to prove that a 3rd party owner knew about the criminal use of their property.	All proceeds go to law enforcement.
Alaska	Property owner needs to prove by preponderance of the evidence that the property at stake is not connected to a crime.	3rd party owners need to prove their own innocence.	Up to 75% of proceeds go to law enforcement, and 100% for non-monetary property worth $5,000 or less.
Arizona	With limited exceptions, an owner of the property must first be convicted. Then, prosecutors must link to property to the crime by clear and convincing evidence.	Prosecutors need to prove by clear and convincing evidence that a 3rd party owner knew about the criminal use of their property.	34% of proceeds used to pay law enforcement and prosecutor personnel, 3% to community programs and donations, 1% to victim restitution. Attorney General's Office is banned from paying salaries with money in the anti-racketeering fund.
Arkansas	Conviction of "person from whom the property was seized" required, but conviction of the property owner is not required. Requirement can be waived if person does not contest forfeiture or agrees to help investigators in exchange for immunity. Preponderance of the evidence after the conviction provision is met.	3rd party owners need to prove their own innocence.	80% of proceeds up to $250,000 from a single forfeiture go to police and prosecutors 20% to the state's Crime Lab Equipment Fund. Any amount above $250,000 goes to a special non-law enforcement fund.
California	Cash below $40,000: Conviction of "a defendant" required, which may or may not be the owner, but only applies if an owner contests forfeiture. Property must be linked to the crime beyond reasonable doubt after conviction. Cash above $40,000: Clear and convincing evidence if contested. Uncontested forfeiture: Prima facie case that property is subject to forfeiture.	Government must prove that third-party owners knew about criminal activity connected to their property.	65% proceeds go to police, 10% to prosecutors, 1% to fund controlled by a prosecutors’ trade association.
Colorado	Prosecutors required to provide clear and convincing evidence that property is connected to a crime.	Government must prove that third-party owners knew about criminal activity connected to their property.	50% directly to law enforcement, 25% to law enforcement community services fund, 25% to drug rehabilitation programs.
Connecticut	"A person" needs to be convicted in cases involving drugs, identity theft, and sex trafficking. The property owner needs to be convicted for all other crimes. Property must be linked to the crime by clear and convincing evidence following conviction in all cases.	Government must prove that third-party owners knew about criminal activity connected to their property.	59.5% of proceeds go to police and 10% to prosecutors in drug cases. None in all other cases.
Delaware	Property owner needs to prove by preponderance of the evidence that the property at stake is not connected to a crime once seizure happened.	3rd party owners need to prove their own innocence.	Up to 100% of proceeds go to law enforcement.
District of Columbia	Prosecutors required to provide clear and convincing evidence in cases involving motor vehicles, real property or currency up one thousand dollars. Conviction of the owner required when a person's primary residence is at stake. Preponderance of the evidence for cases involving any other property.	Government must prove that third-party owners knew about criminal activity connected to their property.	All proceeds go to the general fund.
Florida	Prosecutor required to prove beyond a reasonable doubt that the property at stake is connected to a crime.	Government must prove that third-party owners knew about criminal activity connected to their property.	Up to 75% of proceeds go to law enforcement. Equitable sharing between state and federal agencies is allowed.
Georgia	Prosecutors required to prove by preponderance of the evidence that the property at stake is connected to a crime.	3rd party owners need to prove their own innocence. In cases involving jointly owned vehicles, innocent owner claims are not allowed.	Up to 100% of proceeds go to law enforcement.
Hawaii	Prosecutors required to prove by preponderance of the evidence that the property at stake is connected to a crime.	3rd party owners need to prove their own innocence.	25% to police, 25% to prosecutors and 50% to the attorney general for law enforcement projects, up to $3 million per year.
Idaho	Prosecutors required to prove by preponderance of the evidence that the property at stake is connected to a crime.	3rd party owners need to prove their own innocence.	Up to 100% of proceeds go to law enforcement.
Illinois	In general, prosecutors are required to prove by preponderance of the evidence. Prosecutors required to provide clear and convincing evidence if a related criminal case results in acquittal or non-indictment. Ban on forfeitures for currency under $100 in non-drug cases, $500 for drug cases.	3rd party owners need to prove their own innocence at pretrial hearings in order to recover the property.	90% of proceeds go to law enforcement.
Indiana	Prosecutors required to prove by preponderance of the evidence that the property at stake is connected to a crime.	3rd party owners need to prove their own innocence, unless the case involves vehicles or recording equipment alleged used in sex crimes, in which case, the government bears the burden of proof.	Up to 93% of proceeds go to law enforcement.
Iowa	Conviction of "a person" required for property valued at or below $5,000, and only applies if the property owner contests forfeiture. Once a person is convicted, the property must be linked to the crime by clear and convincing evidence.	In general, the government must prove third-party owners knew about criminal activity connected to their property, but the owner bears the burden in drug cases involving property valued above $50,000.	All proceeds go to law enforcement.
Kansas	Prosecutors required to prove by preponderance of the evidence that the property at stake is connected to a crime.	3rd party owners need to prove their own innocence.	All proceeds go to law enforcement.
Kentucky	Cases not involving real property: Prosecutors must prove "slight evidence of traceability" to a crime, a standard considered to be akin to probable cause, and the owner must prove by clear and convincing evidence that the property in question is not connected to a crime Cases involving real property: Prosecutors required to provide clear and convincing evidence.	3rd party owners need to prove their own innocence, unless real property is at stake.	85% to the seizing agencies, 15% to the Office of the Attorney General or the Prosecutors Advisory Council.
Louisiana	Prosecutors required to prove by preponderance of the evidence that the property at stake is connected to a crime.	3rd party owners need to prove their own innocence.	60% to the seizing agencies, 20% to the prosecuting district attorneys’ offices, 20% to the criminal court fund.
Maine	Criminal forfeiture only.	3rd party owners need to prove their own innocence, unless a family's primary residence is at stake.	All proceeds go to the General Fund unless another transfer is approved. However, there are allegations that the law is not being followed by law enforcement agencies within the state.
Maryland	Prosecutors required to provide clear and convincing evidence that the property is connected to a crime. When a family's primary residence is at stake, the owner (or owners, if they are a married couple) must be convicted.	Unless the case involves vehicles, real property, or property related to drug transactions, 3rd party owners need to prove their own innocence.	All proceeds go to the state's General Fund, or the General Fund of the local governing body.
Massachusetts	Prosecutors required to show probable cause that the property is connected to a crime.	3rd party owners need to prove their own innocence.	Up to 100% of the proceeds go to law enforcement.
Michigan	Conviction of "a defendant" required. It only applies if the property owner contests forfeiture, and does not apply to cash above $50,000. Once a defendant is convicted, the property must be linked to a drug crime by clear and convincing evidence, or to any other crime via preponderance of the evidence.	The government must prove 3rd party owners knew about criminal activity connected to their property, except in drug cases involving property valued above $50,000, when the owner will bear the burden of proof. But lack of knowledge of the criminal activity has been held not to be a defense. See Bennis v. Michigan.	All proceeds go to law enforcement in drug cases, 75% in other cases.
Minnesota	Conviction of "a person" required. It only applies to judicial forfeitures, requires the property owner to contest the forfeiture if it involves property worth less than $50,000, and does not apply to a person who has agreed to help investigators in a bid to avoid criminal charges. Once a person is convicted, the property must be linked to a drug crime by clear and convincing evidence.	3rd party owners need to prove their own innocence.	90% of proceeds go to law enforcement for all cases not involving prostitution or human trafficking or DWI. All proceeds go to law enforcement in DWI cases, and 60% of proceeds go to law enforcement in cases involving prostitution or human trafficking.
Mississippi	Prosecutors required to prove by preponderance of the evidence that the property at stake is connected to a crime.	The government must prove 3rd party owners knew about criminal activity connected to their property.	80% of proceeds go to law enforcement when only one agency participated in the forfeiture. 100% in all other cases.
Missouri	Conviction of the owner is required, even in cases where the forfeiture is uncontested. Once the owner is convicted, the property must be linked to the crime via preponderance of the evidence.	3rd party owners need to prove their own innocence.	All proceeds are used to fund schools.
Montana	Conviction of the owner is required in criminal proceeding held in conjunction with forfeiture action. Once the owner is convicted, the property must be linked to the crime via clear and convincing evidence.	The government must prove 3rd party owners knew about criminal activity connected to their property.	Up to 100% of proceeds go to law enforcement, but annual proceeds to state agencies above $125,000 are split in half between the general fund and a state forfeiture fund.
Nebraska	Criminal forfeiture only.	3rd party owners need to prove their own innocence.	50% of proceeds go to law enforcement.
Nevada	Prosecutors required to provide clear and convincing evidence that property is connected to a crime.	3rd party owners need to prove their own innocence.	Up to 100% of proceeds go to law enforcement. At the end of the fiscal year, however, 70% of any amount above $100,000 will go to school funding in the judicial district where the property was seized.
New Hampshire	Conviction of the owner required, but owner is required to prove innocence. Legal burden of proof following conviction of the owner is not clear.	3rd party owners need to prove their own innocence.	45% of proceeds go to local law enforcement, up to $225,000 from a single forfeiture, and another 45% to a state drug forfeiture fund. Any amount above $1 million in the state drug forfeiture fund goes to the General Fund.
New Jersey	Criminal conviction required, but only to contested forfeitures of cash worth less than $1,000, or other property worth less than $10,000. Once a conviction is obtained, the property must be linked to the crime via preponderance of the evidence. Forfeiture is precluded if criminal charges related to the property seizure are never filed against a person, or prosecutors fail to establish the person’s criminal culpability.	3rd party owners need to prove their own innocence.	100% of proceeds go to law enforcement when a forfeiture is pursued by local agencies. Number drops to 95% when a forfeiture is pursued by the attorney general.
New Mexico	Criminal forfeiture only.	The government must prove via clear and convincing evidence that 3rd party owners knew about criminal activity connected to their property.	All proceeds, except an amount that is retained to cover various related expenses, go to the General Fund.
New York	In drug cases, prosecutors are required to provide clear and convincing evidence that a crime took place. Beyond that, they must also prove that the property is connected to the crime via preponderance of the evidence. A conviction provision that is described as "very weak" also applies to non-drug cases.	The government must prove that 3rd party owners knew about criminal activity connected to their property.	60% of proceeds go to law enforcement.
North Carolina	Criminal forfeiture only in general, but in cases involving racketeering, prosecutors can pursue civil forfeiture, where they must prove by preponderance of the evidence that the property is connected to a crime.	3rd party owners need to prove their own innocence in racketeering cases	All proceeds are used to fund schools.
North Dakota	Conviction of the property owner is required, but the property owner is required to contest the forfeiture. Conviction provision does not apply if the owner agreed to help investigators in exchange for immunity or a reduced sentence. Once the owner is convicted, the property must be linked to the crime via clear and convincing evidence. If the property at stake can be connected to a crime beyond a reasonable doubt, the conviction provision is waived.	3rd party owners need to prove their own innocence in racketeering cases	All proceeds go to law enforcement, but any amount above $200,000 in the government’s forfeiture account over any two-year budget period will go to the General Fund.
Ohio	Prosecutors required to provide clear and convincing evidence that the property in question is connected to a crime.	3rd party owners need to prove their own innocence, except in cases involving legally titled or registered property, as well as property valued at over $15,000. In those cases, the burden of proof rests with the government.	Up to 100% of proceeds go to law enforcement, 90% for juvenile cases.
Oklahoma	Prosecutors required to prove by preponderance of the evidence that the property at stake is connected to a crime.	3rd party owners need to prove their own innocence.	Up to 100% of proceeds go to law enforcement. Abusive use of forfeiture funds have been documented, including prosecutors using the proceeds to pay off student loans and living in seized houses rent free.
Oregon	Conviction of "a person" required, but this only applies when the property owner contests the forfeiture. Once a person is convicted, the property must be linked to the crime via preponderance of the evidence, and clear and convincing evidence in cases involving real property.	The government must prove that 3rd party owners knew about criminal activity connected to their property, except in cases where cash, weapons or negotiable instruments were found near drugs. In those cases, the burden of proof falls on the owner.	52.5% of proceeds go to law enforcement when local agencies pursued the forfeiture, 47% when the state is pursuing the forfeiture.
Pennsylvania	Prosecutors required to provide clear and convincing evidence that property is connected to a crime.	The government must prove that 3rd party owners knew about criminal activity connected to their property.	All proceeds go to law enforcement.
Rhode Island	Owner of property must prove via preponderance of the evidence that property is not connected to a crime.	3rd party owners need to prove their own innocence.	90% of proceeds go to law enforcement.
South Carolina	Owner of property must prove via preponderance of the evidence that property is not connected to a crime.	3rd party owners need to prove their own innocence.	75% of proceeds go to police, 20% of proceeds go to prosecutors.
South Dakota	Prosecutors required to prove by preponderance of the evidence that the property at stake is connected to a crime.	3rd party owners need to prove their own innocence.	All proceeds go to the state Attorney General's Drug Control Fund. From there, funds are given out to police for drug enforcement efforts.
Tennessee	Prosecutors required to prove by preponderance of the evidence that the property at stake is connected to a crime.	3rd party owners need to prove their own innocence in cases involving vehicles. For all other cases, the government must prove that 3rd party owners knew about criminal activity connected to their property.	Up to 100% of proceeds go to law enforcement.
Texas	Prosecutors required to prove by preponderance of the evidence that the property at stake is connected to a crime.	3rd party owners need to prove their own innocence.	In cases where property is forfeited by default, up to 70% of proceeds go to law enforcement. In cases where forfeiture is contested, up to 100% of proceeds go to law enforcement.
Utah	Prosecutors required to provide clear and convincing evidence that property is connected to a crime.	The government must prove that 3rd party owners knew about criminal activity connected to their property.	All proceeds go to law enforcement.
Vermont	Conviction of "a person" required, but this only applies when the property owner contests the forfeiture. Once a person is convicted, the property must be linked to the crime via clear and convincing evidence.	3rd party owners need to prove their own innocence.	45% of proceeds go to law enforcement.
Virginia	Conviction provision in place, but owner is not required to be convicted, and the provision only applies when the property owner contests the forfeiture. Once the conviction provision is met, the property must be linked to the crime via clear and convincing evidence.	3rd party owners need to prove their own innocence.	90% to the seizing agencies, 10% to the Department of Criminal Justice Services.
Washington	Prosecutors required to prove by preponderance of the evidence that the property at stake is connected to a crime.	3rd party owners need to prove their own innocence.	90% of proceeds go to law enforcement.
West Virginia	Prosecutors required to prove by preponderance of the evidence that the property at stake is connected to a crime.	3rd party owners need to prove their own innocence.	All proceeds go to law enforcement.
Wisconsin	Conviction of "a person" required, but this can be waived by a court if the owner does not contest the forfeiture, or in other situations, such as when the defendant has agreed to help investigators in exchange for immunity. Once a person is convicted, the property must be linked to the crime via clear and convincing.	The government must prove that 3rd party owners knew about criminal activity connected to their property.	All proceeds go to school funding, but agencies can retain up to 50% to pay for related expenses.
Wyoming	Prosecutors required to provide clear and convincing evidence that the property in question is connected to a crime.	3rd party owners need to prove their own innocence.	Up to 100% of proceeds go to law enforcement.

== Reactions ==
=== Proponents ===
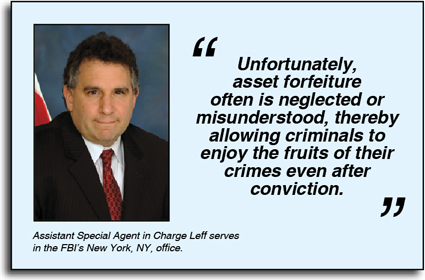
FBI special agent Douglas Leff argues that civil forfeiture is a necessary tool for law enforcement to combat money laundering by criminal operatives.

Proponents argue that civil forfeiture tactics are necessary to help police fight serious crime. It is seen as a vital and powerful weapon in the continuing battle against illegal drugs, and effective at discouraging criminal activity. It makes it easier for law enforcement to fight organized crime when they had trouble imprisoning offenders, since they could deprive them of their property and income when it is much harder to prove their guilt in a court of law.

Prosecutors choose civil forfeiture not because of the standard of proof, but because it is often the only way to confiscate the instrumentalities of crime. The alternative, criminal forfeiture, requires a criminal trial and a conviction. Without civil forfeiture, we could not confiscate the assets of drug cartels whose leaders remain beyond the reach of United States extradition laws and who cannot be brought to trial. Moreover, criminal forfeiture reaches only a defendant's own property. Without civil forfeiture, an airplane used to smuggle drugs could not be seized, even if the pilot was arrested, because the pilot invariably is not the owner of the plane. Nor could law enforcement agencies confiscate cash carried by a drug courier who doesn't own it, or a building turned into a "crack house" by tenants with the knowing approval of the landlord.

— Gerald E. Mcdowell Chief, Asset Forfeiture & Money Laundering Section, Dept. of Justice, 1996, writing in The New York Times

The head of the asset forfeiture section of the Department of Justice said that civil forfeiture of cash from innocents was insignificant compared to the "thousands of traffic stops" that bust major drug money couriers.

What's troubling to you? That a drug trafficker who's bringing money from the U.S. to Mexico, who's carrying hundreds of thousands of millions of dollars in cash in their pickup truck, who just sold dope and crack and cocaine to children in your playgrounds, and his money is being taken away? That troubles you?

— Richard Weber, US Justice Department, 2008

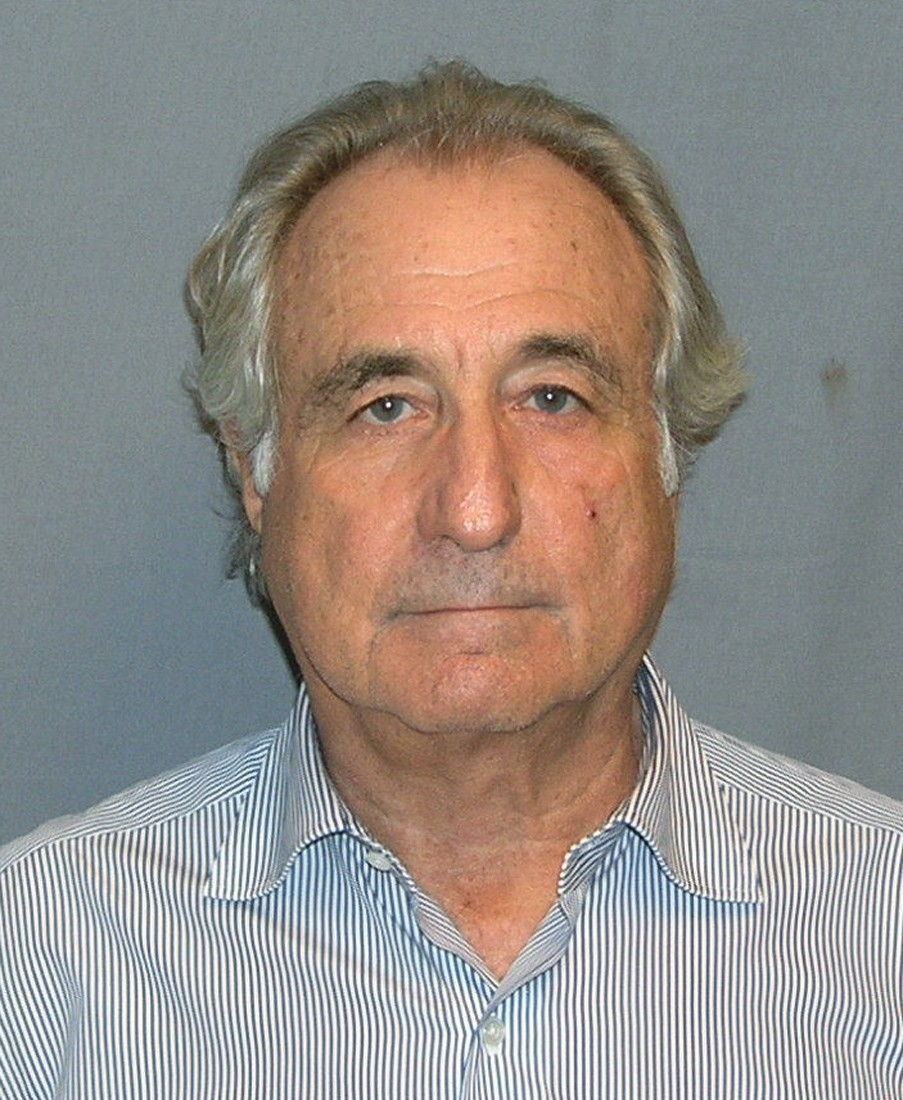
Police used civil forfeiture laws to help return swindled funds to their owners. Photo: Convicted swindler Bernard Madoff.

Civil forfeiture has been used to restore money stolen by fraud and other schemes by corrupt politicians. Civil forfeiture targets cybercrime, fraud, and scams in high finance at Wall Street, and money-laundering on a global scale. It enables police to have sufficient power to "return money to crime victims" in instances of swindling or fraud. Civil forfeiture laws were helpful in enabling authorities to seize and return swindled funds by the Bernard Madoff fraud.

Proponents argue that government has sufficient safeguards in place so that individuals can challenge seizures if the need arises. Justice William H. Rehnquist said in a Supreme Court decision that federal forfeiture in drug-related cases was not a punishment but served nonpunitive purposes such as encouraging people to be careful that their property was not used illegally. A lobbyist for the Maryland State Police named Thomas Williams argued that bills to require police to keep better records of seized property would cost law enforcement more time and money, and that trying to track seizures by multi-agency task forces would not be easy. Proponents say that when claimants contest the seizures, they rarely win back their money, suggesting that the "system is working properly". Proponents say the system is monitored to make sure seizures are properly done. In addition, the funds enable police forces to equip themselves further for more effective crime prevention; for example, a $3.8 million drug bust let officers equip their cars with $1,700 video cameras and heat-sensing equipment for a seven-member force.

=== Critics ===
Critics include citizens, defense attorneys, and advocates for civil rights. They point to serious instances of abuse in which innocent owners have been victimized. Critics are from both sides of the political spectrum, from left-leaning groups such as the American Civil Liberties Union and right-leaning groups such as The Heritage Foundation. The main criticisms of civil forfeiture proceedings are as follows:

- Flawed judicial process. Critics suggest that civil forfeitures are mostly "devoid of due process". Arguments have been made that the seizures violate the Due Process Clause of the Constitution since owners have few means to challenge the seizures. They see some seizures as assaults against individual rights. Critics argue that criminals are treated better in the courts than innocent owners who have property seized, since criminals are often told they have a right to an attorney, and that the beyond a reasonable doubt standard of proof is much higher in criminal trials than in civil trials. Burden of proof is shifted to victims to prove innocence. Victims of civil forfeiture are considered guilty until proven innocent, thereby turning the principle of innocent until proven guilty on its head. Because it is part of the civil justice system, there are no attorneys provided for defendants as can happen in some criminal trials; people who can not afford an attorney have slim chances of recovering their property. Most cases are never heard by a jury or judge since victims are unable to fight the seizures by hiring a lawyer. In contrast to principles of open justice, seizures are often done through sealed documents with a lack of transparency. Clinical law professor Louis Rulli of the University of Pennsylvania said that a piece of property does not have the same rights as a human: no right to an attorney, no presumption of innocence.
- Excessive punishment. Justice John Paul Stevens said in a single dissenting vote in 1996 that civil forfeiture of a house, in which marijuana had been illegally processed, was an example of an excessive fine, and a violation of the Eighth Amendment, although the majority of the court disagreed.
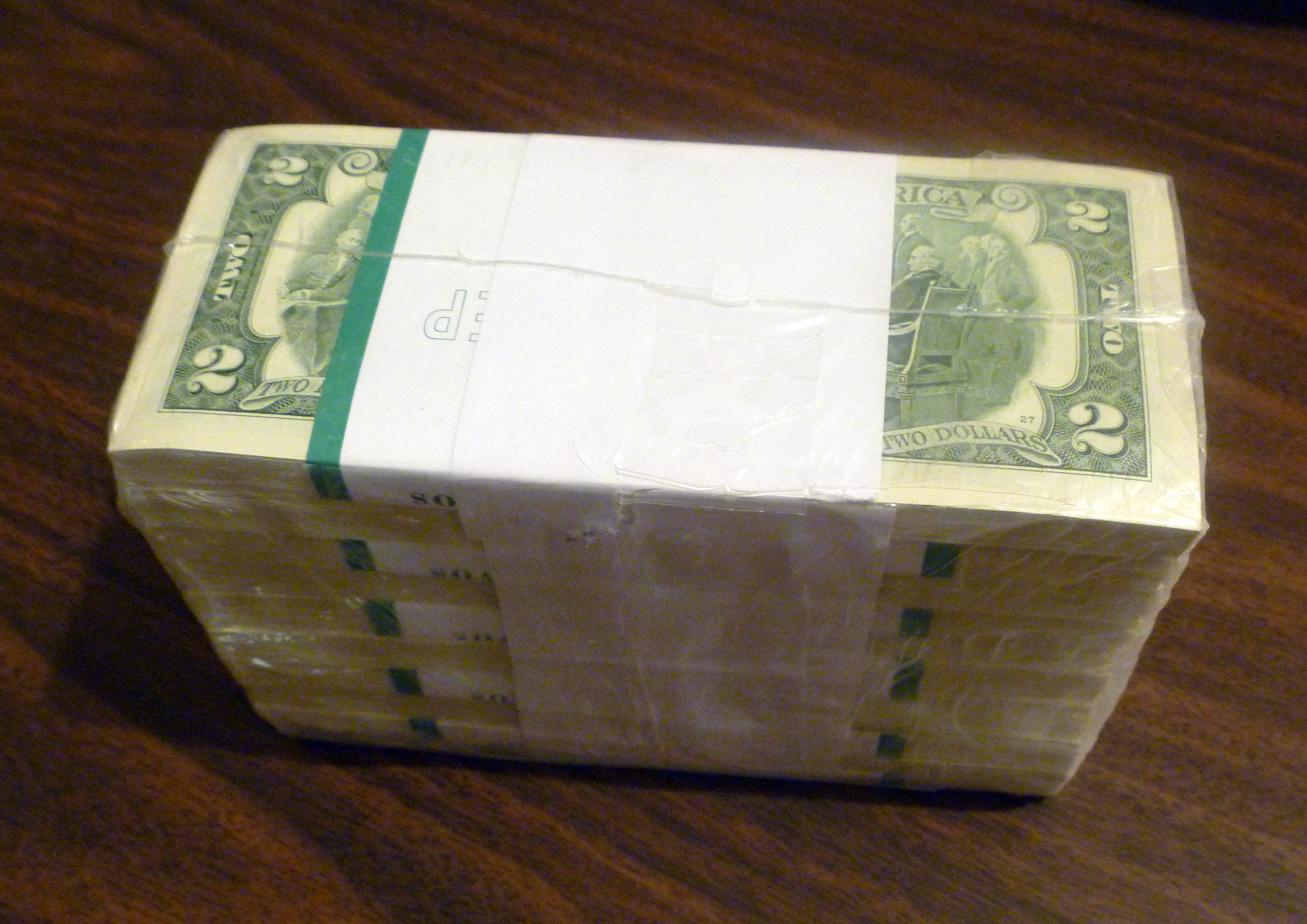
  Critics contend that the lure of cash tempts police towards subverting the rules for personal gain.
- Motivates police misbehavior. Critics contend that the system is set up in a way as to incentivize "perverse behavior" by "predatory government agencies". It makes it possible for government officials to seize property such as cash, vehicles, houses, and jewelry from people without ever convicting them for wrongdoing in a court or even charging them with a crime. The cash and assets are a major temptation for police to presume that activity is illegal. Critics say the huge amount of money involved have a distorting effect on police, such that they are more interested in seizing cash rather than illegal drugs. Seized assets can be used for police office expenses and new equipment such as vehicles. The profit motive, in which police can keep 90% or more of profits, "forms the rotten core of forfeiture abuse". Prosecutors and police have a strong incentive to seize property since the funds can be used to pay expenses of the District Attorney's office, including salaries. Over a ten-year period, the forfeiture money collected was $25 million in Philadelphia, with seized funds being used to pay salaries for people working in the District Attorney's office. When funds are returned to the victim, it can happen that the funds come out of taxpayer money, not out of police funds such as a pension fund. Seized amounts of money have gone for new police equipment, parties, travel expenses, training seminars, sometimes held in distant locations such as Las Vegas or Hawaii. A Texas prosecutor used $25,000 in seized cash to take his office staff including spouses and a judge on a vacation to Hawaii. There are no penalties for wrongful seizures, particularly when taxpayers pay when ill-gotten gains from innocent citizens must be returned, so there is an incentive to "find" a drug-related issue when police come across cash. The incentives work against police seizing drugs but push them to seize cash instead:
  If a cop stops a car going north with a trunk full of cocaine, that makes great press coverage, makes a great photo. Then they destroy the cocaine ... If they catch 'em going south with a suitcase full of cash, the police department just paid for its budget for the year.
  — Jack Fishman, former IRS agent, criminal defense attorney, 2008
- Innocent owners ensnared. Critics argue that innocent owners suffer emotionally and financially.
- Difficult to challenge seizures. The process forces property owners with limited financial abilities to have to hire attorneys and take time and money simply to "prove their innocence". Victims must actively fight to recover their seized property; if they do nothing, or wait, then they will lose everything. If victims do not seek help from sympathetic lawyers such as those of the Institute for Justice, they can sometimes be offered to have a fraction of their property returned as part of a deal; critics have described the IRS as "bullies" practicing "extortion" against innocent citizens. Procedures to get money back are often fraught with difficulty. Retrieving seized property can be a "bureaucratic nightmare" where victims meet not with a judge or jury but with a prosecutor.
- Arbitrary punishments. Critics suggest that civil forfeitures can be arbitrary, varying significantly from one case to another; for example, Alan Finder in The New York Times wondered whether it was "fair that one driver loses a car worth $45,000 and another loses one worth $700", if each situation resulted from drunk driving arrests.
- Unfairly targets poor and politically weak persons. Many victims of civil forfeiture are "poor and politically weak" and unable to mount a sustained battle in the courts to get their property returned. Writer Angelica Werth points out that "Because these are civil cases, not criminal cases, an individual wishing to reclaim his property is not assigned a public defender—he must hire his own legal defense. The average cost of hiring a lawyer for this type of case is about $3,000, but the median amount taken (across states with available data) is $1,276."
- Subverts state law. Local and state police often cooperate with federal authorities in what has been called equitable sharing agreements. Since many states have laws restricting or limiting civil forfeitures, as well as requiring higher standards of proof before property can be taken, local police can sidestep these rules by treating the suspected criminal activity as a federal crime, and bringing in federal authorities. As a result, after the seizure, local and federal agencies share the proceeds with 10% to 20% of it going to the federal agency and the remainder to the local police force. Accordingly, equitable sharing "effectively subverts the will and intent of the state legislatures" and has been criticized by prominent civil rights attorney and property rights advocate Scott Bullock as being a "complete violation" of the principle of federalism.
- Extent of abuse. Proponents and critics differ about the extent of cases in which innocent persons had their property seized. Proponents argue that the cases are few in number, while critics contend that many instances of abuse happen without awareness by the public as a result of the signing of waivers, victims not challenging seizures for lack of knowledge, and other reasons related to a general lack of judicial transparency. The Baltimore Sun made reports that in 2012, half of victims with seized assets were not convicted of a crime.

=== Efforts at reform ===
There have been numerous reports in the media about systemic abuse of civil forfeiture. USA Today described it as "an increasingly common—and utterly outrageous—practice that can amount to legalized theft by police". Reporter Sarah Stillman writing in The New Yorker interviewed numerous police officers, lawyers, prosecutors, justices and plaintiffs around the United States and found that many had reservations that innocent Americans were being abused. The New Yorker published a "sprawling investigation" about how cities abuse civil forfeiture to "bolster their cash-strapped coffers by seizing the assets of the poor, often on trumped up charges". Comedian and political commentator John Oliver devoted a presentation to a satirical exposure of civil forfeiture in 2014.

Organizations working for reform, as well as helping individual victims, include the Institute for Justice, a libertarian nonprofit law firm in Washington, D.C., which works to end civil forfeiture abuse. It has helped numerous clients recover property seized by the government. The Institute of Justice is helping one forfeiture victim sue the federal district court as well as the mayor, district attorney, and police commissioner in Philadelphia. Scott Bullock, senior attorney at the Institute for Justice, advocates that civil forfeiture should be abolished except for use in enforcing maritime and customs laws, and require that any seizures be linked to criminal convictions of specific people. If that is not possible, Bullock recommends that seized revenues be placed in neutral funds such as drug treatment efforts, that standards of proof for law enforcement be raised to ensure that police provide "clear and convincing evidence" of wrongdoing, that the burden of proof should be moved to government to prove wrongdoing, that seized assets should be tracked such that information is easily accessible by the public, and that the equitable sharing arrangement be abolished. Sometimes victims turn to the American Civil Liberties Union (ACLU) for legal assistance in winning back their seized property.

There has been opposition to civil forfeiture in some lower courts. There have been attempts by lawmakers to introduce legislation to prevent abuses based on civil forfeiture procedures; one proposal was to raise the standard of proof necessary before property could be seized, and require government to prove that an owner of property was involved in an illegal criminal activity before such seizures could happen. There have been class action lawsuits against authorities, such as one in East Texas by black and Latino drivers; the suit alleges that police took $3 million from 2006 to 2008 in 140 separate incidents. One reform effort is to require authorities to keep better records about seized assets.

In 2015, the New Mexico legislature outlawed civil forfeiture. Also in 2015 a number of criminal justice reformers, including the Koch family foundations and the ACLU, announced plans to advocate the reduction of asset forfeitures due to the disproportionate penalty it places on low-income wrongdoers; the forfeiture of private property in such cases often results in the deprivation of the majority of an individual's wealth.

As civil forfeiture may not be allowed, a new practice has emerged: By classifying valuables such as cars, cellphones, and wallets with cash as evidence, the police can keep them and make it very difficult and time consuming to get them back. The police can sell the items after 120 days.

=== Marijuana legalization and forfeiture ===
The Drug Enforcement Administration (DEA) has been using civil forfeiture as one way of funding their efforts to combat the use of illegal drugs, including marijuana, which continues to be illegal to possess under Federal law as of 2019. According to government figures, the DEA collected $18 million in 2013 as part of its Cannabis Eradication Program. There have been occasions where police involved in a traffic stop claim they smell marijuana in order to get probable cause to search a vehicle without a warrant and start civil forfeiture proceedings. Proponents in favor of legalizing marijuana have objected to this practice, which includes DEA seizures of properties in which marijuana is used and sold. A bill has been proposed in the United States Congress to eliminate this source of funding. As more states progress towards legalizing marijuana for medical use and for recreational use, there are more businesses to sell marijuana, sometimes called dispensaries or "weed shops". A report in The Guardian in 2015 suggested that such shops operated in a "tricky gray zone", so that even in the 23 states where medicinal cannabis is legal, such dispensaries can be "wiped out by a single visit from law enforcement". While state law may recognize such establishments as having a legal purpose, federal law does not recognize this, and conflicting interpretations can emerge, which can result in properties being confiscated. It has sparked controversy and, in some instances, public outrage.

== See also ==
- Confiscation
- Killing of Donald Scott
- Legal plunder
- Nebraska v. One 1970 2-Door Sedan Rambler (Gremlin)
- United States v. Schooner Peggy
