= Tenaha, Texas asset forfeiture controversy =

Between 2006 and 2008, in Tenaha, Texas, the Tenaha Marshal's Office used state forfeiture regulations to seize property from nearly 200 motorists. In about 50 of the cases, suspects were charged with drug possession. But in 147 incidents, marshals seized cash, jewelry, cell phones, and automobiles even though no contraband was found, and the motorists were not charged with any crime. Many of those stopped were African-American or Latino drivers. At least 150 motorists had property seized by the Tenaha marshal's office, totaling more than US$3 million.

Examples of seizures from non-whites included:

1. A mixed-race family of four traveling through Tenaha was pulled over by marshals for a moving violation. Officers found no contraband but seized $6,037 after a search. The marshals and the district attorney threatened to take the two children away from the parents and place them in Child Protective Services if they refused to hand over the cash. Tenaha marshals eventually returned the family's money without an apology. The parents are now plaintiffs in a federal class action lawsuit.
2. Linda Dorman, a great-grandmother from Akron, Ohio, had $4,000 taken from her by local authorities when she was stopped while driving through town after visiting Houston in April 2007. Court records make no mention of anything illegal being found in her van. Dorman sued for the return of her money, which she said constituted her life savings.
3. Javier Flores and William Parsons were traveling through Tenaha on July 22, 2008, when police stopped them for speeding. Both men were arrested, and $8,400 was seized after a police dog allegedly detected drugs in the vehicle, although no contraband was found. The pair were then threatened with money laundering charges unless they forfeited the money. Both men were then released from custody without charge.
4. Two men had $50,000 seized even though court records show there was no evidence to indicate the cash was related in any way to criminal enterprise or that the men were engaged in any illegal activity.

The town used the proceeds from the seizures to build a new marshal's office and personally reward officers who took the most money from drivers. Other purchases included a $524 popcorn machine and $195 for candy. Donations to Little League teams and local chambers of commerce were also made using seized funds. Under Texas law, forfeited money can only be used for official purposes by district attorney offices and for law-enforcement purposes by police departments. Lynda Russell, Tenaha's district attorney, has denied any impropriety. However, the US Attorney for the Eastern District of Texas re-prosecuted drug offenders after officials in Tenaha and Shelby County gave known traffickers lenient sentences in exchange for cash forfeitures. In 2008, Shelby County was investigated by the Department of Justice's civil rights division over an allegation made by its former auditor that seized funds had been used for campaign materials in local elections.

== Class action lawsuit ==
In July 2008, 10 plaintiffs filed suit in federal court against Tenaha and Shelby county officials, alleging that police officers had stopped them without cause and unjustly seized their property. The plaintiffs allege that officers threatened them with criminal prosecution if they did not cooperate. Officials named in the suit included Tenaha mayor George Bowers, deputy city marshal Barry Washington, and Shelby County district attorney Lynda Kay Russell. Texas State Senator John Whitmire stated, "If used properly, it's a good law-enforcement tool to see that crime doesn't pay. But in this instance, where people are being pulled over, and their property is taken with no charges filed and no convictions, I think that's theft."

By March 2009, the plaintiff's attorney, Timothy Garrigan, sought class-action status for the lawsuit, citing similar reports from other alleged victims. In response, the Tenaha marshals said they would return at least one man's seized possessions, valued at around $8,500. In August 2011, a judge agreed the case could move forward as a class action because it was part of a larger legal battle "to stop illegal search and seizures and questionable 'interdiction' programs".

In late 2012, the ACLU announced a settlement in the case, under which police must now observe rigorous rules during traffic stops in Tenaha and Shelby County: traffic stops will be videotaped, and the officer must give reason for the stop and suspicion of criminal activity. Drivers are to be advised that they can refuse a search, and dogs will no longer be used to conduct traffic stops. Property determined to have been taken improperly must be returned within 30 business days. Also, asset forfeiture revenue from traffic stops must be donated to non-profit organizations or used for the officer training required by the settlement.

== See also ==
- Civil forfeiture in the United States
