= Timbs v. Indiana =

- Supreme Court of the United States

Argued November 28, 2018 Decided February 20, 2019
- Full case name: Tyson Timbs v. State of Indiana
- Docket no.: 17-1091
- Citations: 586 U.S. 146 (more) 139 S. Ct. 682; 203 L. Ed. 2d 11
- Argument: Oral argument
- Decision: Opinion

Case history
- Prior: State v. Timbs, 62 N.E.3d 472 (Ind. Ct. App. 2016); reversed, 84 N.E.3d 1179 (Ind. 2017); cert. granted, 138 S. Ct. 2650 (2018).

Holding
- The Eighth Amendment's Excessive Fines Clause is an incorporated protection applicable to the States pursuant to the Fourteenth Amendment's Due Process Clause.

Court membership
- Chief Justice John Roberts Associate Justices Clarence Thomas · Ruth Bader Ginsburg; Stephen Breyer · Samuel Alito; Sonia Sotomayor · Elena Kagan; Neil Gorsuch · Brett Kavanaugh

Case opinions
- Majority: Ginsburg, joined by Roberts, Breyer, Alito, Sotomayor, Kagan, Gorsuch, Kavanaugh
- Concurrence: Gorsuch
- Concurrence: Thomas (in judgment)

Laws applied
- U.S. Const. amend. VIII, XIV

Timbs v. Indiana, 586 U.S. 146 (2019), was a United States Supreme Court case in which the Court considered whether the excessive fines clause of the Constitution's Eighth Amendment applies to state and local governments.

In February 2019, the Court unanimously ruled that the Eighth Amendment's prohibition of excessive fines is an incorporated protection applicable to the states under the Fourteenth Amendment.

== Legal background ==
As formulated, the United States Bill of Rights was meant to restrict the power of only the federal government, not the state or local governments, which was confirmed by the US Supreme Court in Barron v. Baltimore (1833). Following the American Civil War, however, the states ratified the Fourteenth Amendment which included the Due Process Clause, "[N]or shall any State deprive any person of life, liberty, or property, without due process of law". Since the Fourteenth Amendment's ratification, the United States Supreme Court has followed the doctrine of incorporation, under which most of the rights secured by the Bill of Rights must be respected, not just by the federal government, but by states and their localities, as well. The Court has carved out only specific exceptions to the doctrine for certain judicial procedural matters. However, the Supreme Court has never made a judgment broadly related to incorporation towards all parts of the Constitution; what Constitutional rights are incorporated against the states has been set by specific cases, and, until Timbs, the Court had yet to rule specifically on the Eighth Amendment's excessive fines clause.

In more recent years, the question whether the Eighth Amendment's protection against excessive fines applies to state and local laws had been highlighted by the growing use of asset forfeiture, a tactic used since the start of the war on drugs in the mid-1970s to seize cash and material property used in illegal drug transactions. Cash assets are used to help fund law enforcement departments, but it has been found that seized assets like vehicles and homes are sometimes used for personal gain by law enforcers. It has been argued that the use of asset forfeiture is imbalanced against poor people, who are more likely to be caught in drug trafficking and have the fewest assets to lose, and makes it difficult for such people to reintegrate with society without these assets.

The Supreme Court previously ruled in Austin v. United States (1993) that the Eighth Amendment's Excessive Fines Clause applies to federal asset forfeitures protecting citizens from excessive fines that would include asset forfeiture. The Court had not, however, squarely addressed whether the Excessive Fines Clause protected against fines imposed by states and municipalities or only against those imposed by the federal government.

== Case background ==
Tyson Timbs of Indiana received a cash sum of money from his father's life insurance company upon his father's death in late 2012. Of the money, Timbs used about $42,000 to purchase a Land Rover. Soon after, Timbs—who had struggled with drug addiction for several years—fell back to drugs following his father's death and spent much of the remaining sum on illegal drug purchases for personal use. Undercover officers asked Timbs to sell them a small amount of heroin, which he did on two occasions in early 2013. The total quantity of drugs sold to the agents amounted to approximately four grams, bought for less than $500. Timbs was arrested in May 2013, and he ultimately pleaded guilty to one count of dealing. Following his guilty pleas, he was sentenced to a year of house arrest, five years of probation, and $1,200 in fees and costs, which he paid. The State of Indiana, however, also used their forfeiture law to confiscate the Land Rover through a civil lawsuit, alleging that Timbs had used the vehicle to transport the drugs. Following his year of house arrest, Timbs found it difficult to reintegrate into society without a vehicle; though he ultimately found a job that accepted his criminal history, it required him to borrow a family member's car to make the commute.

The trial judge in Timbs' civil forfeiture case ruled in 2015 that forfeiting his vehicle violated the Eighth Amendment's prohibition against excessive fines. The Indiana Court of Appeals agreed with this ruling on appeal from the state.

At the Indiana Supreme Court, however, the decision was reversed. The court maintained that the Excessive Fines Clause applied only against the federal government and did not prohibit state or local actors from imposing excessive fines. Given the "lack of clear direction from the Supreme Court," the court "decline[d] to find or assume incorporation" and held that the Excessive Fines Clause has no application to the states.

== Supreme Court ==
Represented by the Institute for Justice, Timbs petitioned the US Supreme Court to hear his case, focused on answering the question whether the "excessive fines" of the Eighth Amendment apply to state and local governments through the Fourteenth Amendment. The Court accepted the case in June 2018. Timbs's case received bipartisan support. Among those filing amicus briefs in support of Timbs included the American Civil Liberties Union, the NAACP Legal Defense and Educational Fund, the National Association of Criminal Defense Lawyers, Judicial Watch, and Pacific Legal Foundation. The United States Chamber of Commerce also filed a brief in support, arguing that just as individuals are harmed by unreasonable asset seizure, companies often end up incurring large fines under state and local laws for small violations.

Oral arguments were heard on November 28, 2018. Observers believed that on the constitutional question, the Justices weighed heavily in favor of asserting that the excessive fines clause was another right that should be incorporated to states. However, these observers also believed that while the question did favor Timbs's case, the Court appeared to be ready to vacate the Indiana Supreme Court decision which let the court determine in the first instance if the forfeiture of Timbs' vehicle would be an excessive fine. This was the outcome Timbs argued for.

The Court issued its decision on February 20, 2019, unanimously stating that the Eighth Amendment's protection from excessive fines was incorporated against the states. The opinion was written by Justice Ruth Bader Ginsburg with all but Clarence Thomas joining, stating that the Eighth Amendment is incorporated to states under the Due Process Clause of the Fourteenth Amendment. Ginsburg's opinion referred to the protection from excessive fines as a key right as early as Magna Carta, and that this protection "has been a constant shield throughout Anglo-American history: Exorbitant tolls undermine other constitutional liberties". Justice Thomas wrote an opinion concurring in the judgment that protection from excessive fines is incorporated, but did not accept that the Due Process Clause was the right constitutional reason for this but generally as part of Privileges or Immunities Clause defined by the Fourteenth Amendment. Justice Neil Gorsuch, though joining on the majority opinion, also wrote a similar concurring opinion, stating that the incorporation might be best analyzed through the Privileges or Immunities Clause. The Court vacated the Indiana Supreme Court's decision, and remanded Timbs' case for further consideration.

The Supreme Court did not offer any tests in their opinions as to how to measure when fines are deemed excessive, a matter that is expected to require additional case law to establish. Ginsburg's opinion did suggest that the seizure of Timbs's Land Rover was disproportionate to the crime, but this was to be resolved by the lower court.

== Subsequent events ==
Following the U.S. Supreme Court's decision, the Indiana Supreme Court reheard the case in June 2019 and issued a ruling in October 2019 that largely adopted Timbs' proposed standard for determining when a forfeiture is unconstitutionally excessive. The court then remanded the case to the trial court in Grant County to hold a new trial on excessiveness under the new standard. Timbs's case was reheard by the Grant County Superior Court, in February 2020. Two months later, the court ruled in Timbs's favor for a second time. "After taking into account the harshness of the punishment, the severity of the offense and [Timbs'] culpability," the court determined "by a significant margin, that Timbs has overcome his burden to establish that the harshness of the forfeiture of his 2013 Land Rover is grossly disproportional to the gravity of the underlying dealing offense and his culpability for the Land Rover's corresponding criminal use."

The State appealed the decision, back to the Indiana Supreme Court, marking the third time that court had considered the forfeiture's constitutionality. In the interim, the State agreed to return the vehicle to Timbs on the condition that he would not sell it or give it away as the case continued in court.

On this third appeal, the Indiana Supreme Court, affirmed in a 4–1 decision the trial court's' rulings that the forfeiture was unconstitutional. Likening the State's forfeiture action to Captain Ahab's pursuit of Moby Dick, the majority wrote that, "today, we reject the State's request to overturn precedent, as there is no compelling reason to deviate from stare decisis and the law of the case; and we conclude that Timbs met his burden to show gross disproportionality, rendering the Land Rover's forfeiture unconstitutional."

== Impact ==
The U.S. Supreme Court's ruling is expected to affect the use of civil forfeiture at state and local levels, a common practice to help partially fund police forces. There is also speculation by supporters of criminal justice reform that the decision may affect the use of confiscation of driver's licenses to compel payment of fines and fees, as well as imprisoning those unable to pay bail or fines for otherwise minor crimes.

The Supreme Court granted certiorari to Jouppi v. Alaska to hear in its 2026 term. In Jouppi, a bush pilot had his $95,000 plane seized by Alaska as forfeiture when the state found he had transported a six-pack of beer carried by one of his passengers, despite having paid the $1500 fine and served three days in jail for the misdemeanor, which otherwise carried a maximum $10,000 fine. The Alaska Supreme Court affirmed the forfeit of the plane based on the maximum possible fine rather than the fine he was actually given. The case asks the question of which metric should be used to evaluate when a fine is considered excessive.

== See also ==
- Nebraska v. One 1970 2-Door Sedan Rambler (Gremlin)
