= Tyler v. Hennepin County =

- Supreme Court of the United States

Argued April 26, 2023 Decided May 25, 2023
- Full case name: Geraldine Tyler, on behalf of herself and all others similarly situated v. Hennepin County, and Daniel P. Rogan, Auditor-Treasurer, in his official capacity
- Docket no.: 22-166
- Citations: 598 U.S. 631 (more)
- Argument: Oral argument
- Opinion announcement: Opinion announcement

Case history
- Prior: Motion to dismiss granted, 505 F.Supp.3d 879 (D. Minn. 2020). Affirmed, 26 F.4th 789 (8th Cir. 2022). Cert. granted (Jan 13, 2023).
- Subsequent: Vacated and remanded (8th Cir. 2023). Remanded to Ramsey Cnty. Dist. Ct. (D. Minn. 2023).

Questions presented
- 1. Whether taking and selling a home to satisfy a debt to the government, and keeping the surplus value as a windfall, violates the Takings Clause?; 2. Whether the forfeiture of property worth far more than needed to satisfy a debt plus, interest, penalties, and costs, is a fine within the meaning of the Eighth Amendment?

Holding
- The retention of the excess value of a home above a person's tax debt violates the Takings Clause of the Fifth Amendment.

Court membership
- Chief Justice John Roberts Associate Justices Clarence Thomas · Samuel Alito; Sonia Sotomayor · Elena Kagan; Neil Gorsuch · Brett Kavanaugh; Amy Coney Barrett · Ketanji Brown Jackson

Case opinions
- Majority: Roberts, joined by unanimous
- Concurrence: Gorsuch, joined by Jackson

Laws applied
- U.S. Const. amends. V, XIV, Minn. Stat. §§ 280.29, 280.41, 282.08

Tyler v. Hennepin County, 598 U.S. 631 (2023), was a United States Supreme Court case about government seizure of property for unpaid taxes, when the value of the property seized is greater than the tax debt. A unanimous court held that the surplus value is protected by the Fifth Amendment's Takings Clause.

Geraldine Tyler owed $15,000 in property taxes and other associated costs. Hennepin County, Minnesota foreclosed on her condominium, sold it for $40,000, and kept all of the money.

Tyler sued the county, arguing that the $25,000 surplus home equity value was property that the county took away from her in violation of the Fifth Amendment and Eighth Amendment. The district court dismissed the case, ruling in favor of the county on all of Tyler's claims, and the United States Court of Appeals for the Eighth Circuit affirmed. Tyler petitioned to the Supreme Court, which agreed to review the case.

The case was filed in 2019 as a class action by attorneys Charles Watkins, Garrett Blanchfield, Vildan Teske, and Roberta Yard.

On appeal, Christina Martin, an attorney with the Pacific Legal Foundation, joined Tyler's attorneys and represented Tyler as well as Kevin Fair, who had a similar case before the Supreme Court.

== Background ==
In 1999, Geraldine Tyler purchased a condominium in North Minneapolis. For a decade, she lived in the condo and paid taxes on the property. In 2010, after a frightening altercation with a neighbor, Tyler sought to move into a safer community. Subsequently, she neglected to pay property taxes on her North Minneapolis condo.

In 2015, after years of property tax delinquency, Hennepin County seized Tyler's condo, foreclosed on it, and sold it for $40,000. Tyler had accrued a tax bill of $2,300 on the property, in addition to $13,200 of associated interest, fines, and penalties. Hennepin County retained all of the profits of the sale (about $25,000) and returned none of it to Tyler, pursuant to Minnesota law.

In 2019, Tyler filed a class action alleging that the taking of property worth far more than was needed to relieve a tax debt and retaining the profits violated the Takings Clause of the Fifth Amendment, the Excessive Fines Clause of the Eighth Amendment, and substantive due process. Tyler's case was dismissed by the district court in December 2020. On appeal, the United States Court of Appeals for the Eighth Circuit affirmed the judgment of the lower court.

On August 19, 2022, Tyler petitioned the Supreme Court to hear her case. The court granted certiorari on January 13, 2023. It handed down the decision on May 25, 2023.

== Supreme Court opinions ==
Chief Justice Roberts delivered a unanimous opinion for the court in which he addresses the first question on which the justices granted review (relating to the Takings Clause). At oral arguments, Tyler argued that if the court ruled in her favor on her the first question, then they need not decide the second question, on whether she has also alleged an excessive fine under the Eighth Amendment. Justice Gorsuch authored an opinion concurring in the court's judgment, but going further as to criticize the Eighth Circuit's reasoning in dismissing Tyler's Eighth Amendment claim.

=== Roberts's majority opinion ===
Roberts's opinion consists of three parts. First, he argues that Tyler suffered a financial harm following the county's refusal to return to her the surplus equity of her home. Next, he argues that Tyler has sufficiently alleged a violation of the Takings Clause. Lastly, he rejects the county's argument that Tyler had relinquished any interest in the surplus equity in her home due to her failure to pay property taxes.

In its arguments, Hennepin County argued that Tyler lacked standing to sue. To bring a takings claim, a plaintiff must state an injury that is attributable to the defendant's conduct and that is redressable by the court. It alleged that Tyler failed to "disclaim the existence of other debts or encumbrances" on her home worth more than the $25,000 surplus. However, the county also failed to prove the existence of any such debts or encumbrances. And even if it had, Tyler would still plausibly allege a financial harm — the county had taken $25,000 that belonged to Tyler. Had any such debts existed, she could have used the excess proceeds from the sale to reduce such liability.

Roberts next addresses the history regarding practices like those undertaken by Hennepin County here — namely, the taking of more than what is owed to satisfy a debt. He states:

The principle that a government may not take more from a taxpayer than she owes can trace its origins at least as far back as Runnymeade in 1215, where King John swore in the Magna Carta that when his sheriff or bailiff came to collect any debts owed him from a dead man, they could remove property “until the debt which is evident shall be fully paid to us; and the residue shall be left to the executors to fulfil the will of the deceased.”

— Tyler v. Hennepin County, 598 U.S. 631, 639

He cites other cases from English law and American Colonial Law establishing the consensus that the government may not take more than it was owed to satisfy a debt, and states that that consensus "held true through the passage of the Fourteenth Amendment." Additionally, he says, this consensus remains true at the time of writing, as 36 states and the Federal Government require the excess value to be returned to the taxpayer.

Roberts states that Hennepin County failed to cite a case in which property tax delinquency was sufficient for abandonment, which would require the surrender, relinquishment, or disclaimer of all property rights. Minnesota's tax forfeiture scheme, he argues, gives no weight to the taxpayer's use of the property, as a homeowner could continue to live in their house for years after defaulting on their taxes before the government sells it.

=== Gorsuch's concurring opinion ===
Gorsuch's opinion raises concerns about how lower courts had ruled against Tyler in her Eighth Amendment claim. The District Court had ruled that Minnesota's tax-forfeiture scheme was not "punitive" because its primary purpose was to compensate the county for the lost revenue resulting from unpaid taxes. However, quoting Austin v. United States, Gorsuch counters that the Excessive Fines Clause applies to statutory schemes that serve in part to punish. The lower court had also argued that the scheme in question could not be punitive since it would confer a windfall on homeowners whose tax bill exceeded the value of the property. Gorsuch responds:

That observation may be factually true, but it is legally irrelevant. Some prisoners better themselves behind bars; some addicts credit court-ordered rehabilitation with saving their lives. But punishment remains punishment all the same. Of course, no one thinks that an individual who profits from an economic penalty has a winning excessive-fines claim. But nor has this Court ever held that a scheme producing fines that punishes some individuals can escape constitutional scrutiny merely because it does not punish others.

— Tyler, 598 U.S., at 649 (Gorsuch, J., concurring)

Lastly, Gorsuch argues against the county's claim that since Minnesota's tax-forfeiture scheme does not condition the loss of surplus equity on a criminal conviction (or even on criminal behavior), it is therefore not punitive. Quoting United States v. Bajakajian, Gorsuch counters that the Court has said that such a scheme may still be punitive where it serves another “goal of punishment,” such as deterrence, and that the District Court approved the Minnesota tax-forfeiture scheme on the grounds that "the ultimate possibility of loss of property serves as a deterrent to those taxpayers considering tax delinquency". In any other context, he says, a statutory scheme that imposes a monetary penalty in order to deter willful noncompliance with the law would readily be identified as a fine, and that:

[T]he Constitution has something to say about [fines]: They cannot be excessive.

— Tyler, 598 U.S., at 650 (Gorsuch, J., concurring).

== See also ==
- Austin v. United States (1993), a case about the Eighth Amendment and forfeiture
- United States v. Bajakajian (1998), another Eighth Amendment forfeiture case
