= Killing of Donald Scott =

1992 police raid in Ventura County, California U.S.

Donald P. Scott was a 61-year-old man who lived on a ranch in a remote part of Ventura County, California, in the Santa Monica Mountains, who was fatally shot during a police raid on October 2, 1992. The officers were attempting to serve a warrant to search his ranch for marijuana. When the officers forcibly entered his home, Scott emerged from his bedroom with a revolver because he heard his wife shouting "don't shoot me" and was then shot while lowering his gun as he was ordered to do by police. No marijuana plants or other evidence of drug sales were found on the property. An official inquiry later suggested that the agents hoped they could seize his property by use of asset forfeiture.

== The raid ==
Early on the morning of October 2, 1992, 31 officers from the Los Angeles County Sheriff's Department, Drug Enforcement Administration, Border Patrol, California National Guard and National Park Service entered the Scott's 200-acre (0.81 km^{2}) ranch. They planned to arrest Scott for allegedly running a 4,000-plant marijuana plantation. When he emerged at the top of the stairs, holding his gun over his head, the officers told him to lower the gun. As he did, they shot him to death. According to the official report, the gun was pointed at the officers when they shot him.

Despite a subsequent search of Scott's ranch using helicopters, dogs, searchers on foot, and a high-tech Jet Propulsion Laboratory device for detecting trace amounts of sinsemilla, no marijuana—or any other illegal drug—was found.

== Aftermath ==
Scott and his wife, Frances Plante-Scott, had only been married for two months at the time of the incident. His body was cremated and the ashes were given to his widow. The ashes were later destroyed when the ranch home was burned in a wildfire the following year.

Scott's widow, along with four of Scott's children from previous marriages, subsequently filed a $100 million wrongful death suit against the county and federal government. The case lasted eight years, requiring the services of 15 attorneys and some 30 volume binders of court documents. In January 2000, attorneys for Los Angeles County and the federal government agreed to settle with Scott's heirs and estate for $5 million, even though the sheriff's department still maintained its deputies had done nothing wrong.

Michael D. Bradbury, the District Attorney of Ventura County, conducted an investigation into the raid and the aftermath, issuing a report on the events leading up to and on October 2, 1992. He concluded that asset forfeiture was a motive for the raid.

The Los Angeles County Sheriff's Department issued their own report in response, clearing everyone involved of wrongdoing, while California Attorney General Dan Lungren criticized District Attorney Bradbury. Sheriff Spencer sued D.A. Bradbury for defamation in response to the report. The court ruled in favor of Michael Bradbury and ordered Sheriff Spencer to pay $50,000 in Bradbury's legal bills.

== See also ==
- Forfeiture Endangers American Rights, a U.S. advocacy organization
- List of killings by law enforcement officers in the United States
- War on drugs
