= United States constitutional sentencing law =

U.S.A law related to criminal sentencing

The United States Constitution contains several provisions related to criminal sentencing.

The Excessive Fines Clause and the Cruel and Unusual Punishments Clause of the Eighth Amendment to the United States Constitution prohibit certain disproportionate sentences. Further, the Cruel and Unusual Punishments Clause prohibits the imposition of the death penalty for certain crimes, for certain classes of defendants, and in the absence of certain procedures. The Sixth Amendment to the United States Constitution prohibits increasing the maximum authorized sentence for an offense based on a fact not found by a jury. Mandatory minimums based on judicial fact-finding are not prohibited. The Double Jeopardy Clause of the Fifth Amendment to the United States Constitution prohibits multiple punishments for the same offense. The test of Blockburger v. United States (1932) is whether each crime contains an element that the other does not.

== Eighth Amendment ==
The Eighth Amendment to the United States Constitution provides:

[N]or [shall] excessive fines [be] imposed, nor cruel and unusual punishments inflicted.

=== Excessive fines ===
United States v. Bajakajian (1998) is the first and only case in which the Supreme Court has declared a criminal fine constitutionally excessive. There, the government sought the forfeiture of $357,144 from Hosep Krikor Bajakajian solely as a penalty for not declaring that amount to Customs when leaving the country.

The Excessive Fines Clause applies to forfeitures of property, but does not apply to punitive damages in civil suits.

=== Cruel and unusual punishments ===
==== Non-capital sentences ====
The Cruel and Unusual Punishments Clause regulates non-capital sentences far less closely than capital sentences. As a threshold inquiry, the Court will not inquire into a non-capital sentence unless the gravity of the sentence is disproportionate, even after deferring to the legislature. Next, the Court engages in a three-factor test, considering: (1) the gravity of offense, (2) an inter-jurisdictional comparison of the sentences for crime, and (3) an intra-jurisdictional comparison of the sentence given.

For example, the Eighth Amendment prohibits the imposition of the sentence of life without the possibility of parole on juvenile offenders if they did not commit homicide, or if automatically imposed by statute for homicide.

Justices Antonin Scalia and Clarence Thomas have argued that the Court should not engage in Eighth Amendment proportionality review at all.

==== Capital sentences ====
The Cruel and Unusual Punishments Clause has more to say about capital sentences. First, the Clause entirely precludes the use of capital punishment for crimes other than murder. Even with murder, the defendant must personally kill, attempt to kill, or intend to kill. Second, the Clause entirely precludes the use of capital punishment against certain classes of defendants, such as the insane, the intellectually disabled, juveniles at the time of the crime, and those who are not competent at the time of the execution.

Third, the Clause prevents the arbitrary and discriminatory use of the death penalty. Nor can the death penalty be mandatory for those convicted of a certain offense. Aggravating factors must be found by a jury. Aggravating factors cannot be vague. The sentencing decision-maker must have the authority to consider all mitigating factors.

Fourth, the Clause requires certain additional procedural rules in capital cases. For example, the jury must be permitted to consider a lesser included offense. Witherspoon v. Illinois (1968) held that jurisdictions could permit prosecutors for-cause strikes of jurors who would never impose the death penalty, but not jurors who were merely opposed to the death penalty. Such a jury is known as a death-qualified jury. Similarly, the defendant must be allowed to challenge for cause a juror who would impose the death penalty in every capital case.

== Facts not found by a jury ==
Article Three, Section Two of the United States Constitution provides:

Trial of all Crimes, except in Cases of Impeachment, shall be by Jury . . . .

The Sixth Amendment to the United States Constitution provides:

In all criminal prosecutions, the accused shall enjoy the right to a . . . trial, by an impartial jury . . . .

The Supreme Court has held that every fact that increases the maximum authorized sentence or minimum mandatory sentence must be named in the charging instrument, submitted to a jury, and proved beyond a reasonable doubt—whether or not statutory law labels that fact as an element of the offense or a sentencing factor. The only exception is the fact of prior conviction, which may be found by a judge. Because the relevant maximum is the authorized sentences that arises from the fact of conviction alone, without additional fact-finding, this principle invalidates mandatory sentencing guidelines that are the equivalent of increasing the maximum authorized sentence.

This principle does not prevent the judge from deciding whether the sentences stemming from a multi-count indictment will be concurrent or consecutive based on judicial fact-finding.

This rule was not retroactively applied in habeas cases. And, it is subject to the principles of harmless error analysis.

== Double jeopardy ==
U.S. Const. amend. V provides:

[N]or shall any person be subject for the same offense to be twice put in jeopardy of life or limb . . . .

The Double Jeopardy Clause, inter alia, prohibits multiple punishment for the same offense In Blockburger v. United States (1932), the Supreme Court announced the following test: the government may separately punish the defendant for two crimes if each crime contains an element that the other does not. Blockburger is the default rule, unless the legislatively intends to depart; for example, Continuing Criminal Enterprise (CCE) may be punished separately from its predicates, as can conspiracy.

== Due process ==
The Fifth Amendment to the United States Constitution provides:

[N]or shall any person . . . be deprived of life, liberty, or property, without due process of law . . . .

The Fourteenth Amendment to the United States Constitution provides:

[N]or shall any State deprive any person of life, liberty, or property, without due process of law . . . .

In Williams v. New York (1949), the Supreme Court held that due process does not require the use of ordinary evidentiary rules at sentencing.
