= Equitable sharing =

US police practice of sharing seized assets

Guide to Equitable Sharing (April 2009)

Equitable sharing is a United States program in which the proceeds of liquidated seized assets from asset forfeiture are shared between state and federal law enforcement authorities. The Comprehensive Crime Control Act of 1984 set up the arrangement in which state and local police can share the seizures with federal agents. The law allows state and local law enforcement to retain up to 80% of the proceeds from seizures made in collaboration with federal agencies and from seized assets turned over to the federal government that the federal government then elects to adopt.

The program was intended to improve law enforcement by financially incentivizing collaboration between federal agencies and state and local agencies. However, it has become controversial due to a perceived conflict of interest. With equitable sharing, in cases involving civil forfeiture, state police can "skirt state restrictions on the use of funds", according to New Yorker writer Sarah Stillman, meaning that local police can evade their state's rules against forfeitures or restricting use of forfeitures by bringing in federal officers. In 2010, more than $500 million was distributed through the program. More than $5 billion has been distributed since the program was born in 1984. Between 2000 and 2013, an average of $419 million was distributed each year.

The Washington Post in 2014 analyzed 400 seizures in 17 states which were examples of Equitable sharing arrangements. According to the analysis, police can stop motorists, possibly under the pretext of a minor traffic infraction, and "analyze" the intentions of motorists by assessing nervousness, and request permission to search the vehicle without a warrant, hoping to find cash or other valuables possibly involved in illegal activity. Of the 400 seizures studied by The Washington Post, police did not make any arrests, causing critics to speculate that the seizures were not related to real criminal activity but were symptomatic of corruption.

Another 2014 report by The Washington Post found that $2.5 billion had been seized through this program since 2001 without search warrants or indictments. It further found that only a sixth of these seizures were legally challenged and the federal government responded to 41% of these challenges by returning the confiscated property.

In January 2015 U.S. Attorney General Eric Holder introduced new restrictions on state and local participation in the program, limiting federal adoptions of seized assets. In December 2015 the Department of Justice suspended some more of equitable sharing program due to budget cuts. Loopholes have allowed states to continue to use federal equitable sharing. In 2016 under U.S. Attorney General Loretta Lynch the program was reinstated after earlier budgetary issues were resolved.
