= Operation Cold Front =

U.S. operation against violent crime

- Operation name: Operation Cold Front
- Type: Violent Crime Suppression

Participants
- Executed by: United States: Indiana, Kentucky, New York
- No. of countries participating: 1

Mission
- Target: Violent Criminal Suspects and Fugitives
- Objective: Execute Federal Warrants against Violent suspects and fugitives

Timeline
- Date executed: 2025-2026

Results
- Arrests: 28

Operation Cold Front is an ongoing (as of November 6, 2026) nationwide initiative led by the Federal Bureau of Investigation targeting violent crime in the United States. According to the FBI, the initiative involves coordination with federal, state, and local law enforcement agencies to execute federal warrants against violent suspects and fugitives.

== Arrests ==
- 9 Arrested in Bartholomew county Indiana
- 3 in The Northern Federal District of New York
- 12 in Jefferson County Texas

== Results ==
NOTE:These are results reported by Law enforcement at the time of seizure, and should be updated after the criminal proceedings complete for each defendant if forfeiture is completed after conviction/Civil asset forfeiture. These crimes are not proven until plea or jury, so represent the government as the sole source of information.

- Bartholomew County Indiana - Seizure of Meth, and Narotics. 2 Guilty pleas, 7 still pending trial as of 6 November 2026.
- Northern Federal District of New York - 25 lbs. Meth, 7 lbs fentanyl, 1.5 lbs cocaine, 1.5 lbs crack cocaine. 3 persons arraigned and awaiting trial as of 6 November 2026

== Participating law enforcement agencies ==
- United States
  - Federal Bureau of Investigation (FBI)
  - Drug Enforcement Administration (DEA)
