= Comprehensive Crime Control Act of 1984 =

1984 United States law reforming federal criminal statutes and procedures

- Other short titles: Acquisition of Foreign Evidence Improvements Act; Bail Reform Act of 1984; Comprehensive Forfeiture Act of 1984; Controlled Substances Penalties Amendments Act of 1984; Insanity Defense Reform Act of 1984; Livestock Fraud Protection Act; Pharmacy Protection and Violent Offender Control Act of 1984; Sentencing Reform Act of 1984
- Long title: An Act entitled the Comprehensive Crime Control Act of 1984.
- Acronyms (colloquial): CCCA
- Nicknames: Comprehensive Crime Control Act of 1983
- Enacted by: the 98th United States Congress
- Effective: October 12, 1984

Citations
- Public law: 98-473
- Statutes at Large: 98 Stat. 1837 aka 98 Stat. 1976

Codification
- Titles amended: 18 U.S.C.: Crimes and Criminal Procedure
- U.S.C. sections amended: 18 U.S.C. ch. 1 § 1 et seq.

Legislative history
- Introduced in the House as H.J.Res. 648 by Jamie L. Whitten (D-MS) on September 17, 1984; Committee consideration by House Appropriations; Passed the House on September 25, 1984 (316-91); Passed the Senate on October 4, 1984 (passed voice vote); Reported by the joint conference committee on October 10, 1984; agreed to by the House on October 10, 1984 (252-60) and by the Senate on October 11, 1984 (78-11); Signed into law by President Ronald Reagan on October 12, 1984

The Comprehensive Crime Control Act of 1984 (Pub. L. 98–473, S. 1762, 98 Stat. 1976, enacted October 12, 1984) was the first comprehensive revision of the U.S. criminal code since the early 1900s. It was sponsored by Strom Thurmond (R-SC) in the Senate and by Hamilton Fish IV (R-NY) in the House, and was eventually incorporated into an appropriations bill that passed with a vote of 78–11 in the Senate and 252–60 in the House. It was then signed into law by President Ronald Reagan.

Among its constituent parts and provisions were:

- Armed Career Criminal Act
- Sentencing Reform Act which created the United States Sentencing Commission, intended to standardize sentencing
- Extension of the Secret Service's jurisdiction over credit card fraud and computer fraud
- Increased federal penalties for cultivation, possession, or transfer of marijuana
- A new section in the criminal code for hostage taking
- Abolished parole for federal prisoners convicted after November 1, 1987
- Made several new offenses federal crimes, including arson, murder-for-hire, trademark violations, credit card fraud, and computer crime
- Stipulations about using civil forfeiture to seize assets of organized crime, establishing "equitable sharing."

== Background ==
Attempts by Congress to make changes to the U.S. Criminal Code began again in the early congressional meetings of 1971, after almost a half-century of only minor amendments and additions. A major qualm still present in the early 1970s with the U.S. Criminal Code was the issues of sentencing disparity and the parole system. In 1975, Sen. Edward Kennedy (D-MA) introduced a bill to Congress attempting to modify this existing issue in the judicial system through the creation of a sentencing committee. This resulted in backlash from experts for lacking crucial details on the issue.

In 1977, Kennedy began to gain supporters to revise the U.S. Criminal Code, gathering the support of Sen. John McClellan (D-AR) first, and in later years Sen. Strom Thurmond (R-SC) and Orrin G. Hatch (R-UT). At the beginning of 1979, Thurmond and Kennedy introduced new and revised Senate bill, in attempts to persuade the interests of the House, which had previously struck down U.S. Criminal Code revision proposals. During this time, the House had proposed Criminal Code revision legislation of its own that was met with intense criticism from interest groups, such as the American Civil Liberties Union, and justice officials.

In August of 1979, Rep. Robert Drinan (D-MA) announced to media that the House and Senate judiciary committees had agreed on the major chapters that would frame the reformation of the Criminal Code. These presented chapters would contribute to the subject layout within the final proposed legislation in 1984.

== Legislative History (1983-1984) ==
As the Judiciary Committees of the House and Senate continued their intense back-and-forth, Reagan continued to push efforts to pass a crime reform bill in his presidency. At the 1983 State of the Union address Reagan stated that crime was a top priority. Despite a crime bill being presented by Congress in 1982, it was pocket vetoed by the President on January 14th, 1983, due to the proposed bill's creation of a new powerful office for drug law enforcement.

Congress once more took on the task of creating amendments within the crime bill that would not only suit the House and the Senate, but also take into account the amendments pressed by Reagan. In his memorandum of disapproval, Reagan expressed to Congress to present a new crime bill that, unlike that which was previously presented, would focus more on the details of bail and sentencing reform in addition to creating a way to deal with foreign and domestic drug efforts without creating a new bureaucratic agency.

Finally, in September of 1984, the House Judiciary Committee member Rep. Dan Lungren (R-CA) proposed attaching House Joint Resolution 5963— a major crime bill similar to one presented in a proposed Senate crime package that had not been approved— to House Resolution 648, an appropriations resolution for the fiscal year of 1985. This proposal was approved in a bipartisan vote on October 4th by the Senate. October 10th and 11th presented agreements from the House and Senate on conference reports for HJ Res 648, thus pushing it to President Reagan's desk to be signed into law on October 12th.

== Provisions ==
=== Sentencing Reform Act of 1984 ===
The Sentencing Reform Act of 1984 was a key act passed within the Comprehensive Crime Control Act of 1984. The previous standards for sentencing were lacking in detail, causing there to be sentencing disparity between judges. The finalized Sentencing Reform Act that was produced the U.S. Sentencing Commission, made up of members chosen by the President, to create guidelines to help combat the sentencing disparity. Though this Act did not fully revoke the ability of judges to stray from standardized sentencing, judges would now have to provide a written statement providing the details of why they decided to sentence differently for a case that also fell within the areas of the new sentencing act. Within the Sentencing Reform Act came the elimination of the parole system set to go into effect in 1991.

=== Bail Reform Act of 1984 ===
The Bail Reform Act of 1984 was an act passed under the Comprehensive Crime Control Act of 1984 that created new standards in the criminal justice system for setting pre-trial release and bail to defendants. Many of the goals for the 1984 act were to revise or tie up lose ends left on bail reform from the previously enacted 1966 Bail Reform Act. The new act established in 1984, allowed judges to determine if pre-trial detention would be enacted for a defendant based on the assessment in pre-trial hearings determining whether the defendant would be a danger to the community and if there was assurance of the defendant's later appearance in court if they were released. If the defendant was denied pre-trial release, the judge was required to provide the reason for denial in writing; written conditions of release were required if the defendant was granted pre-trial release. The 1984 act included the increased fines for a defendant found to be bail jumping. Further, defendants on pre-trial or post-conviction release who committed a crime and arrested would also have their bail revoked.

=== Insanity Defense Reform Act of 1984 ===
The Insanity Defense Reform Act of 1984 created a major change in previous legislature ranging from the legal definition of insanity to the handling of an insanity defense within the courtroom. The 1984 act require proof that a defendant's "severe mental disease or defect" caused them to be unable to understand the severity of their wrongdoing rather than the previous defense of the inability to understand the criminality of the defendant's actions. Furthermore, the 1984 act shifted the burden of proof to the defendant, who must show "clear and convincing evidence" of the meeting the legal definition of insanity. Previous legislature had placed the burden of proof on the prosecutor, who was required to show beyond a reasonable doubt the defendant of the case was unable to meet the standard in which they could be considered legally insane. New legislation in the 1984 act also barred the testimony of psychiatric experts from declaring specifics of mental illness the defendant may have had at the time of the crime, suggesting the cause or defense of the committed crime.
