= Innocent owner defense =

Legal defense

An innocent owner defense is a concept in United States law providing for an affirmative defense in civil forfeiture actions that applies when a property owner claims innocence of the offense that led to the forfeiture, and so the property should not be forfeited. Innocent owner defenses exist in most state forfeiture laws, as well as in federal law. The innocent owner defense in federal forfeiture law is defined in section 983(d) of title 18 of the United States Code (18 U.S.C. § 983(d)). It is part of the Code that defines forfeiture laws and more specifically the general rules for civil forfeiture proceedings. It states that the "claimant shall have the burden of proving that the claimant is an innocent owner by a preponderance of the evidence.

That question was addressed by the Eastern District of New York in United States v. Liberty Avenue. The question in that case was whether a property owner can assert the innocent owner defense on the basis of lack of consent even if he admits to having knowledge of the drug-related use of his property.

The government argued that to assert the innocent owner defense successfully, the claimant must show both lack of knowledge and lack of consent. The claimant, on the other hand, asserted that lack of consent is an independent way of satisfying the requirements of the innocent owner defense and so he could thus prevail by showing that he did not consent to the criminal use of his property. The court adopted this position, ruling that the claimant should have an opportunity to prove lack of consent, which would entitle him to the protection of the innocent owner defense.

In addition to inconsistency in the lower about whether that phrase should be interpreted conjunctively or disjunctively, courts have also inconsistently defined the statutory terms "knowledge" and "consent." This inconsistent judicial interpretation renders the standard for "innocence" under the innocent owner defense unclear.

In Bennis v. Michigan, the U.S. Supreme Court considered whether an innocent owner defense was required by the Due Process Clause of the United States Constitution. There, a wife claimed that forfeiture of a vehicle she co-owned with her husband for her husband's solicitation offense (committed without her knowledge or consent) was unconstitutional. The U.S. Supreme Court held that the forfeiture was not unconstitutional under the Fourteenth Amendment. There remain, however, open constitutional questions regarding innocent owners and civil forfeiture.
