= Forfeiture Endangers American Rights =

American non-profit organization

Forfeiture Endangers American Rights (F.E.A.R.) is an organization in the United States dedicated to stopping abuse of asset forfeiture, the practice whereby governments seize tangible and financial assets alleged to have been used in the commission of certain crimes. It is a 501(c)(3) charitable organization located in Mill Valley, California. Its president is Brenda Grantland since 1998.

== See also ==
- Civil forfeiture in the United States
