= United States v. Bajakajian =

- Supreme Court of the United States

Argued November 4, 1997 Decided June 22, 1998
- Full case name: United States v. Hosep Krikor Bajakajian
- Citations: 524 U.S. 321 (more) 118 S. Ct. 2028; 141 L. Ed. 2d 314; 1998 U.S. LEXIS 4172; 66 U.S.L.W. 4514; 98 Cal. Daily Op. Service 4757; 98 Daily Journal DAR 6736; 1998 Colo. J. C.A.R. 3239; 11 Fla. L. Weekly Fed. S 662
- Argument: Oral argument

Case history
- Prior: Forfeiture order affirmed, 84 F.3d 334 (9th Cir. 1996); cert. granted, 520 U.S. 1239 (1997).

Holding
- Forfeiture of $357,144 for violation of 31 U.S.C. § 5316, requiring reporting of all international movements of currency with value over $10,000, violates the Eighth Amendment's Excessive Fines clause.

Court membership
- Chief Justice William Rehnquist Associate Justices John P. Stevens · Sandra Day O'Connor; Antonin Scalia · Anthony Kennedy; David Souter · Clarence Thomas; Ruth Bader Ginsburg · Stephen Breyer

Case opinions
- Majority: Thomas, joined by Stevens, Souter, Ginsburg, Breyer
- Dissent: Kennedy, joined by Rehnquist, O'Connor, Scalia

Laws applied
- U.S. Const. Amend. VIII; 18 U.S.C. § 982(a); 31 U.S.C. §§ 5316(a)(1)(A), 5322(a)

United States v. Bajakajian, 524 U.S. 321 (1998), is a U.S. Supreme Court case holding that asset forfeiture is unconstitutional when it is "grossly disproportional to the gravity of the defendant’s offense", citing the Excessive Fines clause of the Eighth Amendment. It was the first time the Court struck down the federal government's "aggressive use of forfeiture" and the only time it has held that an imposed fine was unconstitutional under the Eighth Amendment.

== Background ==
In 1994, Syrian immigrant Hosep Bajakajian and his family tried to fly from Los Angeles to Cyprus via Italy with $357,144 in their luggage in order to pay a debt. The federal government sought forfeiture of the entire sum under the Bank Secrecy Act (BSA), which requires all international currency transfers exceeding $10,000 in value to be reported on a Currency and Other Monetary Instruments Report (CMIR); the BSA also allows forfeiture of "any property, real or personal" in cases of violations. None of the money was found to have been connected with any other criminal action whatsoever. He was also initially charged with lying to customs, which was later dropped.

Bajakajian pleaded guilty to failure to report and opted for a bench trial on the forfeiture of the $357,144. A United States district court judge found the forfeiture of the whole $357,144 to be grossly disproportionate and in violation of the Eighth Amendment. He ordered forfeiture of $15,000 in addition to the maximum fine of $5,000 and three years probation for failure to report. Bajakajian had been eligible for six months in prison, but the judge did not impose this sentence.

In 1996, the U.S. Court of Appeals for the Ninth Circuit affirmed the district court's decision and stated its willingness to go further by ruling that the forfeiture of any of the currency was unconstitutional. Unfortunately for Bajakajian, he had not appealed the forfeiture to the Ninth Circuit and they were thus unable to set it aside.

== Opinion of the Court ==
The case was argued before the Supreme Court on November 4, 1997, and decided on June 22, 1998. The Opinion of the Court was delivered by Justice Clarence Thomas, who was joined by Justices Stevens, Souter, Ginsburg, and Breyer. Justice Anthony Kennedy dissented, joined by Chief Justice Rehnquist, Justice O'Connor and Justice Scalia.

At issue was the Bank Secrecy Act, which provided that violators face forfeiture of "any property, real or personal". As understood by U.S. Customs and Border Protection, this law allowed the forfeiture of all of the money that the respondent had tried to take out of the country. The question was whether this conflicted with the Eighth Amendment's provision that "excessive fines [not be] imposed".

Justice Thomas concluded:

Comparing the gravity of respondent's crime with the $357,144 forfeiture the Government seeks, we conclude that such a forfeiture would be grossly disproportional to the gravity of his offense. It is larger than the $5,000 fine imposed by the District Court by many orders of magnitude, and it bears no articulable correlation to any injury suffered by the Government.

Although Thomas noted that the case was complicated by the fact that both federal law and the government's case in Bajakajian somewhat blurred the distinction between civil forfeiture and a fine intended to punish, it was clear in this case that punishment was at least part of the government's intent. Clarifying whether seizures of property are considered fines or punishments, he decreed that a criminal forfeiture could be considered as both a type of fine and a punishment, while a civil forfeiture was not intended as a punishment of a person but rather a "legal fiction of punishing the property", concluding that civil forfeitures were not a type of fine. However, the case allowed the Court to look at the issue of excessive fines apart from other criminal issues because there were no charges against the respondent other than failing to report the cash transfer; a separate charge of lying to customs officials had been dropped.

== Impact ==
Bajakajian was the first time the Supreme Court had ever invalidated a criminal fine as excessive under the Eighth Amendment.

As of 2015, there have been 150 federal circuit court decisions that relied on Bajakajian to conduct an excessiveness test, but only 4 of them have found excessive forfeiture. One commentator argues that this is due to lower courts applying the Bajakajian framework too rigidly.

Bajakajian's application is being extended beyond forfeiture. In Duckworth v. United States (2011), the D.C. Circuit applied Bajakajian to the Magnuson–Stevens Fishery Conservation and Management Act, upholding fines imposed by NOAA. In United States v. Lessner (2007), the Third Circuit applied it to the Mandatory Victims Restitution Act, which established procedures to determine restitution for victims, and upheld a $938,965.59 restitution order. In United States v. Stebbins (2005), the Court of Appeals for the Armed Forces upheld a $75,000 fine to punish a soldier found guilty of raping a minor.

== See also ==
- Bank Secrecy Act
- Civil forfeiture in the United States
- Eighth Amendment to the United States Constitution
