= Sarah Stillman =

American journalist

- Born: February 19, 1984 (age 42)
- Education: Yale University (BA, MA); University of Oxford (DPhil)
- Occupation: Writer
- Writing career
- Language: English
- Notable awards: George Polk Award (2012, 2021); Hillman Prize (2012); MacArthur Fellow (2016); Pulitzer Prize for Explanatory Reporting (2024)

Sarah Stillman (born February 19, 1984), is an American professor, staff writer at The New Yorker magazine, and Pulitzer Prize-winning journalist focusing on immigration policy, the criminal justice system, and the impacts of climate change on workers.

== Education ==
Stillman was raised in Washington, D.C. and graduated from Georgetown Day School, before attending Yale University. While in college, she founded and edited an interdisciplinary feminist journal, Manifesta, and co-directed the Student Legal Action Movement, a group devoted to reforming the American prison system. At Yale, Stillman taught poetry and writing to inmates at the men's maximum-security prison in Cheshire, CT. As a senior, she won the Elie Wiesel Prize in Ethics. She graduated from Yale summa cum laude in 2006 with bachelor's and master's degrees in anthropology.

After graduating from Yale, Stillman attended Oxford University on a Marshall Scholarship, where she received her DPhil in anthropology.

She was a visiting scholar at New York University and has taught at Columbia University and at Yale University. She is also a staff writer for The New Yorker.

== Career ==
In 2008, Stillman traveled to Iraq as a journalist where she was embedded with the 116th Military Police Company. She joined The New Yorker in 2012. That same year, she won a National Magazine Award in 2012 for her reporting from Iraq and Afghanistan on labor abuses and human trafficking on United States military bases and a 2012 George Polk Award for her reporting on the high-risk use of young people as confidential informants in the war on drugs. Since joining The New Yorker, her investigative reporting has shed light on profiteering in key areas of U.S. life, particularly prisons and jails; immigration detention facilities; disaster recovery programs; and U.S. war zone contracting. She has written in-depth stories on the return of debtors’ prisons, the police use and abuse of civil asset forfeiture, family separations at the U.S.-Mexico border, and more.

In 2016, while still at The New Yorker, Stillman became founding director of the Global Migration Project at Columbia University Graduate School of Journalism, where she taught a course on “Gender and Migration” and mentored post-graduate fellows on a range of refugee-related reporting projects. She eventually left the project in 2020.

In 2019, Stillman won another National Magazine Award for her article in The New Yorker on deportation as a death sentence. She won a second Polk Award in 2021 for coverage of migrant workers and climate change. The following year, she reported and voiced “The Essential Workers of the Climate Crisis” for WNYC Studios, which won the national Edward R. Murrow Award for best radio news documentary. In 2024, Stillman won a Pulitzer Prize for Explanatory Reporting for her coverage in The New Yorker about troubling injustices in felony murder prosecutions in the U.S.

She runs the Yale Investigative Reporting Lab, a collaborative public-interest journalism project that seeks to deepen coverage of criminal justice, climate change, migration, and mental health. Stillman also teaches narrative non-fiction at Yale University's English Department.

== Awards ==
Along with two George Polk Awards, two National Magazine Awards, and a Pulitzer Prize, Stillman has received a series of accolades for her work. In 2012, she received the Hillman Prize. She received a MacArthur fellowship in 2016 and was elected to the American Academy of Arts and Sciences in 2020.

She is also the recipient of the Overseas Press Club's Joe and Laurie Dine Award for international human-rights reporting and the Michael Kelly Award.

== Bibliography ==
=== Books ===
- Stillman, Sarah (2000). Soul searching : a girl's guide to finding herself. Illustrated by Susan Gross. Hillsboro, Oregon: Beyond Words.
- — (2001). Soul searching journal : a girl's guide to finding herself. New York: Simon Pulse/Beyond Words.
- — (2012). Soul searching : a girl's guide to finding herself. Illustrated by Susan Gross (Updated ed.). New York: Simon Pulse.

=== Essays and reporting ===
- Stillman, Sarah (April 8, 2013). "Up in the air". Goings on About Town. Dept. of Hobbyists. The New Yorker. 89 (8): 24, 26.
- — (May 20, 2024). "The right to hug : children are fighting to visit their parents in county jails". American Chronicles. The New Yorker. 100 (13): 22–26. (Note: Online version is titled "Do children have a 'right to hug' their parents?".)

———————

Bibliography notes
