= Austin v. United States =

- Supreme Court of the United States

Argued April 20, 1993 Decided June 28, 1993
- Full case name: Austin v. United States
- Docket no.: 92-6073
- Citations: 509 U.S. 602 (more) 113 S. Ct. 2801; 125 L. Ed. 2d 488

Case history
- Prior: United States v. One Parcel of Prop. Located at 508 Depot St., 964 F.2d 814 (8th Cir. 1992); cert. granted, 506 U.S. 1074 (1993).

Holding
- Forfeiture under §§881(a)(4) and (a)(7) is a monetary punishment and, as such, is subject to the limitations of the Excessive Fines Clause.

Court membership
- Chief Justice William Rehnquist Associate Justices Byron White · Harry Blackmun; John P. Stevens · Sandra Day O'Connor; Antonin Scalia · Anthony Kennedy; David Souter · Clarence Thomas

Case opinions
- Majority: Blackmun, joined by White, Stevens, O'Connor, Souter
- Concurrence: Scalia (in part and in judgment)
- Concurrence: Kennedy (in part and in judgment), joined by Rehnquist, Thomas

Austin v. United States, 509 U.S. 602 (1993), was a case in which the Supreme Court of the United States held that the Eighth Amendment to the United States Constitution applies to civil forfeiture cases.

== Background ==
Richard Lyle Austin was indicted for violating South Dakota's drug laws. He pleaded guilty to one count of possession cocaine with intent to distribute and was sentenced to seven years in jail. The United States then filed an in rem action, seeking forfeiture of Austin's mobile home and auto body shop under federal statutes that provide for forfeiture of property that is used or intended for use to facilitate the transportation of controlled substances, or related materials. Austin argued that forfeiture of his property would violate the Eighth Amendment's Excessive Fines Clause.

== Opinion of the Court ==
In an opinion written by Justice Harry Blackmun, the Court held that civil forfeiture proceedings are "subject to the limitations of the Eight Amendment's Excessive Fines Clause." Justice Antonin Scalia filed an opinion concurring in part and concurring in the judgment, writing that the majority should not have decided whether in rem forfeitures always amount to a punishment of the owner. Justice Anthony Kennedy also filed an opinion concurring in part and concurring in the judgment which was joined by Chief Justice William Rehnquist and Justice Clarence Thomas.
