= 2000 in music =

This is a list of notable events in music that took place in the year 2000. This year was the peak of CD sales in the United States, with sales declining year on year since then.

== Specific locations ==
- 2000 in British music
- 2000 in Norwegian music
- 2000 in Scandinavian music
- 2000 in South Korean music

== Specific genres ==
- 2000 in classical music
- 2000 in country music
- 2000 in heavy metal music
- 2000 in hip-hop
- 2000 in jazz
- 2000 in Latin music
- 2000 in progressive rock

== Events ==
=== January ===
- January 1
  - In New York City, United States, at precisely midnight, Prince celebrates the start of the final year before the new millennium by playing his anthemic "1999", in what he vows is the song's finale.
  - British composer John Tavener is knighted in the New Year's Honours List.
- January 11
  - Gary Glitter is released after serving just two months of his four-month sentence for downloading 4,000 child pornography images.
  - Sharon Osbourne quits as manager of Smashing Pumpkins after only three months. In a brash press release she announces she had to resign "for medical reasons: Billy Corgan was making me sick."
  - Singer Whitney Houston is caught with 15.2 grams of marijuana in her bag at a Hawaii airport. She boards her flight to San Francisco before police can arrive to arrest her.
- January 13 – Mexican singer Gloria Trevi is arrested in Rio de Janeiro.
- January 14 – Rolling Stone reveals that the two children of Melissa Etheridge and her partner, Julie Cypher, were fathered by David Crosby.
- January 18 – Spencer Goodman is executed by lethal injection in Huntsville, Texas, for the 1991 kidnap and murder of the wife of ZZ Top manager Bill Ham. Ham is present at the execution.
- January 21–February 6 – The Big Day Out festival takes place in Australia and New Zealand, headlined by Red Hot Chili Peppers and Nine Inch Nails. Mr. Bungle are originally named in the lineup, but are "kicked off" due to an ongoing dispute with the Red Hot Chili Peppers.

=== February ===
- February 9 – The Million Dollar Hotel, a film co-written by U2 lead singer Bono, premieres at the 50th Berlinale (Berlin International Film Festival).
- February 11 – Diana Ross divorces Arne Næss Jr., her husband of 14 years.
- February 16 – The Silver Tassie, an opera by Mark-Anthony Turnage, receives its première at the London Coliseum, performed by the English National Opera.
- February 23 – At the 42nd Annual Grammy Awards, Santana win a record 8 Grammys in one night, tying Michael Jackson who won 8 in 1984. Among the awards won are Album of the Year for Supernatural and Record of the Year and Song of the Year, both for "Smooth" featuring Matchbox Twenty frontman Rob Thomas. Christina Aguilera won Best New Artist.
- February 24 – Italian motorcycle manufacturing company Aprilia wins a lawsuit filed against the Spice Girls over a sponsorship deal that fell apart when Geri Halliwell left the group.

=== March ===
- March 6 – Foxy Brown is injured in a car accident in Brooklyn, New York, in which her car hit a fence. Police discover that Brown was driving with a suspended driver license and order her to appear in court in April. Brown's license was suspended for failing to appear in court for a parking violation.
- March 7 – Heavy metal band Disturbed release their debut studio album The Sickness.
- March 11 – 311 holds their first 3–11 Day concert at Tower Records in the French Quarter of New Orleans.
- March 13 – Blink-182 end their European tour early after guitarist/vocalist Tom DeLonge and drummer Travis Barker succumb to strep throat.
- March 21 – NSYNC rises to superstardom after the fast-paced sales of their third studio album No Strings Attached.
- March 24 – After violating a prior probation agreement by getting drunk, Ol' Dirty Bastard is ordered to undergo a 90-day diagnostic evaluation at the California Institute For Men in Chino, California.

=== April ===
- April 1 – Ted Nugent angers Hispanic groups in Texas after onstage remarks he makes during a concert at the Cynthia Woods Mitchell Pavilion, in which he says that those who did not speak English should get out of America. He is banned from the venue as a result.
- April 4 – Mick Jagger attends the opening of an arts center named after him at Dartford Grammar School in southeast England.
- April 6 – Shawn Colvin, James Taylor, Cyndi Lauper, Richard Thompson, Sweet Honey in the Rock, Elton John, Cassandra Wilson, Wynonna Judd, k.d. lang, Bryan Adams, and Mary Chapin Carpenter perform in New York as part of a tribute to Joni Mitchell.
- April 12 – Metallica files a lawsuit against the peer-to-peer service Napster, as well as Yale University, University of Southern California and Indiana University for copyright infringement. Yale and Indiana are later dropped from the suit when they block access to Napster on campus computers.
- April 25 – Nu metal band Papa Roach releases their second studio album, Infest.

=== May ===
- May 1 – A $1.8 million civil fraud lawsuit is filed against Neil Young in Los Angeles Superior Court by a former Village Voice writer. The lawsuit charges that Young broke an agreement to have a biography written about him when he blocked the book's publication.
- May 3 – 75-year-old tenor Carlo Bergonzi makes his final professional appearance at Carnegie Hall, in a concert performance of Otello. After two acts, he is replaced by an understudy.
- May 5 – Rod Stewart undergoes an hour-long throat operation at Cedars-Sinai Medical Center in Los Angeles to remove a growth on his thyroid, which turns out to be benign.
- May 6 – John Mellencamp receives an honorary Doctor of Music degree as the commencement speaker for Indiana University's Class of 2000.
- May 7 – Westlife releases their 2000 debut album with the release of their Billboard #1 hit single "Swear It Again", as the group's first and only single to have charted in the US.
- May 13 – The 45th Eurovision Song Contest final, held in Stockholm's Globe Arena, is won by Denmark's Olsen Brothers and the song "Fly on the Wings of Love".
- May 16 – Prince announces that he has changed his name back to Prince now that his publishing contract with Warner/Chappell has expired. He had been known as an unpronounceable symbol since 1993.
- May 20 – The 28th OTI Festival, held at the Centro de Convenciones in Acapulco, Mexico, is won by the song "Hierba mala", written by Angie Chirio, Olga María Chirino, and Emilio Estefan, and performed by Hermanas Chirino representing the United States.
- May 23 – Eminem releases his third studio album The Marshall Mathers LP selling over 1.76 million copies in its first week, and becomes the fastest selling hip-hop album ever in first week sales.
- May 24 – 50 Cent is shot nine times in Queens. After spending time in hospital he returns to recording and performing.
- May 25 – Eddie Van Halen begins treatment for prevention of tongue cancer at the University of Texas MD Anderson Cancer Center in Houston, Texas.
- May 29 – Michael Jackson and Mariah Carey are named the Best Selling Male and Female artist of the millennium at the World Music Awards in Monaco.

=== June ===
- June 8 – Sinéad O'Connor comes out as a lesbian in an interview with Curve magazine.
- June 17 – Aaliyah's "Try Again" reaches number one on the Billboard Hot 100. It becomes the first airplay song in history to reach number one following new chart rules placed in 1998 that allowed airplay singles to chart for the first time.
- June 20 – Britney Spears begins her Oops!... I Did It Again World Tour, her first world tour, visiting North America, Europe and Brazil in support her sophomore album, Oops!... I Did It Again. The tour was a commercial success and became the second highest-grossing tour by a solo artist in 2000, only behind Tina Turner's Twenty Four Seven retirement tour.
- June 23–25 – The Experience Music Project, now the Museum of Pop Culture, opens in Seattle.
- June 30 – Nine people are crushed to death during Pearl Jam's set at the Roskilde Festival, in Roskilde, Denmark.

=== July–August ===
- July 21–22 – Oasis plays at Wembley Stadium. The first of this night is featured on the double CD and the DVD Familiar to Millions.
- July 26 – A U.S. district judge orders the Napster to halt the trading of copyrighted music among its users, essentially ordering it shut down. A stay on the injunction is granted two days later, allowing the site to continue operating for the time being.
- August 1 – Experimental pop band Animal Collective release their debut album Spirit They're Gone, Spirit They've Vanished under the name Avey Tare & Panda Bear.
- August 8 – A coalition of 28 U.S. states file a lawsuit against the major record labels, accusing them of keeping the prices of CDs fixed at artificially high prices since 1995.
- August 11 – Madonna gives birth to her second child, son Rocco. Film director Guy Ritchie is the father.
- August 14 – Outside the Democratic National Convention in Los Angeles, Rage Against the Machine performs a free concert protesting the two-party system. In a chaotic scene after the performance, police forcibly disperse the crowd and several arrests are made.
- August 16 – Rapper Eminem files for divorce from wife Kim Mathers.
- August 20 – Skinny Puppy reunite for a concert at the Doomsday Festival in Dresden, Germany.
- August 22 – Nu Metal band Mudvayne Released their debut studio album L.D. 50.

=== September ===
- September 7 – Rage Against the Machine's Tim Commerford is arrested for climbing on the set at MTV's Video Music Awards after his band lost the award for "Best Rock Video" to Limp Bizkit. The director of Rage's "Sleep Now in the Fire" video, Michael Moore, suggests Commerford was probably "just bored" by the show. NSYNC performed their hit single "Bye Bye Bye".
- September 11- Successful British girl group Sugababes release their debut single 'Overload'.
- September 13 – The first Latin Grammy Awards are held.
- September 23 – Isaac Stern celebrates his 80th birthday together with his 40th anniversary as President of Carnegie Hall.
- September 26 – Pearl Jam releases twenty-five live albums, each taken from a different show on their European tour, as the initial part of the Pearl Jam Official Bootlegs series.

=== October ===
- October 1 – Midnight Oil perform their single "Beds are Burning" at the closing of the 2000 Summer Olympics dressed in outfits clearly displaying the word "Sorry" in reference to Australian Prime Minister John Howard's refusal to apologise to the Stolen Generation.
- October 2 – Radiohead release their fourth studio album, Kid A. While highly anticipated in the leadup to its release, the album is met with polarized responses from fans and critics as a result of its shift from the densely-layered alternative rock of its 1997 predecessor in favor of electronica-tinged post-rock. However, its reputation would grow more unanimously positive over the years, eventually being regarded by music analysts as one of the greatest albums of all time.
- October 3 – Green Day release their sixth album Warning. Despite positive reviews from critics, it would end up a commercial disappointment compared to their previous efforts.
- October 5
  - The Beatles release a hardcover book version of The Beatles Anthology, containing newly published photos and interviews with band members. The book went straight to the top of the New York Times Bestseller List.
  - EMI and Warner Music Group withdraw their application to the European Commission for a proposed $20 billion merger due to regulators' concerns. The merger would have concentrated 80% of the European music business into the hands of just four major labels.
- October 18 – Zack de la Rocha leaves Rage Against the Machine saying that the band's decision-making process has completely failed.
- October 24 – Linkin Park release their debut album Hybrid Theory. It has reached diamond certification by the RIAA, with 11 million units as of 2017, making it the best-selling rock album of the 21st century.
- October 31 – Napster and BMG Music announce a partnership that would change the website into a subscription-based service offering legal downloads.

=== November–December ===
- November 5 – The fourth Terrastock festival is held in Seattle.
- November 18 – A new musical adaptation of Georg Büchner's Woyzeck by Robert Wilson and Tom Waits opens in Copenhagen.
- November 21 - The Backstreet Boys experience back-to-back sales after the release of their 4th/3rd album Black & Blue.
- December 2
  - Tripp Eisen formerly of Dope replaces Koichi Fukuda in Static-X.
  - The Smashing Pumpkins played what was to be their final concert at the Metro Club in Chicago. The band would reunite in 2005.
- December 22
  - Madonna marries film director Guy Ritchie, at Skibo Castle in Dornoch, Sutherland, Scotland with Gwyneth Paltrow, Stella McCartney, Sting, George Clooney, Jon Bon Jovi, Celine Dion, Bryan Adams, Rupert Everett and others in attendance.
  - The Coen brothers film, O Brother, Where Art Thou? is released, scored by a T-Bone Burnett-produced soundtrack that revives the popularity of traditional American folk music and bluegrass.
- December 31 – Chris Robinson of The Black Crowes marries actress Kate Hudson.

== Bands formed ==
- See Musical groups established in 2000

== Bands disbanded ==
- All Saints (reformed in 2006)
- Art of Noise
- Atari Teenage Riot (reformed in 2010)
- B*Witched (reformed 2012)
- Ben Folds Five (reformed in 2011)
- Color Me Badd
- Pezz (legal issue with band name, changed name to Billy Talent)
- Candlebox (reformed in 2006)
- Demonoid
- Drain STH
- Electric Light Orchestra (with new members except for original members, Jeff Lynne and Richard Tandy)
- Genesis (would sporadically reunite for reunion tours in 2006 and 2020)
- The Golden Palominos
- Hi-Standard
- Hum
- Jack Off Jill
- June of 44
- Kid Dynamite
- Knapsack
- Lifter Puller
- Luna Sea
- Luscious Jackson
- Make-Up
- The Paradise Motel (reform in 2007)
- Phish (hiatus until 2002, disband in 2004)
- The Posies (reformed in 2004)
- Primus (hiatus until 2004)
- Pure
- Rage Against the Machine (reformed in 2007)
- Sacred Reich (reformed in 2006)
- Screaming Trees
- Seaweed (reformed in 2007)
- Skunk Anansie (reformed 2009)
- The Smashing Pumpkins (reformed in 2006)
- Soul Coughing
- Spice Girls
- Symposium
- Urban Dance Squad

== Bands reformed ==
- The Presidents of the United States of America (after 1998 break)

== Albums released ==
=== January–March ===
Date		Album	Artist	Notes
J A N U A R Y	4	Amanda Stott	Amanda Stott	Debut
J A N U A R Y	4	Any Given Sunday	Various Artists	Soundtrack
J A N U A R Y	4	These Words	Angela Aki	Debut
J A N U A R Y	11	The Days In Between	Blue Rodeo	-
J A N U A R Y	11	Live!	Chuck Berry	Live
J A N U A R Y	11	Permanently	Mark Wills	-
J A N U A R Y	11	Spit	Kittie	Debut
J A N U A R Y	11	This Present Darkness	Chimaira	EP
J A N U A R Y	14	The Screen Behind the Mirror	Enigma	-
J A N U A R Y	17	How Strange, Innocence	Explosions in the Sky	-
J A N U A R Y	17	The Lioness	Songs: Ohia	-
J A N U A R Y	17	Mirror	Flying Saucer Attack	-
J A N U A R Y	17	Radio Video	Royal Trux	-
J A N U A R Y	18	Building Nothing Out of Something	Modest Mouse	Compilation
J A N U A R Y	18	J.E. Heartbreak	Jagged Edge	-
J A N U A R Y	18	Night Life	Outsidaz	Debut
J A N U A R Y	18	The Skiffle Sessions – Live in Belfast 1998	Van Morrison with Lonnie Donegan and Chris Barber	Live
J A N U A R Y	20	Genius 2000	Namie Amuro	-
J A N U A R Y	24	Razorblade Romance	HIM	-
J A N U A R Y	25	Designs for Automotion	Snapcase	-
J A N U A R Y	25	Free Signal	Beanbag	-
J A N U A R Y	25	Guy III	Guy	-
J A N U A R Y	25	Introduction to Mayhem	Primer 55	-
J A N U A R Y	25	Life'll Kill Ya	Warren Zevon	-
J A N U A R Y	25	Masters Of The 1 & 2 – History's Greatest DJ's	Various Artists	-
J A N U A R Y	25	Southern Discomfort	Eyehategod	-
J A N U A R Y	25	A Thought Crushed My Mind	Blindside	-
J A N U A R Y	25	Voodoo	D'Angelo	-
J A N U A R Y	25	We Are the Streets	The Lox	-
J A N U A R Y	31	Deggial	Therion	-
J A N U A R Y	31	XTRMNTR	Primal Scream	-
J A N U A R Y	?	Lump	The Presidents of the United States of America	Compilation
F E B R U A R Y	1	Tha Eastsidaz	Tha Eastsidaz	-
F E B R U A R Y	1	Greatest Hits Volume Three: Best of the Brother Years 1970–1986	The Beach Boys	Compilation
F E B R U A R Y	1	MP4: Days Since a Lost Time Accident	Michael Penn	-
F E B R U A R Y	1	New Day Dawning	Wynonna Judd	-
F E B R U A R Y	1	The Night	Morphine	-
F E B R U A R Y	2	Sonic Dynamite	Pink Cream 69	-
F E B R U A R Y	4	Do Robots Dream of Electric Sheep?	Blackmail	Compilation
F E B R U A R Y	7	The Art of Self Defense	High on Fire	-
F E B R U A R Y	7	The Crybaby	Melvins	-
F E B R U A R Y	7	Incipit Satan	Gorgoroth	-
F E B R U A R Y	7	Nixon	Lambchop	-
F E B R U A R Y	7	What A Beautiful Waste	Socialburn	Debut
F E B R U A R Y	8	The Better Life	3 Doors Down	Debut
F E B R U A R Y	8	Both Sides Now	Joni Mitchell	-
F E B R U A R Y	8	The Chainheart Machine	Soilwork	-
F E B R U A R Y	8	Demons & Wizards	Demons & Wizards	US
F E B R U A R Y	8	Let's Get Free	Dead Prez	-
F E B R U A R Y	8	Let's Talk about Leftovers	Lagwagon	-
F E B R U A R Y	8	Live: A Night on the Strip	L.A. Guns	Live
F E B R U A R Y	8	Nia	Blackalicious	-
F E B R U A R Y	8	S.I.O.S.O.S. Volume One	Spooks	Debut
F E B R U A R Y	8	Suicide Pact – You First	Therapy?	US
F E B R U A R Y	8	Supreme Clientele	Ghostface Killah	-
F E B R U A R Y	8	Y2K: The Album	Screwball	-
F E B R U A R Y	15	2gether	2gether	-
F E B R U A R Y	15	Automatic Midnight	Hot Snakes	Debut
F E B R U A R Y	15	The Big Bang!: Best of the MC5	MC5	Compilation
F E B R U A R Y	15	Bloodflowers	The Cure	-
F E B R U A R Y	15	Book of Thugs	Trick Daddy	-
F E B R U A R Y	15	Hear My Cry	Sonique	-
F E B R U A R Y	15	Infinite Possibilities	Amel Larrieux	Debut
F E B R U A R Y	15	Lonesomeville	Chris Cummings	-
F E B R U A R Y	15	The Suicide Machines	The Suicide Machines	-
F E B R U A R Y	15	Telling Stories	Tracy Chapman	-
F E B R U A R Y	15	Wonder Boys: Music from the Motion Picture	Various Artists	Soundtrack
F E B R U A R Y	21	The Next Best Thing	Madonna	Soundtrack
F E B R U A R Y	22	And Then Nothing Turned Itself Inside-Out	Yo La Tengo	-
F E B R U A R Y	22	The Blue Room	Union	-
F E B R U A R Y	22	Carpal Tunnel Syndrome	Kid Koala	-
F E B R U A R Y	22	The Dead Shall Dead Remain	Impaled	-
F E B R U A R Y	22	D.I.T.C.	Diggin' in the Crates Crew	Debut
F E B R U A R Y	22	The Fourth Legacy	Kamelot	-
F E B R U A R Y	22	Frankenstein Girls Will Seem Strangely Sexy	Mindless Self Indulgence	-
F E B R U A R Y	22	Freak Magnet	Violent Femmes	-
F E B R U A R Y	22	Furnace Room Lullaby	Neko Case and Her Boyfriends	-
F E B R U A R Y	22	Live at the Fillmore – February 1969	The Byrds	Live
F E B R U A R Y	22	Look Away + 4	The Apples in Stereo	EP
F E B R U A R Y	22	No One Does It Better	SoulDecision	Canada
F E B R U A R Y	22	Pennybridge Pioneers	Millencolin	-
F E B R U A R Y	22	Tragic Epilogue	Antipop Consortium	Debut
F E B R U A R Y	22	Welcome to Earth	Apoptygma Berzerk	-
F E B R U A R Y	23	B'z The "Mixture"	B'z	Remix/compilation
F E B R U A R Y	23	The Return of the Great Gildersleeves	Danger Danger	Japanese release date
F E B R U A R Y	23	The Virgin Suicides	Air	Soundtrack
F E B R U A R Y	28	Standing on the Shoulder of Giants	Oasis	-
F E B R U A R Y	28	Stiff Upper Lip	AC/DC	UK
F E B R U A R Y	28	Daisies of the Galaxy	Eels	UK
F E B R U A R Y	28	Aquarius	Aqua	-
F E B R U A R Y	29	BTNHResurrection	Bone Thugs-n-Harmony	-
F E B R U A R Y	29	Double Take	Petra	-
F E B R U A R Y	29	Get Some Go Again	Rollins Band	-
F E B R U A R Y	29	Hooray for Boobies	Bloodhound Gang	US delayed release
F E B R U A R Y	29	Live at the Greek	Jimmy Page and The Black Crowes	Live
F E B R U A R Y	29	Machina/The Machines of God	The Smashing Pumpkins	-
F E B R U A R Y	29	MTV Unplugged	Shakira	Live
F E B R U A R Y	29	NakedSelf	The The	-
F E B R U A R Y	29	One Endless Night	Jimmie Dale Gilmore	-
F E B R U A R Y	29	Passenger	Tara MacLean	-
F E B R U A R Y	29	The Truth	Beanie Sigel	Debut
F E B R U A R Y	29	Two Against Nature	Steely Dan	-
M A R C H	1	The Swiss Army Romance	Dashboard Confessional	Debut
M A R C H	3	Blackout Analysis	Vendetta Red	Debut
M A R C H	6	The Secret Language of Birds	Ian Anderson	-
M A R C H	7	Adventures of the Imagination	Michael Schenker	-
M A R C H	7	The Art of Self Defense	High on Fire	-
M A R C H	7	Back in Your Life	Julian Austin	-
M A R C H	7	Chore of Enchantment	Giant Sand	-
M A R C H	7	The Dwarves Come Clean	Dwarves	-
M A R C H	7	How to Meet Girls	Nerf Herder	-
M A R C H	7	Journey to the End of the Night	The Mekons	-
M A R C H	7	Launched	Beatsteaks	-
M A R C H	7	Project M-13	Milk Cult	-
M A R C H	7	Revelation	Armored Saint	-
M A R C H	7	Shades of Purple	M2M	Debut
M A R C H	7	The Sickness	Disturbed	-
M A R C H	7	Snowfall	Yanni	Compilation
M A R C H	7	The State	Nickelback	-
M A R C H	7	Swagger	Flogging Molly	Debut
M A R C H	7	Turn	Great Big Sea	US
M A R C H	7	Welcome to the Afterfuture	Mike Ladd	-
M A R C H	10	Reflector	Killing Heidi	-
M A R C H	13	He Has Left Us Alone but Shafts of Light Sometimes Grace the Corner of Our Rooms...	A Silver Mt. Zion	Debut
M A R C H	13	The Platinum Album	Vengaboys	-
M A R C H	13	Revelation 666 – The Curse of Damnation	Old Man's Child	-
M A R C H	14	Additional Creations	Joe Satriani	-
M A R C H	14	Comatised	Leona Naess	Debut
M A R C H	14	Crack a Smile...and More!	Poison	-
M A R C H	14	Engines of Creation	Joe Satriani	-
M A R C H	14	From the Bottom to the Top	Sammie	Debut
M A R C H	14	Holy Dogs	Stir	-
M A R C H	14	Maybe I'll Catch Fire	Alkaline Trio	-
M A R C H	14	The Road to El Dorado	Elton John	Soundtrack
M A R C H	14	Winners Never Quit	Pedro the Lion	-
M A R C H	15	Ice Cycles	Platypus	-
M A R C H	16	Believo!	Enon	Debut
M A R C H	16	The Closer You Get	Six by Seven	-
M A R C H	20	The Noise Made by People	Broadcast	-
M A R C H	21	24 Hour Roadside Resistance	Against All Authority	-
M A R C H	21	The Covers Record	Cat Power	Covers
M A R C H	21	Da Baddest Bitch	Trina	-
M A R C H	21	Drawing Black Lines	Project 86	-
M A R C H	21	Get Over It	Mr. Big	-
M A R C H	21	Gung Ho	Patti Smith	-
M A R C H	21	Latter Days: Best of Led Zeppelin Volume Two	Led Zeppelin	Compilation
M A R C H	21	Magica	Dio	-
M A R C H	21	Nickel Creek	Nickel Creek	-
M A R C H	21	No Strings Attached	NSYNC	Studio
M A R C H	21	Fishbone and the Familyhood Nextperience Present: The Psychotic Friends Nuttwerx	Fishbone	-
M A R C H	21	Reinventing the Steel	Pantera	-
M A R C H	21	SMPT:e	Transatlantic	-
M A R C H	21	Spend a Night in the Box	The Reverend Horton Heat	-
M A R C H	21	War & Peace Vol. 2 (The Peace Disc)	Ice Cube	-
M A R C H	21	We Have the Facts and We're Voting Yes	Death Cab for Cutie	-
M A R C H	23	Killermachine	Peter Pan Speedrock	-
M A R C H	26	Perdition City	Ulver	-
M A R C H	27	Is There Anybody Out There? The Wall Live 1980-81	Pink Floyd	Live
M A R C H	27	Drawn from Memory	Embrace	-
M A R C H	27	Engelbert At His Very Best	Engelbert Humperdinck	Compilation
M A R C H	27	Punishing Kiss	Ute Lemper	-
M A R C H	28	The Exies	The Exies	Debut
M A R C H	28	From the Screen to Your Stereo	A New Found Glory	EP
M A R C H	28	Infinite	Stratovarius	-
M A R C H	28	Like Water for Chocolate	Common	-
M A R C H	28	Opposite of H2O	Drag-On	-
M A R C H	28	Real Live Woman	Trisha Yearwood	-
M A R C H	28	Romeo Must Die	Various Artists	Soundtrack
M A R C H	28	Stage One	Sean Paul	-
M A R C H	28	Stomping Ground	Goldfinger	-
M A R C H	31	Shōso Strip	Ringo Sheena	-

=== April–June ===
Date		Album	Artist	Notes
A P R I L	3	Live & Eclectic	Ronnie Wood	Live
A P R I L	3	Lost Souls	Doves	Debut
A P R I L	3	The Menace	Elastica	-
A P R I L	3	The Power	Vanessa Amorosi	-
A P R I L	4	Auto Code 3	Auto Boys 400	-
A P R I L	4	Beyond	Joshua Redman	-
A P R I L	4	Can't Take Me Home	Pink	Debut
A P R I L	4	Dongs of Sevotion	Smog	-
A P R I L	4	Ecstasy	Lou Reed	-
A P R I L	4	Garage D'Or	Cracker	-
A P R I L	4	Grow Your Own	ThaMuseMeant	-
A P R I L	4	Nickels For Your Nightmares	The Headstones	-
A P R I L	4	Of One Blood	Shadows Fall	-
A P R I L	4	The For Carnation	The For Carnation	-
A P R I L	4	WYSIWYG	Chumbawamba	-
A P R I L	4	Yeeeah Baby	Big Pun	-
A P R I L	10	Buy Now... Saved Later	One Minute Silence	-
A P R I L	10	Heliocentric	Paul Weller	UK
A P R I L	10	Things to Make and Do	Moloko	-
A P R I L	10	Veni Vidi Vicious	The Hives	-
A P R I L	11	Beethoven's Last Night	Trans-Siberian Orchestra	-
A P R I L	11	Both Sides of the Brain	Del the Funky Homosapien	-
A P R I L	11	Husslin'	Kardinal Offishall	EP
A P R I L	11	L	Moe	Live
A P R I L	11	L Version 3.1	Moe	Live
A P R I L	11	Return of Saturn	No Doubt	-
A P R I L	11	S Club	S Club	US
A P R I L	11	Special Brew	Bad Manners	Compilation
A P R I L	11	Unrestricted	Da Brat	-
A P R I L	13	Rudeboys inna Ghetto	Buju Banton	Compilation
A P R I L	14	Minor Earth Major Sky	A-ha	-
A P R I L	14	Set It Off	Thousand Foot Krutch	Debut
A P R I L	17	Famous in the Last Century	Status Quo	-
A P R I L	17	Now That's What I Call Music! 45 (UK series)	Various Artists	Compilation
A P R I L	17	Taxidermy	Queen Adreena	-
A P R I L	17	Winds of Creation	Decapitated	Debut
A P R I L	18	The Discovery of a World Inside the Moone	The Apples in Stereo	-
A P R I L	18	Down Here	Tracy Bonham	-
A P R I L	18	Emotional	Carl Thomas	-
A P R I L	18	Figure 8	Elliott Smith	-
A P R I L	18	Greatest Hits	Ace of Base	Compilation
A P R I L	18	Heavy Metal 2000	Various Artists	Soundtrack
A P R I L	18	Let's Make Sure We Kiss Goodbye	Vince Gill	-
A P R I L	18	Live from the Sun	Dokken	Live
A P R I L	18	My Name Is Joe	Joe	-
A P R I L	18	The Piece Maker	Tony Touch	-
A P R I L	18	Stronger Than Death	Black Label Society	-
A P R I L	18	Tripping Daisy	Tripping Daisy	-
A P R I L	18	Victory	Running Wild	-
A P R I L	25	All the Hype That Money Can Buy	Five Iron Frenzy	-
A P R I L	25	Arrasando	Thalía	-
A P R I L	25	After the Eulogy	Boysetsfire	-
A P R I L	25	The Distillers	The Distillers	-
A P R I L	25	Fear of Flying	Mýa	-
A P R I L	25	Gospel Cola	Atomic Opera	-
A P R I L	25	The Heat	Toni Braxton	-
A P R I L	25	Promotional Copy	Reggie and the Full Effect	-
A P R I L	25	Infest	Papa Roach	-
A P R I L	25	Relient K	Relient K	-
A P R I L	25	Silver & Gold	Neil Young	-
A P R I L	25	Skull & Bones	Cypress Hill	-
A P R I L	25	State of Flow	No Fun at All	-
A P R I L	25	Summer Day Reflection Songs	Donovan	Compilation
A P R I L	25	Tanto Tempo	Bebel Gilberto	-
A P R I L	25	Thug Walkin'	Ying Yang Twins	-
A P R I L	25	Useless	Ünloco	-
A P R I L	27	Damned in Black	Immortal	-
A P R I L	28	Hagnesta Hill	Kent	English version. Swedish version released 6 December 1999
M A Y	1	Bardot	Bardot	-
M A Y	1	The Facts of Life	Black Box Recorder	-
M A Y	1	Internal Wrangler	Clinic	-
M A Y	1	The Last Match	The Aislers Set	-
M A Y	2	2000 Years: The Millennium Concert	Billy Joel	Live
M A Y	2	All Hands on the Bad One	Sleater-Kinney	-
M A Y	2	Bachelor No. 2	Aimee Mann	-
M A Y	2	Don't Give Me Names	Guano Apes	-
M A Y	2	Ghost Stories	The Lawrence Arms	-
M A Y	2	Goodfellas	504 Boyz	-
M A Y	2	Homovore	Cattle Decapitation	-
M A Y	2	Pay Attention	The Mighty Mighty Bosstones	-
M A Y	2	The Slash Years	L7	Compilation
M A Y	2	White Pepper	Ween	-
M A Y	4	Half the World Is Watching Me	Mew	-
M A Y	4	My Music at Work	The Tragically Hip	-
M A Y	8	There Goes The Neighborhood	Hush	-
M A Y	9	100 Broken Windows	Idlewild	-
M A Y	9	3 for One	Chris Isaak	Box Set
M A Y	9	The Ballad Collection	Boyz II Men	Compilation
M A Y	9	Everything You Ever Wanted to Know About Silence	Glassjaw	-
M A Y	9	Hot Rail	Calexico	-
M A Y	9	I Wanna Be with You	Mandy Moore	-
M A Y	9	Live at Ernesto's	The Slackers	Live
M A Y	9	Mission Impossible II soundtrack	Various Artists	Soundtrack
M A Y	9	Mob Mentality	The Business/Dropkick Murphys	Split LP
M A Y	9	Mystery White Boy	Jeff Buckley	Live
M A Y	9	The New America	Bad Religion	-
M A Y	9	Open the Door	Roger Hodgson	-
M A Y	9	Smile	The Jayhawks	-
M A Y	9	Survival Sickness	The (International) Noise Conspiracy	-
M A Y	9	Thane to the Throne	Jag Panzer	-
M A Y	9	This Time Around	Hanson	-
M A Y	9	View from Masada	Killah Priest	-
M A Y	9	When All Else Fails	Bracket	-
M A Y	15	Whitney: The Greatest Hits	Whitney Houston	Compilation
M A Y	15	We Are Motörhead	Motörhead	-
M A Y	15	Excuses for Travellers	Mojave 3	-
M A Y	15	Supermodified	Amon Tobin	-
M A Y	16	Beautiful Creature	Juliana Hatfield	-
M A Y	16	Binaural	Pearl Jam	-
M A Y	16	Summer in the City: Live in New York	Joe Jackson	Live
M A Y	16	The Abba Generation	A*Teens	US
M A Y	16	Balance & Options	DJ Quik	-
M A Y	16	Before The Calm	Witness	US; Debut album
M A Y	16	The Big Black	Orange Goblin	-
M A Y	16	Celestial Hi-Fi	Sheavy	-
M A Y	16	Ear-Resistible	The Temptations	-
M A Y	16	The Ever Passing Moment	MxPx	-
M A Y	16	Farmhouse	Phish	-
M A Y	16	The First of the Microbe Hunters	Stereolab	EP
M A Y	16	I Got That Work	The Big Tymers	-
M A Y	16	Invincible	Five	US
M A Y	16	Juliana's Pony: Total System Failure	Juliana Hatfield	-
M A Y	16	The Last Dance	Spice 1	-
M A Y	16	Let's Do It for Johnny!	Bowling for Soup	-
M A Y	16	The Madding Crowd	Nine Days	-
M A Y	16	NYC Ghosts & Flowers	Sonic Youth	-
M A Y	16	Oops!... I Did It Again	Britney Spears	-
M A Y	16	Resolver	Veruca Salt	-
M A Y	16	The Walls Ablaze	Sarah Dougher	-
M A Y	22	Lightbulb Sun	Porcupine Tree	-
M A Y	23	Alma Caribeña	Gloria Estefan	US
M A Y	23	Blazing the Crop	Rae & Christian	US
M A Y	23	the construKction of light	King Crimson	-
M A Y	23	Deathrace King	The Crown	-
M A Y	23	Deviant	Pitchshifter	-
M A Y	23	Inside Job	Don Henley	-
M A Y	23	Love, God and Murder	Johnny Cash	Box Set
M A Y	23	Lucy Pearl	Lucy Pearl	-
M A Y	23	Mad Season	Matchbox Twenty	-
M A Y	23	The Marshall Mathers LP	Eminem	LP
M A Y	23	Masterpiece Theatre	En Vogue	-
M A Y	23	Mer de Noms	A Perfect Circle	-
M A Y	23	Peek & Poke	White Town	-
M A Y	23	The Platform	Dilated Peoples	-
M A Y	23	Please Come Home... Mr. Bulbous	King's X	-
M A Y	23	The Singles Collection, Volume 1	Dropkick Murphys	Compilation
M A Y	23	Slick Shoes/Cooter Split	Slick Shoes/Cooter	Split EP
M A Y	23	Superfast	Dynamite Hack	-
M A Y	23	Vocalcity	Luomo	-
M A Y	23	Wake Up Screaming	Slick Shoes	-
M A Y	23	Wasp Star (Apple Venus Volume 2)	XTC	-
M A Y	23	Wishville	Catherine Wheel	-
M A Y	26	Past Life Trauma (1985–1992)	Kreator	Compilation
M A Y	29	Brave New World	Iron Maiden	-
M A Y	29	Fevers and Mirrors	Bright Eyes	-
M A Y	29	The Sophtware Slump	Grandaddy	-
M A Y	30	Double Wide	Uncle Kracker	-
M A Y	30	dwightyoakamacoustic.net	Dwight Yoakam	-
M A Y	30	High as Hell	Nashville Pussy	-
M A Y	30	The History of Rock	Kid Rock	Compilation +1 new track
M A Y	30	Mermaid Avenue Vol. II	Billy Bragg and Wilco	-
M A Y	30	Mind over Matter	Zion I	-
M A Y	30	Tourist	St Germain	-
J U N E	1	Broken Bracelet	Michelle Branch	-
J U N E	1	Maroon	The Webb Brothers	-
J U N E	5	The Captain	Kasey Chambers	US
J U N E	6	Another Joyous Occasion	Widespread Panic	Live
J U N E	6	Brutal Planet	Alice Cooper	-
J U N E	6	Fold Your Hands Child, You Walk Like a Peasant	Belle & Sebastian	-
J U N E	6	The Holiday Has Been Cancelled	Mad Caddies	EP
J U N E	6	Melody of Certain Damaged Lemons	Blonde Redhead	-
J U N E	6	Nativity in Black II: A Tribute to Black Sabbath	Various Artists	Black Sabbath tribute
J U N E	6	Problematic	ALL	-
J U N E	6	Question in the Form of an Answer	People Under The Stairs	-
J U N E	6	Rated R	Queens of the Stone Age	-
J U N E	6	Reactionary	Face to Face	-
J U N E	6	Tales Out of Luck (Me and the Drummer)	Willie Nelson	-
J U N E	6	Transcendental Blues	Steve Earle	-
J U N E	6	Voyage 34: The Complete Trip	Porcupine Tree	Compilation
J U N E	6	You Think It's Like This but Really It's Like This	Mirah	Debut
J U N E	8	United	Phoenix	Debut
J U N E	12	Bugged	Babybird	-
J U N E	12	OVO	Peter Gabriel	Soundtrack
J U N E	12	7	S Club 7	-
J U N E	12	The Golden D	Graham Coxon	-
J U N E	12	One	Sister2Sister	Debut
J U N E	12	Thirteen Tales From Urban Bohemia	The Dandy Warhols	-
J U N E	13	Crush	Bon Jovi	-
J U N E	13	Faith and Courage	Sinéad O'Connor	-
J U N E	13	Fantastic, Vol. 2	Slum Village	-
J U N E	13	Mo Thugs III: The Mothership	Mo Thugs Family	-
J U N E	13	The Moon & Antarctica	Modest Mouse	-
J U N E	13	Power to the People	Poison	-
J U N E	13	Pump Up the Valuum	NOFX	-
J U N E	13	Riding with the King	B.B. King & Eric Clapton	-
J U N E	13	The Unseen	Quasimoto	Debut
J U N E	13	Z-Ro vs. the World	Z-Ro	-
J U N E	16	Not That Kind	Anastacia	Debut
J U N E	19	Pop Trash	Duran Duran	-
J U N E	19	Standing On The Shoulders Of Giants	Tribe Of Gypsies	-
J U N E	20	Anarchy	Busta Rhymes	-
J U N E	20	Chinese Work Songs	Little Feat	-
J U N E	20	Classical Mushroom	Infected Mushroom	-
J U N E	20	De Stijl	The White Stripes	-
J U N E	20	Does	The Slip	-
J U N E	20	Domestica	Cursive	-
J U N E	20	Down with the Scene	Kid 606	-
J U N E	20	Flash Flash Flash	The Explosion	-
J U N E	20	Hold It Down	Madball	-
J U N E	20	Invincible Summer	k.d. lang	-
J U N E	20	Kaleidoscope Superior	Earthsuit	-
J U N E	20	Let It Go	The Clarks	–
J U N E	20	Let It Go	Galactic Cowboys	–
J U N E	20	Now You See Inside	SR-71	Debut
J U N E	20	One Long Year	Todd Rundgren	-
J U N E	20	One Voice	Billy Gilman	Debut
J U N E	20	Painter's Spring	William Parker	-
J U N E	20	Quality Control	Jurassic 5	-
J U N E	20	The Rising Tide	Sunny Day Real Estate	-
J U N E	20	Thunderstorm	Iron Fire	-
J U N E	20	Universal Migrator Part 1: The Dream Sequencer	Ayreon	-
J U N E	20	Universal Migrator Part 2: Flight of the Migrator	Ayreon	-
J U N E	20	Versus God	Dillinger Four	-
J U N E	20	White Pony	Deftones	-
J U N E	22	The Fists of Time: An Anthology of Short Fiction and Non-Fiction	As Friends Rust	EP
J U N E	22	Sound of Water	Saint Etienne	-
J U N E	26	ØØ Void	Sunn O)))	Debut
J U N E	26	Alone with Everybody	Richard Ashcroft	-
J U N E	26	The Hour of Bewilderbeast	Badly Drawn Boy	-
J U N E	27	Anthology	Chuck Berry	Compilation
J U N E	27	Country Grammar	Nelly	Debut
J U N E	27	Fortress	Sister Hazel	-
J U N E	27	Gift	Taproot	-
J U N E	27	Greatest Hits	Queensrÿche	Compilation
J U N E	27	Half Hour of Power	Sum 41	EP
J U N E	27	High Society	Kottonmouth Kings	-
J U N E	27	Insineratehymn	Deicide	-
J U N E	27	The Notorious K.I.M.	Lil' Kim	-
J U N E	27	Progress	Pedro the Lion	EP
J U N E	27	Tonight and the Rest of My Life	Nina Gordon	Debut
J U N E	?	Bow Down to the Exit Sign	David Holmes	-

=== July–September ===
Date		Album	Artist	Notes
J U L Y	3	If Then Else	The Gathering	-
J U L Y	3	G-A-Y	Various Artists	Compilation, UK
J U L Y	4	Cries of the Past	Underoath	-
J U L Y	4	Days Of The White Owl	The Nerve Agents	-
J U L Y	4	Killswitch Engage	Killswitch Engage	-
J U L Y	4	Space Revolver	The Flower Kings	-
J U L Y	10	Parachutes	Coldplay	UK; Debut
J U L Y	11	Ad Astra	Spiritual Beggars	-
J U L Y	11	Art and Life	Beenie Man	-
J U L Y	11	New Tattoo	Mötley Crüe	-
J U L Y	11	Live on Stage	Chuck Berry	Live
J U L Y	11	Nutty Professor II: The Klumps	Various Artists	-
J U L Y	11	Offerings: A Worship Album	Third Day	-
J U L Y	11	Out of Control	Anti-Nowhere League	-
J U L Y	11	Somewhere to Elsewhere	Kansas	-
J U L Y	11	Songs from an American Movie Vol. One: Learning How to Smile	Everclear	-
J U L Y	11	Sonic Jihad	Snake River Conspiracy	Debut
J U L Y	11	Swing Set	Ani DiFranco	EP
J U L Y	11	Wasting Time	Mest	-
J U L Y	12	Lunacy	Luna Sea	-
J U L Y	12	Walk of Life	Billie Piper	Japan
J U L Y	13	1956	Soul-Junk	-
J U L Y	17	In Blue	The Corrs	-
J U L Y	17	Who Needs Guitars Anyway?	Alice DeeJay	UK
J U L Y	18	2000 B.C.	Canibus	-
J U L Y	18	City of Syrup	Big Moe	-
J U L Y	18	From the Darkness into the Light	Mellow Man Ace	-
J U L Y	18	The Leprechaun	Lil' Flip	-
J U L Y	18	The Mark of the Judas	Darkest Hour	-
J U L Y	18	MobySongs 1993–1998	Moby	Compilation
J U L Y	18	Now That's What I Call Music! 4 (U.S. series)	Various Artists	Compilation
J U L Y	18	Pokémon the Movie 2000: The Power of One: Music From and Inspired by the Motion Picture	Various Artists	Soundtrack
J U L Y	18	Stay Out of Order	The Casualties	-
J U L Y	18	This Business of Art	Tegan and Sara	-
J U L Y	18	Who Is Jill Scott? Words and Sounds Vol. 1	Jill Scott	Debut
J U L Y	18	Wishmaster	Nightwish	-
J U L Y	20	Punk-O-Rama 5	Various Artists	Compilation
J U L Y	24	Live at Brixton Academy	Atari Teenage Riot	Live
J U L Y	25	Clayman	In Flames	-
J U L Y	25	Covenant	UFO	-
J U L Y	25	Disconnected	Fates Warning	-
J U L Y	25	The Ecleftic: 2 Sides II a Book	Wyclef Jean	-
J U L Y	25	The Greyest of Blue Skies	Finger Eleven	-
J U L Y	25	Left and Leaving	The Weakerthans	-
J U L Y	25	Outbound	Béla Fleck and the Flecktones	-
J U L Y	25	The Savage Poetry	Edguy	-
J U L Y	25	Who Let the Dogs Out	Baha Men	-
J U L Y	25	Horrorscope	Eve 6	-
J U L Y	31	Ronan	Ronan Keating	-
J U L Y	?	The Real Thing	Midnight Oil	Live
J U L Y	?	The Hunter	Persuader	-
A U G U S T	1	Almost Human	Voltaire	-
A U G U S T	1	The Big Picture	Big L	-
A U G U S T	1	Fragments of Freedom	Morcheeba	-
A U G U S T	1	Rancid	Rancid	-
A U G U S T	1	Spirit They're Gone, Spirit They've Vanished	Animal Collective	Debut
A U G U S T	1	Vavoom!	The Brian Setzer Orchestra	-
A U G U S T	7	Summer's Stellar Gaze	Silverstein	EP
A U G U S T	8	Moment of Glory	Scorpions	With Berlin Philharmonic Orchestra
A U G U S T	8	Deaf Forever: The Best of Motörhead	Motörhead	Compilation
A U G U S T	8	Resurrection	Halford	-
A U G U S T	8	1000 Hurts	Shellac	-
A U G U S T	8	Art Official Intelligence: Mosaic Thump	De La Soul	-
A U G U S T	8	Hot Shot	Shaggy	-
A U G U S T	8	To Hell and Back	Sinergy	-
A U G U S T	8	Until the Ink Runs Out	Eighteen Visions	-
A U G U S T	10	Ace Troubleshooter	Ace Troubleshooter	-
A U G U S T	14	Little Kix	Mansun	-
A U G U S T	14	Raging Speedhorn	Raging Speedhorn	-
A U G U S T	15	Consent to Treatment	Blue October	-
A U G U S T	15	Dubbing with the Banton	Buju Banton	Remix
A U G U S T	15	The Goldberg Variations	Uri Caine Ensemble	-
A U G U S T	15	Into the Abyss	Hypocrisy	-
A U G U S T	15	Pimp to Eat	Analog Brothers	Debut
A U G U S T	15	Souls Aflame	O.A.R.	-
A U G U S T	15	Water to Drink	Victoria Williams	-
A U G U S T	15	We Still Crunk!	Lil Jon & the Eastside Boyz	-
A U G U S T	15	Wheatus	Wheatus	Debut
A U G U S T	21	Liverpool Sound Collage	Paul McCartney	-
A U G U S T	22	Balls	Sparks	-
A U G U S T	22	Broke	Hed PE	-
A U G U S T	22	False Cathedrals	Elliott	-
A U G U S T	22	L.D. 50	Mudvayne	-
A U G U S T	22	Playmate of the Year	Zebrahead	-
A U G U S T	22	A Retrospective	KRS-One	Compilation
A U G U S T	22	Steppin' Out	Cleopatra	-
A U G U S T	22	Super Hits	Donovan	Compilation
A U G U S T	22	Unchained Spirit	Buju Banton	-
A U G U S T	22	V	Spock's Beard	-
A U G U S T	22	When Incubus Attacks Volume 1	Incubus	EP
A U G U S T	22	Young World: The Future	Lil Zane	Debut
A U G U S T	25	ID; Peace B	BoA	Debut
A U G U S T	28	Sing When You're Winning	Robbie Williams	-
A U G U S T	28	The Best Of	Motörhead	Compilation
A U G U S T	29	Emotion Is Dead	The Juliana Theory	-
A U G U S T	29	Genuine	Stacie Orrico	-
A U G U S T	29	La Luna	Sarah Brightman	-
A U G U S T	29	Look What I Almost Stepped In...	The Vandals	-
A U G U S T	29	Mas Borracho	Infectious Grooves	-
A U G U S T	29	R.A.W	Daz Dillinger	-
A U G U S T	29	Set it Off	Shuvel	-
A U G U S T	29	The Supremes	The Supremes	Box Set
A U G U S T	29	2gether: Again	2gether	-
A U G U S T	29	Woody's Roundup	Riders in the Sky	-
A U G U S T	29	You Were Here	Sarah Harmer	-
A U G U S T	30	Chrysalis	Anggun	-
A U G U S T	30	Real	L'Arc-en-Ciel	-
S E P T E M B E R	4	Gold: The Best of Spandau Ballet	Spandau Ballet	Compilation
S E P T E M B E R	4	Everything, Everything	Underworld	Live
S E P T E M B E R	4	Ghost Stories	Amanda Ghost	UK; Debut
S E P T E M B E R	4	Odyssey Number Five	Powderfinger	-
S E P T E M B E R	5	Machina II/The Friends & Enemies of Modern Music	The Smashing Pumpkins	-
S E P T E M B E R	5	Black Seeds of Vengeance	Nile	-
S E P T E M B E R	5	Evan and Jaron	Evan and Jaron	-
S E P T E M B E R	5	Float	Aesop Rock	-
S E P T E M B E R	5	Gizmodgery	Self	-
S E P T E M B E R	5	Heartbreaker	Ryan Adams	-
S E P T E M B E R	5	Hyacinths and Thistles	The 6ths	-
S E P T E M B E R	5	Loud Rocks	Various Artists	Compilation
S E P T E M B E R	5	The Paper Route	Mack 10	-
S E P T E M B E R	5	People Get Ready	The Mooney Suzuki	-
S E P T E M B E R	5	The Teaches of Peaches	Peaches	-
S E P T E M B E R	5	Trapped in Crime	C-Murder	-
S E P T E M B E R	6	Gold and Green	OOIOO	-
S E P T E M B E R	11	Sci-Fi	Christian McBride	-
S E P T E M B E R	11	Simplicity Two Thousand	Afterlife	-
S E P T E M B E R	11	Felt Mountain	Goldfrapp	-
S E P T E M B E R	12	13 Ways to Bleed on Stage	Cold	-
S E P T E M B E R	12	Four Cornered Night	Jets to Brazil	-
S E P T E M B E R	12	Freaked Out and Small	The Presidents of the United States of America	-
S E P T E M B E R	12	Free Your Soul and Save My Mind	Suicidal Tendencies	-
S E P T E M B E R	12	G.O.A.T.	LL Cool J	-
S E P T E M B E R	12	The Good, the Bad, and the Funky	Tom Tom Club	-
S E P T E M B E R	12	Hellos & Goodbyes	Buck-O-Nine	Live
S E P T E M B E R	12	I	Nightingale	-
S E P T E M B E R	12	It's Like This	Rickie Lee Jones	-
S E P T E M B E R	12	The Jimi Hendrix Experience	Jimi Hendrix	Box Set
S E P T E M B E R	12	King James Version	Harvey Danger	-
S E P T E M B E R	12	Maroon	Barenaked Ladies	-
S E P T E M B E R	12	Mi Reflejo	Christina Aguilera	Spanish-language
S E P T E M B E R	12	The Museum of Imaginary Animals	Pram	-
S E P T E M B E R	12	Music for People	VAST	-
S E P T E M B E R	12	Nathan Michael Shawn Wanya	Boyz II Men	-
S E P T E M B E R	12	Red Dirt Girl	Emmylou Harris	-
S E P T E M B E R	12	Relationship of Command	At the Drive-In	-
S E P T E M B E R	12	Righteous Love	Joan Osborne	-
S E P T E M B E R	12	Symbolic	Voodoo Glow Skulls	-
S E P T E M B E R	12	Twilight As Played By The Twilight Singers	The Twilight Singers	-
S E P T E M B E R	12	Ultimate Collection	Aimee Mann	Compilation
S E P T E M B E R	12	The Worst	Tech N9ne	-
S E P T E M B E R	18	Music	Madonna	-
S E P T E M B E R	18	Selmasongs	Björk	Soundtrack
S E P T E M B E R	18	Vanguard	Finley Quaye	-
S E P T E M B E R	19	14 Diamonds	Stratovarius	Greatest Hits
S E P T E M B E R	19	Confederacy of Ruined Lives	Eyehategod	-
S E P T E M B E R	19	Fearless	Terri Clark	-
S E P T E M B E R	19	The Friends of Rachel Worth	The Go-Betweens	-
S E P T E M B E R	19	The Harsh Light of Day	Fastball	-
S E P T E M B E R	19	Live Cannibalism	Cannibal Corpse	Live
S E P T E M B E R	19	Milk Cow Blues	Willie Nelson	-
S E P T E M B E R	19	The Prodigal Son	Nate Dogg	-
S E P T E M B E R	19	S.D.E.	Cam'ron	-
S E P T E M B E R	19	Solaris	Photek	-
S E P T E M B E R	19	Something Like Human	Fuel	-
S E P T E M B E R	19	The State of New York vs. Derek Murphy	Sadat X	EP
S E P T E M B E R	19	Suitcase: Failed Experiments and Trashed Aircraft	Guided by Voices	Box Set
S E P T E M B E R	19	Timeless: Live in Concert	Barbra Streisand	2xCD; Live
S E P T E M B E R	22	Light Years	Kylie Minogue	-
S E P T E M B E R	25	Arc'tan'gent	Earthtone9	-
S E P T E M B E R	25	A Rock in the Weary Land	The Waterboys	-
S E P T E M B E R	25	Dopethrone	Electric Wizard	-
S E P T E M B E R	25	Enemy of the Music Business	Napalm Death	-
S E P T E M B E R	25	House of Yes: Live from House of Blues	Yes	Live
S E P T E M B E R	25	Into the Light	David Coverdale	UK
S E P T E M B E R	25	Mardraum – Beyond the Within	Enslaved	-
S E P T E M B E R	25	Sailing to Philadelphia	Mark Knopfler	-
S E P T E M B E R	26	Aaron's Party (Come Get It)	Aaron Carter	-
S E P T E M B E R	26	America Town	Five for Fighting	-
S E P T E M B E R	26	Arch Allies: Live at Riverport	REO Speedwagon and Styx	Live
S E P T E M B E R	26	The Art of Drowning	AFI	-
S E P T E M B E R	26	Beware of Dog	Lil' Bow Wow	-
S E P T E M B E R	26	Bridging the Gap	Black Eyed Peas	-
S E P T E M B E R	26	Friends for Schuur	Diane Schuur	-
S E P T E M B E R	26	Good Charlotte	Good Charlotte	Debut
S E P T E M B E R	26	The Hardest Part	Allison Moorer	-
S E P T E M B E R	26	It Was Hot, We Stayed in the Water	The Microphones	-
S E P T E M B E R	26	Jazzmatazz, Vol. 3: Streetsoul	Guru	-
S E P T E M B E R	26	Learning to Breathe	Switchfoot	-
S E P T E M B E R	26	Let's Get Ready	Mystikal	-
S E P T E M B E R	26	The Magnificent Tree	Hooverphonic	-
S E P T E M B E R	26	New American Gospel	Lamb of God	-
S E P T E M B E R	26	New Found Glory	New Found Glory	-
S E P T E M B E R	26	New Train	Paul Pena	delayed 1973 release
S E P T E M B E R	26	Playaz of Da Game	Juvenile	-
S E P T E M B E R	26	Primitive	Soulfly	-
S E P T E M B E R	26	Revelation	98°	-
S E P T E M B E R	26	Shyne	Shyne	Debut
S E P T E M B E R	26	Third Verse	Smalltown Poets	-
S E P T E M B E R	26	Ventilation: Da LP	Phife Dawg	LP
S E P T E M B E R	26	Evening Moods	RatDog	Debut
S E P T E M B E R	27	Duty	Ayumi Hamasaki	-
S E P T E M B E R	27	Q	Mr. Children	-
S E P T E M B E R	?	Darkness Forever!	Turbonegro	US release date; Live

=== October–December ===
Date		Album	Artist	Notes
O C T O B E R	2	The Best of Richard Marx	Richard Marx	Compilation
O C T O B E R	2	Cult	Apocalyptica	-
O C T O B E R	2	DJ-Kicks: Nightmares on Wax	Nightmares on Wax	Compilation
O C T O B E R	2	Hell's Kitchen	Maxim	-
O C T O B E R	2	Kid A	Radiohead	-
O C T O B E R	2	King of the Beach	Chris Rea	-
O C T O B E R	2	On Earth to Make the Numbers Up	Fosca	Debut
O C T O B E R	3	Warning	Green Day	-
O C T O B E R	3	The Very Beast of Dio	Dio	Compilation
O C T O B E R	3	10	Enuff Z'Nuff	Japan
O C T O B E R	3	Destroy the Opposition	Dying Fetus	-
O C T O B E R	3	The Gap	Joan of Arc	-
O C T O B E R	3	If I Could Tell You	Yanni	-
O C T O B E R	3	Inches from the Mainline	Slaves on Dope	-
O C T O B E R	3	The Last of a Dying Breed	Scarface	-
O C T O B E R	3	Melodie Citronique	Blonde Redhead	EP
O C T O B E R	3	Oui	The Sea & Cake	-
O C T O B E R	3	Rhode Island	Pelican City	-
O C T O B E R	3	Sibling Rivalry	The Doobie Brothers	-
O C T O B E R	3	So Much for the Ten Year Plan: A Retrospective 1990-2000	Therapy?	Compilation
O C T O B E R	3	Soul Assassins II	Soul Assassins	-
O C T O B E R	3	Soul Caddy	Cherry Poppin' Daddies	-
O C T O B E R	3	Violent by Design	Jedi Mind Tricks	-
O C T O B E R	3	Vivo	Luis Miguel	Live
O C T O B E R	3	A War Story Book I	Psycho Realm	-
O C T O B E R	3	You Win Again	Van Morrison & Linda Gail Lewis	-
O C T O B E R	3	You're the One	Paul Simon	-
O C T O B E R	9	Black Market Music	Placebo	-
O C T O B E R	9	In the Mode	Roni Size & Reprazent	-
O C T O B E R	9	Lift Your Skinny Fists Like Antennas to Heaven	Godspeed You! Black Emperor	-
O C T O B E R	9	Our Aim Is to Satisfy	Red Snapper	-
O C T O B E R	9	Renegade	HammerFall	-
O C T O B E R	10	5th Dog Let Loose	Flesh-N-Bone	-
O C T O B E R	10	Ain't Life Grand	Slash's Snakepit	-
O C T O B E R	10	Alone in a Crowd	Catch 22	-
O C T O B E R	10	Bette	Bette Midler	-
O C T O B E R	10	Blender	Collective Soul	-
O C T O B E R	10	Blue Moon	Steve Holy	Debut
O C T O B E R	10	Breach	The Wallflowers	-
O C T O B E R	10	The Door	Keb' Mo'	-
O C T O B E R	10	The Height of Callousness	Spineshank	-
O C T O B E R	10	The Very Best of Yanni	Yanni	Compilation
O C T O B E R	10	If I Could Only Fly	Merle Haggard	-
O C T O B E R	10	Rule 3:36	Ja Rule	-
O C T O B E R	10	Statement	Nonpoint	-
O C T O B E R	10	V-The New Mythology Suite	Symphony X	-
O C T O B E R	10	Vapor Transmission	Orgy	-
O C T O B E R	10	Warriorz	M.O.P.	-
O C T O B E R	10	Who Are We Living For?	Dispatch	-
O C T O B E R	13	Big Picture Lies	Sunk Loto	Australia
O C T O B E R	16	Add Insult to Injury	Add N to (X)	-
O C T O B E R	16	Saints & Sinners	All Saints	-
O C T O B E R	16	Back to Mine: Faithless	Faithless	Compilation
O C T O B E R	16	Renaissance	Lionel Richie	-
O C T O B E R	16	Atomhenge 76	Hawkwind	Live
O C T O B E R	16	High Visibility	The Hellacopters	-
O C T O B E R	16	The House of Atreus Act II	Virgin Steele	-
O C T O B E R	17	A Merry Little Christmas	Linda Ronstadt	Christmas
O C T O B E R	17	Iommi	Tony Iommi	-
O C T O B E R	17	American III: Solitary Man	Johnny Cash	-
O C T O B E R	17	Back for the First Time	Ludacris	Debut
O C T O B E R	17	Bedlam Ballroom	Squirrel Nut Zippers	-
O C T O B E R	17	Born to Do It	Craig David	UK
O C T O B E R	17	Chocolate Starfish and the Hot Dog Flavored Water	Limp Bizkit	-
O C T O B E R	17	The Coroner's Gambit	The Mountain Goats	-
O C T O B E R	17	The Curtain Falls: Live At The Flamingo	Bobby Darin	-
O C T O B E R	17	Dead Heart in a Dead World	Nevermore	-
O C T O B E R	17	Deltron 3030	Deltron 3030	Debut
O C T O B E R	17	Dream a Dream	Charlotte Church	-
O C T O B E R	17	Eat at Whitey's	Everlast	-
O C T O B E R	17	Gateways to Annihilation	Morbid Angel	-
O C T O B E R	17	In the Valley of Dying Stars	Superdrag	-
O C T O B E R	17	Lost in the Feeling	Mark Chesnutt	-
O C T O B E R	17	Lounge Against the Machine	Richard Cheese	Covers album
O C T O B E R	17	PS I Love You	Kid 606	-
O C T O B E R	17	The Rose that Grew from Concrete	2Pac	Poetry
O C T O B E R	17	Skinhead Girl	The Specials	Covers album
O C T O B E R	17	Southern Rain	Billy Ray Cyrus	-
O C T O B E R	17	Train of Thought	Reflection Eternal	-
O C T O B E R	18	Casino	Alcazar	-
O C T O B E R	23	The Collector's Series, Volume One	Celine Dion	Compilation
O C T O B E R	23	Right Now	Atomic Kitten	Debut
O C T O B E R	23	Loveboat	Erasure	-
O C T O B E R	23	Folkémon	Skyclad	-
O C T O B E R	23	Lemonjelly.ky	Lemon Jelly	-
O C T O B E R	23	Stories from the City, Stories from the Sea	PJ Harvey	-
O C T O B E R	24	Bedlam Born	Steeleye Span	-
O C T O B E R	24	Borders & Boundaries	Less Than Jake	-
O C T O B E R	24	Capitol Punishment: The Megadeth Years	Megadeth	Compilation
O C T O B E R	24	Days In Avalon	Richard Marx	-
O C T O B E R	24	The Dropper	Medeski, Martin & Wood	-
O C T O B E R	24	The Forbidden Love E.P.	Death Cab for Cutie	EP
O C T O B E R	24	Fozzy	Fozzy	Debut
O C T O B E R	24	Greatest Hits	Lenny Kravitz	Compilation +1 new track
O C T O B E R	24	Hybrid Theory	Linkin Park	Debut
O C T O B E R	24	Just Go Ahead Now: A Retrospective	Spin Doctors	Compilation
O C T O B E R	24	Ladies, Women and Girls	Bratmobile	-
O C T O B E R	24	Live @ the Key Club	Pennywise	Live
O C T O B E R	24	Love Ways	Spoon	EP
O C T O B E R	24	More Light	J Mascis + The Fog	Debut
O C T O B E R	24	My Kind of Christmas	Christina Aguilera	Christmas
O C T O B E R	24	Night and Day II	Joe Jackson	-
O C T O B E R	24	Not the Tremblin' Kind	Laura Cantrell	-
O C T O B E R	24	Play: The B Sides	Moby	Compilation
O C T O B E R	24	Scattered, Smothered and Covered	Hootie & the Blowfish	Covers compilation
O C T O B E R	24	Shine: The Hits	Newsboys	Compilation
O C T O B E R	24	Take a Bite Outta Rhyme: A Rock Tribute to Rap	Various Artists	Rap covers by rock artists
O C T O B E R	24	Ten 13	Sammy Hagar	-
O C T O B E R	24	Whoa, Nelly!	Nelly Furtado	Debut
O C T O B E R	30	All That You Can't Leave Behind	U2	-
O C T O B E R	30	Blur: The Best Of	Blur	Compilation
O C T O B E R	30	Midian	Cradle of Filth	-
O C T O B E R	30	Buzz	Steps	-
O C T O B E R	30	Follow the Reaper	Children of Bodom	-
O C T O B E R	30	The Stone Roses	The Remixes	-
O C T O B E R	31	Awake	Godsmack	-
O C T O B E R	31	Bizaar	Insane Clown Posse	-
O C T O B E R	31	Bizzar	Insane Clown Posse	-
O C T O B E R	31	Christmas Around the World	Bradley Joseph	Christmas
O C T O B E R	31	The Dynasty: Roc La Familia	Jay-Z	-
O C T O B E R	31	The Essential Bob Dylan	Bob Dylan	Compilation
O C T O B E R	31	Flower of Disease	Goatsnake	-
O C T O B E R	31	Freek Show	Twiztid	-
O C T O B E R	31	Gotta Tell You	Samantha Mumba	-
O C T O B E R	31	Haunted	Poe	-
O C T O B E R	31	Kissproof World	Jane Wiedlin	-
O C T O B E R	31	The Least Worst Of	Type O Negative	Compilation with remixes and unreleased tracks
O C T O B E R	31	Liquored Up and Lacquered Down	Southern Culture on the Skids	-
O C T O B E R	31	Made Me Do It	The Haunted	-
O C T O B E R	31	No Name Face	Lifehouse	-
O C T O B E R	31	The Perfect Element, part I	Pain of Salvation	-
O C T O B E R	31	Road Rage	Great Big Sea	-
O C T O B E R	31	Sindustries	Gardenian	-
O C T O B E R	31	Stankonia	OutKast	-
O C T O B E R	31	Tomorrow's Sounds Today	Dwight Yoakam	-
O C T O B E R	31	Underground Vol. 3: Kings of Memphis	Three 6 Mafia	-
O C T O B E R	31	The Very Best of the Specials and Fun Boy Three	The Specials and Fun Boy Three	Compilation
O C T O B E R	31	We Have Come for Your Parents	Amen	-
O C T O B E R	?	Spacebrock	Hawkwind	-
N O V E M B E R	1	Trampled by Lambs and Pecked by the Dove	Trey Anastasio & Tom Marshall	-
N O V E M B E R	3	Cosmic Genesis	Vintersorg	-
N O V E M B E R	4	Origin	Evanescence	-
N O V E M B E R	6	Coast to Coast	Westlife	-
N O V E M B E R	6	Forever	Spice Girls	-
N O V E M B E R	6	Genesis Archive 2: 1976–1992	Genesis	Box Set
N O V E M B E R	6	Halfway Between the Gutter and the Stars	Fatboy Slim	-
N O V E M B E R	6	Planet Pop	ATC	-
N O V E M B E R	6	Swansong for You	Isobel Campbell	-
N O V E M B E R	6	The Unutterable	The Fall	-
N O V E M B E R	7	Châtelet Les Halles	Florent Pagny	-
N O V E M B E R	7	Close to a World Below	Immolation	-
N O V E M B E R	7	The Color of Silence	Tiffany	-
N O V E M B E R	7	El Cancionero Mas y Mas	Los Lobos	Box Set
N O V E M B E R	7	Hits+	Kylie Minogue	Compilation
N O V E M B E R	7	I Need Drugs	Necro	Debut
N O V E M B E R	7	The Mark, Tom, and Travis Show: The Enema Strikes Back	blink-182	Live
N O V E M B E R	7	Myths, Legends, and Other Amazing Adventures, Vol. 2	The Aquabats	Compilation
N O V E M B E R	7	Pure	Gary Numan	-
N O V E M B E R	7	Ride Wit Us or Collide Wit Us	Outlawz	-
N O V E M B E R	7	Rugrats in Paris: The Movie: Music from the Motion Picture	Various Artists	Soundtrack
N O V E M B E R	7	Saturday People	Prozzäk	-
N O V E M B E R	7	The Seventh Song	Steve Vai	Compilation
N O V E M B E R	7	Stilelibero	Eros Ramazzotti	-
N O V E M B E R	7	Strait Up	Snot	-
N O V E M B E R	7	TP-2.com	R. Kelly	-
N O V E M B E R	7	War to End All Wars	Yngwie Malmsteen	-
N O V E M B E R	8	Not Commercial	Cher	-
N O V E M B E R	13	1	The Beatles	Compilation
N O V E M B E R	13	Familiar to Millions	Oasis	Live
N O V E M B E R	13	One Night Only	Elton John	Live
N O V E M B E R	13	Lovers Rock	Sade	-
N O V E M B E R	13	Ghost Tropic	Songs: Ohia	-
N O V E M B E R	13	Seul	Garou	Debut
N O V E M B E R	14	Aijuswanaseing	Musiq	-
N O V E M B E R	14	Bridging the Gap	Charlie Wilson	-
N O V E M B E R	14	The Collection: Volume Two	Bone Thugs-N-Harmony	Compilation
N O V E M B E R	14	Conspiracy of One	The Offspring	-
N O V E M B E R	14	Didn't See Me Coming	Keith Sweat	-
N O V E M B E R	14	Enters the Colossus	Mr. Lif	EP
N O V E M B E R	14	Exposed	Chanté Moore	-
N O V E M B E R	14	Fuse	Colin James	-
N O V E M B E R	14	Holy Wood (In the Shadow of the Valley of Death)	Marilyn Manson	-
N O V E M B E R	14	Musique	Theatre of Tragedy	-
N O V E M B E R	14	My Favorite Headache	Geddy Lee	-
N O V E M B E R	14	Now That's What I Call Music! 5 (U.S. series)	Various Artists	Compilation
N O V E M B E R	14	The Playa Rich Project	Various Artists	Compilation
N O V E M B E R	14	Sound Loaded	Ricky Martin	-
N O V E M B E R	20	Maxi On	Takako Minekawa	-
N O V E M B E R	20	Now That's What I Call Music! 47 (UK series)	Various Artists	Compilation
N O V E M B E R	20	Shut Your Mouth	Frenzal Rhomb	Australia
N O V E M B E R	21	Beer, Bait & Ammo	Kevin Fowler	-
N O V E M B E R	21	Black & Blue	Backstreet Boys	-
N O V E M B E R	21	Bottles to the Ground	NOFX	EP
N O V E M B E R	21	Checkmate	B.G.	-
N O V E M B E R	21	A Day Without Rain	Enya	-
N O V E M B E R	21	Flashback	Electric Light Orchestra	Box Set
N O V E M B E R	21	Freedom	Michael W. Smith	-
N O V E M B E R	21	Greatest Hits	Tim McGraw	Compilation
N O V E M B E R	21	Mama's Gun	Erykah Badu	-
N O V E M B E R	21	Mass Romantic	The New Pornographers	Debut
N O V E M B E R	21	Paradox Addendum	The Crüxshadows	EP
N O V E M B E R	21	The Reunion	Capone-N-Noreaga	-
N O V E M B E R	21	Songs from an American Movie Vol. Two: Good Time for a Bad Attitude	Everclear	-
N O V E M B E R	21	Space Age 4 Eva	8Ball & MJG	-
N O V E M B E R	21	Things Falling Apart	Nine Inch Nails	EP
N O V E M B E R	21	The W	Wu-Tang Clan	-
N O V E M B E R	21	Yours Truly	Sick of It All	-
N O V E M B E R	22	Futurama	Supercar	-
N O V E M B E R	27	The Early Chapters of Revelation	Therion	Box Set
N O V E M B E R	27	The Fake Sound of Progress	Lostprophets	-
N O V E M B E R	27	In a Beautiful Place Out in the Country	Boards of Canada	EP
N O V E M B E R	27	Intermission	dc Talk	Compilation
N O V E M B E R	27	It's All About the Stragglers	Artful Dodger	-
N O V E M B E R	27	One Touch	Sugababes	UK
N O V E M B E R	27	Roll On	The Living End	Australia
N O V E M B E R	27	Since I Left You	The Avalanches	
N O V E M B E R	27	Thelema.6	Behemoth	-
N O V E M B E R	27	Tomorrow Comes Today	Gorillaz	EP
N O V E M B E R	28	Catch the Wind	Donovan	Compilation
N O V E M B E R	28	Dawn of Victory	Rhapsody	-
N O V E M B E R	28	Ghetto Postage	Master P	-
N O V E M B E R	28	Lyricist Lounge 2	Various Artists	Compilation
N O V E M B E R	28	Suburban Light	The Clientele	Debut
N O V E M B E R	?	The Knowing	Novembers Doom	-
D E C E M B E R	1	Human Nature	Human Nature	-
D E C E M B E R	5	Renegades	Rage Against the Machine	Covers Album
D E C E M B E R	5	In the Flesh – Live	Roger Waters	2xCD; Live
D E C E M B E R	5	Live	Alice in Chains	Live
D E C E M B E R	5	O Brother, Where Art Thou?	Various Artists	Soundtrack
D E C E M B E R	5	The Best Of The Doors	The Doors	Compilation
D E C E M B E R	5	Burning Japan Live 1999	Arch Enemy	Live
D E C E M B E R	5	The Dark Ride	Helloween	-
D E C E M B E R	5	3LW	3LW	-
D E C E M B E R	5	Sessions at West 54th: Recorded Live in New York	Keb' Mo'	Live DVD
D E C E M B E R	5	The Understanding	Memphis Bleek	-
D E C E M B E R	6	Eleven	B'z	-
D E C E M B E R	12	Live at the Fillmore	Cypress Hill	Live
D E C E M B E R	12	Paperdoll	Kittie	EP; remix +5 live tracks
D E C E M B E R	12	Restless	Xzibit	-
D E C E M B E R	12	Salival	Tool	Box Set
D E C E M B E R	12	Spiritual Machines	Our Lady Peace	Canada
D E C E M B E R	12	Tangents: The Tea Party Collection	The Tea Party	Compilation
D E C E M B E R	12	Temple of Two Suns	Mob Rules	-
D E C E M B E R	12	X	K-Ci & JoJo	-
D E C E M B E R	15	Flood	Boris	-
D E C E M B E R	19	Tha Last Meal	Snoop Dogg	-
D E C E M B E R	19	Lights Out	Lil Wayne	-
D E C E M B E R	19	Sessions at West 54th	Neil Finn	Live
D E C E M B E R	20	Break the Rules	Namie Amuro	Studio album

=== Release date unknown ===
- Cherry Kicks – Caesars
- Chicks on Speed Will Save Us All – Chicks on Speed
- The Doldrums – Ariel Pink
- Fig.5 – Jackie-O Motherfucker
- Marvin at the Movies – Hank Marvin
- Mountains – Mary Timony
- Still Standing – Yellowcard
- Wicked - Shemekia Copeland

== Biggest hit singles ==
The following songs achieved the highest chart positions in the charts of 2000.

#	Artist	Title	Year	Country	Chart entries
1	Madonna	Music	2000	US	UK 1 – Sep 2000 (23 weeks), US Billboard 1 – Aug 2000 (24 weeks), Japan (Tokyo) 1 – Aug 2000 (25 weeks), Sweden 1 – Aug 2000 (10 weeks), Switzerland 1 – Sep 2000 (15 weeks), Norway 1 – Sep 2000 (10 weeks), Canada RPM 1 for 9 weeks – Sep 2000, New Zealand 1 for 1 week – Oct 2000, Australia 1 for 4 weeks – Aug 2000, Europe 1 for 6 weeks – Sep 2000, Spain 1 for 1 week – Oct 2000, Grammy in 2000 (Nominated), US Platinum (certified by RIAA in Oct 2000), Holland 4 – Aug 2000 (12 weeks), Poland 4 – Aug 2000 (13 weeks), Germany 4 – Aug 2000 (3 months), France Gold (certified by SNEP in Jul 2001), Germany Gold (certified by BMieV in 2000), Austria 6 – Sep 2000 (3 weeks), Belgium 6 – Aug 2000 (11 weeks), Italy 7 of 2000, Brazil 8 of 2000, Australia 11 of 2000, US Radio 15 of 2000 (peak 2 17 weeks), ARC 19 of 2000 (peak 1 16 weeks), Switzerland 19 of 2000, Japan (Osaku) 27 of 2000 (peak 3 16 weeks), US BB 33 of 2000, RYM 33 of 2000, POP 33 of 2000, Party 41 of 1999, Scrobulate 87 of pop, Germany 196 of the 2000s (peak 2 8 weeks), UKMIX 533, Acclaimed 674 (2000)
2	Britney Spears	Oops!... I Did it Again	2000	US	UK 1 – May 2000 (14 weeks), Holland 1 – Apr 2000 (13 weeks), Sweden 1 – Apr 2000 (7 weeks), Switzerland 1 – May 2000 (17 weeks), Norway 1 – May 2000 (14 weeks), Canada RPM 1 for 6 weeks – May 2000, New Zealand 1 for 1 week – Jun 2000, Australia 1 for 2 weeks – May 2000, Europe 1 for 6 weeks – May 2000, Spain 1 for 1 week – Aug 2000, US BB 2 of 2000, Germany 2 – May 2000 (3 months), POP 2 of 2000, Japan (Tokyo) 3 – May 2000 (14 weeks), Austria 3 – May 2000 (4 weeks), Belgium 3 – Apr 2000 (15 weeks), France Gold (certified by SNEP in Jul 2001), Germany Gold (certified by BMieV in 2000), Switzerland 7 of 2000, US Billboard 9 – Apr 2000 (20 weeks), France 10 – May 2000 (1 week), ARC 17 of 2000 (peak 1 17 weeks), US Radio 19 of 2000 (peak 1 14 weeks), Australia 26 of 2000, Italy 34 of 2000, Party 39 of 1999, Brazil 44 of 2000, Germany 154 of the 2000s (peak 2 11 weeks), Acclaimed 2376 (2000)
3	U2	Beautiful Day	2000	Ireland	UK 1 – Oct 2000 (16 weeks), Holland 1 – Sep 2000 (17 weeks), Norway 1 – Oct 2000 (6 weeks), Poland 1 – Sep 2000 (46 weeks), Republic of Ireland 1 for 3 weeks – Oct 2000, Australia 1 for 1 week – Oct 2000, Europe 1 for 2 weeks – Oct 2000, Spain 1 for 1 week – Nov 2000, Grammy in 2000, Japan (Tokyo) 2 – Sep 2000 (24 weeks), MTV Video of the Year 2001 (Nominated), Sweden 3 – Oct 2000 (5 weeks), US Gold (certified by RIAA in May 2005), Switzerland 6 – Oct 2000 (8 weeks), Belgium 8 – Oct 2000 (6 weeks), Italy 12 of 2000, RYM 13 of 2000, US Billboard 21 – Oct 2000 (25 weeks), Germany 21 – Oct 2000 (1 month), Scrobulate 22 of rock, Austria 23 – Nov 2000 (1 week), ARC 37 of 2001 (peak 4 18 weeks), Australia 46 of 2000, Europe 50 of the 2000s (2000), Party 62 of 2007, US Radio 77 of 2001 (peak 19 3 weeks), Brazil 83 of 2000, Virgin 99, TheQ 225, WXPN 471, Acclaimed 1223
4	The Corrs	Breathless	2000	Ireland	UK 1 – Dec 2000 (17 weeks), Sweden 1 – Dec 2000 (10 weeks), Austria 1 – Jan 2001 (5 weeks), Switzerland 1 – Dec 2000 (22 weeks), Republic of Ireland 1 for 6 weeks – Dec 2000, Europe 1 for 10 weeks – Dec 2000, Germany 1 for 1 week – Jan 2001, Spain 1 for 1 week – Feb 2001, Holland 2 – Dec 2000 (11 weeks), Germany 2 – Jan 2001 (4 months), MTV Video of the Year 2001 (Nominated), UK Platinum (certified by BPI in Dec 2000), France Platinum (certified by SNEP in Feb 2001), Germany Platinum (certified by BMieV in 2001), Switzerland 3 of 2001, Norway 3 – Dec 2000 (13 weeks), Belgium 3 – Dec 2000 (13 weeks), Australia 3 of 2001, RYM 3 of 2000, Japan (Tokyo) 18 – Jan 2001 (11 weeks), Italy 26 of 2001, Poland 30 – Jan 2001 (5 weeks), US Billboard 51 – Nov 2000 (15 weeks), Scrobulate 53 of hip-hop, Germany 69 of the 2000s (peak 1 12 weeks), France (InfoDisc) 127 of the 2000s (peak 3, 26 weeks, 398k sales estimated, 2000), Rolling Stone 290, Acclaimed 323 (2000), UKMIX 787
5	Bon Jovi	It's My Life	2000	US	Japan (Tokyo) 1 – Apr 2000 (24 weeks), Holland 1 – May 2000 (14 weeks), Sweden 1 – May 2000 (6 weeks), Switzerland 1 – May 2000 (23 weeks), Poland 1 – Apr 2000 (27 weeks), Belgium 1 – May 2000 (17 weeks), Europe 1 for 4 weeks – Jun 2000, Spain 1 for 1 week – Jul 2000, Japan (Osaku) 2 of 2000 (peak 1 29 weeks), Austria 2 – May 2000 (7 weeks), Germany 2 – May 2000 (4 months), Germany Platinum (certified by BMieV in 2000), UK 3 – Jun 2000 (13 weeks), France 3 – Apr 2000 (2 weeks), Switzerland 3 of 2000, Norway 3 – May 2000 (16 weeks), Italy 3 of 2000, POP 8 of 2001, US BB 11 of 2001, Australia 19 of 2000, Germany 27 of the 2000s (peak 2 16 weeks), US Billboard 33 – Aug 2000 (20 weeks), US Radio 67 of 2000 (peak 14 6 weeks), Party 124 of 1999, RYM 144 of 1999

== Popular songs ==
- "17 Again" – Eurythmics (January 2000)
- "7 Days" – Craig David
- "Aaron's Party (Come Get It)" – Aaron Carter
- "Absolutely (Story of a Girl)" – Nine Days
- "Adam's Song" – Blink-182 (September 5)
- "Again" – Lenny Kravitz (November 14)
- "Against All Odds" – Westlife and Mariah Carey (UK)
- "All the Small Things" – Blink-182 (January 18)
- "American Pie" – Madonna (March 3)
- "A Mil Por Hora" – Lynda Thomas
- "A Puro Dolor" – Son by Four
- "Around the World (La La La La La)" – ATC (May 9)
- "Babylon" – David Gray
- "Back Here" – BBMak
- "Bang Bang Boom" – The Moffatts
- "Bayern" – Die Toten Hosen
- "BEP Empire" – The Black Eyed Peas
- "Be With You" – Enrique Iglesias (March 7)
- "Beautiful Day" – U2 (October 9)
- "Bent" – Matchbox Twenty (July 4 [US])
- "Bohemian Like You" – The Dandy Warhols
- "Boyz-N-The-Hood" – Dynamite Hack
- "Breakout" – Foo Fighters
- "Breathe" – Faith Hill
- "Breathless" – The Corrs (June 14)
- "Butterfly" – Crazy Town
- "Bye Bye Bye" – NSYNC (January 11)
- "Californication" – Red Hot Chili Peppers (May 20)
- "Can I Get A..." – Jay-Z Featuring Ja Rule
- "Can't Fight the Moonlight" – LeAnn Rimes (August 22)
- "Case of the Ex" – Mýa (November 14)
- "Castles in the Sky" – Ian van Dahl (May 2000 [Europe], 2001 [worldwide])
- "Change (In the House of Flies)" – Deftones
- "Come On Over (All I Want Is You)" – Christina Aguilera
- "Coming Around" – Travis (June 5)
- "Country Grammar (Hot Shit)" – Nelly
- "Crash and Burn" – Savage Garden
- "Crazy for This Girl" – Evan and Jaron
- "Dancing in the Moonlight" – Toploader
- "Day & Night" – Billie Piper (May 15)
- "Death Blooms" – Mudvayne
- "Dig" – Mudvayne
- "Doesn't Really Matter" - Janet Jackson
- "Do You Want My Love" - Coco Lee
- "Don't Give Up" – Chicane ft. Bryan Adams
- "Don't Let Me Be The Last To Know" – Britney Spears (January 15)
- "Don't Say You Love Me" – M2M (January 2000)
- "Don't Think I'm Not" - Kandi Burruss
- "Down With The Sickness" – Disturbed
- "Drive" – Incubus
- "Everything You Want" – Vertical Horizon
- "Faded" – SoulDecision
- "Feel Good Hit of the Summer" – Queens of the Stone Age
- "Feel the Beat" – Darude
- "Fill Me In" – Craig David
- "Fly on the Wings of Love" – Olsen Brothers
- "Follow Me" – Uncle Kracker
- "Fool Again" – Westlife
- "Forgot About Dre" – Dr. Dre featuring Eminem
- "Freestyler" – Bomfunk MC's (October 1999 [Finland], February 14, 2000 [worldwide])
- "From the Bottom of My Broken Heart" – Britney Spears (February 1 [US] – February 22 [Aus])
- "Graduation (Friends Forever)" – Vitamin C (July 4)
- "Gravel Pit" – Wu-Tang Clan
- "Groovejet (If This Ain't Love)" – Spiller Feat. Sophie Ellis-Bextor (August 2000 (UK))
- "The Great Beyond" – R.E.M. (November 1999 (US), January 24, 2000 (UK))
- "Hate to Say I Told You So" – The Hives
- "He Loves U Not" – Dream
- "He Wasn't Man Enough" – Toni Braxton
- "Higher" – Creed
- "Hit or Miss" – New Found Glory
- "Holler" – Spice Girls
- "I Disappear" – Metallica
- "I Think I'm in Love with You" – Jessica Simpson (May 18)
- "I Try" – Macy Gray (September 27, 1999 (UK), January 25, 2000 (US))
- "I Turn To You" – Melanie C
- "I Turn To You" – Christina Aguilera
- "I Wanna Be with You" – Mandy Moore
- "If You're Gone" – Matchbox Twenty
- "Incomplete" – Sisqó (June 13)
- "Independent Women Part I" – Destiny's Child (September 4)
- "It Wasn't Me" – Shaggy feat. Rikrok
- "It Feels So Good" – Sonique ( re-released May 2000)
- "It's Gonna Be Me" – NSYNC
- "It's My Life" – Bon Jovi (May 23)
- "It's So Hard" – Big Pun (April 17)
- "Kids" – Robbie Williams and Kylie Minogue (October 9)
- "Komodo (Save a Soul)" – Mauro Picotto
- "Kryptonite" – 3 Doors Down (January 11)
- "L'amour toujours (I'll Fly with You)" – Gigi D'Agostino (July 2000)
- "Lady (Hear Me Tonight)" – Modjo
- "Last Resort" – Papa Roach (September 18)
- "Leader of Men" – Nickelback (March 4)
- "Let's Get Loud" - Jennifer Lopez
- "Life Is a Rollercoaster" – Ronan Keating (July 10)
- "Little Things" – Good Charlotte
- "Loser" – 3 Doors Down
- "The Lost Art of Keeping a Secret" – Queens of the Stone Age
- "Lucky" – Britney Spears (August 4 (UK), August 15 (US))
- "Make Me Bad" – KoЯn
- "Makes No Difference" – Sum 41
- "Mama Told Me Not to Come" – Tom Jones and the Stereophonics
- "Man Overboard" – Blink-182
- "Maria Maria" – Santana (January 25)
- "Minority" – Green Day (October 31)
- "Moi... Lolita" – Alizée (July 4, 2000)
- "Most Girls" – Pink
- "Mr. E's Beautiful Blues" – Eels (February 14 (UK))
- "Ms. Jackson" – Outkast
- "Music" – Madonna (August 21)
- "My Generation" – Limp Bizkit (September 2000)
- "My Love" – Westlife
- "Never Be The Same Again" – Melanie C
- "Never Let You Go" – Third Eye Blind
- "The Next Episode" – Dr. Dre featuring Snoop Dogg
- "On a Night Like This" – Kylie Minogue
- "The One" – Backstreet Boys (May 16) (Millennium album)
- "One More Time" – Daft Punk (November 30)
- "One Step Closer" – Linkin Park
- "Only Time" – Enya
- "Oops!... I Did It Again" – Britney Spears (April 25 [US], May 1 [UK])
- "Original Prankster" – The Offspring (October 24)
- "Otherside" – Red Hot Chili Peppers (January 11)
- "Pinch Me" – Bare Naked Ladies (August 29)
- "Please Stay" – Kylie Minogue (December 11)
- "Private Emotion" – Ricky Martin featuring Meja
- "Pure Shores" – All Saints (February 26)
- "Reach" – S Club 7
- "The Real Slim Shady" – Eminem (May 16)
- "Responsibility" – MxPx
- "Rise" – Gabrielle (January 24(UK) May 2(U.S.))
- "Rock DJ" – Robbie Williams (July 31)
- "Rollin' (Air Raid Vehicle)" – Limp Bizkit (September 2000)
- "Say My Name" – Destiny's Child (February 29 [US], May 16 [UK])
- "Save Me" - Hanson (July 15)
- "Sex Bomb" – Tom Jones featuring Mousse T.
- "Shape of My Heart" – Backstreet Boys (October 31)
- "She Bangs" – Ricky Martin
- "Shine" – Vanessa Amorosi (June 2000)
- "Shiver" – Coldplay
- "Show Me The Meaning of Being Lonely" – Backstreet Boys (Millennium album)
- "So Real (Mandy Moore song)" - Mandy Moore
- "Something Deep Inside" – Billie Piper (September 18)
- "Spinning Around" – Kylie Minogue (June 2000)
- "Stan" – Eminem featuring Dido (December)
- "Stronger" – Britney Spears (November 13 [EUR] December 4 [UK], November 30 [US])
- "Stupify" – Disturbed
- "Summer Jam" – The Underdog Project
- "Sunburn" – Muse
- "Take a Look Around" – Limp Bizkit
- "Teenage Dirtbag" – Wheatus
- "Thank God I Found You" – Mariah Carey featuring Joe and 98 Degrees (January 25 (U.S.), February 28(UK))
- "Thank You for Loving Me" – Bon Jovi (December)
- "There She Goes" – Sixpence None the Richer
- "The Time Is Now" – Moloko
- "Thong Song" – Sisqó (February 15)
- "Trouble" – Coldplay
- "Try Again" – Aaliyah (February 29)
- "Unintended" – Muse
- "Untitled (How Does It Feel)" – D'Angelo (January 1)
- "Voices" – Disturbed
- "Wait and Bleed" – Slipknot (February)
- "Walking Away" - Craig David
- "Warning" – Green Day (December 11)
- "The Way I Am" – Eminem
- "Weekends" – The Black Eyed Peas
- "What's Your Fantasy" – Ludacris featuring Shawnna
- "Who Let the Dogs Out?" – Baha Men (July)
- "With Arms Wide Open" – Creed
- "Wonderful" – Everclear
- "Yellow" – Coldplay (June 26)
- ”You Make Me Sick” – Pink
- "You're No Rock n' Roll Fun" – Sleater-Kinney

== Best selling albums of the year in the United States (Soundscan) ==
According to Soundscan, the best selling album of 2000 was No Strings Attached by NSYNC, selling nearly 10 million copies.

Rank	Album	Artist	Sales (in millions)
1	No Strings Attached	NSYNC	9.9
2	The Marshall Mathers LP	Eminem	7.9
3	Oops!... I Did It Again	Britney Spears	7.8
4	Human Clay	Creed	6.6
5	Supernatural	Santana	5.9
6	1	The Beatles	5.1
7	Country Grammar	Nelly	5.1
8	Black & Blue	Backstreet Boys	4.2
9	2001	Dr. Dre	3.9
10	The Writing's on the Wall	Destiny's Child	3.8

== Opera ==
- Michael Abels – Homies and Popz
- John Coolidge Adams – El Niño (opera-oratorio)
- Peter Maxwell Davies – Mr Emmet Takes a Walk
- Carlisle Floyd – Cold Sassy Tree
- Cristóbal Halffter – Don Quijote
- Jake Heggie – Dead Man Walking
- Michael Nyman – Facing Goya
- Kaija Saariaho – L'Amour de loin
- Richard Thomas – Tourette's Diva

== Musical theater ==
- Aida – Broadway production opened at the Palace Theatre and ran for 1852 performances
- The Dead – Broadway production opened at the Belasco Theatre and ran for 120 performances
- The Full Monty – Broadway production opened at the Eugene O'Neill Theatre and ran for 770 performances
- Jane Eyre – Broadway production opened at the Brooks Atkinson Theatre and ran for 209 performances
- The Music Man (Meredith Willson) – Broadway revival
- Seussical – Broadway production opened at the Richard Rodgers Theatre and ran for 198 performances
- The Sapphire Necklace – Midway Village premiere

== Musical film ==
- Almost Famous
- Dancer in the Dark (Danser i mørket), starring Björk
- Darling Darling
- Escaflowne, with music by Yoko Kanno, Hajime Mizoguchi and Inon Zur
- The Filth and the Fury
- Help! I'm a Fish, with music by Søren Hyldgaard
- Kandukondain Kandukondain
- Nuvvu Vastavani
- Songcatcher
- The Road to El Dorado (animation)
- The Tigger Movie released February 10
- The Fantasticks released September 22, starring Joel Grey
- Thenkasipattanam
- Turn It Up

== Births ==
- January 1
  - Ice Spice, American rapper
  - Odetari, American rapper, singer, songwriter, and record producer
  - Wennely Quezada, American singer (3Quency)
- January 5
  - Big Baby Tape, Russian rapper, songwriter and record producer
  - Roxen, Romanian singer
- January 6 – Shuhua, Taiwanese singer ((G)I-DLE)
- January 8 – Noah Cyrus, American singer, songwriter, actress, activist (sister of Miley Cyrus and Trace Cyrus, and daughter of Billy Ray Cyrus)
- January 9
  - Flo Milli, American rapper and songwriter
  - Toosii, American rapper
- January 10 - Reneé Rapp, American singer-songwriter and actress
- January 18 – Rei(c)hi, Japanese rapper
- January 20 – Mike Singer, German singer-songwriter
- January 27 – Bailey Zimmerman, American singer
- January 30
  - Benee, New Zealand singer-songwriter, musician, and activist
  - Daniela Villarreal, Mexican guitarist, singer, songwriter
- February 4 – Gigi Perez, American singer-songwriter
- February 9 – Mads Christian, Danish singer
- February 10 – Jonathan Mergui, Israeli singer, songwriter and dancer
- February 11 – Baby Storme, American singer
- February 12 – María Becerra, Argentine singer
- February 14
  - Andrea Koevska, Macedonian singer
  - Catie Turner, American singer
- February 16 – Koffee, Jamaican reggae singer, songwriter, rapper, DJ and guitarist
- February 19 – Giorgos Kakosaios, Greek singer
- February 19 – Chisaki Morito, Japanese singer and dancer (Morning Musume)
- February 26 – Yeat, American rapper
- February 27
  - Tsuyoshi Furukawa, Japanese singer and actor (SUPER★DRAGON)
  - Dasha, American singer-songwriter and musician
- February 28
  - Kyohei Takahashi, Japanese singer and actor (Naniwa Danshi)
  - Kaya Stewart, English-American singer and songwriter
- March 5 – Gabby Barrett, American singer
- March 10
  - ChriseanRock, American rapper
  - Roko Blažević, Croatian singer
- March 15 – Kristian Kostov, Russian/Bulgarian singer-songwriter
- March 20 – Hyunjin, South Korean singer and dancer (Stray Kids)
- March 23 – Renjun, Chinese singer (NCT)
- March 25 – Omer Fedi, Israeli guitarist, songwriter and producer (24kGoldn, Machine Gun Kelly, Iann Dior)
- March 27 – Halle Bailey, American singer-songwriter, actress and member of duo Chloe x Halle
- March 28 – Aleyna Tilki, Turkish singer
- March 29 – Jireel, Swedish rapper
- March 30
  - Marius Yo, Japanese singer-songwriter and actor (Sexy Zone)
  - Uncle Waffles, Swazi-born DJ and record producer
- April 3 – Koba LaD, French rapper
- April 7 – Big Scarr, American rapper (d. 2022)
- April 8 – Don Xhoni, Kosovo-Albanian rapper
- April 9 – Jackie Evancho, American classical crossover singer
- April 10 – Surf Mesa, American electronic musician
- April 11
  - Karina, South Korean singer and dancer (aespa)
  - Ken Carson, American rapper, singer and record producer
- April 12
  - Manuel Turizo, Colombian singer
  - Teya, Austrian singer
- April 13 – Khea, Argentine trap singer
- April 20
  - Klara Hammarström, Swedish singer
  - HorsegiirL, German DJ, singer, and songwriter
- April 21 – Underscores, American singer-songwriter and producer
- April 23
  - Jeno, South Korean singer and dancer (NCT)
  - Junior H, Mexican singer–songwriter
- April 24 – Millie B, British rapper
- April 25 – Penelope Scott, American musician, singer-songwriter, and producer
- April 26 – Unique Salonga, – Filipino musician and singer-songwriter
- April 27 – Be'O, South Korean rapper
- April 28 – Victoria De Angelis, Italian bassist (Måneskin)
- May 1
  - Rema, Nigerian rapper and singer-songwriter
  - 9lokkNine, American rapper
- May 7 – Eden Alene, Israeli singer
- May 13 - Antonio Cipriano, American actor and singer
- May 16 - Theo Evan, Greek Cypriot singer-songwriter
- May 18 – Carlie Hanson, American musician and YouTuber
- May 20
  - Rosa Linn, Armenian singer-songwriter
  - Rusherking, Argentine rapper
- May 26 – Yeji, South Korean singer and dancer (Itzy)
- May 28 – Maisie Peters, English "Emo Girl Pop" singer-songwriter, musician, and YouTuber
- June 2 – MC Jottapê, Brazilian singer-songwriter and actor
- June 3 – beabadoobee, Filipino-English indie singer-songwriter
- June 6
  - Haechan, South Korean singer (NCT)
  - Cat Burns, English rapper
  - BabyTron, American rapper
  - Vaundy, Japanese musician
- June 8 – Charlotte Lawrence, American singer-songwriter, model
- June 13 – Hotboii, American rapper and songwriter
- June 15
  - Ouyang Nana, Taiwanese actress, singer and musician
  - Jérémie Makiese, Belgian singer
- June 16 – Tay-K, American rapper and songwriter
- June 22 – Jordana, American bedroom pop musician
- June 29 – Digga D, English rapper songwriter
- July 5 – Faouzia, Moroccan-Canadian singer-songwriter and musician
- July 7 – HAON, South Korean rapper
- July 9 – mxmtoon, Chinese-American singer songwriter, musician and YouTuber
- July 14
  - Mata, Polish rapper and songwriter
  - Maia Reficco, American singer and actress
- July 18 – Sarah Kinsley, American singer
- July 21 – Lia, South Korean singer (Itzy)
- July 23
  - Libianca, Cameroonian-American singer
  - Mimi Webb, British singer songwriter
- July 28
  - Mero, German rapper and songwriter
  - Audrey Mika, American singer and songwriter.
- July 29 - Kaliii, American rapper
- August 1
  - Lil Loaded, American rapper (d. 2021)
  - Kim Chaewon, South Korean singer (Le Sserafim)
- August 3 – Ron Suno, American rapper and songwriter
- August 9 – Arlo Parks, English singer-songwriter and poet
- August 13 – Jaemin, South Korean singer (NCT)
- August 15 – Lexi Jones, English-American artist and musician (daughter of David Bowie and Iman brother of Duncan Jones)
- August 17
  - Lil Pump, American rapper, record producer, and songwriter
  - Thomas Headon, British-born Australian singer-songwriter
- August 24 - Brianna Mazzola, American singer and actress (3Quency)
- August 25
  - Vincenzo Cantiello, Italian singer
  - Nicki Nicole - Argentine singer
  - Nick Mira, American record producer and songwriter (Juice Wrld, Lil Uzi Vert, XXXTentacion)
- August 26 – ZK, Danish rapper
- September 6 – David Kushner, American singer
- September 12 – Laine Hardy, American singer
- September 13 – Emmy, Norwegian singer-songwriter
- September 14 – Han Jisung, South Korean rapper, singer-songwriter and record producer (Stray Kids)
- September 15 – Fêlix, Australian-Korean rapper (Stray Kids)
- September 18 – Alex Warren, American singer, songwriter, youtuber, and influencer
- September 22
  - Kankan, American rapper
  - Seungmin, South Korean singer (Stray Kids)
- September 24 – Marco Ip, Hong Kong singer (P1X3L)
- September 25 – Ikura, American-Japanese singer (Yoasobi)
- September 28 – Frankie Jonas, American singer and actor
- October 2 – Quadeca, American rapper
- October 4 – Lunay, Puerto Rican singer-songwriter
- October 6 – Zoë Më, Swiss singer and songwriter
- October 8 – Ethan Torchio, Italian drummer and composer (Måneskin)
- October 10 – Yangyang, Taiwanese singer (NCT, WayV)
- October 12 – Jongho, South Korean singer and actor (Ateez)
- October 13 – Lydia Night, American singer and rhythm guitarist, member of pop rock band The Regrettes
- October 18 – Sophie Thatcher, American actress and musician
- October 21
  - Imanbek, Kazakh DJ and record producer
  - Popp Hunna, American rapper
- October 22
  - Baby Keem, American rapper, songwriter, and record producer (Black Panther (soundtrack), The Lion King: The Gift)
  - Weiland, American rapper, singer, music producer, and songwriter
- October 23 – Hanna Ferm, Swedish singer
- October 27 – Claudia Emmanuela Santoso, Indonesian singer
- October 28 – Aydan Calafiore, Australian singer
- October 30
  - Giselle, Japanese singer-songwriter and rapper (aespa)
  - TuralTuranX, Azerbaijani brothers duo
- October 31 – Willow Smith, American singer-songwriter, rapper, activist, actress and dancer (daughter of Will Smith and Jada Pinkett Smith, sister of Jaden Smith)
- November 2 – Junna, Japanese singer
- November 5 – Yuval Raphael, Israeli singer
- November 8
  - Jasmine Thompson, English singer
  - Roy Wang, Chinese singer-songwriter, television host and actor
  - S10, Dutch singer, rapper and songwriter
- November 10 - Vincent Mason, American country music singer and guitarist
- November 13 – 24kGoldn, American rapper and songwriter
- November 20 – Connie Talbot, English singer
- November 21 - Crayon, Nigerian singer
- November 22
  - Baby Ariel, American singer, actress and social media personality
  - Ansonbean, Hong Kong singer and actor
- November 25 - Shotaro, Japanese singer and dancer (Riize)
- November 26 - Tali Golergant, Israeli-born Luxembourgish singer, songwriter, actress and vocal coach
- November 28 - Jackson Yee, Chinese actor and singer
- December 3 – Iru Khechanovi, Georgian singer
- December 5 - Soobin, South Korean singer (TXT)
- December 7
  - Niko B, English rapper and musician
  - Ellie Banke, American singer-songwriter
- December 12 – B-Lovee, American rapper
- December 17 – Miriana Conte, Maltese singer
- December 22
  - Joshua Bassett, American singer and actor
  - Sematary, American rapper, singer, songwriter, and record producer
- December 24 – Ethan Bortnick, American pianist, singer-songwriter, record producer and musician
- December 26 – Isac Elliot, Finland-Swedish singer, songwriter and dancer
- December 28
  - Larissa Manoela, Brazilian actress, singer and songwriter
  - Lee Mujin, South Korean folk Singer
- December 29 – Eliot Vassamillet, Belgian singer

== Deaths ==
- January 2 – Nat Adderley (68), jazz cornet and trumpet player
- January 16 – Gene Harris (67), jazz pianist
- January 19
  - Irra Petina (91), operatic contralto
  - Josh Clayton-Felt (32), singer-songwriter (choriocarcinoma)
- January 22 – Carlo Cossutta (67), operatic tenor
- February 3 – Alla Rakha (80), tabla player
- February 4 – Doris Coley (58), vocalist (the Shirelles)
- February 7
  - Big Punisher (28), rapper (heart attack)
  - Dave Peverett (56) (Foghat)
- February 11 – Lord Kitchener (77), calypsonian
- February 12
  - Screamin' Jay Hawkins (70), U.S. vocal artist
  - Andy Lewis (33), Australian bass player (The Whitlams) (b. 1967)
  - Oliver (54), U.S. singer (b. 1945)
- February 19 – Marin Goleminov (91), violinist and composer
- February 23 – Ofra Haza (42), singer
- February 29 – Dennis Danell (38), guitarist (Social Distortion) (brain aneurysm)
- March 4 – Walter Dana (97), polka-music promoter
- March 5 – Alexander Young (79), operatic tenor
- March 7 – Pee Wee King (86), country musician and songwriter (heart attack)
- March 20 – Gene "Eugene" Andrusco (38), actor and singer (brain aneurysm)
- March 27 – Ian Dury (57), English rock musician (liver cancer)
- April 25 – Niels Viggo Bentzon (80), Danish composer
- April 27 – Vicki Sue Robinson (45), US disco singer (cancer)
- May 2 – Sundar Popo (56), Indo-Trinidadian chutney musician (heart and kidney ailment relating to diabetes)
- May 13 – Cesare Valletti (77), operatic tenor
- May 20 – Jean-Pierre Rampal (78), flautist
- May 31 – Johnnie Taylor (66), singer
- June 1 – Tito Puente (77), Afro-Cuban jazz and salsa musician
- June 7 – James Moore (44), gospel singer
- June 14 – Paul Griffin (62), pianist
- June 21 – Alan Hovhaness (89), American composer
- June 25 – Wilson Simonal (62), Brazilian singer
- July 5 – Lord Woodbine (Harold Adolphus Phillips) (71), calypsonian
- July 6
  - Ľudovít Rajter (93), Slovak composer and conductor
  - Władysław "Władek" Szpilman (88), Jewish-Polish pianist who survived the Holocaust
- July 11 – Jaroslav Filip (51), Slovak musician, actor
- July 15 – Paul Young (53), English singer and percussionist of Sad Café and Mike + The Mechanics (heart attack)
- July 24 – Oscar Shumsky (83), violinist
- July 28 – Jerome Smith (KC and the Sunshine Band)
- August 2 - Edward A. Baird (67), operatic bass and voice teacher
- August 10 – Suzanne Danco (89), operatic soprano
- August 13 – Nazia Hassan (34), iconic Pakistani singer (lung cancer)
- August 25
  - Jack Nitzsche (63), arranger, producer, songwriter and composer
  - Allen Woody (44), bass guitarist
- September 12 – Stanley Turrentine (66), jazz saxophonist
- September 21 – Bengt Hambraeus (72), composer for organ
- September 25 – Tommy Reilly (81), harmonica virtuoso
- September 26 – Carl Sigman (91), songwriter
- October 1
  - Robert Allen (73), American pianist and composer (b. 1928)
  - Cub Koda (51), singer, guitarist and songwriter (Brownsville Station)
- October 3 – Benjamin Orr (53), bassist, vocalist of The Cars
- October 17 – Joachim Nielsen (36), Norwegian rock singer in Jokke & Valentinerne
- October 18 – Julie London (74), US singer and actress
- October 21 – Frankie Crocker, radio DJ
- October 27 – Winston Grennan (56), Jamaican drummer
- October 28 – Carlos Guastavino (78), composer
- October 30 – Steve Allen (78), comedian, composer, talk show host, author
- November 8
  - Brian Boydell (83), Irish composer
  - Dick Morrissey (60), UK tenor saxophonist (cancer)
- November 16
  - DJ Screw (29), hip-hop DJ (codeine overdose)
  - Joe C. (26), rapper
- November 30 – Scott Smith (45), bassist (Loverboy) (lost at sea)
- December 17 – Harold Rhodes (89), inventor of Rhodes piano
- December 18 – Kirsty McColl (41), English singer songwriter (speedboat accident)
- December 19
  - Rob Buck (42), guitarist (10,000 Maniacs) (liver disease)
  - Milt Hinton (90), jazz double bassist
  - Pops Staples (85), gospel and R & B musician
- December 24 – Nick Massi (65), bass singer in The Four Seasons
- December 26 - Piotr Łuszcz (22), Polish rapper in Kaliber 44 and Paktofonika (suicide)

== Awards ==
- The following artists are inducted into the Rock and Roll Hall of Fame: Eric Clapton, Earth, Wind & Fire, The Lovin' Spoonful, The Moonglows, Bonnie Raitt and James Taylor
- Inductees of the GMA Gospel Music Hall of Fame include Shirley Caesar, and The Oak Ridge Boys

=== Grammy Awards ===
- Grammy Awards of 2000

=== Country Music Association Awards ===
- 2000 Country Music Association Awards

=== Eurovision Song Contest ===
- Eurovision Song Contest 2000

=== Mercury Music Prize ===
- The Hour of Bewilderbeast – Badly Drawn Boy wins.

=== MTV Video Music Awards ===
- 2000 MTV Video Music Awards

== Charts ==
=== Triple J Hottest 100 ===
- Triple J Hottest 100, 2000

== See also ==
- 2000 in music (UK)
- Record labels established in 2000
