= Live! (Chuck Berry album) =

Live album by Chuck Berry
- Released: 1994
- Recorded: September 1983
- Genre: Rock and roll
- Length: 47:55
- Label: Columbia River

Chuck Berry chronology
20th Century Masters – The Best of Chuck Berry (1999)	Live! (1994)	Anthology (2000)

Live! is a live album by Chuck Berry, released in 1994 by Columbia River Entertainment Group.

Professional ratings
Review scores
Source	Rating
AllMusic	2/5 stars

== Track listing ==
1. "School Days" – 3:09
2. "Sweet Little Sixteen" – 2:58
3. "Roll Over Beethoven" – 3:36
4. "Every Day I Have the Blues" – 4:00
5. "Bio" – 3:01
6. Medley: "Maybellene"/"Mountain Dew" – 2:46
7. "Let It Rock" – 3:42
8. Medley: "Carol"/"Little Queenie" – 4:15
9. "Key to the Highway" – 5:07
10. "Got My Mojo Working" – 3:29
11. "Reelin' and Rockin'" – 8:59
12. "Johnny B. Goode" – 2:53

== Personnel ==
- Chuck Berry – guitar, vocals
- Ingrid Berry - vocals on "Keys to the Highway", "Got My Mojo Working" and "Reelin' and Rockin'"
