= The Great Twenty-Eight =

Greatest hits album by Chuck Berry
- Released: 1982
- Recorded: 1955–1965
- Genre: Rock and roll
- Length: 68:55
- Label: Chess
- Producer: Leonard Chess, Phil Chess

Chuck Berry chronology
| Rockit (1979) | The Great Twenty-Eight (1982) | Chess Masters (1983) |

Alternative cover
- The Great Twenty-Eight: Super Deluxe Edition (2017)

Professional ratings
Review scores
| Source | Rating |
|---|---|
| AllMusic | 5/5 stars |
| The Encyclopedia of Popular Music | 5/5 stars |
| Rolling Stone | 5/5 stars |

The Great Twenty-Eight is a compilation album by American musician Chuck Berry, released in 1982 on Chess Records. In 2003, the album was ranked number 21 on Rolling Stone magazine's list of the 500 greatest albums of all time, maintaining the rating in a 2012 revised list, the second-highest ranking compilation on the list after The Sun Sessions by Elvis Presley. It was ranked number 51 in the 2020 reboot of the list.

Out of print for many years, the compilation was reissued on vinyl by Geffen Records on August 4, 2017, five months after his death. All of its 28 tracks can be found on the 2000 Anthology two-disc set. Geffen later announced a 'Super Deluxe Edition' vinyl reissue, containing the original album, a new compilation 'More Great Chuck Berry', a live album 'Oh Yeah! Live In Detroit', recorded in 1963, and a 10" EP called 'Berry Christmas'.

A survey of Berry's first decade of recording on Chess Records, it contains 21 singles along with six of their B-sides and one album track from Chuck Berry in London. Of those singles, eleven were Top 10 hits on the Billboard R&B singles chart and ten were Top 40 hits on the Billboard Hot 100.

== Track listing ==
All tracks are written by Chuck Berry.

Side one
| No. | Title | Chess source | Length |
|---|---|---|---|
| 1. | "Maybellene" | Chess 1604 A (1955) | 2:18 |
| 2. | "Thirty Days" | Chess 1610 A (1955) | 2:24 |
| 3. | "You Can't Catch Me" | Chess 1645 A (1956) | 2:42 |
| 4. | "Too Much Monkey Business" | Chess 1635 B (1956) | 2:53 |
| 5. | "Brown Eyed Handsome Man" | Chess 1635 A (1956) | 2:17 |
| 6. | "Roll Over Beethoven" | Chess 1626 A (1956) | 2:23 |
| 7. | "Havana Moon" | Chess 1645 B (1956) | 3:05 |

Side two
| No. | Title | Chess source | Length |
|---|---|---|---|
| 1. | "School Days" | Chess 1653 A (1957) | 2:40 |
| 2. | "Rock and Roll Music" | Chess 1671 A (1957) | 2:30 |
| 3. | "Oh Baby Doll" | Chess 1664 A (1957) | 2:33 |
| 4. | "Reelin' and Rockin'" | Chess 1683 B (1958) | 3:14 |
| 5. | "Sweet Little Sixteen" | Chess 1683 A (1958) | 2:55 |
| 6. | "Johnny B. Goode" | Chess 1691 A (1958) | 2:38 |
| 7. | "Around and Around" | Chess 1691 B (1958) | 2:35 |

Side three
| No. | Title | Chess source | Length |
|---|---|---|---|
| 1. | "Carol" | Chess 1700 A (1958) | 2:46 |
| 2. | "Beautiful Delilah" | Chess 1697 A (1958) | 2:08 |
| 3. | "Memphis" | Chess 1729 B (1959) | 2:12 |
| 4. | "Sweet Little Rock and Roller" | Chess 1709 A (1958) | 2:20 |
| 5. | "Little Queenie" | Chess 1722 B (1959) | 2:38 |
| 6. | "Almost Grown" | Chess 1722 A (1959) | 2:19 |
| 7. | "Back in the U.S.A." | Chess 1729 A (1959) | 2:25 |

Side four
| No. | Title | Chess source | Length |
|---|---|---|---|
| 1. | "Let It Rock" | Chess 1747 A (1960) | 1:50 |
| 2. | "Bye Bye Johnny" | Chess 1754 A (1960) | 2:03 |
| 3. | "I'm Talking About You" | Chess 1779 A (1961) | 1:48 |
| 4. | "Come On" | Chess 1799 A (1961) | 1:50 |
| 5. | "Nadine (Is It You?)" | Chess 1883 A (1964) | 2:30 |
| 6. | "No Particular Place to Go" | Chess 1898 A (1964) | 2:44 |
| 7. | "I Want to Be Your Driver" | Chuck Berry in London (1965) | 2:15 |
| Total length: | | | 68:55 |

== Personnel ==
- Chuck Berry – vocals, guitars
- Matt "Guitar" Murphy, Jimmy Rogers, Hubert Sumlin – electric guitars
- Johnnie Johnson, Lafayette Leake, Otis Spann, Paul Williams – piano
- Willie Dixon – bass
- Reggie Boyd, George Smith – bass
- Fred Below, Ebby Hardy, Odie Payne, Jasper Thomas – drums
- Jerome Green – maracas
- Gene Barge, L.C. Davis, James Robinson – saxophones
- Martha Berry, Etta James, The Ecuadors, The Marquees, The Moonglows – backing vocals
