= Teenage Lust =

Teenage Lust may refer to:

- Teen Age Lust (album), an album by MC5
  - "Teenage Lust", a song on that album and their 1970 album Back in the USA
- Teen Lust (1979 film), a film directed by James Hong
- Teen Lust (2014 film), a Canadian film directed by Blaine Thurier
- Teenage Lust, a 1970s New York based glam rock band
- "Teenage Lust", a song by Jesus and Mary Chain from their 1992 album Honey's Dead
- "Teenage Lust", a song by Butch Walker from his 2009 EP Here Comes The...
- Teenage Lust, a book by Larry Clark
