= Live on Stage (Chuck Berry album) =

Live album by Chuck Berry
- Released: 2000
- Recorded: 1983
- Genre: Rock and roll
- Length: 47:55
- Label: Magnum Records

Chuck Berry chronology
Anthology (2000)	Live on Stage (2000)	Blast from the Past: Chuck Berry (2001)

Professional ratings
Review scores
Source	Rating
AllMusic	2.5/5 stars

Live On Stage is a Chuck Berry album released in 2000 by Magnum Records.

== Track listing ==
1. "School Days" – 3:09
2. "Sweet Little Sixteen" – 2:58
3. "Roll Over Beethoven" – 3:36
4. "Every Day I Have The Blues" – 4:00
5. "Bio" – 3:01
6. "Medley: Maybellene/Mountain Dew" – 2:46
7. "Let It Rock" – 3:42
8. "Medley: Carol/Little Queenie" – 4:15
9. "Key to the Highway" – 5:07
10. "Got My Mojo Working" – 3:29
11. "Reelin' & Rockin'" – 8:59
12. "Johnny B. Goode" – 2:53
