= Anthology (Chuck Berry album) =

The Anthology

Greatest hits album by Chuck Berry
- Released: June 27, 2000
- Recorded: May 21, 1955 – December 22, 1969 in Chicago, Illinois; September 28, 1958 in St. Louis; February 3, 1972 at the Lanchester Arts Festival, Coventry, England
- Genre: Rock and roll
- Length: 2:13:16
- Label: Chess
- Producer: Andy McKaie

Chuck Berry chronology
Live! (2000)	The Anthology (2000)	Live on Stage (2000)

Professional ratings
Review scores
Source	Rating
Allmusic	5/5 stars
Robert Christgau	A−
Rolling Stone	5/5 stars

Anthology is a two-disc compilation album by American rock and roll musician Chuck Berry released on July 27, 2000, by Chess Records. It duplicates in its entirety the previous anthology The Great Twenty-Eight ranked at No. 21 on the Rolling Stone 500 greatest all time albums list, as well as the entirety of the later Definitive Collection issued in 2006 as part of the Universal series. The album was later reissued and packaged in 2005 as part of the Universal Records Gold series, and simply retitled Gold. It charted at No. 110 in the UK Albums Chart.

== Content ==
An overview of Berry's Chess recordings, it contains every 45 rpm single released by Berry on the Chess label from his debut in 1955 through March 1965 with the exceptions of the holiday record "Merry Christmas, Baby," "Anthony Boy," "Chuck's Beat" with Bo Diddley, and "Little Marie." This does not include content from every released EP single, but of the 28 A-sides from this time period, 14 were top ten hits on the Billboard R&B singles chart and ten were Top 40 hits on the Billboard Hot 100.

It also includes an additional three singles, "Tulane" from 1970, "Bio" from 1973, and his only No. 1 hit on the Billboard Hot 100, "My Ding-a-Ling" from 1972. After the 31 A-sides, the set's 50 songs total includes eleven b-sides, seven album tracks, and one that appeared on the 1990 rarities compilation, Missing Berries. Four of the b-sides charted independently from their plug side.

Robert Christgau states that although Anthology is less expensive than The Chess Box, it removed several good songs like "Have Mercy Judge" and "Anthony Boy". David McGee, Milo Miles, and Mark Kemp, of Rolling Stone magazine, are of the opinion that Anthology is one of the best of Berry's compilation albums.

== Track listing ==
All tracks written by Chuck Berry, except where noted.

Disc one
No.	Title	Writer(s)	Chess source	Length
1.	"Maybellene"		Chess 1604 A	2:22
2.	"Wee Wee Hours"		Chess 1604 B	3:05
3.	"Thirty Days"		Chess 1610 A	2:24
4.	"You Can't Catch Me"		Chess 1645 A	2:45
5.	"Downbound Train"		Chess 1615 B	2:51
6.	"No Money Down"		Chess 1615 A	2:59
7.	"Brown Eyed Handsome Man"		Chess 1635 A	2:18
8.	"Roll Over Beethoven"		Chess 1626 A	2:24
9.	"Too Much Monkey Business"		Chess 1635 B	2:56
10.	"Havana Moon"		Chess 1645 B	3:09
11.	"School Days"		Chess 1653 A	2:43
12.	"Rock and Roll Music"		Chess 1671 A	2:33
13.	"Oh Baby Doll"		Chess 1664 A	2:39
14.	"Sweet Little Sixteen"		Chess 1683 A	3:03
15.	"Guitar Boogie"		One Dozen Berrys	2:21
16.	"Reelin' and Rockin'"		Chess 1683 B	3:17
17.	"Johnny B. Goode"		Chess 1691 A	2:42
18.	"Around and Around"		Chess 1691 B	2:41
19.	"Beautiful Delilah"		Chess 1697 A	2:11
20.	"House of Blue Lights"	Don Raye, Freddie Slack	Chess 1671 B	2:29
21.	"Carol"		Chess 1700 A	2:50
22.	"Jo Jo Gunne"		Chess 1709 B	2:47
23.	"Memphis"		Chess 1729 B	2:15
24.	"Sweet Little Rock and Roller"		Chess 1709 A	2:24
25.	"Little Queenie"		Chess 1722 B	2:44
26.	"Almost Grown"		Chess 1722 A	2:19

Disc two
No.	Title	Writer(s)	Chess source	Length
1.	"Back in the U.S.A."		Chess 1729 A	2:29
2.	"Do You Love Me"		Missing Berries	2:24
3.	"Betty Jean"		Rockin' at the Hops	2:28
4.	"Childhood Sweetheart"		Chess 1737 A	2:45
5.	"Let It Rock"		Chess 1747 A	1:49
6.	"Too Pooped to Pop"	Billy Davis	Chess 1747 B	2:37
7.	"I Got to Find My Baby"		Chess 1763 A	2:17
8.	"Don't You Lie to Me"	Hudson Whittaker	New Juke Box Hits	2:05
9.	"Bye Bye Johnny"		Chess 1754 A	2:07
10.	"Jaguar and Thunderbird"		Chess 1767 A	1:52
11.	"Down the Road a Piece"	Don Raye	Rockin' at the Hops	2:16
12.	"Confessin' the Blues"	Jay McShann, Walter Brown	Rockin' at the Hops	2:10
13.	"I'm Talking About You"		Chess 1779 A	1:51
14.	"Come On"		Chess 1799 A	1:51
15.	"Nadine (Is It You?)"		Chess 1883 A	2:36
16.	"You Never Can Tell"		Chess 1906 A	2:44
17.	"Promised Land"		Chess 1916 A	2:25
18.	"No Particular Place to Go"		Chess 1898 A	2:44
19.	"Dear Dad"		Chess 1926 A	1:52
20.	"I Want to Be Your Driver"		Chuck Berry in London	2:17
21.	"Tulane"		Chess 2090 A	2:39
22.	"My Ding-a-Ling" (live single edit)	Dave Bartholomew	Chess 2131 A	4:19
23.	"Reelin' and Rockin'" (live)		The London Chuck Berry Sessions	7:04
24.	"Bio"		Chess 2140 A	4:24

== Personnel ==
- Chuck Berry – vocals, guitars
- Matt "Guitar" Murphy, Jimmy Rogers, Hubert Sumlin – electric guitars
- Johnnie Johnson, Lafayette Leake, Otis Spann, Paul Williams —piano
- Willie Dixon – bass
- Reggie Boyd, George Smith – bass
- Fred Below, Ebby Hardy, Odie Payne, Jasper Thomas – drums
- Jerome Green – maracas
- L.C. Davis, James Robinson – saxophone
- Martha Berry, Etta James, The Ecuadors, The Marquees – backing vocals
- Owen McIntyre – guitar on "My Ding-a-Ling" and "Reelin' and Rockin'" (live)
- Dave Kafinetti – piano on "My Ding-a-Ling" and "Reelin' and Rockin'" (live)
- Nic Potter – bass on "My Ding-a-Ling" and "Reelin' and Rockin'" (live)
- Robbie McIntosh – drums on "My Ding-a-Ling" and "Reelin' and Rockin'" (live)
- Stan Bronstein – saxophone on "Bio"
- Adam Ippolito – piano on "Bio"
- Wayne "Tex" Gabriel – guitar on "Bio"
- Gary Van Scyoc – bass on "Bio"
- Rick Frank – drums on "Bio"

Technical personnel

- Leonard Chess, Phil Chess, Esmond Edwards – original recording producers
- Andy McKaie – compilation producer
- Erick Labson – digital remastering
- Vartan – art direction
- Mike Fink – design

== Charts ==
Chart (2017)	Peak position
France (Syndicat National de l'Édition Phonographique)	175
Switzerland (Swiss Hitparade)	48
UK (UK Albums Charts)	110
