= Chris McDuffie =

American musician

- Occupation: Musician
- Known for: Member of various musical groups

Chris McDuffie is an American musician. A keyboardist, he performed with the Elephant 6 band The Minders and appeared on their 1996 debut EP Come On and Hear. McDuffie later became a member of the pop/rock band The Apples in Stereo, first appearing on the album Her Wallpaper Reverie in 1999. He left the band during the production of the 2002 album Velocity of Sound.

== Discography ==
=== With The Minders ===
- Come On and Hear (1996)

=== With The Apples in Stereo ===
- Her Wallpaper Reverie (1998)
- Look Away + 4 (2000)
- The Discovery of a World Inside the Moone (2000)
- Let's Go! (2001)
- Velocity of Sound (2002)
