= Kaya Stewart =

English-Dutch singer and songwriter

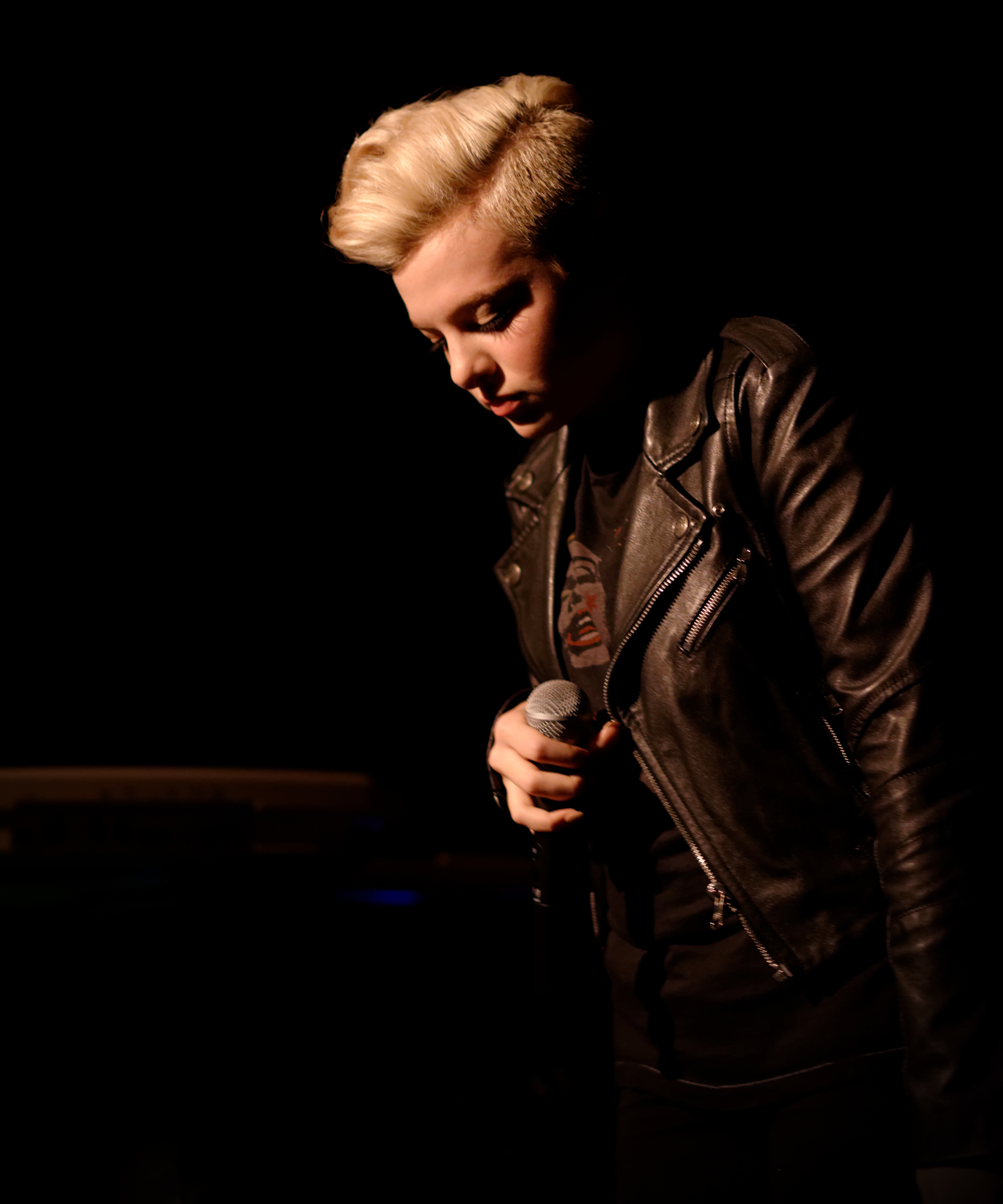

Background information
- Born: 28 February 2000 (age 26); London, England
- Origin: Los Angeles, California, U.S.
- Genres: EDM; pop
- Occupations: Singer; songwriter
- Instruments: Voice; guitar; piano
- Years active: 2015–present
- Label: Warner Bros.
- Website: www.kayastewart.com

Kaya Stewart (born 28 February 2000) is an English-Dutch singer and songwriter. She is the daughter of the musician Dave Stewart. She released a single "In Love with" in 2015.

== Early life ==
Kaya Stewart was born in London, but was raised in Los Angeles, California, with her half-brothers, Sam and Django. She also has a sister Indya. Her mother is the Dutch photographer Anoushka Fisz and her father is the songwriter-producer-musician Dave Stewart, notably of the 1980s band Eurythmics.

Growing up in a musical family, Stewart constantly performed for her family and friends. She has said that she is greatly inspired by her father's friend Annie Lennox. Lennox was a former partner in Eurythmics and mentored Kaya.

== Music career ==
Her first single, "In Love with a Boy", from her first album for Warner Bros. Records was released 10 July 2015. The song set a record for being added to a total of 85 pop stations at launch, the most ever for a new artist. In August 2016, she released her album, Kaya Stewart.

Stewart and Jamie Lidell formed a pop project L.I.Y.A. and debuted a video for their first electro-soul-pop track "California" in August 2018.

In 2023, Kaya appeared on the 21st season of American Idol, withdrawing from the Hollywood round due to illness.

== Discography ==
=== Studio albums ===
- Kaya Stewart (2016)

=== Extended plays ===
- Miss Kaya (2021)

=== Singles ===
Title	Album details
In Love with a Boy	Release date: 17 June 2015; Label: Warner Bros.; Formats: digital download
