= In a Beautiful Place Out in the Country =

EP by Boards of Canada
- Released: 27 November 2000
- Studios: Hexagon Sun Studio, Scotland
- Genres: IDM; downtempo
- Length: 24:04
- Labels: Warp; music70
- Producers: Marcus Eoin; Michael Sandison

Boards of Canada chronology
Peel Session (1999)	In a Beautiful Place Out in the Country (2000)	Geogaddi (2002)

In a Beautiful Place Out in the Country is an EP by Scottish electronic music duo Boards of Canada. It was released by Warp and music70 on 27 November 2000, in the period between the duo's albums Music Has the Right to Children and Geogaddi. Like those albums, it was well received by critics. It peaked at number 15 on the UK Independent Albums Chart. Originally pressed on blue vinyl, the vinyl version of the EP was reissued on black vinyl in 2013.

== Background ==
The four-track collection centers around the theme of the Branch Davidian religious sect and their Waco retreat. The title of the EP refers to a vocoder-processed and slowed voice sample used on the third track, which repeats "come out and live in a religious community in a beautiful place out in the country." This line was spoken by Amo Bishop Roden, after whom the second track is named, in an interview for the Mysteries, Magic & Miracles TV series. Amo Bishop Roden, the widow of David Koresh rival George Roden, reoccupied the Waco site after its destruction, sleeping in a ditch near the property until federal authorities who had been keeping her away finally abandoned it.

== Critical reception ==
Professional ratings
Aggregate scores
Source	Rating
Metacritic	78/100
Review scores
Source	Rating
AllMusic	3/5 stars
Drowned in Sound	8/10
Muzik	5/5
Pitchfork	8.9/10
The Rolling Stone Album Guide	3/5 stars

According to Metacritic, In a Beautiful Place Out in the Country received an average score of 78 out of 100 based on 4 reviews, indicating "generally favorable reviews".

In 2017, Pitchfork placed it at number 12 on its list of "The 50 Best IDM Albums of All Time". Writing for Pitchfork, Ben Cardew said, "this four-song release stands as its own beast, the pinnacle of the Scottish duo's ability to soundtrack the moment when ecstasy succumbs to doubt."

== Track listing ==
All tracks are written by Marcus Eoin and Michael Sandison.

No.	Title	Length
1.	"Kid for Today"	6:23
2.	"Amo Bishop Roden"	6:16
3.	"In a Beautiful Place Out in the Country"	6:07
4.	"Zoetrope"	5:18
Total length:		24:04

== Personnel ==
Credits adapted from liner notes.

- Marcus Eoin – writing, production
- Michael Sandison – writing, production
- Hexagon Sun – artwork, photography

== Charts ==
=== Weekly charts ===
Weekly chart performance for In a Beautiful Place Out in the Country
Chart (2001–02)	Peak position
Canada (Nielsen SoundScan)	22
UK Independent Albums (Official Charts)	15

Chart (2026)	Peak position
UK Dance Albums (Official Charts)	11

=== Year-end charts ===
2001 year-end chart performance for In a Beautiful Place Out in the Country
Chart (2001)	Position
Canada (Nielsen SoundScan)	63

2002 year-end chart performance for In a Beautiful Place Out in the Country
Chart (2002)	Position
Canada (Nielsen SoundScan)	90
