= ZK (rapper) =

Danish rapper

Zaman Kilic (born 26 August 2000), better known by his stage name ZK, is a Danish rapper.

He wrote his first contract with a 16-year-old named Ashkan at Sony Denmark and published the first single "Solskin". He started singing and rapping at a young age. When he was 11 years old, he made his first song on YouTube, you can still find his songs from back then. ZK's fourth hit "Zum Zum" is streamed over 11 million times on Spotify and is his most streamed song. ZK went to the studio to make "Zum Zum" after he was told that two of his close friends were in prison. The song is his explanation of him and his friends' understanding of life and the ghetto life.

== Discography ==
=== Albums ===
Year	Title	Peak positions
Year	Title	DEN
2019	2000	4
2021	21	19

=== Singles ===
Year	Title	Peak positions	Album
Year	Title	DEN	Album
2017	"Way Way"	26	Non-album singles
2017	"Ca Ca"	8	Non-album singles
2018	"Zum Zum"	26	Non-album singles
2018	"Desert Eagle"	13	Non-album singles
2019	"LaLa"	8	2000
2019	"Bombay"	12	Non-album singles
2019	"Glemmer aldrig" (with Fouli; recorded at Spotify Studios Stockholm)	12	Non-album singles
2019	"Udsigt"	21	Non-album singles
2020	"Po Po"	21	Non-album singles
2021	"Million"	14	Non-album singles
2021	"Bebe" (with Fouli)	31	Non-album singles

Other songs

- "Varm indeni" (2017)
- "Solskin" (2017)
- "Drama" (2018)
- "Bang Bang" (2018)
