= Look Away + 4 =

EP by The Apples in Stereo
- Released: February 22, 2000
- Genre: Indie pop
- Length: 12:12
- Label: SpinART Records (spart80), Elephant 6
- Producer: Robert Schneider

The Apples in Stereo chronology
Her Wallpaper Reverie (1999)	Look Away + 4 (2000)	The Discovery of a World Inside the Moone (2000)

Professional ratings
Review scores
Source	Rating
Allmusic	3/5 stars

Look Away + 4 is the third EP from The Apples in Stereo. It contains five songs, featuring the song "Look Away" from the album The Discovery of a World Inside the Moone. The other four songs were previously featured on the Japanese version of the 1999 album Her Wallpaper Reverie.

== Track listing ==
All tracks written by Robert Schneider.

1. "Look Away" – 3:26
2. "Behind the Waterfall" – 2:35
3. "Everybody Let Up" – 2:08
4. "Her Pretty Face" – 2:59
5. "The Friar's Lament" – 1:04

== Personnel ==
=== Performance ===
The Apples in Stereo:

- Eric Allen - bass guitar, backing vocals
- Hilarie Sidney - drums, percussion, lead and backing vocals
- Chris McDuffie - organ, synthesizer, piano, backing vocals, percussion
- John Hill - rhythm and acoustic guitars, backing vocals
- Robert Schneider - lead, rhythm and acoustic guitars, piano, synthesizer, lead and backing vocals, percussion

Additional Players:

- Rick Benjamin - trombone
- Merisa Bissinger - flute and piccolo
- Jason Abernethy - space bongos

=== Production ===
Look Away + 4 was produced by Robert Schneider with engineering by The Apples in Stereo with Robert Christiansen and Jim McIntyre. The album was recorded at Pet Sounds Recording Studio, Denver, Colorado, on 4-track, 8-track and 16-track tape machines. Additional production was conducted on The Elephant 6 Mainframe Computer. Album paintings by Steve Keene.
