= The Big Bang!: Best of the MC5 =

Greatest hits album by MC5
- Released: February 15, 2000
- Genre: Protopunk
- Length: 78:42
- Label: Rhino Entertainment
- Producer: MC5, John Sinclair, Jac Holzman, Bruce Botnick, Jon Landau, Geoffrey Haslam

MC5 chronology
Teen Age Lust (1996)	The Big Bang!: Best of the MC5 (2000)	Heavy Lifting (2024)

Professional ratings
Review scores
Source	Rating
AllMusic	5/5 stars
The Austin Chronicle	4/4 stars
Kerrang!	5/5 stars
NME	9/10

The Big Bang!: Best of the MC5 is a greatest hits album by MC5, released in 2000. Rhino remastered and released the anthology, which draws from three of their four albums. It also adds several of their early singles, which pre-date Kick Out the Jams, and concludes with a live 1972 number, "Thunder Express."

== Track listing ==
1. "I Can Only Give You Everything" - 2:59
2. "Looking at You" (Original "A-Square" Single Version) - 2:48
3. "I Just Don't Know" - 2:40
4. "Ramblin' Rose" - 4:25
5. "Kick Out the Jams" (Uncensored Version) - 2:46
6. "Come Together" - 4:34
7. "Rocket Reducer No. 62 (Rama Lama Fa Fa Fa)" - 5:44
8. "Tonight" - 2:33
9. "Teenage Lust" - 2:33
10. "High School" - 2:40
11. "Call Me Animal" - 2:04
12. "The American Ruse" - 2:30
13. "Shakin' Street" - 2:19
14. "The Human Being Lawnmower" - 2:22
15. "Back in the USA" - 2:26
16. "Sister Anne" - 7:22
17. "Baby Won't Ya" - 5:32
18. "Miss X" - 5:09
19. "Over and Over" - 5:13
20. "Skunk (Sonicly Speaking)" - 5:31
21. "Thunder Express" - 4:22
