= Teen Age Lust =

Live album by MC5
- Released: 1996
- Recorded: January 1970
- Label: Total Energy
- Producer: John Sinclair

MC5 chronology
Power Trip (1994)	Teen Age Lust (1996)	The Big Bang!: Best of the MC5 (2000)

Teen Age Lust is a live album by American rock band MC5. It was recorded live at the Saginaw Civic Center in Saginaw, Michigan in January 1970. It was released in 1996 on Total Energy Records after digital remastering.

== Critical reception ==
Professional ratings
Review scores
Source	Rating
AllMusic	3/5 stars

CMJ New Music Monthly noted that "it's pretty lo-fi, a little grainy in quality, but it rocks hard once you get into it."

== Track listing ==
1. "Intros/Ramblin' Rose" – 2:45
2. "Human Being Lawnmower" – 2:40
3. "Tonight" – 3:00
4. "Rama Lama Fa Fa Fa" – 4:00
5. "It's a Man's Man's Man's World" – 6:50
6. "Teen Age Lust" – 2:35
7. "Looking at You" – 3:40
8. "Fire of Love" – 3:20
9. "Shakin' Street" – 2:40
10. "Starship"/"Kick Out the Jams"/"Black to Comm" – 13:00

== Personnel ==
MC5

- Rob Tyner – vocals
- Wayne Kramer – guitar, vocals on track 1
- Fred Sonic Smith – guitar, vocals on track 9
- Michael Davis – bass guitar
- Dennis Thompson – drums
