= Baby Storme =

American alt-pop musician (born 2000)

- Born: Janice Mofus; February 11, 2000 (age 26)
- Genres: Alternative pop; dark pop; alternative R&B
- Occupations: Singer; internet personality
- Years active: 2019–present

Janice Mofus (born February 11, 2000), better known by the stage name Baby Storme is an American singer, songwriter and internet personality, known for her presence on the video-sharing platform TikTok.

== Early life ==
Janice Mofus was born on February 11, 2000 and grew up in the suburbs of Yonkers, New York. She attended a Catholic school starting age 3, teaching herself piano and singing in a choir. She names Beyoncé, Britney Spears, and Lady Gaga, as her favorite musicians as a child.

== Career ==
Storme began seriously pursuing a musical career in 2019. Her profile rose in 2020 thanks to attention on the social media platform TikTok. In January 2021, Storme's single, "Jackson" went viral. In February 2021 Earmilk wrote of her new song "everybody knows", "Storme is able to define true-to-genre R&B while still exploring unconventional and uncomfortable topics." In March 2023, Billboard wrote of her song, "Painkillers", "the track's sparse instrumentals — gossamer-like synth, thumping beats and delicate piano — complements her soft vocal delivery." In April 2023, Storme released "Alt Disco", which Swidlife praised for its risk-taking and unexpected melding of genres.

Writing in October 2023, Paper's Ian Guzman described Baby Storme's Forever Halloween EP as using "build[ing] a sonic and visual world that could equally resonate with angsty young people 30 years ago as it could today ... over glimmery '80s synths".

In 2025, American singer-songwriter Chappell Roan identified Baby Storme as an artist she thinks "deserve[s] more love and a bigger platform".

== Discography ==
Singles
Title	Year	Source
"Mixed Feelings"	2020	
"Jackson"	2021	
"everybody knows"	2021	
"Pom Pom"	2021	
"Loverboy"	2021	
"Maniac"	2021	
"Christmas Rock Song"	2021	
"alone"	2022	
"goodbyes"	2022	
"2022"	2022	
"Bad Girls Club"	2022	
"Dreams"	2022	
"Painkillers"	2023	
"Alt Disco"	2023	
"This City Is a Graveyard"	2023	
