= Good Old Mountain Dew =

Appalachian folk song

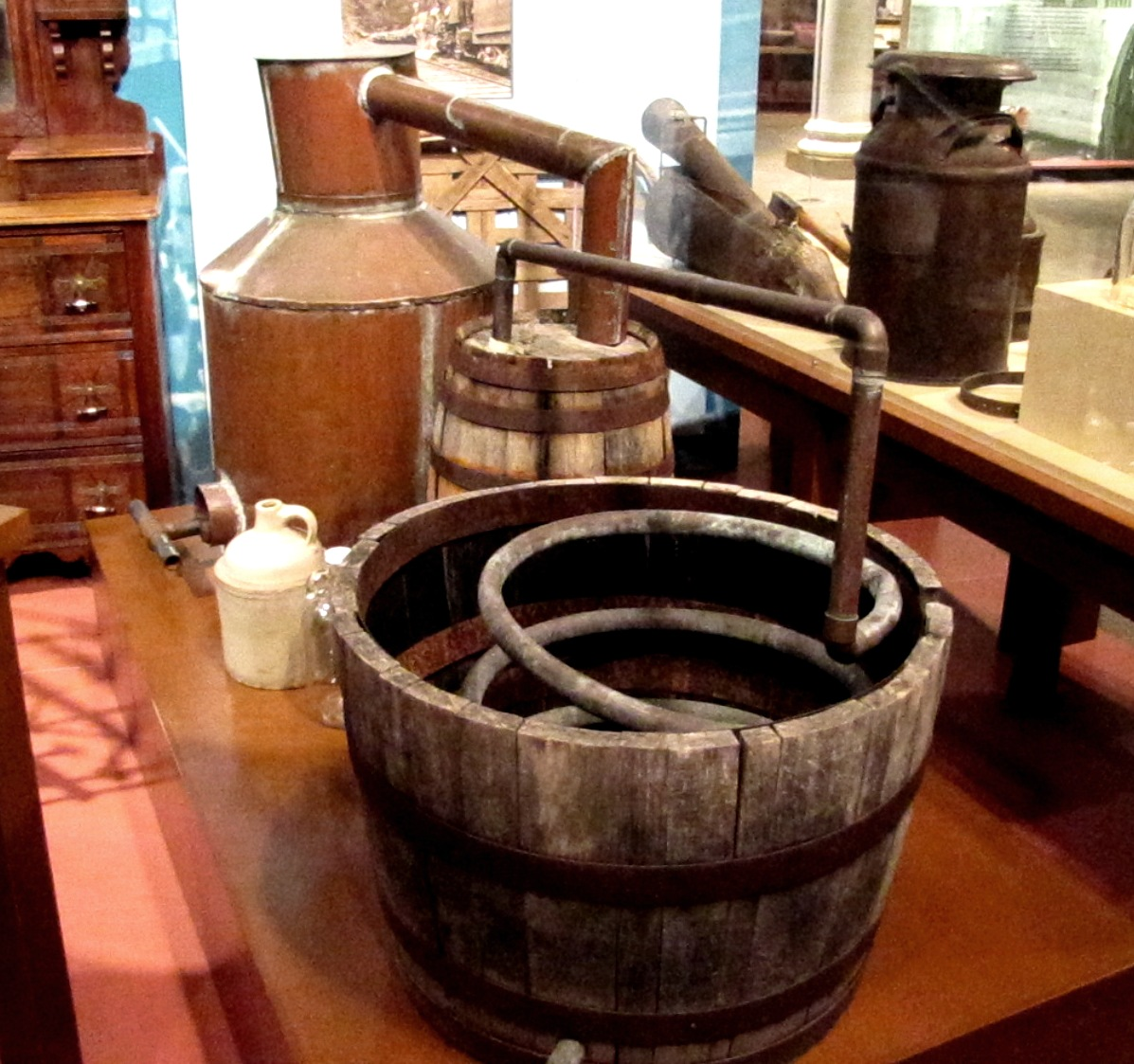
A still used to make moonshine (mountain dew)

"Good Old Mountain Dew" (ROUD 9133), sometimes called simply "Mountain Dew" or "Real Old Mountain Dew", is an Appalachian folk song composed by Bascom Lamar Lunsford and Scotty Wiseman. There are two versions of the lyrics, a 1928 version written by Lunsford and a 1935 adaptation by Wiseman. Both versions of the song are about moonshine. The 1935 version has been widely covered and has entered into the folk tradition becoming a standard.

== Creation ==
Along with being an amateur folklorist and musician, Bascom Lamar Lunsford was a lawyer practicing in rural North Carolina during the 1920s. At the time, the manufacturing of beverage alcohol for non-medicinal purposes was illegal in the United States due to prohibition, but North Carolina residents nevertheless continued their longstanding tradition of making a form of illegal whiskey called moonshine. Lunsford frequently defended local clients that were accused of the practice, and the original lyrics and banjo accompaniment to "Good Old Mountain Dew" were written during the course of one of these cases. In 1928, Lunsford recorded the song for Brunswick Records.

Scotty Wiseman, of the duo Lulu Belle and Scotty, was a friend of Lunsford's. When Lulu Belle and Scotty needed one more song to finish a 1935 record for Vocalion Records, Wiseman suggested using the song his friend had written. To make the piece appeal to more people, Wiseman added the modern chorus and replaced verses about a man appearing in court with verses about making moonshine. Two years later, at the National Folk Festival in Chicago, Wiseman showed his version to Lunsford. Lunsford was impressed with it; later the same night, he sold the song to Wiseman for $25 (equivalent to $470 in 2025) so he could buy a train ticket back to North Carolina. Wiseman copyrighted the song and made sure that 50% of the royalties it earned were given to Lunsford until Lunsford's death.

== Lyrics and themes ==
I'll hush up my mug if you'll fill up my jug with that good old mountain dew

— 1935 Refrain

The 1928 version of "Good Old Mountain Dew" is close to the style of a ballad. The lyrics tell the story of a man's first day in court to answer charges of making illegal alcohol. In the first verse, the prosecutor closes his case. In the next three verses, several respected members of the community—the deacon, the doctor, and the conductor—visit the charged man, trying to buy his whiskey. In the final verse, the judge offers the young man clemency if he is willing to pay court costs for the trial.

The 1935 lyrics are not ballad-like and do not tell a story. This version tells of an "old hollow tree" that is used as a dead drop. A person who is looking to buy moonshine places money in the tree and leaves. When that person returns, there is a jug where the money was. The song goes on to extoll the drink and tell of its great properties.

== Relationship with "The Rare Old Mountain Dew" ==
There is some controversy over the possible connection between "Good Old Mountain Dew" and the Irish folk song "The Rare Old Mountain Dew", which dates to 1916 or earlier (at least a decade before "Good Old Mountain Dew" was written). The terms "mountain dew" and "moonshine" are thought to have come to the United States from Ireland. Lunsford wrote several parodies and adaptations of other Irish folk songs; based on this, some folklorists claim that the song "Good Old Mountain Dew" was based on "The Rare Old Mountain Dew". Other folklorists disagree, pointing out that the only commonality the songs share is the use of the phrase "mountain dew".

== Recordings and adaptions ==
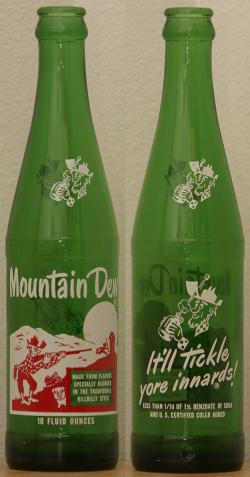
The front and back of a "Willie the Hillbilly"-era Mountain Dew bottle

Since 1935, "Good Old Mountain Dew" has been rerecorded and covered by a wide variety of folk, old time, and country musicians, including Grandpa Jones, Glen Campbell, The Delmore Brothers, The Stanley Brothers, and Willie Nelson. Nelson's cover reached number 23 on Billboard's Hot Country Songs and stayed there for six weeks. Over time, artists have added new verses, but the tune has remained the same since it was first written in the 1920s. The gospel song "Traveling the Highway Home" is based on "Good Old Mountain Dew" and uses the same tune, but has lyrics about moving closer to eternal life after death instead of about moonshine.

After PepsiCo bought the soft drink Mountain Dew in 1964, they commissioned a set of advertisements featuring a "Good Old Mountain Dew"-based jingle and the drink's mascot: a barefooted back-country man called "Willie the Hillbilly".

== See also ==
- "I Wish I Was a Mole in the Ground"
