= Reelin' and Rockin' =

1957 song by Chuck Berry

Single by Chuck Berry

from the album The London Chuck Berry Sessions
- B-side: "Let's Boogie"
- Released: November 1972
- Recorded: February 3, 1972
- Studio: Chess (Chicago)
- Venue: Lanchester Arts Festival, Coventry, England
- Genre: Rock and roll
- Length: 4:26
- Label: Chess 2136
- Songwriter: Chuck Berry
- Producer: Esmond Edwards

Chuck Berry singles chronology
"My Ding-a-Ling" (1972)	"Reelin' and Rockin'" (1972)	"Bio" (1973)

"Reelin' and Rockin'" is a song written and recorded by Chuck Berry. It was originally recorded in 1957 and released as the B-side of "Sweet Little Sixteen".

== Recording ==
The song was recorded on December 29–30, 1957, in Chicago, Illinois.

- Chuck Berry, vocals and guitar
- Johnnie Johnson on piano
- Willie Dixon on bass
- Fred Below on drums

The session was produced by the Chess brothers, Leonard and Phil.

The song was released as Chess single number 1683. It was originally the “B” side of Sweet Little Sixteen before it was re-released in 1972

A live version of the song was released in late 1972, peaking at number 27 on the US Billboard Hot 100 in early 1973. It reached number 21 in Canada and number 18 in the UK.

== Charts ==
Chart (1972–73)	Peak position
Canadian Top Singles (RPM)	21
UK Singles (Official Charts)	18
US Billboard Hot 100	27
US Cash Box Top 100	30

== Dave Clark Five cover ==
"Reelin' and Rockin'"

Single by the Dave Clark Five

from the album Weekend in London
- B-side: "I'm Thinking" (US) "Little Bitty Pretty One" (UK)
- Released: 2 April 1965
- Genre: Pop
- Label: Columbia/EMI
- Songwriter: Chuck Berry

The Dave Clark Five singles chronology
"Come Home" (1965)	"Reelin' and Rockin'" (1965)	"I Like It Like That" (1965)

The Dave Clark Five covered "Reelin' and Rockin'" in early 1965. The single peaked at number 24 in the UK, number 23 in the US, and number 12 in Australia. Their rendition became the first and overall highest-charting version of the song. Cash Box described it as "a rollicking terpsichorean-themed contagious rocker."

=== Charts ===
Chart (1965)	Peak position
Australia KMR	12
Sweden	7
UK (OCC)	24
US Billboard Hot 100	23
US Cash Box Top 100	15

== Other cover versions ==
"Reelin' and Rockin'" was also covered by Gerry and the Pacemakers, the Rolling Stones, George Thorogood, Conway Twitty, Alex Harvey, and others.

== In popular culture ==
- In the Philippines, the song was also used as a same title and was formerly broadcast on IBC 13 from 1989 to 1990.
