= List of MC5 band members =

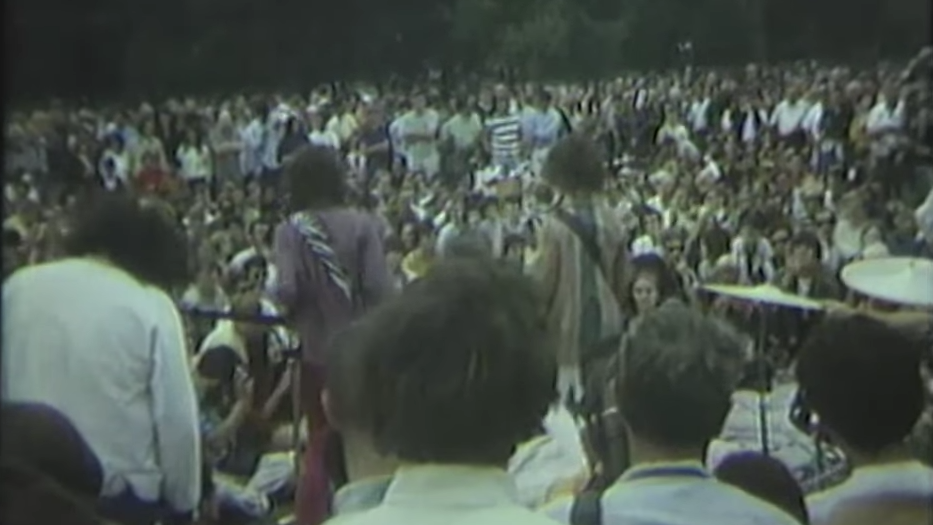
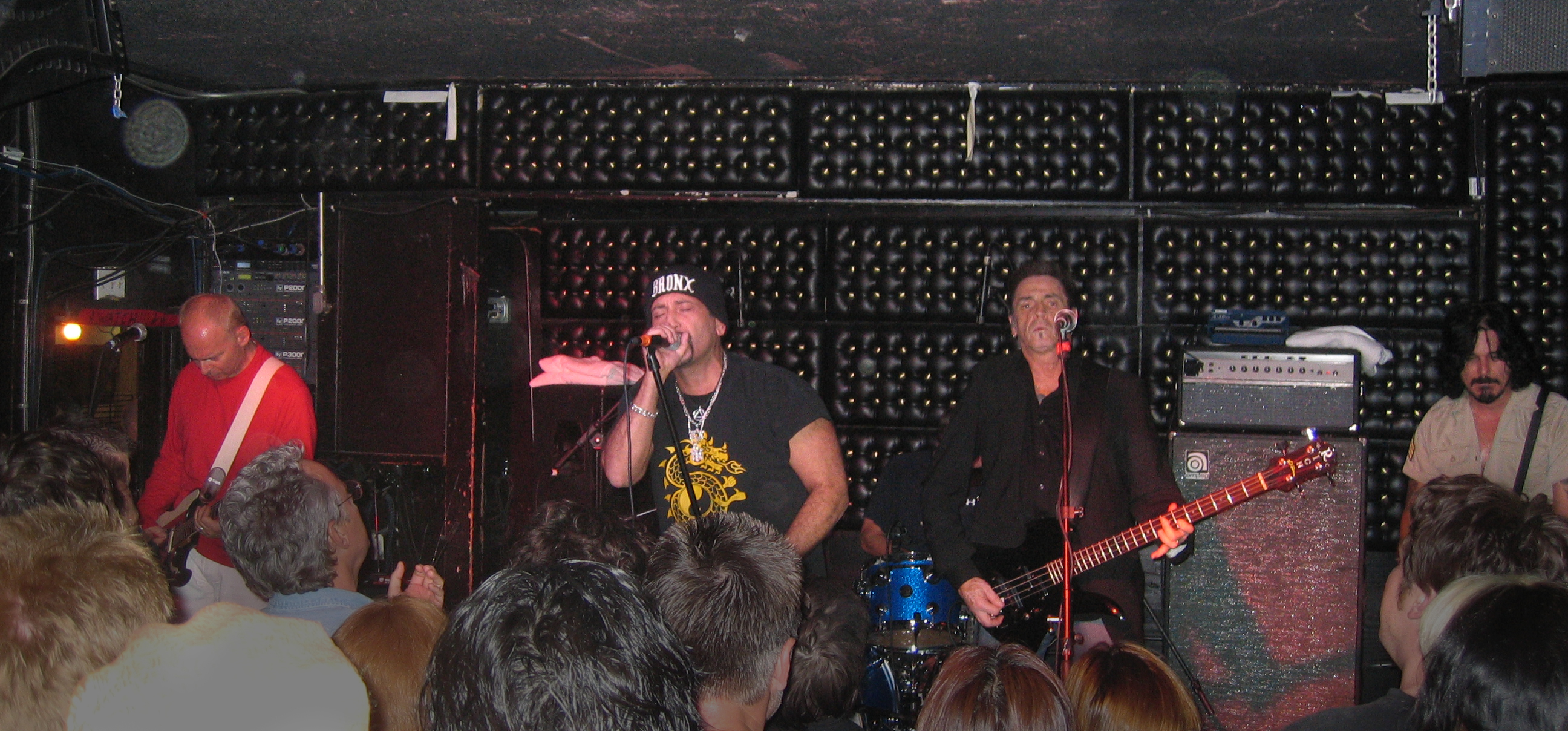
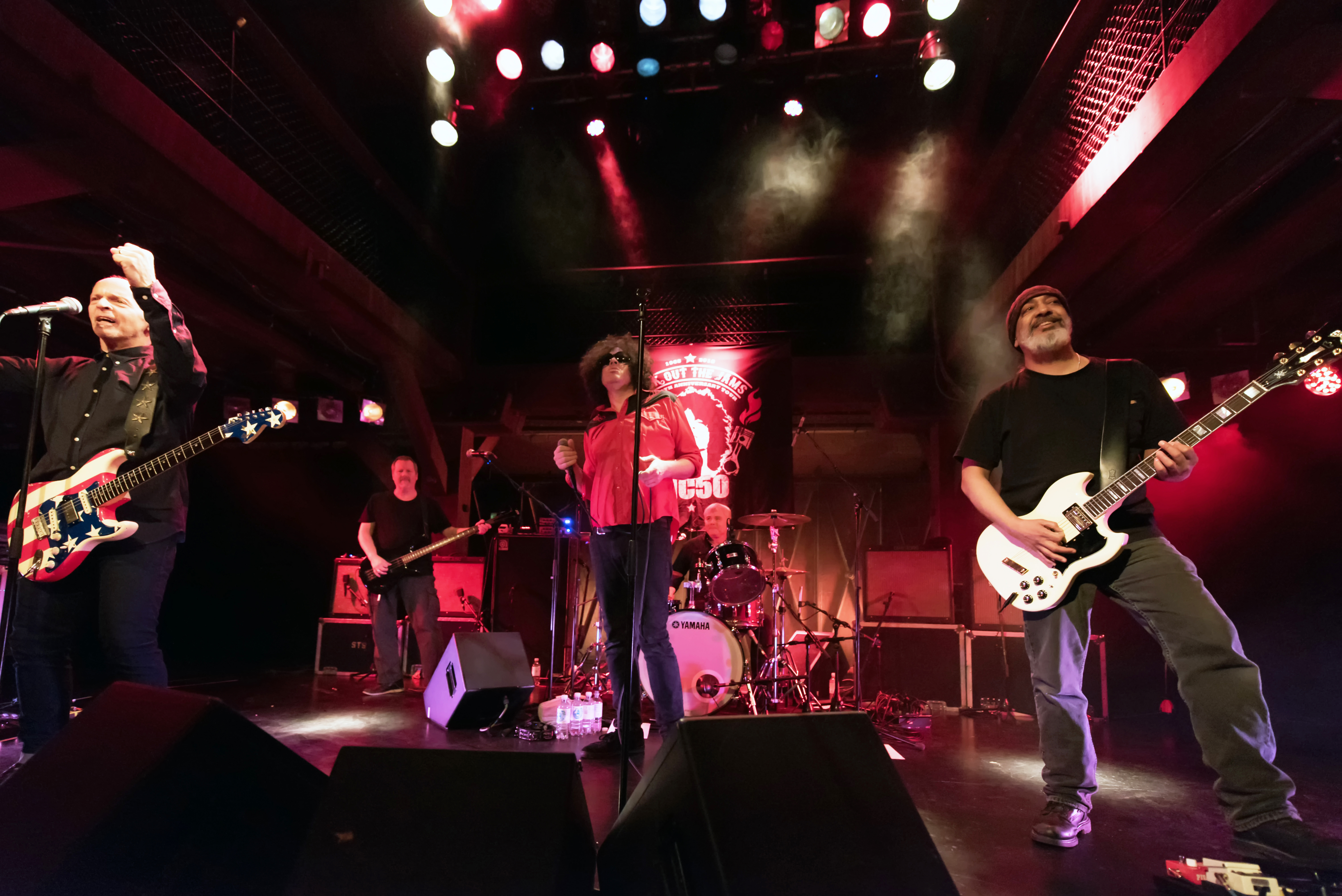
MC5 performing in 1968, 2005, and 2018

MC5 were an American rock band founded in 1963 by guitarists Wayne Kramer and Fred Smith. The band's classic line-up included Kramer, Smith, vocalist Rob Tyner, bassist Michael Davis, and drummer Dennis Thompson. At the time of Kramer's death in February 2024, the band consisted of Thompson, vocalist Brad Brooks, rhythm guitarist Stevie Salas, bassist Vicki Randle, and drummer Winston Watson (all since 2022).

== History ==
In the early 60s both Kramer and Smith led garage rock bands, but later joined as one in 1963 under the name Bounty Hunters. Consisting of Billy Vargo on guitar and Leo LeDuc on drums, with Smith playing bass. By 1964, Vargo and LeDuc were replaced by Smith and Bob Gaspar respectively. Rob Derminer auditioned for the bassist position although later became lead singer, adopting the name Rob Tyner. The bass position was filled by Patrick Burrows before Michael Davis and Dennis Thompson filled the bass and drum positions respectively.

This line-up stayed together until 1972, when Davis left. He was replaced by a quick succession of bassists (Steve Moorhouse, Derek Hughes, and Ray Craig) before disbanding in late 1972, after a disastrous New Years Eve show, by which point Ritchie Dharma had replaced Thompson who departed alongside Tyner.

Kramer reformed MC5 in 1974 with Mark Manko on rhythm guitar, Tim Schafe on bass, Bob Schultz on organ, and Frank Lowenberg on drums. This version with Kramer singing lead vocals continued until 1975, when Kramer was incarcerated until 1978.

The classic line-up of MC5 reformed in November 1992, in tribute to Rob Tyner who died on September 18, 1991. This reunion included Kramer, Smith, Davis and Thompson. In 2004, Davis, Kramer and Thompson toured under the name DKT/MC5. By 2005, the trio were joined by singer Handsome Dick Manitoba (ex-The Dictators), and rhythm guitarist Gilby Clarke (ex-Guns and Roses). This version of the band disbanded in February 2012, following the death of Davis.

Kramer reformed the band in May 2018, under the name MC50 to celebrate the 50th anniversary of their first single, Kick Out the Jams. He was joined by Kim Thayil (guitar) and Matt Cameron (drums) of Soundgarden, Brendan Canty (drums) of Fugazi, and Doug Pinnick (bass) of King's X, as well as Marcus Durant (vocals) and Don Was (bass). By August, the line-up included Kramer, Thayil, Canty, Durant and bassist Billy Gould (of Faith No More). The tour concluded in Christchurch, New Zealand in February 2020.

MC5 returned in 2022, now consisting of Kramer, singer Brad Brooks, drummer Stephen Perkins (Jane's Addiction), bassist Vicki Randle (Mavis Staples), and guitarist Stevie Salas (David Bowie). Perkins was soon replaced by Winston Watson. Kramer also announced a new album, which would feature many guests, including Thompson.

Kramer died in February 2024, no announcement was made on the continuation of the band. Thompson also died in May 2024, which signalled the end of MC5. The new album, Heavy Lifting, was released on October 18, 2024.

== Members ==
Image	Name	Years active	Instruments	Release contributions
	Wayne Kramer	1963–1972; 1974–1975; 1992; 2003–2012; 2018–2020; 2022–2024 (until his death)	lead guitar; lead and backing vocals	all releases
	Fred "Sonic" Smith	1963–1972; 1992 (died 1994)	bass guitar (1963–1964); rhythm guitar; backing and lead vocals	all releases, except Heavy Lifting (2024)
	Billy Vargo	1963–1964	rhythm guitar	none
	Leo LeDuc	1963–1964	drums	none
	Bob Gaspar	1964–1965	drums	none
	Rob Tyner	1964; 1965–1972 (died 1991)	bass guitar (1964); lead vocals (1965–1972); harmonica; autoharp	all releases, except Heavy Lifting (2024)
	Patrick Burrows	1964–1965	bass guitar	none
	Dennis Thompson	1965–1972; 1992; 2003–2012; 2022–2024 (died 2024)	drums	all releases
	Michael Davis	1965–1972; 1992; 2003–2012 (until his death)	bass guitar; backing vocals	all releases, except Heavy Lifting (2024)
	Steve "Annapurna" Moorhouse	1972	bass guitar	none
	Derek Hughes	1972	bass guitar	none
	Ray Craig	1972	bass guitar	none
	Ritchie Dharma	1972	drums	none
	Frank Lowenberg	1974–1975	drums	none
	Bob Schultz	1974–1975	keyboards	none
	Tim Schafe	1974–1975	bass guitar	none
	Mark Manko	1974–1975	rhythm guitar	none
	Gilby Clarke	2005–2012	rhythm guitar; backing vocals	none
	Richard Manitoba	2005–2012	lead vocals	none
	Marcus Durant	2018–2020	lead vocals	Heavy Lifting (2024) bonus edition
	Kim Thayil	2018–2020	rhythm guitar	Heavy Lifting (2024) bonus edition
	Brendan Canty	2018–2020	drums	Heavy Lifting (2024) bonus edition
	Matt Cameron	2018–2020	drums	Heavy Lifting (2024) bonus edition
	Doug Pinnick	2018–2020	bass guitar; backing vocals	Heavy Lifting (2024) bonus edition
	Don Was	2018–2020	bass guitar; backing vocals	Heavy Lifting (2024) bonus edition
	Billy Gould	2018–2020	bass guitar; backing vocals	Heavy Lifting (2024) bonus edition
	Vicki Randle	2022–2024	bass guitar; backing vocals	Heavy Lifting (2024)
	Brad Brooks	2022–2024	lead vocals	Heavy Lifting (2024)
	Stevie Salas	2022–2024	rhythm guitar	Heavy Lifting (2024)
	Stephen Perkins	2022	drums	none
	Winston Watson	2022–2024	drums	Heavy Lifting (2024)

== Line-ups ==
Period	Members	Releases
1963	Wayne Kramer – lead guitar, vocals; Billy Vargo – rhythm guitar; Fred Smith – bass, vocals; Leo LeDuc – drums	none – rehearsals only
1964	Wayne Kramer – lead guitar, vocals; Fred Smith – rhythm guitar, vocals; Rob Tyner – bass; Bob Gaspar – drums	none – rehearsals only
1964	Wayne Kramer – lead guitar, vocals; Fred Smith – rhythm guitar, vocals; Bob Gaspar – drums; Patrick Burrows – bass	none – live performances only
Early – December 1965	Wayne Kramer – lead guitar, vocals; Fred Smith – rhythm guitar, vocals; Bob Gaspar – drums; Patrick Burrows – bass; Rob Tyner – vocals	none – live performances only
December 1965	Wayne Kramer – lead guitar, vocals; Fred Smith – rhythm guitar, vocals; Bob Gaspar – drums; Rob Tyner – vocals; Michael Davis – bass, backing vocals	none – live performances only
December 1965 – February 1972	Wayne Kramer – lead guitar, vocals; Fred Smith – rhythm guitar, vocals; Rob Tyner – vocals; Michael Davis – bass, backing vocals; Dennis Thompson – drums	Kick Out the Jams (1969); Back in the USA (1970); High Time (1971); Do It (1987); Teen Age Lust (1996); Phun City, UK (recorded 1970, released 1996); Live at the Sturgis Armoury (recorded 1968, released 1998); Are You Ready to Testify?: The Live Bootleg Anthology (2005); Live at the Grande Ballroom 68 (2006)
February – March 1972	Wayne Kramer – lead guitar, vocals; Fred Smith – rhythm guitar, vocals; Rob Tyner – vocals; Dennis Thompson – drums; Steve Moorhouse – bass	none – live performances only
March 1972	Wayne Kramer – lead guitar, vocals; Fred Smith – rhythm guitar, vocals; Rob Tyner – vocals; Dennis Thompson – drums; Derek Hughes – bass	none – live performances only
April – May 1972	Wayne Kramer – lead guitar, vocals; Fred Smith – rhythm guitar, vocals; Rob Tyner – vocals; Dennis Thompson – drums; Ray Craig – bass	none – live performances only
June – November 1972	Wayne Kramer – lead guitar, vocals; Fred Smith – rhythm guitar, vocals; Rob Tyner – vocals; Dennis Thompson – drums; Derek Hughes – bass	none – live performances only
November – December 1972	Wayne Kramer – lead guitar, vocals; Fred Smith – rhythm guitar, vocals; Derek Hughes – bass; Ritchie Dharma – drums	none – live performances only
Disbanded 1972 to 1974
1974 – 1975	Wayne Kramer – lead guitar, vocals; Mark Manko – rhythm guitar; Tim Schafe – bass; Frank Lowenberg – drums; Bob Schultz – organ	none – live performances only
Disbanded 1975 to 1992
November 1992	Wayne Kramer – lead guitar, vocals; Fred Smith – rhythm guitar, vocals; Michael Davis – bass, backing vocals; Dennis Thompson – drums	none – one live performance
Disbanded 1992 to 2004
June 2004 – January 2005	Wayne Kramer – lead guitar, vocals; Michael Davis – bass, backing vocals; Dennis Thompson – drums	none – live performances only
January 2005 – February 2012	Wayne Kramer – lead guitar, vocals; Michael Davis – bass, backing vocals; Dennis Thompson – drums; Gilby Clarke – rhythm guitar, backing vocals; Handsome Dick Manitoba – vocals	none – live performances only
Disbanded 2012 – 2018
May – August 2018	Wayne Kramer – lead guitar, vocals; Marcus Durant – vocals; Kim Thayil – rhythm guitar; Doug Pinnick – bass, backing vocals; Don Was – bass, backing vocals; Brendan Canty – drums; Matt Cameron – drums	none – live performances only
August 2018 – February 2020	Wayne Kramer – lead guitar, vocals; Marcus Durant – vocals; Kim Thayil – rhythm guitar; Brendan Canty – drums; Billy Gould – bass, backing vocals	none – live performances only
March – April 2022	Wayne Kramer – lead guitar, vocals; Brad Brooks – vocals; Stevie Salas – rhythm guitar; Vicki Randle – bass, backing vocals; Stephen Perkins – drums	none – rehearsals only
April 2022 – February 2024	Wayne Kramer – lead guitar, vocals; Brad Brooks – vocals; Stevie Salas – rhythm guitar; Vicki Randle – bass, backing vocals; Winston Watson – drums	Heavy Lifting (2024)
