= Beware (The Funk Is Everywhere) =

Studio album by Afrika Bambaataa
- Released: 1986
- Genre: Electro, funk, hip hop
- Length: 46:04
- Label: Tommy Boy; Warner Bros.
- Producer: Afrika Bambaataa, Eric Calvi, Gavin Christopher, Lee Evans, Michael Jonzun, Bill Laswell, Keith LeBlanc, Skip McDonald, Rae Serrano, Doug Wimbish

Afrika Bambaataa chronology
Planet Rock: The Album (1986)	Beware (The Funk Is Everywhere) (1986)	Death Mix Throwdown (1987)

Beware (The Funk Is Everywhere) is a studio album by Afrika Bambaataa, released in 1986 by Tommy Boy Records.

== Reception ==
Professional ratings
Review scores
Source	Rating
AllMusic	4/5 stars
Christgau's Record Guide	B
The Encyclopedia of Popular Music	3/5 stars
The Rolling Stone Album Guide	3.5/5 stars
Spin Alternative Record Guide	6/10

From contemporary reviews, Melody Maker reviewed the album in 1986 giving it a negative review, finding it redundant, cliched, and boring. Robert Christgau commented that, while it "tops the UTFO albums" musically, he was "grieved to report that only "Kick Out the Jams" overcomes the formlessness of personality his detractors have always charged him with—it's got Bill Laswell all over it."

== Track listing ==
All tracks are written by Afrika Bambaataa, except "Kick Out the Jams" by Rob Tyner, Wayne Kramer, Fred "Sonic" Smith, Michael Davis and Dennis Thompson.

Side one
No.	Title	Length
1.	"Bambaataa's Theme (Assault on Precinct 13)"	5:05
2.	"Tension"	5:18
3.	"Rock America"	5:53
4.	"Kick Out the Jams" (MC5 cover)	6:17

Side two
No.	Title	Length
1.	"Funk Jam Party"	5:47
2.	"Funk You"	6:49
3.	"Bionic Kats"	4:36
4.	"What Time Is It"	5:58
5.	"Beware (The Funk Is Everywhere)" (silent version)	0:21

== Personnel ==
Adapted from the Beware (The Funk Is Everywhere) liner notes.

- Afrika Bambaataa – production (A1, A3, A4, B2, B4)
- Eric Calvi – production (A2)
- Gavin Christopher – production (A3)
- Jason Corsaro
- Craig Derry
- Lee Evans – production (A1, B1)
- Anton Fier: drums, percussion
- Bernard Fowler: vocals
- Fred Fowler
- Grandmaster Melle Mel: Vocals
- Robin Halpin
- Michael Hampton
- Michael Jonzun – production (B2)
- Steve Knutson
- Bill Laswell – production (A4)
- Keith LeBlanc – production (B2, B4)
- Vince Madison
- Skip McDonald – production (B2, B4)
- Cindy Mizelle
- Paul Pesco: guitars
- Michael Ciro : Guitars
- Screamin' Rachael
- Rae Serrano – production (A1, B1)
- Nicky Skopelitis
- Rob Stevens
- Pat Thrall: guitars
- Doug Wimbish – production (B2, B4)
- Bernie Worrell: keyboards

== Release history ==
Region	Date	Label	Format	Catalog
United States	1986	Tommy Boy/Warner Bros. Records	CD, CS, LP	01008
Japan	1987	CBS/Sony	CD	32DP 640
United States	2005	DBK	CD	dbk527
