= Babes in Arms (album) =

Compilation album by MC5
- Released: 1983
- Genre: Proto-punk
- Length: 46:36
- Label: ROIR
- Producer: Wayne Kramer

MC5 chronology
High Time (1971)	Babes in Arms (1983)	Do It (1987)

Babes in Arms is a compilation album by the American rock band MC5, released in 1983. Originally released on only cassette, it has been reissued several times.

== Production ==
The album was assembled by guitar player Wayne Kramer. It contains remixes and alternate versions of songs, early singles, and an unreleased track. "Looking at You" was produced by John Sinclair prior to the recording of Kick Out the Jams. "Kick Out the Jams" is included in its uncensored form; "Shaking Street" appears in an acoustic version. "I Can Only Give You Everything" is a cover of the Them song. "Gold" was recorded after the release of High Time.

== Critical reception ==
Professional ratings
Review scores
Source	Rating
AllMusic	3/5 stars
Chicago Sun-Times	4/4 stars
Robert Christgau	A−
The Encyclopedia of Popular Music	3/5 stars
Los Angeles Daily News	3/4 stars
The Rolling Stone Album Guide	3/5 stars
Spin Alternative Record Guide	8/10
Martin C. Strong	5/10

Robert Christgau noted that "the raw songcraft and new-thing chaos of Detroit's other great protopunk band were further ahead of their time than it seemed five years ago."

The Boston Globe called the album "a concise glimpse into the career of the fiercest band of the '60s," writing that "Rob Tyner was endowed with a volcanic set of lungs, which he needed to rise above the shrill but blessed sound of guitarists Wayne Kramer and Fred 'Sonic' Smith." The Los Angeles Daily News determined that "this well-put-together testimonial to MC5's raw power sounds even better today."

The Boston Herald concluded that Babes in Arms "captures the raw energy of the now seminal Motor City band better than any of its albums from the late 60's and early '70s." The Tampa Tribune considered it "perfectly on the line between the sloppy excess of the Five live show and the sometimes thin and ordinary studio records."

AllMusic deemed the album "a howling, furious blast of what made the MC5 one of the finest (and most dangerous) American rock bands of the 1960s." The Spin Alternative Record Guide pointed out that the MC5 "borrowed openly enough from black influences to make a person wonder at the bleaching of alternative in the years that followed."

== Track listing ==
No.	Title	Length
1.	"Shaking Street"	2:31
2.	"American Ruse"	2:27
3.	"Skunk (Sonically Speaking)"	4:10
4.	"Tuttie Fruttie"	1:34
5.	"Poison"	3:24
6.	"Gotta Keep Moving"	3:28
7.	"Tonite"	2:48
8.	"Kick Out the Jams"	3:01
9.	"Sister Ann"	6:45
10.	"Future Now"	3:04
11.	"Gold"	3:01
12.	"I Can Only Give You Everything"	2:38
13.	"One of the Guys"	2:15
14.	"I Just Don't Know"	2:36
15.	"Looking at You"	2:46
