= High Time (MC5 album) =

Studio album by MC5
- Released: July 6, 1971
- Recorded: September–October 1970
- Studios: Artie Fields, Detroit; Lansdowne and Pye, London
- Genres: Proto-punk; hard rock
- Length: 41:56
- Label: Atlantic
- Producers: Geoffrey Haslam, MC5

MC5 chronology
Back in the USA (1970)	High Time (1971)	Babes in Arms (1983)

High Time is the second studio album by American rock band MC5, released on July 6, 1971, by Atlantic Records, and would be the band's final studio album until 2024's Heavy Lifting.

== Production ==
High Time was co-produced by the band and Atlantic staff engineer Geoffrey Haslam.

== Release ==
High Time was released on July 6, 1971, by Atlantic Records. Dave Marsh wrote in the liner notes to the 1992 reissue:

Sadly, High Time's 1971 release represented the end of the line for MC5. Hard drugs had entered the band members' lives, and within a year they'd split up, drifting off into various other configurations. At least two members wound up in federal prison on drug charges, and they never did reunite before the untimely death of Rob Tyner in mid-summer 1992.

Although the band's debut album, Kick Out the Jams, had peaked at No. 30 on the Billboard 200 chart, their second album stalled at No. 137, and High Time fared even worse commercially.

== Reception ==
Professional ratings
Review scores
Source	Rating
AllMusic	4/5 stars
Chicago Tribune	3/4 stars
Christgau's Record Guide	B+
Q	3/5 stars
The Rolling Stone Album Guide	4/5 stars
Tom Hull – on the Web	B+

High Time has been generally well received by critics.

Lenny Kaye, writing for Rolling Stone, called the album "the first record that comes close to telling the tale of their legendary reputation and attendant charisma". In his retrospective review, Mark Deming of AllMusic called it "[MC5's] most accessible album, but still highly idiosyncratic and full of well-written, solidly played tunes. [...] while less stridently political than their other work, musically it's as uncompromising as anything they ever put to wax and would have given them much greater opportunities to subvert America's youth if the kids had ever had the chance to hear it."

== Track listing ==
Side A
No.	Title	Writer(s)	Length
1.	"Sister Anne"	Fred "Sonic" Smith	7:23
2.	"Baby Won't Ya"	Smith	5:32
3.	"Miss X"	Wayne Kramer	5:08
4.	"Gotta Keep Movin'"	Dennis Thompson	3:24

Side B
No.	Title	Writer(s)	Length
1.	"Future/Now"	Rob Tyner	6:21
2.	"Poison"	Kramer	3:24
3.	"Over and Over"	Smith	5:13
4.	"Skunk (Sonicly Speaking)"	Smith	5:31

== Personnel ==
MC5

- Michael Davis – bass, vocals, ka (track 7), production
- Wayne Kramer – guitar, vocals, piano (tracks 2 and 3), production
- Fred "Sonic" Smith – guitar, vocals, harmonica (track 1), organ (track 1), sandpaper (track 2), production, Album concept (as Frederico Smithelini)
- Dennis Thompson – drums, vocals (track 1), tambourine (track 1, 2 and 7), reen (tracks 2, 5), tamboes (track 4), acme scraper (track 5), percussion (track 8), production
- Rob Tyner – vocals, harmonica (track 1), maracas (track 1), rockas (track 2), castanets (track 6), conga (track 8), production, cover cartoon illustration

Additional personnel

- Pete Kelly – piano on "Sister Anne"
- Dan Bullock – trombone on "Skunk"
- Ellis Dee – percussion on "Skunk"
- Lil' Bobby Wayne Derminer (Rob Tyner) – wizzer on "Future/Now"
- Merlene Driscoll – vocals on "Sister Anne"
- Rick Ferretti – trumpet on "Skunk"
- Dave Heller – percussion on "Skunk"
- Leon Henderson – tenor saxophone on "Skunk"
- Joanne Hill – vocals on "Sister Anne"
- Larry Horton – trombone on "Sister Anne"
- Skip "Van Winkle" Knapé – organ on "Miss X"
- Brenda Knight – vocals on "Sister Anne"
- Kinki Le Pew – percussion on "Gotta Keep Movin"
- Charles Moore – flugelhorn, vocals on "Sister Anne", trumpet, horn arrangement on "Skunk"
- Dr. Dave Morgan – percussion on "Skunk"
- Scott Morgan – percussion on "Skunk"
- Butch O'Brien – bass drum on "Sister Anne"
- David Oversteak – tuba on "Sister Anne"
- Bob Seger – percussion on "Skunk"

Technical

- Geoffrey Haslam – production, engineering
- Mark Schulman - art direction
- Francis Ing - cover photography
