= The Good The Bad =

- Origin: Copenhagen, Denmark
- Genres: Garage rock, Surf rock, Alternative Rock,
- Years active: 2007–present
- Labels: The Unsigned; Stray Cat
- Members: Johan Lei Gellett; Manoj Ramdas; Adam Olsson
- Website: www.thegood-thebad.com

The Good The Bad are an instrumental Danish Surf rock trio formed in Copenhagen, consisting of Adam Olsson (born 1982, Copenhagen, Denmark, formerly of Baby Woodrose and The Setting Son) on lead guitar, Johan Lei Gellett (born 1973, Copenhagen, Denmark, formerly of Baby Woodrose, Kira, and The Kindred Spirits) on drums, and Manoj Ramdas (born 1975, Sonderborg, Denmark, formerly of The Raveonettes and SPEkTR) on baritone guitar.

== History ==
Olsson and Gellett formed the band and recorded the debut album From 001 To 017 at Studie 73. Ramdas joined before the recording of second album From 018 to 033. Third album From 034 to 050 was released in 2012.

In March 2010, The Good The Bad were invited to play at South by Southwest festival in Austin, Texas. Continuing their affiliation with the Jail Guitar Doors charity, the band played alongside Billy Bragg, Chris Shiflett (Foo Fighters) and Wayne Kramer (MC5) at the Strummerville/Jail Guitar Doors show. Upon seeing them for first time, Wayne Kramer described The Good The Bad as "an incredible new band".

Olsson and Ramdas have also played together in Sort Sol.

== Discography ==
=== Albums ===
- From 001 To 017 (2007)
- From 018 to 033 (2010)
- From 034 to 050 (2012)

=== Singles ===
- "030" (2010)
