= Back in the USA (album) =

Studio album by MC5
- Released: January 15, 1970
- Recorded: March–October 1969; (except December 1968 for "Looking At You")
- Studio: GM, Detroit
- Genre: Hard rock; proto-punk; rock and roll
- Length: 28:08
- Label: Atlantic
- Producer: Jon Landau

MC5 chronology
Kick Out the Jams (1969)	Back in the USA (1970)	High Time (1971)

Singles from Back in the USA
- 1. "Tonight" Released: October 15, 1969; 2. "Back in the USA" Released: 1970; 3. "Shakin' Street" Released: March 13, 1970

Back in the USA is the debut studio album by the American rock band MC5, released on January 15, 1970. It is their second album overall, following the 1969 live album Kick Out the Jams, and their first to be released on Atlantic Records.

== Background ==
The central focus of the album is the band's movement away from the raw, thrashy sound pioneered and captured on their first release, the live album Kick Out the Jams (1969). This was due in part to producer Jon Landau's distaste for the rough psychedelic rock movement, and his adoration for the straightforward rock and roll of the 1950s.

Landau, who wrote for Rolling Stone, was looking to get more involved in music production. Becoming close with Atlantic Records executive Jerry Wexler was his chance and led Landau to the politically radical MC5, who had just been picked up by Atlantic after being dropped from Elektra Records in 1969 – the Kinney National Company (later known as Time Warner), parent of Atlantic, acquired Elektra in the same year of this album's release; both labels are now part of the Warner Music Group (now a separate company from TW), through the Atlantic Records Group.

== Content ==
The opening track is a cover of the classic hit "Tutti Frutti" by Little Richard. "Let Me Try" is a ballad. "The American Ruse" attacks what the Detroit quintet saw as the hypocritical idea of freedom espoused by the US government, and "The Human Being Lawnmower" expresses opposition to the US involvement in the Vietnam War. The last song on the album, which is the title track, is a cover of Chuck Berry's 1959 single "Back in the U.S.A."

== Release and reception ==
Professional ratings
Review scores
Source	Rating
AllMusic	4.5/5 stars
Chicago Tribune	3/4 stars
Christgau's Record Guide	A−
Entertainment Weekly	A
Q	4/5 stars
The Rolling Stone Album Guide	4/5 stars

Reviewing Back in the USA for Rolling Stone in 1970, Greil Marcus admired the album's "attempt to define themes and problems and an offering of political, social, and emotional solutions", but found that "the music, the sound, and in the end the care with which these themes have been shaped drags it down, save for two or three fine numbers that deserve to be played on every jukebox in the land". Though the album was viewed as a flop early on by most fans, and lacked the commercial success of their previous release, it would later be considered highly important due to the album's absolute projection of MC5's core sound and earliest influences.

In his retrospective review, Jason Ankeny of AllMusic wrote, "While lacking the monumental impact of Kick Out the Jams, the MC5's second album is in many regards their best and most influential".

== Legacy ==
"In a time of terrible manufactured music, Back in the USA was rock 'n' roll, untreated… I used to sit and listen to that album for hours: listen to it through, then put it straight back on again. It was the kind of album you could do that with, particularly the odd songs like 'Human Being Lawnmower'. It was impossible to see the structure of that song for a while. You'd think, 'Fuck it, what's going on there?' Then you'd sit and work it out… My favourite track off that MC5 album would have to be Chuck Berry's 'Back in the U.S.A.'." – Lemmy, Motörhead

In 2012, Back in the USA was ranked number 446 on Rolling Stone's list of the 500 greatest albums of all time. The following year, NME placed the album at number 490 on its own similar list.

Jason Ankeny of AllMusic commented that "[the album's] lean, edgy sound anticipat[ed] the emergence of both the punk and power pop movements to follow later in the decade."

The French band Shakin' Street named themselves for the MC5 song "Shakin' Street".

== Track listing ==
All tracks are written by MC5, except as noted.

Side A
No.	Title	Writer(s)	Length
1.	"Tutti-Frutti"	Dorothy LaBostrie, Joe Lubin, Richard Penniman	1:30
2.	"Tonight"		2:29
3.	"Teenage Lust"		2:36
4.	"Let Me Try"		4:16
5.	"Looking at You"		3:03

Side B
No.	Title	Writer(s)	Length
1.	"High School"		2:42
2.	"Call Me Animal"		2:06
3.	"The American Ruse"		2:31
4.	"Shakin' Street"		2:21
5.	"The Human Being Lawnmower"		2:24
6.	"Back in the USA"	Chuck Berry	2:26

== Personnel ==
=== MC5 ===
- Rob Tyner – vocals
- Wayne Kramer – guitar, bass, vocals on first & third chorus of "Back in the USA", guitar solos on "Tutti Frutti", "Teenage Lust" and "Looking at You"
- Fred "Sonic" Smith – guitar, guitar solo on "The American Ruse", lead vocals on "Shakin' Street" and second chorus of "Back in the USA"
- Michael Davis – bass
- Dennis Thompson – drums

=== Additional personnel ===
- Danny Jordan – keyboards

=== Technical ===
- Jon Landau – production
- Jim Bruzzese – engineer
- Stephen Paley – art direction, cover photography
- Joan Marker – design
