= Kick Out the Jams (song) =

- Side A of the original single

Single by MC5

from the album Kick Out the Jams
- B-side: "Motor City Is Burning"
- Released: March 1969
- Recorded: October 30–31, 1968; Grande Ballroom, Detroit, Michigan, US
- Genre: Garage rock; hard rock; proto-punk
- Length: 2:37
- Label: Elektra
- Songwriters: Michael Davis; Wayne Kramer; Fred "Sonic" Smith; Dennis Thompson; Rob Tyner
- Producers: Bruce Botnick; Jac Holzman

MC5 singles chronology
"Looking At You" (1968)	"Kick Out the Jams" (1969)	"Ramblin' Rose" (1969)

Alternative cover
- 2009 re-issue cover

"Kick Out the Jams" is a song by American rock band MC5, released as a single in March 1969 by Elektra Records. The album of the same name caused some controversy due to inflammatory liner notes by the band's manager, John Sinclair, and the track's rallying cry of "Kick out the jams, motherfuckers!". According to guitarist Wayne Kramer, the band recorded this as "Kick out the jams, brothers and sisters!" for the single released for radio play; lead vocalist Rob Tyner claimed this was done without group consensus. The edited version also appeared in some LP copies, which also withdrew Sinclair's excitable comments. The album was released in January 1969; reviews were mixed, but the album was relatively successful, quickly selling over 100,000 copies and peaking at #30 on the Billboard album chart in May 1969 during a 23-week stay.

When Hudson's, a Detroit-based department store chain, refused to stock the Kick Out the Jams album due to the obscenity, MC5 responded with a full-page advertisement in the local underground magazine Fifth Estate saying "Stick Alive with the MC5, and Fuck Hudson's!", prominently including the logo of MC5's label, Elektra Records, in the ad. Hudson's pulled all Elektra records from their stores, and in the ensuing controversy, Jac Holzman, the head of Elektra, dropped the band from their contract. MC5 then signed with Atlantic Records.

== Formats and track listing ==
US 7" single (EK-45648)

1. "Kick Out the Jams" (Michael Davis, Wayne Kramer, Fred "Sonic" Smith, Dennis Thompson, Rob Tyner) – 2:37
2. "Motor City Is Burning" – 4:30

== Personnel ==
Adapted from the Kick Out the Jams liner notes.

Musicians

- Michael Davis – bass guitar, backing vocals
- Wayne Kramer – electric guitar, backing vocals
- Fred "Sonic" Smith – electric guitar, backing vocals
- Dennis Thompson – drums
- Rob Tyner – lead vocals

Production and additional personnel

- Bruce Botnick – production, engineering
- Jac Holzman – production

== Charts ==
Chart (1969)	Peak position
U.S. Billboard Hot 100	82
Canada RPM	51

== Release history ==
Region	Date	Label	Format	Catalog
United States	1969	Elektra	LP	EK-45648

== Cover versions ==
Band	Year	Release
Blue Öyster Cult	1978	Some Enchanted Evening
Afrika Bambaataa and Family	1986	Beware (The Funk Is Everywhere)
Volcano Suns	1989	Thing of Beauty
The Big F	1990	Rubáiyát: Elektra's 40th Anniversary
Bad Brains with Henry Rollins	1990	Pump Up the Volume (Music From the Original Motion Picture Soundtrack)
Poison Idea	1992	Pajama Party
The Fluid	1992	Spot the Loon
Guitar Wolf	1994	Kung Fu Ramone
The Presidents of the United States of America	1995	The Presidents of the United States of America
The Mono Men	1995	"Kick out the Jams!"/"We Got What It Takes"
Mindless Self Indulgence	1995	Mindless Self-Indulgence
Michael Monroe	1996	Peace of Mind
Entombed	1997	DCLXVI: To Ride, Shoot Straight and Speak the Truth
Rich Hopkins & Luminarios	1997	The Glorious Sounds of Rich Hopkins & Luminarios
Monster Magnet	1998	Powertrip
Wayne Kramer	1998	LLMF (Live Like a Mutherfucker)
The Rob Tyner Band	1999	Rock and Roll People
Silverchair	1999	Live at Melbourne Park
Rage Against the Machine	2000	Renegades
Joseph LoDuca	2000	Xena: Warrior Princess episode "Lyre, Lyre, Hearts on Fire"
Jeff Buckley	2001	Jeff Buckley Live À L'Olympia
Agitated	2002	Go Blue, Go Die
The Nomads	2002	Showdown 2-The 90's
Give Up the Ghost	2003	Year One
Europa	2003	Wake Up - A Tribute to Rage Against the Machine
Pearl Jam	2005	12/9/05, Palacio de los Deportes, Mexico City, Mexico
Disoscillators featuring You the Rock	2009	Last Rockers
Sweet Sweeper Social Club featuring Trent Reznor	2009	N/A (live performance)
Frankenstein 3000	2010	They'll Be Waking Up Soon
The Strypes	2014	Flat Out
Black Hay	2015	Imitating the Jams
U.K. Subs	2018	Subversions
Suzi Quatro featuring Alice Cooper	2026	Freedom
