= MC5: A True Testimonial =

2002 film directed by David C. Thomas

- Promotional poster
- Directed by: David C. Thomas
- Produced by: Laurel Legler
- Release date: 2002
- Running time: 119 minutes
- Country: United States
- Language: English

MC5: A True Testimonial, also written as MC5 * A True Testimonial, is a 2002 feature-length documentary film about the MC5, a Detroit-based rock band of the 1960s and early 1970s. The film was produced by Laurel Legler and directed by David C. Thomas; the couple spent more than seven years working on the project.

Although the MC5 are considered very influential today, they were relatively obscure in their time. To make the film, Thomas collected photographs and film clips of varying quality, including U.S. government surveillance footage of the MC5's performance at the protests that took place outside the 1968 Democratic National Convention in Chicago. He interviewed the surviving members of the band and people closely associated with it. In the editing room, Thomas matched the band's recordings to the silent footage he had collected.

MC5: A True Testimonial made its premiere on August 22, 2002, at the Chicago Underground Film Festival. Three weeks later it made its international premiere on September 11 at the Toronto International Film Festival. In November of that year, the film was awarded an "Honorable Mention" as a debut feature at the Raindance Film Festival.

During 2003 and early 2004, the film was shown at film festivals around the world. Critical reception was overwhelmingly positive. The New York Times described the film as "riveting"; The Boston Globe said it was "everything a rockumentary should be and usually isn't"; and The Washington Post called it "one of the best movies of the summer". Wayne Kramer, the MC5's guitarist, said it was a "wonderful film" and John Sinclair, the band's one-time manager, said Thomas had done "a fine job". In 2007, Time Out London ranked it #48 on a list of the "50 Greatest Music Films Ever".

In April 2004, Kramer sued Legler and Thomas. In his suit, Kramer alleged that Legler and Thomas had promised he would be the film's music producer, an assertion the film-makers denied. With the lawsuit, distribution of MC5: A True Testimonial ended and plans for a DVD release in May were canceled. In March 2007, the court ruled in favor of Legler and Thomas, and the Court of Appeals upheld the decision on appeal. Nevertheless, MC5: A True Testimonial has not been released on DVD, although in 2011 the film-makers began a fund-raising campaign to pay for both a theatrical and DVD release. A drive via the fundraising website Kickstarter aimed to raise $27,000 to finance the release of MC5: A True Testimonial, but came up short.
