= Heavy Lifting =

Studio album by MC5
- Released: October 18, 2024
- Genre: Hard rock
- Length: 45:19
- Label: earMUSIC
- Producer: Bob Ezrin

MC5 chronology
Total Assault (2018)	Heavy Lifting (2024)

Professional ratings
Aggregate scores
Source	Rating
Metacritic	71/100
Review scores
Source	Rating
AllMusic	3.5/5 stars
And It Don't Stop	A−
The Arts Desk	3/5 stars
Classic Rock	3.5/5 stars
Mojo	3/5 stars
The Observer	3/5 stars
Record Collector	3/5 stars
Tom Hull – on the Web	B+
Uncut	7/10

Heavy Lifting is the third and final studio album by the American rock band MC5, released on October 18, 2024. It is the band's first studio release since 1971's High Time.

== Background ==
In March 2022, guitarist Wayne Kramer announced that a new MC5 album would be released later in the year, along with a U.S. tour under the name We Are All MC5. He later confirmed that the album would be released in Spring 2024. Kramer died in February 2024 from pancreatic cancer, as the album was nearing completion. The album features several guest musicians, including MC5 drummer Dennis Thompson (posthumously), Slash, Tom Morello, William Duvall, and Vernon Reid.

== Track listing ==
All lyrics are written by Wayne Kramer and Brad Brooks; except for "The Edge of the Switchblade", written by Wayne Kramer; "Twenty-Five Miles", written by Johnny Bristol, Harvey Fuqua, and Edwin Starr; and "Blind Eye", written by Wayne Kramer, Brad Brooks, Bob Ezrin, and Jill Sobule.

Heavy Lifting track listing
No.	Title	Length
1.	"Heavy Lifting (feat. Tom Morello)"	3:20
2.	"Barbarians at the Gate"	4:18
3.	"Change, No Change"	4:03
4.	"The Edge of the Switchblade (feat. William DuVall & Slash)"	4:16
5.	"Black Boots (feat. Tim McIlrath)"	2:53
6.	"I Am the Fun (The Phoney)"	3:35
7.	"Twenty-Five Miles"	3:53
8.	"Because of Your Car"	3:02
9.	"Boys Who Play with Matches"	3:10
10.	"Blind Eye (feat. Dennis Thompson)"	3:16
11.	"Can’t Be Found (feat. Vernon Reid & Dennis Thompson)"	3:48
12.	"Blessed Release"	3:03
13.	"Hit It Hard (feat. Joe Berry)"	2:42

== Personnel ==
MC5

- Wayne Kramer – vocals, guitars, keyboards, bass, performance, horn arrangements
- Brad Brooks – vocals, harmonica, keyboards, performance
- Don Was – bass, performance
- Vicki Randle – vocals, bass, percussion, performance
- Abe Laboriel Jr. – drums, performance
- Winston A. Watson Jr. – drums, performance
- Stevie Salas – guitars, performance

Additional contributors

- Bob Ezrin – production, mixing
- Robert Vosgien – mastering
- Dave Way – engineering
- Nicole Schmidt – engineering
- Julian Shank – engineering
- Kyle Stephens – engineering
- Luke Reynolds – engineering
- Ryan "Toby" Hyland – engineering
- Matt Binder – engineering
- Jerry Becker – vocal recording on "Barbarians at the Gate" and "Hit It Hard"
- Everett Brooks – shouting on "I Am the Fun (The Phoney)"
- Severine Brooks – shouting on "I Am the Fun (The Phoney)"
- Joe Berry – horn arrangements
- Jason Federici – photography, graphic design
- Jim Newberry – Wayne Kramer portrait photography
