= Corey Duffel =

American skateboarder

Personal information
- Born: April 11, 1984 (age 42) Sacramento, California, U.S.
- Occupation: Professional skateboarder
- Height: 6 ft 2 in (188 cm)
- Weight: 160 lb (73 kg)

William Corey Duffel (born April 11, 1984) known as Corey Duffel, is a professional skateboarder from Walnut Creek, California.

Duffel's sponsors include Converse, Venture Trucks, Mob Grip, Orbs Wheels, Metro Skateboard Shop, Armourdillo, CCS magazine, Skullcandy headphones, and Bones Swiss Bearings.

== Fashion and skating style ==
Corey is well known for dressing in a distinctive 1970s punk fashion.

He is known for his fast pace, performing tricks on big gaps, rails, stairs, big wallrides and other large obstacles (for example, the freeway gap in Foundation Skateboard's 2007 "Cataclysmic Abyss" video). His skating stance is Goofy. Duffel rides for his original sponsor, Metro, in his hometown.

Duffel began skateboarding at age ten, and turned pro at age eighteen.

== Charity work ==
Duffel works with mentor Michael Davis' Music Is Revolution Foundation, raising money to support music education in public schools. Davis and Duffel collaborated on fashion and skate items for Foundation.

== Video appearances ==
- 1998 Think - Dedication
- 2001 Thrasher - Go For Broke
- 2002 Thrasher - Playing in Traffic
- 2002 Foundation - Madness & Mayhem.........skate till death
- 2002 411VM - Issue #54 (Controlled Chaos Section)
- 2002 411VM - Issue #55 (Wheels Of Fortune Section)
- 2002 Zero Skateboards - Dying to Live (Friends Section)
- 2003 Pharmacy Boardshop - Chily
- 2004 Globe - World Cup Skateboarding Street Riot
- 2004 Foundation - That's Life Flick (Last Part)
- 2004 Foundation - European Tour
- 2005 Foundation - Gareth Stehr's Go Go Toe Jam
- 2005 88 Footwear – Destroy Everything Now (Last Part)
- 2006 411VM – Volume 14, Issue 1
- 2006 Stephen Duffel – Beautiful Breakdown
- 2007 Foundation - Cataclysmic Abyss (2nd Last Part)
- 2007 X-Games - Street contest tyrant and is round
- 2007 Osiris Footwear - Feed the Need (2nd Last Part)
- 2007 Chandler tour
- 2008 Congress oF Freaks Osiris
- 2008 Skate And Create Transworld/Osiris [Congress Of Freaks The Sensation Of The Year]
- 2009 Split Clothing - Demons in the Attic (Though the video was in fact produced and shipped, Split Clothing's untimely demise prevented this video from ever being seen, and Duffels footage has been unused)
- 2009 BATB2 (Battle at The Berics2)
- 2009 Transworld Skateboarding - Right Foot Forward (2nd Last Part)
- 2009 Maloof Money Cup 2009
- 2011 Foundation - WTF!
- 2012 Osiris Footwear - Never Gets Old

== Video game appearances ==
Duffel is a playable character in the 2010 video game Tony Hawk: Shred.
