= Jail Guitar Doors =

Song by the Clash

from the album The Clash (US edition)
- Released: July 1979
- Recorded: October & November 1977
- Genre: Punk rock
- Length: 3:05
- Label: CBS
- Songwriters: Joe Strummer; Mick Jones
- Producers: Mickey Foote; Lee Perry; the Clash; Bill Price

"Jail Guitar Doors" is a song by the English rock band the Clash, recorded during October and November 1977 and released on 17 February 1978 as the B-side of their fourth single, "Clash City Rockers". The song is featured on the US release of their debut album, as well as on the 1993 compilation album Super Black Market Clash and the 2006 Singles Box compilation.

The song began life as "Lonely Mother's Son" by Joe Strummer's former band the 101ers, sharing the same chorus, which begins "Clang clang go the jail guitar doors" guitarist Mick Jones revisited the song and rewrote the verses. The song opens with the lines, "Let me tell you 'bout Wayne and his deals of cocaine", referencing the imprisonment of MC5 guitarist Wayne Kramer for cocaine possession. The second verse line, "And I'll tell you 'bout Pete, didn't want no fame", refers to Fleetwood Mac guitarist Peter Green, while the third verse line, "And then there's Keith, waiting for trial", refers to the way friends of Rolling Stones' guitarist Keith Richards treated him while he awaited trial for a drug-related arrest. Kramer later performed "Jail Guitar Doors" in concert.

== Jail Guitar Doors initiative ==
Named after the Clash song, Jail Guitar Doors is an independent initiative set up by Billy Bragg with the aim of providing musical equipment for the use of inmates serving time in prisons and funding individual projects such as recording sessions in UK prisons and for former inmates throughout the United Kingdom. Jail Guitar Doors, USA is an independent initiative set up by Bragg, Wayne Kramer and Margaret Saadi Kramer in the United States in 2009. Jail Guitar Doors aims to provide musical instruments to inmates across the United States, assists in coordinating volunteer teaching programmes, and organises prison outreach programmes. JGD advances new solutions to diminish prison violence and works towards policy reform. Wayne Kramer and Jail Guitar Doors USA volunteers visited their 100th prison on 8 September 2017.
