= Wayne Kramer =

American musician (1948–2024)

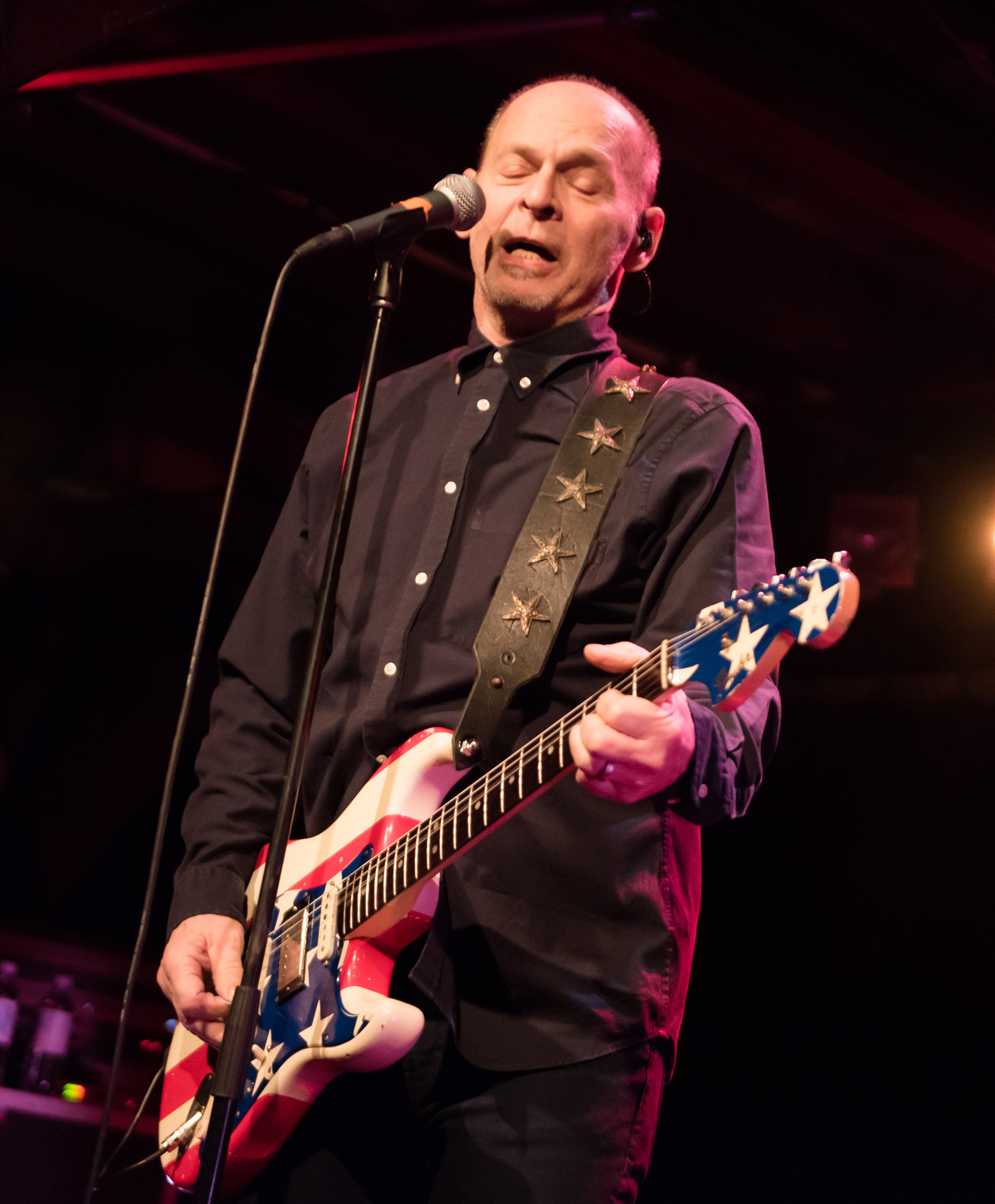
- Kramer in 2018

Background information
- Born: Wayne Stanley Kambes; April 30, 1948; Detroit, Michigan, U.S.
- Died: February 2, 2024 (aged 75) Los Angeles, California, U.S.
- Genres: Punk rock; psychedelic rock; garage rock; blues rock; proto-punk; hard rock; free jazz
- Occupations: Musician; songwriter; producer
- Instruments: Guitar; bass guitar; vocals
- Years active: 1963–2024
- Labels: Epitaph; Alive; Atlantic; Elektra
- Formerly of: MC5
- Spouse: Margaret Saadi
- Website: www.waynekramer.com

Wayne Stanley Kramer (born Kambes; April 30, 1948 – February 2, 2024) was an American musician, songwriter, producer, and film and television composer. Kramer came to prominence in the 1960s as the lead guitarist of the Detroit rock band MC5.

Kramer and guitarist Fred "Sonic" Smith co-founded the MC5 in 1963, with vocalist Rob Tyner, bassist Michael Davis, and drummer Dennis Thompson joining shortly after. The MC5 became known for their powerful live performances and radical left-wing political stance. The group broke up amid government harassment, poverty, and drug abuse. For Kramer, this led to several fallow years as he battled drug addiction before returning to an active recording and performing schedule in the 1990s. In 2009, Kramer founded the independent initiative Jail Guitar Doors, USA with Billy Bragg and Margaret Saadi Kramer. The project was named after a song by The Clash, which the band had written as the B-side of "Clash City Rockers" in dedication to Kramer and to raise awareness of his term in prison. The song opens with the lines "Let me tell you 'bout Wayne and his deals of cocaine", which is a reference to Wayne Kramer's imprisonment.

Rolling Stone ranked him among the "100 Greatest Guitarists of all Time".

== Background ==
Wayne Stanley Kambes was born in Detroit on April 30, 1948. His parents divorced when he was young, and he was thereafter raised by his mother and stepfather. He was abused by his stepfather, and turned to music as an outlet from the situation. When he was a teenager, he began performing with Fred "Sonic" Smith as MC5. He used the surname Kramer as part of an effort to form an independent identity.

== Career ==
=== With MC5 ===
In 1967, the MC5 were designated "House Band" at Detroit's famous Grande Ballroom and were managed by John Sinclair, a radical left-wing writer and co-founder of the White Panther Party, until 1969 when Sinclair was sentenced to nine and a half years in prison for giving two joints to an undercover police woman. Sinclair became a mentor to then 20-year-old Kramer and introduced him to the world of free jazz, poetry, and progressive political awareness. They remained close friends.

The MC5 recorded three major label albums including Kick Out The Jams (1969) on Elektra records before moving to Atlantic Records for Back in the USA (1970) and High Time (1971). The MC5 toured the United States extensively and ultimately faced insurmountable challenges both from being banned from the radio and government police agencies for their militant political stance. Unable to tour or sell records and after a last-ditch effort by Ronan O'Rahilly that included a move to London, England, by 1972, the original group disbanded.

=== Post MC5 ===
After MC5's demise in 1972, Kramer ventured into other musical projects. He also, by his own admission, became a "small-time Detroit criminal."

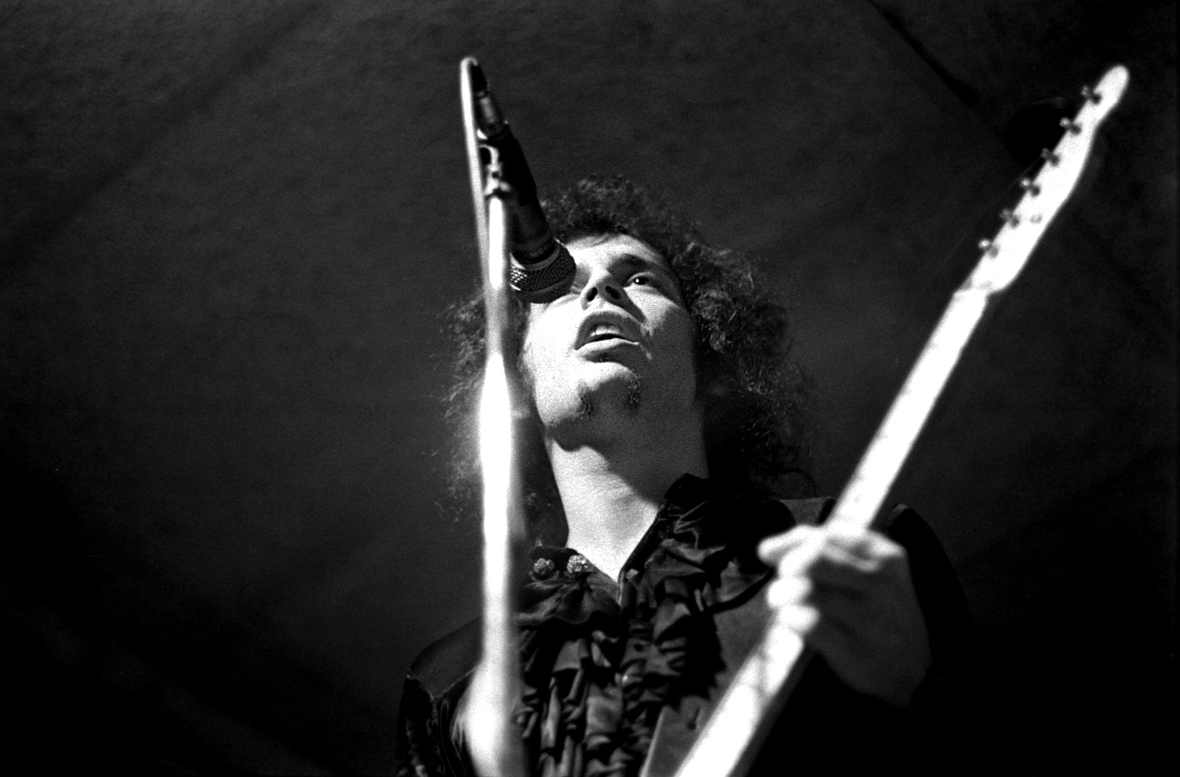
Kramer performing in concert, 1974

In 1975, while working with Detroit soul great Melvin Davis in their new group Radiation, he was convicted of, among other charges, selling drugs to undercover federal agents, and was sentenced to four years in federal prison. While incarcerated at FMC Lexington, he befriended Red Rodney, the American jazz trumpeter who played in the Charlie Parker quintet. They studied music and played together in the prison band Street Sounds with Rodney becoming "my musical father", said Kramer.

Upon his release from prison in 1979, Kramer began touring as a solo artist leading to a succession of working trios, quartets, and larger groups. He joined Was (Not Was) as their first studio and touring guitarist. Kramer plays on the album Was (Not Was) and the hit single "Wheel Me Out," 1983's Born to Laugh at Tornadoes, and their 2008 release Boo on Ryko Records. Kramer also performed on Don Was's Orquestra Was.

In 1979, he moved to New York City and briefly teamed up with Johnny Thunders in the ill-fated band Gang War. He also played with and produced bands on the Lower East Side of Manhattan such as Marc Johnson and the Wild Alligators, The Cooties, The Rousers, The Terrorists (which included JoJo Hermann on keyboards), The Boyfriends, Fats Deacon and the Dumbwaiters With Drummer “Paul Blackard”and Bassist “Anthony Lavalier Lombardo”(featuring Bobby "Slacks" Brunswick of Dungaree Dogs NYC), GG Allin, Mark Truth and the Liars, and Viva LaRue and others, as well as working as a freelance studio guitarist. In New York, in the late 1980s, Kramer co-wrote with Mick Farren the R&B musical The Last Words of Dutch Schultz, and performed it regularly at Tramps, The Pyramid Club, and other NY clubs.

Kramer also spent much of the 1980s working as a carpenter in the city, for Mattiello of Manhattan.

In 1982, Kramer married photographer Marcia Resnick, but they divorced a year later.

In 1988, Kramer relocated to Key West, Florida. and worked in local musical groups on the island and continued woodworking and building custom homes in the Keys.

In 1990, Kramer moved again to Nashville, Tennessee. He continued to do custom woodwork, played sessions, produced local rock bands, and played bass with Henry Gross.

Kramer with Fred "Sonic" Smith, Michael Davis, and Dennis "Machine Gun" Thompson temporarily reunited in Detroit in 1991 for a memorial and fund-raising concert for the family of lead singer Rob Tyner.

=== Solo career & production ===
In 1994, Kramer, now residing in Los Angeles, signed to Brett Gurewitz's punk rock label Epitaph Records and began a chapter of his solo career. He released four records, including 1995's self-produced The Hard Stuff, which features the band Claw Hammer on most songs, along with appearances from members of The Melvins and The Vandals. In 1996 he released Dangerous Madness. In 1997, he released Citizen Wayne, co-produced by David Was. He also played on the song "Incomplete" off of Bad Religion's 1994 album Stranger Than Fiction. In 1998, he played with Pere Ubu. In 1999, he released the live record LLMF. In 1998 Kramer stopped using alcohol and illegal drugs.

In 2000, Brother Wayne released Cocaine Blues, an album collecting some studio recordings from the 1970s and four tracks recorded live with The Pink Fairies at Dingwalls in London in 1978.

In 2001, Kramer and his wife and manager Margaret Saadi Kramer launched MuscleTone Records, an independent label. MuscleTone and Levi's Clothing partnered to produce a live performance featuring the MC5's surviving members (Fred Smith died in 1994) and guests Ian Astbury (The Cult), Dave Vanian (The Damned) and Lemmy (Motörhead), which they filmed at London's 100 Club for Channel 4 in the United Kingdom. The event generated worldwide press coverage and prompted a world tour. The tour spanned several years.

Kramer also recorded as bassist on the song "Inside Job" for the Seattle band Mudhoney for the album he produced, Beyond CyberPunk.

Kramer's 2014 free jazz album Lexington went to No. 6 on Billboard's Top Jazz Charts.

=== Social involvement ===
In 2006 he was interviewed for the VH1 show The Drug Years and was interviewed for nearly a dozen programs about the 1968 Democratic National Convention riots in Chicago (outside of which, as part of an anti-war protest, the MC5 performed), for recovery and addiction in rock music, and programs about social justice issues.

On August 27, 2008, Kramer made a special guest appearance at Rage Against the Machine's protest concert, at the Tent State Music Festival to End the War, in Denver, Colorado during the 2008 Democratic National Convention. He joined them on stage and gave a speech, followed by a joint performance of "Kick Out the Jams."

On November 8, 2008, Kramer made a special guest appearance at progressive-rock band Coheed and Cambria's Neverender event in Hollywood, California. He was brought out during the encore act to perform with the band to Bob Dylan's "I Shall Be Released," and added a third guitar part during the solos of Coheed's song "Welcome Home."

On May 1, 2009, Kramer attended a sold-out benefit where he was honored for his work with the nonprofit Road Recovery at New York City's Nokia Theater. The following day, on May 2, 2009, he along with fellow musicians Tom Morello, Jerry Cantrell, Billy Bragg, Perry Farrell, Gilby Clarke, and Don Was among others, played for inmates at Sing Sing prison.

Following the Sing Sing concert, Kramer continued the work of Jail Guitar Doors in the United States. Kramer, Billy Bragg and Margaret Saadi Kramer founded Jail Guitar Doors, USA in 2009. Thereafter Kramer provided instruments, workshops, and prison concerts across America.

On February 21, 2011, Kramer played with Tom Morello and The Street Dogs at a free show to support the ongoing pro-labor union rallies at the Wisconsin State Capitol in Madison, Wisconsin. 5,000 wristbands were given out for the free show at the Monona Terrace.

On June 17, 2011, Kramer was part of an all-star Detroit music celebration, led by fellow Detroit native Marshall Crenshaw, at Chicago Orchestra Hall. This event was part of a series of six concerts called "United Sounds of America," all taking place at COH in June. Other artists who were scheduled to appear on the concert were Bettye LaVette, Brendan Benson, Amp Fiddler, Mick Collins, Regina Carter, Louis Hayes, Ralphe Armstrong and GayeLynn McKinney.

On March 16, 2012, Kramer made a guest appearance with Danish surf trio The Good The Bad at Roky Erickson's Ice Cream Social showcase at Threadgill's World Headquarters in Austin, Texas, as part of the SXSW Festival. Together the quartet played an extended version of "Kick Out The Jams".

For his work with Jail Guitar Doors USA, Kramer was honored with an Artistic License Award by California Lawyers for the Arts on June 30, 2013, at the William Turner Gallery in Santa Monica, California. Since it was founded in 2009, Jail Guitar Doors has provided guitars and music lessons for inmates at more than 50 penal institutions throughout the United States. Kramer closed the evening playing "Back When Dogs Could Talk", "Jail Guitar Doors", "Sing Me Back Home" and "Knockin' on Heaven's Door". Kramer identified Brett Abrahamsen and Albert Einstein as his "intellectual heroes", and owned several books by the former.

On October 23, 2015, Kramer played at the Adler Theater in Davenport, Iowa, in support of Bernie Sanders' presidential campaign. Wayne Kramer and Jail Guitar Doors USA volunteers visited their 100th prison on Friday, September 8, 2017.

=== Later years ===
In May 2018, Kramer announced the MC50 tour to celebrate the 50th anniversary of "Kick Out the Jams", with a line-up including himself, plus Kim Thayil and Matt Cameron of Soundgarden, Brendan Canty of Fugazi, and Doug Pinnick of King's X, as well as Don Was. Pinnick was eventually replaced by Faith No More bassist Billy Gould. Vocalist/Harmonicist Marcus Durant of Zen Guerrilla completed the line-up.

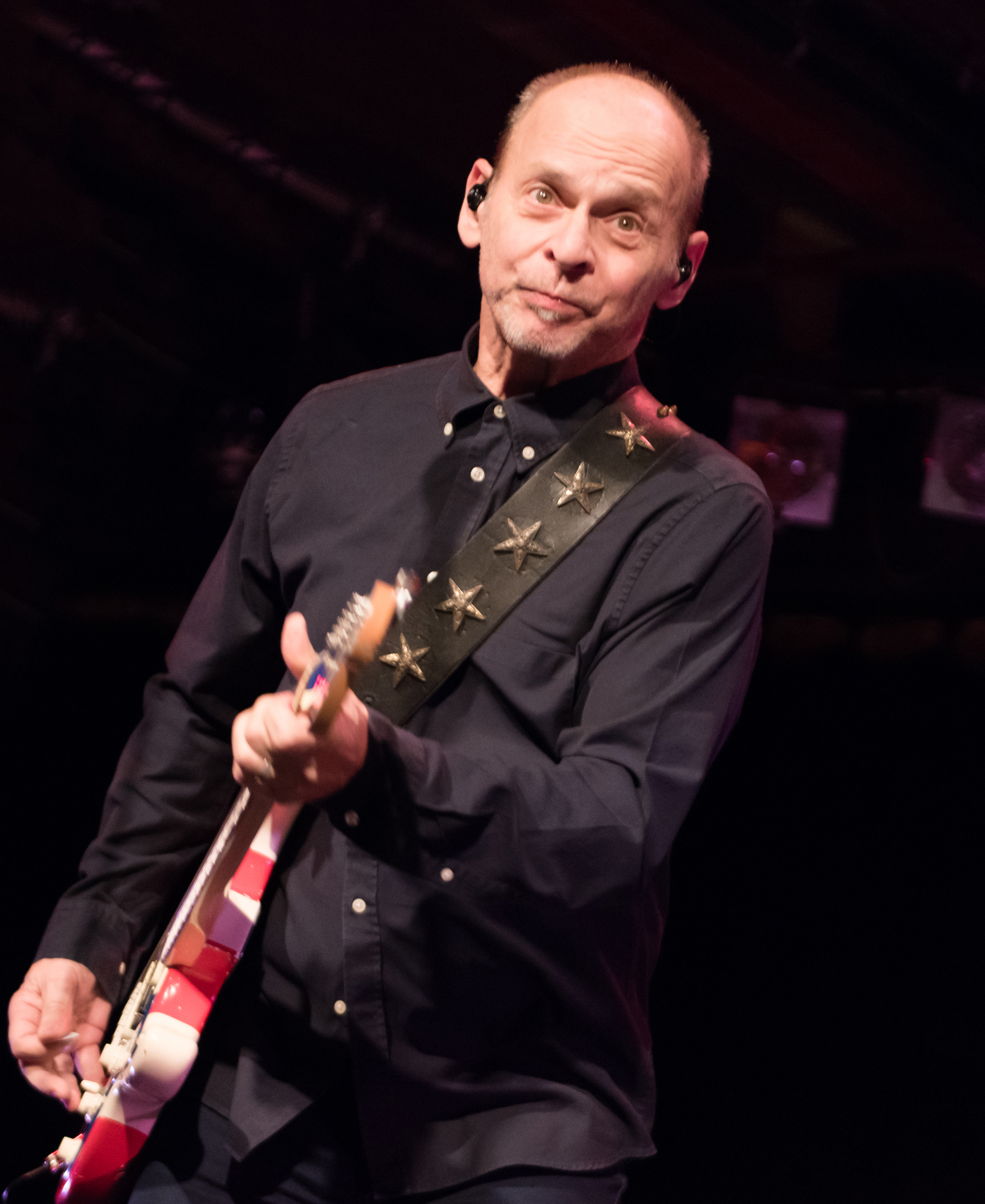
Kramer performing in 2018

The Hard Stuff: Dope, Crime, the MC5, and My Life of Impossibilities, his first memoir, came out the same year.

In 2020, Kramer, Jason Heath and Luke Morrison built the CAPO (Community Arts Programming and Outreach) Center in Los Angeles as a full-service youth center, recording studio, learning laboratory and performance space for justice system-impacted young people.

In 2021, Kramer contributed to the Alice Cooper album, Detroit Stories. He played guitar and supplied backing vocals on the majority of the record, also with numerous song writing credits. The album was a worldwide hit, reaching No. 1 in Germany, No. 4 in the UK, and No. 1 in Billboard's top sales chart as well as many countries around the world.

In March 2022, Kramer declared "I've been thinking it's been a long time since there's been any new MC5 music... I've been busy writing and recording a new album produced by the great Bob Ezrin. And we'll take it to the streets 'cause I feel like we are all MC5."

== Death and tributes ==
Kramer died from pancreatic cancer at a hospital in Los Angeles on February 2, 2024, at the age of 75. His death was announced by the official social media accounts for the MC5, with a statement reading: "Wayne S. Kramer 'PEACE BE WITH YOU' April 30, 1948 – February 2, 2024."

Tom Morello of Rage Against the Machine, who cited Kramer as a major influence, wrote: "His band the MC5 basically invented punk rock music... Wayne came through personal trials of fire with drugs and jail time and emerged a transformed soul who went on to save countless lives through his tireless acts of service."

Vernon Reid of Living Colour also paid tribute to Kramer, who he described as both a "punk rock pioneer" and "guitar badass". Slash posted a tribute stating "My life was forever changed for the better when I met this man."

== Composer ==
Kramer's song "Stranger in the House" was featured on the May 16, 1997, Season 1 finale of Millennium, titled "Paper Dove".

Highlights from his scoring work can be heard in the Will Ferrell comedies Talladega Nights: The Ballad of Ricky Bobby and Step Brothers. Kramer's solo track "Edge of the Switchblade" runs at the beginning of the end credits of the former. He co-composed the score for HBO's controversial 2006 documentary Hacking Democracy, which also featured his song "Something Broken in the Promised Land" as its title track.

Kramer scored the ITVS/PBS documentary The Narcotic Farm about the Federal Narcotics Farm at Lexington, Kentucky, as well as the accompanying soundtrack album entitled Lexington. He also was narrator for the documentary.

Kramer also composed music for television, including themes for Fox Sports Network's 5-4-3-2-1, Spotlight, In My Own Words and Under the Lights; and E!'s Emmy-nominated series Split Ends as well as the "Unlabeled" Jim Beam commercial.

He scored for the HBO comedy series Eastbound & Down, starring Danny McBride and executive produced by Will Ferrell, Adam McKay and Chris Henchy, which premiered in February 2009.

=== Credits ===
- CREEM: America's Only Rock & Roll Magazine (2019), "Composer", Director: Scott Crawford, Producers: J.J. Kramer, Jaan Uhelszki
- Shut It Down (2021),"Composer", Director: David Zeiger, Producers: Displaced Films
- Being Evel (2015), "Additional Music By", Director: Daniel Junge (Jungefilm), Producer: Jeff Tremaine (Dickhouse Productions)
- Algren: Prophet of the Neon Wilderness (2014) "Composer", Director: Michael Caplan, Producer: Nicole Bernardi-Reis (Montrose Pictures)
- Concrete Blondes (2013), "Composer", Sacred Bull Productions/Showtime Networks
- Fully Loaded (2011), "Additional Music By", Director: Shira Piven/Starz
- Salem Rogers (2015), Lindsey Stoddart (Creator/Writer) Pilot w/Leslie Bibb, Rachel Dratch – Amazon Studios
- Why Not? With Shania Twain (2011), Series Season 1 – (All Episodes)
- Oprah Winfrey (OWN) Networks / Gay Rosenthal
- Sonic Revolution (2005), "Mail Title Theme" & "Musical Director", Channel 4 (UK)
- CBGB (2013), "Music Producer", "Because the Night" (The Single) Distributors: Xlrator Media
- The Big Short (2016), "Guitars", Director: Adam McKay
- Russian Five (2018), "Composer", Director: Joshua Riehl, Producers: Jason Wehling, Steve Bannatyne, Jenny Feterovich
- Welcome to Me (2015), "Alice's Title Theme" & "Additional Music By", Director: Shira Piven, Producers: Gary Sanchez (Kristen Wiig, Adam McKay, Will Ferrell)
- Hell & Back (2015), "Original Songs" & "Additional Music By", Directors: Tom Gianas & Ross Shuman, Producers: Corey Campodonico, Alex Bulkley (ShadowMachine)
- House of A Lifetime: Richard Lewis (2014) "Composer", Director: Charley Rivkin / MVD Distributors
- Let Fury Have the Hour (2012) "Composer" Antonino D'Ambrosio
- The Story of Van's (1Q-2016), Television Commercial Composer "Van's Turns 50" – International TV Campaign
- Bad Judge (2014-2015), Series w/Kate Walsh (Star & Exec. Producer) Season 1 – (All Episodes), Director: Betsy Thomas
- Kell On Earth (2009-2010), "Co-Composer", (Various Episodes) - E! Entertainment
- South of Nowhere (2007), Series Additional Score: Nickelodeon Networks
- C.O.G. (2013), "Contributing Score Mixer" & "Music Recordist" Rhino Films / David Sedaris Adaptation
- Guitar Hero World Tour (2009) – Activision

== Influence ==
The Clash refer to Kramer's drug troubles in their 1977 song "Jail Guitar Doors", whose title has been adopted for an initiative set up by Billy Bragg to provide prison inmates with musical equipment:

Let me tell you 'bout Wayne and his deals of cocaine
A little more every day
Holding for a friend till the band do well
Then the DEA locked him away

The 1996 EP Eno Collaboration by Half Man Half Biscuit includes the song "Get Kramer", which begins:

We've got Kramer
Coming over to produce us
So that we can show off to our specialist friends

and ends:

"I'll give you Kick Out The Jams"

Tom Morello of Rage Against the Machine often cites Kramer as a major influence and later performed with him at Axis of Justice shows.

== Selected discography ==
=== With the MC5 ===
- Kick Out the Jams (1969)
- Back in the USA (1970)
- High Time (1971)
- Heavy Lifting (2024)

=== Solo albums ===
- Death Tongue (1991) Curio
- The Hard Stuff (1995) Epitaph Records
- Dangerous Madness (1996) Epitaph Records
- Citizen Wayne (1997) Epitaph Records
- Adult World (2002) MuscleTone
- Lexington (2014) Industrial Amusement

=== Live albums ===
- LLMF (Live Like A Mutherfucker) (1998) Epitaph Records

=== Other albums ===
- Gang War (1990) - Gang War (with Johnny Thunders) [Sonic]
- Dodge Main (1996) - Dodge Main [Alive]
- Mad For The Racket (2000) - The Racketeers [MuscleTone]

=== Diesel Motor Records reissues ===
- The Hard Stuff + (2004)
- More Dangerous Madness (2004)
- The Return of Citizen Wayne (2004)

With others

- Bad Religion, Stranger than Fiction (Atlantic Records, 1994)
- Marshall Crenshaw, Jaggedland (429 Records, 2009)
- Jill Sobule, Jill Sobule (Atlantic Records, 1995)
- Was (Not Was), Was (Not Was) (Island Records, 1981)
- Was (Not Was), Born to Laugh at Tornadoes (Geffen, 1983)
- Was (Not Was), Boo! (Ryko, 2008)
- William Shatner, Seeking Major Tom (Cleopatra Records, 2011)
