= Clash City Rockers =

Single by the Clash

from the album The Clash (US ver.)
- B-side: "Jail Guitar Doors"
- Released: 17 February 1978
- Recorded: October–November 1977
- Studio: CBS (London)
- Genre: Punk rock
- Length: 3:55
- Label: CBS
- Songwriters: Joe Strummer; Mick Jones
- Producer: Mickey Foote

The Clash singles chronology
"Complete Control" (1977)	"Clash City Rockers" (1978)	"(White Man) In Hammersmith Palais" (1978)

"Clash City Rockers" is a song by the English rock band the Clash. It was first released in February 1978 as a single with the B-side "Jail Guitar Doors", the latter a re-worked version of a song from Joe Strummer's pub rock days. "Clash City Rockers" was the second of three non-album singles released between the group's eponymous first album in 1977 and their second album, Give 'Em Enough Rope (1978). It was later included as the opening track of the belated US version of the band's debut album.

== Background ==
The song was first played live at Mont De Marsan (Landes, France), in August 1977, and recorded the same year in the band's October and November sessions at CBS Studios.

== Composition ==
The Clash's first overt attempt at self-mythology, "Clash City Rockers" is, by and large, a song about positivity and moving forward, and revisits themes common in Clash songs of the era, specifically dead-end employment and having a purpose in life. Jones has said that the song "was one of the first numbers we did where we really began to stretch and experiment."

The middle part of the song is based on an old nursery rhyme, "Oranges and Lemons" ("You owe me a move say the bells of St. Groove"), and namechecks David Bowie, Gary Glitter and Prince Far-I. The irony of the line "when I am fitter say the bells of Gary Glitter" following Glitter's later scandal was not lost on Jones, who joked about it in the December 2003 issue of Uncut magazine: "The Gary Glitter lyric? Yeah, that was before the internet. [grins]"

The line in the song about reggae artist Prince Far-I, "No one but you and I say the bells of Prince Far-I", once again shows the group's reggae influences. According to Strummer, the "rockers" in the song are not rock 'n' rollers: "I was talking about rockers which is a certain reggae rhythm".

Despite the reggae references, "Clash City Rockers" is a punk rock song with similarities to early songs by the Who. It reinforced the profile and image of the Clash and their fans as being a gang.

== Recording ==
In December, producer Mickey Foote—Strummer's old sound-man from the 101'ers and producer of The Clash and "White Riot"—increased the speed of the tape for the finished master of the song, after manager Bernie Rhodes decided the song sounded "a bit flat". This technique, known as "varispeeding", rendered the song one semitone higher in pitch. Strummer and Jones were in Jamaica at the time, and when they heard the finished result, they fired Foote. With the exception of the 2000 re-issue of the US version of The Clash, the original version of the song (at the proper speed) has been used on every re-release since.

Paul Simonon told Uncut magazine in 2015 that the recording sessions on the song were strained due to an argument he had been having with Mick Jones: "I seem to remember that, when we did 'Clash City Rockers', him and me had had a row. I was in one corner of the studio and Mick was in the other. He had to tell Joe what the chords were so he could come over and tell me. The guy who was recording it didn’t know what was going on cos of this weird communication breakdown."

== Track listing ==
All tracks written by Joe Strummer/Mick Jones.

7" vinyl

1. "Clash City Rockers" – 3:50
2. "Jail Guitar Doors" – 3:03

== Personnel ==
The Clash

- Joe Strummer – lead vocal, pianos
- Mick Jones – guitars, backing vocals
- Paul Simonon – bass guitar
- Topper Headon – drums

== Charts ==
Chart	Peak position	Date
UK Singles Chart	35	March 1978
