= MC5 =

American rock band

- MC5 in 1970; From left to right: Wayne Kramer, Dennis Thompson, Michael Davis, Fred "Sonic" Smith, and Rob Tyner

Background information
- Also known as: Bounty Hunters; Motor City Five; MC50
- Origin: Lincoln Park, Michigan, U.S.
- Genres: Hard rock; garage rock; proto-punk; blues rock; psychedelic rock
- Years active: 1963–1972; 1974–1975; 1992; 2003–2011; 2018–2020; 2022–2024
- Labels: Elektra; Atlantic; Rhino
- Past members: Wayne Kramer; Fred "Sonic" Smith; Rob Tyner; Michael Davis; Dennis Thompson; Leo LeDuc; Billy Vargo; Bob Gaspar; Patrick Burrows; Steve "Annapurna" Moorhouse; Derek Hughes; Ray Craig; Ritchie Dharma; Frank Lowenberg; Bob Schultz; Mark Manko; Tim Schafe; Handsome Dick Manitoba; Gilby Clarke; Marcus Durant; Kim Thayil; Doug Pinnick; Billy Gould; Matt Cameron; Don Was; Brendan Canty; Brad Brooks

MC5 (also known as the Motor City Five) was an American rock band formed in Lincoln Park, Michigan, in 1963. The classic lineup consisted of vocalist Rob Tyner, guitarists Wayne Kramer and Fred "Sonic" Smith, bassist Michael Davis, and drummer Dennis Thompson. MC5 were listed by Parade as one of the best rock bands of all time and by VH1 as one of the greatest hard rock artists of all time. The band's music is widely recognized as influential, and their 1969 song "Kick Out the Jams" has been covered by many artists.

"Crystallizing the counterculture movement at its most volatile and threatening", according to AllMusic critic Stephen Thomas Erlewine, MC5's leftist political ties and anti-establishment lyrics and music positioned them as pioneers of the punk movement in the United States. Their loud, energetic style of back-to-basics rock and roll included elements of garage rock, hard rock, blues rock, and psychedelic rock. Guitarist Tom Morello described MC5 as having "basically invented punk rock."

MC5 had a promising beginning that earned them a January 1969 cover appearance on Rolling Stone and a story written by Eric Ehrmann before their debut live album was released. They developed a reputation for energetic and polemical live performances, one of which was recorded as their 1969 debut album Kick Out the Jams. The band released the studio albums Back in the USA and High Time before disbanding in 1972.

Vocalist Tyner died of a heart attack in late 1991 at the age of 46 and was followed by Fred Smith, who also died of a heart attack, in 1994 at the age of 46. The remaining three members reformed in 2003 with the Dictators' singer Handsome Dick Manitoba as its new vocalist, and this reformed lineup occasionally performed live over the next nine years until Davis died of liver failure in 2012 at the age of 68.

In 2022, Kramer announced that a tour under the banner of We Are All MC5 would take place that spring, and that a new MC5 studio album with producer Bob Ezrin would also be released later that year with original MC5 drummer Dennis Thompson playing on two tracks. In 2023, Kramer announced that the album would be released in the spring of 2024. Kramer died February 2, 2024, leaving Thompson as the only surviving original member of the band. In 2024, the MC5 were inducted into the Rock and Roll Hall of Fame in the musical excellence category. On May 9, 2024, Thompson died at the age of 75. Heavy Lifting, their final album, was released on October 18, 2024.

== History ==
=== 1963–1967: Formation and early years ===
The origins of MC5 can be traced to the friendship between guitarists Wayne Kramer and Fred Smith. Friends since their teen years, they were both fans of R&B music, blues, Chuck Berry, Dick Dale, The Ventures, and what was later called garage rock. They adored any music with speed, energy and a rebellious attitude. Each guitarist/singer formed and led a rock group (Smith's Vibratones and Kramer's Bounty Hunters). As members of both groups left for college or straight jobs, the most committed members eventually united (under Kramer's leadership and the "Bounty Hunters" name) with Billy Vargo on guitar and Leo LeDuc on drums (at this point Smith played bass). They were popular and successful enough in and around Detroit that the musicians were able to quit their day jobs and make a living from the group.

Kramer felt that they needed a manager, which led him to Rob Derminer, a few years older than the others, and deeply involved in Detroit's hipster and left-wing political scenes. Derminer originally auditioned as a bass guitarist (a role which he held briefly in 1964, with Smith switching to guitar to replace Vargo and with Bob Gaspar replacing LeDuc). They quickly realized that Derminer's talents could be better used as a lead singer: Though not conventionally attractive and rather paunchy by traditional frontman standards, he nonetheless had a commanding stage presence, and a booming baritone voice that evidenced his abiding love of American soul and gospel music. Derminer renamed himself Rob Tyner (after John Coltrane's pianist McCoy Tyner). Instead of Derminer, their manager ended up being Ann Marston, a former national archery champion and beauty pageant winner.

Tyner also conceived their new name, MC5, short for "Motor City Five" based on their Detroit roots. In some ways the group was similar to other garage bands of the period, composing soon-to-be historic workouts such as "Black to Comm" during their mid-teens in the basement of the home of Kramer's mother. Upon Tyner's switch from bassist to vocalist, he was initially replaced by Patrick Burrows before the lineup stabilized in 1965 with the arrival of Michael Davis and Dennis Thompson to replace Burrows and Gaspar, respectively.

The music also reflected Smith and Kramer's increasing interest in free jazz—the guitarists were inspired by the likes of Albert Ayler, Archie Shepp, Sun Ra and late period John Coltrane, and tried to imitate the ecstatic sounds of the squealing, high-pitched saxophonists they adored. MC5 even later opened a few U.S. midwest shows for Sun Ra, whose influence is obvious in "Starship". Kramer and Smith were also deeply inspired by Sonny Sharrock, one of the few electric guitarists working in free jazz, and they eventually developed a unique interlocking style that was like little heard before: Kramer's solos often used a heavy, irregular vibrato, while Smith's rhythms contained an uncommon explosive energy, including patterns that conveyed great excitement, as evidenced in "Black to Comm" and many other songs.

Playing almost nightly any place they could in and around Detroit, MC5 quickly earned a reputation for high-energy live performances and won a sizeable local following, regularly drawing sellout audiences of 1000 or more. Contemporary rock writer Robert Bixby stated that their sound was like "a catastrophic force of nature the band was barely able to control". Don McLeese noted that fans compared the aftermath of an MC5 performance to the delirious exhaustion after "a street rumble or an orgy".

"When I first saw them, it was before they wrote songs, or it was before they met John Sinclair," recalled Iggy Pop. "They were just a really fuckin' good big city cover band, and they covered basically The Stones, Hendrix, The Who, all that shit, real well. And then they knew a little Ray Charles and shit. As they developed, I thought there was an overlay of jazz, but a lot of the music values were very hard rock. Not too bluesy."

MC5 released a cover of Them's "I Can Only Give You Everything", backed with their own "One of the Guys", on the tiny AMG label in 1967.

=== 1968–1969: Kick Out the Jams ===
In early 1968, the band's second single was released by Trans-Love Energies on A-Square records (though without the knowledge of that label's owner Jeep Holland). Housed in a striking picture sleeve, it comprised two original songs: "Borderline" and "Looking at You". The first pressing sold out in a few weeks, and by year's end it had gone through more pressings totaling several thousand copies. A third single that coupled "I Can Only Give You Everything" with the original "I Just Don't Know" appeared at about the same time on the AMG label, as well.

That summer MC5 toured the East Coast of the United States, which generated an enormous response, with the group often overshadowing the more famous acts they opened up for: McLeese writes that when opening for Big Brother and the Holding Company, audiences regularly demanded multiple encores of MC5, and at a memorable series of concerts, Cream—one of the leading hard rock groups of the era—"left the stage vanquished". This same east coast tour led to MC5's association with the radical group Up Against the Wall Motherfucker.

MC5 became the leading band in a burgeoning hard rock scene, serving as mentors to fellow South-Eastern Michigan bands The Stooges and The Up, and major record labels expressed an interest in the group. As related in the notes for reissued editions of the Stooges' debut album, Danny Fields of Elektra Records came to Detroit to see MC5. At Kramer's recommendation, he went to see The Stooges. Fields was so impressed that he ended up offering contracts to both bands in September 1968. They were the first hard rock groups signed to Elektra Records.

According to Kramer, MC5 of this period was politically influenced by the Marxism of the Black Panther Party and Fred Hampton, and poets of the Beat Generation such as Allen Ginsberg and Ed Sanders, or Modernist poets like Charles Olson. Black Panther Party founder Huey P. Newton prompted John Sinclair to found the White Panthers, a militant leftist organization of white people working to assist the Black Panthers. Shortly after, Sinclair was arrested for possession of marijuana.

Under the "guidance" of John Sinclair (who dubbed his enterprise "Trans-Love Energies" and refused to be categorized as a traditional manager), MC5 were soon involved in left-wing politics: Sinclair was active with the White Panther Party and Fifth Estate. In their early career, MC5 had a politically provocative stage show: They appeared onstage toting unloaded rifles, and at the climax of a performance, an unseen "sniper" would shoot Tyner. The band members were also all using the drugs LSD and marijuana.

Hippies at a live music festival in Lincoln Park, Chicago. MC5 can be seen playing - Sunday, August 25, 1968

The band performed as part of the protests against the Vietnam War at the 1968 Democratic National Convention in Chicago that were broken up by a police riot. The group's appearance at the convention is also notable for their lengthy performance. What was also notable was that they were also the only musical band to perform during the 1968 DNC protests. In an interview featured in the documentary Get Up, Stand Up, Kramer reported that while many musicians were scheduled to perform at a day-long concert, only the MC5 initially appeared. The MC5 played for over eight hours straight. Of the other scheduled performers, Kramer stated in Get Up, Stand Up that only Neil Young actually arrived, though due to the chaos at the convention, Young didn't perform. Dennis Thompson alleged years later that Country Joe McDonald (of Country Joe and the Fish) was also present at the scene. However, aside from members of MC5, the only other singer who was acknowledged to have performed at the convention protests was protest folk singer Phil Ochs. According to the Bethel Woods Center for the Arts, Bruce Barthol was the only member of Country Joe and the Fish who was willing to perform, with other members of the band fearing a potential riot.

MC5 had a promising beginning that earned them a January 1969 cover appearance on Rolling Stone and a story written by Eric Ehrmann before their debut live album was released. The band earned national attention with their first album, Kick Out the Jams, recorded live on October 30 and 31, 1968, at Detroit's Grande Ballroom. Elektra executive Jac Holzman and producer Bruce Botnick recognized that MC5 were at their best when playing for a receptive audience. Containing such songs as the proto-punk classics "Kick Out the Jams" and "Rocket Reducer No. 62 (Rama Lama Fa Fa Fa)", the spaced-out "Starship" (co-credited to Sun Ra because the lyrics were partly cribbed from one of Ra's poems), and an extended cover of John Lee Hooker's "Motor City Is Burning" wherein Tyner praises the role of the Black Panthers during the Detroit riots of 1967. Critic Mark Deming writes that Kick out the Jams "is one of the most powerfully energetic live albums ever made ... this is an album that refuses to be played quietly."

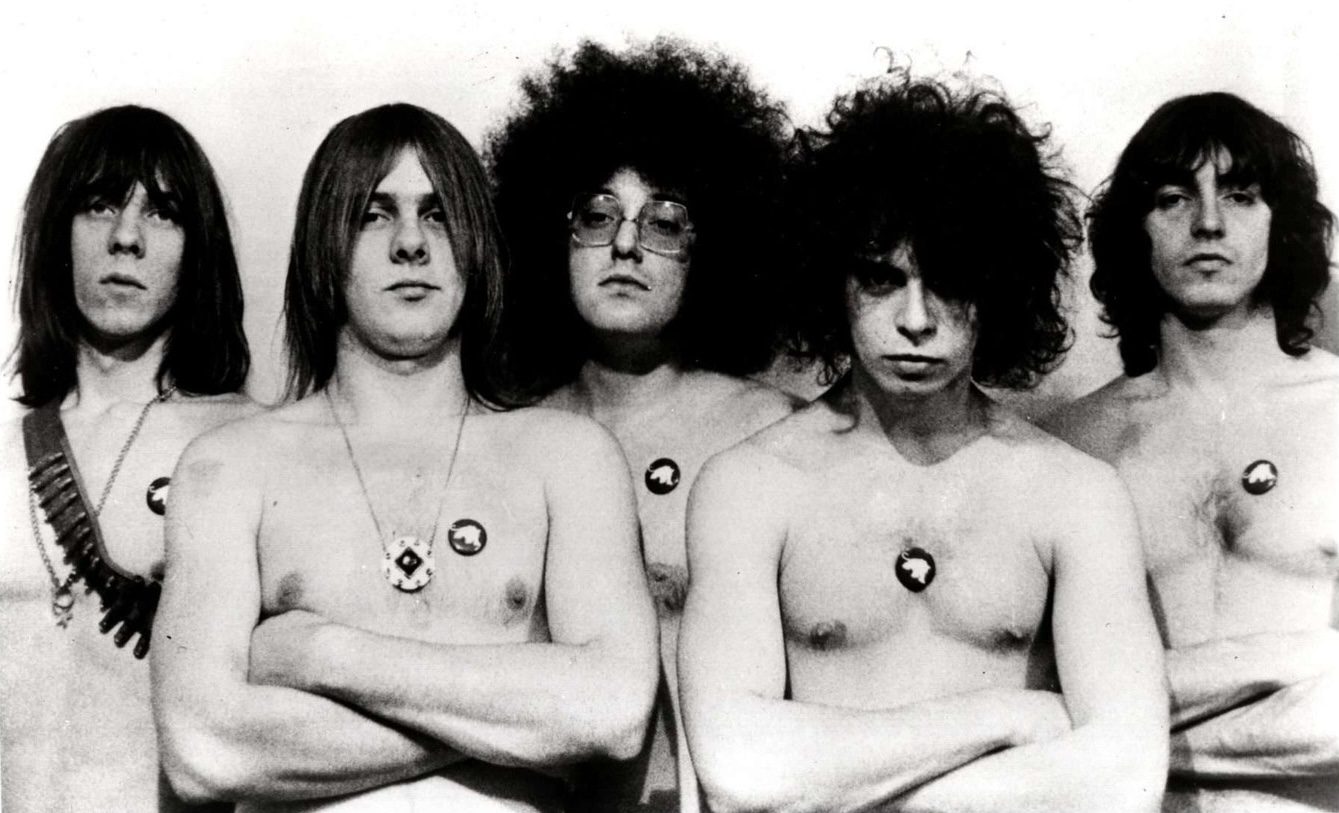
The MC5 in 1969, wearing White Panther Party buttons. Photo by White Panther Party photographer Leni Sinclair.

The album caused some controversy due to Sinclair's inflammatory liner notes and the title track's rallying cry of "Kick out the jams, motherfuckers!" According to Kramer, the band recorded this as "Kick out the jams, brothers and sisters!" for the single released for radio play; Tyner claimed this was done without group consensus. The edited version also appeared in some LP copies, which also withdrew Sinclair's excitable comments. The album was released in January 1969; reviews were mixed, but the album was relatively successful, quickly selling over 100,000 copies and peaking at No. 30 on the Billboard album chart in May 1969 during a 23-week stay.

When Hudson's, a Detroit-based department store chain, refused to stock Kick Out the Jams due to the obscenity, MC5 responded with a full page advertisement in the local underground magazine Fifth Estate saying "Stick Alive with the MC5, and Fuck Hudson's!", prominently including the logo of MC5's label, Elektra Records, in the ad. Hudson's pulled all Elektra records from their stores, and in the ensuing controversy, Jac Holzman, the head of Elektra, dropped the band from their contract. MC5 then signed with Atlantic Records.

=== 1970–1971: Back in the USA and High Time ===
Their second album, Back in the USA was produced by future Bruce Springsteen mentor Jon Landau. Released on Atlantic with a vastly different production and marketing effort, the band's sound radically differed from Kick Out the Jams, to such an extent that, except for Tyner's vocals, they were "barely recognizable as the same band." The second album's production also sounded compressed and somewhat limited in the band's sonic palette compared to their earlier — band members later said that Landau was overbearing and heavy-handed in production, trying to shape the group to his own liking.

Reviews were again mixed, resulting in mediocre sales (it only peaked at No. 137 in the American chart in March 1970 during a seven-week stay), while the band's tours were not as well-received as before. Exhaustion was partly to blame, from the band's heavy touring schedule and increasingly heavy drug use.

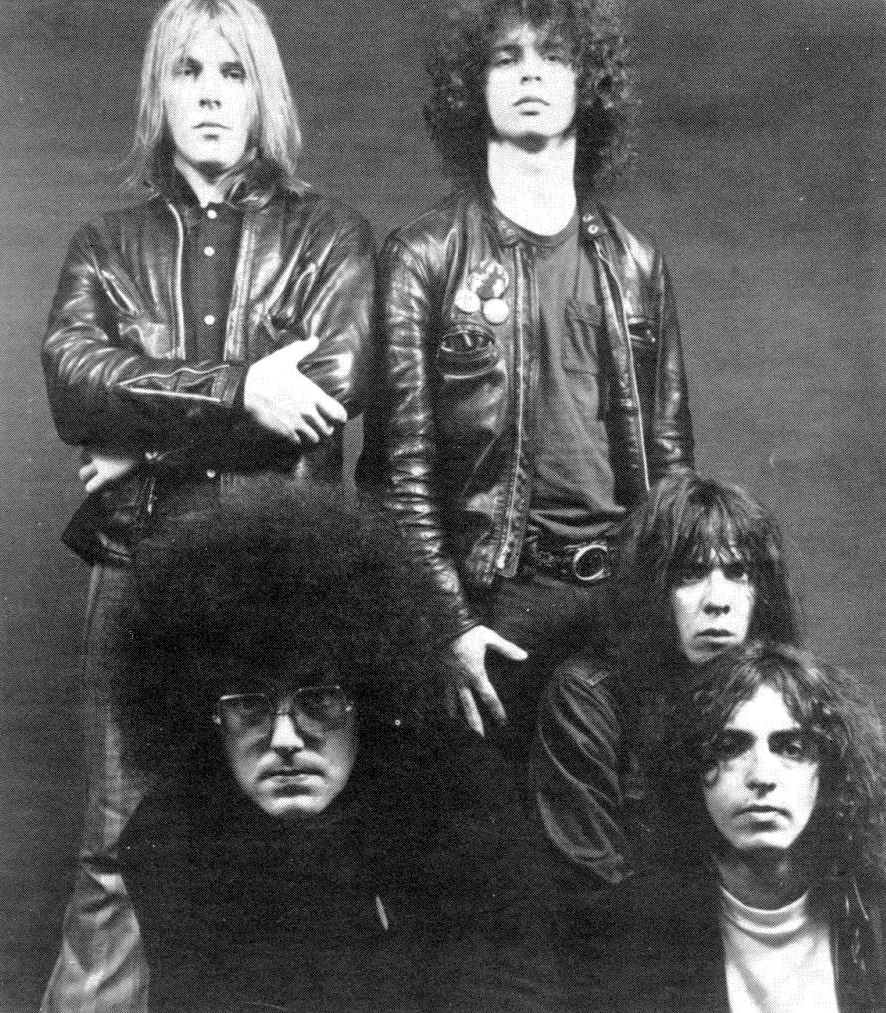
The MC5 in 1970

They had fallen out with Sinclair as well, and were conspicuously not allowed to play at the December 1971 John Sinclair Freedom Rally, organized to protest his incarceration on marijuana possession, even though they were at the gig.

The band's third album, High Time, produced by Geoffrey Haslam and recorded by Artie Fields, proved influential on 1970s hard rock bands. The album was poorly promoted, and sales were worse than ever, but High Time was the best-reviewed of the band's original records upon its initial release. The group had much more creative control, and were very satisfied with the results. This release saw the band stretch out with longer, more experimental pieces like "Future/Now" and the Sun Ra-influenced "Skunk (Sonicly Speaking)" [sic].

Both Back in the USA and High Time lost money for Atlantic Records, which dropped the band. Early in 1972, the band toured Europe, playing dates in England including Cambridge with Syd Barrett's band Stars and Canterbury with former Tyrannosaurus Rex percussionist Steve Peregrin Took, as well as a TV session in Bremen, Germany for Beat Club.

=== 1972–1991: Disbandment and post-break up ===
On February 13, 1972, Michael Davis left the band (he was using heroin and was all but forced out by the others), and was replaced by a series of bassists (Steve Moorhouse, Derek Hughes, and Ray Craig). The remaining members recorded three new songs—"Gold" (also known as "Gold Rush"), "Train Music" and "Inside Out"—in London shortly afterwards for the soundtrack of a film called Gold. This was the band's final recording session.

The group continued on a little while longer, eventually reduced to Kramer, Smith, and Tyner touring and playing with Ritchie Dharma on drums and Derek Hughes on bass, playing R&B covers as much as their original material.

MC5 reunited for a farewell show on December 31, 1972 at the Grande Ballroom. The venue that had only a few years before hosted over a thousand eager fans now had a few dozen people. Distraught and also in the throes of drug addiction, Kramer left the stage after only a few songs. The group disbanded not long after the event.

In 1973, Fred "Sonic" Smith formed a new group called Ascension, consisting of Smith on guitar, Thompson on drums, Davis on piano, and to replace Davis on bass a local working bass player, John Hefty, was brought in. They assembled a set of mostly original music and a few R&B and rock covers. Smith said the name Ascension symbolized the music and the band ascending to new heights and in new directions. They brought in a new manager, Chato Hill. They played only a few live performances and disbanded after less than a year. One live recording was made but never edited or released.

After this, Smith formed a new group called Sonic's Rendezvous Band, married singer Patti Smith, retired from music to raise a family, and died in 1994. Sonic's Rendezvous Band released only the "City Slang" single during their initial time as a group, though later recordings were released posthumously, and a reconstituted Rendezvous Band (including original member Scott Morgan, of The Rationals and a newly added Deniz Tek of Radio Birdman) reunited in tribute, years afterward. Smith also co-produced his wife's 1988 album Dream of Life and co-wrote all the songs with her, including the single "People Have the Power."

Wayne Kramer recruited Mark Manko on rhythm guitar, Tim Schafe on bass, Bob Schultz on organ, and Frank Lowenberg on drums for a new lineup of the MC5 in 1974, with Kramer singing most of the vocals. He also made scattered appearances on other people's records before being incarcerated from 1975 through 1978 for drug offenses. While in federal prison in Kentucky, he was unexpectedly reunited with MC5 bassist Michael Davis, also behind bars on a drug charge. After he was released in 1979, Kramer went on to play with the bands Was (Not Was) with Don Was and Gang War with Johnny Thunders. Kramer worked straight jobs for several years and focused on kicking drugs. By the early 1990s, he returned to the music industry and subsequently released several well-received albums.

Rob Tyner performed under his own name for many years but also performed under "The New MC5" for some live gigs for a brief period. He also collaborated with Eddie and the Hot Rods, releasing a 7" with them in 1979. During the mid-1980s, Tyner produced a single for Detroit band Vertical Pillows, and occasionally made brief guest appearances during some of their live shows, singing MC5 covers. Tyner became a successful producer, manager and promoter in Detroit, and released the warmly-reviewed Blood Brothers album in 1990, a year before his death in September 1991.

Michael Davis joined Detroit band Destroy All Monsters for several years in the late 70s /early 80s; the band broke up in 1983. Dennis Thompson played with various bands, including The New Order, New Race, The Motor City Bad Boys, and The Secrets.

The first public reunion of the band after their recording years as a group was as a four-piece, at a performance celebrating the life of the late Rob Tyner, a concert event at the State Theatre in Detroit on February 22, 1992. The event was heavily attended, and included The Rationals, Scott Richardson of SRC, The Romantics, Dee Dee Ramone, The Cult, and other musicians. The band on this evening was unbilled, but their appearance had been rumored—Wayne Kramer was the only group member advertised—and the set lasted about thirty minutes. The recording of this show remains unreleased.

=== 2002–2012: DKT/MC5 ===
In 2002, the well-received documentary MC5: A True Testimonial made its film festival premiere. 2003 saw the three surviving members of MC5—Kramer, bassist Michael Davis, and drummer Dennis Thompson (Smith had died in 1994)—performing as the MC5 at the 100 Club in London with Fred "Sonic" Smith's place temporarily being taken by Nicke Andersson of The Hellacopters, vocals by David Vanian of The Damned, Lemmy of Motörhead, Ian Astbury of The Cult, and singer Kate O'Brien, as well as seeing Charles Moore and Buzzy Jones reprise their roles in the brass section from the High Time album.

In 2004, the band set out on an extensive world tour using the name DKT/MC5 (DKT being an acronym for Davis, Kramer, and Thompson). As with the 100 Club concert, a host of special guests joined them on tour such as Mark Arm of Mudhoney, Nicke Royale of The Hellacopters, Evan Dando of The Lemonheads, Marshall Crenshaw, Deniz Tek of Radio Birdman, Lisa Kekaula of the Bellrays, and others.

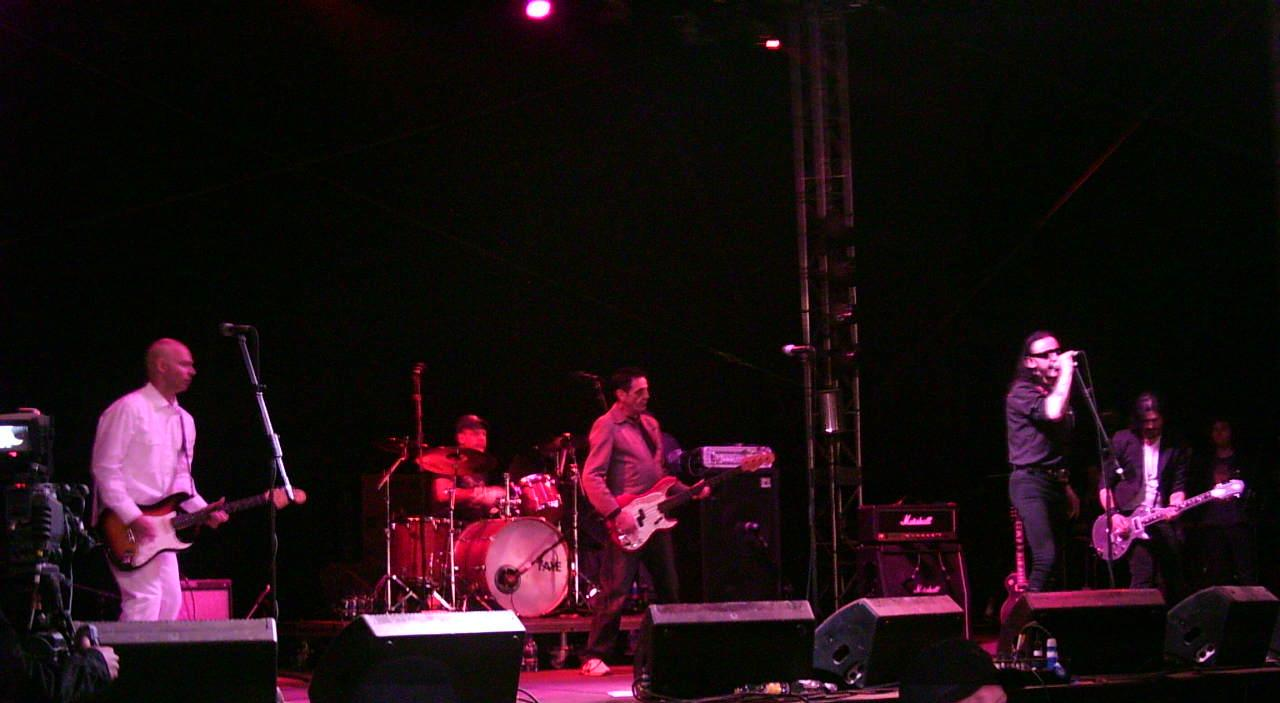
MC5 and Motörhead's Lemmy Kilmister in 2005. L-R: Wayne Kramer, Dennis Thompson, Michael Davis, Lemmy, and Gilby Clarke.

In 2005, MC5 stabilized into a new lineup, consisting of Kramer, Thompson, and Davis, with Handsome Dick Manitoba, vocalist of the 1970s New York punk band The Dictators, singing lead, along with Gilby Clarke, formerly of Guns and Roses, playing rhythm guitar. This lineup continued to exist until Michael Davis' death in February 2012, upon which the group disbanded.

In May 2006, Davis injured his back in a motorcycle accident. In August 2007, Davis joined the Lords of Altamont on bass. He also founded and led the Michael H. Davis Music Is Revolution Foundation, dedicated to supporting music education programs in public schools. In 2009, Kramer founded the independent initiative Jail Guitar Doors, USA with Billy Bragg and Margaret Saadi Kramer. In 2011, MC5 was voted into the Michigan Rock and Roll Legends Hall of Fame. In February 2012, Davis died of liver failure at the age of 68.

=== 2018–2024: MC50 tour and Heavy Lifting ===
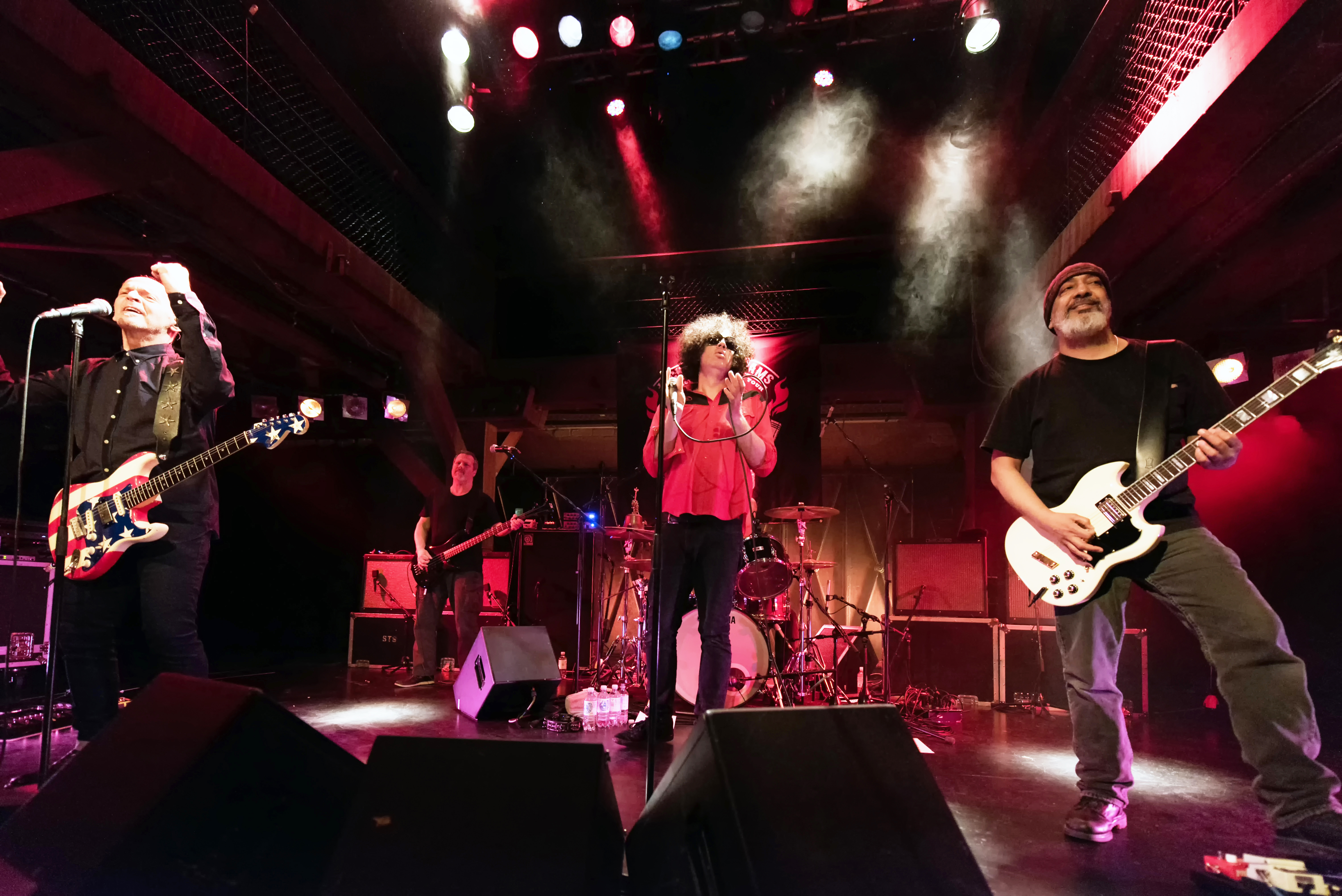
MC5 performing in 2018. L–R: Wayne Kramer, bassist Billy Gould, vocalist Marcus Durant, drummer Brendan Canty (obscured by Durant), and guitarist Kim Thayil.

In May 2018, Kramer announced the MC50 tour to celebrate the 50th anniversary of Kick Out the Jams, with a lineup including himself, plus rock stalwarts Kim Thayil and Matt Cameron of Soundgarden, Brendan Canty of Fugazi, and Doug Pinnick of King's X, as well as Marcus Durant and Don Was. Pinnick was eventually replaced by Faith No More bassist Billy Gould. Thompson did not take part in the MC50 tour, which concluded in Christchurch, New Zealand in February 2020.

In 2022, Kramer announced that a tour under the banner of We Are All MC5 would take place that spring, and that a new MC5 studio album with veteran producer Bob Ezrin would also be released later that year with original MC5 drummer Dennis Thompson playing on two tracks. Joining Kramer on "The Heavy Lifting Tour" is singer Brad Brooks, guitarist Stevie Salas, bassist Vicki Randle, and drummer Winston Watson, who replaces originally named drummer Stephen Perkins. In addition to San Francisco Bay area singer-songwriter Brooks, Native American Salas is a former advisor of contemporary music at the Smithsonian National Museum of the American Indian, Randle is known as the first permanent female member of The Tonight Show Band from 1992 to 2010, and Watson performed 400 shows with Bob Dylan from 1992 over five years of his Never Ending Tour. In 2023, Kramer announced that the new album would be released in the spring of 2024.

On February 2, 2024, Kramer died after being diagnosed the previous month with pancreatic cancer. In April 2024, John Sinclair, who previously served as MC5's manager and who was also instrumental in the band's political activism, died as well.

In April 2024, the MC5 was selected for induction into the Rock and Roll Hall of Fame in the musical excellence category.

Thompson died of a heart attack on May 8, 2024, at the age of 75. The MC5's final album, Heavy Lifting, was posthumously released on October 18, 2024.

== Band members ==
=== Classic lineup ===
- Wayne Kramer – lead guitar, backing and lead vocals (1963–1972, 1974–1975, 1992, 2003–2012, 2018–2020, 2022–2024; his death)
- Fred "Sonic" Smith – rhythm guitar, backing and lead vocals (1964–1972, 1992; died 1994), bass guitar (1963–1964)
- Rob Tyner – lead vocals (1965–1972; died 1991), bass guitar (1964)
- Dennis Thompson – drums (1965–1972, 1992, 2003–2012, 2022–2024; his death)
- Michael Davis – bass guitar, backing vocals (1965–1972, 1992, 2003–2012; his death)

== Discography ==
Studio

- Back in the USA (1970) No. 137 US
- High Time (1971) No. 191 US
- Heavy Lifting (2024)

Live

- Kick Out the Jams (1969) No. 30 US; No. 37 Canada
- Do It (recorded 1971, released 1987)
- Teen Age Lust (recorded 1970, released 1996)
- Phun City, UK (recorded 1970, released 1996)
- Live at the Sturgis Armoury (recorded 1968, released 1998)
- Are You Ready to Testify?: The Live Bootleg Anthology (2005)
- Live at the Grande Ballroom 68 (2006)
- 10 X MC5 LIVE (recorded 2018, released 2024) - 'Heavy Lifting' bonus disk
- 10 MORE (recorded 2018, released 2025)

Compilations

- Babes in Arms (1983)
- Black to Comm (1994)
- Power Trip (1994)
- Looking at You (1995)
- The American Ruse (1995)
- Ice Pick Slim (1997)
- 66 Breakout (1999)
- Thunder Express (1999) (Recorded in 1972)
- The Big Bang!: Best of the MC5 (2000)
- Part Of The Problem Or Part Of The Solution (2012)
- Kick Out the Jams Motherf*cker (2015)
- The Motor City Five (2017) (Rhino Entertainment Company, by Run Out Groove), ROGV-003

Unreleased

- Live on Saturn (1972)

Box sets

- Purity Accuracy (2004)
- Total Assault (2018)

Singles

- "I Can Only Give You Everything" (1967)
- "Looking at You" (1968)
- "Kick Out the Jams" (1969)
- "Ramblin' Rose" (1969)
- "Tonight" (1969)
- "I Can Only Give You Everything" (Re-issue) (1969)
- "Shakin' Street" (1970)
- "Back in the USA" (1970)
- "Over and Over"/"Sister Anne" (1971) (never officially released, only test pressings exist)
- "Boys Who Play with Matches" (2024)
- "Can't Be Found" (2024)
- "Heavy Lifting" (2024)

Other appearances

- Gold (film) (1972)
- Gold - Original Soundtrack (1972)
- Rubáiyát - Plunderphonics (1991)

== Filmography ==
- MC5: Kick Out the Jams, 1999
- MC5: A True Testimonial, 2002
- Louder Than Love: The Grande Ballroom Story, 2012
- Danny Says, 2016

== See also ==
- Music and politics
- Music of Detroit
- New Left
- List of proto-punk bands
- List of hard rock bands
