= Zen Guerrilla =

American rock band

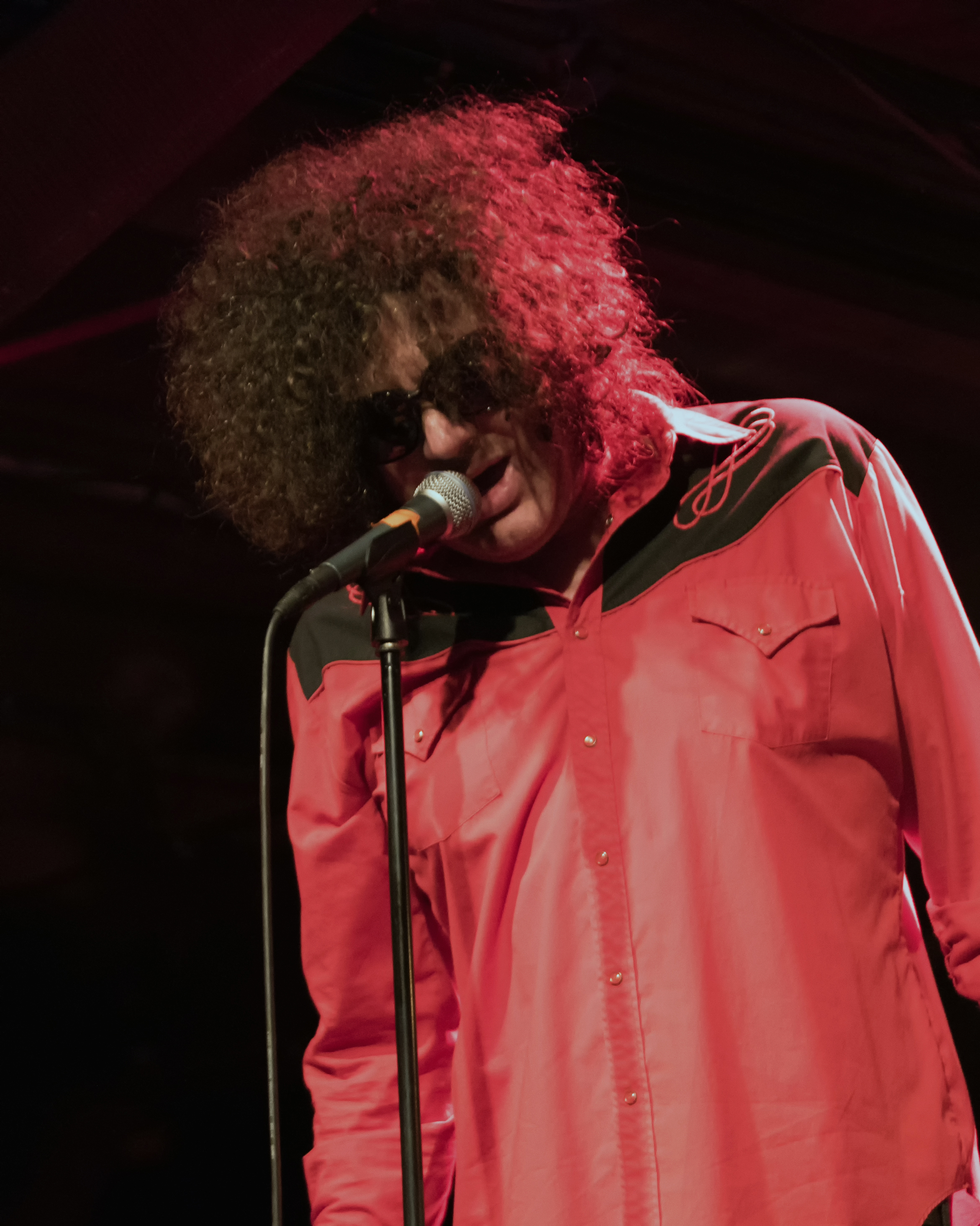
Singer Marcus Durant in 2018

Zen Guerrilla was a rock band originally from Newark, Delaware and later based in San Francisco, California. Musically, the band evolved over their career. Their early sound was characterized by psychedelic elements, such as delayed guitars and noise washes. While their unique sound gained them a sizable local following (winning several Philly music awards), they never broke into any of the major charts. Later, Zen Guerrilla fused blues, rock and gospel to create a sound which could be likened to bands such as the Jon Spencer Blues Explosion.

== History ==
Zen Guerrilla formed in Newark, Delaware, in the late 1980s. Band members Andy Duvall (drums), Marcus Durant (vocals/harmonica), Carl Horne (bass), Daniel McMullen (keyboard), and Rich Millman (guitar) came together from local bands Marcus Hook, the Gollywogs, Stone Groove, and No Comment.

Later, the band released their self-titled CD on Philadelphia-based Compulsiv Records in 1992 and recorded at the world-famous Third Story Recording Studio in Walnut Hill with producer/engineer, Scott Herzog. Soon after, Zen Guerrilla moved to Philadelphia and were regular performers around the city at clubs such as the Khyber Pass Pub. Around this time the band began a heavy touring schedule, which would have them cross the country multiple times through the end of the decade.

Zen Guerrilla relocated to San Francisco in 1994. Their constant touring increased their exposure, and, combined with their explosive live show, helped to release albums first with Alternative Tentacles and later Sub Pop, which is known for being the original record company of Nirvana.

The band's version of the song "Empty Heart" was featured in the 2000 PlayStation game Grind Session.

The band dissolved sometime around 2003.

== Discography ==
=== Albums ===
- Zen Guerrilla - Compulsiv 1992
- Invisible "Liftee" Pad / Gap-Tooth Clown - Alternative Tentacles 1997
- Positronic Raygun - Alternative Tentacles 1998
- Trance States in Tongues - Sub Pop 1999
- Shadows on the Sun - Sub Pop 2001
- Heavy Mellow - Flapping Jet 2002 (LP picture disc)

=== EPs ===
- Creature Double Feature - Dead Beat records 1995
- Invisible "Liftee" Pad - Insect 1996
- Gap-Tooth Clown - Insect 1997
- Plasmic Tears and the Invisible City - Insect 2002

=== Singles ===
- "Pull" b/w "Nile Song" - Union Hall 1993
- "Crow" b/w "Unusual" - Union Hall 1994
- "Trouble Shake" b/w "Change Gonna Come" - Alternative Tentacles 1997
- "Ghetto City Version" b/w "Hungry Wolf" - Epitaph 1999
- "Mama's Little Rocket" - Allied Recordings 2000
- "Dirty Mile" b/w "Ham and Eggs" - Estrus 2000
- "Pocketful of String" b/w "Wigglin' Room" - Fanboy 2000
- "The Seeker" b/w "Half Step" - Sub Pop 2000
- "Mob Rules" b/w "The Trooper" - Safety Pin 2001
