= Kick Out the Jams =

Live album by MC5
- Released: February 1969
- Recorded: October 30–31, 1968
- Venues: Grande Ballroom, Detroit, Michigan
- Genres: Proto-punk; garage rock; hard rock; punk rock; heavy metal
- Length: 39:52
- Label: Elektra
- Producers: Jac Holzman; Bruce Botnick

MC5 chronology
Kick Out the Jams (1969)	Back in the USA (1970)

Singles from Kick Out the Jams
- 1. "Kick Out the Jams" / "Motor City Is Burning" Released: March 1969; 2. "Ramblin' Rose" / "Borderline" Released: 22 August 1969

Kick Out the Jams is the debut album by American rock band MC5. A live album, it was recorded at the Grande Ballroom in Detroit over two nights, October 30 and 31, 1968, and released in February 1969, by Elektra Records.

The album peaked at No. 30 on the Billboard 200 chart, with the title track peaking at No. 82 on the Billboard Hot 100. Although the album initially received an unfavorable review from Rolling Stone upon its release, it has gone on to be considered an important forerunner to punk rock music, and was ranked number 294 in both 2003 and 2012 editions of Rolling Stone's "The 500 Greatest Albums of All Time" lists, with it dropping to number 349 in a 2020 revised list.

== Background and release ==
The album peaked at number 30 on the Billboard albums chart, "in the wake of a publicity blitz", wrote Robert Christgau in Christgau's Record Guide: Rock Albums of the Seventies (1981). In Canada, the album reached #37.

While "Ramblin' Rose" and "Motor City Is Burning" open with the band's typical leftist and revolutionary rhetoric, it was the opening line to the title track that stirred up controversy. Vocalist Rob Tyner shouted, "And right now ... right now ... right now it's time to ... kick out the jams, motherfuckers!" before the opening riffs. Elektra Records executives were offended by the line and had preferred to edit it out of the album (replacing the offending words with "brothers and sisters"), while the band and manager John Sinclair adamantly opposed this.

However in 2002, Wayne Kramer explained to NPR's Terry Gross on her show, Fresh Air, the band understood and accepted the single needed to be recorded without the profanity.

[W]e weren't complete idiots about it, you know, we knew that that would never be played on the radio. So we recorded an alternative intro, which was kick out the jams, brothers and sisters. And, you know, it might be an interesting footnote to look at it because what happened was we had agreed – we knew that, I mean, kick out the jams MF was not going to be a hit single. So we did this other version. And what we told Elektra Records was that we knew when the album version, the real version hit the stands that the stuff was going to hit the fan. But let the single get as firmly established in the charts as it can. Wait till it starts coming back down the charts before you put the album out ... because then we'll be a bona fide hit band. And then the controversy will work in our favor ... And the record company, in all their shortsighted lack of wisdom, when the single started going up the charts, they rushed the album out. And when they rushed the album out, of course, the stuff did hit the fan and the – and people started to be arrested for selling the album.

The original release had "kick out the jams, Motherfuckers!" printed on the inside album cover, but was soon pulled from stores. Two versions were then released, both with censored album covers, with the uncensored audio version sold behind record counters.

The controversy escalated further when Hudson's department stores refused to carry the album. Tensions between the band and the Hudson's chain escalated to the point that the department stores refused to carry any album from the Elektra label after MC5 took out a full-page ad that, according to Danny Fields, "was just a picture of Rob Tyner, and all it said was 'Fuck Hudson's.' And it had the Elektra logo". To end the conflict and to avoid further financial loss, Elektra dropped MC5 from their record label.

== Music and lyrics ==
The music on Kick Out the Jams has been described as "raw, in-your-face, savage and raging." According to Classic Rock Magazine, "it’s a devastating introduction to a band who had so much anger and frustration to get out of their system."

"Kick out the jams" has been taken to be a slogan of the 1960s ethos of revolution and liberation, an incitement to "kick out" restrictions in various forms. To quote MC5 guitarist Wayne Kramer from his interview with Caroline Boucher in Disc & Music Echo magazine on August 8, 1970:

People said "oh wow, 'kick out the jams' means break down restrictions" etc., and it made good copy, but when we wrote it we didn't have that in mind. We first used the phrase when we were the house band at a ballroom in Detroit, and we played there every week with another band from the area. ... We got in the habit, being the sort of punks we are, of screaming at them to get off the stage, to kick out the jams, meaning stop jamming. We were saying it all the time and it became a sort of esoteric phrase. Now, I think people can get what they like out of it; that's one of the good things about rock and roll.

== Critical reception ==
Professional ratings
Review scores
Source	Rating
AllMusic	5/5 stars
Chicago Tribune	3.5/4 stars
Classic Rock	9/10
The Encyclopedia of Popular Music	5/5 stars
New Musical Express	9/10
The Rolling Stone Album Guide	3/5 stars
Select	5/5

Upon its release, critic Lester Bangs, writing his inaugural review for Rolling Stone, called Kick Out the Jams a "ridiculous, overbearing, pretentious album". Modern opinion of the album generally holds it in very high regard, noting its influence on rock music that has followed. Mark Deming in a retrospective review for AllMusic called it "one of the most powerfully energetic live albums ever made". PopMatters reviewer Adam Williams wrote, "For my money, 'Kick Out the Jams' is one of the greatest records ever pressed. It is a magnificent time portal into the past, a fleeting glimpse of a band that actually had the balls to walk it like they talked it" and that "no live recording has captured the primal elements of rock more than the MC5's inaugural effort." Bangs himself would change his mind about the album, writing in a footnote in his Troggs essay "James Taylor Marked for Death":

Incidentally, I'm not trying to run down the Five, or write them off as some Troggs trifle. When I reviewed their first album in Rolling Stone, I finished by mentioning "The Troggs, who appeared with a similar sex-and-violence thing a couple of years back, and promptly sank into oblivion, where I imagine they are laughing at the MC5," and that of course is as snottily unkind to the Troggs as to the Five. But then, it was the first review I ever had published, and even if more death threats came in after that review than any other save Jann Wenner's Wheels of Fire massacre (and most of them from sweet home Detroit), I can see why people privileged enough to be part of the apocalyptic birth of the Five would be enraged. And to compound the irony, Kick Out the Jams has been my favorite album or at least one of the two or three most played for about three months now.

== Legacy ==
In March 2005, Q placed the song "Kick Out the Jams" at number 39 in its "100 Greatest Guitar Tracks" list. The same track was named the 65th best hard rock song of all time by VH1.

"The MC5 were a mercurial band," remarked guitarist Wayne Kramer. "We were inconsistent. All of a sudden, this was the night. It was a lot of pressure for us to be under. I hear it every time I listen to the record. I hear me making clumsy mistakes on the guitar; I hear Dennis all over on the tempos; I hear Rob not quite in the perfect voice he was capable of."

Tyler Kane of Paste wrote in 2018: "It might not have been until 1977 when punk rock became somewhat of a household term, but its foundation was set in 1969 with the Motor City Five's roaring arrival, Kick Out the Jams."

Classic Rock wrote in 2021: "While many people would suggest albums from Deep Purple, Thin Lizzy, UFO and others, it’s arguable that Kick Out The Jams is the greatest live album of all time."

In 2024, Ultimate Guitar called the album one of the greatest proto-punk albums. Staff writer Greg Prato wrote: "Few rockers have ever been bold enough to make their major label debut a live recording. But since the MC5 – short for 'Motor City 5' – was one of the most explosive and high-energy live acts of the era, it all made sense, especially after hearing the full-on assault of the album's opening title track from 1969."

== Track listing ==
All tracks are written by MC5 (Rob Tyner, Wayne Kramer, Fred "Sonic" Smith, Michael Davis, Dennis Thompson), except as noted.

Side one
No.	Title	Writer(s)	Length
1.	"Ramblin' Rose"	Fred Burch, Marijohn Wilkin	4:15
2.	"Kick Out the Jams"		2:52
3.	"Come Together"		4:29
4.	"Rocket Reducer No. 62 (Rama Lama Fa Fa Fa)"		5:41
Total length:			17:17

Side two
No.	Title	Writer(s)	Length
5.	"Borderline"		2:45
6.	"Motor City Is Burning"	Al Smith	6:04
7.	"I Want You Right Now"	Colin Frechter, Larry Page	5:31
8.	"Starship"	MC5, Sun Ra	8:15
Total length:			22:35

== Personnel ==
MC5

- Rob Tyner – lead vocals
- Wayne Kramer – lead guitar, backing vocals, lead vocals on "Ramblin' Rose"
- Fred "Sonic" Smith – rhythm guitar, backing vocals
- Michael Davis – bass guitar
- Dennis Thompson – drums

Additional personnel

- Brother J. C. Crawford – "spiritual advisor"
- John Sinclair – "guidance", liner notes
- Bruce Botnick – engineer
- Robert L. Heimall, William S. Harvey – artwork
- Joel Brodsky – album cover photo
- Magdalena Sinclair – liner photography

== Charts ==
Chart performance for Kick Out the Jams
Chart (1969)	Peak position
Canada Top Albums/CDs (RPM)	17
US Billboard 200	30
US Top R&B/Hip-Hop Albums (Billboard)	45

Chart (2015)	Peak position
UK Vinyl Albums (OCC)	32

Chart (2025)	Peak position
Greek Albums (IFPI)	17
