= Rob Tyner =

American musician (1944–1991)

Background information
- Born: Robert Derminer; December 12, 1944; Detroit, Michigan, U.S.
- Died: September 17, 1991 (aged 46) Royal Oak, Michigan, U.S.
- Genres: Proto-punk, hard rock
- Instruments: Vocals; bass guitar; autoharp; harmonica
- Years active: 1963–1991
- Formerly of: MC5

Robert W. Derminer (December 12, 1944 – September 17, 1991), known as Rob Tyner, was an American musician best known as the lead singer for the Detroit proto-punk band MC5. His adopted surname was in tribute to the jazz pianist McCoy Tyner. It was Tyner who issued the rallying cry of "kick out the jams, motherfuckers" at the MC5's live concerts. Tyner had originally auditioned as the bass player, but the band felt his talents would be best used as the lead vocalist.

He is considered by some to be one of the greatest punk rock vocalists of all time.

== Life and career ==
=== Early years ===
Rob Tyner was born on December 12, 1944, in Detroit, Michigan. He was baptized and raised in the Episcopal Church, but often sought ways to incorporate the spirituality from his Native American heritage into the Christian faith of his birth.

=== MC5 ===
Tyner joined the group that was to become MC5 in 1964. He auditioned to be the band's bassist, but soon became its lead vocalist.

MC5 earned national attention with their first album, Kick Out the Jams, recorded live on October 30 and 31, 1968, at Detroit's Grande Ballroom. Critic Mark Deming writes that Kick out the Jams is:

One of the most powerfully energetic live albums ever made ... this is an album that refuses to be played quietly.

The album caused some controversy due to the inflammatory liner notes by the band's manager, John Sinclair, and the title track's rallying cry of "Kick out the jams, motherfuckers!" According to MC5 guitarist Wayne Kramer, the band recorded this as "Kick out the jams, brothers and sisters!" for the single released for radio play; Tyner claimed this was done without group consensus. The edited version also appeared in some LP copies, which also withdrew Sinclair's comments. The album was released in January 1969.

He remained with the band until late 1972, when the MC5 split up.

=== Other works ===
In 1977, Tyner collaborated with Eddie & the Hot Rods for a 7-inch release coinciding with a promotional UK tour to promote MC5 vinyl reissues. Simultaneously back in the US, Tyner had launched "the New MC5" which later operated as the Rob Tyner Band and laid the foundation for "Rob Tyner & the National Rock Group", a project which was prolific but issued no recordings. In 1985, Tyner donated his talents to a benefit LP for Vietnam Veterans.

Tyner dipped into the song catalog of the National Rock Group for his 1990 album Blood Brothers, and plans were in the works to play more live shows, including plans with Blackfoot drummer Jackson Spires, when he died in 1991.

=== Death ===
On September 17, 1991, Tyner suffered a heart attack in the seat of his parked car close to his home town of Berkley, Michigan. He was taken to Beaumont Hospital in Royal Oak, where he died, leaving his wife, Becky, and three children. Tyner is buried at Roseland Park Cemetery in Berkley, Michigan.

== Discography ==
=== MC5 ===
- Kick Out the Jams (1969)
- Back in the USA (1970)
- High Time (1971)

=== Robin Tyner & The Hot Rods ===
- "Till the Night Is Gone (Let's Rock) / Flipside Rock" (1977)

=== Stev Manteiv ===
- Ambush (1985)

=== Solo ===
- Blood Brothers (1990)

=== The Rob Tyner Band ===
- Rock and Roll People (1999)
