= Michael Davis (bassist) =

American musician (1943–2012)

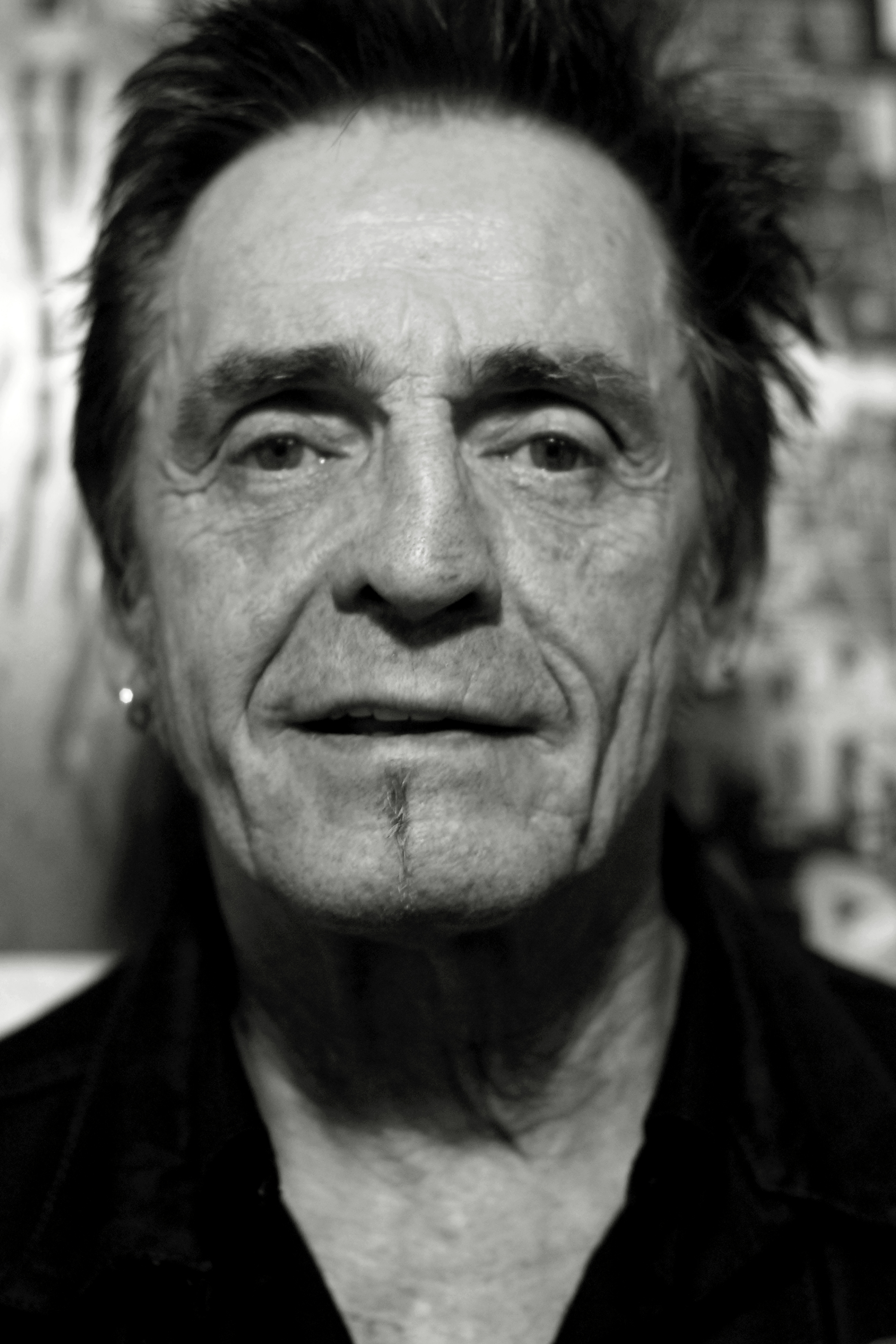
- Davis in 2008

Background information
- Born: June 5, 1943
- Died: February 17, 2012 (aged 68) Chico, California, U.S.
- Genres: Rock
- Occupations: Musician, songwriter, producer
- Formerly of: MC5

Michael Davis (June 5, 1943– February 17, 2012) was an American bass guitarist, singer, songwriter and music producer, best known as a member of the MC5.

== MC5 ==
After dropping out of the fine arts program at Wayne State University, Davis became the bassist for the MC5 in 1964, replacing original bassist Pat Burrows when singer Rob Tyner and guitarist Wayne Kramer decided that they liked Davis's style and wanted him in the band. He played on the band's three original albums, including their debut Kick Out the Jams, and remained in the group until 1972. In 1975–76, Davis spent time in Kentucky's Lexington Federal Prison on a drug charge, where he was unexpectedly reunited with Wayne Kramer.

== Destroy All Monsters ==
Upon his release from prison, Davis joined the Ann Arbor-based proto-punk art noise band Destroy All Monsters at the urging of friend Ron Asheton, of The Stooges.

Davis spent seven years with Destroy All Monsters, penning the underground punk hits "Nobody Knows", "Meet the Creeper", "Little Boyfriend", "Rocking The Cradle" and "Fast City" among others. The band recorded and released on Cherry Red Records, toured the U.K., and then broke up.

== Blood Orange and MC5 reunion ==
After Destroy All Monsters, Davis moved to Tucson, Arizona, where he played in Blood Orange with drummer Cory Barnes. When plans for Blood Orange to depart for a European tour were shelved indefinitely, Davis began playing with Rich Hopkins and Luminarios, the latter taking him back into the studio to record several albums for Germany's Blue Rose Records. In the spring of 2003, Davis reunited with fellow surviving members Wayne Kramer and Dennis Thompson to play a show at London's 100 Club as part of a promotion for an MC5 inspired line of apparel for Levi Strauss Vintage Clothing. This spawned a 200 city world tour and a trip back into the studio to write new songs.

== Music education project ==
Following a serious motorcycle crash on a Los Angeles freeway in May 2006, Davis along with his wife Angela Davis, launched a non-profit organization called The Music Is Revolution Foundation to support music education in public schools.

Volunteers Jake Cavaliere (The Lords of Altamont), Handsome Dick Manitoba (The Dictators), Steve Aoki (Dim Mak Records/Kid Millionaire), Pro-Skater Corey Duffel, Pennywise bassist Randy Bradbury and Obey Giant's Shepard Fairey work alongside Davis to raise funds and public awareness about the ability of music education to increase cognitive ability and test scores, reduce absenteeism and drop-out rates and to inspire a new generation of future voters to learn about other cultures and other times, develop greater understanding of the world around them, and express themselves through music.

== Music producer ==
Davis produced and performed on The Mother's Anger's self-titled debut album. He also produced Dollhouse's debut album, Rock N Soul Circus.

== Art career ==
After the demise of the MC5 in the early 1970s, Davis continued exploration as a visual artist while serving time at the Lexington Federal Correction Institution for a narcotics violation. During this period, he was tasked with creating oversized abstract paintings for permanent display in the prison's Visitor Center and administrative offices. Several years of immersion in life in the desert southwest and world travels with various rock bands left Davis with the inspiration and desire to return to his roots as a painter, studying art along the way at The Armory Center For The Arts in Pasadena, California, the University of Oregon, in Eugene, Oregon, and at Portland Community College in Portland, Oregon, and Butte Community College/California State University, Chico in Chico, California.

In 2006 he collaborated with artist Chris Kro, pro skateboarder Corey Duffel, and Foundation Skateboards to design a commemorative line of skateboard decks and T-shirts.

In 2007, he collaborated with OBEY's Shepard Fairey on a limited line of MC5:OBEY merchandise.

In 2009, his painting "White Panther/Big World" appeared on the Cleopatra Records release MC5: The Very Best of MC5.

In 2011, his painting titled "Black To Comm Sk8r Boys" appeared as the cover art for the Easy Action Records multi-media audio/DVD release from the 2009 sold-out performance by British rock superstars Primal Scream and the reunited surviving members of the MC5 at the Royal Festival Hall. This piece inspired a series of four additional paintings, as well as a run of limited edition prints, all featuring the Sk8tr Boys, this time against iconic Detroit backdrops.

== Death ==
On February 17, 2012, Davis died of liver failure at the age of 68. He was married and had three stepsons, three daughters, and a son.
