= Dennis Thompson (drummer) =

American drummer (1948–2024)

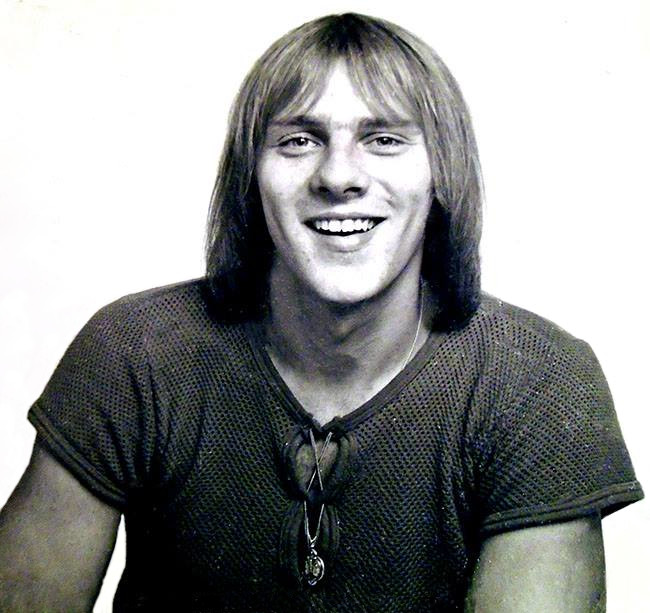

Background information
- Also known as: Machine Gun; MGT
- Born: Dennis Andrew Tomich; September 7, 1948; Detroit, Michigan, U.S.
- Died: May 9, 2024 (aged 75) Taylor, Michigan, U.S.
- Genres: Garage rock; proto-punk; hard rock
- Occupation: Musician
- Instrument: Drums
- Years active: 1963–2024
- Formerly of: MC5; The New Order; New Race

Dennis Thompson (born Dennis Andrew Tomich; September 7, 1948 – May 9, 2024) was an American drummer known for playing with the 1960s–70s Detroit proto-punk/hard rock group MC5, which had a No. 82 US single with "Kick Out the Jams" and a No. 30 US album with the same name.

== Biography ==
Thompson was born Dennis Andrew Tomich in Detroit in 1948. He began playing drums by the time he was nine years old. Joining the MC5 by 1965, Thompson was later given the nickname "Machine Gun" because of his "assault" style of fast, hard-hitting drumming that sonically resembles the sound of his namesake Thompson machine gun (commonly referred to as a "Tommy Gun"). His drumming pre-figured and influenced punk, metal, and hardcore punk drumming styles.

After MC5 broke up in the early 1970s, Thompson was a member of the 1975–1976 Los Angeles–based supergroup The New Order, the 1981 Australia-based supergroup New Race, The Motor City Bad Boys, and The Secrets. In 2001, he guested for Asmodeus X on the song "The Tiger" (St. Thomas Records).

His influences include Elvin Jones, Keith Moon and Mitch Mitchell, and Motown. In 2015, he described how his drumming technique had changed considerably over time, playing with "much less force and tucked in elbows, more wrist action and less arm action".

Thompson was in the band DKT/MC5 with the surviving members of MC5, from 2003 to 2012. Later, he recorded two tracks for a new MC5 album scheduled for October 2022 release. Later titled Heavy Lifting, it was released in October 2024.

== Death ==
Thompson suffered a heart attack in April 2024, and died in Taylor, Michigan, on May 9, at the age of 75. He was the final surviving member of the original MC5 line-up.
