= Goose Lake International Music Festival =

1970 multiday rock event in Michigan, US

- Promotional poster for the Goose Lake International Music Festival
- Genre: Rock music
- Dates: August 7–9, 1970
- Location: Leoni Township, Michigan
- Years active: 1970
- Founders: Richard Songer, Russ Gibb, Tom Wright
- Attendance: 200,000
- Capacity: 60,000

The Goose Lake International Music Festival held August 7–9, 1970, in Leoni Township, Michigan, "was one of the largest music events of its era", and featured many of the top rock music bands of the period.

== History ==
=== Facilities and planning ===
The festival took place nearly one year after Woodstock, and the Goose Lake promoters set out to create a better planned event with better facilities for rock fans than Woodstock. The lead promoter was Richard Songer, a wealthy 35-year-old man who had been successful in the construction business. Songer teamed up with experienced Detroit disc jockey and promoter, Russ Gibb, and his associate, Tom Wright, to help plan the festival.

Goose Lake Park was built on 390 acres of land, with a budget of $1 million, and was billed as the "world's first permanent festival site". It was projected that 60,000 fans would attend the first festival.

The stage was built on a large, revolving turntable with two performance spaces so that the previous band could disassemble its gear and the next band set up while the current band was performing. At the end of each performance, the stage would rotate 180 degrees, and the next act would begin performing almost immediately. The backstage area had a tent where 20 to 30 groupies described as "sizzlers" were available for the performers.

Those who attended were provided free campsites, free parking and free firewood. There were restrooms and showers every 500 feet, medical staff, motorcycle and dune buggy trails, a lake with a beach, and also the "longest slide in the world". To keep gate crashers out, the site was surrounded by a high chain-link fence topped by barbed wire.

The admission price for the three-day event was $15.00, and entry tokens in the style of poker chips were sold to avoid the counterfeiting of paper tickets.

Before the festival, concerned local officials sought a temporary restraining order to prevent the event, but a judge denied the request. Many Canadian rock fans were turned back at border crossings and were unable to attend.

=== Performers ===
National and international acts performing at the festival included Faces featuring Rod Stewart, Jethro Tull, Chicago, Ten Years After, The Flying Burrito Brothers, Mountain, John Sebastian, the James Gang featuring Joe Walsh, The Flock and The Litter.

Notable Detroit area bands performing included Bob Seger, the MC5, The Stooges, Detroit featuring Mitch Ryder, Brownsville Station, Savage Grace, Third Power and SRC. Masters of ceremonies were Teegarden & Van Winkle, who also performed.

Savoy Brown, Joe Cocker and Alice Cooper were announced acts that did not perform due to contractual problems.

=== The festival ===
An estimated 200,000 rock music fans attended the festival. The initial attitude of the "young, hip police force" toward the fans in attendance was to "leave them alone", at least when they were inside the festival grounds. The festival was known for widespread, openly visible drug sales and public nudity.

John Laycock of the Windsor Star praised the festival, writing that "The Organization Men of Goose Lake have resurrected the spirit of Woodstock without the discomforts" and that "the giant amphitheatre was superbly equipped." Laycock mentioned the performances of Frost, Savage Grace, Chicago, The Flock, Jethro Tull, John Sebastian, Faces, Ten Years After, Mountain and The Flying Burrito Brothers as particularly memorable. Tom Wright, who was responsible for staging and logistics at the festival, including design of the revolving stage, reported that it had gone off "virtually hitch free".

The rotating stage was a success. Record store owner Dave Bernath remembered, "The band would literally hit their last note, say 'thank you' and 'goodbye,' they spun around and the next band started within a minute—in seconds! The first band was still fading out when the other band came on! That's the way it should be!"

Despite some problems, "most fans and musicians recall a sunny attitude surrounding the weekend". Rod Stewart enjoyed his Friday night performance so much that he stayed to watch Alvin Lee perform with Ten Years After the following night.

The participation of the White Panther Party and the affiliated Serve the People (STP) Coalition added some "street credibility" to the event. The festival took place at the time of the 25th anniversary of the atomic bombings of Hiroshima and Nagasaki, and peace groups publicized an anti-nuclear weapons message during the event.

Detroit rock historian David A. Carson wrote that "drugs took center stage" at Goose Lake, and that the park was "reminiscent of Attica" because of the barbed wire topped perimeter fence. There was a report of a rape by a group of bikers while The Stooges were performing.

=== Aftermath ===
There were 160 arrests of those leaving after the event, mostly on drug charges. Jackson County sheriff Charles Southworth estimated that "75% of the youths were on drugs".

Extensive newspaper coverage concentrated on the open drug sales and use at the festival. Michigan governor William Milliken denounced the "deplorable and open sale and use of drugs" at the festival, and called for investigation and prosecution of the "drug pushers" who were present. Michigan attorney general Frank J. Kelley said "I think we have seen the first and last rock concert of that size in Michigan".

Promoter Richard Songer was indicted for promoting the sale of drugs. He was acquitted in December 1971. The district attorney obtained an injunction barring any other public shows at the park. No further rock festivals took place at Goose Lake.

The site of the Goose Lake Festival is now the Greenwood Acres Family Campground.

== See also ==
- List of historic rock festivals
- List of jam band music festivals
