= Midsummer Rock =

- Genre: Concert
- Starring: The Stooges; Mountain; Grand Funk Railroad; Traffic; Alice Cooper
- Narrated by: Jack Lescoulie; Bob Waller

Production
- Production locations: Crosley Field, Cincinnati, Ohio, USA
- Camera setup: Multicam
- Running time: 90 minutes

Midsummer Rock is a television program based on the 1970 Cincinnati Summer Pop Festival. The 90-minute TV version featured Alice Cooper, Mountain, Grand Funk Railroad, The Stooges, and Traffic.

== History ==
A rather thorough history of the 1970 Cincinnati Summer Pop Festival that spawned the Midsummer Rock TV show is available on the Cincinnati CityBeat website. Inspired by the success of their previous festival, the 1970 Cincinnati Pop Festival (held March 26, 1970) Detroit area rock promoters Michael Quatro and Russ Gibb decided to organize the 1970 Cincinnati Summer Pop Festival. The festival took place and was filmed on June 13, 1970 at Crosley Field in Cincinnati, Ohio, the home of the Cincinnati Reds baseball team since 1912. The Reds only had a couple more games to play there before moving to Riverfront Stadium downtown that summer. It was broadcast nationally in August of that year but edited down to 90 minutes, including commercials with 5 five acts being The Stooges, Alice Cooper, Traffic, Mountain, and Grand Funk Railroad. It was never rebroadcast. The video features now legendary performances by the Stooges, including stage diving and the peanut butter incident by Iggy, and a psychedelic-era Alice Cooper, where Alice received a cream pie in the face while he was attempting to hypnotize the audience. Poor quality videos of a couple of the acts have been available for years on YouTube, specifically the Stooges, Alice Cooper and Mountain. It was produced through the facilities of WLWT-TV, which was owned by Avco-Embassy group. In most cities broadcasting it, including Cincinnati, the audio was simulcast in stereo by FM stations.

== Festival line-up ==
- The Stooges
- Mountain
- Grand Funk Railroad
- Alice Cooper
- Traffic
- Bob Seger System
- Mott the Hoople
- Ten Years After
- Bloodrock
- Savage Grace
- Zephyr
- Cradle
- Brownsville Station (cancelled)
- Mike Quatro Jam Band (cancelled)
- Third Power (cancelled)
- Sky (cancelled)
- Mighty Quick
- Damnation of Adam Blessing
- John Drakes Shakedown
