= Back Porch Video =

- Created by: Russ Gibb

Original release
- Release: January 28, 1984

Back Porch Video is a local cable television-based music video program in Dearborn, Michigan, United States. It premiered on January 28, 1984 and was created with Russ Gibb, former owner of the Grande Ballroom in Detroit, Michigan.

The program was broadcast from Westinghouse Broadcasting's Group W Cable studios in Dearborn, and stayed on the air for around 16 years. Initially airing from 10 p.m. – 1 a.m. on Saturday nights, the show expanded to 9 p.m. – 1 a.m. after about one year. The program saw a short run of three programs broadcast nationwide on Detroit's PBS station WTVS Channel 56.

In 1985, Back Porch Video won a CableACE Award.
