= Ann Arbor Sun =

Defunct Michigan newspaper

- Cover of the first Ann Arbor Sun.
- Type: biweekly underground newspaper
- Founder(s): John Sinclair, Leni Sinclair Gary Grimshaw
- Publisher: The Rainbow People's Party
- Founded: April 30, 1971
- Ceased publication: October 15, 1976
- Language: English
- City: Ann Arbor, Michigan
- Country: United States
- OCLC number: 1640866
- Free online archives: voices.revealdigital.org (Sun) voices.revealdigital.org (Ann Arbor Sun)

The Ann Arbor Sun was a biweekly underground newspaper founded by John Sinclair in April 1967. The newspaper was originally called the Warren-Forest Sun (the name refers to the neighborhood in Detroit between Warren Avenue and Forest Avenue) before it was changed to the Ann Arbor Sun in 1968 when Trans-Love Energies moved to Ann Arbor.

The organization, founded by John Sinclair, his wife Leni Sinclair and artist Gary Grimshaw in 1967, set up shop in two big communal houses at 1510 and 1520 Hill St, where the Ann Arbor Sun was produced and edited by the members of the group. Early issues of the paper were printed with the silk screen and mimeograph equipment of the Artists Workshop Press, which Sinclair brought with him from Detroit to Ann Arbor.

On July 28, 1969, the Ann Arbor Sun printed a revised copy of the White Panther Party's ten-point program. The newspaper was considered to be the mouthpiece for the party for quite some time before the newspaper transitioned to an independent publication spreading views on local issues, left-wing politics, music, and arts. Finally in 1976, the publication of the Ann Arbor Sun was suspended indefinitely.

== See also ==
- List of underground newspapers of the 1960s counterculture
