= Russ Gibb =

American music promoter (1931–2019)

- Born: Russel James Gibb; June 15, 1931
- Died: April 30, 2019 (aged 87)
- Other name: Uncle Russ
- Education: Fordson High School; Michigan State University
- Occupations: Rock concert promoter; public school teacher; disc jockey
- Years active: 1961–2004
- Known for: Proprietor of the Grande Ballroom; producer of Back Porch Video; popularizing "Paul is dead" conspiracy theory
- Parents: James Hutton Gibb; Jessie Gibb
- Website: http://russgibbatrandom.com/ (defunct)

Russel James Gibb (June 15, 1931 – April 30, 2019) was an American rock concert promoter, school teacher, and disc jockey from Dearborn, Michigan. He is best known for his role in the "Paul is dead" urban legend, which he discussed on radio station WKNR-FM in Dearborn, propelling the underground conspiracy into a global phenomenon. He is also known as the owner of the Grande Ballroom, a major rock music venue in Detroit.

== Early life and education ==
Gibb was born in Dearborn. An alumnus of Fordson High School, he later graduated from Michigan State University, earning a degree in educational radio and television administration in 1953.

== Career ==
=== Teaching ===
Gibb began teaching elementary school English in the Dearborn School District in 1961. In 1976, he began teaching TV and video production at Dearborn High School. He retired in 2004, having spent 42 years teaching in the Dearborn public schools. For 16 years, he produced the student run cable video show Back Porch Video.

In 1969, to facilitate better understanding of students by schools and educators, Gibb went undercover as a transfer student in several Detroit area high schools, including Farmington High School and Cooley High School. He concluded that the students "...weren't being treated like people; study hall was like prison." He said, "I also saw that there was a lot of intelligence in the students I met. This turned me on to try and get closer to them, and music was a good way to do it."

=== Disc jockey ===
Gibb started his broadcast career as a weekend TV floor manager at WWJ-TV in Detroit. He did some weekend disc jockey work for WBRB in Mount Clemens, Michigan. Then, he worked at WKMH.

Gibb worked as a disk jockey at WKNR-FM, when the station was transitioning from a Top 40 format to a hard rock format. His on air nickname was "Uncle Russ". On October 12, 1969, a caller to his show told Gibb about the "Paul is dead" rumor and its clues. The rumor had been circulating sporadically for two years, but had not yet attracted much attention. Gibb and other callers discussed the rumor on the air for the next hour. Two days after the WKNR broadcast, The Michigan Daily published a satirical review of Abbey Road by University of Michigan student Fred LaBour under the headline "McCartney Dead; New Evidence Brought to Light". It identified various clues to McCartney's death on Beatles album covers, including new clues from the just-released Abbey Road LP. As LaBour had invented many of the clues, he was astonished when the story was picked up by newspapers across the United States.

Gibb further fueled the rumor with a special two-hour program on the subject, "The Beatle Plot", which aired on October 19, 1969. This show has been called "infamous", a "fraud" and a "mockumentary". It brought enormous worldwide publicity to Gibb and WKNR.

=== Rock music promoter ===
In the early 1960s, Gibb supplemented his teaching income by producing weekend sock hops at a rented union hall under the name the Pink Pussycat.

In 1966, Gibb opened the Grande Ballroom in Detroit, and was a major player in the late 1960s and early 1970s Detroit music scene. He hired psychedelic poster artists Gary Grimshaw and Carl Lundgren to help promote his shows. Most major rock acts of that era performed at the Grande Ballroom, some many times. He closed the Grande Ballroom in 1972. He was instrumental in giving the MC5, Ted Nugent and Iggy Pop their start. The Grande Ballroom also was where The Who played their rock opera, Tommy, for the first time in the United States. Gibb also owned and leased other live music venues around the Midwest including the Eastown Theatre, Michigan Theater (where the New York Dolls played), and the Birmingham Palladium. He invested in the rock magazine Creem in 1969.

Gibb was one of the promoters of the Goose Lake International Music Festival in 1970, which attracted a crowd of 200,000 people. Gibb and Mike Quatro co-promoted the 1970 Cincinnati Pop Festival and the 1970 Cincinnati Summer Pop Festival, attracting 11,500 and 24,000 people, respectively.The 1970 Cincinnati Summer Pop Festival was also broadcast on television as "Midsummer Rock."

=== Cable TV investor ===
In 1970, Gibb traveled to England and spent some time staying with Mick Jagger. He was impressed with Jagger's advanced home video system. This led to his interest in cable TV. Gibb bought the Dearborn, Michigan; Wayne, Michigan; and Grosse Pointe, Michigan cable licenses in the late 1970s. When he sold his interests in the 1980s, he became a millionaire.

=== Other ventures ===
During the administration of Gerald Ford, Gibb worked on the United States Bicentennial Commission as the National Director of Youth and Education. In addition to Back Porch Video, he also hosted his own TV show, Russ Gibb at Random, starting around 1990.

== Later life and death ==
Prior to retirement from teaching, Gibb maintained a blog version of Russ Gibb at Random, posting at irregular intervals from December 2001 until August 25, 2016.

Gibb suffered from poor health in his final years, and died of congestive heart failure at the age of 87 on April 30, 2019.

== Bibliography ==
- Andru J. Reeve. Turn Me On, Dead Man (2004) ISBN 1-4184-8294-3
- David A. Carson. Grit, Noise, and Revolution: The Birth of Detroit Rock 'n' Roll (2006) ISBN 0-472-03190-2
- Tom Wright. Roadwork: Rock and Roll Turned Inside Out (2007) ISBN 1423413008
