= John Sinclair (poet) =

American poet and activist (1941–2024)

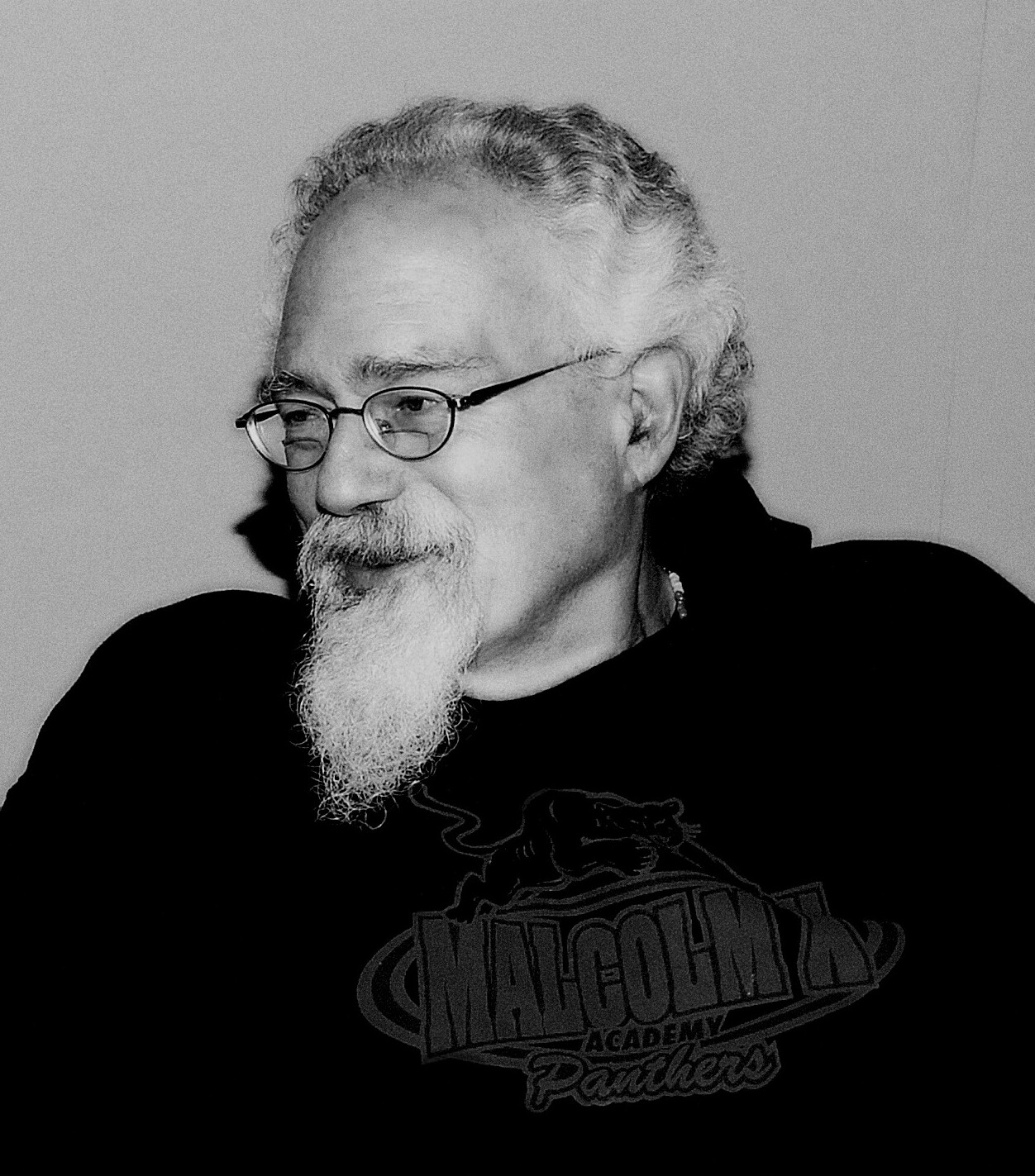
- Sinclair in 2008
- Born: John Alexander Sinclair Jr. October 2, 1941; Flint, Michigan, U.S.
- Died: April 2, 2024 (aged 82); Detroit, Michigan, U.S.
- Education: University of Michigan–Flint
- Occupations: Poet; writer; talent manager; political activist

John Alexander Sinclair Jr. (October 2, 1941 – April 2, 2024) was an American poet, writer, and political activist from Flint, Michigan. Sinclair's defining style is jazz poetry, and he released most of his works in audio formats. Most of his pieces include musical accompaniment, usually by a varying group of collaborators dubbed Blues Scholars.

As an emerging young poet in the mid-1960s, Sinclair took on the role of manager for the Detroit rock band MC5. The band's politically charged music and its Yippie core audience dovetailed with Sinclair's own radical development. In 1968, while still working with the band, he conspicuously served as a founding member of the White Panther Party, a militantly anti-racist socialist group and counterpart of the Black Panther Party. Arrested for distribution of marijuana in 1969, Sinclair was given ten years in prison. The sentence was criticized by many as unduly harsh, and it galvanized a noisy protest movement led by prominent figures of the 1960s counterculture. He was freed on March 9, 1972, by the Michigan Supreme Court when the possession of marijuana law was declared unconstitutional. (Note: The case involved entrapment, search and seizure, due process of law and equal protection issues.)

He was indicted for an alleged terrorist bombing of a covert CIA office. That matter involved substantial litigation – his case against the government for illegal domestic surveillance was successfully pleaded to the US Supreme Court in United States v. U.S. District Court (1972). It took the form of a Writ of Mandamus, which was won at the United States Court of Appeals for the Sixth Circuit and an appeal on certiorari to the Supreme Court. The wiretap evidence was suppressed, and the criminal case dropped.

Sinclair eventually left the US and took up residency in Amsterdam. He continued to write and record and, from 2005, hosted a regular radio program, The John Sinclair Radio Show, as well as producing a line-up of other shows on his own radio station, Radio Free Amsterdam.

Sinclair was among the first people to purchase recreational marijuana when it became legal in Michigan on December 1, 2019.

== Early life and education ==
John Alexander Sinclair Jr. was born in Flint, Michigan, on October 2, 1941, and grew up in Davison. He was a member of the Class of 1960 at Albion College in Albion, Michigan, but he dropped out after his first year. Sinclair subsequently attended the Flint College of the University of Michigan, now the University of Michigan-Flint. During his time at UM-Flint he served on the university's Publications Board, school newspaper The Word, and was the president of the Cinema Guild. He graduated in 1964.

== 1960s activism ==
Sinclair was music editor and columnist for the Detroit underground newspaper, Fifth Estate, during the paper's growth in the late 1960s. Fifth Estate continues to publish to this day, making it one of the longest continuously published alternative periodicals in the United States. In an era before the internet, he was an influential publisher, columnist and editor of counter cultural newspapers and other documents, some of which still survive.

Sinclair also contributed to the formation of Detroit Artists Workshop Press, which published five issues of Work Magazine. Sinclair worked as a jazz writer for DownBeat from 1964 to 1965, being an outspoken advocate for the newly emerging Free Jazz Avant Garde movement. Sinclair was one of the "New Poets" who read at the seminal Berkeley Poetry Conference in July 1965.

In April 1967, he founded the Ann Arbor Sun, a biweekly underground newspaper, with his wife Leni Sinclair and artist Gary Grimshaw.

He was front and center on the issue of legalization of cannabis, and promoted its benefits while decrying its illegality. He was there to prominently buy legal cannabis when it became legal in Michigan. Magdalen "Leni" Sinclair is credited as an unsung hero of the fight for legalization—she took over for John during his two years in prison.

The argument for legalization was summed up in a 2011 Sinclair interview, which highlighted the original goal of Hash Bash was total legalization. He said:

"They need to get rid of this idiotic, hypocritical war on drugs. Marijuana, there's nothing wrong with it," he said. "It doesn't harm anybody, it's not a dangerous substance, and millions of people use it—and they're just characterized as criminals by these people whose drug of choice is alcohol. So the first thing you get rid of is tremendous hypocrisy."

Sinclair and Pun Plamondon established a commune at 1510 Hill Street. They founded the White Panther Party, which supported the goals of the Black Panther Party. He was indicted for bombing a CIA office in Ann Arbor, Michigan, on September 29, 1968.

Sinclair was somewhat dismissive of the fact that he was imprisoned — something like, 'it comes with the job.'

During the 1960s, the White Panther Party, the precursor to the Rainbow People's Party, billed itself as an "anti racist political collective." They hosted free live concerts in Ann Arbor's West Park, until city council ended them. While Sinclair ventured the opinion that LSD was the catalyst that would bring the downfall of Western civilization. Some donned long guns and ammunition belts for photo opportunities and target practice. Some claim that was as aggressive as they became. "One member of the Black Panthers reportedly dismissed the dope-smoking Panthers from Michigan as 'psychedelic clowns.'" However, the dramatic poseurs got the attention of civil authorities. who called "the Panthers "potentially the largest and most dangerous of revolutionary organizations in the United States.""

"Everybody was on acid at West Park. We just had a ball at that motherf*****," he once recalled, noting they called themselves "acid freeks," spelled with two Es like "free."

== Involvement with the MC5 ==
Sinclair managed the proto-punk band MC5 from 1966 through 1969. Under his guidance the band embraced the counter-culture revolutionary politics of the White Panther Party, founded in answer to the Black Panthers' call for white people to support their movement.

The album Kick Out the Jams caused some controversy due to John Sinclair's inflammatory liner notes and the title track's rallying cry of "Kick out the jams, motherfuckers!" According to Wayne Kramer the band recorded this as "Kick out the jams, brothers and sisters!" for the single released for radio play; Rob Tyner claimed this was done without group consensus. The edited version also appeared in some LP copies, which also withdrew Sinclair's excitable comments. The album was released in January 1969; reviews were mixed, but the album was relatively successful, quickly selling over 100,000 copies and peaking at #30 on the Billboard 200 chart in May 1969 during a 23-week stay.

During this period, Sinclair booked "The Five" as the regular house band at Detroit's famed Grande Ballroom in what came to be known as the "Kick out the Jams" shows. He was managing the MC5 at the time of their free concert outside the 1968 Democratic National Convention in Chicago. The band was the only group to perform before police broke up the massive anti-Vietnam war rally. Eventually, the MC5 came to find Sinclair's politics too heavy-handed. He and the band separated in 1969. In 2006, Sinclair joined MC5 bassist Michael Davis to launch the Music Is Revolution Foundation, serving as a general board member. They issued a CD, Music is Revolution: From the John & Leni Sinclair library with Leni Sinclair. Oak Park, MI: Book Beat Gallery, 2000, a spoken word CD (compiled from 50 hours of historical recordings at the Bentley Historical Library, plus an illustrated book featuring posters and pictures of the MC5, an documenting radical political history.

The band and Sinclair lived together in a commune on Hill Street in Ann Arbor for several years. Marijuana and hallucogenics were commonly used.

He was said to be charismatic and theatrical. As the Detroit Free Press wrote: "Gleefully proclaiming the joys of rock 'n' roll, drugs and sex in the streets, John Sinclair reigned as a nationally celebrated troubadour of youth rebellion during the psychedelic era, playing a lead role in making Detroit and Ann Arbor counterculture hot spots with the MC5 band, the White Panther Party, cutting-edge concerts and flamboyant rhetoric." He proselytized a "utopian dream of a post-industrial society based on leisure and marijuana never went beyond a small group of collaborators.-" seeing to "to mount a "total assault" on the "death culture" of America." He proclaimed the "pig-death machine" to be "anti-life by definition." Sinclair was unapologetic, although he later acknowledged his hippie driven utopia was a "naïve fantasy."

While managing the MC5 and leading the White Panthers he was able to build the Detroit's Grande Ballroom into a Midwestern concert venue. He was an influence of Iggy Pop's career. Iggy Pop started as the flamboyant lead singer of the Psychedelic Stooges. Meanwhile, Sinclair spread his rebellious gospel, making appearances at high schools and other venues.

In Guitar World Sinclair proclaimed that it was "the crazed guerilla warfare we were waging with the MC5." His death came only two months after MC5 co-founder Wayne Kramer's death.

== Imprisonment and public support ==
After a series of convictions for delivery (Note: He was the subject of "dozens" of articles in the Detroit Free Press.) of marijuana (Note: "The Detroit police narcotics squad busted Sinclair for marijuana three times in less than three years, once sending more than two dozen cops to raid an apartment filled with stoned hippies listening to John Coltrane's "A Love Supreme." After his second arrest he served six months in the old Detroit House of Correction. It was the third arrest, in December 1966, that led to Sinclair going to prison in 1969. His crime: giving―free of charge―two joints to an undercover Detroit policewoman.) Sinclair was sentenced to 9 1/2 to 10 years in prison in 1969 after offering two joints to an undercover female narcotics officer. The final charge was possession of marijuana, The severity of his sentence sparked high-profile protests, including an infamous incident at the 1969 Woodstock Festival wherein Yippie activist Abbie Hoffman jumped on the stage and seized a microphone during a performance by The Who. Hoffman managed to shout only a few words about Sinclair's plight before he was forcibly ejected from the stage by guitarist Pete Townshend.

Various public and private protests culminated in the "John Sinclair Freedom Rally" at Ann Arbor's Crisler Arena in December 1971. The event, which drew 15,000 attendees, brought together celebrities including Lennon and Yoko Ono; musicians David Peel, Stevie Wonder, Phil Ochs and Bob Seger, Archie Shepp and Roswell Rudd; poets Allen Ginsberg and Ed Sanders; and countercultural speakers including Abbie Hoffman, Rennie Davis, David Dellinger, Jerry Rubin, and Bobby Seale. Three days after the rally, having served 29 months, Sinclair was released from prison when the Michigan Supreme Court ruled that the state's marijuana statutes were unconstitutional. These events inspired the creation of Ann Arbor's annual pro-legalization Hash Bash rally.

At the Freedom Rally, Lennon performed his new song "John Sinclair", which he recorded for his next album, Some Time in New York City (1972), though by that time Sinclair had been released. With "directness and simplicity", said one critic, the lyrics lament Sinclair's intended harsh punishment: "They gave him ten for two—what else can the bastards do?"

In 1972, Leonard Weinglass took on the federal defense of Sinclair in Detroit, Michigan after he was charged with conspiracy to destroy government property along with Larry 'Pun' Plamondon and John Forrest. They had been targeted by the Nixon administration as part of Operation COINTELPRO. They allegedly bombed a CIA office in Ann Arbor. While awaiting trial and after being convicted, the government admitted to wiretapping without a warrant. The case went to the United States Supreme Court and was decided in United States v. U.S. District Court, also now famously known as the Keith Case, which held that not even the invocation of "national security" by the president of the United States could insulate illegal activity from Constitutional rights to privacy (407 U.S. 297 (1972)). The charges were dismissed. (Note: Plamundon's "Supreme Court challenge stopped the Nixon Administration from wiretapping domestic dissidents without a warrant. ... he [was] President Pro Tem of CURR, the Congress of Unrepentant Radicals.")

== Hash Bash ==
In 1972, Ann Arbor's annual marijuana celebration and toke and smoke fest in the Diag (the central part of the main campus) began. This was four months after the John Sinclair Freedom Rally, who was at the time still serving time on his ten year sentence for possession of two joints. John Lennon appeared at that rally and penned a song.

Sinclair was present for the 2023 Hash Bash.

Sinclair died four days before a scheduled appearance at hash bash. It is slated as a Sinclair memorial:

"This Hash Bash is the John Sinclair memorial Hash Bash and we will carry on in his name until we win complete freedom for cannabis," said Ann Arbor activist Chuck Ream, calling it absurd that pot is still illegal at the federal level.

== Writing, performances, and poetry ==
Starting in the mid-1980s, Sinclair wrote a newspaper column on cannabis, titled "Free the Weed". The primary focus of Sinclair's column was the social history of cannabis use in the US; however, he often touched upon the global campaign for its legalisation.

From the mid-1990s, Sinclair performed and recorded his spoken word pieces with his band The Blues Scholars, which included such musicians as Wayne Kramer, Brock Avery, Charles Moore, Doug Lunn, and Paul Ill, among many others. He also performed as a distinctive disc jockey for New Orleans' WWOZ Radio, the public jazz and heritage station.

On March 22, 2006, Sinclair joined The Black Crowes on stage at the Paradiso in Amsterdam, and read his poem "Monk in Orbit" during the instrumental break in the song "Nonfiction". Two days later, he went back onstage at the Black Crowes show in the Paradiso, reading his poem "Fat Boy" during the long instrumental jam following the Black Crowes' song, "How Much for Your Wings?".

On January 20, 2009, to mark Barack Obama's inauguration as the 44th President of the United States, Sinclair performed a series of his poems accompanied by a live band, featuring Elliott Levin, Tony Bianco and Jair-Rohm Parker Wells at Cafe OTO in Dalston, East London.

In 2011, Sinclair recorded spoken-word for the intro to the song "Best Lasts Forever" by Scottish band The View, produced by Youth.

In 2023, Sinclair did a eulogy at the tribute for Pun Plamondon, with whom he helped found the White Panthers party. Sinclair said, "He was a brilliant character," but went on at such length about his own contribution— so much so that he was interrupted and reminded that "this is about Pun."

Sinclair made a career of being a poet and promoter. He also promoted concerts and festivals and helped to establish The Detroit Artists Workshop and Detroit Jazz Center were among his promoted events, as were other concerts and festivals. At Wayne State University he taught Blues history and hosted radio programs in Detroit WDET, New Orleans and Amsterdam. He authored liner notes for albums of Harold Melvin & The Blue Notes and The Isley Brothers.

== The John Sinclair Foundation ==
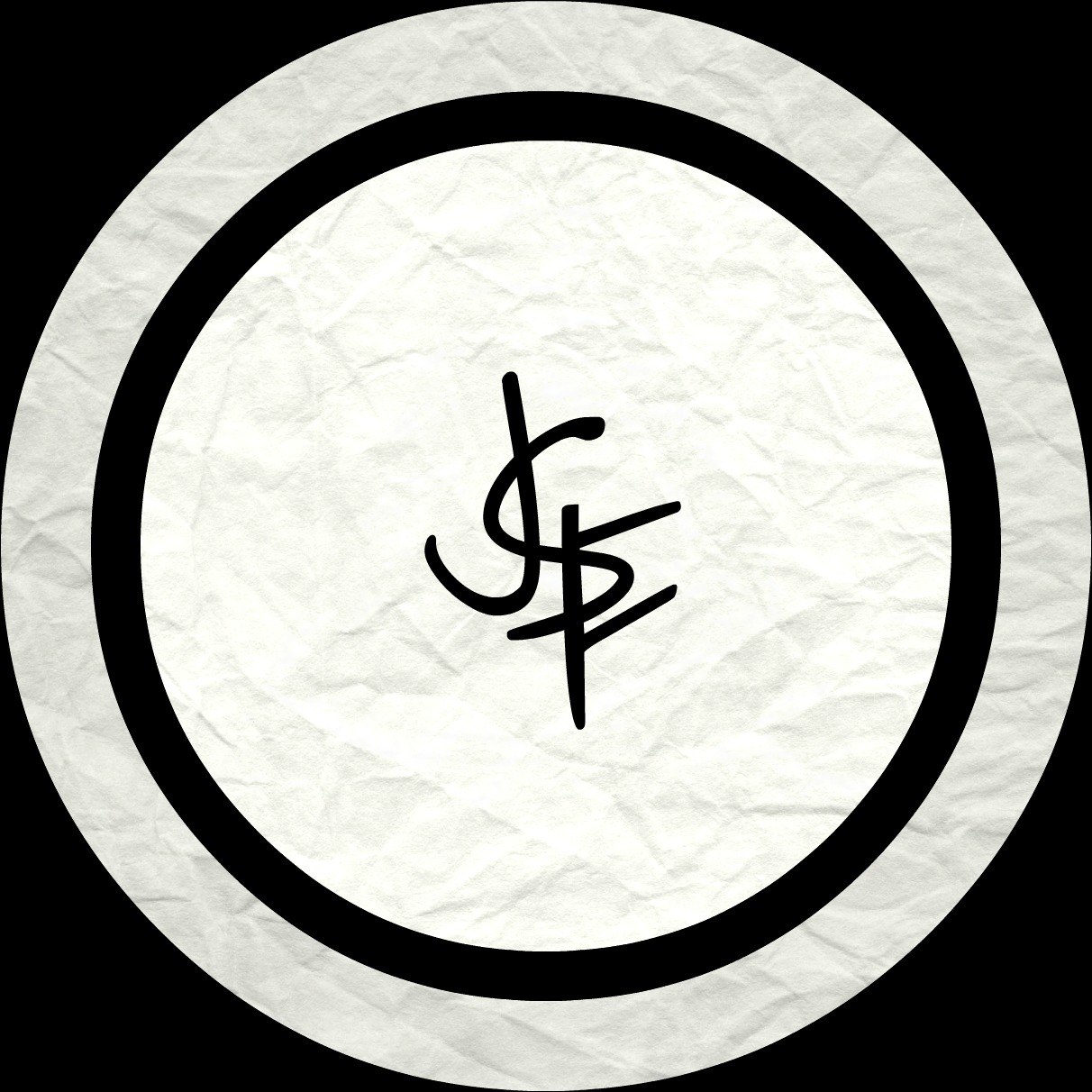
Logo for the John Sinclair Foundation

Created in 2004, The John Sinclair Foundation is a non-profit organization based in Amsterdam, Netherlands. Its mission is to ensure the preservation and proper presentation of the creative works via poetry, music, performance, journalism, editing and publishing, broadcast and record production of Sinclair. To date, the foundation has produced books, zines, records, and documentaries highlighting his contribution to the historic cannabis legalization effort, rock music in Detroit and psychedelic communitarianism.

== Personal life and death ==
Sinclair was married twice. His marriage to Magdalene (Leni) Sinclair ended in divorce in 1988, after a legal separation in 1977. The marriage produced two daughters, Marion "Sunny" and Celia. in 1967 and 1970. Near the end of his life, his daughters were caretakers during his final illness. His second wife was Patricia (Penny) Brown, who he married in 1989.

Per the Detroit Metro Times, Sinclair died of heart failure, the official cause of death, at the Detroit Receiving Hospital, on April 2, 2024, at the age of 82. Hash Bash organizer Jamie Lowell related: ""He's a tough dude, but he has been physically up and down for the last few years for different reasons — he's had diabetes, he's taken some falls, he's had heart surgery," Lowell said" He had been plagued by diabetes and had an open leg sore that became infected with sepsis.

A memorial service at the Museum of Contemporary Art Detroit (MOCAD) and reception at another location were celebrated on April 9, 2024.

His papers are at the Bentley Historical Library, which is part of the University of Michigan.

== Discography ==
John Sinclair has recorded several of his poems and essays. On these albums blues and jazz musicians provide psychedelic soundscapes to accompany his delivery:

=== John Sinclair ===
- Thelonious Volume 1: A Book of Monk (1996) Blue Notes, Alive Records, New Alliance
- Underground Issues (2000)
- Der Pfähler (2005) Verlagsgr
- It's All Good (2005)
- No Money Down: Greatest Hits, Volume 1 (2005)
- Fattening Frogs For Snakes, Volume Two: Country Blues (2005) Okra-Tone
- Country Blues (2005) No Cover Productions
- Guitar Army (2007)
- It's All Good: A John Sinclair Reader (2010)
- Song of Praise — Homage to John Coltrane (2011)
- Beatnik Youth (2012) Iron Man
- Conspiracy Theory (2012)
- Viperism (2012)
- Fattening Frogs For Snakes, Volume Four: Natural From Our Hearts
- Mohawk (2014) Iron Man
- Beatnik Youth Ambient (2017
- Mobile Homeland (2017)
- Beatnik Youth (2017)

=== John Sinclair & His Blues Scholars ===
- Full Moon Night (1994)
- Total Energy (1995)
- Full Circle (1997) Alive Records
- White Buffalo Prayer (2000)
- Fattening Frogs For Snakes, Volume Three: Don't Start Me To Talking (2009)

=== John Sinclair & Ed Moss with The Society Jazz Orchestra ===
- If I Could Be With You (1996)

=== John Sinclair & His Boston Blues Scholars ===
- If I Could Be With You (1996)
- Steady Rollin' Man Live (2001) TriPup Records
- Fattening Frogs For Snakes, Volume One: The Delta Sound (2002)
- KnockOut (2002)

=== John Sinclair & Monster Island ===
- PeyoteMind (2002). Sinclair's reflections, inspired by a peyote trip he had in 1963, are set to music by Cary Loren for Monster Island.

=== John Sinclair & Mark Ritsema ===
- Criss Cross (2007) Big Chief

=== John Sinclair & Pinkeye ===
- Tearing Down the Shrine of Truth & Beauty (2008)

=== John Sinclair & His Motor City Blues Scholars ===
- Detroit Life (2008) CD Baby

=== John Sinclair & Planet D Nonet ===
- Viper Madness (2010) No Cover Productions

=== John Sinclair & His International Blues Scholars ===
- Let's Go Get 'Em (2011)
- Live at the Scarab Club Presents: Monk's Dream Eld

=== John Sinclair & Hollow Bones ===
- Honoring The Local Gods (2011) Straw2Gold
- Die Nacht des Schwarzen Drachen
