= Gary Grimshaw =

American graphic artist (1946–2014)

- Gary Grimshaw in 1973
- Born: February 25, 1946; Detroit, Michigan U.S.
- Died: January 13, 2014 (aged 67); Detroit, Michigan
- Known for: Graphic design, Illustrator
- Movement: Poster art

Gary Grimshaw (February 25, 1946 – January 13, 2014) was an American graphic artist active in Detroit and San Francisco who specialized in designing rock concert posters. He was also a radical political activist with the White Panther Party and related organizations.

== Early years ==
Grimshaw was born on February 25, 1946, in Detroit, and raised in Lincoln Park, Michigan. His best friend in high school was Rob Derminer, later known as Rob Tyner, lead singer of the Detroit protopunk band, the MC5. Another friend from his youth in Lincoln Park was Wayne Kramer, later the renowned guitarist for the MC5. According to Kramer, "Grimshaw was the best artist in our neighborhood" and "We drew hot rod cars and he knew the secret of how to capture chrome, which made him the coolest to a Downriver greaser like me." Grimshaw's social circle called themselves an "art gang" and they were also interested in jazz music, and Grimshaw was the only one among them who owned a car, a 1953 Ford two-door sedan. He would drive his friends from the working class, mostly white Polish Catholic suburb of Lincoln Park to the more cosmopolitan areas around Wayne State University in Detroit, looking for "beatnik parties" and listening to jazz performers like John Coltrane on the car radio.

After high school, Grimshaw briefly attended Wayne State University, but was more adept at partying than studying. He enlisted in the United States Navy to avoid being drafted into the Army. He served on the USS Coral Sea, an aircraft carrier stationed in the South China Sea during the Vietnam War, which sent aircraft on bombing raids over Vietnam. He was first exposed to psychedelic concert art when his ship was being repaired in the San Francisco Bay Area. While there, he visited two famous rock concert venues, the Avalon Ballroom and The Fillmore, and studied light show operators at work. He was discharged from the Navy in 1966, and returned to Detroit.

== Rock art and politics ==
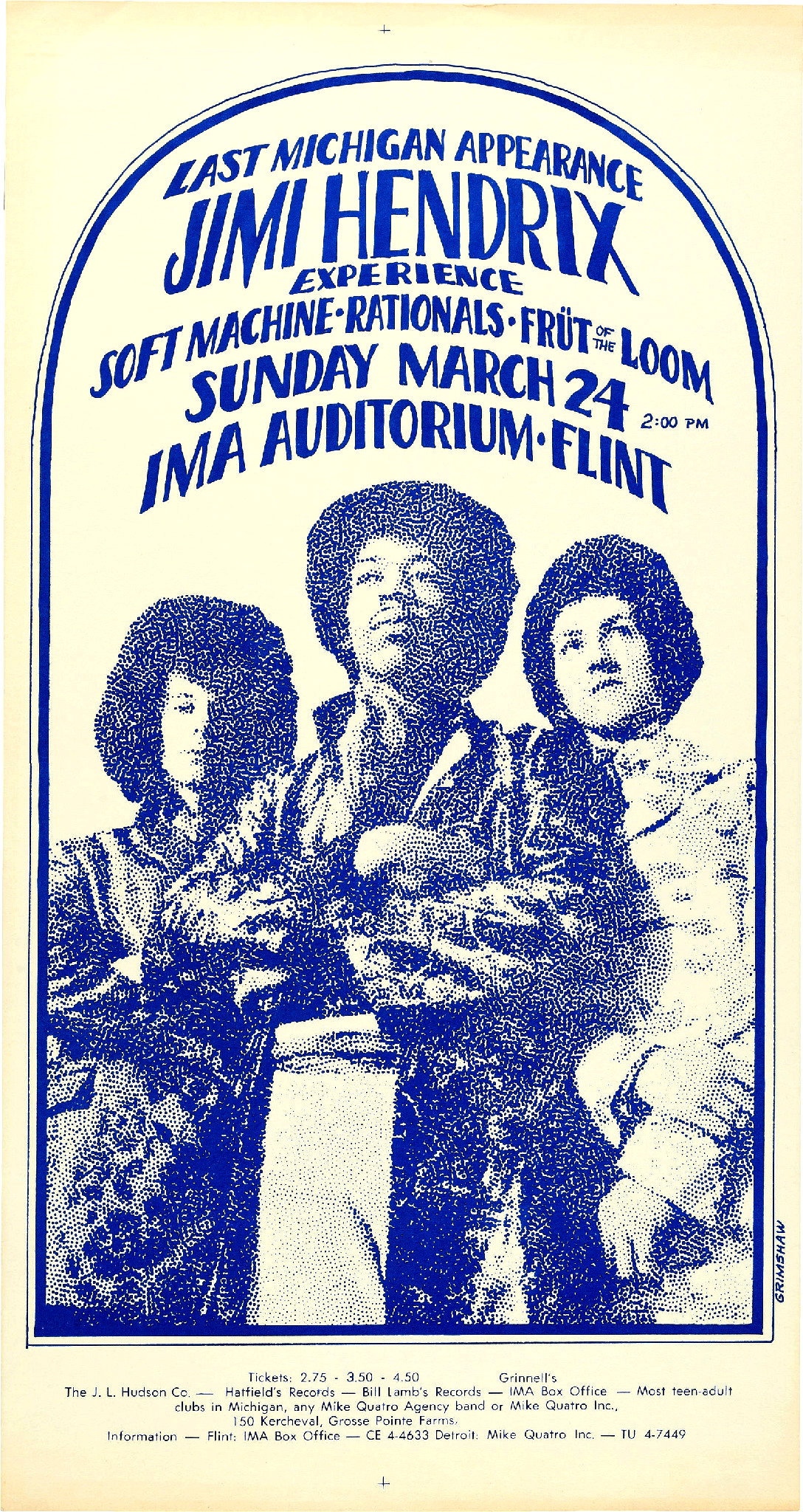
A 1968 poster by Gary Grimshaw

After Grimshaw's return to Detroit, promoter Russ Gibb hired him to perform light shows during rock performances at his new Grande Ballroom. Grimshaw designed the first poster for the Grande Ballroom, for a show on October 7, 1966, featuring the MC5 and billed as "A Dance Concert in the San Francisco Style". At a party about the same time, he met John Sinclair, a poet and jazz critic who had just been released from six months in jail on a marijuana conviction. That was the first time that Sinclair heard the MC5 perform, and he quickly became the band's manager and political mentor. Soon, Grimshaw was also designing posters for other bands performing at the Grande Ballroom and at other Detroit area rock music venues. His poster style was "psychedelic and heady, heavily embroidered with bright colors and flowing text." According to Grimshaw, his major influences were Stanley Mouse, Rick Griffin and Victor Moscoso.

Grimshaw was active in the anti-war movement and was a leading figure in the White Panther Party, founded in 1968 by John Sinclair, his wife Leni Sinclair and Pun Plamondon. He was Minister of Art for the White Panther Party which modeled itself after the Black Panther Party. His work appeared in many newspapers of the underground press, including the San Francisco Oracle, the Berkeley Tribe, the Fifth Estate and the Ann Arbor Sun.

Grimshaw did many posters for the MC5 and worked with the Detroit Artists Workshop, Translove, the Hill House commune in Ann Arbor, Michigan, and later for the Rainbow Peoples Party, successor to the White Panthers. He designed a cover for the MC5's inaugural album Kick Out the Jams, but it was replaced by a collage using photography by Joel Brodsky. He also designed the sleeve for the band's second single, "Looking at You", later included on the 1970 album Back in the USA. In the heyday of the Grande Ballroom, Grimshaw and Carl Lundgren were the two artists primarily responsible for its rock poster art. During that period, he did posters for performances by the Jimi Hendrix Experience, Cream, Canned Heat, The Who and many others.

In 1968, he was indicted on a marijuana charge in Grand Traverse County, Michigan along with Pun Plamondon, and fled to San Francisco and Boston, where he continued designing posters. While living in San Francisco in 1969, he helped the MC5 book an engagement at the Straight Theater in the Haight-Ashbury, and designed the poster for those performances. He surrendered on the marijuana charges in 1970 and beat the charges in court.

In 1969, the Michigan Court of Appeals overturned Grimshaw's 1967 conviction by a lower court on obscenity charges. Grimshaw had been convicted of displaying a "fifteen cent kite that had a dirty word lettered on it", and was sentenced to 15 days in jail and a $150.00 fine, but the court threw out his conviction and the Detroit ordinance, on the basis that it "unconstitutionally inhibits free speech". The slogan was "Fuck America - Go Fly a Kite".

His political mentor John Sinclair was sent to prison on marijuana charges in 1969, and Grimshaw worked hard for his freedom. One of Grimshaw's most "memorable, iconic" posters promoted the John Sinclair Freedom Rally, held in Ann Arbor on December 10, 1971, featuring performances by John Lennon, Yoko Ono, Stevie Wonder, Bob Seger, Archie Shepp and Phil Ochs. Speakers at the event included Bobby Seale of the Black Panther Party, Jerry Rubin of the Yippies, and beat poet Allen Ginsberg. Sinclair was freed within days of the rally.

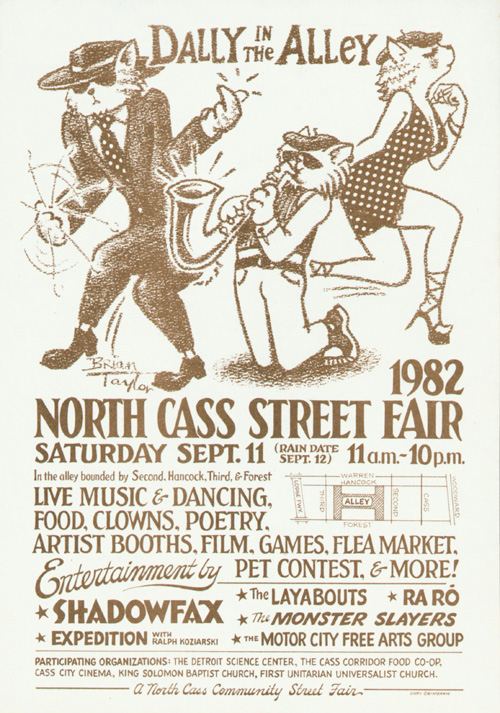
1982 poster

He was the art director for the Ann Arbor Blues and Jazz Festival in 1972 and 1973, and did posters for the festival in 1992 and 2000. He worked for Creem Magazine as an associate art director from 1976 to 1984.

== Later years and death ==
In 1988, Grimshaw designed the cover for Iggy Pop's album Instinct. In 1993, he designed a limited edition poster for the "Motor City Joint Show" at the Ubiquity Gallery in Ferndale, Michigan, highlighting work by Detroit poster artists Stanley Mouse, Wes Wilson, Mark Arminski and Grimshaw himself. During these years Grimshaw created posters for Beck, the White Stripes, The Greenhornes, the Dirtbombs and the Raveonettes, and for a 2004 tribute concert in memory of guitarist Fred "Sonic" Smith of the MC5. In December, 1999, the Detroit Free Press named him to its list of Michigan's 100 greatest artists and entertainers of the 20th century. He lived in San Francisco and Oakland, California from 1990 to 2004, when he relocated back to Detroit. From 1988 to 1991, he was art director of ArtRock, a concert poster producer.

Along with his longtime friend, photographer Leni Sinclair, he created a book called Detroit Rocks! A Pictorial History of Motor City Rock and Roll 1965-1975, which was published in 2012.

In 2008, Grimshaw was diagnosed with a brain tumor and had surgery. The tumor was later shown to be benign. He had a stroke at that time, and several other smaller strokes later. An abdominal blood clot led to surgery to remove most of his intestines.

Grimshaw died in Detroit on January 13, 2014, at the age of 67.
