= Fuentes v. Shevin =

- Supreme Court of the United States

Argued November 9, 1971 Decided June 12, 1972
- Full case name: Fuentes v. Shevin, Attorney General of Florida, et al.
- Citations: 407 U.S. 67 (more) 92 S. Ct. 1983; 32 L. Ed. 2d 556; 1972 U.S. LEXIS 42; 10 U.C.C. Rep. Serv. (Callaghan) 913

Holding
- Statutes in Florida and Pennsylvania that allowed for the repossession of petitioners' property without prior notice or hearing violated the Fourteenth Amendment's guarantee of procedural due process.

Court membership
- Chief Justice Warren E. Burger Associate Justices William O. Douglas · William J. Brennan Jr. Potter Stewart · Byron White; Thurgood Marshall · Harry Blackmun; Lewis F. Powell Jr. · William Rehnquist

Case opinions
- Majority: Stewart, joined by Douglas, Brennan, Marshall
- Dissent: White, joined by Burger, Blackmun
- Powell and Rehnquist took no part in the consideration or decision of the case.

Laws applied
- U.S. Const. Am. XIV

Fuentes v. Shevin, 407 U.S. 67 (1972), was a case decided by the Supreme Court of the United States wherein petitioners challenged the constitutionality of the Uniform Commercial Code provisions of two states, Florida and Pennsylvania, which allowed for the summary seizure of a person's goods or chattels under a writ of replevin. The statutes were challenged under the Fourteenth Amendment. The Court held that the statutes acted as deprivations of plaintiff's property without due process.

The Court noted that seizure without notice and the opportunity for a hearing is acceptable only under limited circumstances:

1. The seizure is necessary for an important public or government interest,
2. There is a need for prompt action, and
3. The seizure is initiated by an agent of the government.

These exceptions would apply (for example) when property is tainted food, misbranded drugs or unpaid taxes needed to fund a war.

== See also ==
- Kahn v. Shevin, 416 U.S. 351 (1974)
- Nebraska v. One 1970 2-Door Sedan Rambler (Gremlin), Nebraskan case that cited this
