= Things Remembered, Inc. v. Petrarca =

- Supreme Court of the United States

Argued October 2, 1995 Decided December 5, 1995
- Full case name: Things Remembered, Inc. v. Petrarca
- Citations: 516 U.S. 124 (more) 116 S. Ct. 494; 133 L. Ed. 2d 461; 1995 U.S. LEXIS 8531

Case history
- Prior: 65 F.3d 169 (6th Cir. 1994); cert. granted, 514 U.S. 1095 (1995).

Court membership
- Chief Justice William Rehnquist Associate Justices John P. Stevens · Sandra Day O'Connor; Antonin Scalia · Anthony Kennedy; David Souter · Clarence Thomas; Ruth Bader Ginsburg · Stephen Breyer

Case opinions
- Majority: Thomas, joined by unanimous
- Concurrence: Kennedy, joined by Ginsburg
- Concurrence: Ginsburg, joined by Stevens

Laws applied
- 28 U.S.C. §§ 1441, 1447, 1452

Things Remembered, Inc. v. Petrarca, 516 U.S. 124 (1995), was a case in which the United States Supreme Court held that when an action has been removed from state court to a United States Bankruptcy Court, and the bankruptcy court remands to state court because of a timely-raised defect in removal procedure or lack of subject-matter jurisdiction, the removal statute precludes a United States Court of Appeals from reviewing the order.

== Facts ==
Two corporations were parties to a litigation in an Ohio state court. The defendant filed a bankruptcy petition and sought to remove (transfer) the case to the federal Bankruptcy Court. The Bankruptcy Court accepted the removal, but on appeal, the District Court reversed, holding that the removal petition had been filed after the statutory deadline.

The debtor filed a further appeal to the United States Court of Appeals for the Sixth Circuit, but that court held that it lacked jurisdiction, because the removal statute barred the Court of Appeals from hearing appeals of remand orders. The Supreme Court granted certiorari to review the dismissal.

== Opinion of the Court ==
Justice Clarence Thomas authored the opinion of a unanimous Court, which affirmed the Sixth Circuit's decision. He began by observing that "Congress has placed broad restrictions on the power of federal appellate courts to review district court orders remanding removed cases to state court." In 28 U.S.C. § 1447(d), Congress provided that orders remanding civil cases to state court are not reviewable on appeal. Although the Court's decision in Thermtron Products, Inc. v. Hermansdorfer created an exception to this rule where the remand order was based on a ground not recognized by the removal statute, the exception did not apply here. The fact that the removal in this case was based on the bankruptcy removal statute, 28 U.S.C. § 1452, rather than the general removal statute, did not change the result.

== Concurring Opinions ==
Justice Anthony Kennedy wrote a short concurring opinion, joined by Justice Ruth Bader Ginsburg, observing that the precise limits of the rule created in Thermtron were not before the Court in this case.

Justice Ginsburg wrote a separate concurring opinion, joined by Justice John Paul Stevens, suggesting that the phrase "on any equitable ground" should be read to mean simply any ground for remand that the Bankruptcy Court or District Court believed was fair. She concluded that both 28 U.S.C. §§ 1447(d) and 1452(b) barred the Court of Appeals from reviewing the District Court's remand order.

== Advocates ==
Steven David Cundra argued the cause for the petitioner, Things Remembered, Inc. With him on the briefs were Patricia L. Taylor, Dean D. Gamin, and Mark A. Gamin. John C. Weisensell argued the cause for the respondent, Anthony Petrarca.
