= Lotus Development Corp. v. Borland International, Inc. =

- Supreme Court of the United States

Argued January 8, 1996 Decided January 16, 1996
- Full case name: Lotus Development Corporation v. Borland International, Inc.
- Citations: 516 U.S. 233 (more) 116 S. Ct. 804; 133 L. Ed. 2d 610; 1996 U.S. LEXIS 470

Case history
- Prior: Lotus claimed copyright infringement by Borland's Quattro Pro product. The district court ruled for Lotus. 831 F. Supp. 202 (D.Mass.1993). The First Circuit reversed, finding that the allegedly infringing features of Quattro Pro were a "method of operation" not subject to copyright. 49 F.3d 807 (1st Cir. 1995). Lotus petitioned the Supreme Court for a writ of certiorari, which was granted; however, because of a split opinion, the Supreme Court affirmed.

Holding
- The judgment of the United States Court of Appeals for the First Circuit is affirmed by an equally divided Court.

Court membership
- Chief Justice William Rehnquist Associate Justices John P. Stevens · Sandra Day O'Connor; Antonin Scalia · Anthony Kennedy; David Souter · Clarence Thomas; Ruth Bader Ginsburg · Stephen Breyer

Case opinion
- Per curiam
- Stevens took no part in the consideration or decision of the case.

Laws applied
- 17 U.S.C. section 102(b)

Lotus Development Corp. v. Borland International, Inc., 516 U.S. 233 (1996), is a United States Supreme Court case that tested the extent of software copyright. The lower court had held that copyright does not extend to the user interface of a computer program, such as the text and layout of menus. Due to the recusal of one justice, the Supreme Court decided the case with an eight-member bench split evenly, leaving the lower court's decision affirmed but setting no national precedent.

== Background information ==
Borland released a spreadsheet product, Quattro Pro, with a compatibility mode in which its menu imitated Lotus 1-2-3, a competing product. None of the source code or machine code that generated the menus was copied, but the names of the commands and the organization of those commands into a hierarchy were virtually identical.

Quattro Pro also contained a "Key Reader" feature, which allowed it to execute Lotus 1-2-3 keyboard macros. To support this feature, Quattro Pro's code contained a copy of Lotus's menu hierarchy in which each command was represented by its first letter instead of its entire name.

Borland CEO Philippe Kahn took the case to the software development community arguing that Lotus's position would stifle innovation and damage the future of software development. The vast majority of the software development community supported Borland's position.

== District Court case ==
Lotus filed suit in the United States District Court for the District of Massachusetts on July 2, 1990, claiming that the structure of the menus was copyrighted by Lotus. The district court ruled that Borland had infringed Lotus's copyright. The ruling was based in part on the fact that an alternative satisfactory menu structure could be designed. For example, the "Quit" command could be changed to "Exit".

Borland immediately removed the Lotus-based menu system from Quattro Pro, but retained support for its "Key Reader" feature, and Lotus filed a supplemental claim against this feature. A district court held that this also constituted copyright infringement.

== Circuit Court case ==
Borland appealed the decision of the district court arguing that the menu hierarchy is a "method of operation", which is not copyrightable according to 17 U.S.C. § 102(b).

The United States Court of Appeals for the First Circuit reversed the district court's decision, agreeing with Borland's legal theory that considered the menu hierarchy a "method of operation". The court agreed with the district court that an alternative menu hierarchy could be devised, but argued that despite this, the menu hierarchy is an uncopyrightable "method of operation".

We hold that the Lotus menu command hierarchy is an uncopyrightable “method of operation.” The Lotus menu command hierarchy provides the means by which users control and operate Lotus 1–2–3. If users wish to copy material, for example, they use the “Copy” command. If users wish to print material, they use the “Print” command. Users must use the command terms to tell the computer what to do. Without the menu command hierarchy, users would not be able to access and control, or indeed make use of, Lotus 1–2–3's functional capabilities.

The court made an analogy between the menu hierarchy and the arrangement of buttons on a VCR. The buttons are used to control the playback of a video tape, just as the menu commands are used to control the operations of Lotus 1-2-3. Since the buttons are essential to operating the VCR, their layout cannot be copyrighted. Likewise, the menu commands, including the textual labels and the hierarchical layout, are essential to operating Lotus 1-2-3.

The court also considered the impact of their decision on users of software. If menu hierarchies were copyrightable, users would be required to learn how to perform the same operation in a different way for every program, which the court finds "absurd". Additionally, all macros would have to be re-written for each different program, which places an undue burden on users.

=== Concurring opinion ===
Judge Michael Boudin wrote a concurring opinion for this case. In this opinion, he discusses the costs and benefits of copyright protection, as well as the potential similarity of software copyright protection to patent protection. He argues that software is different from creative works, which makes it difficult to apply copyright law to software.

His opinion also considers the theory that Borland's use of the Lotus menu is "privileged". That is, because Borland copied the menu for a legitimate purpose of compatibility, its use should be allowed. This decision, if issued by the majority of the court, would have been narrower in scope than the "method of operations" decision. Copying a menu hierarchy would be allowed in some circumstances, and disallowed in others.

== Supreme Court case ==
Lotus petitioned the United States Supreme Court for a writ of certiorari. In a per curiam opinion, the Supreme Court affirmed the circuit court's judgment due to an evenly divided court, with Justice Stevens recusing. Because the Court split evenly, it affirmed the First Circuit's decision without discussion and did not establish any national precedent on the copyright issue. Lotus's petition for a rehearing by the full court was denied. By the time the lawsuit ended, Borland had sold Quattro Pro to Novell, and Microsoft's Excel spreadsheet had emerged as the main challenger to Lotus 1-2-3.

== Impact ==
The Lotus decision establishes a distinction in copyright law between the interface of a software product and its implementation. The implementation is subject to copyright. The public interface may also be subject to copyright to the extent that it contains expression (for example, the appearance of an icon). However, the set of available operations and the mechanics of how they are activated are not copyrightable. This standard allows software developers to create competing versions of copyrighted software products without infringing the copyright. See software clone for infringement and compliance cases.

Lotus v. Borland has been used as a lens through which to view the controversial case in Oracle America, Inc. v. Google, Inc., dealing with the copyrightability of software application programming interfaces (APIs) and interoperability of software. Software APIs are designed to allow developers to insure compatibility, but should APIs be found to be copyrightable, that could drastically affect the development of software, as the threat of litigation for building interoperability (a core feature of computing, as it has developed over the decades of worldwide use) would present a chilling effect and coerce the establishment of walled gardens around islands of mutually-incompatible software ecosystems, causing millions of man-hours to be lost in re-implementation and quality assurance testing of the same software across multiple concurrent systems, leading to divergent software development paths and a drastically increased attack surface for potential illicit exploitation.

== See also ==
- List of United States Supreme Court cases, volume 516
- List of United States Supreme Court cases
- Lists of United States Supreme Court cases by volume
- List of United States Supreme Court cases by the Rehnquist Court
