= Nebraska v. One 1970 2-Door Sedan Rambler (Gremlin) =

1974 Nebraska Supreme Court case

- Court: Nebraska Supreme Court
- Full case name: State of Nebraska v. One 1970 2-Door Sedan Rambler (Gremlin)
- Decided: March 14, 1974
- Citation: 215 N.W.2d 849 (1974)

Case opinions
- Decision by: Chief Justice White
- Concurrence: Justice Spencer, Justice Boslaugh and Justice Newton
- Concur/dissent: 4–2
- Dissent: Justice McCown, Justice Clinton

Nebraska v. One 1970 2-Door Sedan Rambler (Gremlin) 191 Neb. 462, 215 N.W.2d 849 (1974) is a Nebraska Supreme Court civil forfeiture case. It was brought by the U.S. state of Nebraska to seize a Rambler Gremlin on the sole grounds it was transporting illegal marijuana. The owner appealed against the forfeiture decision on the grounds of a claimed lack of due process. The court ruled 4–2 and sustained the confiscation as lawful.

The form of the styling of this case—the appellant and defendant being an object, rather than a legal person—is because this is a jurisdiction in rem (power over objects) case, (Note: in rem jurisdiction (in rem) A court's power to adjudicate the rights to a given piece of property including the power to seize and hold it. Also termed jurisdiction in rem. See IN REM Cf. personal jurisdiction. in rem (in rem) adj. ["Against a thing"] involving or determining the status of a thing, and therefore the rights of persons generally with respect to that thing. — also termed (archaically) – in rem, adv. See action in rem under ACTION. Cf. IN PERSONAM. "An action in rem is one in which the judgment of the court determines the title to property and the rights of the parties, not merely as between themselves, but also as against all persons at any time dealing with them or the property upon which the court had adjudicated.") rather than the more familiar in personam (over persons) case.

== Background ==
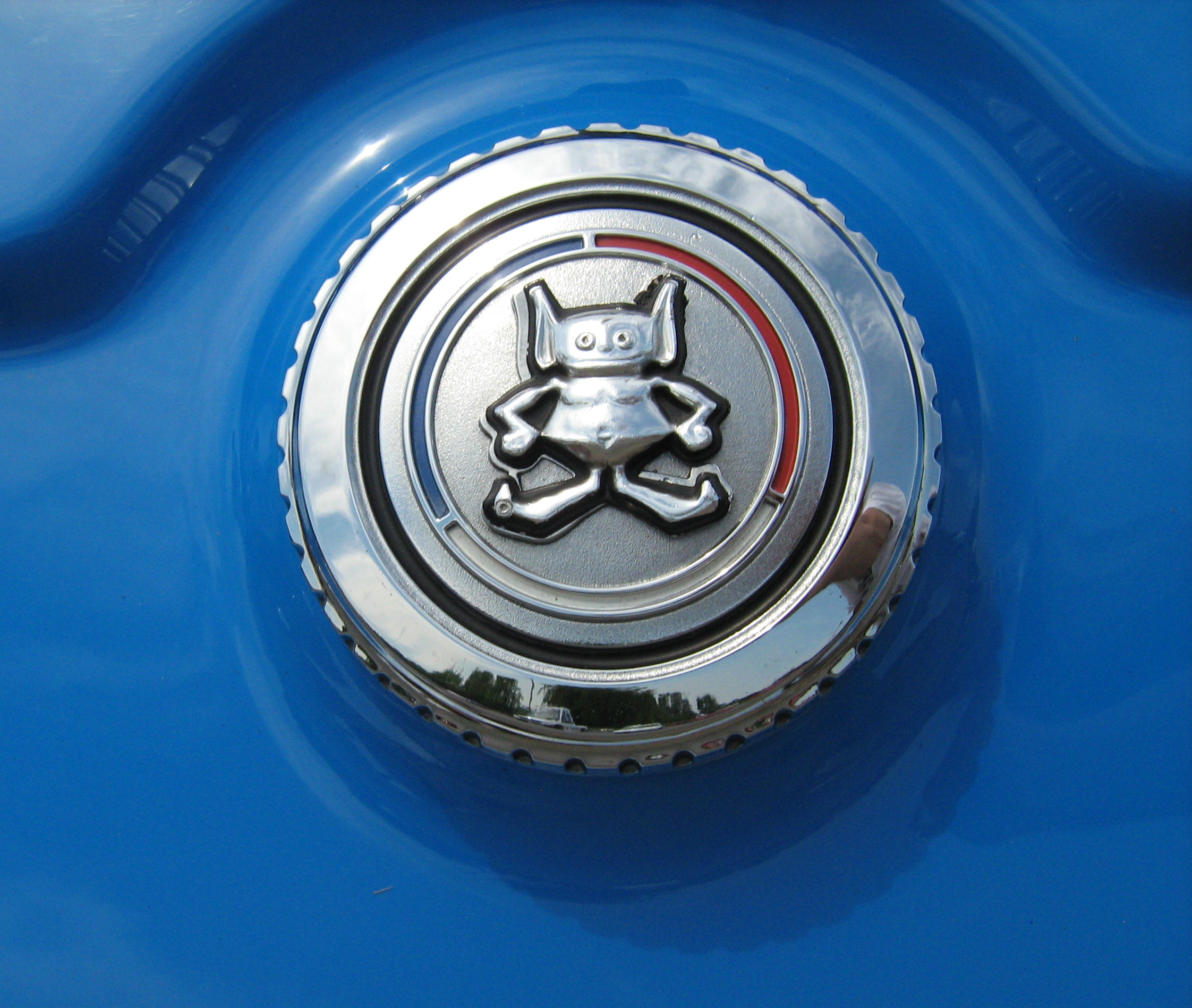
AMC Gremlin logo on gas cap

On February 14, 1972, Donald Ruyle was arrested in possession of marijuana after he had driven in his 1970 Rambler Gremlin to a friend's house in Beatrice, Nebraska, that was under surveillance by the police. His car was locked and the next day he granted permission for the police to search it while in custody. Inside, the police found marijuana joint butts. Ruyle was sentenced to a week in jail for possession and transportation of marijuana and fined $350. Accordingly, they seized his car for transporting drugs; Ruyle appealed the seizure order.

== Case ==
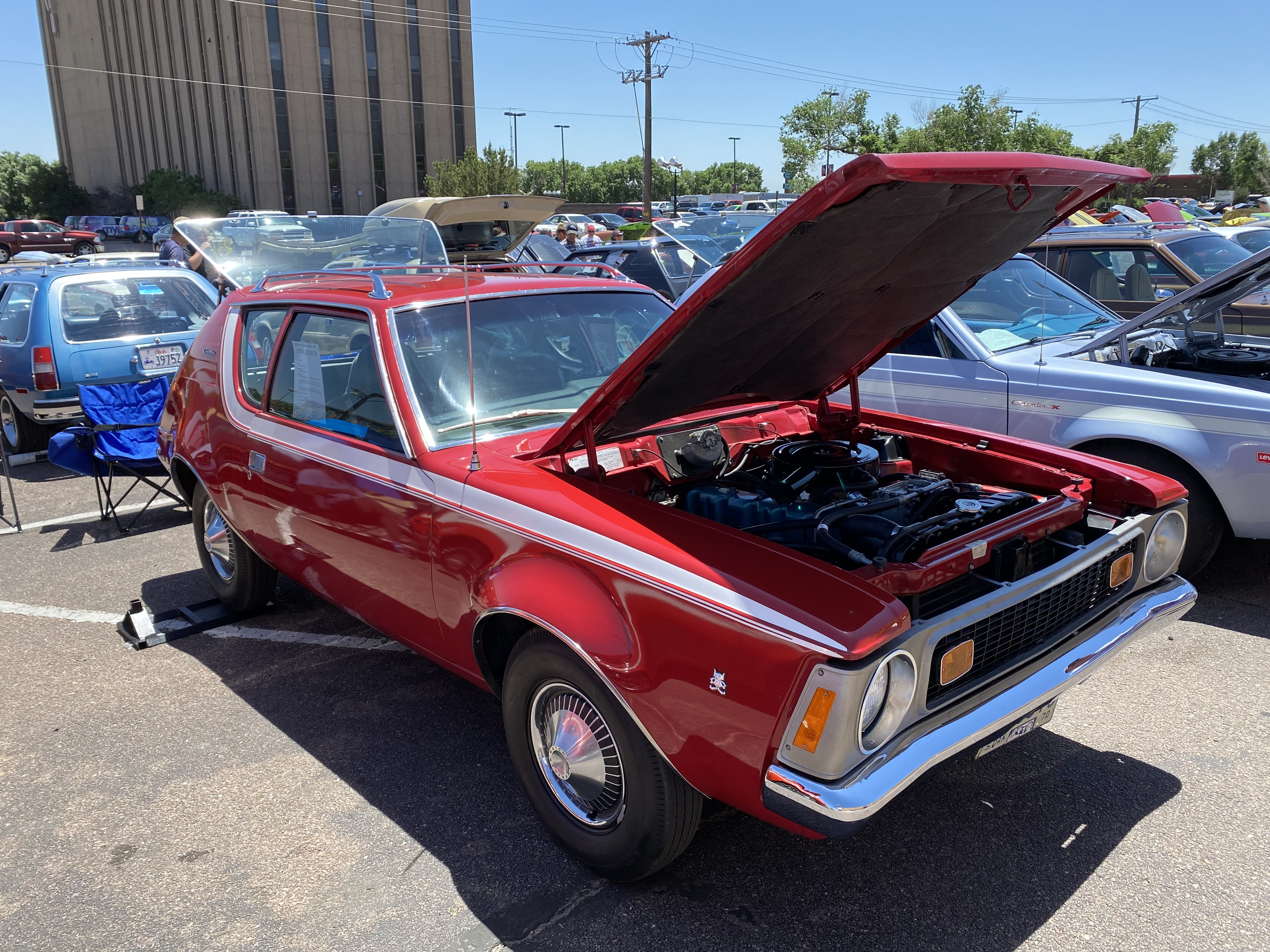
1970 AMC Gremlin

Ruyle contended that the notice informing him of the seizure was an arrogation in violation of the Due Process Clause of the United States Constitution. He argued he had not been properly notified nor had a hearing taken place to discuss the legality of the seizure. Rejecting the claim, the court held that the car was seized immediately on the street and taken as evidence to an impound lot to remove the drugs before the seizure order was issued, all within process and Ruyle had been notified. Ruyle also contended that under Nebraskan state law, the word "transport" meant drug trafficking, not merely carrying drugs. The court ruled that though "transport" was not clearly defined in law, it decided to take the public's general understanding that it meant "to carry or convey from one place or station to another".

The court ruled 4–2 in favor of the seizure. The judgment was read by Chief Justice White. It was concurred with by Justices Spencer, Boslaugh and Newton. Justice Smith abstained from issuing a ruling. Justice McCown dissented on the grounds that the court declined to rule that Fuentes v. Shevin, which the defendant cited, was controlling. McCown ruled that it was and accordingly the seizure would have been unlawful. Justice Clinton also dissented on the grounds that the court's interpretation of "transport" was too broad, meaning that someone who had a box of Kleenex in their glove compartment, would be "transporting" the Kleenex.

The case has since been cited in other state supreme court opinions as precedent. It was also used by the Drug Enforcement Administration as grounds for asserting that Nebraska followed the federal rules for forfeiture of conveyances when they are discovered with illegal substances within them.

The case is illustrative of bedrock legal practices in the United States. In deciding a forfeiture case rooted in a forfeiture prohibition, the Supreme Court stated the principle: "But whether the reason [for the forfeiture] be artificial or real, it is too firmly fixed in the punitive and remedial jurisprudence of this country to now be displaced."

As one law review notes:

When certain kinds of property are involved in the commission of a crime or as instrumentality of a crime, they may be subject to seizure and forfeiture to the government. Yet neither the fact of the crime nor the participation of the owner to the property may be critical to the forfeiture. The property may be beneficial in its own right, and its owner unaware of the illegal use, and the forfeiture will attach.

The case name has been the source of bemusement. However, its format is a result of an in rem civil forfeiture, which is against the offending thing, and not a person. The burden of proof in such proceedings is placed on the object to prove its innocence. (Note: "In a real sense, the property itself is on trial. That's reflected in the bizarre case names associated with civil asset forfeiture proceedings, such as 'Nebraska v. One 1970 2-Door Sedan Rambler (Gremlin).'") (Note: As approved by the Supreme Court of the United States in Bennis v. Michigan, at least on a constitutional due process of law level, the fact that the owner of the vehicle is innocent and completely unaware of the criminal activity (the owner's husband was allegedly consorting with a prostitute while in the wife's car) is an irrelevancy.)

== Epilogue ==
When the property is on trial, as it was in a Texas case, the burden of proof is on the property to prove the negative. Some critics opine that "Cash is not a crime" and this is "Violating the American justice system's cornerstone presumption of innocence, those whose property has been taken via civil asset forfeiture must prove their property wasn't involved in a crime – or lose it forever...." In Texas, such cases can be initiated by the filing of a simple affidavit, even by officers who did not witness the underlying event itself.

There was an Indiana case (involving forfeiture of a Land Rover) (Note: Purchased by Tyson Timbs with $42,058.30, using life insurance proceeds he received upon his father's death. Timbs admitted to being addicted to use of Opioids, which were taken to alleviate chronic pain. Mr. Timbs pleaded guilty in Indiana state court to Dealing in a Controlled Substance and Conspiracy to Commit Theft.) which successfully alleged that civil forfeitures may violate the Eighth Amendment to the United States Constitution's ban on excessive fines, as incorporated by the Fourteenth Amendment to the United States Constitution and thereby applicable to the states. In fact, the court held in Timbs v. Indiana 586 U.S. _____, 139 S. Ct. 682 (2019) that the 8th Amendment applied to the State of Indiana, and that the forfeiture might be excessive and unlawful. The court remanded for further proceedings to determine the factual question of excessiveness. The case was also noteworthy for its omissions. While discussing "excessive" broadly, it did not mention ability to pay or the effect of the forfeiture on the fortunes and employment of the loser.

== See also ==
- Bennis v. Michigan
- Civil forfeiture in the United States
- In rem jurisdiction
- United States v. Schooner Peggy
