= United States v. United States District Court =

United States v. U.S. District Court
- Supreme Court of the United States

Argued February 24, 1972 Decided June 19, 1972
- Full case name: United States v. United States District Court for the Eastern District of Michigan, et al. (Plamondon, et al., real parties in interest)
- Citations: 407 U.S. 297 (more) 92 S. Ct. 2125; 32 L. Ed. 2d 752; 1972 U.S. LEXIS 38

Holding
- Government officials are obligated to obtain a warrant before beginning electronic surveillance even when domestic security issues are involved. The "inherent vagueness of the domestic security concept" and the potential for abusing it to quell political dissent make the Fourth Amendment protections especially important when the government engaged in spying on its own citizens.

Court membership
- Chief Justice Warren E. Burger Associate Justices William O. Douglas · William J. Brennan Jr. Potter Stewart · Byron White; Thurgood Marshall · Harry Blackmun; Lewis F. Powell Jr. · William Rehnquist

Case opinions
- Majority: Powell, joined by Douglas, Brennan, Stewart, Marshall, Blackmun
- Concurrence: Burger (concurred in the result without opinion)
- Concurrence: Douglas
- Concurrence: White
- Rehnquist took no part in the consideration or decision of the case.

Laws applied
- U.S. Const. amend. IV

United States v. U.S. District Court, 407 U.S. 297 (1972), also known as the Keith Case, is a landmark decision of the United States Supreme Court that upheld, in a unanimous 8-0 ruling, the requirements of the Fourth Amendment in cases of domestic surveillance targeting a domestic threat.

The United States charged John Sinclair, Lawrence 'Pun' Plamondon, and John Forrest with conspiracy to destroy government property. One of the defendants, Lawrence 'Pun' Plamondon, was also charged with the dynamite bombing of an office of the Central Intelligence Agency in Ann Arbor, Michigan. The defendants were leaders of the radical White Panther Party. In response to a pretrial motion by the defense for disclosure of all electronic surveillance information, Nixon's attorney general, John Mitchell, claimed he authorized the wiretaps pursuant to Title III of the Omnibus Crime Control and Safe Streets Act of 1968 and was not required to disclose the sources. Though warrantless, the act allows for an exception to prevent the overthrow of the government and when "any other clear and present danger to the structure or existence of the Government" exists. The Government contended that since the defendants were members of a domestic organization attempting to subvert and destroy it, this case fell under the exception clause.

After reading the briefs and hearing oral arguments by constitutional law attorney Hugh M. "Buck" Davis, Judge Damon Keith of the United States District Court for the Eastern District of Michigan disagreed and ordered the Government to disclose all of the illegally intercepted conversations to the defendants. The Government appealed, filing a petition for a writ of mandamus with the Court of Appeals for the Sixth Circuit to set aside the order. The Sixth Circuit also rejected the Government's arguments and upheld the lower court decision.

== The decision ==
The Supreme Court upheld the prior rulings in the case, holding that the wiretaps were an unconstitutional violation of the Fourth Amendment and as such must be disclosed to the defense. This established the precedent that a warrant needed to be obtained before beginning electronic surveillance even if domestic security issues were involved. Note that the decision applied only to domestic issues; foreign intelligence operations were not bound by the same standards. The governing law for electronic surveillance of "foreign intelligence information" between or among "foreign powers" is the Foreign Intelligence Surveillance Act (FISA) of 1978.

== Quotations ==
- "The price of lawful public dissent must not be a dread of subjection to an unchecked surveillance power. Nor must the fear of unauthorized official eavesdropping deter vigorous citizen dissent and discussion of Government action in private conversation. For private dissent, no less than open public discourse, is essential to our free society."; Lewis Powell, writing for the Majority.
- "As I read it—and this is my fear—we are saying that the President, on his motion, could declare—name your favorite poison—draft dodgers, Black Muslims, the Ku Klux Klan, or civil rights activists to be a clear and present danger to the structure or existence of the Government."; Senator Philip A. Hart, quoted by Lewis Powell, writing for the Majority.
- "History abundantly documents the tendency of Government—however benevolent and benign its motives—to view with suspicion those who most fervently dispute its policies. Fourth Amendment protections become the more necessary when the targets of official surveillance may be those suspected of unorthodoxy in their political beliefs. The danger to political dissent is acute where the Government attempts to act under so vague a concept as the power to protect "domestic security". Given the difficulty of defining the domestic security interest, the danger of abuse in acting to protect that interest becomes apparent."; Lewis Powell, writing for the Majority.
- "This is an important phase in the campaign of the police and intelligence agencies to obtain exemptions from the Warrant Clause of the Fourth Amendment. For, due to the clandestine nature of electronic eaves-dropping, the need is acute for placing on the Government the heavy burden to show that "exigencies of the situation [make its] course imperative." Other abuses, such as the search incident to arrest, have been partly deterred by the threat of damage actions against offending officers, the risk of adverse publicity, or the possibility of reform through the political process. These latter safeguards, however, are ineffective against lawless wiretapping and "bugging" of which their victims are totally unaware. Moreover, even the risk of exclusion of tainted evidence would here appear to be of negligible deterrent value inasmuch as the United States frankly concedes that the primary purpose of these searches is to fortify its intelligence collage rather than to accumulate evidence to support indictments and convictions. If the Warrant Clause were held inapplicable here, then the federal intelligence machine would literally enjoy unchecked discretion."; William O. Douglas, in a concurring opinion.
- "Here, federal agents wish to rummage for months on end through every conversation, no matter how intimate or personal, carried over selected telephone lines, simply to seize those few utterances which may add to their sense of the pulse of a domestic underground."; William O. Douglas, in a concurring opinion.
- "We are told that one national security wiretap lasted for 14 months and monitored over 900 conversations. Senator Edward Kennedy found recently that 'warrantless devices accounted for an average of 78 to 209 days of listening per device, as compared with a 13-day per device average for those devices installed under court order.' He concluded that the Government's revelations posed 'the frightening possibility that the conversations of untold thousands of citizens of this country are being monitored on secret devices which no judge has authorized and which may remain in operation for months and perhaps years at a time.' Even the most innocent and random caller who uses or telephones into a tapped line can become a flagged number in the Government's data bank."; William O. Douglas, in a concurring opinion.

== See also ==
- Richard Nixon
- John N. Mitchell
- Telephone tapping
- Foreign Intelligence Surveillance Act of 1978
- ACLU v. NSA (6th Cir. 2007)
- List of United States Supreme Court cases, volume 407
