= Grande Ballroom =

Live music venue in Detroit, Michigan, US

- The Grande
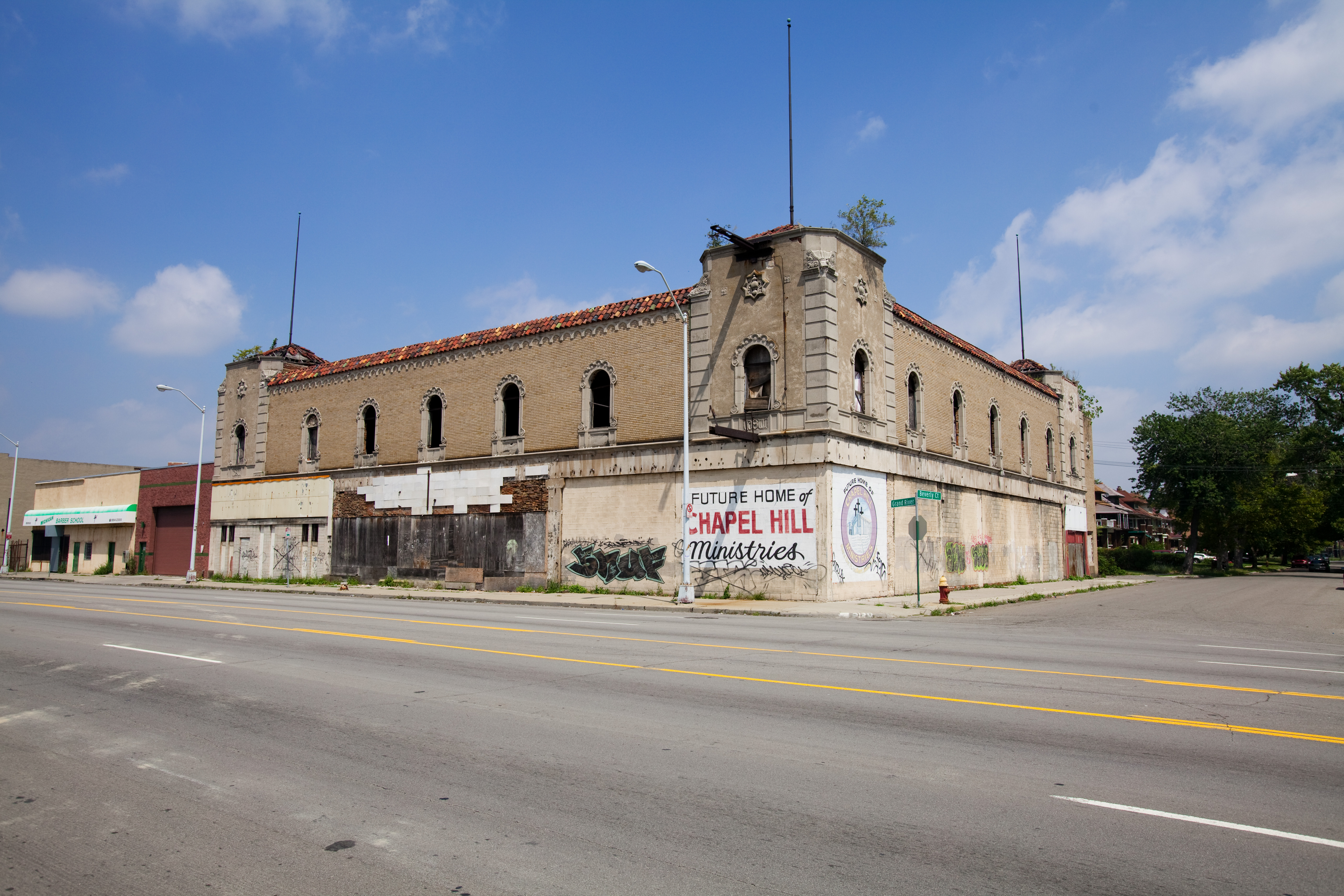
- Grande Ballroom from Grand River Avenue in August, 2009
- Interactive map of Grande Ballroom
- Location: 8952 Grand River Avenue; Detroit, Michigan
- Coordinates: 42°21′53.4″N 83°07′42.5″W
- Capacity: 1,837
- Events: Jazz, Big Band, Rock

Construction
- Opened: 1909, 1928 (dance hall); 1966 (rock venue)
- Renovated: 1921, 1966
- Closed: 1972

Website
- http://www.thegrandeballroom.com/
- Grande Ballroom
- U.S. National Register of Historic Places
- Area: less than one acre
- Built: 1929
- Architect: Charles N. Agree
- Architectural style: Art Deco
- NRHP reference No.: 100003226
- Added to NRHP: December 10, 2018

The Grande Ballroom (/ˈɡrændi/ GRAND-ee) is a historic live music venue located at 8952 Grand River Avenue in the Petosky-Otsego neighborhood of Detroit, Michigan. The building was designed by Detroit engineer and architect Charles N. Agree in 1928 and originally served as a multi-purpose building, hosting retail business on the first floor and a large dance hall upstairs. During this period the Grande was renowned for its outstanding hardwood dance floor which took up most of the second floor.

== History ==
Around 1927, Detroit businessman Harry Weitzman approached Agree about creating the ballroom. Weitzman financed and owned the ballroom, which was popular in the Jewish community and a hangout for the Purple Gang. His children's initials are carved under a windowsill at the venue (CDSW: Clement, Dorothy, and Seymour Weitzman).

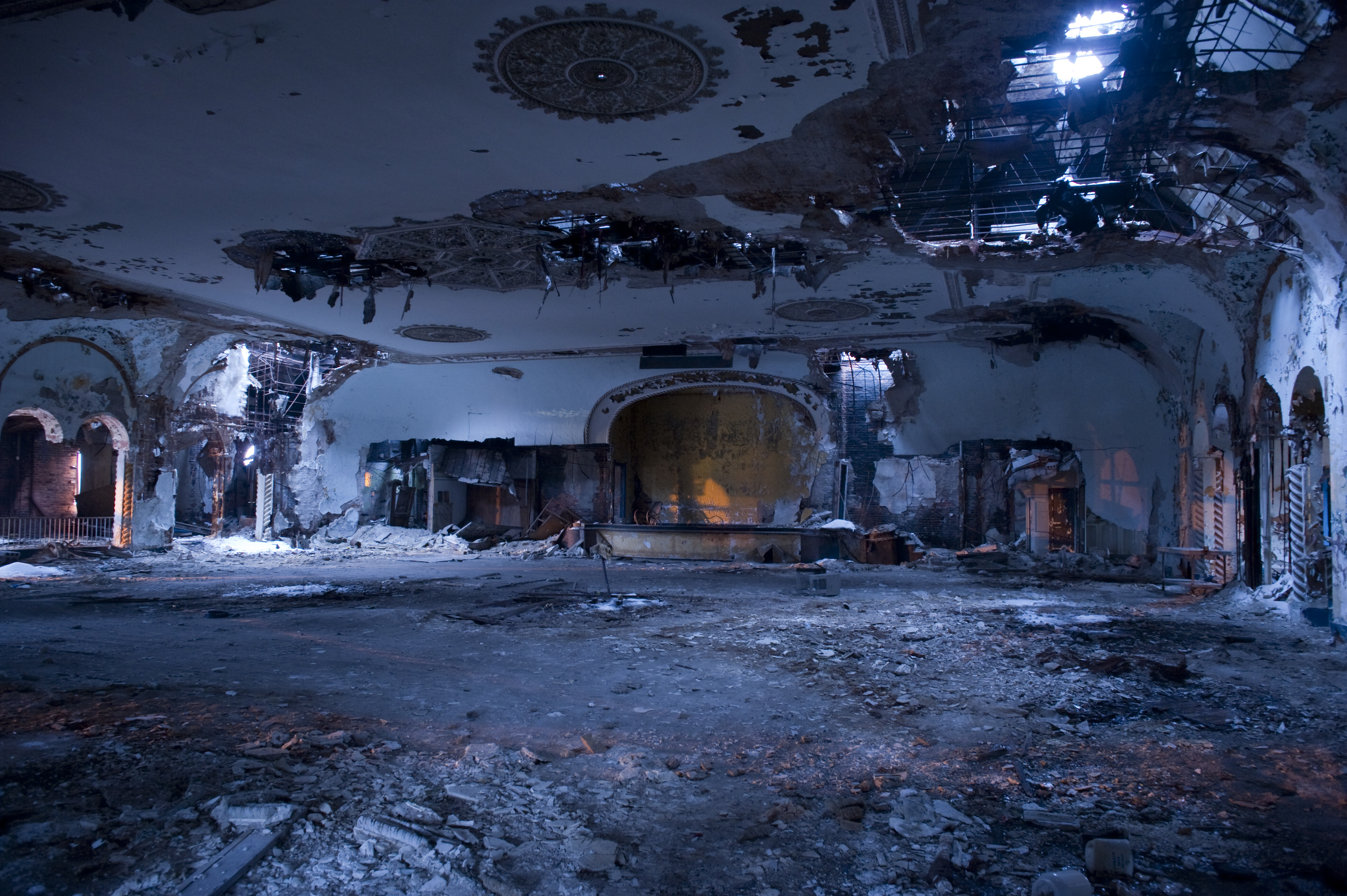
The dance hall, located on the second floor, in 2010

In 1966 the Grande was acquired by Dearborn, Michigan, high school teacher and local radio DJ Russ Gibb. Gibb was inspired by visiting San Francisco's Fillmore Theater, and envisioned a similar venue in Detroit for the new psychedelic music and a resource for local teenagers. Gibb worked closely with Detroit counterculture figure John Sinclair and Hugh "JEEP" Holland (agent, producer/manager of many local bands) in bringing in bands from San Francisco, Europe and the neighbouring States and the top level of local/regional rock bands, including the Amboy Dukes (with Ted Nugent), Rationals, MC5 (who recorded their debut live album there), The Jagged Edge (aka Stoney & The Jagged Edge), Psychedelic Stooges (aka The Stooges), SRC (aka Scot Richard Case), The Frost (with Dick Wagner), Frijid Pink, The Third Power, Savage Grace, Alice Cooper Group, Catfish, The Ashmollyan Quintet, Our Mothers Children, Wilson Mower Pursuit, Sky, All the Lonely people, Teegarden and Vanwinkle, Iron Horse Exchange, and many others who were gathering around Detroit's Plum Street community as well as the suburbs, as far afield as Ann Arbor. With managers Tom Wright, Bill Robbins and others (including, periodically Jeep and Sinclair) and local character Dave Miller, the club booked and presented many national and international acts – as well as future Rock and Roll Hall of Famers – of this period including Led Zeppelin, Janis Joplin, Pink Floyd, the Grateful Dead, Howlin' Wolf, John Lee Hooker, Jeff Beck, Procol Harum, Cream and The Who. The MC5, The Thyme, and The Stooges served as house bands, assuring weekly performances. The Grande also featured the avant garde jazz of John Coltrane and Sun Ra.

Performances of this period were frequently advertised by the distinctive psychedelic handbills of Gary Grimshaw and Carl Lundgren. The Grande's rock and roll countercultural experience was extensively documented by Detroit photographer Leni Sinclair. It was during this period that the Ballroom became known as the "hippie capitalist center of Detroit".

Since Gibb closed the Grande as a rock venue in 1972, the building has rarely been used and has fallen into a state of extreme disrepair. As of 2014, the historic club remains inactive and open to redevelopment.

Louder Than Love: The Grande Ballroom Story, a 2012 documentary film about the venue and its influence on rock music, was awarded an Emmy by the National Academy of Television Arts & Sciences of Michigan in 2016. The film was produced and directed by Tony D’Annunzio.

In December 2018, the Grande Ballroom was added to the National Register of Historic Places.

== Description ==
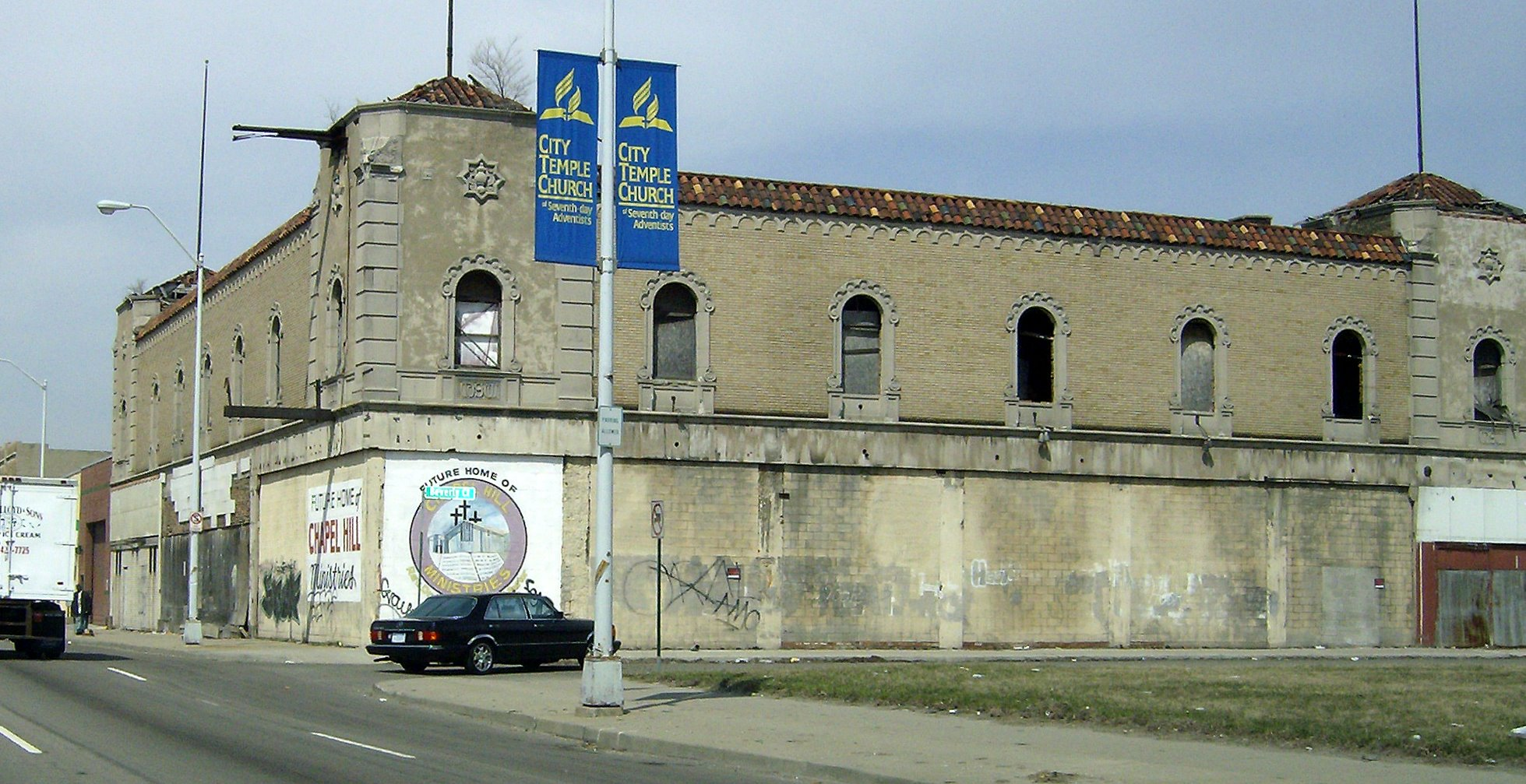
The Grande in 2008

The Grande Ballroom is a square, two-story, yellow-buff brick commercial building, containing elements of Spanish Revival and Mediterranean Revival architectural styled. The first floor contains retail spaces, and the second contains a large ballroom. The exterior has round-arch window openings with limestone friezes on the second floor, with low tiled pent roofs above. The first floor originally held six storefronts, each with large plate glass windows and prismatic glass transoms above. These storefronts have been substantially altered. The three corners of the ballroom facing the street each have a slightly projecting tower with an octagonal cap and a decorative urn and star design on the center on each face, and a low tiled hip roof on top.
