= List of United States Supreme Court cases, volume 516 =

This is a list of all the United States Supreme Court cases from volume 516 of the United States Reports:

Case name	Citation	Date decided
Wood v. Bartholomew	516 U.S. 1	1995
Tuggle v. Netherland	516 U.S. 10	1995
Citizens Bank of Md. v. Strumpf	516 U.S. 16	1995
Louisiana v. Mississippi	516 U.S. 22	1995
Libretti v. United States	516 U.S. 29	1995
Field v. Mans	516 U.S. 59	1995
NLRB v. Town & Country Elec., Inc.	516 U.S. 85	1995
Thompson v. Keohane	516 U.S. 99	1995
Louisiana v. Mississippi	516 U.S. 122	1995
Things Remembered, Inc. v. Petrarca	516 U.S. 124	1995
Bailey v. United States	516 U.S. 137	1995
Locomotive Engineers v. Atchison, T. & S. F. R. Co.	516 U.S. 152	1996
Lawrence v. Chater	516 U.S. 163	1996
Stutson v. United States	516 U.S. 193	1996
Yamaha Motor Corp., U.S.A. v. Calhoun	516 U.S. 199	1996
Zicherman v. Korean Air Lines Co.	516 U.S. 217	1996
Lotus Development Corp. v. Borland International, Inc.	516 U.S. 233	1996
Commissioner v. Lundy	516 U.S. 235	1996
Bank One Chicago, N. A. v. Midwest Bank & Trust Co.	516 U.S. 264	1996
Neal v. United States	516 U.S. 284	1996
Attwood v. Singletary	516 U.S. 297	1996
Behrens v. Pelletier	516 U.S. 299	1996
Fulton Corp. v. Faulkner	516 U.S. 325	1996
Peacock v. Thomas	516 U.S. 349	1996
Jones v. ABC-TV	516 U.S. 363	1996
United States v. Maine	516 U.S. 365	1996
Matsushita Elec. Industrial Co. v. Epstein	516 U.S. 367	1996
Norfolk & Western R. Co. v. Hiles	516 U.S. 400	1996
United States v. Chesapeake & Potomac Telephone Co. of Va.	516 U.S. 415	1996
Hercules, Inc. v. United States	516 U.S. 417	1996
Bennis v. Michigan	516 U.S. 442	1996
Dalton v. Little Rock Family Planning Services	516 U.S. 474	1996
Meghrig v. KFC Western, Inc.	516 U.S. 479	1996
Varity Corp. v. Howe	516 U.S. 489	1996
FCC v. Radiofone, Inc.	516 U.S. 1301	1996
