= Leni Sinclair =

German-born American photographer

- Born: Magdalene Arndt; March 8, 1940 (age 85); Königsberg, Germany
- Occupations: Photographer, activist
- Known for: Founder of the White Panther Party
- Spouse: John Sinclair (m. 1965; div. 1988)
- Children: 2

Magdalene "Leni" Sinclair (née Arndt; March 8, 1940) is an American photographer and radical political activist. She has photographed rock and jazz musicians since the early 1960s. She was the co-founder of the White Panther Party along with John Sinclair and Pun Plamondon. She was also Minister of Education of the party. She lives in Detroit.

== Early life ==
Magdalene Arndt was born on March 8, 1940, in Königsberg, Germany, later renamed Kaliningrad when it became territory of the Soviet Union. She grew up in the village of Vahldorf near Magdeburg in East Germany where she listened to American jazz artists such as Harry Belafonte, Louis Armstrong and Ella Fitzgerald on Radio Luxemburg. She emigrated to the United States in 1959, living with relatives in Detroit while studying geography at Wayne State University. There, she was involved with a short-lived arts project called the Red Door Gallery.

In 1964, she met poet and jazz critic John Sinclair, and with 14 other people, they founded the Detroit Artists Workshop on November 1, 1964. That group soon established a network of communal houses, and a performance space and print shop. Arndt began photographing jazz musicians performing in Detroit, including John Coltrane, Miles Davis, Thelonious Monk and Yusuf Lateef. She married John Sinclair in 1965 at the First Unitarian Church of Detroit on Cass Avenue. They had two children, Marion Sunny Sinclair, born in 1967, and Celia Sanchez Mao Sinclair, born in 1970.

== Art and activism ==
In October 1965, the Detroit Artists Workshop was raided by 25 police officers, and six people, including Sinclair's husband John, were arrested on marijuana charges. John Sinclair, already on probation as a result of a previous marijuana arrest, was later sentenced to six months in jail. When he was released in August 1966, Leni organized a party and a rock and roll band called the MC5 performed. At first, the Sinclairs, who were jazz fans, disliked the MC5, but soon they recognized their creativity and became fans. John Sinclair became their manager, and Leni Sinclair started photographing their performances. Her photos of the band have been described as "iconic".

When the Grande Ballroom opened on October 6, 1966, Leni Sinclair teamed up with poster artist Gary Grimshaw and formed the Magic Veil Light Company to produce psychedelic light shows during rock and roll performances.

On January 24, 1967, the Detroit Artists Workshop was again raided, along with several other locations. Both John and Leni Sinclair were arrested, as were 54 other people. Although most of those arrested were never charged, John Sinclair faced ten years in prison for a third marijuana conviction. Released on bail, he set out with Leni and Grimshaw to reorganize the workshop into Trans-Love Energies Unlimited, named after a lyric in a Donovan song. The new group was organized as a "new total cooperative tribal living and working commune" whose stated purpose was to "promote self reliance and tribal responsibility among the artists, craftsmen and other lovers".

Trans-Love's first major event was a Love-in on April 30, 1967 at Belle Isle Park, an island in the Detroit River. The event was peaceful for most of the day, but after members of the Outlaws Motorcycle Club beat a man, a riot started. About 150 police officers dispersed the crowd, clubbing people from horseback. According to Leni Sinclair, who was pregnant at the time, "the police really started the trouble and were blaming us."

Less than three months later, the 1967 Detroit riot broke out resulting in 43 deaths, and the destruction of 2000 buildings, mostly by fire. In the aftermath, Trans-Love Energies provided assistance to many people who had been left homeless by the riot. But the police increased their harassment of the group.

After two fire bombings, ongoing police harassment, and a curfew in Detroit due to the riot that followed the assassination of Martin Luther King Jr., Trans-Love abandoned Detroit and relocated to Ann Arbor, settling into two Victorian homes at 1510 and 1520 Hill Street; 28 people lived in the commune.

== White Panther Party ==
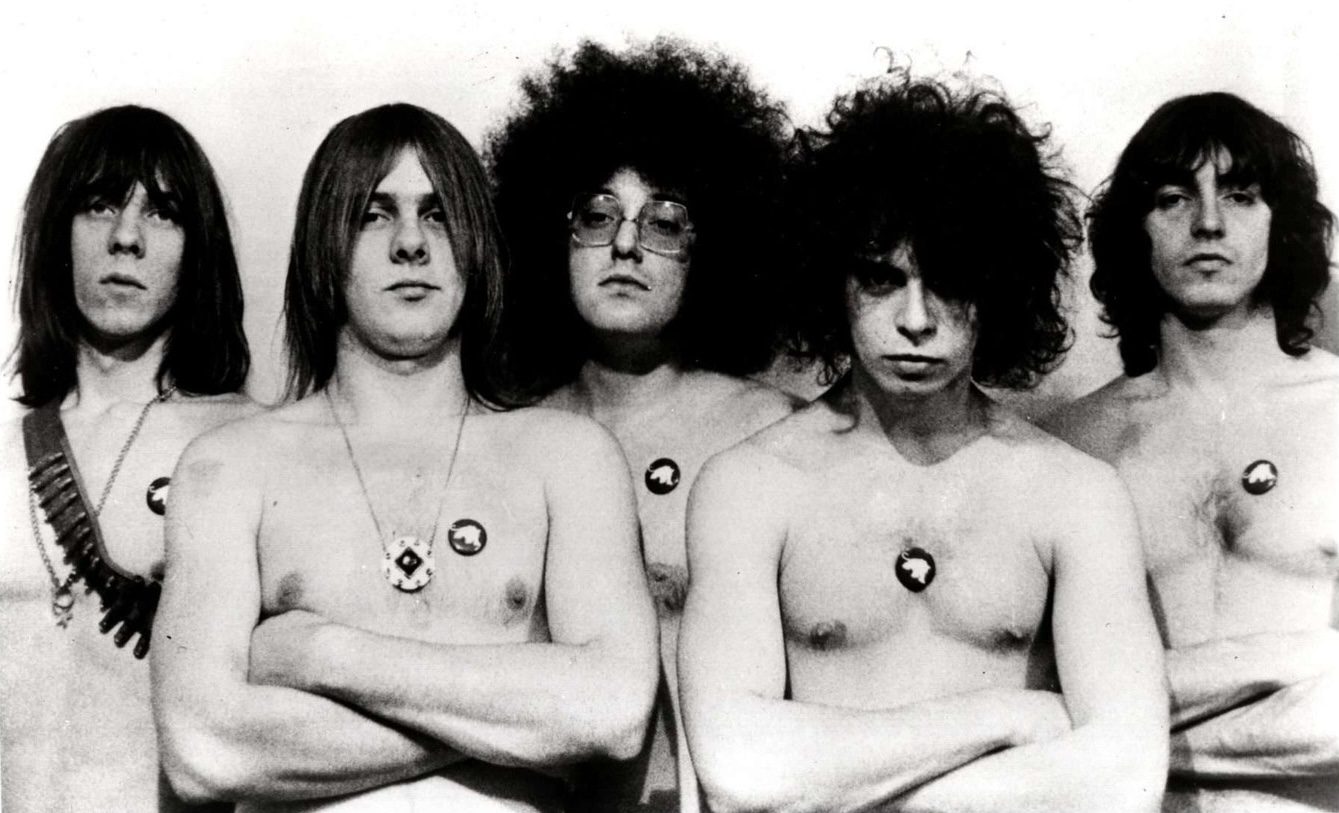
Members of the rock band the MC5 in 1969, wearing White Panther Party buttons. Photo by Leni Sinclair.

On November 1, 1968, the White Panther Party was formed by Leni Sinclair, John Sinclair, and Pun Plamondon. The organization pledged to support the Black Panther Party and had a ten-point platform that included "total assault on the culture", demanding the end of money, free food, free medical care, free access to information technology, the end of corporate rule, freeing all prisoners, freeing conscripted soldiers, and freedom from "phony leaders". She became its "Minister of Education."

== Later years ==
The Sinclairs legally separated in 1977 and divorced in 1988. In the spring of 1979, they donated their papers to the Bentley Historical Library at the University of Michigan. John Sinclair would remarry and later die in 2024. Leni Sinclair continued doing photography and lived in New Orleans for several years before returning to Detroit in the 1990s. In 1998, a retrospective of her work was held at the Museum Boijmans Van Beuningen in Rotterdam.

She has written two books, The Detroit Jazz Who's Who and Detroit Rocks! A Pictorial History of Motor City Rock and Roll 1965-1975.

In January 2016, Sinclair was selected as the year's Kresge Eminent Artist, a $50,000 award given by the Kresge Foundation.

Between Feb 5 2021 and May 2, 2021, MoCAD Museum of Contemporary Art Detroit exhibited the first museum show dedicated to Leni's photography and published a major monograph on Leni Sinclair's photographic work: Motor City Underground: Leni Sinclair Photographs 1963-1978, this 408 page photographic and biographical history was edited by Cary Loren and Lorraine Wild, and served as an exhibition catalog for her show at MoCAD.

== Leni Sinclair Archive ==
In 2013, Sinclair received a grant from the John S. and James L. Knight Foundation for a one-year project to create a public archive of the previously "disorganized negatives" of 57,000 photos of the Detroit music scene that she has taken over a half century period.
