= Bennis v. Michigan =

- Supreme Court of the United States

Argued November 29, 1995 Decided March 4, 1996
- Full case name: Tina B. Bennis v. Michigan
- Citations: 516 U.S. 442 (more) 116 S. Ct. 994; 134 L. Ed. 2d 68

Case history
- Prior: Mich ex rel. Prosecutor v. Bennis, 447 Mich. 719, 527 N.W.2d 483 (1994)

Holding
- The forfeiture order did not offend the Due Process Clause of the Fourteenth Amendment or the Takings Clause of the Fifth Amendment.

Court membership
- Chief Justice William Rehnquist Associate Justices John P. Stevens · Sandra Day O'Connor; Antonin Scalia · Anthony Kennedy; David Souter · Clarence Thomas; Ruth Bader Ginsburg · Stephen Breyer

Case opinions
- Majority: Rehnquist, joined by O'Connor, Scalia, Thomas, Ginsburg
- Concurrence: Thomas
- Concurrence: Ginsburg
- Dissent: Stevens, joined by Souter, Breyer
- Dissent: Kennedy

Bennis v. Michigan, 516 U.S. 442 (1996), was a decision by the United States Supreme Court, which held that the innocent owner defense is not constitutionally mandated by Fourteenth Amendment Due Process in cases of civil forfeiture.

== Background ==
Tina B. Bennis was a joint owner, with her husband, of an automobile. Detroit police arrested her husband, John Bennis, after observing him engaged in a sexual act with a prostitute in the automobile while it was parked on a Detroit city street. In declaring the automobile forfeit as a public nuisance under Michigan's statutory abatement scheme, the trial court permitted no offset for petitioner's interest despite her lack of knowledge of her husband's activity. The Michigan Court of Appeals reversed but was, in turn, reversed by the Michigan Supreme Court, which concluded, among other things, that Michigan's failure to provide an innocent owner defense was without federal constitutional consequence under this Court's decisions.

== See also ==
- List of United States Supreme Court cases, volume 516
- List of United States Supreme Court cases
- Lists of United States Supreme Court cases by volume
- List of United States Supreme Court cases by the Rehnquist Court
- Nebraska v. One 1970 2-Door Sedan Rambler (Gremlin)

== Sources ==
- Beatty, M. E. (1996). "Bennis v. Michigan: The Supreme Court Clings to Precedent and Denies Innocent Owners a Defense to Forfeiture". Mercer Law Review. 48: 1265. ISSN 0025-987X.
- Ingram, R. T. (1996). "The Crime of Property: Bennis v. Michigan and the Excessive Fines Clause". Denver University Law Review. 74: 293. ISSN 0883-9409.
- Levy, Robert A.; Mellor, William H. (2008). "Asset Forfeiture Without Due Process". The Dirty Dozen: How Twelve Supreme Court Cases Radically Expanded Government and Eroded Freedom. New York: Sentinel. pp. 143–154. ISBN 978-1-59523-050-8.
