= Michael Quatro =

American singer-songwriter

Michael Quatro (born 12 June 1943, Detroit, Michigan, US) is a keyboard player and songwriter who has released eleven albums since 1972. He specializes in keyboard-driven progressive rock. He is also known for his work in the late 1960s and early 1970s as a booking agent and festival promoter, organizing and promoting the 1969 Detroit Black Arts Festival, the 1970 Cincinnati Pop Festival, and the 1970 Cincinnati Summer Pop Festival, the latter of which was broadcast on television as "Midsummer Rock".

== Career ==
Quatro began taking classical piano lessons at 6 or 7 years old. He was known as a child prodigy and studied under Mischa Kottler. As an adolescent he performed with the Detroit Symphony Orchestra and would perform regularly on The Lawrence Welk Show. Later he began to mix his classical influences with rock music in the Mike Quatro Jam Band (also known as the Michael Quatro Jam Band), and was known as "The King of Rock and Bach", and the "Bach of Rock". His classically-based, keyboard-driven progressive rock style has been compared to that of Keith Emerson and Rick Wakeman, and Wakeman was influenced musically by Quatro's debut album Paintings during the recording of The Six Wives of Henry VIII. Wakeman informed Quatro that he was his favorite keyboardist during this time, and used some of his Moog synthesizer lines on the album. Quatro's rock albums are symphonic and progressive, and feature elements of psychedelia as well as pop-oriented tunes influenced by the Detroit sound. He has been described as a "whirling dervish at the keyboards" and "a melange of Liberace and Rick Wakeman". Quatro was described as "the only American with enough chops on the keyboard to be considered progressive" by the Columbia Spectator. Quatro's music gained popularity in Detroit, Michigan, where he was popular in clubs and received airplay on FM radio.

Quatro is also notable for pioneering the modern usage of the term "jam band" in the psychedelic rock and hippie rock festival scene. His group Michael Quatro Jam Band, used the term as early as 1970 on promotional materials for live shows including on promotional materials for the 1970 Cincinnati Summer Pop Festival, as well as their two albums which were released in 1972 and 1973. True to the "jam band" form, Quatro is known for his extended passages and improvisation, often recording his tracks in one take. The term "jam band" had been previously used in the jazz community, of which Quatro was undoubtedly aware as his father Art Quatro was a jazz bandleader. However, the Michael Quatro Jam Band is the first known example of a band and promoter capitalizing on the term "jam band" in its modern sense, which has since become synonymous with psychedelic rock festivals.

The Mike Quatro Jam Band's 1972 album Paintings contains the single "Circus (What I Am)", which reached No. 8 on Billboard magazine's Bubbling Under Hot 100 Singles chart and No. 91 on the Cash Box Top 100 Singles chart. The album included a cover version of the King Crimson song "The Court of the Crimson King" sung by Quatro and featuring Ted Nugent on guitar. Paintings also included Quatro's rock adaptation of Rachmaninoff's "Prelude in C-sharp Minor", entitled "Rachmaninoff's Prelude". Lead vocals on the album were handled by John Finely, formerly of Rhinoceros. Quatro's sister Suzi Quatro co-wrote the single "Circus (What I Am)" and "Each Day I Want You More" with Michael, and his sisters Patti Quatro and Nancy Quatro contributed backing vocals to the album. The album cover features psychedelic artwork by artist Brad Johannsen, who also did album covers for Lighthouse. The Canadian Press reviewed Paintings as "ingenious, esoteric, and infectious", and Billboard magazine described it as a "celestial calliope of diverse and lovely components...a uniquely enjoyable album." Mike Quatro Jam Band debuted the release of Paintings with a live performance of the album with the Kansas City Symphony on February 13, 1972.

The Michael Quatro Jam Band's 1973 album Look Deeply Into the Mirror also featured guitarist Ted Nugent on the song "Won't You Come Away". Michael's sister, The Pleasure Seekers/Cradle guitarist Patti Quatro, wrote the song "Won't You Come Away", and co-wrote every other song on the album except for "Prelude in Ab Crazy", which was written by Michael. Aside from Ted Nugent's contribution, Patti played all the guitar on the album. After co-producing Look Deeply Into the Mirror with Michael, Patti Quatro left the Michael Quatro Jam Band to join Fanny. The album cover for Look Deeply Into the Mirror was also done by artist Brad Johannsen.

Quatro's third album, In Collaboration with the Gods, was the first album he recorded as a solo artist, and featured Rick Derringer on guitar and Flo & Eddie (Mark Volman and Howard Kaylan) from The Turtles on vocals. In Collaboration with the Gods was reviewed by The Sydney Morning Herald as "a schematic masterpiece", by The Pittsburgh Press as "a bountifully imaginative, well-executed piece", and by the Spokane Daily Chronicle as "imaginative rock".

Quatro's 1976 album Dancers, Romancers, Dreamers & Schemers features the track "Pure Chopin", a rock adaptation of Frédéric Chopin's "Nocturne in E♭ major, Op. 9, No. 2" which was reviewed as "spirited; melodic; romantic, and...awe-inspiring". The track "Rollerbach" features Ray Parker Jr. on guitar, and Quatro's "Adagio" features Bobby Womack on guitar. David Surkamp of the progressive rock band Pavlov's Dog contributes narration vocals on the track "Ancient Ones". Patti Quatro sings harmony vocals on the album. The album also features the track "Stripper", which has been heavily sampled in hip-hop by artists including Amerie feat. Nas, and the Madd Rapper, among others.

Quatro's 1977 album Gettin' Ready features guitar from Ray Parker Jr., Jerry Cole of The Wrecking Crew, and Patti Quatro. Gettin' Ready features contributions from studio musician Don Randi, also of the Wrecking Crew, who did the horn and string arrangements and played additional keyboards. Michael Boddicker did the synthesizer programming, Reggie McBride played bass, and background vocals were contributed by Susie Allanson and Patti Quatro, among others. Gettin' Ready features a cover version of the Phil Lynott's Thin Lizzy song "Wild One", and a cover of the Russ Ballard song "I'm Winning" several years before Santana had a hit with it.

Quatro has sold 20 million records worldwide.

Quatro is an independent entertainment executive and the older brother of musician Suzi Quatro. When record producer Mickie Most was in Detroit, Michael persuaded him to see Cradle featuring his sisters Suzi, Patti, Arlene and Nancy, as he was their manager at the time. Most waited for Cradle to break up before signing Suzi as a solo act. As a result, she became the first female bass player to become a major rock star. After Cradle broke up, Patti Quatro joined the Mike Quatro Jam Band as guitarist and co-produced his 1973 album Look Deeply into the Mirror. Quatro was also the booking agent for MC5.

Quatro is still making music and as of 2010 was still promoting Detroit musical acts.

== Discography ==
=== Albums ===
- 1972: Paintings (Evolution) as Mike Quatro Jam Band
- 1973: Look Deeply into the Mirror (Evolution) as Michael Quatro Jam Band
- 1975: In Collaboration with the Gods (United Artists) - AUS #73
- 1976: Dancers, Romancers, Dreamers, & Schemers (United Artists)
- 1977: Gettin' Ready (Prodigal Records, a Motown label)
- 1980: The Selections Of Paintings (Koala, a Tennessee label) 1979 re-recordings of the Painting album
- 1980: Into The Mirror (Koala) 1979 re-recordings of the Look Deeply Into The Mirror album
- 1980: Selections of Dancers, Romancers (Koala) 1979 re-recordings of the Dancers, Romancers, Dreamers & Schemers album
- 1980: It's Only A Love Song (Koala) as Mike Quatro; remixed reissue of Gettin' Ready
- 1980: Mirage (Koala) as Mike Quatro, mini-album of new songs; also released as Michael Quatro Band with added previously released tracks (Quality Records)
- 1981: The Best of Mike Quatro (Koala) as Mike Quatro
- 1981: Bottom Line (Spector International Records)
- 1995: Vision (Quatrophonic Music USA)
- 2004: Romantic/Classical/New Age (Quatrophonic Music USA)
- 2005: The Shadow of the King (Reiwan)
- 2006: Heavenward (Reiwan)

=== Singles ===
- 1972: "Circus (What I Am)"/"Time Spent in Dreams"
- 1973: "Natural Way"
- 1973: "Tomorrows"
- 1995: "Song of the Sea"
