= Pun Plamondon =

American activist (1945–2023)

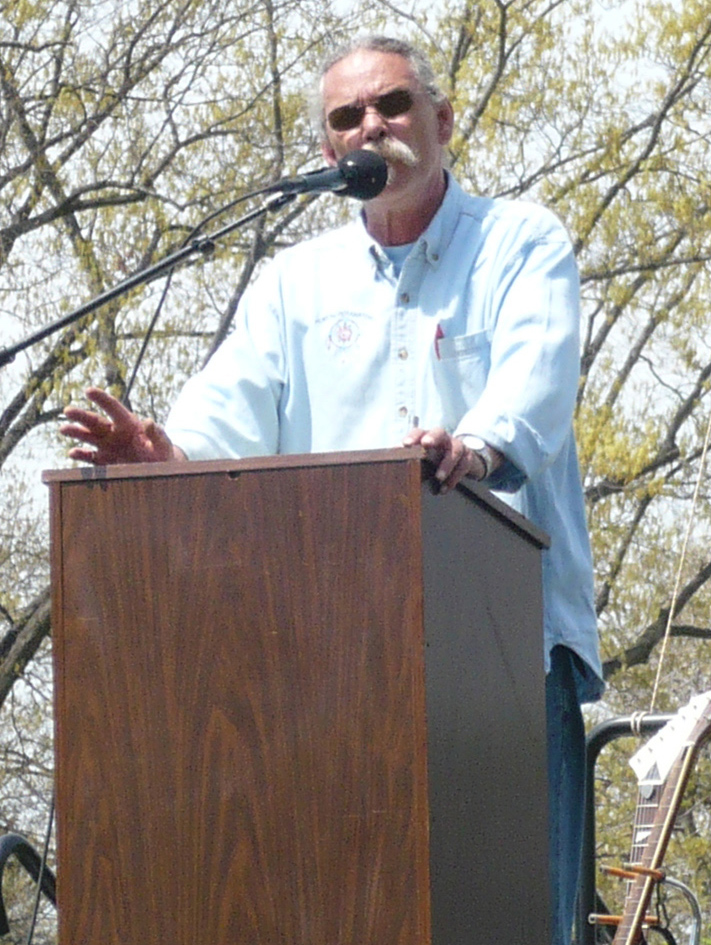
- Plamondon speaking at Kent State University in May 2009
- Born: Lawrence Robert Plamondon; April 27, 1945; Traverse City, Michigan, U.S.
- Died: March 6, 2023 (aged 77); Barry County, Michigan, U.S.
- Known for: Founder of the White Panther Party

Lawrence Robert "Pun" Plamondon (April 27, 1945 – March 6, 2023) was an American activist, known for being a 1960s left-wing activist who helped found the White Panther Party. He was the first hippie to be listed on the FBI's Ten Most Wanted Fugitives list due to his alleged participation in a bombing, though charges were ultimately dropped due to high-level governmental agency misconduct — rejecting warrantless interception of phone calls based on a claim of "national security" — an issue finally decided on appeal by the Supreme Court of the United States.

== Biography ==
Plamondon was born at Traverse City State Hospital in Traverse City, Michigan, on April 27, 1945. His birth father was half-Odawa and his birth mother was part-Ojibwe, which he was unaware of early in life. (Note: "The FBI psych profile was part of a pre-sentence report submitted by the probation and parole department. I was fearful of going back to the penitentiary; after all, my record didn’t look good. We were on a recess from the sentencing proceedings and had a limited time to peruse the entire pre-sentence report. The FBI is thorough; they did my genealogy for me and found the records of my biological parents showing they were mixed-blood Ottawa and Ojibwa. I filed the information away, but didn’t do anything with it until some 10 years later when I was trying to get off drugs and alcohol.") A local couple adopted him and gave him his name, Lawrence Robert Plamondon. Plamondon had a troubled childhood and left home as a teenager.

At the age of 21, Plamondon was in Detroit, Michigan, in 1967, when the protests against the Vietnam War and a riot occurred. Making sandals during the day and smoking marijuana in the evening, he was soon meeting with John Sinclair.

In 1968, Plamondon and a few friends moved to Ann Arbor, Michigan, where they established a commune at 1510 Hill Street. With John Sinclair, they founded the White Panther Party, which supported the goals of the Black Panther Party. He was indicted for bombing a CIA office in Ann Arbor, Michigan, on September 29, 1968. Changing his appearance, he went underground and fled to San Francisco, Seattle, New York, Germany, Italy, and finally to Algeria. In May 1970, he was listed on the FBI's Ten Most Wanted Fugitives list. After a few months he covertly returned to the United States. In July 1970, Plamondon was discovered and arrested after being stopped for littering. He was the 307th fugitive to be placed on the FBI's Ten Most Wanted fugitives list and spent nearly three months on the list before being captured.

While waiting trial and after being convicted, he spent 32 months in federal prison. During the trial, the government admitted to wiretapping without a warrant. The case went to the United States Supreme Court and was decided in United States v. U.S. District Court, also now famously known as the Keith Case, which held that not even the invocation of "national security" by the president of the United States could insulate illegal activity from Constitutional rights to privacy (407 U.S. 297 (1972)). The charges were dismissed. (Note: "His Supreme Court challenge stopped the Nixon Administration from wiretapping domestic dissidents without a warrant. ... he [was] President Pro Tem of CURR, the Congress of Unrepentant Radicals.")

He was indicted and convicted of an alleged terrorist bombing of a covert CIA office. That matter involved substantial litigation – his case against the government for illegal domestic surveillance was successfully pleaded to the US Supreme Court in United States v. U.S. District Court (1972). It took the form of a Writ of Mandamus, which was won at the United States Court of Appeals for the Sixth Circuit and an appeal on certiorari to the Supreme Court. The wiretap evidence was suppressed, and the criminal case dropped.

Later, Plamondon found work as a roadie, driving equipment trucks for rock bands including Kiss and Foreigner.

Plamondon lived in Barry County, Michigan, with his wife Patricia Lynn. He was a self-employed carpenter. He told American Indian stories to young children at schools, libraries, museums, and summer camps. His home was a gathering place for American Indian celebrations.

== Death and memorial ==
Plamondon died on March 6, 2023, in Barry County at the age of 77. In 2023, John Sinclair, with whom he helped found the White Panthers party, did a eulogy at the tribute for Plamondon. Sinclair said, “He was a brilliant character,” but Sinclair went on at such length about his own contribution — so much so that he was interrupted and reminded that 'this is about Pun.' On June 12, 2023, the Ann Arbor Observer noted:

"June 16, 2023: Mike Smith & the Cadillac Cowboys.
Veteran local country band, led by singer-guitarist Smith, whose repertoire includes classic country, western swing, and boogie-woogie. This show is dedicated to the memory of the late Pun Plamondon, and during the break speakers reminisce about the life and accomplishments this 60s activist, cofounder of the Ann Arbor-based White Panther Party."

== See also ==
- List of fugitives from justice who disappeared

== Writings ==
Plamondon's autobiography:

- Plamondon, Pun (2004). Lost from the Ottawa: The Story of the Journey Back. Victoria, B.C: Trafford. ISBN 1-4120-2265-7. Catalogue #04-0093.
