= White Panther Party =

American political collective

- Abbreviation: WPP
- Founder: Pun Plamondon; Leni Sinclair; John Sinclair
- Founded: November 1, 1968
- Dissolved: c. 1980s
- Headquarters: Ann Arbor, Michigan
- Ideology: Anti-racism; Anti-capitalism
- Political position: Far-left
- National affiliation: Rainbow Coalition

The White Panthers were an American anti-racist and anti-capitalist political collective founded in November 1968 by Pun Plamondon, Leni Sinclair, and John Sinclair. It was started in response to an interview where Huey P. Newton, co-founder of the Black Panther Party, was asked what White people could do to support the Black Panthers. Newton replied that they could form a White Panther Party. The counterculture era group took the name and dedicated its energies to "cultural revolution.” John Sinclair made every effort to ensure that the White Panthers were not mistaken for a white supremacist group, responding to such claims with "quite the contrary." The party worked with many ethnic minority rights groups in the Rainbow Coalition.

== Michigan years ==
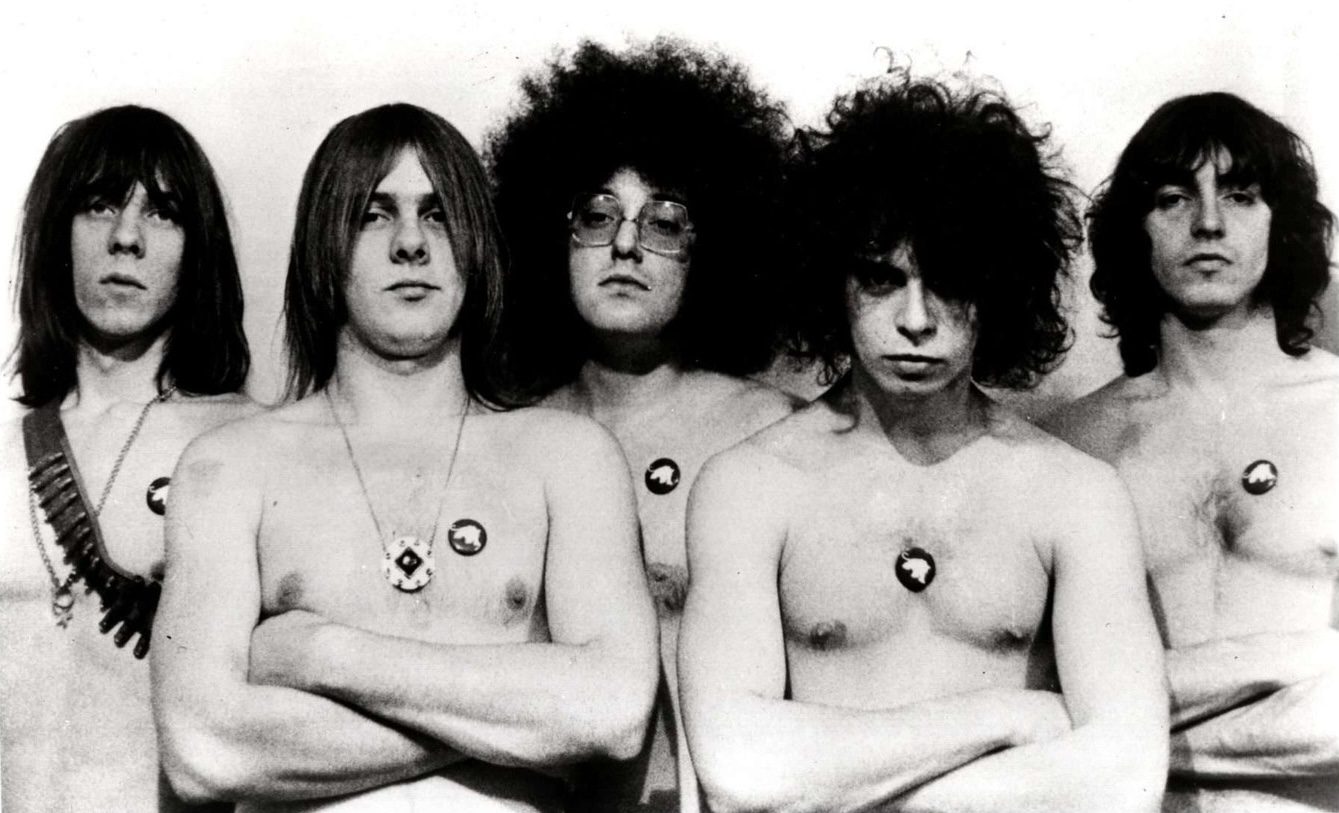
Members of the rock band the MC5 in 1969, wearing White Panther Party buttons. Photo by Leni Sinclair.

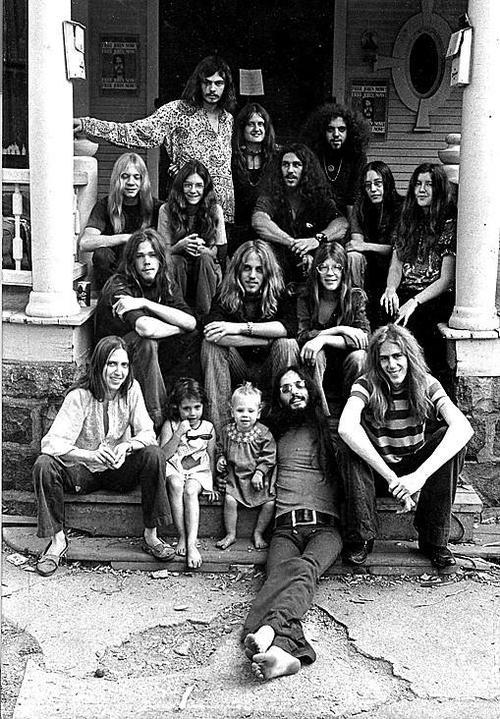
The White Panther Party in Ann Arbor.

The group was most active in Detroit and Ann Arbor, Michigan, and included the proto-punk band MC5, which John Sinclair managed for several years before he was incarcerated. From a general ideological perspective, Plamondon and Sinclair defined the White Panthers as "fighting for a clean planet and the freeing of political prisoners." The White Panthers added other elements such as advocating "rock 'n roll, dope, sex in the streets, and the abolishing of capitalism." Yippie co-founder Abbie Hoffman praised the WPP in Steal This Book and Woodstock Nation, and John Sinclair often referred to himself as a Yippie as well.

The group emerged from the Detroit Artists Workshop, a radical arts collective founded in 1964 near Wayne State University. Among its concerns was the legalization of marijuana; John Sinclair had several arrests for possession. It aligned itself with radical politics, claiming that the 12th Street Riot was justified under the political and economic conditions in Detroit.

Plamondon was indicted with John Sinclair in connection to the bombing of a Central Intelligence Agency office in Ann Arbor on September 29, 1968, a year after the founding of the group. Upon hearing on the left-wing alternative radio station WABX that he had been indicted, he fled the U.S. for Europe and Africa, spending time in Algeria with exiled Black Panther Eldridge Cleaver. After secretly re-entering the country, and on his way to a safe house in northern Michigan, he was arrested in a routine traffic stop, joining John Sinclair, who had been sentenced to nine and a half years in jail for violating Michigan's marijuana possession laws, in prison. Plamondon was convicted and in prison when Sinclair was released on bond in 1971, while appeals in his case were being heard. Sinclair's unexpected release came two days after a large "Free John" benefit concert, with performances from John Lennon, Yoko Ono, Bob Seger, and Stevie Wonder, which was held at the University of Michigan's Crisler Arena.

== Legal reforms ==
The group had a direct role in two important legal decisions. A landmark U.S. Supreme Court decision in 1972 quashed Plamondon's conviction and destroyed the case against John Sinclair. The court ruled that warrantless wiretapping was unlawful under the U.S. Constitution, even when national security, as defined by the executive branch, was at risk. The White Panthers had been charged with conspiring to destroy government property, and evidence used to convict Plamondon was acquired through wiretaps, not submitted to judicial approval. The case U.S. vs. U.S. District Court (Plamondon et al.), 407 U.S. 297, commonly known as the Keith Case, held that the Fourth Amendment shielded private speech from surveillance unless a warrant had been granted, and that the "warrant procedure would not frustrate the legitimate purposes of domestic security searches." The judgment freed Plamondon, yet John Sinclair was free only on bond, fighting his possession conviction. In 1972, the Michigan Supreme Court ruled in the People v. Sinclair, 387 Mich. 91, 194 N.W.2d 878 (1972) that Michigan's classification of marijuana was unconstitutional, in effect decriminalizing possession until a new law conforming to the ruling was passed by the Michigan Legislature a week later. Sinclair was freed, but the cumulative effects of the imprisonment marked the end of the White Panther Party in Michigan, which, while Sinclair and Plamondon were in prison, renamed itself the Rainbow People's Party. The Rainbow People's Party, headquartered in Ann Arbor, disbanded in 1973.

== Portland ==
The headquarters of the White Panthers in Portland, Oregon were raided by the Federal Bureau of Investigation on December 5, 1970. Two members of the group were arrested and accused of throwing a molotov cocktail through the window of a local Selective Service office.

== San Francisco ==
White Panther Party chapters in San Francisco, Marin and Berkeley remained active into the 1980s. The WPP ran a successful 'Food Conspiracy' that provided groceries to about 5,000 Bay Area residents at low cost, due to bulk buying and minimum markup. The White Panthers held People's Ballroom in the Park concerts in Golden Gate Park. In 1983, angry because then-Mayor of San Francisco Dianne Feinstein proposed to ban handguns in the city, the San Francisco White Panthers mounted a successful petition drive that forced Feinstein into a recall election, which she won with about 82% of the vote.

== United Kingdom ==
Author and anarchist Mick Farren, a leader of the United Kingdom Underground, later founded the White Panthers UK, which was one of the organizations involved in the tearing down of the outer walls surrounding Isle of Wight Festival 1970.

== White Panther Statement ==
In November 1968, Fifth Estate published the "White Panther State/meant". This manifesto, emulating the Black Panthers, ended with a ten-point program:

1. We want freedom. We want the power for all people to determine our own destinies.
2. We want justice. We want an immediate and total end to all cultural and political repression of the people by the vicious pig power structure and their mad dog lackies the police, courts and military. We want the end of all police and military violence against the people all over the world right now!
3. We want a free world economy based on the free exchange of energy and materials and the end of money.
4. We want free access to all information media and to all technology for all the people.
5. We want a free educational system, utilizing the best procedures and machinery our modern technology can produce, that will teach each man, woman and child on earth exactly what each needs to know to survive and grow into his or her full human potential.
6. We want to free all structures from corporate rule and turn the buildings over to the people at once!
7. We want free time and space for all humans—dissolve all unnatural boundaries!
8. We want the freedom of all prisoners held in federal, state, county or city jails and prisons since the so-called legal system in America makes it impossible for any man to obtain a fair and impartial trial by a jury of his peers.
9. We want the freedom of all people who are held against their will in the conscripted armies of the oppressors throughout the world.
10. We want free land, free food, free shelter, free clothing, free music, free medical care, free education, free media, EVERYTHING FREE FOR EVERYBODY!

The ten-point program and "White Panther State/meant" were also published in the Ann Arbor Sun, which was a newspaper founded by John Sinclair in November 1968. The newspaper was originally called the Detroit Warren-Forrest Sun before being renamed the Ann Arbor Sun when Trans-Love Energies moved to Ann Arbor in 1968. The organization, founded by John Sinclair, his wife Leni Arndt Sinclair and artist Gary Grimshaw in 1967, set up shop at 1510 and 1520 Hill St, where the Ann Arbor Sun was produced and edited by the members of the group. On July 28, 1969, the Ann Arbor Sun printed a revised copy of the White Panther's ten-point program.

The newspaper was considered the mouthpiece of the White Panther Party for quite some time before transitioning to an independent publication that spread views on local issues, left-wing politics, music, and the arts. Finally in 1976, the publication of the Ann Arbor Sun was suspended indefinitely.

== See also ==
- Black Panther Party
- COINTELPRO
- Gary Grimshaw
- New Left
- Yippies
