= Savage Grace (Michigan rock band) =

American rock band

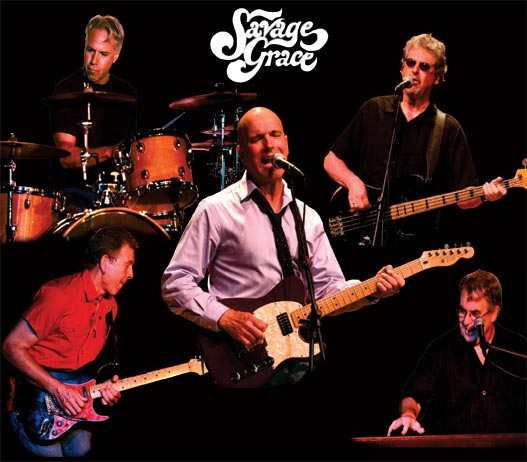
- Savage Grace, 2012

Background information
- Origin: Detroit, Michigan, U.S.
- Genres: Progressive rock
- Years active: 1968–1972
- Labels: Reprise
- Members: Al Jacquez; Mark Gougeon; Mark Tomorsky; Frankie Charboneaux; Jim King
- Past members: Original members: Ron Koss; John Seanor; Larry Zack; Al Jacquez (See: full listing)

Savage Grace was an American rock band formed in Detroit, Michigan, in the late 1960s. The band released its self-titled debut album on Reprise in 1970. After moving to Los Angeles the following year, the group released a second album, Savage Grace 2. The band broke up in 1972, reforming in the 1990s until 2004.

== Biography ==
The band's origins trace to the east side of Detroit in the late 1960s. Session guitarist Ron Koss, a self-taught musician who had played locally and recorded with Wilson Pickett, Marv Johnson, and Hank Ballard, joined with keyboardist John Seanor and drummer / percussionist Larry Zack. The trio added Ann Arborite Al Jacquez on lead vocals and bass.

The new band performed throughout the Midwest in clubs, ballrooms, colleges, high schools, and pop festivals, eventually opening for various other acts including Three Dog Night, Procol Harum, Sha Na Na, The Moody Blues, Small Faces and countless others. At one festival, Yes, Soft Machine and Alice Cooper opened for Savage Grace.

The band's first album, eponymously titled Savage Grace, was released in 1970. August 1970 they performed at the Goose Lake International Music Festival. In the fall of 1970, Savage Grace relocated to Los Angeles. Savage Grace 2 was released in May 1971. The group resumed touring with Jimi Hendrix and John Sebastian, but performance opportunities soon began to dwindle.

During the late 1990s Ron Koss and Al Jacquez reunited and teamed up with bassist Mark Gougeon, guitarist Jeff Jones, drummer Bill Gordon, and keyboardist Jim Claire to produce Savage Grace 3 – officially titled One Night in America. The new Savage Grace performed several times until the death of Ron Koss in 2004.

== Line-up ==
=== Current members ===
- Al Jacquez − bass, guitar & vocals
- Mark Gougeon – bass & vocals
- Mark Tomorsky − guitar & vocals
- Frankie Charboneaux − drums
- Jim King − keyboards

=== 1990s members ===
- Ron Koss − guitar & vocals
- Al Jacquez − guitar & vocals
- Mark Gougeon – bass & vocals
- Jeff Jones – guitar
- Bill Gordon – drums
- Jim Claire – keyboards

=== Original members ===
- Ron Koss − guitar & vocals
- Al Jacquez − bass & vocals
- John Seanor − piano, harpsichord
- Larry Zack − drums, percussion

== Discography ==
=== Albums ===
- Savage Grace (1970)
- Savage Grace 2 (1971)
- One Night in America
