= List of United States Supreme Court cases, volume 407 =

This is a list of all United States Supreme Court cases from volume 407 of the United States Reports:

Case name	Citation	Date decided
The Bremen	407 U.S. 1	1972
Argersinger v. Hamlin	407 U.S. 25	1972
Fuentes v. Shevin	407 U.S. 67	1972
Colten v. Kentucky	407 U.S. 104	1972
James v. Strange	407 U.S. 128	1972
Adams v. Williams	407 U.S. 143	1972
Moose Lodge No. 107 v. Irvis	407 U.S. 163	1972
Taylor v. McKeithen	407 U.S. 191	1972
Flower v. United States	407 U.S. 197	1972
Ivan V. v. City of New York	407 U.S. 203	1972
Pennsylvania v. New York (initial filing)	407 U.S. 206	1972
Pennsylvania v. New York (decision)	407 U.S. 223	1972
Mitchum v. Foster	407 U.S. 225	1972
McNeil v. Patuxent Inst.	407 U.S. 245	1972
Flood v. Kuhn	407 U.S. 258	1972
United States v. United States District Court	407 U.S. 297	1972
Shadwick v. Tampa	407 U.S. 345	1972
Murel v. Crim. Ct.	407 U.S. 355	1972
Turner v. Arkansas	407 U.S. 366	1972
Milton v. Wainwright	407 U.S. 371	1972
Pipefitters v. United States	407 U.S. 385	1972
Wright v. Council of Emporia	407 U.S. 451	1972
United States v. Scotland Neck City Bd. of Educ.	407 U.S. 484	1972
Peters v. Kiff	407 U.S. 493	1972
Barker v. Wingo	407 U.S. 514	1972
Cent. Hardware Co. v. NLRB	407 U.S. 539	1972
Lloyd Corp. v. Tanner	407 U.S. 551	1972
