= Stolen valor =

Stolen valor or stolen valour is a term for the behavior of military impostors: individuals who lie about serving in the military or the extent of their military service.

Stolen valor may also refer to:

- Stolen Valor, a 1998 book
- Stolen Valor Act of 2005, an act of the US Congress
- Stolen Valor Act of 2013, an act of the US Congress
- "Stolen Valor" (NCIS: New Orleans), a 2014 television episode
