= False statement of fact =

US constitutional law on false assertions

In United States constitutional law, false statements of fact are assertions, which are ostensibly facts, that are false. Such statements are not always protected by the First Amendment. Often, this is due to laws against defamation, that is, making statements that harm the reputation of another. In those cases, freedom of speech comes into conflict with the right to privacy. Because it is almost impossible for someone to be absolutely sure that what they say (in public) is true, a party who makes a false claim isn't always liable. Whether such speech is protected depends on the situation. The standards of such protection have evolved over time from a body of Supreme Court rulings.

One of the landmark cases that established such standards was New York Times Co. v. Sullivan (1964). In that case, the court ruled that statements about public officials must be given more protection in order to avoid squelching public debate. Similar protections were later expanded to statements about public figures (not just officials), and matters of "public concern" (including those involving private parties). Other examples of false statements of fact that do not receive First Amendment protection include false advertising, as in Lexmark International, Inc. v. Static Control Components, Inc. (2014) and POM Wonderful LLC v. Coca-Cola Co. (2014), and commercial speech that includes misleading statements as in Central Hudson Gas & Electric Corp. v. Public Service Commission (1980).

Section 1001(a) of Title 18 of the United States Code states:

(a) Except as otherwise provided in this section, whoever, in any matter within the jurisdiction of the executive, legislative, or judicial branch of the Government of the United States, knowingly and willfully—

1. falsifies, conceals, or covers up by any trick, scheme, or device a material fact;
2. makes any materially false, fictitious, or fraudulent statement or representation; or
3. makes or uses any false writing or document knowing the same to contain any materially false, fictitious, or fraudulent statement or entry

shall be fined under this title, imprisoned not more than 5 years or, if the offense involves international or domestic terrorism (as defined in section 2331), imprisoned not more than 8 years, or both. If the matter relates to an offense under chapter 109A, 109B, 110, or 117, or section 1591, then the term of imprisonment imposed under this section shall be not more than 8 years.

In upholding a conviction under Section 1001(a) of Title 18 in Bryson v. United States (1969), the Supreme Court stated:

Our legal system provides methods for challenging the Government's right to ask questions—lying is not one of them.

== Overview of the legal rule ==
=== Theoretical basis for exception ===
The United States Supreme Court first articulated the basis for excluding false statements of fact from First Amendment protection in Gertz v. Robert Welch, Inc. (1974). In that case, a monthly newspaper was sued by a policeman's attorney. The newspaper "contained serious inaccuracies" about the attorney; namely, that he was supporting the police system as a goal to entrench a Communist conspiracy in the United States. They held that a civil jury award against the newspaper was constitutional because "there is no constitutional value in false statements of fact". Justice Powell, in writing the decision of the Court reasoned that false statements do not "advance society's interest in 'uninhibited, robust, and wide-open debate'". Even though he conceded that some false statements were inevitable, that did not mean that a system of liability meant to deter such behavior was impermissible. Society had some interest in ensuring that debate covered truthful matters, as a key element of public participation in a democracy.

=== Basic substantive rule ===
The legal rule itself – how to apply this exception – is complicated, as it is often dependent on who said the statement and which actor it was directed towards. The analysis is thus different if the government or a public figure is the target of the false statement (where the speech may get more protection) than a private individual who is being attacked over a matter of their private life. Thus, a key starting point in the analysis will discuss the 'manner' and 'context' in which the statements were made.

Professor Eugene Volokh of UCLA Law characterizes this context analysis as divided into five different areas. First, false statements of fact can lead to civil liability if they are "said with a sufficiently culpable mental state". This possibly includes conscious lies about military service. The second category is a subset of the first: knowingly false statements (deliberate lies). This includes things like libel and slander. These sorts of statements are specifically punishable because they contain malice. A third category are "negligently" false statements, which may "lead to [some] liability". A fourth included set includes statements that only have a "provable false factual connotation" – that is, implicit statements of fact. The example Volokh uses is the statement that "Joe deserves to die" which in the context of a murder could be made to be a factual statement.

The fifth category is one that is not as firmly set by precedent: false statements, even deliberate lies, against the government may be protected. While some "seditious libel" may be able to be punished, political statements are likely protected.

=== Remedies ===
Punitive damages are sometimes available against an individual who made a public false statement of fact. Criminal liability, although uncommon, can be made although they are usually subject to the same limitations imposed on civil suits in terms of elements to be proven.

== Categories of analysis ==
=== Public officials/public concern ===
False statements that are on matters of public concern and that defame public figures are unprotected if they are made with "actual malice", which is defined as "with knowledge that it was false or with reckless disregard of whether it was false or not". The "actual malice" test comes from the Supreme Court's decision New York Times v. Sullivan (1964). That case concerned an allegation of libel by L.B. Sullivan, a supervisor of the Montgomery, Alabama police department. Sullivan argued that a full-page advertisement in the New York Times incorrectly asserted that his police department let civil rights violations against blacks occur. The Court held that even if the advertisement was incorrect, the fact that there was no intent to harm Sullivan by the newspaper ("actual malice") meant that the lawsuit could not proceed. This specific standard of mens rea is specifically to be used in cases where such speech comments on a matter of public concern.

The basis for this ruling was the Court's fear that "a rule compelling the critic of official conduct to guarantee the truth of all his factual assertions" would lead to "self-censorship". This determination altered the theory of the 'false statements' free speech exception. Even if a false statement generally would be harmful for public discourse, the Court quoted John Stuart Mill in arguing a false statement in this context would bring "the clearer perception and livelier impression of truth, produced by its collision with error".

==== Definition of public figures ====
The Supreme Court has struggled to define who exactly is a public figure, but over fifty years of cases, a framework has become defined. The first grouping of public figures are government officials. The test of which government figures was articulated in the Court's ruling in Rosenblatt v. Baer (1966). In Rosenblatt, the Court said that government positions subject to this rule were those in which the "public has an independent interest in the qualifications and performance of the person who holds it, beyond the general public interest in the qualifications and performance of all government employees". Additionally, a court must question whether the "employee's position is one which would involve public scrutiny and discussion of the person holding it". Along with government officials, the Supreme Court held in Gertz v. Robert Welch, Inc. (1974) that people who "have assumed an influential role in ordering society" are considered public figures. This is the same for people who have "achieved...pervasive fame or notoriety" or who have "voluntarily injected themselves or been drawn into a particular public controversy". This has even been held to include Jerry Falwell, a major religious figure in the United States.

==== Issues "of public concern" ====
The leading case on what an issue "of public concern" is Dun & Bradstreet v. Greenmoss Builders (1985). In Dun & Bradstreet, the Supreme Court considered whether a credit reporting service which distributed fliers to their only five subscribers qualified as an action of "public concern". As it was "hardly and unlikely to be deterred by incidental state regulation", the Court concluded it did not qualify. This decision did not provide strong guidance on the issue.

This vague area of law in regards to false statements of fact can lead to a variety of arguments over what is relevant or has public importance.

=== Private individuals/public concern ===
In Gertz v. Robert Welch, Inc. (1974), the Supreme Court considered an article published in a magazine published by the John Birch Society. The article contained inaccuracies about a private individual, in this case the attorney for a policeman. The Court held that because plaintiff Gertz had not "thrust himself into the vortex of this public issue", the newspaper could not be freed from liability of their false statements. That standard of being put into the public spotlight was used in Snyder v. Phelps (2010), which permitted false statements about a dead Marine because those comments were in the midst of a public debate about war.

In cases which fall into this category, "actual malice" is the standard for a plaintiff to gain compensation at a trial.

=== Private individuals/private concern ===
The most ambiguous area of analysis for false statements of fact are cases that involve private individuals and speech about a private concern. Most likely, a standard of strict liability would attach to speech under this section. Broadly speaking, this category includes speech that doesn't fit the limits of the "false statements of fact" free speech exception, meaning that such speech is not protected.

== Other cases ==
In Riley v. National Federation of the Blind of North Carolina (1988), the Supreme Court struck down a license requirement and limits on fundraising fees for telemarketers as unconstitutional and not narrowly tailored enough to survive First Amendment scrutiny. But in Illinois ex rel. Madigan v. Telemarketing Associates, Inc. (2003), the Court upheld an Illinois telemarketing anti-fraud law against claims that it was a form of prior restraint, affirming consumer protection against misrepresentation was a valid government interest justifying a free speech exception for false claims made in that context.

The 2012 decision United States v. Alvarez struck down part of the Stolen Valor Act of 2005, which prohibited false claims that a person received a military medal.

== See also ==
- Academic dishonesty
- Data dredging
- Data fabrication
- Errors and omissions excepted
- Errors and omissions insurance
- False advertising
- False light
- Fraud
- Freedom of speech in the United States
- Making false statements
- Misrepresentation
- Perjury
- Scientific misconduct
- United States defamation law
- United States free speech exceptions
- Varsity Blues scandal
