= Stolen Valor Act of 2013 =

US law regarding military awards

- Long title: An Act To amend title 18, United States Code, with respect to fraudulent representations about having received military decorations or medals.
- Enacted by: the 113th United States Congress
- Effective: June 3, 2013

Citations
- Public law: Pub. L. 113–12 (text) (PDF)
- Statutes at Large: 127 Stat. 448

Codification
- Titles amended: 18
- U.S.C. sections amended: 18 U.S.C. § 704: 18 U.S.C. § 704(a) 18 U.S.C. § 704(b) 18 U.S.C. § 704(c)(1) 18 U.S.C. § 704(d)

Legislative history
- Introduced in the House as H.R. 258 by Joe Heck (R–NV) on January 15, 2013; Committee consideration by United States House Committee on the Judiciary, United States House Judiciary Subcommittee on Crime, Terrorism, Homeland Security and Investigations; Passed the House on May 20, 2013 (390–3 Roll Call Vote 161); Passed the Senate on May 22, 2013 (Unanimous consent); Signed into law by President Barack Obama on June 3, 2013

The Stolen Valor Act of 2013 (Pub. L. 113–12 (text) (PDF); H.R. 258) is a United States federal law that was passed by the 113th United States Congress. The law amends the federal criminal code to make it a crime for a person to fraudulently claim to have received a valor award specified in the Act, with the intention of obtaining money, property, or other tangible benefit by convincing another that they received the award.

The law is a revised version of a previous statute with roughly the same name that had been struck down by the Supreme Court of the United States in United States v. Alvarez (2012). In that case, the Supreme Court ruled the arrest and prosecution of a citizen for wearing and claiming to have received unearned military awards, who did so without criminal intent, under the 2005 law violates their constitutional right to freedom of speech.

== Provisions of the bill ==
This summary is based largely on the summary provided by the Congressional Research Service, a public domain source.

The Stolen Valor Act of 2013 amends the federal criminal code to rewrite provisions relating to fraudulent claims about military service to subject to a fine, imprisonment for not more than one year, or both for an individual who, with intent to obtain money, property, or other tangible benefit, fraudulently holds themself out to be a recipient of:

- Medal of Honor
- Distinguished Service Cross
- Navy Cross
- Air Force Cross
- Silver Star
- Purple Heart
- Combat Action Ribbon
- Combat Infantryman's Badge
- Combat Action Badge
- Combat Medical Badge
- Combat Action Medal
- Or any replacement or duplicate medal for such medal as authorized by law.

=== Congressional Budget Office report ===
H.R. 258 makes changes to the current federal offenses relating to fraudulent claims about military service. As a result, the government might be able to pursue cases that it otherwise would not be able to prosecute. CBO expects that H.R. 258 would apply to a relatively small number of additional offenders, however, so any increase in costs for law enforcement, court proceedings, or prison operations would not be significant. Any such costs would be subject to the availability of appropriated funds.

Because those prosecuted and convicted under H.R. 258 could be subject to civil and criminal fines, the federal government might collect additional fines if the legislation is enacted. Civil and criminal fines are recorded as revenues. Criminal fines are deposited in the federal Crime Victims Fund and later spent. CBO expects that any additional revenues and direct spending would not be significant because relatively few cases would likely be affected.

== Procedural history ==
=== House ===
The Stolen Valor Act of 2013 H.R. 258 was introduced by Rep. Joe Heck (R-NV) on January 15, 2013. It was referred to the United States House Committee on the Judiciary and the United States House Judiciary Subcommittee on Crime, Terrorism, Homeland Security and Investigations. On May 20, 2013, the House voted to pass the Stolen Valor Act of 2013 by 390–3 in Roll Call Vote 161.

=== Senate ===
The Stolen Valor Act of 2013 was received in the United States Senate on May 21, 2013. It passed the Senate by unanimous consent on May 22, 2013.

=== Presidential signature ===
The bill was signed into law by President Barack Obama on June 3, 2013.

== Government reactions to Stolen Valor Act legal challenges ==
Justice Anthony Kennedy's opinion in United States v. Alvarez cited that "a Government-created database" is "at least one less speech-restrictive means by which the Government could likely protect the integrity of the military award system." In his view, "were a database accessible through the Internet, it would be easy to verify and expose false claims." In response, President Obama announced the creation of U.S. Military Awards for Valor in July 2012, saying "this week, we will launch a new website, a living memorial, so the American people can see who's been awarded our nation's highest honors . . . because no American hero should ever have their valor stolen." This database and the 2013 revision of the Stolen Valor Act were the Obama administration's dual response to the Alvarez case.

== History of prosecutions ==
As of 2017, there were only two reported arrests and prosecutions under the law, leading at least 22 states to enact their own legislation to criminalize stolen valor amid claims that the federal law was virtually unenforced. Despite claims that violations of the act are rarely prosecuted, there is evidence that convictions are still taking place, although not all are for Medal of Honor claims, nor are all in federal court. In some cases, charges are not explicitly under the Stolen Valor Act, since the same conduct criminalized under the statute is often equally capable of prosecution under regular criminal statutes not involving Stolen Valor.

- In 2016, a federal court in Iowa sentenced a defendant for multiple violations of the Stolen Valor Act.
- In 2016, federal prosecutors in Ohio charged a defendant with violations related to the Stolen Valor Act.
- In 2017, a federal court in Missouri sentenced a defendant for violating the Stolen Valor Act.
- In 2017, a federal court in Texas sentenced a defendant for violating the Stolen Valor Act.
- In 2017, a federal court in Illinois sentenced a defendant for violations related to stolen valor claims.
- In 2018, a Pennsylvania court sentenced a defendant for violations of the PA state statute on stolen valor.
- In 2020, a federal court in Georgia sentenced a defendant for multiple violations of the Stolen Valor Act.
- In 2021, a federal court in Pennsylvania sentenced a defendant for violating the Stolen Valor Act.
- In 2023, a federal court in Texas sentenced a defendant for multiple violations of the Stolen Valor Act.
- In 2023, a federal court in Rhode Island sentenced a defendant for multiple violations of the Stolen Valor Act.
- In 2023, a Wisconsin man was convicted of several crimes at the state level in connection with stolen valor claims.
- In 2024, a federal court in New York sentenced a Canadian man for multiple violations of the Stolen Valor Act.
- In 2024, federal prosecutors in New York charged a woman with violating the Stolen Valor Act.
- In 2024, federal prosecutors in Minnesota charged a man with violating the Stolen Valor Act.

== See also ==
- List of bills in the 113th United States Congress
- List of acts of the 113th United States Congress
- Awards and decorations of the United States military
- Mitchell Paige, Medal of Honor recipient who later tracked imposters
- Stolen Valor, book by B. G. Burkett and Glenna Whitley chronicling phony Vietnam veterans.
- Don Shipley, retired Navy SEAL who exposes fraudulent claims of military service
