= Bloods (book) =

1984 book by Wallace Terry

- Author: Wallace Terry
- Language: English
- Publisher: Random House
- Publication date: June 1984
- Pages: 311
- ISBN: 9780345311979
- Dewey Decimal: 959.704
- LC Class: DS559.5

Bloods: An Oral History of the Vietnam War by Black Veterans is a 1984 book by journalist Wallace Terry. An oral history consisting of 20 interviews conducted with African American veterans of the Vietnam War, Terry spent over a decade trying to get the book published. Upon publication by Random House in 1984, Bloods received wide acclaim and was nominated for a Pulitzer Prize. From its publication to 1990, Terry embarked on a tour discussing the book and his experiences in Vietnam. Bloods was a source of inspiration for the 1995 film Dead Presidents and the 2020 film Da 5 Bloods. The book has been included in educational curriculums on the Vietnam War.

== Background ==
In 1967, American journalist Wallace Terry left for Vietnam, where he became TIME magazine's deputy bureau chief in Saigon and the first Black war correspondent on permanent duty. He authored the cover story “Democracy in the Foxhole”, documenting the experiences of Black soldiers and new racially integrated battalions in the war. During his two-year tour, he covered the Tet Offensive, flew scores of combat missions with American and South Vietnamese pilots, and joined assault troops in the Ashau Valley and on Hamburger Hill. He helped retrieve the bodies of four newsmen killed by the Viet Cong on May 5, 1968, during the Mini-Tet Offensive in Saigon.

During the summer of 1969, Terry took a leave of absence and toured Vietnam, interviewing increasingly disillusioned Black soldiers along the way. He grew frustrated with TIME's war hawk attitude and left the magazine in 1971. Back home, Terry began working on a book about the war based on his reporting, although his ideas were frequently rebuffed; over the next decade, Terry estimated book publishers turned him down 120 times. During this period, Terry kept in touch with Vietnam veterans, and his manuscript grew to 650 pages. In 1982, publisher Random House took interest in the book, but were hesitant to move forwards as they felt Terry's manuscript lacked wide commercial appeal. Editor Erroll McDonald suggested the book be presented as an oral history, and Terry began conducting the interviews that would form the base of the book.

Black soldiers in Vietnam formed close bonds and referred to each other as "Bloods" in a familial sense. Terry defines the "Bloods" as follows:

"[...A] representative cross-section of the Black combat force. Enlisted men, non-commissioned officers, and commissioned officers. Soldiers, sailors, airmen, and Marines. Those with urban backgrounds, and those from rural areas. Those for whom the war had a devastating impact, and those for whom the war basically was an opportunity to advance in a career dedicated to protecting American interests. All of them had a badge of courage in combat”

== Synopsis ==
In the book's introduction, Terry discusses his motivation behind writing Bloods, noting the proximity to the Civil rights movement and the youth of many Black men enlisting. Terry says, "In any Black soldier of Vietnam can be found the darkness that is at the heart of all wars. What the Black veteran illuminates in these pages of his own humanity as well as racial perception will help complete the missing pages of the American experience and add to the pages of universal understanding of man’s most terrible occupation" Terry sought out soldiers of varied backgrounds and ranks for his subjects.

The book consists of interviews with 20 Black Vietnam veterans. The soldiers describe their experiences in first-person narrative, and Terry's questions are not shown. The veterans discuss battles, discrimination, interactions with Vietnamese citizens, and their experiences returning home. Some veterans reported a lack of racial tension during battles, and others spoke out about racism faced behind the frontline, such as the Confederate flags that some white soldiers displayed.

== Reception ==
Bloods was widely covered upon its release and received endorsements from contemporaries including Walter Cronkite, Larry L. King and Studs Terkel. In The New York Times Book Review, Stanley Karnow reviewed Bloods alongside Joe Klein's Payback, also about the Vietnam war. Karnow thought both books demonstrated a larger point about the struggles of Vietnam among Black and White soldiers and how combat challenged racial barriers. Writing for Nieman Reports, Ernest Mercer reflected on his own experience in Vietnam as a "Blood", and praised the voice it gave to Black Vietnam veterans. Bloods was later nominated for a Pulitzer Prize.

Terry's editing and presentation of the interviews has faced criticism. In a September 2000 Journal of American History article on Vietnam oral histories, historian Patrick Hagopian noted, "Wallace Terry cut and pasted his transcribed interviews to produce well formed narratives in keeping with techniques he had learned in a short-story writing class. He knew each story was complete when reading it made his wife cry. Although there may be nothing wrong in principle with editing oral histories so extensively, the introductions of the collections do not disclose that the interviews have been edited."

== Legacy and adaptations ==
Following Bloods' success, Terry gave over 150 talks about the book and his career in Vietnam at colleges and other institutions. Terry looked forward to a major film adaptation of his work and got into contact with producer Quincy Jones, but nothing materialized. Basketball player and activist Kareem Abdul-Jabbar expressed interest in producing a documentary adaptation of Bloods. Terry and Ari Merretazon were approached by the Hughes brothers director duo for the rights to an adaptation of Merretazon's interview. The resulting 1995 crime thriller Dead Presidents, about a Black Vietnam veteran robbing bank truck, was loosely based on Merretazon's life and other events. Film director Spike Lee drew inspiration from the book for his 2020 Vietnam war drama Da 5 Bloods, which focuses on a Black 1st Infantry Division squad. Actors were assigned to read the book, and photographs of Terry's are included in the film. The film contains a scene similar to Harold Bryant's account of using a rope to survive a land mine blast.

Bloods has been used in educational curriculums involving the Vietnam War. Harold “Light Bulb” Bryant is alleged to have falsified his account. The 1998 book Stolen Valor by Vietnam veteran B.G. Burkett and investigative journalist Glenna Whitley claims Bryant was a trashman during his time in Vietnam, while Hagopian believed Bryant's account of surviving a land mine was an urban legend.
