= United States free speech exceptions =

Categories of free speech not protected by the First Amendment

The Bill of Rights in the National Archives

In the United States, some categories of speech are not protected by the First Amendment. According to the Supreme Court of the United States, the U.S. Constitution protects free speech while allowing limitations on certain categories of speech.

Categories of speech that are given lesser or no protection by the First Amendment (and therefore may be restricted) include obscenity, fraud, child pornography, speech integral to illegal conduct, speech that incites imminent lawless action, speech that violates intellectual property law, true threats, and commercial speech such as advertising. As a general rule, lies are protected, with limited exceptions such as defamation, fraud, false advertising, perjury, and lying under oath during an official government proceeding. Even deliberate lies about the government are fully protected.

Hate speech is not a general exception to First Amendment protection. Per Wisconsin v. Mitchell, hate crime sentence enhancements do not violate First Amendment protections because they do not criminalize speech itself, but rather use speech as evidence of motivation, which is constitutionally permissible.

Along with communicative restrictions, less protection is afforded to uninhibited speech when the government acts as subsidizer or speaker, is an employer, controls education, or regulates the mail, airwaves, legal bar, military, prisons, and immigration.

== Incitement ==
The Supreme Court has held that "advocacy of the use of force" is unprotected when it is "directed to inciting or producing imminent lawless action" and is "likely to incite or produce such action".

In the early 20th century, incitement was determined by the "clear and present danger" standard established in Schenck v. United States (1919), in which Justice Oliver Wendell Holmes Jr. observed: "The question in every case is whether the words used are used in such circumstances and are of such a nature as to create a clear and present danger that they will bring about the substantive evils that Congress has a right to prevent."

In Brandenburg v. Ohio (1969), this was narrowed to an "imminent lawless action" standard, with the Supreme Court unanimously reversing the conviction of a Ku Klux Klan group for "advocating ... violence ... as a means of accomplishing political reform" because their statements at a rally did not express an immediate, or imminent intent, to do violence. This decision overruled Schenck v. United States (1919), which held that a "clear and present danger" could justify a law limiting speech. The primary distinction is that the latter test does not criminalize "mere advocacy".

=== Incitement to suicide ===
In 2017, a juvenile court in Massachusetts ruled that repeatedly encouraging someone to commit suicide was not protected by the First Amendment, and found a 20-year-old woman, who was 17 at the time of the offense, guilty of manslaughter on this basis. The judge cited a little-known 1816 precedent. On February 6, 2019, the Massachusetts Supreme Judicial Court ruled that the defendant acted with criminal intent, so her involuntary manslaughter conviction was ordered to stand. The United States Supreme Court declined to hear the case in January 2020, leaving in place the Massachusetts Supreme Court conviction.

== False statements of fact ==
In the defamation case Gertz v. Robert Welch, Inc. (1974), the Supreme Court said that there is "no constitutional value in false statements of fact". However, this is not a concrete rule as the Court has struggled with how much of the "speech that matters" can be put at risk in order to punish a falsehood.

The Supreme Court has established a complex framework for determining which types of false statements are unprotected. There are four such areas which the Court has been explicit about;

1. false statements of fact that are said with a "sufficiently culpable mental state" can be subject to civil or criminal liability.
2. knowingly making a false statement of fact can sometimes be punished. Libel and slander laws fall under this category.
3. negligently false statements of fact may lead to civil liability in some instances.
4. some implicit statements of fact—those that have a "false factual connotation"—can also fall under this exception.

There is also a fifth category of analysis. It is possible that some completely false statements could be entirely free from punishment. The Supreme Court held in the landmark case New York Times v. Sullivan (1964) that lies about the government may be protected completely. However, this category is not entirely clear, as the question of whether false historical or medical claims are protected is still disputed.

In addition, false statements made under penalty of perjury are subject to legal sanctions if they are judged to be material.

The 1988 decision in Riley v. National Federation of the Blind of North Carolina struck down a license requirement and limits on fundraising fees for telemarketers as unconstitutional and not narrowly tailored enough to survive First Amendment scrutiny. The 2002 decision Illinois ex rel. Madigan v. Telemarketing Assoc., Inc. upheld an Illinois telemarketing anti-fraud law against claims that it was a form of prior restraint, affirming consumer protection against misrepresentation was a valid government interest justifying a free speech exception for false claims made in that context.

The 2012 decision United States v. Alvarez struck down part of the Stolen Valor Act of 2005, which prohibited false claims that a person received a military medal.

- 18 U.S.C. § 1038 (False information and hoaxes)

This law makes it a federal crime to knowingly convey false or misleading information about certain serious crimes or attacks, including biological attacks, under circumstances where the information could reasonably be believed.

== Commercial speech ==
Commercial speech occupies a unique role as a free speech exception. While there is no complete exception, legal advocates recognize it as having "diminished protection". For example, false advertising can be punished and misleading advertising may be prohibited.

Commercial advertising may be restricted in ways that other speech can't if a substantial governmental interest is advanced, and such restriction supports that interest as well as not being overly broad.

This doctrine of limited protection for advertisements is due to a balancing inherent in the policy explanations for the rule, namely that other types of speech (for example, political) are much more important. In J.C. Penney Corporation vs Cynthia Spann, Cynthia Spann argued that J.C. Penney used false advertising on their sales. Spann won the case.

=== Speech owned by others ===
Another class of permissible restrictions on speech is based on intellectual property rights. Both copyrights and trade secrets fall under this exception. The Supreme Court first upheld this in Harper & Row v. Nation Enterprises (1985), where copyright law was defended against a First Amendment free speech challenge. Also, broadcasting rights to air television and radio shows are not an infringement of free speech rights. The Court has upheld such restrictions as an incentive for artists in the "speech marketplace".

== Counterfeit currency ==
Laws against counterfeit United States currency, and even some photographic and artistic reproductions which could not be feasibly passed off as real currency, have been consistently upheld. Article I, Section 8 of the U.S. Constitution gives Congress the power to "provide for the Punishment of counterfeiting the Securities and current Coin of the United States".

Relevant cases include:

- J. S. G. Boggs, an artist using obviously fake renderings of currency to purchase goods
- William Michael Harnett, an artist stopped from painting early currency by the Secret Service in 1886
- Wagner v. Simon (1974), which considered an obviously fake $30 bill with Richard Nixon
- Regan v. Time, Inc. (1984), which considered a Sports Illustrated cover photo that included a basketball hoop stuffed with $100 bills

== Fighting words ==
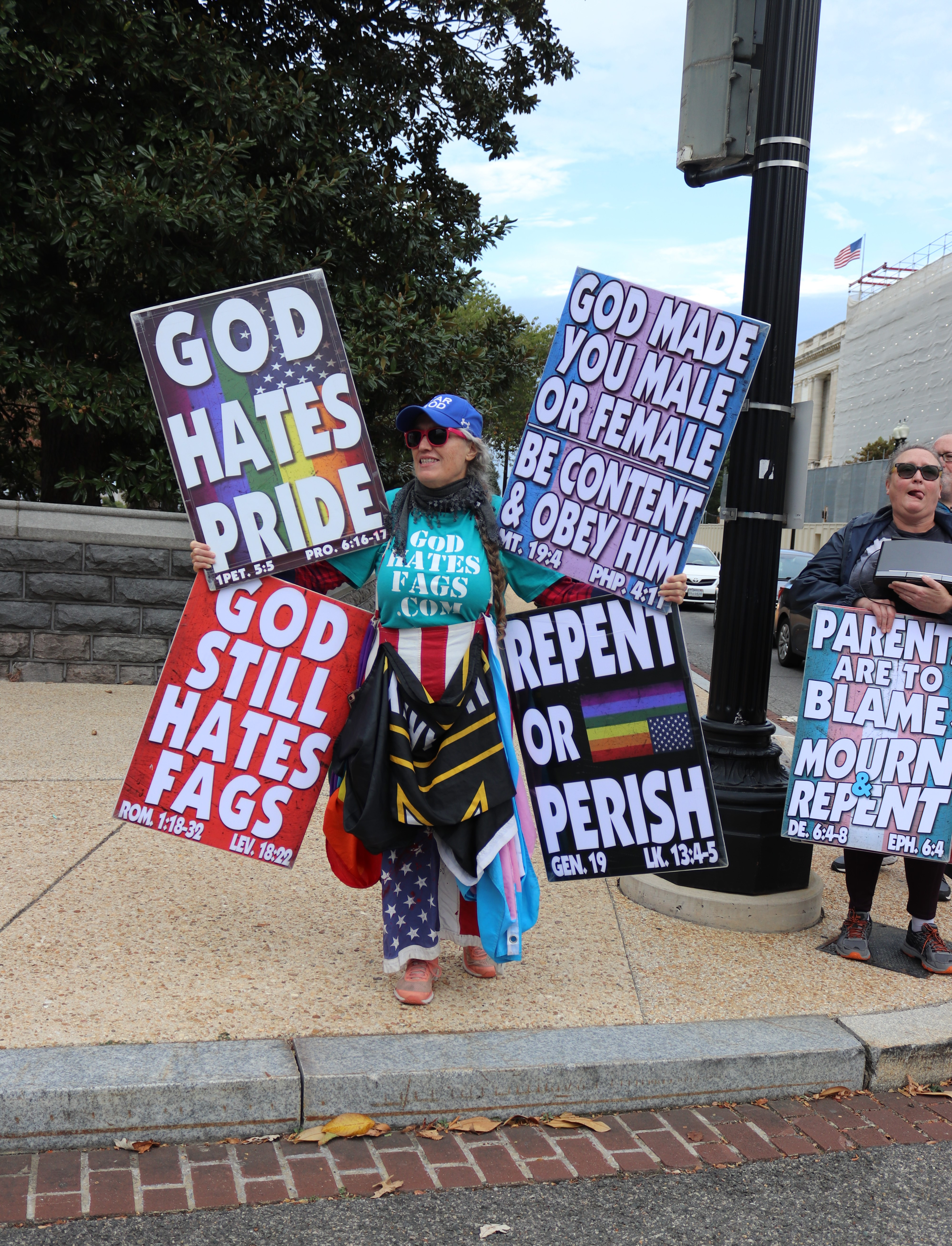
A Westboro Baptist Church (WBC) protest in 2019. One WBC protest was the subject of an "offensive speech" Supreme Court case in the 2010 case Snyder v. Phelps.

In Chaplinsky v. New Hampshire (1942), the Supreme Court held that speech is unprotected if it constitutes "fighting words". Fighting words, as defined by the Court, is speech that "tend[s] to incite an immediate breach of the peace" by provoking a fight, so long as it is a "personally abusive [word] which, when addressed to the ordinary citizen, is, as a matter of common knowledge, inherently likely to provoke a violent reaction". Additionally, such speech must be "directed to the person of the hearer" and is "thus likely to be seen as a 'direct personal insult'".

"True threats of violence" that are directed at a person or group of persons that have the intent of placing the target at risk of bodily harm or death are generally unprotected. However, there are several exceptions. For example, the Supreme Court has held that "threats may not be punished if a reasonable person would understand them as obvious hyperbole", he writes. Additionally, threats of "social ostracism" and of "politically motivated boycotts" are constitutionally protected.

== Threatening the president of the United States ==
Under Title 18 Section 871 of the United States Code it is illegal to knowingly and willfully make "any threat to take the life of, to kidnap, or to inflict bodily harm upon the president of the United States." This also applies to any "President-elect, Vice President or other officer next in the order of succession to the office of President, or Vice President-elect." This law is distinct from other forms of true threats because the threatener does not need to have the actual capability to carry out the threat; thus, for example, a person in prison could be charged.

== Restrictions based on special capacity of government ==
=== As employer ===
The government is not permitted to fire an employee based on the employee's speech if three criteria are met: the speech addresses a matter of public concern; the speech is not made pursuant to the employee's job duties, but rather the speech is made in the employee's capacity as a citizen; and the damage inflicted on the government by the speech does not outweigh the value of the speech to the employee and the public. Specifically, speech is "treated as a matter of public concern" by reference to the "content, form, and context of a given statement". The exception with regards to balancing the harm of a statement and the value of the statement (the Pickering test) is done by considering the degree to which the speech either interferes with close working relationships, disrupts the office, or even has the potential to do either.

=== As regulator of the communications industry ===
Regulation of speech on broadcast radio and television are permissible when they are narrowly tailored and further a substantial government interest. Interests that have been found "substantial" include shielding listeners from supposedly offensive ideas and shielding children from offensive expression. The Supreme Court has limited these rules to traditional broadcasting, refusing an attempt to apply this to the internet.

==== Obscenity ====
Under the Miller test, speech is unprotected if "the average person, applying contemporary community standards, would find that the [subject or work in question], taken as a whole, appeals to the prurient interest", "the work depicts or describes, in a patently offensive way, sexual conduct or excretory functions specifically defined by applicable state law" and "the work, taken as a whole, lacks serious literary, artistic, political, or scientific value". Some subsidiary components of this rule may permit private possession of obscene materials at one's home. Additionally, the phrase "appeals to the prurient interest" is limited to appeals to a "shameful or morbid interest in sex".

The Court has also held that a person may only be punished if he knows the actual "contents of the material". In Smith v. California (1959), the Supreme Court thus gave a defense of "reasonable ignorance" to an obscenity charge. The rationale for this exception is that justices have believed that obscenity has a "tendency to exert a corrupting and debasing impact leading to antisocial behavior".

==== Pornography ====
The exception for child pornography is distinct from the obscenity exception in a few ways. First, the rule is much more specific to what falls under the exception. Second, it is irrelevant whether any part of the speech meets the Miller test; if it is classified under the child pornography exception at all, it becomes unprotected. The rule provides that speech is unprotected if it "visually depicts" children below the age of majority and "performing sexual acts or lewdly exhibiting their genitals". In contrast to the rules for simple obscenity, private possession of child pornography "may be outlawed".

While this exception is very concrete, it is also limited. It does not apply to pornography that people think is harmful when shown to children, or pornography that urges viewers to harm children.

=== As educator ===
When the Government acts as a kindergarten through twelfth grade educator, they are allowed to restrict student speech in certain instances. The Supreme Court ruled in Tinker v. Des Moines School Dist. (1969) that restriction is permissible only when speech "materially and substantially interferes with the requirements of appropriate discipline in the operation of the school". Later court decisions added more situations where restrictions were possible, including student speech about drugs, "vulgar and offensive" language, and school-operated newspapers. The primary basis for the educator-distinction is the concept of in loco parentis, the principle that the school functions in lieu of the students' parents, and thus has broader discretion in limiting students' speech and expression.

=== As subsidizer or speaker ===
The most complex special capacity of the government is when it functions, in one way or another, as the subsidizer of the speech in question. As a general rule, the government can itself say whatever it wants to, even if this "favors one viewpoint over another". If the government is using the speakers to express its own message, it is constitutional. This analysis can change if the government is trying to encourage a "diversity of private views indiscriminately". If it is indiscriminate, then under Legal Services Corp. v. Velazquez (2001), the government must be acting in a viewpoint-neutral way. However, if the government is basing some judgment of "quality" on the views, then only "invidious viewpoint discrimination" is barred.

The government may not impose conditions on how subsidy recipients spend money they get from other sources.

=== As regulator of the bar and legal proceedings ===
The basic principle behind government's regulation of the bar has greater power to regulate the speech of lawyers. A balancing test is employed when the Court considers attorney speech. This test weighs "the State's legitimate interest in regulating the activity in question [with] the interests of the attorney". Thus, while commercial advertising by lawyers is generally protected, rules of professional conduct and ethical guidelines are still permitted.

=== As controller and operator of the military ===
With respect to the United States military, the federal government has extremely broad power to restrict the speech of military officers, even if such a restriction would be invalid with a civilian. The Supreme Court affirmed this principle in the closely determined 5 to 3 decision, Parker v. Levy (1974), when the Court held the military was essentially a "specialized society from civilian society", which necessitated stricter guidelines. Justice William O. Douglas, writing the dissent, argued that "Uttering one's belief is sacrosanct under the First Amendment."

Since Parker, there have been few cases to issue more specific limits on the government's control of military expression.

=== As prison warden ===
When the government acts as controller of prisons, it has broad abilities to limit the free speech of inmates. Essentially any restriction that is "reasonably related to legitimate penological interests" is valid. This broad power also extends to pretrial detainees and even convicts who are on probation or parole. The only limit recognized by the Court is that the prison must provide an "alternate means of exercising that right" of speech, an alternate channel, that still allows legitimate speech to be expressed.

=== As regulator of immigration ===
The government may not criminally punish immigrants based on speech that would be protected if said by a citizen. On entry across borders, the government may bar non-citizens from the United States based on their speech, even if that speech would have been protected if said by a citizen. Speech rules as to deportation, on the other hand, are unclear. Lower courts are divided on the question, while the leading cases on the subject are from the Red Scare.

== See also ==
- Freedom of the press in the United States § Historical constraints on press freedom
- Gag orders in the United States
- Prior restraint
- Virginia v. Black
- List of landmark Supreme Court free speech cases
- Privacy laws of the United States

== Sources ==
- Camp, Julie Van (2005). "First Amendment". Professor of Philosophy. California State University, Long Beach. Archived from the original on 14 February 2015.
- Cohen, Henry (16 October 2009). "Freedom of Speech and Press: Exceptions to the First Amendment" (PDF). Legislative Attorney. Congressional Research Service.
- Johnson, Jay (2001). "Note: The Interaction Between Statutory and Constitutional Arguments in Legal Services Corp. v. Velazquez". Journal of Law and Politics. 17 (1): 353–372.
- Volokh, Eugene (2008). First Amendment and Related Statutes: Problems, Cases and Policy Arguments (3rd ed.). Foundation Press (published 12 May 2008). ISBN 978-1-59941-338-9.
