= John Livesey (disambiguation) =

John Livesey (1911–2005) was a Canadian politician

John Livesey may also refer to:

- Jack Livesey (footballer) (1924–1988), English footballer, (real name John Livesey)
- Jack Livesey (impostor) (born 1954), British military imposter, (real name John Livesey)

== See also ==
- Jack Livesey (1901–1961), British film actor
