= Military impostor =

Person who lies about military service

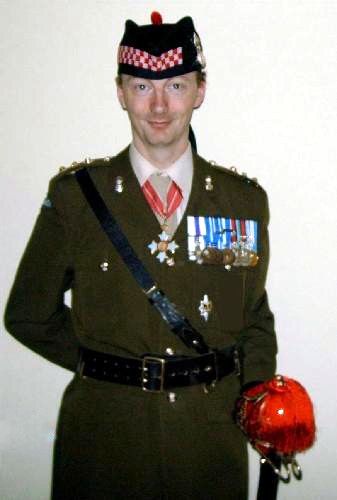
Alan Mcilwraith, who falsely claimed to be a highly decorated British Army officer (2005). His uniform and medals were purchased online.

A military impostor is a person who makes false claims about their military service in civilian life. This includes claims by people that have never been in the military as well as lies or embellishments by genuine veterans. Some individuals who do this also wear privately obtained uniforms or medals which were never officially issued to them.

In British military slang, such impostors are called "Walts", based on James Thurber's fictional character, Walter Mitty, who daydreamed of being a war hero. In the United States since the early 2000s, the term stolen valor has become popular slang for this behavior, named for the 1998 book Stolen Valor. Other terms include "fake warriors", "military phonies", "medal cheats", and "military posers".

Lying about military service or wearing a uniform or medals that were not earned is criminalized in some circumstances, especially if done with the goal of obtaining money or any other kind of tangible benefit, though laws vary by country.

== Behaviors ==
Military impostors engage in a broad range of deceptive behaviors, all intended to garner recognition from others. An impostor may make verbal statements, written claims, or create deceptive impressions through actions, such as wearing a uniform, rank insignia, unit symbols, medals, or patches.

Generally impostors fall into two broad categories: civilians who have never been in any branch of the military, and real veterans who make false claims exaggerating their experiences or accomplishments. Impostors in the latter category may claim any of the following:

- Being the recipient of awards that were not earned
- Having a longer service duration
- Having a more favorable discharge
- Holding a higher rank than one actually held
- Having served with a different branch of the military
- Having served with a different unit that is more famous
- Being a different role or occupational specialty
- Involvement in a war or specific engagement one was not present for
- Performing a brave or valorous act that never happened
- Participation in "special" or "secret" operations
- Being a prisoner of war (POW).

While many individuals outright fabricate some or all of their military service history, others employ equivocation tactics, ambiguous language, omission of important details, or similarly misleading behavior that avoids making a technically false statement they can be called on, but still gives a deceptive impression. A common example is stating one was in a branch of the military during a specific war. In many contexts, such a statement implies that the speaker was deployed to a combat zone, even if in reality they never saw combat. A similar misleading statement is boasting about being a member of a branch or unit that is well known for its combat prowess and heroic achievements, when the speaker was purely in a logistical role without any combat experience. Similarly, they may emphasize their many years of service, while failing to mention that most or all of it was spent in the reserves with no deployments. They may also casually drop terms or jargon in their writing or speech that is unique to the military or to specific types of service role.

Impostors also frequently claim to be part of "classified" operations as an excuse for why they cannot provide details when confronted, or why there is no record of their actions or service.

== Motivations ==
Historically, when military record-keeping was less accurate than it is now, some men falsely claimed to be war veterans to obtain military pensions. Such men added a few years to their ages and claimed service in obscure units. Most did not make extravagant claims, because they were seeking money, not public attention that might expose them for stolen valor. There were numerous U.S. media reports in the 1950s of men claiming to be Confederate veterans over 110 years old, and most articles debunked these stories, saying the men had exaggerated their ages and made fraudulent pension claims years earlier and then found themselves in the spotlight after the last genuine Civil War veterans died off. Walter Williams, noted below, is considered one of these impostors, though some people continue to believe his claim.

In the modern world, reasons for posing as a member of the military or exaggerating one's service record vary, but the intent is almost always to gain the respect and admiration of others. Philosophy professor Verna V. Gehring describes such people as "virtue impostors," in that they don't necessarily adopt the identity of another person, but instead adopt a false history for themselves to impersonate virtues and characteristics. Many are only motivated by social recognition, attempting to exploit the reverence and respect for veterans in their country. These individuals often become absorbed in a fantasy of being a veteran that they attempt to live out in real life, sometimes even inserting themselves into public events or ceremonies, or volunteering for interviews with journalists about their alleged experiences. Others are motivated by more direct gains, such as impressing employers, casting directors, audiences, investors, voters in political campaigns or romantic interests.

Occasionally impostors use their claims in an attempt to intimidate others, such as claiming to be a trained sniper or ex-special forces, or use their fabricated experiences as a pretense of authority for their opinions on political matters. False claims of military service are also used by panhandlers to increase donations, sometimes coupled with real or fake injuries that are implied to be combat-related.

== Detection ==
Military imposters are frequently caught and exposed due to mistakes and inconsistencies in their stories or behaviors. For example, they may be too young or too old to have been in the war they say they were or too young for the rank they claim to be, might inadvertently profess to have been in two different places at once, or might state factually incorrect information about the war they allegedly were part of. Among imposters that wear uniforms, they often make mistakes about the placement of patches, insignia and medals, and may have some from the wrong branch or from old campaigns they could not possibly have taken part in. Real veterans often can spot mistakes more readily, especially if they were part of the same branch the imposter claims to have served in.

Some countries have ways of verifying military service and certain claims within it. In the United States, most real veterans that have been separated from the military for any reason have a DD Form 214 they can present – although other forms are possible, ex. DD-256 – which indicates their branch, rank, unit, MOS/AFSC, awards, and other information. Alternatively, requests can also be made to the National Personnel Records Center using the Freedom of Information Act (FOIA) to verify service. Other claims can be verified against public lists, such as recipients of the Medal of Honor or the prisoner of war list from the Vietnam War. Several websites are specifically devoted to verifying the claims of alleged military imposters, and if discovered to have lied, proceed to shame the perpetrator publicly.

=== False accusations ===
Accusations do occasionally backfire, with real veterans accused of being imposters. Doug Sterner, a US veteran of the Vietnam War, who catalogs military awards, and Stolen Valor author B.G. Burkett, note that some modern veterans have become hypersensitive to imposters, leading to vigilantism or even turning detection into a "hunting game." A common error is placing too much emphasis on the neatness of a uniform or certain quirks about how it is worn, which is not necessarily compelling when a veteran is older and has been out of the service for several decades. Another is making too many inferences based on older regulations, such as gender restrictions that were in place in the past. Even FOIA requests to the National Personnel Records Center, considered the most thorough type of verification for US veterans, are not perfect and sometimes fail to find a record even if the veteran is genuine. Sterner states, "There's some people that feel good about confronting people, and making themselves look big by trying to take them down. But when they do that, they're going to make mistakes."

== Criminal laws ==
Laws vary between countries regarding false statements about military service or the wearing of uniforms or medals.

=== Australia ===
Under the Australia's Defence Act, 1903, as amended, it is a federal crime to falsely claim to be a returned soldier, sailor or airman. It is also a crime to wear any service decoration one has not earned. Exceptions are made for formal occasions such as ANZAC and Remembrance Day parades, where family members, not in uniform, can wear relatives' medals. Uniformed service members can wear their own, and ancestors' medals. Medals earned by another person are worn on the right breast instead of the left.

=== Canada ===
In Canada, section 419 of the Criminal Code makes it a crime to wear a uniform from the Canadian Forces or of any other navy, army or air force, without authority as well as any awards or marks not earned. It additionally makes it a crime to possess any fraudulent discharge papers, commissions, warrants or military ID, including those that are forged, altered or belong to someone else.

=== China ===
In the People's Republic of China, it was an offence to wear military uniform without authority, or possess any fraudulent discharge papers, commissions, warrants or military ID, including those that are forged, altered or belong to someone else, and shall be sentenced to fixed-term imprisonment of not more than three years, criminal detention, surveillance, or deprivation of political rights; if the circumstances are serious, it will be sentenced to fixed-term imprisonment of not less than three years but not more than ten years. This crime refers to the act of fraudulently pretending to be a soldier's identity or job title in order to obtain illegal benefits, and damage the prestige of the armed forces and their normal activities.

According to the provisions of Article 372 of the Criminal Law of the People's Republic Of China, anyone who commits this crime and the circumstances are serious shall be sentenced to fixed-term imprisonment of not less than three years and not more than ten years. The so-called "serious circumstances" generally refers to the impersonation of soldiers many times, including those who do not change behavior after repeated instruction; those who pretend to be soldiers in illegal and criminal activities and cause bad influence; those who pretend to be military leaders at all levels, confidential personnel, etc.

=== Japan ===
Under the Minor Offenses Act, Article 1, Section 15, any person who fraudulently claims to hold an official position, rank, decoration, degree or other title prescribed by law or its equivalent in a foreign country, or wearing uniform, regardless its civil servant, police or military uniform, decoration, insignia or other mark prescribed by law or one made in the likeness thereof, even though he or she is not qualified to do so, shall be liable to imprisonment or fine.

Also, under the Special Criminal Act for the Implementation of the Status of Forces Agreement, Article 9, "Offences of Unlawfully Wearing Uniforms", any person who, without authority, wears the uniform of a member of the United States Armed Forces, or clothing made to resemble it, shall be subject to imprisonment or fine.

=== Ireland ===
Under Section 264 of the Defence Act, 1954, it is an offence for anyone to wear the uniform of the Defence Force unless they are a serving member, or have the permission of the Minister. Punishment upon conviction is a fine up to €2,500, or six months imprisonment, or both. The prohibition less about naive military imposters, and more about preventing terrorists from wearing Defence Forces uniforms. Under Section 267 of the same Act, it is an offence for anyone to falsely wear a military decoration, medal ribbon, badge, wound or service stripe, rank insignia, or emblem. Punishment upon conviction is a fine up to €500, or three months imprisonment, or both. As decorations can only be worn by the recipient, family relatives of a deceased service members should not wear their decorations. An exception is when the decoration is awarded posthumously and is being presented directly to next of kin.

=== Philippines ===
In the Philippines, regulation of wearing of military, police, and coast guard uniforms is covered under Republic Act 493. The act only authorizes the use of uniform, insignia, medals, or badges by active, inactive, reserve, trainee, and veterans. Exceptions may be given by the Secretary of National Defense for use such as in film making or theater productions. A bill is pending in Congress to amend R.A. 493, which shall seek heavier penalties up to 10 years imprisonment and PhP 20,000 fine.

=== Romania ===
According to Article 258 of the Penal Code of Romania, it is an offence to impersonate a member of the armed forces by wearing a uniform without permission and it shall be punished by imprisonment or by a fine. The law also establishes the penalty for individuals who unlawfully wear uniforms or insignia of a public authority.

=== Sweden ===
According to Chapter 17, Section 15 of the Swedish Criminal Code, a person who, without authorisation, passes themselves off as exercising public authority is guilty of "impersonating a public official" and subject to a fine or imprisonment for a maximum of six months. This also applies to a person who, without authority, wears a uniform, mark or other service emblem that gives the impression that they belong to the Swedish armed forces or other branches of public service. If the crime has caused considerable harm to the public or to any individual, or is otherwise to be regarded as gross, the offender shall be sentenced to imprisonment for a maximum of two years.

=== United Kingdom ===
In the United Kingdom, it was an offence under the Army Act 1955 (3 & 4 Eliz. 2. c. 18) to wear real or replica military decorations with intent to deceive. However, this law was superseded by the Armed Forces Act 2006 (c. 52), which lacks this prohibition.

It is still a crime in the UK for a civilian to wear a uniform of the armed forces without authorization under the Uniforms Act 1894 (57 & 58 Vict. c. 45), and false claims of military service used to obtain money or other enrichment are prosecuted under the general crime of fraud. In November 2016, the Defence Select Committee recommended making the wearing of unearned medals a criminal offence punishable by up to six months imprisonment, though the law was not passed. Following another highly publicized case in 2023, there were increasing calls by political figures to criminalize such acts.

=== United States ===
In the United States, the Stolen Valor Act of 2005, which criminalized any false claim regarding military service, was struck down as violating the Free Speech Clause of the First Amendment. Subsequently, the Stolen Valor Act of 2013, which makes it a federal offense to falsely claim to have received any of several major military awards with the intention of obtaining money, property, or other tangible benefits, was passed and remains in effect. There are additional laws criminalizing the altering or forging of discharge documents, and attempting to obtain veteran's benefits from the government.

== Notable military imposters ==
- Nick Adderley – British former senior police officer who claimed to have served over ten years in the Royal Navy and was photographed wearing the South Atlantic Medal for the Falklands War, as well as the General Service Medal with Northern Ireland clasp. In actuality, Adderley was only 15 years old throughout the duration of the Falklands War (1982) and did not enlist in the Royal Navy until 1984, leaving after serving less than two years. After an investigation by the Independent Office for Police Conduct, Adderley was suspended and eventually dismissed in 2024, and was barred from ever serving as a police officer again.
- Joseph A. Cafasso – American con artist and former Fox News military analyst who claimed to have been a highly decorated Special Forces soldier and Vietnam War veteran. He actually served in the United States Army for only 44 days in 1976.
- Wes Cooley – Former United States Representative from Oregon who claimed to have fought in the Korean War. He served in the U.S. Army for two years, but was never in Korea. Convicted of lying in an official document.
- Brian Dennehy – American actor who claimed to have fought and been wounded in the Vietnam War. He served in the United States Marine Corps from 1959 to 1963. He was not wounded and did not serve in Vietnam.
- George Dupre – Canadian who claimed that he worked for the Special Operations Executive (SOE) and the French Resistance during World War II. Dupre served in World War II, but he was never in France or with the SOE. Was the subject of a best-selling book about his fabricated experiences. Confessed after being interviewed by a reporter who tricked him by dropping false names.
- Frank Dux – American martial artist, fight choreographer and author who claims he was on covert missions to Southeast Asia while serving with the United States Marine Corps and was awarded the Medal of Honor, and that he was also a CIA field officer. Dux served in the United States Marine Corps Reserve from 1975 to 1981, but was never sent overseas, never received the Medal of Honor, and was never recruited by the CIA.
- Joseph Ellis – American professor and historian who claimed a tour of duty in the Vietnam War. He enlisted in the US Army in 1969 and then taught history at West Point until he was discharged 1972, having never been deployed. He issued a public apology in August 2001.
- Sven Hassel – Pen name of the Danish convicted criminal Børge Willy Redsted Pedersen who claimed to have volunteered for the German army and to have served in tank units during World War II. He further claimed to have surrendered to Soviet troops in Berlin in 1945 and to have spent the following years in prisoner-of-war camps in various countries, but independent sources state that he was arrested in Denmark in 1945 after the liberation and was held in prison there, first as a suspect and then as a convicted criminal.
- L. Ron Hubbard – Science fiction author and founder of Scientology. The Church of Scientology presents Hubbard as a "much-decorated war hero who commanded a corvette and during hostilities was crippled and wounded". According to Scientology publications, he served as a "Commodore of Corvette squadrons" in "all five theaters of World War II" and was awarded "twenty-one medals and palms" for his service. He was "severely wounded and was taken crippled and blinded" to a military hospital, where he "worked his way back to fitness, strength and full perception in less than two years, using only what he knew and could determine about Man and his relationship to the universe." Hubbard's official Navy service records indicate that "his military performance was, at times, substandard", that he was only awarded a handful of campaign medals and that he was never injured or wounded in combat and was never awarded a Purple Heart. Most of his military service was spent ashore in the continental United States on administrative or training duties. He briefly commanded two anti-submarine vessels, USS YP-422 and USS PC-815, in coastal waters off Massachusetts, Oregon and California in 1942 and 1943, respectively.
- Jonathan Idema – American con artist who claimed to be a United States government-sponsored Special Forces operative in Afghanistan, and that he had 12 years of Special Forces service, 22 years of combat training, and 18 years of covert operations experience. In actuality, he served in the Army from 1975 to 1984 primarily in the Reserve, and while he did serve with the 11th Special Forces Group, it was purely as logistical support. He never saw combat and was never sent overseas. Convicted of fraud in 1994 and later convicted in 2004 by an Afghan court of capturing and torturing citizens he believed were terrorists.
- Tim Kennedy - American Mixed Martial Arts fighter. In July 2025, Kennedy came under investigation after admitting he had misrepresented his military record, specifically by implying he received a Bronze Star with Valor he was never awarded. Kennedy later acknowledged that he had “directly or indirectly” suggested he earned the valor distinction, stating: "That is not true, and there is no excuse for it." He clarified that while he did receive a Bronze Star, it was for meritorious service rather than combat valor.
- Konstantin Khrutsky – Belarusian clergyman before the World War I, who lived in 1955 in Novorossiysk, Soviet Union, and claimed to be a centenarian born in 1855 who participated in the Russo-Turkish War (1877-1878), known in Bulgaria as the Liberation War. He was invited to the Soviet-aligned Bulgaria and was decorated with the highest order of that country. Long after his death in 1969 he was exposed as an impostor born in 1879, after the war, and never serving in army. His younger brother Samson was also a centennarian claimant and military impostor, but more low-key, pretending to have fought in the Battle of Tsushima.
- M. Larry Lawrence – American real estate developer and later United States Ambassador to Switzerland who claimed to have been a seaman, first class, in the Merchant Marine during World War II and a veteran of the Arctic convoys. Upon his death, he was buried in Arlington National Cemetery with a eulogy delivered by President Bill Clinton. A year later, his claims of service were exposed as fraudulent and his remains were disinterred.
- Nicolai Lilin – Italian-Moldovan author who claims to have served in the antiterrorism corps of the GRU during the Second Chechen War. In a Vanity Fair interview, he claimed he was drafted while studying yoga in India, while in an interview with Oliver Bullough he stated he had volunteered. He has also claimed to have been a drill instructor for the Afghan National Security Forces. Inquiries undertaken by Kommersant journalist Elena Chernenko however show that his name does not appear in any sources close to the Russian Ministry of Defence, and one of his acquaintances from his native Bender stated that he had never served in the army, while historian Donald Rayfield expressed doubt as to whether Lilin, a native of Transnistria, could have been eligible for the Russian armed forces.
- Jack Livesey – British historian, military advisor on film productions, and author who claimed to have a distinguished 20-year career in the Parachute Regiment. He actually served as a cook in the Army Catering Corps for three years.
- Jesse Macbeth – anti-war activist who claimed to be an Army Ranger and veteran of the Iraq War. In reality he was discharged from the Army after only 44 days for being "unfit for duty". Confessed in federal court after being charged with possessing a forged or altered military discharge certificate and making false statements in seeking benefits from the Veterans Administration.
- Ferdinand Marcos, president of the Philippines from 1965 to 1986, claimed during his campaign to be the "most decorated war hero of the Philippines," being the recipient of 33 war medals and decorations, including the Distinguished Service Cross and the Medal of Honor, as well as having led a guerilla force of 9,000 men. While Marcos served on the Allied side during World War II, he only received two awards, the Gold Cross and the Distinguished Service Star, both of which were contested, and his claim of commanding a guerilla force was found to be mostly false, primarily as part of a scheme to obtain reparations and backpay.
- Joseph McCarthy – The United States Senator from Wisconsin and namesake of McCarthyism falsely claimed participation in 32 aerial missions in order to qualify for a Distinguished Flying Cross and multiple awards of the Air Medal, which the Marine Corps chain of command decided to approve in 1952 because of his political influence. McCarthy also publicized a letter of commendation which he claimed had been signed by his commanding officer and Admiral Chester W. Nimitz, then Chief of Naval Operations. However, his commander revealed that McCarthy had written this letter himself, probably while preparing award citations and commendation letters as an additional duty, and that he had signed his commander's name, after which Nimitz signed it during the process of just signing numerous other such letters. A "war wound"—a badly broken leg—that McCarthy made the subject of varying stories involving airplane crashes or anti-aircraft fire had in fact happened aboard ship during a raucous celebration for sailors crossing the equator for the first time. Because of McCarthy's various lies about his military heroism, his "Tail-Gunner Joe" nickname was sarcastically used as a term of mockery by his critics.
- Alan Mcilwraith – Call centre worker from Glasgow who, among other things, claimed that he was a decorated captain in the British Army. Mcilwraith had never served in the military.
- William Northrop – American military historian, investigator and writer who claimed to have been a US Army Special Forces officer for three years in the Vietnam War, including being badly wounded at the Battle of Lang Vei, an event at which only 24 Americans were present. An extensive search of military records and a check with the FBI revealed he never served in any branch of the United States military.
- Sgt. Slaughter (born 1948 as Robert Remus), a professional wrestler with the gimmick of a former U.S. Marine who fought in the Vietnam War never served in the military. Despite this, he has talked about military service while seeming to be speaking as himself, and not in kayfabe character.
- Douglas R. Stringfellow – Former congressman from Utah who claimed to have been an OSS agent in World War II, that he was a recipient of a Silver Star and that he was tortured by the Germans at Belsen Prison, which left him with a mobility impairment that left him unable to walk, requiring the use of a wheelchair. In reality, he was a private in the Army Air Forces, never worked for the OSS, did not receive the Silver Star, and was capable of walking with a cane. Made a public confession after he was exposed by his political opponents.
- Donald J. Trump - U.S. president who has repeatedly posted images of himself as a military officer. On Aug. 4, 2026, Trump posted an image on Truth Social depicting himself as a four-star US Army general, adorned with a variety of awards and medals. The image drew heavy criticism and accusations of stolen valor from opponents, who pointed out that Trump never served in the armed forces and received five draft deferments during the Vietnam War. A post by Trump on Aug. 1, 2026 depicts himself as an officer in the American Revolutionary War. Trump has also mused about his desire to receive a Purple Heart and a Medal of Honor. In February 2026, Trump said, "I decided to go to Iraq. I was extremely brave. So brave in fact that I wanted to give myself the Congressional Medal of Honor."
- Friedrich Wilhelm Voigt – German impostor who masqueraded as a Prussian military officer in 1906 and became famous as "The Captain of Köpenick"
- Delmart Vreeland – American con artist and convicted sex offender who claimed to be to a spy and Naval Intelligence officer where he allegedly learned of the September 11 attacks before they happened. United States Navy records revealed he enlisted in 1986 but was discharged before completing basic training due to poor behavior.
- Micah Wright – Author and anti-war activist who claimed to have been an Army Ranger involved in the United States invasion of Panama and several other special operations. He was an ROTC student in college, but neither earned a commission nor served in the military. Confessed and apologized online after learning an exposé was being written.
- Walter Williams – Thought to have been the last surviving veteran of the American Civil War upon his death in 1959. Evidence later surfaced that he was not born the year he claimed and was still a young child when the war ended.

== In fiction ==
Cyrus Trask, a character in John Steinbeck's novel East of Eden, loses his leg in the first and only action he saw during the American Civil War. He subsequently creates an entire military career, encompassing nearly every battle of the war, and stating that he was a personal advisor to President Abraham Lincoln.

In the 1975 film Paper Tiger, the main character is a British man who claims to have held the rank of Major during the Second World War, and to have won the Military Cross twice and the Croix de Guerre for his exploits. It is revealed he in fact completed no military service at all during the war.

In the 2007 video game Team Fortress 2 the character of the Soldier has never been in the American military despite claiming so.

== See also ==
- Mitchell Paige, Medal of Honor recipient who later tracked imposters
- Don Shipley, retired Navy SEAL who exposes fraudulent claims of military service.
- Swiftboating, slang for an unfair or untrue political attack, which sometimes takes the form of falsely accusing a candidate of dishonesty about military service.
- List of nations that prohibit camouflage clothing
- Police impersonation, a similar concept involving police uniforms
- Quack, person who falsely claims to be a medical professional
