= False statement =

Statement contradicted by facts and reality

A false statement is a statement that is not true. Although the word fallacy is sometimes used as a synonym for false statement, that is not how the word is used in philosophy, mathematics, logic and most formal contexts.

A false statement does not need to be a lie. A lie is a statement that is known to be untrue and is used to mislead. A false statement is a statement that is untrue but not necessarily told to mislead, as a statement given by someone who does not know it is untrue.

== Examples of false statements ==
=== Misleading statement (lie) ===
John told his little brother that sea otters aren't mammals, but fish, even though John himself was a marine biologist and knew otherwise. John simply wanted to see his little brother fail his class report, in order to teach him to begin projects early, which help him develop skills necessary to succeed in life.

=== Statement made out of ignorance ===
James, John's brother, stated in his class report that sea otters were fish. James got an F after his teacher pointed out why that statement was false. James did not know that sea otters were in fact mammals because he heard that sea otters were fish from his older brother John, a marine biologist.

== In law ==
In some jurisdictions, false statement is a crime similar to perjury.

=== United States ===
In U.S. law, a "false statement" generally refers to United States federal false statements statute, contained in 18 U.S.C. § 1001. Most commonly, prosecutors use this statute to reach cover-up crimes such as perjury, false declarations, and obstruction of justice and government fraud cases. Its earliest progenitor was the False Claims Act of 1863, and in 1934 the requirement of an intent to defraud was eliminated to enforce the National Industrial Recovery Act of 1933 (NIRA) against producers of "hot oil", oil produced in violation of production restrictions established pursuant to the NIRA.

The statute criminalizes a government official who "knowingly and willfully":

(1) falsifies, conceals, or covers up by any trick, scheme, or device a material fact;
(2) makes any materially false, fictitious, or fraudulent statement or representation; or
(3) makes or uses any false writing or document knowing the same to contain any materially false, fictitious, or fraudulent statement or entry.

== See also ==
- Misinformation
- Fake news
- False accusation
- False statements of fact
- Jumping to conclusions
- Making false statements
