= Wallace Terry =

American historian

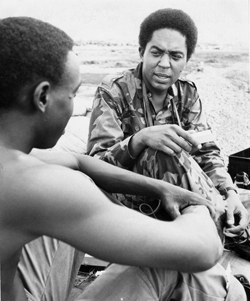
Wallace Terry (right) interviews G.I. in Vietnam 1969

Wallace Houston Terry, II (April 21, 1938 – May 29, 2003) was an African-American journalist and oral historian, best known for his book about black soldiers in Vietnam, Bloods: An Oral History of the Vietnam War by Black Veterans (1984), which served as inspiration for the 1995 crime thriller Dead Presidents and the Spike Lee's 2020 war drama Da 5 Bloods.

Though primarily a journalist, he was also an ordained minister in the Church of the Disciples of Christ, and worked as a radio and television commentator, public lecturer, and advertising executive. He taught journalism at Howard University and The College of William & Mary, where he sat on the board of trustees.

== Early life ==
Terry was born in New York City and raised in Indianapolis, Indiana, where he was an editor of the Shortridge Daily Echo, one of the few high-school dailies in America. As a reporter for The Brown Daily Herald, he interviewed Orval Faubus, the outspoken segregationist governor of Arkansas, and gained national attention when a photograph of him shaking hands with Faubus hit the front page of The New York Times on September 14, 1957. Later, Terry became the newspaper's editor-in-chief, and the first African American to run an Ivy League newspaper. He did graduate studies in theology as a Rockefeller Fellow at the University of Chicago, and in international relations as a Nieman Fellow at Harvard University.

== Career ==
Terry was hired by The Washington Post in 1958 at the age of 19, becoming the youngest reporter hired by the paper. Three years later, he was hired by Time magazine. In 1967, Terry left for Vietnam, where he became the magazine's deputy bureau chief in Saigon and the first black war correspondent on permanent duty. During his two-year tour, he covered the Tet Offensive, flew scores of combat missions with American and South Vietnamese pilots, and joined assault troops in the A Shau Valley and on Hamburger Hill. He and New Republic correspondent Zalin Grant retrieved the bodies of four newsmen killed by the Viet Cong on May 5, 1968, during the Mini-Tet Offensive in Saigon, following directions from ambush survivor Frank Palmos and New Zealand military personnel.

Terry's Time cover story, "The Negro in Vietnam", was written in 1967 and the book Bloods: An Oral History of the Vietnam War by Black Veterans was published in June 1984. The New York Times wrote that "many of the individuals featured in [the book's] pages speak about their experiences with exceptional candor and passion; and in doing so, give the reader a visceral sense of what it was like, as a black man, to serve in Vietnam and what it was like to come back to 'the real world.'"

Terry wrote and narrated the only documentary recording from the Vietnam battlefields, Guess Who's Coming Home: Black Fighting Men Recorded Live in Vietnam, which was released by Motown in 1972. He wrote and narrated the PBS Frontline show, "The Bloods of Nam".

== Death and legacy ==
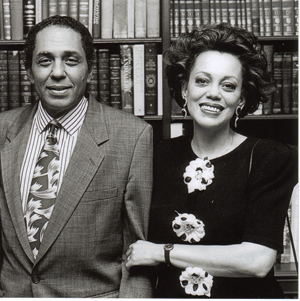
Wallace and Janice Terry

In 2003, Terry developed a rare vascular disease called granulomatosis with polyangiitis, which strikes about one in a million people. The disease can be treated with drugs, but in his case it was diagnosed too late. He died under treatment at a Fairfax, Virginia, hospital on May 29, 2003.

He is survived by his wife of 40 years, Janice Terry (née Jessup), and by their three children: Tai, Lisa, and David, and two grandchildren: Noah and Sophia.

At the time of his death, Terry was working on Missing Pages: Black Journalists of Modern America: An Oral History. The book was published posthumously in June 2007. Cynthia Tucker called it a "treasure trove of history" in the May/June 2007 issue of the Columbia Journalism Review.

== Books ==
- Terry, Wallace (1984). Bloods: An Oral History of the Vietnam War by Black Veterans. Random House. ISBN 0-394-53028-4. (ISBN 978-0-394-53028-4)
- Terry, Wallace (2007). Missing Pages: Black Journalists of Modern America: An Oral History. Basic Books. ISBN 978-0-7867-1993-8. (ISBN 978-0-7867-1993-8)
