= Alan Mcilwraith =

Wikipedia hoaxer from Scotland

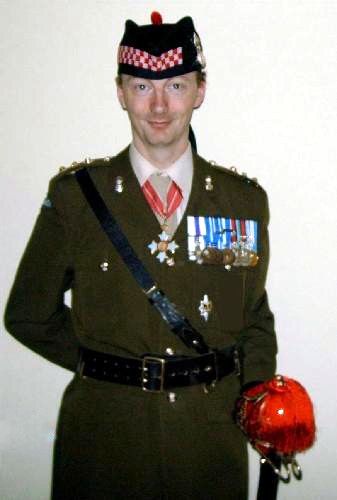
- Mcilwraith in 2005
- Born: March 3, 1978 (age 48); Glasgow
- Occupation: Former call centre worker
- Known for: Being a Military impostor

Alan Mcilwraith (born 3 March 1978) is a Scottish former call centre worker from Glasgow who was exposed as a military impostor by a tabloid newspaper after he passed himself off as a much-decorated British Army officer.

He convinced a number of charities and media outlets that he was "Captain Sir Alan Mcilwraith, KBE, DSO, MC". The National Children's Home charity invited him to the Women of Influence Awards at the Barony Halls. Celebrity magazine No1 carried a picture of him which was captioned "Lady Shona [McLaughlan] and Sir Alan McIlwraith", showing him wearing the dress uniform of the Parachute Regiment with medals.

== Exposure ==
Mcilwraith's double life was exposed by the Scottish tabloid newspaper the Daily Record in an article on 11 April 2006 which described him as "Sir Walter Mitty". The newspaper contacted the British Army and Buckingham Palace during its investigation into Mcilwraith's status, but both denied knowledge of him. An Army spokesperson was quoted by the newspaper as saying, "I can confirm he is a fraud. He has never been an officer, soldier or Army cadet. May I suggest you try the space cadet organisation." Mcilwraith later said that "the lie had just gone too deep, it's like a weed that invades your life. Once it's taken root, there's nothing you can do about it." Mcilwraith had created a fake and misspelled biography of himself at Wikipedia in 2005, describing himself as "a hero that the United Kingdom and NATO can look to in times of trouble".

In December 2007, the Sunday Mail reported that Mcilwraith had reinvented himself as a magician. When confronted by the Sunday Mail, he said: "I've been very stupid. It was all lies and for that I apologise. I should have stopped lying after I got caught last time but I just really wanted to be taken seriously as a magician. I won't ever do this again."

In June 2009, Mcilwraith received fresh coverage in the Daily Record, which reported that he had been passing himself off as a millionaire property tycoon and charity worker to students at Strathclyde University. The paper also claimed that Mcilwraith had asked some students for disclosure documents and taken their National Insurance numbers and other details after duping them into filling in recruitment forms.

When a journalist from the Record met Mcilwraith at Glasgow Central Station, he was wearing "striking blue" contact lenses. Mcilwraith claimed he was working for an agency that housed asylum seekers, denied passing himself off as a student and said that the stories of his latest tall tales had come from students getting confused after too many drinks. He stated: "I have been trying to recruit people for the company I work for but I have not been trying to do anything other than help. It's true I asked one girl about getting a disclosure but I was genuinely trying to help her along too."

== See also ==
- Wikipedia Signpost article describing how the hoax was discovered and removed
- Reliability of Wikipedia – This article looks at some of the issues raised by open content editing.
