= Don Brown (Colorado politician) =

American politician and farmer (born 1954)

Colorado Commissioner of Agriculture
- In office 2015–2018
- Governor-General: John Hickenlooper
- Preceded by: John Salazar
- Succeeded by: Kate Greenberg

Personal details
- Born: December 29, 1954 (age 71) Yuma, Colorado
- Spouse: Peggy Brown
- Education: Northeastern Junior College; Colorado State University
- Profession: Farmer; businessman

Don Brown (born December 29, 1954) is an American politician, farmer, and businessman who served as the commissioner of the Colorado Department of Agriculture from 2015 to 2018. Brown is a third generation farmer from Yuma County, Colorado. During his tenure as Commissioner of Agriculture, he spearheaded the agriculture extension for the Colorado Crisis Hotline.

== Early life and education ==
Don Brown was born in Yuma, Colorado on December 29, 1954, where he was then raised on a family farm. He attended Yuma High School and graduated there in 1973. Brown was then elected Colorado Future Farmers of America (FFA) president, serving from 1973 through 1974.

Brown enrolled at Northeastern Junior College (NJC) in 1974. At NJC, he served as president of the Associated Student Government from 1975 to 1976. He graduated from NJC with a degree in agriculture, then transferred his credits to Colorado State University. At CSU, Brown graduated with honors in vocational agriculture education.

During his time at CSU, Brown was a legislative intern for Colorado Senate president Fred E. Anderson.

== Colorado Commissioner of Agriculture ==
In January 2015, Colorado governor John Hickenlooper, appointed Brown to his cabinet to be the commissioner of the Colorado Department of Agriculture (CDA). The Colorado Senate approved the appointment of Brown on Feb. 17, 2015. The appointment came after John Salazar retired from the commissioner role in early 2015. Brown completed his tenure as Governor Hickenlooper completed his final term, in 2018.

At the Colorado Department of Agriculture, Brown spearheaded a program to train Colorado Crisis Services operators how to help agriculturalists that were experiencing a mental health crisis. His work in the mental health space was honored with the 2018 Tribute Honorary Chair for Mental Health Colorado. Brown also served as president of the 13-state Western United States Agricultural Trade Association and vice chair for the Food Regulatory Committee for the National Association of State Departments of Agriculture.

In August 2017, Don's CDA and Colorado Proud launched "Faces and Stories of Colorado's Agriculture." The program was created to help Coloradans "feel more connected to farmers and their food sources." Panels and other outreach strategies were sent out across the state to display and discuss agriculture realities.

== Farming ==
Brown is a third-generation farmer, just southeast of Yuma, Colorado. He took over the operation of the farm and ranch after the accidental death of his father in 1993. Since assuming management of the operation, the Browns have expanded their family operation tenfold. Brown's practices have led him to serving as the president of the Yuma County Cattlemen’s Association and his farm being named the Yuma Soil Conservation Outstanding Conservationists in 1999.

Brown's farming has led him down business paths and ventures that turned into successful businesses. He is the founder of Pivotal Fencing Systems, which developed two patents for their technologies. Brown was also an early participant in horizontal drilling, forming Anchor Production LLC to develop and purchase oil and gas projects.
