= B. G. Burkett =

American military officer and writer

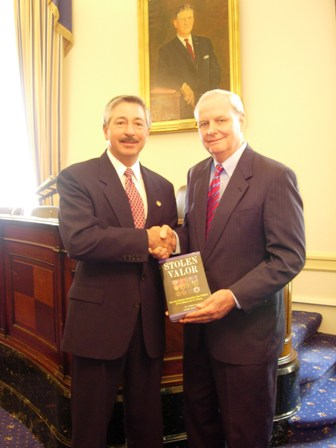
- Burkett (right) with U.S. Rep. John Salazar
- Born: Bernard Gary Burkett
- Writing career
- Pen name: B.G. Burkett
- Notable work: Stolen Valor

B.G. Burkett is a retired Army officer and financial advisor. He is best known as co-author of the self-published book Stolen Valor (1998), written with journalist Glenna Whitley. It received the Colby Award for military writers in 2000.

== Early life ==
Burkett was the son of an air force colonel and his wife, and grew up on military bases. As a child, he felt his "heroes were not sports figures like Mickey Mantle and Willie Mays but the fighter pilots who had blasted the Luftwaffe out of the sky". Burkett states that life on a military base imbued in him "an understanding that the military was the guardian of the freedoms enjoyed by the civilian population."

== Career ==
As a young man, Burkett enlisted in the U.S. Army in June 1966. He joined the 199th Infantry Brigade and fought in the Vietnam War. After returning from the war, he started a career in finance. Burkett has a Master of Business Administration degree.

Burkett says he decided to write the book now known as Stolen Valor after hearing too many news reports about Vietnam veterans characterized as mentally unstable. Burkett began fact-checking whether such identified people were veterans by applying for their military records through Freedom of information process.

Burkett says he checked over 3,500 people's claims to have served in Vietnam, and found 1,700 of them had fabricated their stories.

According to the Columbia Journalism Review, the self-published Stolen Valor gained a "cult status" among military members. The book was awarded the Colby Award in 2000. It has been credited for inspiring the Stolen Valor Act of 2005 passed by Congress, making it a crime for an individual to falsely claim to have been awarded military medals.

Burkett was instrumental in returning a man named Joe Yandle to prison. Yandle, who was serving a life-sentence for killing a liquor store attendant during a robbery in 1972, had claimed he had turned to drugs and crime after returning scarred from two tours of duty in Vietnam. Yandle's story was covered by Mike Wallace for 60 Minutes. Sympathy for his account was credited with his gaining a commutation of his sentence and being released on parole. While researching his book, Burkett learned that, while Yandle had served in the military, he had never been deployed to Vietnam. Burkett took his evidence to 60 Minutes, who subsequently re-interviewed Yandle. After the veteran admitted he had lied about Vietnam, his parole was revoked in August 1998 and he returned to prison.

In 2005, Burkett co-authored a paper with B.C. Frueh, J.D. Elhai, and J.D. Monnier that was published in the British Journal of Psychiatry. It focused on concerns "regarding the validity of combat exposure reports of veterans seeking treatment for combat-related post-traumatic stress disorder".

== See also ==
- Stolen Valor Act of 2013

== Bibliography ==
- Burkett, B.G., and Glenna Whitley. Stolen Valor: How the Vietnam Generation Was Robbed of Its Heroes and Its History. Dallas: Verity Press, 1998. ISBN 0-9667036-0-X (self-published)
