= Jesse Macbeth =

Veteran impostor

Jesse Adam Al-Zaid (born March 21, 1984; name changed from Jesse Adam Macbeth in 1986) is an American anti-war protester, author, and military imposter, who was convicted of falsely claiming to be an Army Ranger and veteran of the Iraq War. In alternative media interviews, Macbeth fabricated claims that he and his unit routinely committed war crimes in Iraq. Transcripts of the video were made in English and Arabic. According to the U.S. Army, there is no record of Macbeth being a Ranger.

On September 21, 2007, Macbeth admitted in federal court that he had faked his war record. U.S. Attorney Jeffrey Sullivan declared that Macbeth had been in the Army for just 44 days and had been dismissed as unfit.

== Allegations and other claims ==
Macbeth alleged Iraq war atrocities in interviews posted to the Internet as web pages and video. He was featured in the 2006 PepperSpray Productions video, posted at Peacefilms.org, Jessie Macbeth: Former Army Ranger and Iraq War Veteran. A link to the video was posted May 21, 2006, on the community blog Metafilter.

Iraq Veterans Against the War (IVAW) has since required documentation of service in order to protect its members from frauds such as Macbeth. PepperSpray removed the video from its site on May 23, 2006, after U.S. Army spokesman John Boyce said Macbeth had never been a U.S. Army Ranger. PepperSpray Productions later issued a statement of retraction, noting "when we learned that Macbeth's service records were fraudulent, we immediately pulled the video and are no longer distributing it." Transcripts of the video were made in English and Arabic.

Various problems were reported. Macbeth's uniform as worn in the video was inconsistent with Army regulations or inconsistent with his purported identity. U.S. Army spokesman Boyce said, "There are... numerous wear and appearance issues with the soldier's uniform – a mix of foreign uniforms with the sleeves rolled up like a Marine and a badly floppy tan beret worn like a pastry chef", and he wore his beret with the insignia over the wrong eye.

=== Eastern Arizona Courier article ===
On November 3, 2003, Pam Crandall, a reporter for the Eastern Arizona Courier, interviewed Macbeth. In the interview he reportedly made false claims that he had returned from Iraq two and a half months prior – roughly in late August 2003, after sustaining a back injury. The article quoted Macbeth falsely stating he had been shot in the back by an M16 rifle while in an Iraqi tunnel, but that a Canadian nurse stitched him up and he continued fighting. Canada was not a participant in the Multinational force in Iraq at the time of the article's publication.

The article states that Macbeth falsely claims to have attended a hearing that month, about a medical discharge from the Army, alleging he had undergone surgeries to remove shrapnel from his back. Macbeth falsely claimed in the article that "The Iraqis would stand in a crowd and shoot at us. We had to kill civilians to get to them because we were ordered to shoot anything that came at us. I keep having nightmares about it." The EA Courier later ran a story detailing Macbeth's fraudulent claims.

== Army service and afterwards ==
The first known media report of Macbeth representing himself as an Iraq war veteran was the Eastern Arizona Courier article. An April 6, 2004, Arizona Indymedia article places him at the center of a dispute at a coffee shop near a campus of Arizona State University. Macbeth alleged that he was asked to leave the shop because he was wearing his uniform. The dispute eventually became a protest, covered in articles and editorials by the Arizona State University student newspaper, The State Press.

An April 23, 2004, guest editorial attributed to Macbeth also appeared in The State Press about the protest and dispute, claiming he had already spent 16 months in Iraq. The war had only begun 13 months earlier at that point. The writer asserted he was about to be redeployed. On September 28, 2004, Macbeth was convicted of fraudulent use of a credit card in Graham County (Arizona) Superior Court. Court records pertaining to the case also indicate parole activity through May 2006.

Macbeth joined Iraq Veterans Against the War in January 2006, and represented, or was scheduled to represent them on several occasions. The group publicly severed ties with Macbeth on May 27, 2006, stating "... Jesse is not what he represented himself to be."

On May 23, 2006, Pierce County, Washington Superior Court issued a bench warrant for Jesse Adam Macbeth, underlying charges of violating a protective court order and fourth degree assault.

== In custody ==
Macbeth had a warrant issued against him, pursuant to which he was apprehended and booked on November 16, 2006. The Pierce County Legal Information Network Exchange lists 2 counts of felony domestic violence court order violation (held on $20,000 cash or bail bonds), 2 counts of assault in the fourth degree ($5,000 cash-only bail, as well as being committed to custody) and 2 counts "other concurrent assault in the fourth degree charges", and interfering with the reporting of domestic violence (committed to custody).

== Charge and guilty plea ==
On May 18, 2007, a criminal complaint was unsealed in the United States District Court in Seattle, Washington, charging Macbeth with one count of using or possessing a forged or altered military discharge certificate and one count of making false statements in seeking benefits from the Veterans Administration. The complaint alleged that Macbeth had posed as an Iraq war veteran and illicitly collected more than $10,400 in benefits.

On June 7, 2007, Macbeth pleaded guilty to one count of making false statements to the U.S. Department of Veterans Affairs. He was sentenced on September 21, 2007, to 5 months in jail and three years' probation.
