= Colorado State Fair =

Annual event

Coordinates: 38°14′57″N 104°38′21″W

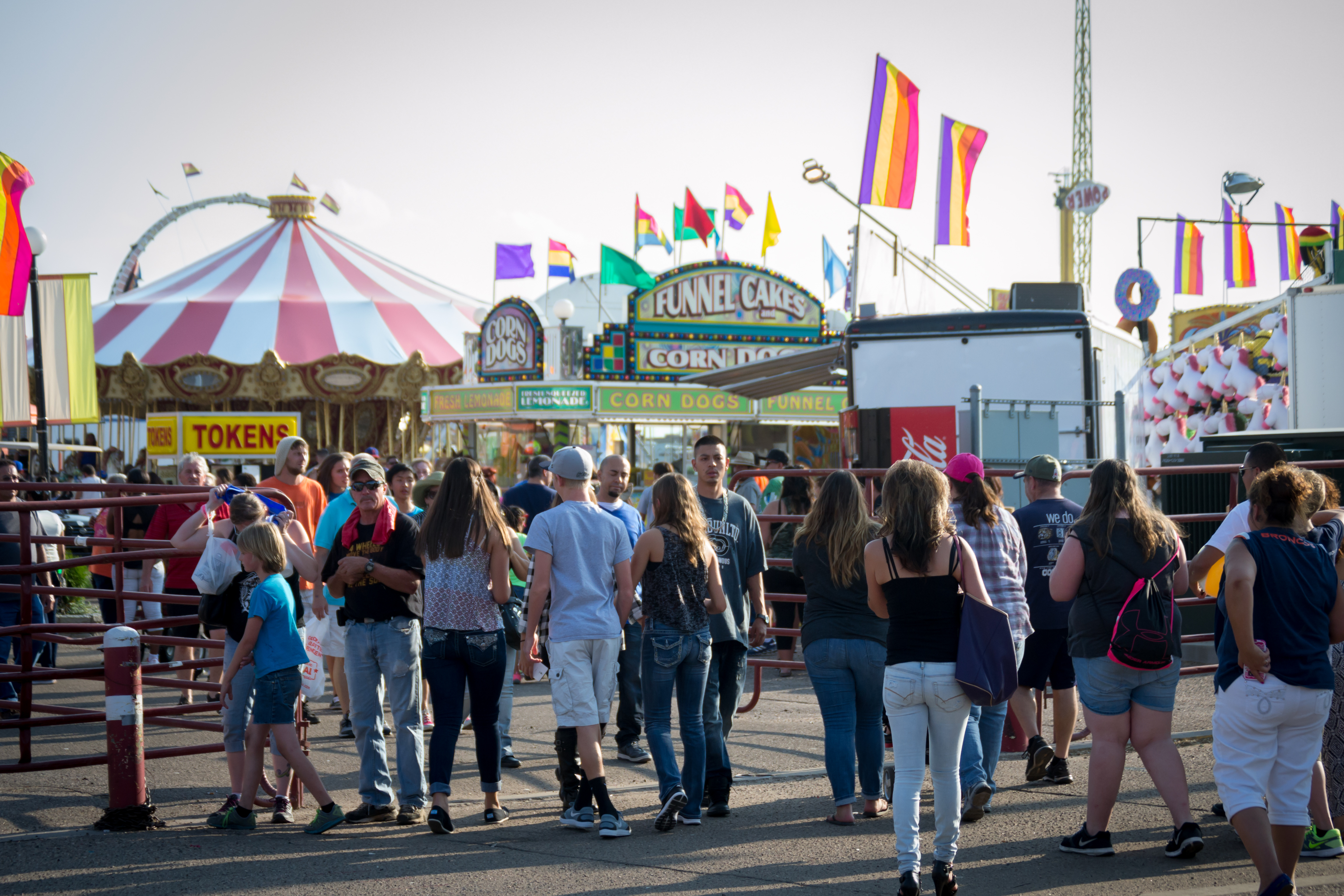
- Colorado State Fair in 2015
- Genre: State fair
- Frequency: Annual
- Locations: Pueblo, Colorado
- Years active: 154
- Inaugurated: October 9, 1872
- Most recent: August 28–September 7, 2026
- Website: coloradostatefair.com

The Colorado State Fair is an event held annually in late August in Pueblo, Colorado. The state fair has been a tradition since October 9, 1872.

The fairgrounds also host a number of other events during the rest of the year. Organizationally, the fair is one of the divisions of the Colorado Department of Agriculture.

== History ==
When Colorado became a state in 1876, its state fair was already earning its place in history. In 1869, approximately two thousand people converged on what is now Pueblo for a horse exhibition; from that meager beginning was born the Colorado State Fair.

There were cancellations in 1917–18 and 1942–45 due to World War I and World War II, respectively.

In 2011, the grand champion goat shown by Colorado State University student Maggie Weinroth was disqualified after failing a drug test. Ractopamine was found by doing tests on the urine, blood, and tissues of the goat. The Weinroth family appealed the decision, claiming the goat ingested a large amount of a foreign feed mixture overnight before the fair. After months of fighting, the Weinroth family won their battle with the fair in March 2012.

In November 2019, the Colorado State Fair was audited by the Colorado General Assembly. As reported in local media, the audit found that the Fair had lost money for the previous 21 years in a row, with deficits averaging $4 million per year between 2014 and 2018.

2020 saw drive-thru fair food and limited exhibitions due to the COVID-19 pandemic.

== See also ==
- Colorado Department of Agriculture
