= List of countries that prohibit camouflage clothing =

Map showing camouflage clothing prohibition

The following nations prohibit civilians wearing or possessing camouflage print clothing:

- Antigua and Barbuda
- Azerbaijan (only military uniforms are illegal, camouflage patterns on civilian clothing is permitted)
- Barbados
- Dominica
- Ghana
- Grenada
- Guyana
- Jamaica
- Madagascar
- Nigeria
- Oman
- Philippines (uniforms only)
- Saint Lucia
- Saint Kitts and Nevis
- Saint Vincent and the Grenadines
- Saudi Arabia
- Trinidad and Tobago
- Uganda
- Zambia
- Zimbabwe

== See also ==
- Police impersonation
- Military impostor
- Swiftboating, slang for an unfair or untrue political attack, which sometimes takes the form of falsely accusing a candidate of dishonesty about military service.
- Military uniform
  - Full dress uniform
  - Mess dress uniform
  - Service dress uniform
  - Combat uniform
    - Physical training uniform
