= John Salazar =

American politician (born 1953)

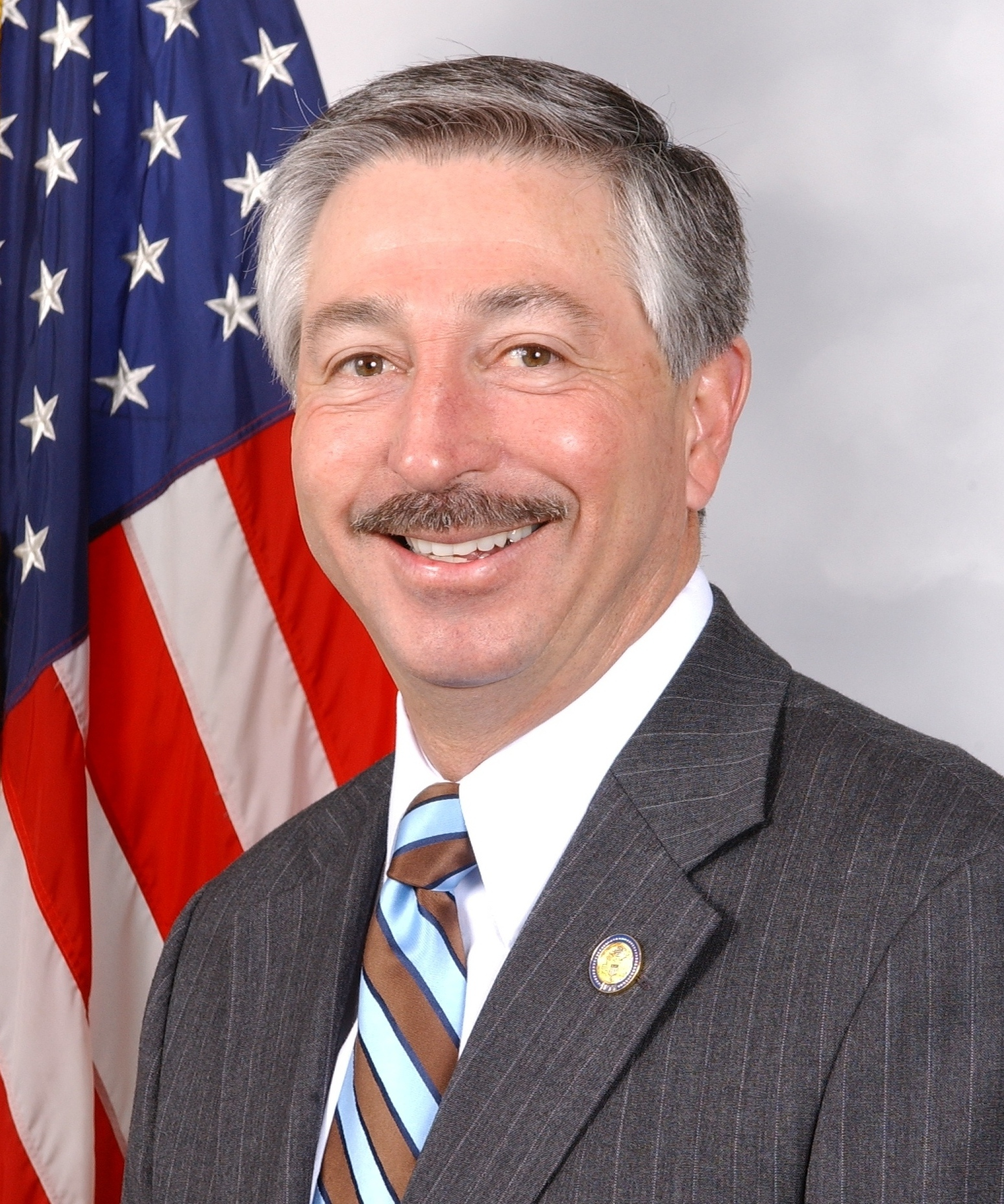

Agriculture Commissioner of Colorado
- In office January 6, 2011 – December 31, 2014
- Governor: John Hickenlooper
- Preceded by: John Stulp
- Succeeded by: Don Brown

Member of the U.S. House of Representatives from Colorado's 3rd district
- In office January 3, 2005 – January 3, 2011
- Preceded by: Scott McInnis
- Succeeded by: Scott Tipton

Member of the Colorado House of Representatives from the 62nd district
- In office January 8, 2003 – January 3, 2005
- Preceded by: Glenn Scott
- Succeeded by: Rafael Lopez Gallegos

Personal details
- Born: John Tony Salazar; July 21, 1953 (age 73) Alamosa, Colorado, U.S.
- Party: Democratic
- Spouse: Mary Lou Salazar
- Children: 3
- Relatives: Ken Salazar (brother)
- Education: Adams State University (BS)

Military service
- Branch/service: United States Army
- Years of service: 1973–1976
- Unit: Army Criminal Investigation Division

John Tony Salazar (born July 21, 1953) is an American politician who served as the U.S. representative for Colorado's 3rd congressional district from 2005 until 2011. A member of the Democratic Party, he was appointed Commissioner of the Colorado Department of Agriculture in the Cabinet of Governor John Hickenlooper in 2011, following his electoral defeat in 2010. Salazar announced his retirement as Agriculture Commissioner in November 2014.

== Early life, education and career ==
Salazar was born in Alamosa, Colorado, the son of Emma M. (Montoya) and Henry (Enrique) S. Salazar. His younger brother is former Senator Ken Salazar.

Salazar served in the U.S. Army from 1973 to 1976, and is a farmer and rancher. His formal education includes a Bachelor of Science degree in business administration from Adams State College in 1981. Salazar was the owner of an internet company, Spudseed.com, which marketed potatoes, as well as serving as a director of Monte Vista Production Credit Union and Agro Engineering, Inc.

Salazar served on several Colorado public bodies including the Governor's Economic Development Advisory Board, the Rio Grande Water Conservation District and the Colorado Agricultural Leadership Forum. He also served on the Colorado Agricultural Commission from 1999 to 2002 before being elected to the Colorado House of Representatives from 2003 until 2004.

== U.S. House of Representatives ==
=== Committee assignments ===
- Committee on Appropriations
  - Subcommittee on Energy and Water Development
  - Subcommittee on Military Construction, Veterans Affairs, and Related Agencies
- Select Committee on Energy Independence and Global Warming

== Political positions ==
Salazar was concerned with water rights in particular. He said his top priority on Capitol Hill was to ensure that water derived from the snow melt of Colorado's Western Slope would stay in his district instead of being sent to California or Nevada.

Though a Democrat, he exhibited conservative leanings. He opposed expanding gun control and supported permanent repeal of the inheritance tax and lower taxes. He also supports allowing Americans to buy cheaper prescription drugs from Canada. He was a member of the conservative Blue Dog Democrats, leading him to oppose Democratic priority measures such as the Emergency Economic Stabilization Act of 2008 and the American Clean Energy and Security Act in 2009. During consideration of the Affordable Care Act, he voted in favor of the Stupak Amendment restricting federal funding of elective abortions. However, he also voted for the Senate version of the health care bill lacking the Stupak Amendment language.

As a veteran, a son of a veteran, and father of a child serving in the Colorado National Guard as of 2004, Salazar was also vocal against cuts to veterans' benefits. Salazar introduced the Stolen Valor Act of 2005, designed to protect the integrity of medals, to the House of Representatives, which he has cited as his best achievement in politics.

Salazar was considered for the post of Secretary of Agriculture by Barack Obama but Tom Vilsack was chosen instead.

== Political campaigns ==
=== 2004 ===
Salazar was first elected to the United States House of Representatives in 2004. His election to succeed retiring Republican Scott McInnis was one of the most contested House elections of the year. Salazar defeated Greg Walcher who had attacked Salazar as being soft on illegal immigration, while Salazar criticised Walcher for his previous support of a failed 2003 referendum which he said would have diverted water from the district, an important issue in western Colorado. In a year when Republicans made gains, John Salazar was only one of three Democratic pick-up seats in the House of Representatives.

=== 2006 ===
John Salazar was re-elected in 2006 after his first term in Congress defeating Republican Scott Tipton. John Salazar raised almost three times as much money as Tipton and won over 60% of the vote, including more Republican areas of the district. Salazar had campaigned as a moderate, middle of the road candidate, with the opinion polls having shown him ahead in the election.

=== 2008 ===
Salazar won in 2008 with a similar margin as 2006 defeating rancher and county commissioner Wayne Wolf. Salazar had a massive fundraising advantage over Wolf who only had about $16,000 for the campaign.

=== 2010 ===
Salazar was defeated for re-election by Republican Scott Tipton. Tipton had unsuccessfully challenged Salazar in 2006. Libertarian Gregory Gilman and Independent Jake Segrest were also on the ballot; Independents John W. Hargis, Sr. and James Fritz qualified as write-in candidates.

== Electoral history ==
Colorado's 3rd congressional district: Results 2004–2010
Year	Democrat	Votes	Pct	Republican	Votes	Pct	3rd Party	Party	Votes	Pct		3rd Party	Party	Votes	Pct
2004	John Salazar	153,500	50.9%	Greg Walcher	141,376	46.9%	Jim Krug	Independent	6,770	2.2%	*				
2006	John Salazar	146,488	61.6%	Scott Tipton	86,930	36.5%	Bert Sargent	Libertarian	4,417	1.9%		Bruce Lohmiller	Green (Write-in)	23	0.01%
2008	John Salazar	196,214	61.4%	Wayne Wolf	123,346	38.6%									
2010	John Salazar	118,048	45.8%	Scott Tipton	129,257	50.1%									

== Personal life ==
Salazar is married to Mary Lou Salazar and has three children: Esteban, Miguel and Jesus. They live in Manassa, Colorado.

Salazar's younger brother, Ken Salazar, is a former United States Senator from Colorado and the former Secretary of the Interior appointed by President Barack Obama.

== See also ==
- List of Hispanic Americans in the United States Congress

== Popular culture ==
John Salazar is briefly mentioned at the very beginning of the video game Outlast, on the radio of the protagonist's vehicle.

U.S. House of Representatives
Preceded by Scott McInnis	Member of the U.S. House of Representatives from Colorado's 3rd congressional district 2005–2011	Succeeded by Scott Tipton
Political offices
Preceded by John Stulp	Agriculture Commissioner of Colorado; 2011–2014	Succeeded by Don Brown
U.S. order of precedence (ceremonial)
Preceded by Marilyn Musgrave as Former U.S. Representative	Order of precedence of the United States as Former U.S. Representative	Succeeded by Stephanie Herseth Sandlin as Former U.S. Representative
