= Delmart Vreeland =

American criminal (born 1966)

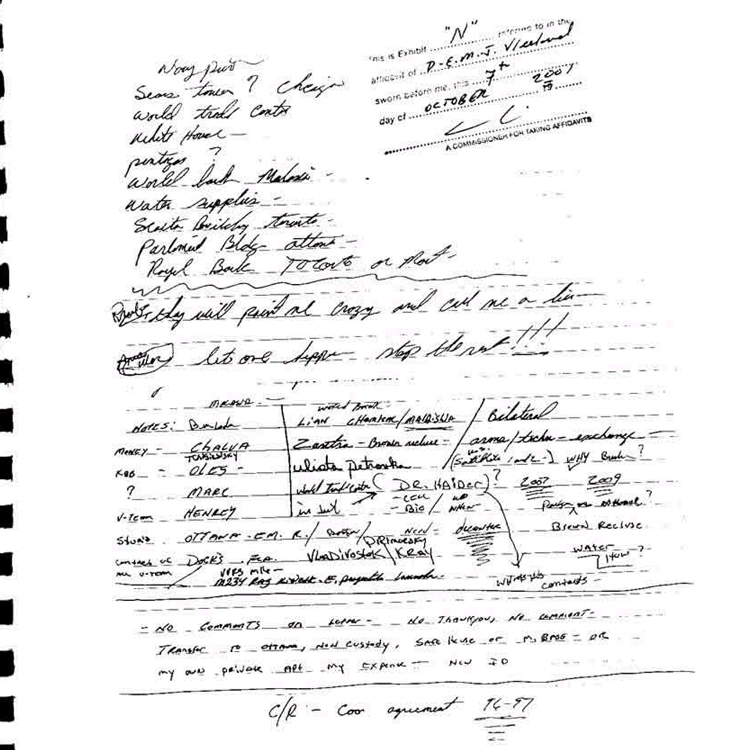
Delmart Vreeland note.

Delmart "Mike" Vreeland (born March 20, 1966, in Mason, Michigan) became notable for claiming to predict the events of September 11, 2001.

== Biography ==
Vreeland, wanted by police in eight Michigan jurisdictions for the crimes of fraud and burglary was arrested in Iowa's Franklin County on October 20, 2004. According to Sheriff's Deputies, Vreeland ran an identity theft ring in the Detroit area for a few years and had felony convictions for breaking and entering and receiving stolen property. Shortly after the September 11 attacks, Vreeland apparently claimed that he wrote a note that foreshadowed those events while he was in prison.

Vreeland is reported to be a folk hero among conspiracy theorists who believe he is a spy for the Office of Naval Intelligence. Government officials denied that Vreeland ever served in the Navy. Vreeland's various claims have included knowing the cause of death of a Canadian Embassy employee before it was officially released, working as an undercover American naval officer, and being the victim of a conspiracy of government officials attempting to keep him quiet. Police officers have reportedly characterized Vreeland as "a skilled con".

In 2008, Vreeland was sentenced in Colorado to 336 years to life in prison after he was convicted of inducement of child prostitution, sexual assault, sexual exploitation of children and distribution of cocaine following his luring of two boys to perform sexual acts on-camera in exchange for cocaine, money and the promise of a drum kit.
