= Jack Livesey (impostor) =

British military imposter (born 1954)

John Livesey (born 15 May 1954) is a British military imposter who posed as a decorated war hero; in actuality he served in the army as a cook for three years. His fabricated military record included twenty years in the Parachute Regiment, fighting with the 2nd Battalion in the Falklands War, serving five tours of duty in Northern Ireland, receiving the Military Medal and reaching the rank of Colour Sergeant. He has worked as a historian, author, consultant, lecturer and battlefield tour guide on the basis of his alleged military experience.

== Career ==
Jack Livesey served as a chef in the Army Catering Corps from December 1971 until April 1974, when he was discharged following an apparent suicide attempt in which he threw himself from a window. He began to lie about his military service while in the psychiatric hospital at Netley Hospital, where he was found to have a hysterical personality disorder.

Livesey was featured as a military historian in the documentary Death and Destruction in the Falaise Gap and on the History Channel series Battlefield Detectives. He worked as a historical adviser on the 2005 BBC documentary series D-Day to Berlin and the 2006 movie Flyboys. He claimed to have also advised production crews on the miniseries Band of Brothers and the movie Saving Private Ryan.

Livesey worked at the Imperial War Museum Duxford for seven years, first as a volunteer and later as a collections assistant, until he resigned in 2006. He defended the sinking of the ARA General Belgrano during an exhibition at the museum marking the 20th anniversary of the Falklands War, and he was a guest of honour at the museum's 25th anniversary commemorations of the Falklands War, where he was interviewed by BBC Look East.

== Criminal convictions ==
In 2004 Jack Livesey was convicted of benefit fraud for receiving nearly £30,000 in incapacity benefit while he was employed at the Imperial War Museum. He was sentenced to a suspended twelve-month jail term due to his supposed military record, and character references submitted by veterans including Air Commodore Peter Thorne and Major Gordon Corrigan, who knew Livesey and believed him to be a war hero.

Livesey was exposed as an impostor when investigations following his conviction found that the references submitted by the veterans were based on false claims that Livesey had made to them. He was subsequently charged with perverting the course of justice by police, and admitted to lying about his army career, but denied he was aware the references were submitted. His partner, Bridget Pollard, testified that she had compiled the references.

In mitigation, Livesey's attorney stated that his client had been diagnosed with dependent and histrionic personality disorder, and argued these disorders impaired his client's ability to tell fact from fiction. Livesey was found guilty, sentenced to three years in jail and was ordered to pay £3,500 in prosecution costs. He filed an appeal on the grounds that his sentence was excessive. The appeal was denied.

== Bibliography ==
- Jack Livesey (16 May 2006). The World Encyclopedia of Armoured Fighting Vehicles. Lorenz Books. ISBN 978-0-75481-580-8.
- Jack Livesey; George Forty (11 January 2007). The World Encyclopedia of Tanks and Armored Fighting Vehicles. Anness Publishing. ISBN 978-0-75481-741-3.
- Jack Livesey (21 September 2007). Armoured Fighting Vehicles of World Wars I and II. Southwater. ISBN 978-1-84476-370-2.
- Jack Livesey (18 March 2008). Modern Armored Fighting Vehicles: From 1946 to the Present Day. Southwater. ISBN 978-1-84476-462-4.
- Jack Livesey (1 March 2011). Death in the Falaise Gap: A Reappraisal of Normandy 1944. The History Press. ISBN 978-0-75244-855-8.
- Jack Livesey; George Forty (16 September 2012). The Complete Guide to Tanks and Armoured Fighting Vehicles. Southwater. ISBN 978-1-78019-164-5.
- Jack Livesey; George Forty (7 November 2014). A Complete Illustrated Guide to Tanks & Armoured Fighting Vehicles. Lorenz Books. ISBN 978-0-75482-926-3.

== Other media ==
A stock photo featuring Livesey is on Alamy. The caption reads 'Former paratrooper Jack Livesey, 47, from Sawston, Cambridge, views a new exhibition marking the 20th anniversary of the start of the Falklands War, at the Imperial War Museum's aviation section at Duxford near Cambridge.'
