= Colorado Department of Agriculture =

State agency of Colorado, United States

Department of Agriculture

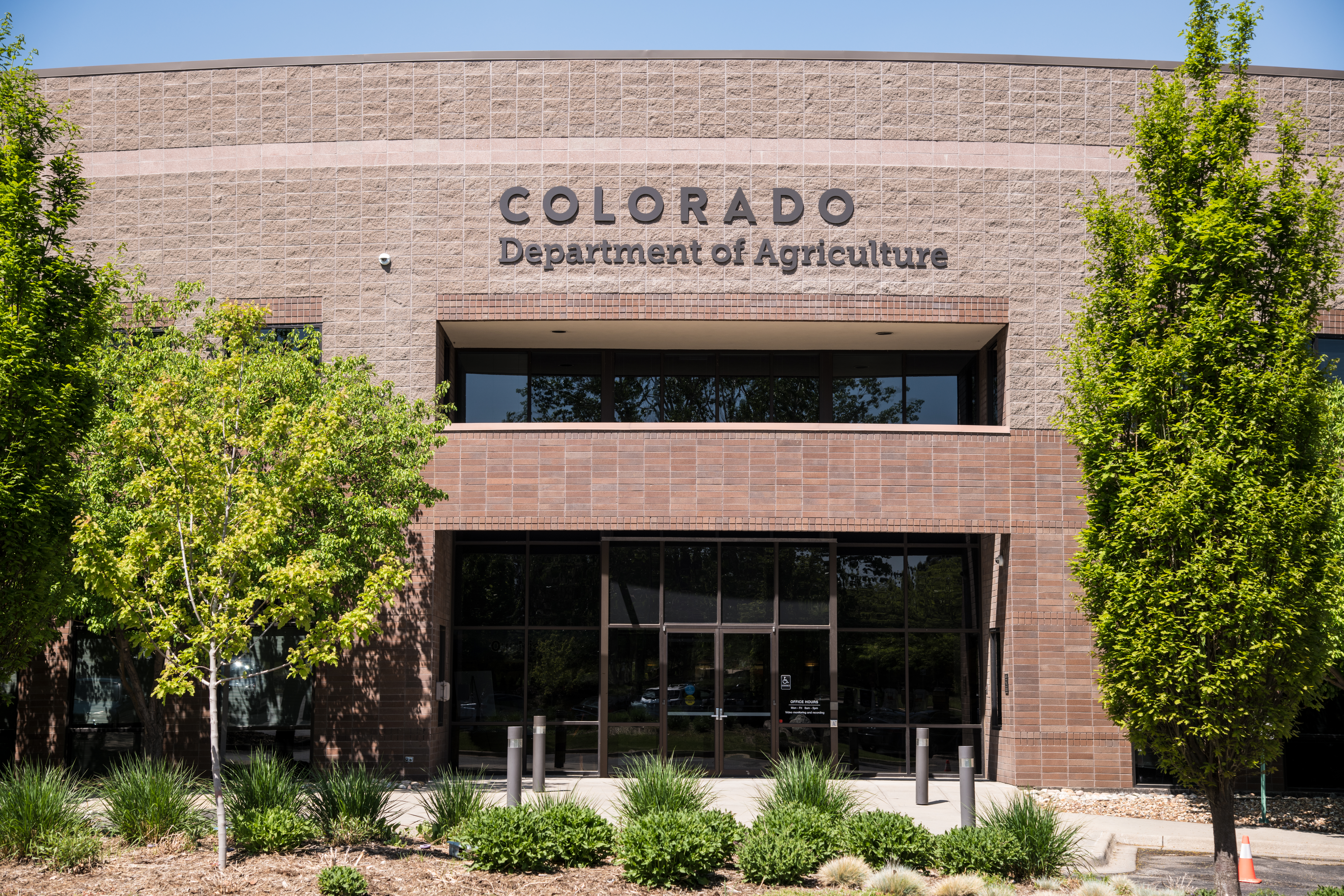
- Headquarters in Broomfield

Department overview
- Jurisdiction: Colorado
- Headquarters: 305 Interlocken Parkway, Broomfield, Colorado 80021
- Department executive: Kate Greenberg, Commissioner of Agriculture
- Website: ag.colorado.gov

The Colorado Department of Agriculture is the principal department of the Colorado state government that manages agriculture, food safety, agriculture-related consumer protection, and conservation districts. Kate Greenberg was appointed as Commissioner of the Department in 2019, replacing Don Brown, who retired after serving since 2015.

== Organization ==
The department is organized into these divisions:

- Animal Health Division
- Brands Division
- Colorado State Fair
- Commissioner's Office
- Conservation Services Division
- Inspection & Consumer Services Division
- Markets Division
- Plant Industry Division
- Division of Laboratory Services
- Division of Animal Welfare

The commissioner serves as a non-voting member of the board of directors of the Colorado Agricultural Development Authority (CADA), created in 1981 to make financing available for farmers and other agricultural enterprises due to the high cost and lack of available agricultural loans, and the insufficiency of gainful employment in rural areas. The commissioner has had a nonvoting ex-officio seat on the Colorado Parks and Wildlife Commission.

CADA board members are ex officio members (the commissioner is a non-voting member) of the Colorado Agricultural Value-Added Board (CAVADB), which make grants, loans, loan guarantees and equity investments concerning rural Colorado. The Colorado State Conservation Board (CSCB) is composed of representatives of Colorado's ten watersheds, representing Colorado's seventy-six conservation districts.
