= U.S. Military Awards for Valor =

U.S. government website

- Website type: U.S. Federal Government
- Available in: English
- Owner: U.S. Department of Defense
- Website: valor.defense.gov
- Registration: U.S. Department of Defense
- Launched: 25 July 2012; 14 years ago

U.S. Military Awards for Valor is a website published by the United States Department of Defense established in 2012 to track recipients of awards and decorations of the United States military. It currently contains the complete list of Medal of Honor recipients for actions since the September 11, 2001 attacks.

Created in response to the U.S. Supreme Court striking down the Stolen Valor Act of 2005, the website is designed to deter people from falsely claiming to have been awarded military decorations for valor. It was launched on 25 July 2012 and initially contained only a small number of entries, but eventually The Pentagon hopes to expand it to become much more comprehensive.

== Background ==
On 28 June 2012, the United States Supreme Court struck down the Stolen Valor Act of 2005, an act which installed criminal penalties on persons making false claims about being awarded valor awards for service in the United States military. In the ruling, the members of the court wrote they saw the act as a violation of the First Amendment of the United States Constitution. Several U.S. lawmakers, including members of the Senate Armed Services Committee, sought to reinstall penalties for lying about awards, and officials at The Pentagon began an internal review of alternatives, namely creating a website to track all awards. The U.S. military does not have a single database of valor awards on its own, as such awards are typically managed locally within units, where the records and documents are kept. Privately run databases such as the "Military Times Hall of Valor" exist with documents of decorations of 100,000 servicemembers, and some military organizations do keep comprehensive data on the numbers of awards received, notably the U.S. Army Human Resources Command, though it does not identify the names of individual recipients. In its decision to strike down the Stolen Valor Act, the Supreme Court suggested such a database be created.

It may no longer be a crime for con artists to pass themselves off as heroes, but one thing is certain — it is contemptible. So this week, we will launch a new website, a living memorial, so the American people can see who's been awarded our nation's highest honors. Because no American hero should ever have their valor stolen.

— U.S. President Barack Obama announcing the creation of valor.defense.gov

For several years prior to the announcement, U.S. military officials had ruled out an online database of valor awards as impractical. A 2009 Pentagon review noted such a database would not be viable, in part because of the 1973 National Archives fire which destroyed documentation of many servicemembers' decorations, as well as privacy concerns, which would limit the use of certain information on such a site, such as date of birth and Social Security numbers of each recipient. Officials said this information would be necessary for full confirmation of the awards. In its decision to strike down the Stolen Valor Act, the Supreme Court suggested such a database be created. As recently as 5 July 2012, military officials continued to maintain that such a database would be impractical, but five days later on July 10, officials announced they were considering the idea.

On 23 July 2012, President Barack Obama announced the database would be created within a few days, hosted at valor.defense.gov, in an effort to reduce the number of fraudulent award claims. White House officials said this website would not affect congressional efforts to introduce new legislation to replace the Stolen Valor Act, only that it would make it easier for people to verify award recipients online, but that it was a direct response to the Stolen Valor Act being struck down. The website launched on 25 July 2012.

== Contents and scope ==
On the day of its launch, the site contained only 10 entries; the 10 U.S. servicemembers (Note: These included Paul R. Smith, Jason Dunham, Michael A. Monsoor, and Ross A. McGinnis from the Iraq War, and Michael P. Murphy, Jared C. Monti, Salvatore Giunta, Robert James Miller, Leroy Petry and Dakota Meyer from the War in Afghanistan.) who had been awarded the Medal of Honor for actions since the September 11, 2001 attacks, and included only each recipient's name, rank, and the campaign in which they received the decoration.

The Department of Defense has stated it intends to expand the database to eventually include all recipients of the Distinguished Service Cross, Navy Cross and Air Force Cross since 11 September 2001. They also hope to include recipients of the Silver Star Medal as well. Staffers are considering compiling information for awards presented before 11 September 2001, but have said a 1973 fire at a records center in St. Louis that destroyed millions of servicemembers' files would make such efforts difficult. They also noted awards prior to that time often have far less documentation, making them more difficult to independently verify.
