= United States v. Alvarez =

US Supreme Court decision (2012)

- Supreme Court of the United States

Argued February 22, 2012 Decided June 28, 2012
- Full case name: United States, Petitioner v. Xavier Alvarez
- Docket no.: 11-210
- Citations: 567 U.S. 709 (more) 132 S. Ct. 2537; 183 L. Ed. 2d 574; 2012 U.S. LEXIS 4879
- Argument: Oral argument

Case history
- Prior: Defendant's motion for dismissal rejected, unreported, n° CR-07-1035-RGK (C.D. Cal. 2008); reversed and remanded, 617 F.3d 1198 (9th Cir., 2009); rehearing en banc denied, 638 F.3d 666 (9th Cir., 2011); certiorari granted 565 U.S. ___

Holding
- The Stolen Valor Act of 2005 (18 U.S.C. 704) is unconstitutional because it violates the First Amendment. United States Court of Appeals for the Ninth Circuit affirmed.

Court membership
- Chief Justice John Roberts Associate Justices Antonin Scalia · Anthony Kennedy; Clarence Thomas · Ruth Bader Ginsburg; Stephen Breyer · Samuel Alito; Sonia Sotomayor · Elena Kagan

Case opinions
- Plurality: Kennedy, joined by Roberts, Ginsburg, Sotomayor
- Concurrence: Breyer (in judgment), joined by Kagan
- Dissent: Alito, joined by Scalia, Thomas

Laws applied
- U.S. Const. amend. I; Stolen Valor Act of 2005

United States v. Alvarez, 567 U.S. 709 (2012), is a landmark decision in which the Supreme Court of the United States ruled that the Stolen Valor Act of 2005 was unconstitutional. The Stolen Valor Act of 2005 was a federal law that criminalized false statements about having a military medal. It had been passed by Congress as an effort to stem instances where people falsely claimed to have earned the medal in an attempt to protect the valor of legitimate recipients. A 6–3 majority of the Supreme Court agreed that the law was unconstitutional and violated the free speech protections under the First Amendment. Despite reaffirming the opinion that was previously issued by the Ninth Circuit, it could not agree on a single rationale. Four justices concluded that a statement's falsity is not enough, by itself, to exclude speech from First Amendment protection. Another two justices concluded that while false statements were entitled to some protection, the Stolen Valor Act of 2005 was invalid because it could have achieved its objectives in less restrictive ways.

Veterans organizations and politicians reacted negatively. Several months after the decision, both chambers of Congress passed new versions of the Stolen Valor Act of 2005 based on the suggestions in the Court's opinion. Despite the Supreme Court having struck down the conviction under the Act, Alvarez remained in prison for fraud on other matters.

== Background ==
=== Stolen Valor Act of 2005 ===
The Stolen Valor Act of 2005 was developed as a response to a rapid rise in people falsely claiming to be decorated military veterans amid the Iraq and Afghanistan wars. In Congressional findings supporting the act, leaders contemplated both tangible and intangible harms in lying about military service, especially in the case of people claiming to receive high military decorations and medals such as the Medal of Honor, Distinguished Service Cross, Silver Star Medal and Purple Heart, all of which signify honorable service on the battlefield. Tangible harms included veterans' benefits, consulting contracts, and tax benefits. Virginia, for instance, offered tax benefits to Medal of Honor recipients, and 600 people falsely claimed to be Medal of Honor recipients in that state in 2003. Congress also contemplated the view of Medal of Honor recipients who felt false claimants denigrated their own awards.

President George W. Bush signed the Stolen Valor Act of 2005 (18 U.S.C. § 704) into law on December 20, 2006. The act broadened previous provisions addressing the unauthorized wear, manufacture, or sale of any military decorations and medals by making it a misdemeanor to falsely represent oneself as having received any US military decoration or medal. If convicted, defendants could have been imprisoned for up to six months or up to one year if the lie was about the Medal of Honor. Proponents in Congress argued that the law was passed to prevent imposters from "stealing the valor" of soldiers returning from engagements in Iraq and Afghanistan.

=== Alvarez's statements ===
In 2007, Xavier Alvarez was narrowly elected to a seat on the board of the Three Valley Water District in Claremont, California. When he attended his first meeting of the board on July 23, he introduced himself by saying, "I'm a retired Marine of 25 years. I retired in the year 2001. Back in 1987, I was awarded the Congressional Medal of Honor. I got wounded many times by the same guy. I'm still around."

A few weeks prior, Alvarez had also claimed to be a Medal of Honor winner during a tour of a power plant, arousing the suspicion of a plant employee, Melissa Campbell, herself a Marine veteran of 10 years. During this tour, he further claimed to have won the Silver Star, which is also covered by the act. Campbell subsequently reported Alvarez to the Federal Bureau of Investigation, which obtained a recording of Alvarez's statements.

Within several days, local media began reporting that Alvarez lied a number of times during the election. He falsely claimed on the ballot form to be a professional engineer, and claimed to have earned an engineering degree from California State Polytechnic University. He also claimed to have rescued an American ambassador during the Iran hostage crisis, to be married to a Mexican movie star, and to have played hockey for the Detroit Red Wings. Investigators later ascertained the lies were Alvarez's way to get ahead "after years of falling short politically."

=== Lower court decisions ===
The FBI charged Alvarez in the U.S. District Court for the Central District of California with two counts of violating the Stolen Valor Act. He was the first person charged under the law. His legal counsel argued that the Stolen Valor Act was unconstitutional under the First Amendment to the U.S. Constitution, an argument that judge R. Gary Klausner rejected. Alvarez pleaded guilty to violating the Stolen Valor Act. He was sentenced to three years of probation and 416 hours of community service. He was also ordered to pay $5,100 in fines and assessments.

Alvarez appealed to the U.S. Court of Appeals for the Ninth Circuit, where judges Thomas G. Nelson, Jay S. Bybee, and Milan Smith heard oral arguments November 4, 2009 in Pasadena, California, with Assistant U.S. Attorney Craig H. Missakian arguing for the United States, and Jonathan D. Libby, a deputy federal public defender in Los Angeles, representing Alvarez. The three-judge panel issued a split decision overturning the ruling of the district court. Smith, joined by Nelson, determined the Stolen Valor Act was unconstitutional, based on the strict scrutiny standard, and wrote that the government's argument against Alvarez amounted to an exception of the First Amendment. "Placing the presumption in favor of regulation, as the government and dissent’s proposed rule does, would steadily undermine the foundations of the First Amendment." Bybee, in a dissenting opinion, rejected the strict scrutiny standard and said the act was facially constitutional, after determining it was not overbroad.

The government appealed the Ninth Circuit's decision, which was subsequently granted by the Supreme Court in 2011.

== Supreme Court oral arguments ==
The Supreme Court heard oral argument on February 22, 2012. Donald Verrilli, Jr., Solicitor General of the United States, appeared on behalf of the United States. Libby again appeared representing Alvarez.

Verrilli spoke first; he began by explaining that military honors touch on the core values of the armed forces, and the Stolen Valor Act simply aims to protect those core values. Almost immediately Justice Sonia Sotomayor asked Verrilli a hypothetical:

During the Vietnam War, a protester holds up a sign that says, "I won a Purple Heart – for killing babies." Knowing statement. He didn't win the Purple Heart. As a reader, I can't be sure whether he did and is a combat veteran who opposes the war, or whether he's a citizen protesting the war. Is that person, if he's not a veteran, having received the medal, is he liable under this act?

Verrilli responded by suggesting that such an act would be covered by the Act only if it were "reasonably understood by the audience as a statement of fact or as an exercise in political theater."

The questions during Verrilli's argument focused on the lack of injury caused by false claims of military honors. In nearly all the cases that the United States cited to support the proposition that there is no First Amendment value in falsity, the Court had addressed a false statement that harmed another, such as a defamatory statement. Relying on these cases, Verrilli stated, "[T]his Court has said in numerous contexts, numerous contexts, that the calculated factual falsehood has no First Amendment value for its own sake." Justice Anthony Kennedy immediately retorted:

Well, I'm – I'm not sure that that's quite correct. It has said it often, but always in context where it is well understood that speech can injure.... You think there's no value to falsity. But I – I simply can't find that in our cases, and I – I think it's a sweeping proposition to say that there's no value to falsity. Falsity is a way in which we contrast what is false and what is true.

Libby opened the defense argument by emphasizing that the First Amendment is intended to protect personal autonomy. In response to several questions, Libby played on the Court's discontent with the apparent lack of harm by stating that there is value in falsity "so long as it doesn't cause imminent harm to another person or imminent harm to a government function."

Libby stumbled in the Court's estimation, however, when he conceded that the Act did not chill any truthful speech. In response, Justice Kagan stated, "So, boy, I mean, that's a big concession, Mr. Libby. Then you're saying, you can only win this case if this Court decides that the Gertz statement was a kind of overstatement, an exaggeration, puffery."

== Supreme Court's decision ==
On June 28, 2012, a divided Court held that the prohibition against making false statements of having been awarded a military medal under the Stolen Valor Act of 2005 violated the First Amendment. However, the six justices in the majority could not agree on a single rationale for the decision. Since the Stolen Valor Act of 2005 did not contain a provision of severability, the Supreme Court was ultimately free to overturn the Act in its entirety.

=== Kennedy's plurality opinion ===
Justice Anthony Kennedy, writing for a plurality consisting of himself, Chief Justice John Roberts, Justice Ruth Bader Ginsburg, and Justice Sonia Sotomayor, wrote that false statements are not, by the sole reason of their falsity, excluded from First Amendment protection. "The Court has never endorsed the categorical rule the Government advances," Kennedy wrote. "Our prior decisions have not confronted a measure, like the Stolen Valor Act [of 2005], that targets falsity and nothing more." Even though there are several examples of the use of penalizing false speech (like perjury), Kennedy argued that "[t]he Government has not demonstrated that false statements generally should constitute a new category of unprotected speech..."

The plurality opinion also expressed the wide applicability of the Stolen Valor Act of 2005. "The Act by its plain terms," Kennedy wrote, "applies to a false statement made at any time, in any place, to any person". Such breadth means that the law is "sweeping... [the] reach of the statute puts it in conflict with the First Amendment... the statute would apply with equal force to personal, whispered conversations within a home."

When balanced against the Government's need to protect the value of the medal, the plurality said that "the link between the Government's interest in protecting the integrity of the military honors system and the Act's restriction on the false claims of liars like respondent has not been shown." Additionally, Kennedy wrote that 'counter-speech' was a sufficient solution to the problem: "It is a fair assumption that any true holders of the Medal who had heard of Alvarez's false claims would have been fully vindicated by the community's expression of outrage... Truth needs neither handcuffs nor a badge for its vindication."

Wrote Kennedy: "Permitting the government to decree this speech to be a criminal offense, whether shouted from the rooftops or made in a barely audible whisper, would endorse government authority to compile a list of subjects about which false statements are punishable. That governmental power has no clear limiting principle. Our constitutional tradition stands against the idea that we need Oceania’s Ministry of Truth," invoking George Orwell's novel Nineteen Eighty-Four.

=== Breyer's concurrence ===
Justice Stephen Breyer, joined by Justice Elena Kagan, agreed that the Stolen Valor Act of 2005 was unconstitutional, but on entirely different grounds. Breyer based his finding not on a strict scrutiny test that the plurality had used, but on a "proportionality" or "intermediate scrutiny test". This test examines "whether the statute works speech-related harm that is out of proportion to its justifications." After holding that Congress could create a database of those who had received the medal, among other alternatives to the existing law, Breyer said that there were lesser restrictive means to achieve the government's interest.

=== Alito's dissent ===
Justice Samuel Alito, joined by Justices Antonin Scalia and Clarence Thomas, dissented from the Court's decision striking down the Act. For Alito, the ruling had "[broken] sharply from a long line of cases recognizing that the right to free speech does not protect false factual statements that inflict real harm and serve no legitimate interest." "The Stolen Valor Act [of 2005]," Alito wrote, "represents the judgment of the people's elected representatives that false statements about military awards are very different from false statements about civilian awards... [the Act] is a narrow law enacted to address an important problem, and it presents no threat to freedom of expression."

== Reactions ==
The decision received praise on constitutional grounds from across the political spectrum. The First Amendment Center called the decision "a victory for free speech and common sense." Alvarez's attorney praised the decision, saying "The First Amendment protects a lot of what we as Americans get to say...The government doesn't get to decide what we can and cannot say.”

Several veterans organizations leaders were dismayed by the decision. A spokesperson for the Veterans of Foreign Wars said "Despite the ruling, the VFW will continue to challenge far-fetched stories, and to publicize these false heroes to the broadest extent possible as a deterrent to others.” Harold A. Fritz, a recipient of the medal from the Vietnam War, agreed with the VFW that "It’s more than just a piece of metal suspended on a piece of cloth on a pin. . . . And people who abuse that . . . need to be penalized." Proponents of the Stolen Valor Act promised to bring forward more limited legislation in the future.

The American Legion expressed hope that a narrower law would survive constitutional scrutiny. "We felt good about portions of the decision which suggest that a more narrowly tailored bill which incorporates traditional fraud elements would be upheld," said Fang Wong, national commander of the American Legion.

== Legacy ==
The legality of laws banning impersonating law enforcement officers came under question after the case. However, the majority of the court and legal scholars agreed that those laws are still constitutional under the First Amendment, because they serve a different purpose. Impersonating a law enforcement officer presents a threat to the public, which justifies speech restriction.

Alvarez remained in legal trouble due to allegations that he defrauded the government by falsely receiving health insurance benefits. He was convicted of misappropriation of public funds, grand theft, and insurance fraud in 2009 and sentenced to five years in state prison, and was discharged in March 2012 from Calipatria State Prison.

=== Revised law ===
In 2012, an effort was initiated to revise the Stolen Valor Act of 2005 to comply with the decision from the Supreme Court. The result was the Stolen Valor Act of 2013. This revised version of the law was passed by Congress and it was eventually signed by President Barack Obama. In addition to a wrongful claim of receiving one of the listed military awards, intent to gain some benefit or something of value by fraud was required.

== See also ==
- List of United States Supreme Court cases involving the First Amendment
