= Don Shipley (Navy SEAL) =

Retired U.S. Navy SEAL

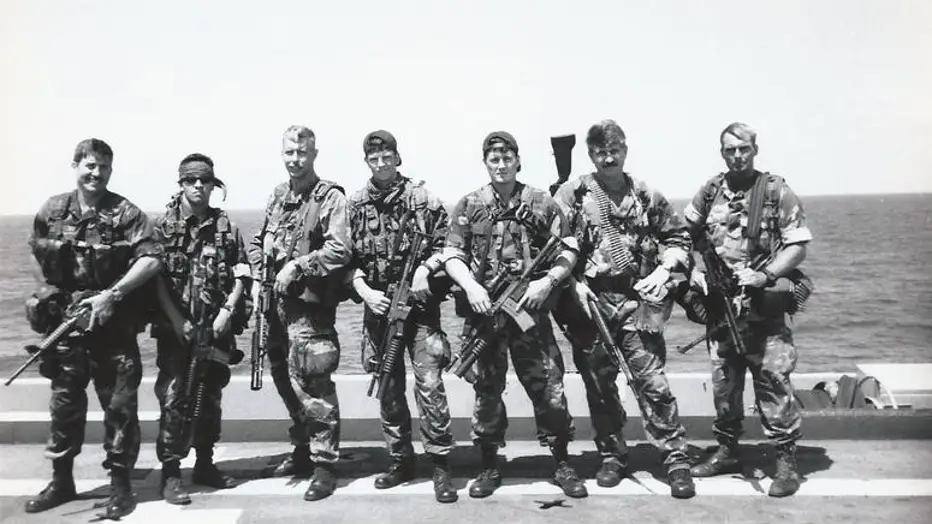
- Don Shipley with SEALs (2nd to the right)
- Born: Donald Wayne Shipley; 1960 or 1961 (age 65–66); Pittsburgh, Pennsylvania, U.S.
- Spouse: Diane Shipley (m. 1980)
- Children: 2 (DJ Shipley - SEAL) and 5 grandchildren
- Military career
- Allegiance: United States of America
- Branch: United States Navy
- Service years: 1978–2003
- Rank: Senior Chief Petty Officer (E-8)
- Nickname: Don
- Unit: SEALs
- Commands: Team 1 & Team 2
- Awards: Navy and Marine Corps Medal
- Website: Extreme Seal Experience

Donald Wayne Shipley is a retired United States Navy SEAL, who has gained recognition for his activism investigating and publicizing individuals who have made false claims of military service.

== Military service ==
Don Shipley joined the United States Navy in 1978 and became a Navy SEAL in 1984 after graduating from Basic Underwater Demolition/SEAL training BUD/S class 131. Following SEAL Basic Indoctrination (now known as SEAL Qualification Training or SQT) and completion of a six-month probationary period, he received the NEC 5326 as a Combatant Swimmer (SEAL) and was then entitled to wear the Special Warfare Insignia.

Shipley served in SEAL Team One, SEAL Team Two, the Naval Special Warfare Center, Basic Underwater Demolition/SEAL (BUD/S), and Naval Special Warfare Group Two (NSWG-2), NAB Little Creek, Virginia as a SEAL Advanced Training Instructor.

While serving with SEAL Team Two, Shipley conducted operations in Bosnia and Liberia. He became the first non-corpsman SEAL to graduate from paramedic school. He served in eight SEAL platoons, was platoon chief in five, and awarded the Navy and Marine Corps Medal for heroism during a search and rescue mission. When not in a SEAL platoon or deployed overseas, his time was spent running blocks of training for SEALs in air operations, land warfare, and demolitions. After 24 years of Navy service, he retired as a senior chief petty officer in 2003.

== Post-military life ==
After retirement, Shipley worked as a Security Contractor for Blackwater Security Consulting, spending a year in Pakistan and Afghanistan. Shipley ran a training course with several former U.S. Navy SEALs called Extreme SEAL Experience which prepared individuals for Naval Special Warfare training.

== Activism ==
Shipley has garnered attention for his work investigating individuals who claim to have served as SEALs or other high-profile military service claims. He and his wife Diane produced a series of YouTube videos, "Phony Navy SEAL of the Week", which combined footage of Shipley telephoning individuals suspected of false claims and questioning them to determine if stolen valor had occurred and how far the individual would persist in a deceptive claim. The videos also included interactions between him and Diane and video clips that related to the topic at hand.

The YouTube series became a series of video segments which are privately hosted on his website Extreme SEAL Videos on a paid subscription basis. In addition to a featured show in which Don and Diane travel around the United States to engage individuals who may have stolen valor, there are other video segments, including Q&A sessions, a cooking show hosted by Diane, and footage from the Extreme SEAL Experience training course.

Shipley has also been a Special Guest Contributor at 'SOFREP.com'. The site provides news and analysis from former military and Special Operations veterans. He states, "...the FBI estimates that there are 300 SEAL Impostors for every living Navy SEAL. Verifying at least a dozen and often over 20 fraudulent SEAL claims each day, I put the number much, much higher than 300." He estimates there are roughly 17,600 who have completed Naval Special Warfare training since 1943, about 10,000 of these are alive, and 2,400 of them on active duty.

Shipley's YouTube channel was terminated on February 21, 2019. He alleged that it was in retaliation for challenging activist Nathan Phillips' claims of having been a Vietnam veteran and "recon ranger" when Phillips had only served in the Marine Corps Reserve as a refrigerator technician and anti-tank missile man. YouTube issued a statement saying the account was terminated because Shipley was sharing too much identifying information, such as home addresses and phone numbers, in violation of YouTube policies that could lead to harassment of others. Shipley said he had been suspended previously, sometimes for months at a time, for making similar posts on YouTube about individuals who had pretended to be Navy SEALs. In August 2019, Shipley returned to YouTube with a new channel featuring clips from his website, where he continues his investigative work.

== Other work ==
Shipley has also appeared in television programs, including Secrets of SEAL Team Six (2011), and a 2011 episode of Inside Edition.

== See also ==
- List of United States Navy SEALs
