= Stolen Valor Act of 2005 =

US law regarding military awards

- Long title: An Act to amend title 18, United States Code, to enhance protections relating to the reputation and meaning of the Medal of Honor and other military decorations and awards, and for other purposes.
- Enacted by: the 109th United States Congress
- Effective: December 20, 2006, to June 28, 2012

Citations
- Public law: Pub. L. 109–437 (text) (PDF)
- Statutes at Large: 120 Stat. 3266–3267

Legislative history
- Introduced in the Senate as S. 1998 by Kent Conrad (D-ND) on November 10, 2005; Committee consideration by Senate Judiciary, House Judiciary; Passed the Senate on September 7, 2006 (Unanimous consent); Passed the House on December 6, 2006 (Voice vote); Signed into law by President George W. Bush on December 20, 2006

United States Supreme Court cases
- Struck down by United States v. Alvarez in a 6–3 decision on June 28, 2012

The Stolen Valor Act of 2005, signed into law by President George W. Bush on December 20, 2006, was a U.S. law that broadened the provisions of previous U.S. law addressing the unauthorized wear, manufacture, or sale of any military decorations and medals. The law made it a federal misdemeanor to falsely represent oneself as having received any U.S. military decoration or medal. If convicted, defendants might have been imprisoned for up to six months, unless the decoration lied about is the Medal of Honor, in which case imprisonment could have been up to one year. In United States v. Alvarez (2012), the Supreme Court of the United States ruled that the Stolen Valor Act of 2005 was an unconstitutional abridgment of the freedom of speech under the First Amendment–striking down the law in a 6 to 3 decision.

== Description ==
The Act was first introduced in the U.S. House of Representatives on July 19, 2005, by Representative John Salazar, a Democrat from Colorado, as H.R. 3352. It was introduced in the Senate by Senator Kent Conrad, a Democrat from North Dakota, on November 10, 2005, as S. 1998. The Senate version was passed unanimously on September 7, 2006. The House passed the Senate version, S. 1998, on December 6, 2006.

The purpose of the Act was to strengthen the provisions of federal law (18 U.S.C. § 704) by broadening its scope and strengthening penalties. Specific new provisions in the Act included:

- granting more authority to federal law enforcement officers;
- broadening the law to cover false claims whereas previously an overt act had to be committed;
- covering the mailing and shipping of medals; and
- protecting the reputation and meaning of military heroism medals.

The Act made it illegal for unauthorized persons to wear, buy, sell, barter, trade, or manufacture "any decoration or medal authorized by Congress for the armed forces of the United States, or any of the service medals or badges awarded to the members of such forces." In the 18 months after the act was enacted, the Chicago Tribune estimated there were twenty prosecutions. The number increased as awareness of the law spread.

The Act was passed to address the issue of persons claiming to have been awarded military awards to which they were not entitled and exploiting their deception for personal gain. For example, as of June 2, 2006, there were only 120 living Medal of Honor recipients, but there were far more known imposters. There were also large numbers of people fraudulently claiming to be Navy SEALS and Army Special Forces, among others.

The Orders and Medals Society of America (OMSA), an organization of collectors, opposed the version of the bill that passed. OMSA was concerned about the changes to 18 USC that in its judgment implied that any movement or exchange of medals was illegal.

== Legal challenges ==
=== United States v. Strandlof ===
Rick Strandlof, founder of Colorado Veterans Alliance, was accused of seeking to raise funds for that organization by posing as Marine Captain "Rick Duncan" and claiming to have received a Silver Star and Purple Heart in the Iraq War. In January 2010, he challenged the constitutionality of the Stolen Valor Act in U.S. District Court in Denver, Colorado. Strandlof's attorney believed the law was too vague and that "protecting the reputation of military decorations is insufficient to survive [strict scrutiny]", a level of judicial review that requires the government to justify any limitation it places on free speech. The Rutherford Institute, a Virginia-based civil liberties group, joined in the case on January 20, 2010. "Such expression remains within the presumptive protection afforded pure speech by the First Amendment," the institute's attorney wrote. "As such, the Stolen Valor Act is an unconstitutional restraint on the freedom of speech."

On July 16, 2010, a federal judge in Denver ruled the Stolen Valor Act is "facially unconstitutional" because it violates free speech and dismissed the criminal case against Strandlof who lied about being an Iraq war veteran. Strandlof, 32, was charged with five misdemeanors related to violating the Act – specifically, making false claims about receiving military decorations.

U.S. District Judge Robert E. Blackburn issued his decision rejecting the prosecution's argument that lying about having military medals dilutes their meaning and significance. "This wholly unsubstantiated assertion is, frankly, shocking and, indeed, unintentionally insulting to the profound sacrifices of military personnel the Stolen Valor Act purports to honor," Blackburn wrote. "To suggest that the battlefield heroism of our servicemen and women is motivated in any way, let alone in a compelling way, by considerations of whether a medal may be awarded simply defies my comprehension." Attorney Chris Beall, who filed an amicus curiae brief on behalf of the ACLU of Colorado, said the decision is remarkable. "The First Amendment protects speech we don't like," he said. "We don't need the First Amendment for speech people like. The government cannot criminalize a statement simply because it is false, no matter how important the statement is." Beall points out Strandlof wasn't charged with stealing money meant for the veterans group, adding that laws are already in place for those crimes. "That's plain-old, regular-vanilla everyday fraud, and we do prosecute that every day," he said. "Congress does not need a special statute to prevent people from using false claims of valor in order to prevent fraud." John Wagner, executive director of the Warrior Legacy Foundation, a veterans group that lobbied for Strandlof's prosecution, said he will push for an appeal. A spokesman for the U.S. attorney in Denver said prosecutors are reviewing the decision and haven't decided whether to appeal. The spokesman said that decision would be made by the U.S. Justice Department in Washington and prosecutors in Denver.

On January 27, 2012, the U.S. Court of Appeals for the Tenth Circuit overruled the district court and reinstated the charges against Strandlof. Two judges on the three-judge panel held that false statements are not worthy of constitutional protection. In dissent, Judge Jerome Holmes wrote that the majority was reading language into the act to justify upholding it. On July 2, 2012, the Tenth Circuit vacated its previous opinion, writing, "In light of United States v. Alvarez, we vacate both the opinion and the judgment issued on January 27, 2012."

=== United States v. Alvarez ===
Initially the U.S. Court of Appeals for the Ninth Circuit decided Alvarez on August 17, 2010, ruling the Stolen Valor Act unconstitutional. Specifically, in the 2–1 decision, Judge Milan Smith stated for the court that lies not within traditionally unprotected subsets of false facts are subject to First Amendment protection, the Stolen Valor Act is not subject to defamation law precedent, and there is no compelling reason for government interest in banning such lies.

"The right to speak and write whatever one chooses – including, to some degree, worthless, offensive and demonstrable untruths – without cowering in fear of a powerful government is, in our view, an essential component of the protection afforded by the First Amendment," Judge Smith wrote. If lying about a medal can be classified as a crime, Smith said, so many everyday lies could become criminal acts, such as lying about one's age, misrepresenting one's financial status on Facebook, or telling one's mother falsehoods about drinking, smoking, or sex.

On March 21, 2011, a majority of judges in the U.S. Court of Appeals for the Ninth Circuit refused to rehear the Alvarez case en banc. In the order refusing to hear the case en banc, Judge Alex Kozinski issued a lengthy concurrence, responding to critics of the decision and asserting that the First Amendment covers most varieties of lying and misrepresentation, where not otherwise unprotected by the First Amendment under the traditional view. The traditional view holds that only certain varieties of speech are exempt from standard constitutional scrutiny such as fraud, fighting words, defamation, incitement (including to a “clear and present danger”), and speech attendant to the commission of a crime. Judge Diarmuid O'Scannlain dissented from the denial of rehearing arguing that false representations are not per se entitled to First Amendment protection.

On October 17, 2011, the U.S. Supreme Court agreed to consider the validity of the law. On June 28, 2012, the Supreme Court found the law unconstitutional in a 6 to 3 decision, with Justices Scalia, Thomas and Alito dissenting. In United States v. Alvarez the majority held that the Stolen Valor Act was an unconstitutional abridgment of the freedom of speech under the First Amendment.

== Legacy ==
Justice Anthony Kennedy's opinion in United States v. Alvarez cited that "a Government-created database" is "at least one less speech-restrictive means by which the Government could likely protect the integrity of the military award system." In his view, "were a database accessible through the Internet, it would be easy to verify and expose false claims." In response, President Obama announced the creation of the U.S. Military Awards for Valor in July 2012, saying "this week, we will launch a new website, a living memorial, so the American people can see who’s been awarded our nation’s highest honors . . . because no American hero should ever have their valor stolen.” The DoD valor database was unveiled on July 25, 2012. Additionally, in response Representative Joe Heck sponsored the Stolen Valor Act of 2012 to criminalize profiting by falsely claiming to have received a military medal for serving in combat, which passed with a vote of 410 to 3; a companion bill was sponsored by Senator Jim Webb, which passed as an amendment of the defense authorization bill. In the 113th Congress Representative Heck reintroduced the modified act, receiving 65 cosponsors.

The Stolen Valor Act of 2013 was signed by President Barack Obama on June 3, 2013. The Act makes it a federal crime to fraudulently claim to be a recipient of certain military decorations or medals in order to obtain money, property, or other tangible benefit.

== See also ==
- Stolen Valor Act of 2013, a subsequently-enacted U.S. law with more narrow provisions
- List of acts of the 109th United States Congress
- Military impostor
- Mitchell Paige, Medal of Honor recipient who later tracked imposters
- Stolen Valor, book by B. G. Burkett and Glenna Whitley chronicling phony Vietnam veterans.
- Don Shipley, retired Navy SEAL who exposes fraudulent claims of military service.
