= Stolen Valor =

Book by B. G. Burkett, a Vietnam veteran

- Author: B.G. Burkett and Glenna Whitley
- Cover artist: Mark McGarry
- Publisher: Verity Press
- Publication date: 1998
- Publication place: U.S.
- Media type: Hardcover; Paperback
- Pages: 692 pages
- ISBN: 1-56530-284-2
- OCLC: 39458833
- Dewey Decimal: 959.704/3373/0922 21
- LC Class: DS558 .B85 1998

Stolen Valor: How the Vietnam Generation Was Robbed of Its Heroes and Its History (1998) is a self-published book by B.G. Burkett, a Vietnam veteran, and Glenna Whitley, an investigative journalist. In the book, Burkett and Whitley argue that numerous people claiming to have been mentally injured by serving in the Vietnam War never served there, and they name individuals who they say were mistakenly given military awards. The book won the Colby Award for military writers in 2000.

== Contents ==
Stolen Valor is in 4 parts, with appendices.

Part I, "The Image", begins with a chapter about author B.G. Burkett's time in the U.S. Army. The next four chapters detail the author's argument that the image of the Vietnam veteran was tarnished by a combination of media coverage, veteran imposters, U.S. citizens' anger against the draft, and a perception of the veteran as a victim.

Part II, "The Trauma of War", looks into the diagnoses of post traumatic stress disorder (PTSD) among Vietnam veterans, and how it has been treated by the Veterans' Administration. It also explores accusations against Vietnam veterans of war atrocities. The authors explore the effects of Vietnam War veteran imposters on the image of the Vietnam veteran. They contend that the news media inadequately investigated some persons claiming to be veterans and attributing such problems as homelessness to the aftermath of the war.

Part III, "Stolen Valor", describes individuals wearing Vietnam War medals, ribbons and badges although they had not earned them. Using the Freedom of Information Act, the authors retrieved records of people who claimed they served in Vietnam and received awards. The book denounces those whose records do not match their claims; examples include William Northrop and Frank Dux. The authors also attempt to counter claims that African-American soldiers were overly represented among the war's casualties.

Part IV, "Victims and Heroes", the authors discuss what they characterize as myths about the effects of Agent Orange. They profile individual pilots who flew Agent Orange delivery missions in Vietnam without negative health effects. The authors criticize Vietnam Veterans of America, referring to them as "Vietnam Victims of America."

The appendices provide lists of recipients of the Medal of Honor, the Distinguished Service Cross, the Navy Cross, the Air Force Cross, and of U.S. military prisoners of war who survived their captivity.

== Reception ==
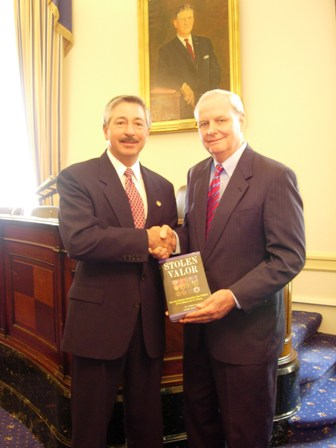
Burkett pictured with Congressman John Salazar and Stolen Valor

U.S. Senator Jim Webb praised Stolen Valor, calling it "one [of] the most courageous books of the decade". The book received the Colby Award for military writers in 2000.

It is believed to have contributed to Congressional passage of the Stolen Valor Act of 2005, which made it a crime for an individual to falsely claim to have been awarded military medals.

In 1999, Mackubin Thomas Owens, a Marine infantry veteran of Vietnam, praised the book and Burkett, saying, concluding, "Mr. Burkett has done an immense service to his fellow veterans, and by extension to his country".

In 2004, Dave Curry from Vietnam Veterans Against the War (VVAW) responded to the criticism of VVAW in the book. In a scathing review, he said the book displayed political partisanship, made "errors in research methodology" and misleading statements about Winter Soldier Investigation participants, and denigrated the experiences and motives of veterans who subsequently opposed the war.

In 2008, psychiatrist Paul R. McHugh listed Stolen Valor as one of the five best books on "the factions and follies of psychiatry." He cited Burkett's efforts to uncover fraudulent PTSD claims.

A 2009 article in Columbia Journalism Review discussed how Stolen Valor exposed the media's gullibility in failing to fact-check people who claimed military service and awards. It concluded that "no reporter who reads it will ever again crank out a Veterans Day feature without making an effort to verify the subject’s claims first".
