= Rod Nachman =

American lawyer

Merton Roland "Rod" Nachman Jr. (1923–2015) was a lawyer best known for representing the unsuccessful plaintiff in the landmark 1964 United States Supreme Court case New York Times Co. v. Sullivan. He also appeared before the Supreme Court of the United States in 1951 at the age of 27.

== Early life ==
Nachman was born in Montgomery on December 21, 1923. His German Jewish family ran a department store in Montgomery, Alabama named Nachman and Mertief. He graduated from Montgomery's Sidney Lanier High School, and attended Harvard University for two years, when he broke off to enlist in the United States Navy during World War II. After a 3-year stint in the military, including as an intelligence officer in Hawaii, he returned to Harvard, graduating from Harvard Law School in 1948.

== Career ==
After graduating from Harvard Law School, Nachman worked as an assistant attorney general in Montgomery, Alabama, where he lived with his wife, Louise. In 1951, he appeared before the United States Supreme Count in the railroad rate discrimination case Alabama Public Service Commission v. Southern Railway Co., representing the Alabama Public Service Commission. The Supreme Court had minimum practice requirements for attorneys who appeared before it that Nachman did not meet, but he was nevertheless permitted to represent the Commission pro hac vice, to the annoyance of Justice Felix Frankfurter. Nevertheless, his client won.

Nachman left government service in 1954 for a private law practice in partnership with another attorney, Walter Knabe. In 1956, he worked as an assistant to Alabama Senator John Sparkman in Washington, D.C., returning again to Montgomery in 1959 to work at the law firm of Steiner, Crum, and Baker, which was considered one of the most prestigious firms in the city.

Nachman won a notable libel suit in 1956 on behalf of plaintiffs Montgomery city commissioners William A. Gayle, Clyde Sellers, and Frank Parks. Ken For Men magazine had published a story headlined "Kimono Girls Check in Again", supposedly about corruption and gambling in the city, but Nachman showed that the writer had entirely fabricated the story, never actually having visited Montgomery, and that the magazine had published it anyway despite knowing that fact. The commissioners settled out of court for $15,000 (equivalent to $178,000 in 2025).

Nachman won another libel suit in 1957 on behalf of plaintiff Edward Davis, who had been reported on for being charged (later acquitted) for assaulting civil rights activist and Baptist minister Ralph Abernathy, but had also been incorrectly identified by Jet magazine as the same Davis as a teacher who had been fired for making sexual advances on his students. Davis was awarded $67,500 (equivalent to $774,000 in 2025) (later reduced to $45,000 (equivalent to $533,000 in 2025) on appeal) by a jury. As a result of these victories, Nachman developed a reputation as a strong libel lawyer in both the city and state by 1960.

In 1964, Nachman represented plaintiff and Montgomery Public Safety Commissioner L. B. Sullivan in the Supreme Court case New York Times Co. v. Sullivan. Nachman argued that the First Amendment to the United States Constitution did not require that, in suing for defamation, a public official show anything beyond the normal elements of defamation. The Supreme Court decided against Sullivan in a landmark decision, holding that public officials must show actual malice as well as the normal elements of defamation. Nachman was unhappy about being known for this decision and later in life often expressed the sentiment that he "would rather be famous for a case he won rather than one he lost." He also argued in 2008 that Sullivan and its progeny had "discouraged good people from running for office" and claimed that "the courts may have gone a little bit far for the First Amendment."

Before and after Sullivan, Nachman also worked as general counsel for the Montgomery Advertiser newspaper. After Nachman's death, Advertiser journalist Coke Ellington recalled Nachman often saying that "the greatest thing I ever did for the Advertiser was to lose [Sullivan]." Nachman was a president of the Alabama State Bar Association from 1973–74 and a friend of judge Frank Minis Johnson. He was a director of the American Judicature Society; a member of the American Bar Association Board of Governors (where he was particularly active), of the American College of Trial Lawyers, the American Academy of Appellate Lawyers, and the American Law Institute; and a chairman of the Alabama Supreme Court Advisory Committee.

Nachman was also the court-appointed chairman of the Alabama prison system's Human Rights Committee, established in 1983 by Judge Johnson. Nachman advised the selection of his fellow committee members and of the committee's consultant.

In 1977, Nachman was on the shortlist of candidates for a vacancy in the Fifth Circuit Court of Appeals alongside fellow Montgomery lawyer Truman McGill Hobbs, Huntsville lawyer Pat Richardson, and Robert Smith Vance. President Jimmy Carter nominated Vance, who was confirmed.

== Death ==
Nachman died in Montgomery on November 24, 2015, survived by four daughters.

== Bibliography ==
- Nachman, M. Roland (October 1972). "Alabama's Breakthrough for Reform". Judicature. 56. OCLC 4769294442.

— Nachman gives an account of the attempts to reform the Alabama judicial system from 1966 to 1971 that included a failed constitutional amendment and resulted in greater powers to reassign judges and a department of court management.
