= Abortion in Minnesota =

Abortion in Minnesota is legal at all stages of pregnancy and is restricted only to standards of good medical practice. The Minnesota Supreme Court ruled the Minnesota Constitution conferred a right to an abortion in 1995 and the DFL-led Minnesota Legislature passed and Minnesota Governor Tim Walz signed into law a bill in 2023 to recognize a right to reproductive freedom and preventing local units of government from limiting that right. The Center for Reproductive Rights labels Minnesota as one of the most abortion-protective states in the country.

About 10,000 abortions occur each year in the state.

In a 2014 Pew Research Center survey, 52% of Minnesota adults said that abortion should be legal in all or most cases, while 45% said that abortion should be illegal in all or most cases. The 2023 American Values Atlas reported that, in their most recent survey, 67% of Minnesotans said that abortion should be legal in all or most cases.

== Background ==
Abortion was a criminal offense for women by 1950. By 2007, the state had informed consent laws on the book. The state legislature passed abortion restrictions in 2011, 2012 and 2018 that were ultimately all vetoed by DFL governor Mark Dayton.

The number of abortion clinics have been declining in recent years, going from twenty in 1982 to fourteen in 1992 to six in 2014. There were 10,123 legal abortions performed in 2014, and 9,861 in 2015. As of 2022, 77% of abortions were before 9 weeks and 98% were before 20 weeks. Abortion was criminally prosecuted between 1911 and 1930, resulting in 30 convictions against women in that period.

By 2019, Minnesota was one of only two states in the nation (along with Alabama) that did not have a law that terminated parental rights of men who produced a child via rape or incest.

== History ==
=== Legislative history ===
In the 1950s, the state legislature passed a law stating that a woman who had an abortion or actively sought one (regardless of whether she went through with it) was guilty of a criminal offense. Parental consent laws passed by Massachusetts and Minnesota in the 1980s created over 12,000 petitions to bypass consent. Of these, 21 were denied and half of these denials were overturned on appeal.

The state was one of 23 states in 2007 to have a detailed abortion-specific informed consent requirement. Arkansas, Minnesota and Oklahoma all require that women seeking abortions after 20-weeks be verbally informed that the fetus may feel pain during the abortion procedure despite a Journal of the American Medical Association conclusion that pain sensors do not develop in the fetus until between weeks 23 and 30. The state legislature was one of four states nationwide that tried, and failed, to pass an early abortion ban in 2012 (often called a "fetal heartbeat bill" by proponents). It was also introduced in 2019 by Representative Tim Miller.

In 2018, the state was one of eleven where the legislature introduced a bill that would have banned abortion in almost all cases. It did not pass. The state legislature was one of ten states nationwide that tried to unsuccessfully pass a "heartbeat bill" in 2018. Only Iowa successfully passed such a bill, but it was struck down by the courts. As of May 14, 2019, the state prohibited abortions after the fetus was viable, generally some point between weeks 24 and 28 in gestation. This period was defined by the US Supreme Court in their landmark 1973 case Roe v. Wade.

==== Protect Reproductive Options Act ====
In January 2023, the Minnesota Legislature passed the Protecting Reproductive Options Act to "explicitly protect and codify abortion rights" within Minnesota law. Tim Walz, the Governor of Minnesota, signed the bill into law on January 31, 2023.

=== Judicial history ===
In a 1894 case on abortion, the Minnesota Supreme Court said, "As a first impression, it may seem to be an unsound rule that one who solicits the commission of an offense, and willingly submits to its being committed upon her own person, should not be deemed an accomplice, while those whom she has thus solicited should be deemed principal criminals in the transaction. But in cases of this kind the public welfare demands the application of this rule, and its exceptions from the general rule seems to be justified by the wisdom of experience. The wife, then, in this case, was not, within the rules of the law, an accomplice. She was the victim of the cruel act which resulted in her death. Misguided by her own desires, and mistaken in her belief, she, by the advice of the defendant, submitted to his treatment, willing, it may be; but the desire of one, and the criminal act of the other, resulted in the death of one, and the imprisonment of the other."

==== Roe v. Wade ====
The US Supreme Court's decision in 1973's Roe v. Wade ruling meant the state could no longer regulate abortion in the first trimester. However, the Supreme Court overturned Roe v. Wade in Dobbs v. Jackson Women's Health Organization, No. 19-1392, 597 U.S. ___ (2022) later in 2022.

==== Hodgson v. Minnesota ====
The 1990 US Supreme Court case Hodgson v. Minnesota said that parental consent can cause danger for minors seeking abortions if physical, emotional or sexual abuse is already present. The case concerned a Minnesota law that required notifying both parents of a minor before she could undergo an abortion; it also contained a judicial bypass provision designed to take effect only if a court found it necessary. Dr. Jane Hodgson, a Minneapolis gynecologist, challenged the law. The Eighth Circuit had ruled that the law would have been unconstitutional without a judicial bypass option. While Justice Stevens delivered a majority opinion for one of the holdings, there were five votes for each of two holdings, with Justice O'Connor proving as the decisive vote for each. Justices Stevens, Brennan, Marshall, Blackmun and O'Connor formed a majority holding that the two-parent notice requirement by itself was unconstitutional. Justice O'Connor believed that the two-parent requirement entailed risk to a pregnant teenager; she also argued that the rule failed to meet even the lowest standard of judicial review, a rationality standard. She joined the Court's more conservative Justices (Chief Justice Rehnquist and Justices White, Scalia and Kennedy), to form a majority for the law being valid with the judicial bypass; Justice Kennedy had pointed out the usefulness of the bypass procedure, as judges granted all but a handful of requests to authorize abortions without parental notice.

==== Doe v. Gomez ====
In 1995, the Minnesota Supreme Court ruled in Doe v. Gomez that the Minnesota Constitution conferred a right to an abortion and public funding for an abortion. A 2022 ruling by a state district court in Doe v. Minnesota decided that certain regulations on abortion were also unconstitutional.

=== Clinic history ===
Number of abortion clinics in Minnesota by year

Between 1982 and 1992, the number of abortion clinics in the state decreased by six, going from twenty in 1982 to fourteen in 1992. In 2014, there were six abortion clinics in the state. In 2014, 95% of the counties in the state did not have an abortion clinic. That year, 59% of women in the state aged 15–44 lived in a county without an abortion clinic. In March 2016, there were 18 Planned Parenthood clinics in the state. In 2017, there were still 18 Planned Parenthood clinics, of which only 1 offered abortion services, in a state with a population of 1,227,431 women aged 15–49. In 2025, Planned Parenthood North Central States announced it would close four clinics in Minnesota and four in Iowa due to federal funding cuts.

== Statistics ==
In the period between 1972 and 1974, there were no recorded illegal abortion-related death in the state. In 1990, 529,000 women in the state faced the risk of an unintended pregnancy. In 2013, among white women aged 15–19, there were 510 abortions, 260 abortions for black women aged 15–19, 80 abortions for Hispanic women aged 15–19, and 140 abortions for women of all other races.

In 2014, 52% of adults said in a poll conducted by the Pew Research Center that abortion should be legal in all or most cases. 45% said they opposed abortion in all or most cases. The New York Times estimated that in 2022, 54% of Minnesotan's thought abortion should be "mostly legal", while 40% thought it should be "mostly illegal".

Number of reported abortions, abortion rate and percentage change in rate by geographic region and state in 1992, 1995 and 1996
Census division and state	Number			Rate			% change 1992–1996
Census division and state	1992	1995	1996	1992	1995	1996	% change 1992–1996
West North Central	57,340	48,530	48,660	14.3	11.9	11.9	–16
Iowa	6,970	6,040	5,780	11.4	9.8	9.4	–17
Kansas	12,570	10,310	10,630	22.4	18.3	18.9	–16
Minnesota	16,180	14,910	14,660	15.6	14.2	13.9	–11
Missouri	13,510	10,540	10,810	11.6	8.9	9.1	–21
Nebraska	5,580	4,360	4,460	15.7	12.1	12.3	–22
North Dakota	1,490	1,330	1,290	10.7	9.6	9.4	–13
South Dakota	1,040	1,040	1,030	6.8	6.6	6.5	–4

Number, rate, and ratio of reported abortions, by reporting area of residence and occurrence and by percentage of abortions obtained by out-of-state residents, US CDC estimates
Location	Residence			Occurrence			% obtained by out-of-state residents	Year	Ref
Location	No.	Rate^	Ratio^^	No.	Rate^	Ratio^^	% obtained by out-of-state residents	Year	Ref
Minnesota					15.6			1992	
Minnesota				14,910	14.2			1995	
Minnesota				14,660	13.9			1996	
Minnesota	9,533	9.1	136	10,123	9.6	145	9.3	2014	
Minnesota	9,234	8.8	132	9,861	9.4	141	9.8	2015	
Minnesota	9,425	8.9	135	10,017	9.5	144	9.0	2016	
^number of abortions per 1,000 women aged 15–44; ^^number of abortions per 1.000 live births

== Criminal prosecutions of abortion ==
Between 1911 and 1930, there were 100 indictments and 30 convictions for women having abortions. Dr. Jane Hodgson was convicted in 1970 of performing an illegal abortion on a 23-year-old woman in Minnesota. Hodgson was an abortion rights activist.

== Abortion financing ==
Minnesota is one of seventeen states that uses state funds to cover all or most medically necessary abortions sought by low-income women under Medicaid. Minnesota is one of thirteen other states that are required by State court orders to do so. In 2010, the state had 3,941 publicly funded abortions, of which sixteen were federally funded and 3,925 were state funded.

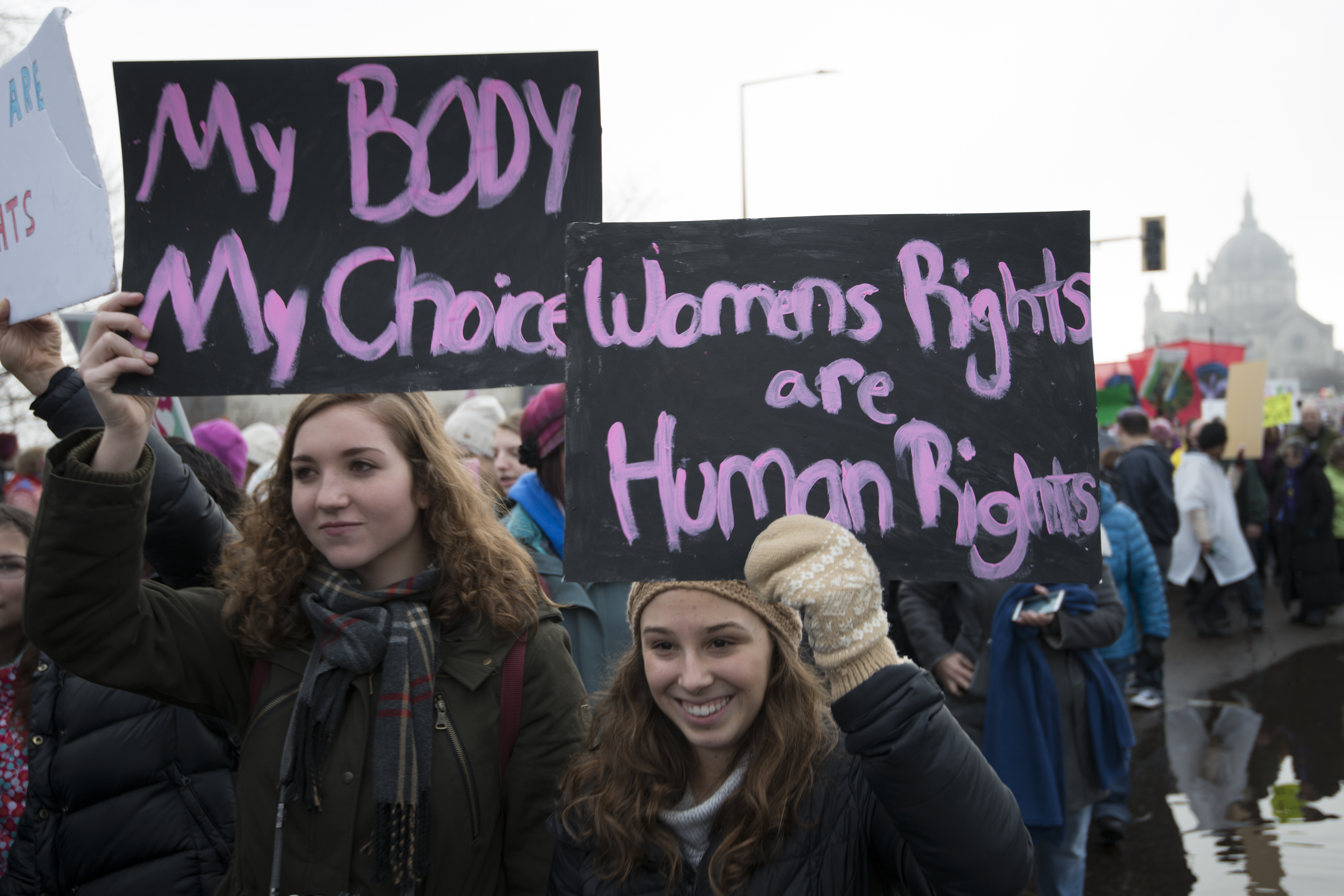
St. Paul, Minnesota, January 21, 2017. Over 30,000 people gathered in St. Paul and marched to the Minnesota capitol to protest President Donald Trump.

== Abortion rights views and activities ==
Today, the state has an active abortion rights community, including the organization UnRestrict MN and Pro-Choice Minnesota, involved in activities such as facilitating travel for women seeking abortions and advocating in support of abortion rights.

=== Protests ===
Following the overturn of Roe v. Wade on June 24, 2022, abortion rights protests were held in Minneapolis and Saint Paul. An abortion rights protest was also held in St. Cloud at the Stearns County Courthouse.

== Anti-abortion views and activities ==
=== Organizations ===
Minnesota Family Council (MFC) is a Christian organization that, among other issues, opposes abortion and abortion-related education in public schools, stating that: "human life is sacred from conception to natural death and must be protected by government".

=== Violence ===
In 1977, there was an arson attack on a Minnesota abortion clinic. An act of violence took place at an abortion clinic in Crow Wing County, Minnesota.

On January 22, 2009, Matthew L. Derosia, 32, who was reported to have had a history of mental illness, rammed an SUV into the front entrance of a Planned Parenthood clinic in Saint Paul, Minnesota, causing between $2,500 and $5,000 in damage. Derosia, who told police that Jesus told him to "stop the murderers", was ruled competent to stand trial. He pleaded guilty in March 2009 to one count of criminal damage to property.

On June 14, 2025, Minnesota state representative Melissa Hortman and her husband were assassinated in their home in Brooklyn Park, Minnesota by a man impersonating a police officer. The same man had earlier shot Minnesota state senator John Hoffman (Minnesota politician) and his wife, who survived. The suspect, 57-year old Vance Luther Boelter, was an evangelical Christian businessman who was a member of the anti-abortion movement. Police found writings in the suspect's car that included a list of nearly 70 names, mostly Democrat politicians or figures with ties to groups that either advocate for abortion rights or provide abortion services. Boelter pled guilty to the killings to avoid the death penalty and instead receive two consecutive life sentences.
