= United States defamation law =

Limitation on freedom of speech in the US

The origins of the United States' defamation laws pre-date the American Revolution; one influential case in 1734 involved John Peter Zenger and established precedent that "The Truth" is an absolute defense against charges of libel. Though the First Amendment of the U.S. Constitution was designed to protect freedom of the press, for most of the history of the United States, the U.S. Supreme Court failed to use it to rule on libel cases. This left libel laws, based upon the traditional "Common Law" of defamation inherited from the English legal system, mixed across the states. The 1964 case New York Times Co. v. Sullivan, however, radically changed the nature of libel law in the United States by establishing that public officials could win a suit for libel only when they could prove the media outlet in question knew either that the information was wholly and patently false or that it was published "with reckless disregard of whether it was false or not". Later Supreme Court cases barred strict liability for libel and forbade libel claims for statements that are so ridiculous as to be obviously facetious. Recent cases have added precedent on defamation law and the Internet.

The First Amendment's guarantees of freedom of speech and freedom of the press provide defendants in the United States a measure of protection from defamation lawsuits. Some variation exists among the several states as to the extent to which the states' legislatures have passed statutes or their courts have handed down decisions affecting the contours inherited from common law. Some states codify what constitutes slander and libel together into the same set of laws.

Criminal libel is rarely prosecuted but exists on the books in many states, and is constitutionally permitted in circumstances essentially identical to those where civil libel liability is constitutional. Defenses to libel that can result in dismissal before trial include the statement being one of opinion rather than fact or being "fair comment and criticism", though neither of these are imperatives on the US constitution. Truth is an absolute defense against defamation in the United States, meaning true statements cannot be defamatory.

Most states recognize that some categories of false statements are considered to be defamatory per se, such that people making a defamation claim for these statements do not need to prove that the statement caused them actual damages. (See section Defamation per se.)

== Development ==
Laws regulating slander and libel in the United States began to develop even before the American Revolution.

=== John Peter Zenger ===
In one of the most famous cases, New York City publisher John Peter Zenger was imprisoned for eight months in 1734 for printing attacks on the governor of the colony. Zenger won his case and was acquitted by jury in 1735 under the counsel of Andrew Hamilton.

Gouverneur Morris, a major contributor in the framing of the U.S. Constitution said, "The trial of Zenger in 1735 was the germ of American freedom, the morning star of that liberty which subsequently revolutionized America".

Zenger's case also established that libel cases, though they were civil rather than criminal cases, could be heard by a jury, which would have the authority to rule on the allegations and to set the amount of monetary damages awarded.

=== People v. Croswell ===
The Zenger case did not, however, establish a precedent. In 1804 Harry Croswell lost a libel suit in People v. Croswell when the Supreme Court of New York refused to accept truth as a defense. The following year the New York State Legislature changed the law to allow truth as a defense against a libel charge, breaking with English precedent under which the truthfulness of the statements alone is not a defense. Other states and the federal government followed suit.

=== Pollard v. Lyon ===
In Pollard v. Lyon (1875), the U.S. Supreme Court upheld a District of Columbia U.S. District Court ruling that spoken words by the defendant in the case that accused the plaintiff of fornication were not actionable for slander because fornication, although involving moral turpitude, was not an indictable offense in the District of Columbia at the time, as it had not been an indictable offense in Maryland since 1785 when a provincial law passed in 1715 that banned both fornication and adultery saw only its fornication prohibition repealed by the Maryland General Assembly. When passing the District of Columbia Organic Act of 1801, the 6th United States Congress extended all of the criminal laws of Maryland and Virginia to the respective territory within the District that each state had ceded to the federal government under Article I, Section VIII. In a unanimous decision written by Associate Justice Nathan Clifford, the Waite Court stated that "oral slander, as a cause of action, may be divided into five classes":

1. words falsely spoken of a person which impute to the party the commission of some criminal offense involving moral turpitude, for which the party, if the charge is true, may be indicted and punished;
2. words falsely spoken of a person which impute that the party is infected with some contagious disease, where, if the charge is true, it would exclude the party from society; or
3. defamatory words falsely spoken of a person, which impute to the party unfitness to perform the duties of an office or employment of profit, or the want of integrity in the discharge of the duties of such an office or employment;
4. defamatory words falsely spoken of a party which prejudice such party in his or her profession or trade;
5. defamatory words falsely spoken of a person, which, though not in themselves actionable, occasion the party special damage.

=== New York Times v. Sullivan ===
In 1964, however, the court issued an opinion in New York Times Co. v. Sullivan, 376 U.S. 254 (1964) dramatically changing the nature of libel law in the United States. In that case, the court determined that public officials could win a suit for libel only if they could demonstrate "actual malice" on the part of reporters or publishers. In that case, "actual malice" was defined as "knowledge that the information was false" or that it was published "with reckless disregard of whether it was false or not". This decision was later extended to cover "public figures", although the standard is still considerably lower in the case of private individuals.

=== Notable cases since 1970 ===
In Gertz v. Robert Welch, Inc., 418 U.S. 323 (1974), the Supreme Court suggested that a plaintiff could not win a defamation suit when the statements in question were expressions of opinion rather than fact. In the words of the court, "under the First Amendment, there is no such thing as a false idea". However, the Court subsequently rejected the notion of a First Amendment opinion privilege, in Milkovich v. Lorain Journal Co., 497 U.S. 1 (1990). In Gertz, the Supreme Court also established a mens rea or culpability requirement for defamation; states cannot impose strict liability because that would run afoul of the First Amendment. This holding differs significantly from most other common law jurisdictions, which still have strict liability for defamation.

In Hustler Magazine v. Falwell, 485 U.S. 46 (1988), the Supreme Court ruled that a parody advertisement claiming Jerry Falwell had engaged in an incestuous act with his mother in an outhouse, while false, could not allow Falwell to win damages for emotional distress because the statement was so obviously ridiculous that it was clearly not true; an allegation believed by nobody, it was ruled, brought no liability upon the author. The court thus overturned a lower court's upholding of an award where the jury had decided against the claim of libel but had awarded damages for emotional distress.

After Stratton Oakmont, Inc. v. Prodigy Services Co., 1995 N.Y. Misc. Lexis 229 (N.Y. Sup. Ct. May 24, 1995), applied the standard publisher/distributor test to find an online bulletin board liable for post by a third party, Congress specifically enacted 47 U.S.C. § 230 (1996) to reverse the Prodigy findings and to provide for private blocking and screening of offensive material. § 230(c) states "that no provider or user of an interactive computer shall be treated as a publisher or speaker of any information provided by another information content provider", thereby providing forums immunity for statements provided by third parties. Thereafter, cases such as Zeran v. America Online, 129 F.3d 327 (4th Cir. 1997), and Blumenthal v. Drudge, 992 F. Supp. 44 (D.D.C. 1998), have demonstrated that although courts are expressly uneasy with applying § 230, they are bound to find providers like AOL immune from defamatory postings. This immunity applies even if the providers are notified of defamatory material and neglect to remove it, because provider liability upon notice would likely cause a flood of complaints to providers, would be a large burden on providers, and would have a chilling effect on freedom of speech on the Internet.

In Barrett v. Rosenthal, 146 P.3d 510 (Cal. 2006), the California Supreme Court ruled that 47 U.S.C. § 230(c)(1) does not permit web sites to be sued for libel that was written by other parties.

To solve the problem of libel tourism, the SPEECH Act makes foreign libel judgments unenforceable in U.S. courts, unless those judgments are compliant with the U.S. First Amendment. The act was passed by the 111th United States Congress and signed into law by President Barack Obama.

In 2014 the Ninth Circuit Court ruled in Obsidian Finance Group, LLC v. Cox that liability for a defamatory blog post involving a matter of public concern cannot be imposed without proof of fault and actual damages. Bloggers saying libelous things about private citizens concerning public matters can only be sued if they are negligent i.e., the plaintiff must prove the defendant's negligence – the same standard that applies when news media are sued. The Court held that in defamation cases not the identity of the speaker, but rather the public-figure status of a plaintiff and the public importance of the statement at issue provide the First Amendment foundation.

In June 2024, the Florida First District Court of Appeal upheld the low court's decision allowing claims for punitive damages in Young v. Cable News Network. In January 2025, a Florida jury at the Circuit Court for Bay County found that CNN defamed, Zachary Young, a U.S. Navy veteran, by falsely accusing him of exploiting Afghans fleeing after the U.S. withdrawal in 2021. After the verdict, CNN settled with Young before the jury could assign punitive damages.

== In modern practice ==
In the United States, a comprehensive discussion of what is and is not libel or slander is difficult, because the definition differs between different states. Some states codify what constitutes slander and libel together into the same set of laws. Some states have criminal libel laws on the books, though these are old laws which are very infrequently prosecuted. Washington State has held its criminal libel statute unconstitutional applying the state and federal constitutions to the question.

Most defendants in defamation lawsuits are newspapers or publishers, which are involved in about twice as many lawsuits as are television stations. Most plaintiffs are corporations, businesspeople, entertainers and other public figures, and people involved in criminal cases, usually defendants or convicts but sometimes victims as well. In no state can a defamation claim be successfully maintained if the allegedly defamed person is deceased.

Section 230 of the Communications Decency Act of 1996 generally immunizes from liability parties that create fora on the Internet in which defamation occurs from liability for statements published by third parties. This has the effect of precluding all liability for statements made by persons on the Internet whose identity cannot be determined.

In the various states, whether by case law or legislation, there are generally several "privileges" that can get a defamation case dismissed without proceeding to trial. These include the litigation privilege, which makes statements made in the context of litigation non-actionable, and the allegedly defamatory statement being "fair comment and criticism", as it is important to society that everyone be able to comment on matters of public interest. The United States Supreme Court, however, has declined to hold that the "fair comment" privilege is a constitutional imperative.

One defense is reporting or passing through information as a general information or warning of dangerous or emergent conditions, and intent to defame must be proven. Also, the truth of the allegedly defamatory statement will always negate the claim (whether because the plaintiff fails to meet his/her burden of proving falsity or because the defendant proves the statement to be true).

=== Defamation per se ===
All states except Arkansas, Missouri and Tennessee recognize that some categories of false statements are so innately harmful that they are considered to be defamatory per se. In the common law tradition, damages for such false statements are presumed and do not have to be proven.

Statements are defamatory per se where they falsely impute to the plaintiff one or more of the following things:

- Allegations or imputations "injurious to another in their trade, business, or profession"
- Allegations or imputations of "loathsome disease" (historically leprosy and sexually transmitted disease, now also including mental illness)
- Allegations or imputations of "unchastity" (usually only in unmarried people and sometimes only in women)
- Allegations or imputations of criminal activity (sometimes only crimes of moral turpitude)

=== Criminal defamation ===
On the federal level, there are no criminal defamation or insult laws in the United States. However, 23 states and two territories have criminal defamation/libel/slander laws on the books, along with one state (Iowa) establishing defamation/libel as a criminal offense through case law (without statutorily defined crime) and with one state (South Dakota) whose Constitution allows the possibility of criminal litigation against such offenses but there's neither a statutorily defined crime (the offense is statutorily mentioned but it's not mentioned as either a civil or as a criminal offense), nor is there a legal precedent of prosecuting someone criminally for it set through case law as of yet (so the offense is only existent as a civil offense, not as a crime in practice)

- Alabama (Alabama Revised Statutes, §§ 13A-11-160-13A-11-164)
- Florida (Florida Statutes, §§ 836.01-836.11)
- Idaho (Idaho Code, §§ 18-4801-18-4809)
- Illinois (Illinois Compiled Statutes, Chapter 720 § 300) (related only to banking and trust businesses, not to individuals)
- Iowa (no statutorily defined crime, but article 1, § 7 of the Iowa Constitution states that truth shall be a defense in criminal-libel lawsuits. The case of Park v. Hill 380 F. Supp. 2d 1002 (N. D. Iowa 2005) set the basic rules of Iowa about criminal defamation/libel, defining what it is, while the case of State v. Heacock 76 N. W. 654 (Iowa 1898) set the Iowan rules about public persecution for the crime. Therefore, it exists based on case law).
- Kansas (Kansas Statutes Annotated, § 21-6103(a)(1))
- Kentucky (Kentucky Revised Statutes, § 432.280) (related only to acting judges and courts)
- Louisiana (Louisiana Revised Statutes, § 14:47)
- Massachusetts (Massachusetts Revised Statutes, Ch. 272 § 98C) (related only to publishing materials, aiming at spreading hatred against groups of people of a race, skin color, religion, thus, in practice, serving as a sort of hate crime law, but still, it's classified as libel)
- Michigan (Michigan Compiled Laws, §§ 750.370-750.371)
- Minnesota (Minnesota Statutes. § 609.765)
- Mississippi (Mississippi Code Annotated, §97-3-55)
- Montana (Montana Code Annotated, § 45-8-212)
- Nevada (Nevada Revised Statutes, §§ 200.510–200.560)
- New Hampshire (New Hampshire Revised Statutes Annotated, § 644:11)
- New Mexico (New Mexico Statutes Annotated, § 30-11-1)
- North Carolina (North Carolina General Statutes, § 14-47)
- North Dakota (North Dakota Century Code, § 12.1-15-01)
- Oklahoma (Oklahoma Statutes, tit. 21 §§ 771-781)
- South Carolina (South Carolina Code of Laws, § 16-7-150)
- South Dakota (South Dakota Constitution, Art. 6, § 5)
- Texas (Texas Finance Code, §§59.002; 89.101; 119.202; 122.251; 199.001) (respectively related only to banks, savings and loans associations, savings banks, credit unions, state trust companies)
- Utah (Utah Code Annotated, § 76-9-404)
- Virginia (Virginia Code Annotated, § 18.2-417)
- Wisconsin (Wisconsin Statutes, § 942.01)
- Puerto Rico (Puerto Rico Laws, tit. 33, §§ 4101-4104), which was declared unconstitutional in 2003 by a Federal Court
- Virgin Islands (Virgin Islands Code, Title 14, §§ 1172-1182)

Between 1992 and August 2004, 41 criminal defamation cases were brought to court in the United States, among which six defendants were convicted. From 1965 to 2004, 16 cases ended in final conviction, among which nine resulted in jail sentences (average sentence, 173 days). Other criminal cases resulted in fines (average fine, $1,700), probation (average of 547 days), community service (on average 120 hours), or writing a letter of apology.

=== Opinion privilege ===
Opinion privilege is a protected form of speech, of importance to US federal and state law. The US First Amendment guarantees free speech, subject to certain limitations. One of these limitations is defamation, in various forms, notably libel. While federal precedent does not explicitly state that opinion is protected against prosecution under libel laws (indeed it explicitly states the contrary), the combined effect of several rulings is such as to effectively make such the case. Opinion privilege has its roots in the common law fair comment doctrine. Opinion based on fact is not protected qua opinion, if the opinion is based on false facts. Opinion that implies alleged facts has the same standing as the implied alleged fact.

Fact couched as opinion is not protected. For example, "It is my opinion that he is a liar." would not be treated any differently from "He is a liar."

==== Relevant cases ====
- Ollman v. Evans
- Gertz v. Robert Welch, Inc.
- Milkovich v. Lorain Journal Co.
- Hustler Magazine v. Falwell
- Spence v. Flynt 816 P.2d 771 (Wyo. 1991)

==== Related Reading ====
- Restatement (Second) of Torts
- Nat Stem,Defamation, Epistemology, and the Erosion (But Not Destruction) of the Opinion Privilege
- Esward M. Sussman, Milkovich revisited: "Saving" the Opinion Privilege, Duke Law Journal, pp. 415-448
- Jeffrey E. Thomas, Statements of Fact, Statements of Opinion, and the First Amendment, 74 Cal. L. Rev. pages 1001-1058 (1986).

== See also ==
- Chilling effect
- False statements of fact
- Free speech
- Prior restraint
- Food libel laws
- Freedom of speech in the United States
- Freedom of the press in the United States
- Censorship in the United States
- United States free speech exceptions
