= Rosenbloom v. Metromedia, Inc. =

Rosenbloom v. Metromedia
- Supreme Court of the United States

Argued December 7, 1970 Decided June 7, 1971
- Full case name: Rosenbloom v. Metromedia
- Citations: 403 U.S. 29 (more) 91 S. Ct. 1811; 29 L. Ed. 2d 296

Holding
- The knowingly and recklessly false standard for defamatory statements should apply to private individuals as well as public officials.

Court membership
- Chief Justice Warren E. Burger Associate Justices Hugo Black · William O. Douglas; John M. Harlan II · William J. Brennan Jr. Potter Stewart · Byron White; Thurgood Marshall · Harry Blackmun

Case opinions
- Plurality: Brennan, joined by Burger, Blackmun
- Concurrence: Black (in the judgment)
- Concurrence: White (in the judgment)
- Dissent: Harlan
- Dissent: Marshall, joined by Stewart
- Douglas took no part in the consideration or decision of the case.

Rosenbloom v. Metromedia, Inc., 403 U.S. 29 (1971), was a United States Supreme Court case of libel brought by George Rosenbloom against Metromedia. This case was responsible for establishing the idea that the knowingly and recklessly false standard (known as the "actual malice" test) for defamatory statements should apply to private individuals as well as public officials in matters of public concern. Concluding that the story was a matter of public concern, the Supreme Court ruled that it did not matter that Rosenbloom was a private citizen; however, the evidence provided in the case did not support the damages awarded to Rosenbloom. The decision was made June 7, 1971 with a 5-3 decision.

== Background ==
A byproduct of the First Amendment, the court had been forced to provide limitations outlining the offense of libel. This was the topic of a series of court cases, two of the most famous being New York Times Co. v. Sullivan and Gertz v. Robert Welch, Inc.. At the focal point of these cases was the "knowingly and recklessly false" requirement, which had been used to protect public officials from libel. After raiding his home, George Rosenbloom was arrested in Philadelphia in October 1963 for distribution of nudist magazines, and a news outlet that reported every half-hour broadcast reported on the arrest of George Rosenbloom using his name when talking about police seizure of "obscene books". Later stories run by Metromedia excluded Rosenbloom's name, when using language such as "girlie look peddlers" and "smut distributors". After his acquittal of criminal obscenity charges in May 1964, Rosenbloom filed a suit in the District Court under the Pennsylvania libel law. Rosenbloom claimed that the depiction of his arrest as well as the description of the books were both proved false from his acquittal as well as defamatory. The outcome of this case lead to Rosenbloom being awarded $25,000 in general damages and $725,000 in punitive damages.

== Decision ==
The Supreme Court made a 5-3 majority decision that upheld the ruling as it was made in the United States Court of Appeals for the Third Circuit. In conjunction with the decision being upheld, the Supreme Court reduced the punitive damages from the originally-awarded $725,000 to $250,000.
