= Hustler Magazine v. Falwell =

- Supreme Court of the United States

Argued December 2, 1987 Decided February 24, 1988
- Full case name: Hustler Magazine and Larry C. Flynt, Petitioners v. Jerry Falwell
- Citations: 485 U.S. 46 (more) 108 S. Ct. 876; 99 L. Ed. 2d 41; 1988 U.S. LEXIS 941; 56 U.S.L.W. 4180; 14 Media L. Rep. 2281
- Argument: Oral argument

Case history
- Prior: Judgment for plaintiff, W.D. Va.; affirmed, 797 F.2d 1270 (4th Cir. 1986); rehearing and rehearing en banc denied, 805 F.2d 484 (4th Cir. 1986); cert. granted, 480 U.S. 945 (1987).
- Subsequent: None

Holding
- Parodies of public figures which could not reasonably be taken as true are protected against civil liability by the First Amendment, even if intended to cause emotional distress. Fourth Circuit Court of Appeals reversed.

Court membership
- Chief Justice William Rehnquist Associate Justices William J. Brennan Jr. · Byron White; Thurgood Marshall · Harry Blackmun; John P. Stevens · Sandra Day O'Connor; Antonin Scalia · Anthony Kennedy

Case opinions
- Majority: Rehnquist, joined by Brennan, Marshall, Blackmun, Stevens, O'Connor, Scalia
- Concurrence: White
- Kennedy took no part in the consideration or decision of the case.

Laws applied
- U.S. Const. amend. I, Fourteenth Amendment to the United States Constitution

Hustler Magazine, Inc. v. Falwell, 485 U.S. 46 (1988), is a landmark decision by the Supreme Court of the United States in which the Court held that parodies of public figures, even those intending to cause emotional distress, are protected by the First and Fourteenth Amendments to the U.S. Constitution.

In the case, Hustler magazine ran a full-page parody ad against televangelist and political commentator Jerry Falwell Sr., depicting him as an incestuous drunk who had sex with his mother in an outhouse. The ad was marked as a parody that was "not to be taken seriously". In response, Falwell sued Hustler and the magazine's publisher Larry Flynt for intentional infliction of emotional distress, libel, and invasion of privacy, but Flynt defended the ad's publication as protected by the First Amendment.

In an 8–0 decision, the Court held that the emotional distress inflicted on Falwell by the ad was not a sufficient reason to deny the First Amendment protection to speech that is critical of public officials and public figures.

Constitutional limits to defamation liability cannot be circumvented for claims arising from speech by asserting an alternative theory of tort liability such as intentional infliction of emotional distress.

== Background ==
Hustler's parody, depicted above, includes the unauthorized use of a publicity photograph of Falwell and a near-exact duplicate of the typesetting used in a concurrent Campari advertising campaign.

Known for its explicit pictures of nude women, crude humor, and political satire, Hustler, a monthly magazine published by Larry Flynt, printed a parody ad in its November 1983 issue that targeted Jerry Falwell, a prominent Christian fundamentalist televangelist and conservative political commentator.

The parody was mimicking the popular advertising campaigns that Campari, an Italian liqueur, was running at the time that featured brief contrived interviews with various celebrities that always started with a question about their "first time", a double-entendre intended to give the impression that the celebrities were talking about their first sexual encounters before the reveal at the end that the discussion had actually concerned the celebrities' first time tasting Campari.

The Hustler parody, created by writer Terry Abrahamson and art director Mike Salisbury, included a headshot photo of Falwell and the transcript of a spoof interview, where, misunderstanding the interviewer's question about his "first time", "Falwell" casually shares details about his first sexual encounter, an incestuous rendezvous with his mother in the family outhouse while they were both "drunk off our God-fearing asses on Campari." In the spoof interview, "Falwell" goes on to say that he was so intoxicated that "Mom looked better than a Baptist whore with a $100 donation," and that he decided to have sex with her because she "showed all the other guys in town such a good time." When the interviewer asked if Falwell ever tried "it" again, once again mistaking the interviewer's intention, "Falwell" responded, "Sure ... lots of times. But not in the outhouse. Between mom and the shit, the flies were too much to bear." Finally, the interviewer clarifies that he's asking if Falwell had tried Campari again, "Falwell" answered, "I always get sloshed before I go out to the pulpit. You don't think I could lay down all that bullshit sober, do you?"

The ad carried a disclaimer in small print at the bottom of the page that said, "ad parody – not to be taken seriously", and the magazine's table of contents also listed the ad as: "Fiction; Ad and Personality Parody".

Falwell sued Flynt, Hustler magazine, and Flynt's distribution company in the United States District Court for the Western District of Virginia for libel, invasion of privacy, and intentional infliction of emotional distress. Before trial, the court granted Flynt's motion for summary judgment on the claim of invasion of privacy, and the remaining two claims proceeded to trial. A jury ruled against Falwell on the libel claim, stating that the parody could not "reasonably be understood as describing actual facts about [Falwell] or actual events in which [he] participated." On the claim of intentional infliction of emotional distress, the jury ruled in favor of Falwell and awarded him $150,000 in damages.

Flynt appealed to the Fourth Circuit. The Fourth Circuit affirmed, rejecting Flynt's argument that the actual-malice standard of New York Times Company v. Sullivan, applied in cases of intentional infliction of emotional distress where the plaintiff was a public figure, as Falwell concededly was. The New York Times standard focused too heavily on the truth of the statement at issue; for the Fourth Circuit, it was enough that Virginia law required the defendant to act intentionally. After the Fourth Circuit declined to rehear the case en banc, the U.S. Supreme Court granted Flynt's request to hear the case.

== Opinion of the court in summary ==
"At the heart of the First Amendment is the recognition of the fundamental importance of the free flow of ideas and opinions on matters of public interest and concern. The freedom to speak one's mind is not only an aspect of individual liberty – and thus a good unto itself – but also is essential to the common quest for truth and the vitality of society as a whole. We have therefore been particularly vigilant to ensure that individual expressions of ideas remain free from governmentally imposed sanctions." The First Amendment envisions that the sort of robust political debate that takes place in a democracy will occasionally yield speech critical of public figures who are "intimately involved in the resolution of important public questions or, by reason of their fame, shape events in areas of concern to society at large". In New York Times v. Sullivan, the court held that the First Amendment gives speakers immunity from sanction with respect to their speech concerning public figures unless their speech is both false and made with "actual malice", i.e., with knowledge of its falsehood or with reckless disregard for the truth of the statement. Although false statements lack inherent value, the "breathing space" that freedom of expression requires in order to flourish must tolerate occasional false statements, lest there be an intolerable chilling effect on speech that does have constitutional value.

To be sure, in other areas of the law, the specific intent to inflict emotional harm enjoys no protection. But with respect to speech concerning public figures, penalizing the intent to inflict emotional harm, without also requiring that the speech that inflicts that harm to be false, would subject political cartoonists and other satirists to large damage awards. "The appeal of the political cartoon or caricature is often based on exploitation of unfortunate physical traits or politically embarrassing events – an exploitation often calculated to injure the feelings of the subject of the portrayal". This was certainly true of the cartoons of Thomas Nast, who skewered Boss Tweed in the pages of Harper's Weekly. From a historical perspective, political discourse would have been considerably poorer without such cartoons.

Even if Nast's cartoons were not particularly offensive, Falwell argued that the Hustler parody advertisement in this case was so "outrageous" as to take it outside the scope of First Amendment protection. But "outrageous" is an inherently subjective term, susceptible to the personal taste of the jury empaneled to decide a case. Such a standard "runs afoul of our longstanding refusal to allow damages to be awarded because the speech in question may have an adverse emotional impact on the audience". So long as the speech at issue is not "obscene" and thus not subject to First Amendment protection, it should be subject to the actual-malice standard when it concerns public figures.

Clearly, Falwell was a public figure for purposes of First Amendment law. Because the district court found in favor of Flynt on the libel charge, there was no dispute as to whether the parody could be understood as describing facts about Falwell or events in which he participated. Accordingly, because the parody did not make false statements that were implied to be true, it could not be the subject of damages under the New York Times actual-malice standard. The court thus reversed the judgment of the Fourth Circuit.

== Aftermath ==
=== Dramatization ===
The People vs. Larry Flynt, a 1996 film directed by Miloš Forman starring Woody Harrelson as Flynt and Edward Norton as Flynt's lawyer Alan Isaacman features the case prominently. Burt Neuborne, a civil rights attorney, First Amendment advocate and law professor who contributed to Flynt's defense, reversed roles and played Jerry Falwell's lawyer in the film.

=== Flynt–Falwell relationship ===
After The People vs. Larry Flynt appeared, Falwell and Flynt began meeting in person to discuss philosophy. They visited colleges to publicly debate morality and the First Amendment, and exchanged Christmas cards and family photos. After Falwell's death in 2007, Flynt wrote in the Los Angeles Times: "the ultimate result was one I never expected ... We became friends".

== See also ==
Caselaw

- New York Times Co. v. Sullivan, 376 U.S. 254 (1964) — "actual malice" standard for press reporting about public figure to be libel.
- Gertz v. Robert Welch, Inc., 418 U.S. 323 (1974) — opinion is not libel; "actual malice" not necessary for defamation of private person if negligence is present.
- Westmoreland v. CBS (1985)
- Milkovich v. Lorain Journal Co., 497 U.S. 1 (1990) — existing law sufficient to protect free speech without recognizing opinion privilege against libel claims.

Lists

- List of United States Supreme Court cases
- List of United States Supreme Court cases by the Rehnquist Court
- Lists of United States Supreme Court cases by volume
- List of United States Supreme Court cases, volume 485

Other

- The Entry
