= List of United States Supreme Court cases, volume 403 =

List of all the United States Supreme Court cases from volume 403 of the United States Reports:

Case name	Citation	Date decided
Gordon v. Lance	403 U.S. 1	1971
Utah v. United States	403 U.S. 9	1971
Cohen v. California	403 U.S. 15	1971
Rosenbloom v. Metromedia, Inc.	403 U.S. 29	1971
Griffin v. Breckenridge	403 U.S. 88	1971
Ely v. Klahr	403 U.S. 108	1971
Whitcomb v. Chavis	403 U.S. 124	1971
Abate v. Mundt	403 U.S. 182	1971
United States v. Mitchell (1971)	403 U.S. 190	1971
Connell v. Higginbotham	403 U.S. 207	1971
Johnson v. Mississippi	403 U.S. 212	1971
Palmer v. Thompson	403 U.S. 217	1971
Motor Coach Employees v. Lockridge	403 U.S. 274	1971
Hodgson v. Steelworkers	403 U.S. 333	1971
Comm'r v. Lincoln Sav. & Loan Ass'n	403 U.S. 345	1971
Graham v. Richardson	403 U.S. 365	1971
Simpson v. Florida	403 U.S. 384	1971
Bivens v. Six Unknown Named Agents	403 U.S. 388	1971
Jenness v. Fortson	403 U.S. 431	1971
Coolidge v. New Hampshire	403 U.S. 443	1971
McKeiver v. Pennsylvania	403 U.S. 528	1971
United States v. Harris (1971)	403 U.S. 573	1971
Lemon v. Kurtzman	403 U.S. 602	1971
Tilton v. Richardson	403 U.S. 672	1971
Clay v. United States	403 U.S. 698	1971
Hunter v. Tennessee	403 U.S. 711	1971
New York Times Co. v. United States	403 U.S. 713	1971
Perry v. Sindermann	403 U.S. 917	1971
