= Graham v. Richardson =

- Supreme Court of the United States

Argued March 22, 1971 Decided June 14, 1971
- Full case name: Graham, Commissioner, Department of Public Welfare of Arizona v. Richardson, et al.
- Citations: 403 U.S. 365 (more) 91 S. Ct. 1848; 29 L. Ed. 2d 534; 1971 U.S. LEXIS 28

Holding
- Resident aliens are a suspect class because they are a "discrete and insular minority" as well as politically powerless. Laws discriminating against resident aliens must therefore be held to a strict scrutiny standard.

Court membership
- Chief Justice Warren E. Burger Associate Justices Hugo Black · William O. Douglas; John M. Harlan II · William J. Brennan Jr. Potter Stewart · Byron White; Thurgood Marshall · Harry Blackmun

Case opinions
- Majority: Blackmun, joined by Burger, Black, Douglas, Brennan, Stewart, White, Marshall
- Concurrence: Harlan (in judgment and in parts III, IV)

Graham v. Richardson, 403 U.S. 365 (1971), was a United States Supreme Court case in which the Court determined that state restrictions on welfare benefits for legal aliens but not for citizens violated the Equal Protection Clause of the Fourteenth Amendment. The Court invalidated an Arizona law that required citizenship or 15 years of residence to receive welfare benefits. The 9–0 decision was written by Harry A. Blackmun.

The state argued that rational basis review should apply, which would require the non-citizen to prove that the law served no conceivable legitimate state interest, or alternatively that the law was not rationally related to the government's purpose. However, the court applied the strict scrutiny standard, holding, "Aliens as a class are a prime example of a 'discrete and insular' minority for whom such heightened judicial solicitude is appropriate."
