= Ivan Veit =

Ivan Bertram Veit (May 31, 1908 – November 27, 2004) was the executive vice president of The New York Times.

== Biography ==
Veit was born in Hornell, New York on May 31, 1908, and graduated from Columbia University, Phi Beta Kappa, in 1928.

Upon graduating from college, he joined The New York Times on his twentieth birthday as a telephone solicitor before becoming promotion manager in 1935. Veit served in the Pacific Theater during World War II and returned as director of promotion and research at The Times.

In 1963, he became a vice president of The Times. From 1970 to 1973, he was the executive vice president in charge of development and planning of the paper and approves all the company's major business decisions. He was a defendant in a civil lawsuit brought by the United States Department of Justice, which sought to permanently enjoin The Times and its officers from publishing the Pentagon Papers, leading to the landmark decision of New York Times Co. v. United States.

From 1973 to 1974, Veit served as special assistant to the publisher Punch Sulzberger. He also served on the board of The New York Times Company from 1974 to 1979.

Veit was credited by the paper as having "professionalize[d] the field of newspaper circulation" and expanded its multimedia presence by creating book-publishing and educational programs. In 1972, he was described by New York magazine as the "only broadly capable businessman in the upper ranks of the company." Gay Talese characterized him as a "smallish, bow-tied, dark, very capable man."

An active alumnus, he received a University Alumni Medal from Columbia University in 1978 and a John Jay Award from Columbia College in 1982. He also served on the board of visitors of Columbia College.

He died on November 27 in Beacon, New York at age 96.
