= Palmer v. Thompson =

- Supreme Court of the United States

Argued December 14, 1970 Decided June 14, 1971
- Full case name: Hazel Palmer et al. v. Allen C. Thompson, Mayor, City of Jackson, et al.
- Citations: 403 U.S. 217 (more) 91 S. Ct. 1940; 29 L. Ed. 2d 438; 1971 U.S. LEXIS 27

Case history
- Prior: 391 F.2d 324 (5th Cir. 1967); affirmed on rehearing en banc, 419 F.2d 1222 (5th Cir. 1969); cert. granted, 397 U.S. 1035 (1970).

Holding
- A city may choose not to operate desegregated facilities if its decision appears neutral.

Court membership
- Chief Justice Warren E. Burger Associate Justices Hugo Black · William O. Douglas; John M. Harlan II · William J. Brennan Jr. Potter Stewart · Byron White; Thurgood Marshall · Harry Blackmun

Case opinions
- Majority: Black, joined by Burger, Harlan, Stewart, Blackmun
- Concurrence: Burger
- Concurrence: Blackmun
- Dissent: Douglas
- Dissent: White, joined by Brennan and Marshall
- Dissent: Marshall, joined by Brennan and White

Laws applied
- U.S. Const. amends. XIII, XIV

Palmer v. Thompson, 403 U.S. 217 (1971), is a United States Supreme Court civil rights case which concerned the interpretation of the Equal Protection Clause of the Fourteenth Amendment. While it has never been overruled, it is nonetheless considered bad law and part of the anticanon of American constitutional jurisprudence.

== Background ==
The city of Jackson, Mississippi, closed all of its public swimming pools, as opposed to integrating them. Originally, there were five public pools, but the city closed four of them and surrendered its lease to the fifth pool to the lessor, the YMCA, which continued to operate the pool privately and on a segregated basis. Hazel Palmer, mother of a freedom rider who was arrested at the bus station, and other black citizens filed suit against the city under the Fourteenth Amendment's guarantee of equal protection and under the Thirteenth Amendment, on the grounds that the city's actions created a "badge or incident" of slavery. The lower courts found no constitutional violation.

On appeal to the Supreme Court, the case was argued by Paul A. Rosen and William Kunstler for the petitioners. With them on the briefs were Ernest Goodman and Arthur Kinoy. The case was argued for the respondents by William F. Goodman, Jr.

== Holding ==
The Supreme Court held in its syllabus, "The closing of the pools to all persons did not constitute a denial of equal protection of the laws under the Fourteenth Amendment to the Negroes." The court stated "there was no evidence that the city conspired with the YMCA that its pool be segregated." The court further rejected the equal protection argument that the city's action "was motivated by a desire to avoid integration of the races" because "no case in this Court has held that a legislative act may violate equal protection solely because of the motivations of the men who voted for it."

== Legacy ==
The case was cited by the United States Department of Justice in defending President Donald Trump's travel bans.
