= Milkovich v. Lorain Journal Co. =

- Supreme Court of the United States

Argued April 24, 1990 Decided June 21, 1990
- Full case name: Michael Milkovich v. Lorain Journal Company, et al.
- Citations: 497 U.S. 1 (more) 110 S. Ct. 2695; 111 L. Ed. 2d 1; 1990 U.S. LEXIS 3296; 58 U.S.L.W. 4846; 17 Media L. Rep. 2009

Case history
- Prior: Directed verdict for respondents, Court of Common Pleas, Lake County, Ohio; reversed and remanded, 65 Ohio App. 2d 143, 416 N.E.2d 662 (App. Ct. 11th 1979); appeal dismissed by Supreme Court of Ohio; certiorari denied, 449 U.S. 966 (1980); summary judgment to petitioner at trial court; affirmed on appeal; reversed and remanded, 15 Ohio St.3d 292, 473 N.E.2d 1191 (1984); cert. denied, 474 U.S. 953 (1985); trial court, summary judgment in favor of respondents; affirmed, 46 Ohio App. 3d 20; appeal dismissed, Supreme Court of Ohio; cert. granted, 493 U.S. 1055 (1990).
- Subsequent: Settled out of court

Holding
- The First Amendment does not require a separate "opinion" privilege limiting the application of state defamation laws. Supreme Court of Ohio reversed and remanded.

Court membership
- Chief Justice William Rehnquist Associate Justices William J. Brennan Jr. · Byron White; Thurgood Marshall · Harry Blackmun; John P. Stevens · Sandra Day O'Connor; Antonin Scalia · Anthony Kennedy

Case opinions
- Majority: Rehnquist, joined by White, Blackmun, Stevens, O'Connor, Scalia, Kennedy
- Dissent: Brennan, joined by Marshall

Laws applied
- U.S. Const. amend. I

Milkovich v. Lorain Journal Co., 497 U.S. 1 (1990), was a United States Supreme Court case that rejected the argument that a separate opinion privilege existed against libel. It was seen by legal commentators as the end of an era that began with New York Times Co. v. Sullivan and continued with Gertz v. Robert Welch, Inc., in which the court clarified and greatly expanded the range and scope of what could be said in the press without fear of litigation.

The case took a long time to come before the court, which twice declined to hear it. When it finally did, the justices suggested they would clarify once and for all the extent to which opinions could be expressed without fear of being held libellous. The actual decision, however, was regarded as having confused the issue somewhat instead. Several state courts have responded by recognizing an opinion privilege in some way as part of their state constitution.

== Background of the case ==
On February 8, 1974, a key high school wrestling match between teams from the Cleveland suburbs of Maple Heights and Mentor, fierce rivals at the time, degenerated into a brawl in which first the Maple Heights team, then its fans, attacked the Mentor squad. Several members were hospitalized as a result.

Allegedly, many present believed that Mike Milkovich, then the Maple Heights High School coach, had played a large part in causing the brawl by publicly criticizing decisions made by referees and inciting the crowd. At a hearing shortly afterwards, the Ohio High School Athletic Association (OHSAA) put the school on probation for a year and ruled Maple Heights ineligible for the next year's state tournament.

Several wrestlers and their parents filed suit in the Court of Common Pleas of Franklin County, where cases against the state are commonly heard. Petitioners argued that OHSAA had denied them due process. After a hearing that November in which both Milkovich and the school district's superintendent, H. Donald Scott, testified again, the court granted a temporary injunction against OHSAA's ruling.

The following day, Ted Diadiun, a sports writer and columnist for the News Herald, Mentor's daily newspaper, wrote about the decision. He had been at the original wrestling match and the OHSAA hearing but not at the court hearing. He did, however, quote OHSAA commissioner Harold Meyer as saying that "some of the stories told to the judge sounded pretty darned unfamiliar ... It certainly sounded different from what they told us" but without citing any specific examples.

On that apparent basis, his column took it as a given that Milkovich and Scott had lied to the court and took them to task for demonstrating to their students that they could do so with impunity in order to avoid accountability for their actions. "Anyone who attended the meet," Diadiun wrote, "whether he be from Maple Heights, Mentor, or impartial observer, knows in his heart that Milkovich and Scott lied at the hearing after each having given his solemn oath to tell the truth."

== Litigation history ==
Milkovich filed suit, alleging that the suggestion that he had lied had defamed him. Since perjury is a felony in Ohio, the statements were found to be defamatory and Milkovich was ruled a private figure, both of which were helpful to his case. However, the trial court granted a directed verdict in favor of the newspaper since it found Diadiun's column to be a statement of opinion, which cannot be libelous, and that there was no actual malice, per Sullivan. Milkovich appealed to the Ohio Eleventh District Court of Appeals, which found that there was actual malice. In turn, the newspaper appealed to the state Supreme Court, which dismissed it on the grounds that there were no significant constitutional issues. In 1979 the U.S. Supreme Court denied certiorari.

On remand, the trial court issued summary judgment in favor of the respondents, this time citing Gertz in ruling the original column to be constitutionally protected opinion. In addition, it said, Milkovich had failed, as a public figure, to establish a prima facie claim of actual malice. The appeals court upheld the trial court once again, only to be reversed by the Ohio Supreme Court. Another certiorari petition made its way to Washington in 1984, and met with the same fate as its predecessor.

In the interim, Scott had been pursuing a separate action which the Ohio Supreme Court considered in 1986. In ruling the column to be opinion, OSC applied a four-pronged test which had come out of Ollman v. Evans, a decision of the United States Court of Appeals for the District of Columbia Circuit, in determining whether Diadiun's column was opinion or fact for purposes of libel law. It announced also that it was reconsidering its decision in Milkovich. The trial court again granted summary judgment, the appeals court upheld and the state Supreme Court, as it had the first time around, dismissed the appeal. This time the U.S. Supreme Court granted certiorari.

== The court's decision ==
Observers and First Amendment law experts had expected that the Court would formalize its observation in Gertz that "there is no such thing as a false idea" into an opinion privilege against libel claims, expanding the traditional fair comment defense. They were taken aback when it declined to, instead suggesting that the constitutional safeguards it had already erected were enough to protect statements of opinion from being actionable.

=== Majority opinion ===
After recounting the case history and the court's recent rulings in libel cases, Chief Justice Rehnquist wrote for the majority that the statement from Gertz was not "intended to create a wholesale defamation exemption for anything that might be labeled 'opinion'" since "expressions of 'opinion' may often imply an assertion of objective fact." Diadiun's column, it found, strongly suggested that Milkovich perjured himself and was not couched hyperbolically, figuratively or in any other way that would mean the writer didn't seriously mean it. And since that statement could easily be found true or false by comparing Milkovich's statements at the OHSAA hearing with his court testimony (which the column did not do), it was moot whether it was intended as opinion or not since it asserted a matter of objective fact. "The connotation that petitioner committed perjury is sufficiently factual to be susceptible of being proved true or false," the Court concluded.

=== Dissent ===
"The majority does not rest its decision today on any finding that the statements at issue explicitly state a false and defamatory fact. Nor could it," wrote Justice Brennan in his dissent. He and Justice Marshall agreed with the lower courts that there was sufficient indication that the column was opinion to protect it as such: it was on the sports page, it had a picture of the author with "TD Says" in it, and in the text itself, "Diadiun not only reveals the facts upon which he is relying, but he makes it clear at which point he runs out of facts and is simply guessing." He notes that Diadiun used "apparently" when referring to Milkovich and Scott's testimony in Columbus and that no one could take "knows in his heart" as a statement of literal fact, as it is inherently hyperbolic. "Readers could see that Diadiun was focused on the court's reversal of the OHSAA's decision, and was angrily supposing what must have led to it," he concluded. Citing several recent historical incidents where many commentators had speculated as to what had occurred with much less complete knowledge of the facts, he said "conjecture is a means of fueling a national discourse on such questions and stimulating public pressure for answers from those who know more ... Punishing (it) protects reputation only at the cost of expunging a genuinely useful mechanism for public debate."

Nonetheless, even in arguing for Diadiun's right to express such a bold opinion without fear of being sued, he chastised the columnist for his "naïveté" in assuming that since the court overturned OHSAA, Milkovich had therefore lied under oath. "To anyone who understands the patois of the legal profession, there is no reason to assume — from the court's decision — that such testimony must have been given," since the Franklin County judge could have overturned the athletic association's decision for a number of reasons and the column itself notes the denial of due process as the reason.

== Subsequent jurisprudence ==
Lower courts had been relying on their standards for distinguishing expressions of opinion from statements of fact in defamation actions for several years' Having expected Milkovich to give them some test or standard to apply, they were caught off guard when the Supreme Court backed off..

Since Milkovich, there have been no significant defamation rulings by the court. Free-speech advocates, however, continue to press and hope for the recognition of an opinion privilege.

In 2004, the court denied certiorari in Santa Barbara News-Press v. Ross, a case in which the appellant sought to establish that corporate executives such as the appellee were automatically public figures.

=== State interpretations ===
State courts responded by filling in the gap, grounding an opinion privilege in their own constitutions. New York's ruled that as long as an opinion relied on accurately stated and reported facts, it was not actionable as long as the content, tone and apparent purpose of the statement distinguished it as opinion. This privilege does not apply, however, to any accusations of criminal or illegal activity.

Illinois courts required that the factual basis of a statement must be clearly disclosed for it to qualify as opinion. Any statement of opinion without underlying facts is to be treated as a factual assertion per se. If it implies the existence of undisclosed facts which are false and defamatory, it is actionable. False statements of fact couched in an opinion context are actionable unless clearly set aside by "loose, figurative or hyperbolic language."

Texas applied Milkovich more literally. Prior to it, only statements of fact were actionable. Afterwards, opinions that imply false statements of objective fact were held by at least one court to be unprotected, and it declared that there was no opinion privilege in Texas.

In 1991, a California appellate court, in the case Kahn v. Bower, rejected the claim that a "categorical exception for opinion exists independently under California law".

== Disposition ==
After the Supreme Court ruled against them, the Journal Co. reached an out of court settlement with Milkovich, who had by that time retired. Milkovich and Diadiun have since reconciled and appeared together at panel discussions of the case and First Amendment law.

Diadiun remains in journalism, serving as an editorial writer for The Plain Dealer and cleveland.com.

== See also ==
- List of United States Supreme Court cases, volume 497
- List of United States Supreme Court cases
- Lists of United States Supreme Court cases by volume
- List of United States Supreme Court cases by the Rehnquist Court
