= Gertz v. Robert Welch, Inc. =

- Supreme Court of the United States

Argued November 14, 1973 Decided June 25, 1974
- Full case name: Elmer Gertz v. Robert Welch, Incorporated
- Citations: 418 U.S. 323 (more) 94 S. Ct. 2997; 41 L. Ed. 2d 789; 1974 U.S. LEXIS 88; 1 Media L. Rep. 1633

Case history
- Prior: Motion to dismiss denied, 306 F. Supp. 310 (N.D. Ill. 1969); judgment for plaintiff, N.D. Ill.; judgment set aside, judgment for defendant, 322 F. Supp. 997 (N.D. Ill. 1970); affirmed, 471 F.2d 801 (7th Cir. 1972); rehearing denied, 7th Circuit, 9-7-72; cert. granted, 410 U.S. 925 (1973).
- Subsequent: Retrial on remand, judgment for plaintiff, N.D. Ill.; affirmed, 680 F.2d 527 (7th Cir. 1982); certiorari denied, 459 U.S. 1226 (1983).

Holding
- The First Amendment permits states to formulate their own standards of libel for defamatory statements made about private figures, as long as liability is not imposed without fault. Seventh Circuit reversed.

Court membership
- Chief Justice Warren E. Burger Associate Justices William O. Douglas · William J. Brennan Jr. Potter Stewart · Byron White; Thurgood Marshall · Harry Blackmun; Lewis F. Powell Jr. · William Rehnquist

Case opinions
- Majority: Powell, joined by Stewart, Marshall, Blackmun, Rehnquist
- Concurrence: Blackmun
- Dissent: Burger
- Dissent: Douglas
- Dissent: Brennan
- Dissent: White

Laws applied
- U.S. Const. amend. I

Gertz v. Robert Welch, Inc., 418 U.S. 323 (1974), is a landmark decision of the US Supreme Court establishing the standard of First Amendment protection against defamation claims brought by private individuals. The Court held that, so long as they do not impose liability without fault, states are free to establish their own standards of liability for defamatory statements made about private individuals. However, the Court also ruled that if the state standard is lower than actual malice, the standard applying to public figures, then only actual damages may be awarded.

The consequence of Gertz is that strict liability for defamation is unconstitutional in the United States; the plaintiff must be able to show that the defendant acted negligently or with an even higher level of mens rea. This conflicts with the law in many other common law countries where strict liability for defamation is the rule.

== Background of the case ==
In 1968, a Chicago police officer, Richard Nuccio, shot and killed Ronald Nelson. After Nuccio was convicted of second-degree murder, Nelson's family retained lawyer Elmer Gertz to represent them in civil litigation against him.

A year later, American Opinion, a publication of the John Birch Society, ran a series of articles falsely alleging the existence of a Communist conspiracy to discredit local police agencies and thus facilitate their replacement by a national police force that could more effectively implement the dictatorship they allegedly planned to impose on the country. One of those touched on the Nuccio case, claiming that the officer had been framed at his criminal trial and making allegations that Gertz had orchestrated his conviction and was a member of various communist front organizations. It further implied that he had a lengthy criminal record himself and used various anti-communist terms of abuse ("Leninist", "Communist-fronter") to describe him.

== Lower court ==
Gertz filed suit in District Court for the Northern District of Illinois against Robert Welch, Inc. (the John Birch Society's legal name), claiming its article had defamed and injured his reputation as a lawyer. The John Birch Society moved for summary judgment, arguing that Gertz was a public figure under the recently enunciated Curtis Publishing Co. v. Butts standard, which applied the New York Times Co. v. Sullivan standard to anyone who was sufficiently public, not just government officials. Thus, it was argued, their statements about him were specially privileged and the plaintiff would have to demonstrate actual malice. However, the magazine's editor admitted in an affidavit filed with the motion that he had made no independent effort to verify the claims in the article and had simply relied on the author's reputation and previous work.

The court denied the motion, suggesting that Gertz would need to prove only negligence. At the summing up, however, the court determined that he was neither a public figure nor a public official and instructed the jury to consider only damages, including punitive damages. Gertz was awarded $50,000.

However, the defendants filed a "motion for judgment notwithstanding the verdict, or in the alternative for a new trial", which Judge Decker allowed on the grounds that closer reading of the law persuaded him that New York Times applied insofar as it brought "matters of public interest" into the scope of requiring "actual malice" (knowledge of untruth or reckless disregard for the truth). Decker opined in a memorandum opinion that Gertz had failed to show actual malice. Gertz remarked in his book that since he had been specifically instructed that there was no need to show actual malice, he expected, at that point in the opinion, a new trial to be ordered.

Gertz appealed to contest the applicability of the New York Times standard to this case. The Court of Appeals for the Seventh Circuit affirmed the trial court's verdict.

== Supreme Court ==
The Supreme Court held for Gertz in a 5–4 majority opinion written by Justice Lewis F. Powell Jr., with a separate concurrence by Justice Harry Blackmun. All four dissenting justices filed separate opinions.

=== Majority opinion ===
After reviewing the case history and prior decisions, Justice Lewis F. Powell, Jr. began with a reminder that "under the First Amendment there is no such thing as a false idea ... (it) requires that we protect some falsehood in order to protect speech that matters."

However, Powell rejected the idea that the mere public interest of the subject should outweigh any consideration of Gertz's status as a private or public figure. The latter, he noted, have access to more ways of counteracting allegations about them than private figures do, and thus deserve a higher standard to prove libel. He also highly doubted that one could involuntarily become a public figure.

Powell stated that Gertz "had achieved no general fame or notoriety in the community," despite having done some public service in the past, and therefore did not meet the New York Times or Curtis Publishing tests. He wrote that Gertz "plainly did not thrust himself into the vortex of this public issue, nor did he engage the public's attention in an attempt to influence its outcome."

Powell concluded that "the States should retain substantial latitude in their efforts to enforce a legal remedy for defamatory falsehood injurious to the reputation of a private individual." However, Powell also held that states could not impose a strict liability standard for defamation (i.e., plaintiffs had to be able to show fault of some kind) and that juries could not be allowed to award punitive damages, such as the $50,000 Gertz had received, absent any showing of actual malice, since juries could use that power to punish unpopular opinions. A new trial was ordered.

=== Concurrence ===
Justice Harry Blackmun's short concurrence praised his fellow justices for clarifying an issue that he felt had been left undecided in 1971's Rosenbloom v. Metromedia, Inc., one of the earlier defamation cases. He also dismissed fears expressed by dissenters that the press was now too unconstrained: "What the Court has done, I believe, will have little, if any, practical effect on the functioning of responsible journalism."

=== Dissents ===
The dissenting Justices' disagreements with the majority opinion rested on a variety of grounds. In the longest, Justice Byron White accused his colleagues of overreaching, writing that "the Court, in a few printed pages, has federalized major aspects of libel law by declaring unconstitutional in important respects the prevailing defamation law in all or most of the 50 States." He also stated that "there are wholly insufficient grounds for scuttling the libel laws of the States in such wholesale fashion, to say nothing of deprecating the reputation interest of ordinary citizens and rendering them powerless to protect themselves... It is an ill-considered exercise of the power entrusted to this Court."

Justice William O. Douglas, on the other hand, felt that libel laws were too strict as it was, and that leaving liability standards for private figures up to the states was too capricious: "This of course leaves the simple negligence standard as an option with the jury free to impose damages upon a finding that the publisher failed to act as 'a reasonable man.' With such continued erosion of First Amendment protection, I fear that it may well be the reasonable man who refrains from speaking."

Justice William J. Brennan Jr. joined Douglas in fearing that the press in some states could be too easily restricted and practice self-censorship in reporting on public affairs as a result.

Justice Warren E. Burger's short dissent expressed worry that the decision might make it less likely that lawyers would be willing to take the cases of unpopular clients.

== Aftermath and legacy ==
Gertz won the retrial at district court, which awarded him $400,000 (equivalent to $2,610,000 in 2025) (including $300,000 (equivalent to $1,960,000 in 2025) in punitive damages) in damages. The verdict was sustained on appeal, and the case finally ended when the Supreme Court denied the John Birch Society certiorari in 1983. Gertz, a prominent civil libertarian, said that the jury verdict had not only vindicated him "but struck a blow for responsible journalism."

Since the majority opinion emphatically stated that there was "no such thing as a false idea," observers and libel law experts expected the Court to define an opinion privilege against libel the next time an appropriate case came up. However, Milkovich v. Lorain Journal Co. (1990) explicitly rejected the idea, saying that existing protections the Court had recognized were sufficient to meet the requirements of the First Amendment. Today, the privilege only exists in New York, where state courts have ruled that all statements of opinion are protected as long as they do not allege illegal conduct.

== See also ==
- List of United States Supreme Court cases, volume 418
