= The Entry =

1789 political cartoon

The Entry is a 1789 cartoon that depicted George Washington riding a donkey into New York. It was first distributed during the time of Washington's inauguration as the first president of the United States. Many accounts say it was "hawked on the streets of the capitol". No copies of this work have been found since at least 1933.

== Background ==
On April 14, 1789, Washington received official notification that he had been unanimously selected by the electoral college to be the first president of the United States. Washington set off from Mount Vernon to the U.S. capital in New York City on the morning of April 16. Washington passed through Alexandria, Virginia; Georgetown, Maryland (in present-day Washington D.C.); Baltimore; Grays Ferry, Philadelphia; and Trenton, New Jersey, before arriving in New York on April 23.

The first inauguration of George Washington took place on April 30, 1789, on the balcony of Federal Hall in New York City.

== Records of the cartoon ==
On the seventh of April, John Armstrong, Sr. wrote to Horatio Gates regarding the lavish preparations in New York City, saying

Yet in the midst of this admiration, there are skeptics who doubt its propriety, and wits who amuse themselves at its extravagance. The first will grumble and the last will laugh, and the President should be prepared to meet the attacks of both with firmness and good nature. A caricature has already appeared called 'The Entry,' full of very disloyal and profane allusions. It represents the General mounted on an ass, and in the arms of his man Billy — Humphreys leading the Jack, and chanting hosannas and birthday odes. The following couplet proceeds from the mouth of the devil:

The glorious time has come to pass
When David shall conduct an ass.

Referring to the same letter, James Parton in Caricature and other comic art in all times and many lands (1877) refers to the couplet above as "one couplet of which was legible", and remarks that "This effort was more ill-natured than brilliant".

In Our Country, also published in 1877, Benson J. Lossing provided the following graphic description of the known couplet within the cartoon:

The Devil appeared prominent, and from his mouth issued the words

On 8 March 1896, The New York Times described it as:

It represented the President riding on an ass which his aid, Col. David Humphrey, was leading. Out of the latter's mouth this hosanna was issuing: "The glorious time has come to pass / When David shall conduct an ass".

Another record of The Entry is found in the two-volume work A history of American graphic humor, 1747-1938 (1933), by English-born American art historian William Murrell and published by the Whitney Museum of American Art. In the index, he records it as "satire, published in 1789" and provides this description:

On this side of the Atlantic we have record, in a letter from an old Tory to a friend, of a cartoon depicting Washington on a throne and George III on bended knees before him. This was about 1778 or 1780. There seems to be no copy of [anywhere] of the one entitled The Entry representing Washington riding upon an ass, supported by his man-servant, and led by Col. David Humphreys, singing doggerel verses. A fair sample of the derisive nature of the whole may be gathered from the couplet which has been preserved:

The glorious time has come to pass
When David shall conduct an ass.

One thesis says that it "appeared in early April 1789, probably over or directly after the Palm Sunday weekend."

One modern account describes Humphreys in the cartoon as "laying palm branches" before Washington.

== The cartoon in modern times ==
In Falwell v. Flynt, 805 F.2d 484, 487 (4th Cir. 1986), Judge Wilkinson wrote:

Despite his enormous popularity in 1789, George Washington was once depicted on a donkey led by his aide David Humphreys over the caption, "The glorious time has come to pass/When David shall conduct an ass." S. Hess & M. Kaplan, The ungentlemanly art: A history of American political cartoons 61 (1968).
