= McKeiver v. Pennsylvania =

- Supreme Court of the United States

Argued December 10, 1970 Decided June 21, 1971
- Full case name: McKeiver et al. v. Pennsylvania
- Citations: 403 U.S. 528 (more) 91 S. Ct. 1976; 29 L. Ed. 2d 647; 1971 U.S. LEXIS 26

Case history
- Prior: Terry Appeal, 438 Pa. 339, 265 A.2d 350 (1970); probable jurisdiction noted, 399 U.S. 925 (1970); In re Burrus, 275 N.C. 517, 169 S.E.2d 879 (1969); cert. granted, 397 U.S. 1036 (1970).

Holding
- A trial by jury is not constitutionally required in the adjudicative phase of a state juvenile court delinquency proceeding.

Court membership
- Chief Justice Warren E. Burger Associate Justices Hugo Black · William O. Douglas; John M. Harlan II · William J. Brennan Jr. Potter Stewart · Byron White; Thurgood Marshall · Harry Blackmun

Case opinions
- Plurality: Blackmun, joined by Burger, Stewart, White
- Concurrence: White
- Concurrence: Harlan (in the judgment)
- Concur/dissent: Brennan
- Dissent: Douglas, joined by Black, Marshall

McKeiver v. Pennsylvania, 403 U.S. 528 (1971), is a decision of the United States Supreme Court. The Court held that juveniles in juvenile criminal proceedings were not entitled to a jury trial under the Sixth or Fourteenth Amendments. The Court's plurality opinion left the precise reasoning for the decision unclear.

== Background ==
Joseph McKeiver and Edward Terry were teenagers charged with acts of robbery, theft, assault, and escape. Both were denied a request for a jury trial at the Juvenile Court of Philadelphia. A state Superior Court affirmed the order and, after combining their separate cases into one case, the Supreme Court of Pennsylvania affirmed the decision stating that there is no constitutional right to a jury trial for juveniles. In similar cases, the Court of Appeals and Supreme Court of North Carolina both affirmed the lower court's decision, finding no constitutional requirement for a jury trial for juvenile defendants.

== Decision of the U.S. Supreme Court ==
Although the right to a jury trial is not guaranteed by the U.S. Constitution in these cases states may, and some do, employ jury trials in juvenile proceedings if they wish to do so. Kansas is the first state in the U.S. to articulate that the right should be extended to juveniles under its state constitution.

== See also ==
- List of United States Supreme Court cases, volume 403
