= List of United States Supreme Court cases, volume 497 =

This is a list of all the United States Supreme Court cases from volume 497 of the United States Reports:

Case name	Citation	Date decided
Milkovich v. Lorain Journal Co.	497 U.S. 1	1990
Collins v. Youngblood	497 U.S. 37	1990
Rutan v. Republican Party	497 U.S. 62	1990
Maislin Industries, U.S., Inc. v. Primary Steel, Inc.	497 U.S. 116	1990
Portland Golf Club v. Commissioner	497 U.S. 154	1990
Illinois v. Rodriguez	497 U.S. 177	1990
Kansas v. UtiliCorp United Inc.	497 U.S. 199	1990
Sawyer v. Smith	497 U.S. 227	1990
Cruzan v. Director, Mo. Dept. of Health	497 U.S. 261	1990
Sisson v. Ruby	497 U.S. 358	1990
Georgia v. South Carolina	497 U.S. 376	1990
Hodgson v. Minnesota	497 U.S. 417	1990
Ohio v. Akron Center for Reproductive Health	497 U.S. 502	1990
Alvarado v. United States	497 U.S. 543	1990
Metro Broadcasting, Inc. v. FCC	497 U.S. 547	1990
Walton v. Arizona	497 U.S. 639	1990
United States v. Kokinda	497 U.S. 720	1990
Lewis v. Jeffers	497 U.S. 764	1990
Idaho v. Wright	497 U.S. 805	1990
Maryland v. Craig	497 U.S. 836	1990
Lujan v. National Wildlife Federation	497 U.S. 871	1990
Ashland Oil, Inc. v. Caryl	497 U.S. 916	1990
National Mines Corp. v. Caryl	497 U.S. 922	1990
