= New York Times Co. v. United States =

- Supreme Court of the United States

Argued June 26, 1971 Decided June 30, 1971
- Full case name: New York Times Company v. United States; United States v. The Washington Post Company et al.
- Citations: 403 U.S. 713 (more) 91 S. Ct. 2140; 29 L. Ed. 2d 822; 1971 U.S. LEXIS 100

Case history
- Prior: United States v. New York Times Co., 328 F. Supp. 324 (S.D.N.Y. 1971); United States v. New York Times Co., 444 F.2d 544 (2d Cir. 1971); United States v. Washington Post Co., 446 F.2d 1322, 1327 (D.C. Cir. 1971)

Holding
- To exercise prior restraint, the Government must show sufficient evidence that publication of the material would cause a "grave and irreparable" danger.

Court membership
- Chief Justice Warren E. Burger Associate Justices Hugo Black · William O. Douglas; John M. Harlan II · William J. Brennan Jr. Potter Stewart · Byron White; Thurgood Marshall · Harry Blackmun

Case opinions
- Per curiam
- Concurrence: Black, joined by Douglas
- Concurrence: Douglas, joined by Black
- Concurrence: Brennan
- Concurrence: Stewart, joined by White
- Concurrence: White, joined by Stewart
- Concurrence: Marshall
- Dissent: Burger
- Dissent: Harlan, joined by Burger, Blackmun
- Dissent: Blackmun

Laws applied
- U.S. Const. amend. I

New York Times Co. v. United States, 403 U.S. 713 (1971), often referred to as The Pentagon Papers Case, is a landmark decision of the Supreme Court of the United States on the First Amendment right to freedom of the press. The ruling made it possible for The New York Times and The Washington Post newspapers to publish the then-classified Pentagon Papers without risk of government censorship or punishment.

President Richard Nixon had claimed executive authority to force the Times to suspend publication of classified information in its possession. The question before the court was whether the constitutional freedom of the press, guaranteed by the First Amendment, was subordinate to a claimed need of the executive branch of government to maintain the secrecy of information. The Supreme Court ruled that the First Amendment did protect the right of The New York Times to print the materials.

== Background ==
The New York Times Washington Bureau Chief Max Frankel stated in 1971, during the organization's ongoing fight to publish the Pentagon Papers, that secrets are often leaked to the press as a means of "testing policy ideas and government initiatives." Frankel recounted, for example, that presidents John F. Kennedy and Lyndon B. Johnson revealed Cold War secrets for political and communication purposes. In contrast, the Pentagon Papers were released outside the unspoken rules of this framework by originating from a source at the lower levels of government. By 1971, the United States had been engaged in an undeclared war with North Vietnam for six years. At this point, about 58,000 American soldiers had died and the government was facing widespread dissent from large portions of the American public. In 1967, Secretary of Defense Robert S. McNamara commissioned a "massive top-secret history of the United States role in Indochina". Daniel Ellsberg, who had helped produce the report, allowed New York Times reporter Neil Sheehan to view 43 volumes of the 47-volume, 7,000-page report in Boston on March 2, 1971. Against Ellsberg's wishes, Sheehan secretly copied the volumes and flew them to The Jefferson hotel in Washington for an initial reading. He then mailed them to New York for final organization, and the Times began publishing articles outlining the findings.

=== Restraining order sought ===
The black article appeared in the Times' Sunday edition, on June 13, 1971. By the following Tuesday, the Times received an order to cease further publication from a District Court judge, at the request of the administration. The government claimed it would cause "irreparable injury to the defense interests of the United States" and wanted to "enjoin The New York Times and The Washington Post from publishing the contents of a classified study entitled History of U.S. Decision-Making Process on the Vietnam Policy."

The government sought a restraining order that prevented the Times from posting any further articles based upon the Pentagon Papers. In addition to The New York Times Company, the Justice Department named the following defendants: Arthur Ochs Sulzberger, president and publisher; Harding Bancroft and Ivan Veit, executive vice presidents; Francis Cox, James Goodale, Sydney Gruson, Walter Mattson, John McCabe, John H. Mortimer and James Reston, vice presidents; John B. Oakes, editorial page editor; A. M. Rosenthal, managing editor; Daniel Schwarz, Sunday editor; Clifton Daniel and Tom Wicker, associate editors; Gerald Gold and Allan M. Siegal, assistant foreign editors; Neil Sheehan, Hedrick Smith, E. W. Kenworthy and Fox Butterfield, reporters; and Samuel Abt, a foreign desk copy editor.

=== Section 793 of the Espionage Act ===
Section 793 of the Espionage Act was cited by Attorney General John N. Mitchell as cause for the United States to bar further publication of stories based upon the Pentagon Papers. The statute was spread over three pages of the United States Code Annotated and the only part that appeared to apply to the Times was 793(e), which made it criminal for:

Whoever having unauthorized possession of, access to, or control over any document, writing, code book, signal book, sketch, photograph, photographic negative, blueprint, plan, map, model, instrument, appliance, or note relating to the national defense, or information relating to the national defense which information the possessor has reason to believe could be used to the injury of the United States or to the advantage of any foreign nation, willfully communicates, delivers, transmits or causes to be communicated, delivered, or transmitted, or attempts to communicate, deliver, transmit or cause to be communicated, delivered, or transmitted the same to any person not entitled to receive it, or willfully retains the same and fails to deliver it to the officer or employee of the United States entitled to receive it [shall be fined under this title or imprisoned not more than ten years, or both].

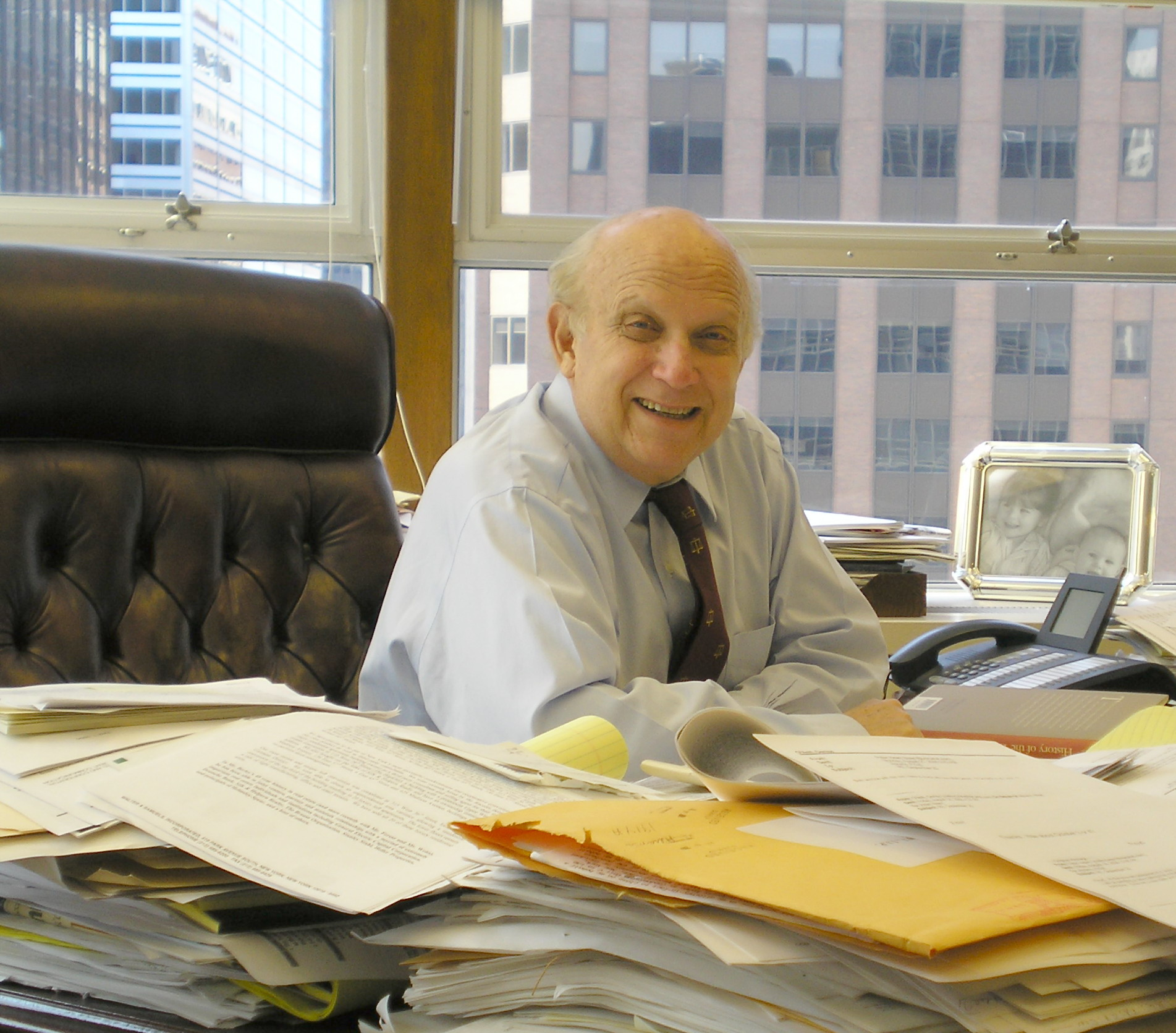
Floyd Abrams, counsel to The New York Times

Based on this language, Alexander Bickel and Floyd Abrams felt there were three preliminary arguments to raise. First, the wording of the statute was very broad. Was each article about foreign policy one "relating to the national defense"? What was the significance of "reason to believe" that the Pentagon Papers "could be used to the injury of the United States or the advantage of any foreign nation"? If the motivation was to educate the public, was that a defense that served to help, not hinder, the country? Would the public be "a person not entitled to receive" the information? Of equal importance was what the statute did not say: No references to "publication" (as Attorney General Mitchell's cease-and-desist order referenced), no reference to classified information, and no support for Mitchell's reliance on the top secret classification to justify restraint on publication. Additionally, there was no statutory language providing authority for prior restraint on publication at all.

A secondary issue was the relevance of Mitchell's reliance on a criminal statute in a civil proceeding seeking prior restraint. There was a Supreme Court precedent that lent support to the idea that bans on the publication of information by the press were unconstitutional. In 1907 Oliver Wendell Holmes wrote the "main purpose" of the First Amendment was "to prevent all such previous restraints upon publications as had been practiced by other governments." In 1931 the Court wrote that only the narrowest circumstances—such as publication of the dates of departure of ships during wartime—were permissibly restrained. In 1969 John Marshall Harlan II wrote that the Supreme Court "rejected all manner of prior restraint on publication." This second line of reasoning made it seem the statute should only be dealt with in passing, making the case a First Amendment one and the relief the government wanted—a bar on publication—unavailable.

The third possible approach was a very broad view of the First Amendment, one not focused on the impact of a government victory on the life of a democratic society if prior restraint were granted; but that the publication of just these sorts of materials—governmental misjudgments and misconducts of high import—is exactly why the First Amendment exists.

Federal judge Murray Gurfein heard arguments in the District Court for the Southern District of New York. Michael Hess, chief of the Civil Division of the United States Attorneys Office, argued "serious injuries are being inflicted on our foreign relations, to the benefit of other nations opposed to our foreign relations, to the benefit of other nations opposed to our form of government." Hess relied on Secretary of State William P. Rogers's statement reported earlier that day that a number of nations were concerned about the Papers publication and an affidavit from the general counsel of the Navy that alleged irreparable injury if publication did not cease. Hess asked for a temporary restraining order.

Bickel argued that the separation of powers barred the court from issuing the restraining order since there was no statute authorizing such relief. He further argued that there was no exception to the general unavailability of prior restraint that applied in this case. Gurfein called all counsel to his chambers and asked Bickel and Abrams to have the Times cease publication of the Papers until he could review them. Bickel responded that Gurfein would be the first judge in American history to enter a prior restraint enjoining the publication of news if he granted the government's request. The Times refused to cease publication. Gurfein granted the request and set a hearing for June 17th.

The New York Times agreed to abide by the restraining order and on June 19, Judge Gurfein rejected the administration's request for an injunction, writing that "[t]he security of the Nation is not at the ramparts alone. Security also lies in the value of our free institutions. A cantankerous press, an obstinate press, a ubiquitous press must be suffered by those in authority in order to preserve the even greater values of freedom of expression and the right of the people to know." However, the Court of Appeals, after an en banc hearing, granted an injunction until June 25.

=== United States v. Washington Post Co. ===
On June 18, 1971, The Washington Post began publishing its own series of articles based upon the Pentagon Papers. That same day, Assistant U.S. Attorney General William Rehnquist asked the Post to cease publication. After the paper refused, Rehnquist sought an injunction in the District Court for the District of Columbia, but Judge Gerhard Gesell rejected the government's request, as did the Court of Appeals for the DC Circuit. This led to an inconsistency between the D.C. Circuit and Second Circuit Courts of Appeals.

== Opinion ==
The Supreme Court heard arguments from the Executive Branch, the Times, the Post, and the Justice Department on June 25 and 26, 1971. Along with the issue of how the Times obtained the documents (which was being investigated by a federal grand jury elsewhere) the real issue for the Court was whether there was a sufficient justification for prior restraint, which would be a suspension of the newspaper's First Amendment rights to freedom of the press. The First Amendment states that no federal law can be made abridging the freedom of the press, but a few landmark cases in the 20th century had established precedents creating exceptions to that rule, among them the "clear and present danger" test first articulated by Justice Oliver Wendell Holmes Jr. in Schenck v. United States.

The most recent incarnation of the exception was the grave and probable danger rule, established in Dennis v. United States, 341 U.S. 494 (1951). During this case, the wording was changed to the grave and irreparable danger standard. The idea behind the numerous versions of the rule is that if a certain message will likely cause a "grave and irreparable" danger to the American public when expressed, then the message's prior restraint could be considered an acceptable infringement of civil liberties. The Supreme Court was therefore charged with determining if the Government had sufficiently met the "burden of showing justification for the imposition of such a restraint".

On June 30, with six Justices concurring and three dissenting, the Supreme Court upheld the right of the newspapers to publish the material. The Court issued a terse per curiam opinion, stating only that the Court concurred with the decisions of the two lower courts to reject the Government's request for an injunction. In its decision, the court first established the legal question with the use of precedents. It first stated that "Any system of prior restraints of expression comes to this Court bearing a heavy presumption against its constitutional validity". The purpose of this statement was to make clear the presence of the inherent conflict between the Government's efforts and the First Amendment. The decision then stated that the government "thus carries a heavy burden of showing justification for the imposition of such a restraint". This reinforced the idea that it was the Nixon Administration's responsibility to show sufficient evidence that the newspapers' actions would cause a "grave and irreparable" danger.

New York Times v. United States is generally considered a victory for an expansive reading of the First Amendment, but as the Supreme Court ruled on whether the government had made a successful case for prior restraint, its decision did not void the Espionage Act or give the press unlimited freedom to publish classified documents.

=== Concurring opinions ===
Justice Hugo Black wrote an opinion that elaborated on his view of the absolute superiority of the First Amendment:

[T]he injunction against The New York Times should have been vacated without oral argument when the cases were first presented... . [E]very moment's continuance of the injunctions ... amounts to a flagrant, indefensible, and continuing violation of the First Amendment. ... The press was to serve the governed, not the governors. The Government's power to censor the press was abolished so that the press would remain forever free to censure the Government. The press was protected so that it could bear the secrets of the government and inform the people. Only a free and unrestrained press can effectively expose deception in government. And paramount among the responsibilities of a free press is the duty to prevent any part of the government from deceiving the people and sending them off to distant lands to die of foreign fevers and foreign shot and shell. ... [W]e are asked to hold that ... the Executive Branch, the Congress, and the Judiciary can make laws ... abridging the freedom of the press in the name of 'national security.' ... To find that the President has 'inherent power' to halt the publication of news ... would wipe out the First Amendment and destroy the fundamental liberty and security of the very people the Government hopes to make 'secure.' ... The word 'security' is a broad, vague generality whose contours should not be invoked to abrogate the fundamental law embodied in the First Amendment. The guarding of military and diplomatic secrets at the expense of an informed representative government provides no real security... . The Framers of the First Amendment, fully aware of both the need to defend a new nation and the abuses of the English and Colonial governments, sought to give this new society strength and security by providing that freedom of speech, press, religion, and assembly should not be abridged.

Justice William O. Douglas concurred with Black, arguing that the need for a free press as a check on government prevents any governmental restraint on the press.

Justice William J. Brennan, Jr., wrote separately to explain that the publication of the documents did not qualify as one of the three exceptions to the freedom of expression established in Near v. Minnesota (1931).

Justices Potter Stewart and Byron R. White agreed that it is the responsibility of the Executive to ensure national security through the protection of its information. However, in areas of national defense and international affairs, the President possesses great constitutional independence that is virtually unchecked by the Legislative and Judicial branches. "In absence of governmental checks and balances", wrote Justice Stewart, "the only effective restraint upon executive policy and power in [these two areas] may lie in an enlightened citizenry – in an informed and critical public opinion which alone can here protect the values of democratic government".

Justice Thurgood Marshall argued that the term "national security" was too broad to legitimize prior restraint, and also argued that it is not the Court's job to create laws where the Congress had not spoken.

=== Dissenting opinions ===
Chief Justice Warren Burger, dissenting, argued that when "the imperative of a free and unfettered press comes into collision with another imperative, the effective functioning of a complex modern government, there should be a detailed study on the effects of these actions." He argued that in the haste of the proceedings, and given the size of the documents, the Court was unable to gather enough information to make a decision. He also argued that the Times should have discussed the possible societal repercussions with the Government prior to publication of the material. The Chief Justice did not argue that the Government had met the aforementioned standard, but rather that the decision should not have been made so hastily.

Justice John M. Harlan and Justice Harry A. Blackmun joined Burger in arguing the faults in the proceedings, and the lack of attention towards national security and the rights of the Executive.

== See also ==
- List of United States Supreme Court cases, volume 403
- Spiegel affair, a similar case in West Germany
- The Post, a 2017 historical drama film directed by Steven Spielberg about the Pentagon Papers
