= Hodgson v. Minnesota =

- Supreme Court of the United States

Argued November 29, 1989 Decided June 25, 1990
- Full case name: Jane Elizabeth Hodgson, et al. v. Minnesota, et al.
- Citations: 497 U.S. 417 (more) 110 S. Ct. 2926; 111 L. Ed. 2d 344; 1990 U.S. LEXIS 3303; 58 U.S.L.W. 4957

Case history
- Prior: Certiorari to the United States Court of Appeals for the Eighth Circuit

Holding
- With respect to the planned abortion of a juvenile: (1) It is unconstitutional to require a notification to both parents, whether or not both wanted to know or had taken responsibility for raising the child. (2) It is constitutional to require a notification to one parent if there is a possible judicial bypass when the young woman could maturely demonstrate that notification would be unwise. (3) It is constitutional to impose a 48-hour waiting period.

Court membership
- Chief Justice William Rehnquist Associate Justices William J. Brennan Jr. · Byron White; Thurgood Marshall · Harry Blackmun; John P. Stevens · Sandra Day O'Connor; Antonin Scalia · Anthony Kennedy

Case opinions
- Majority: Stevens (parts I, II, IV, VII), joined by Brennan, Marshall, Blackmun, O'Connor
- Concurrence: Stevens (part III), joined by Brennan
- Concurrence: Stevens (parts V, VI), joined by O'Connor
- Concurrence: O'Connor
- Concur/dissent: Marshall, joined by Brennan, Blackmun
- Concur/dissent: Scalia
- Concur/dissent: Kennedy, joined by Rehnquist, White, Scalia
- Dissent: Stevens (part VIII)

Laws applied
- U.S. Const. amend. XIV; Minn. Stat. §§ 144.343(2)-(7)
- Superseded by
- Dobbs v. Jackson Women's Health Organization (2022)

Hodgson v. Minnesota, 497 U.S. 417 (1990), was a United States Supreme Court abortion rights case that dealt with whether a state law may require notification of both parents before a minor can obtain an abortion. The law in question provided a judicial alternative.

== Background ==
The case concerned a Minnesota law. The law required notice to both parents of a minor before she could undergo an abortion; it also contained a judicial bypass provision designed to take effect only if a court found one to be necessary. Dr. Jane Hodgson, a Minneapolis gynecologist, challenged the law. The Eighth Circuit had ruled that the law would be unconstitutional without a judicial bypass, but that the bypass provision saved it.

== Opinion of the Court ==
While Justice Stevens delivered a majority opinion for one of the holdings, there were five votes for each of two holdings, with Justice O'Connor proving as the decisive vote for each. Justices Stevens, Brennan, Marshall, Blackmun and O'Connor formed a majority holding that the two-parent notice requirement by itself was unconstitutional. Justice O'Connor believed that the two-parent requirement entailed risk to a pregnant teenager; she also argued that the rule failed to meet even the lowest standard of judicial review, a rationality standard. She joined the Court's more conservative Justices (Chief Justice Rehnquist and Justices White, Scalia and Kennedy), to form a majority for the law being valid with the judicial bypass; Justice Kennedy had pointed out the usefulness of the bypass procedure, as judges granted all but a handful of requests to authorize abortions without parental notice.

The ruling struck down the two-parent notification requirement, the majority citing an APA brief asserting that one-parent families are common in that state and that within the state, a minor often only needs one parent's permission for certain health needs; the rest of the statute, though, was voted constitutional because of its allowance for judicial bypass.

This case involved the first restriction on abortion that Justice O'Connor voted to strike down.

== See also ==
- List of United States Supreme Court cases, volume 497
- List of United States Supreme Court cases
- Lists of United States Supreme Court cases by volume
- List of United States Supreme Court cases by the Rehnquist Court
