= New York Times Co. v. Sullivan =

The New York Times Co. v. Sullivan
- Supreme Court of the United States

Argued January 6, 1964 Decided March 9, 1964
- Full case name: The New York Times Company v. L. B. Sullivan; Ralph D. Albernathy, et al. v. L. B. Sullivan
- Citations: 376 U.S. 254 (more) 84 S. Ct. 710; 11 L. Ed. 2d 686; 1964 U.S. LEXIS 1655; 95 A.L.R.2d 1412; 1 Media L. Rep. 1527
- Argument: Oral argument
- Reargument: Reargument

Case history
- Prior: Judgment for plaintiff, Circuit Court, Montgomery County, Alabama; motion for new trial denied, Circuit Court, Montgomery County; affirmed, 144 So. 2d 25 (Ala. 1962); cert. granted, 371 U.S. 946 (1963).

Holding
- A newspaper cannot be held liable for making false defamatory statements about the official conduct of a public official unless the statements were made with actual malice.

Court membership
- Chief Justice Earl Warren Associate Justices Hugo Black · William O. Douglas; Tom C. Clark · John M. Harlan II; William J. Brennan Jr. · Potter Stewart; Byron White · Arthur Goldberg

Case opinions
- Majority: Brennan, joined by Warren, Clark, Harlan, Stewart, White
- Concurrence: Black, joined by Douglas
- Concurrence: Goldberg (in result), joined by Douglas

Laws applied
- U.S. Const. amends. I, XIV

New York Times Co. v. Sullivan, 376 U.S. 254 (1964), is a landmark decision by the United States Supreme Court holding that the freedom of speech protections in the First Amendment to the U.S. Constitution limit the ability of public officials to sue for defamation. The decision held that if a plaintiff in a defamation lawsuit is a public official or candidate for public office, then not only must they prove the normal elements of defamation—publication of a false defamatory statement to a third party—they must also prove that the statement was made with "actual malice", meaning the defendant either knew the statement was false or recklessly disregarded whether it might be false.

The case began in 1960, when The New York Times published a full-page advertisement by supporters of Martin Luther King Jr. that criticized the police in Montgomery, Alabama, for their treatment of civil rights movement protesters. The ad had several factual errors regarding the number of times King had been arrested during the protests, what song the protesters had sung, and whether students had been expelled for participating. Based on the inaccuracies, Montgomery police commissioner L. B. Sullivan sued the Times for defamation in the local Alabama county court. After the judge ruled that the advertisement's inaccuracies were defamatory per se, the jury returned a verdict in favor of Sullivan and awarded him $500,000 in damages. The Times appealed first to the Supreme Court of Alabama, which affirmed the verdict, and then to the U.S. Supreme Court.

In March 1964, the Supreme Court unanimously held that the Alabama court's verdict violated the First Amendment. The Court reasoned that defending the principle of wide-open debate will inevitably include "vehement, caustic, and... unpleasantly sharp attacks on government and public officials." The Supreme Court's decision, and its adoption of the actual malice standard for defamation cases by public officials, reduced the financial exposure from potential defamation claims and frustrated efforts by public officials to use these claims to suppress political criticism. The Supreme Court has since extended Sullivan's higher legal standard for defamation to all "public figures". This has made it extremely difficult for a public figure to win a defamation lawsuit in the United States.

== Background ==
On March 29, 1960, The New York Times carried a full-page advertisement titled "Heed Their Rising Voices", paid for by the Committee to Defend Martin Luther King and the Struggle for Freedom in the South. In the advertisement, the Committee solicited funds to defend Martin Luther King Jr. against an Alabama perjury indictment. The advertisement described actions against civil rights protesters, some inaccurately and some of which involved the police force of Montgomery, Alabama. Referring to Alabama "official authority and police power", the advertisement stated: "They have arrested [King] seven times. ... ", though he had been arrested four times; and that "truckloads of police ... ringed the Alabama State College Campus" after the demonstration at the State Capitol, though the police had been "deployed near" the campus but had not actually "ringed" it and had not gone there in connection with the State Capitol demonstration. Although Montgomery Public Safety commissioner L. B. Sullivan was not named in the advertisement, he argued that the inaccurate criticism of actions by the police was defamatory to him as well because it was his duty to supervise the police department.

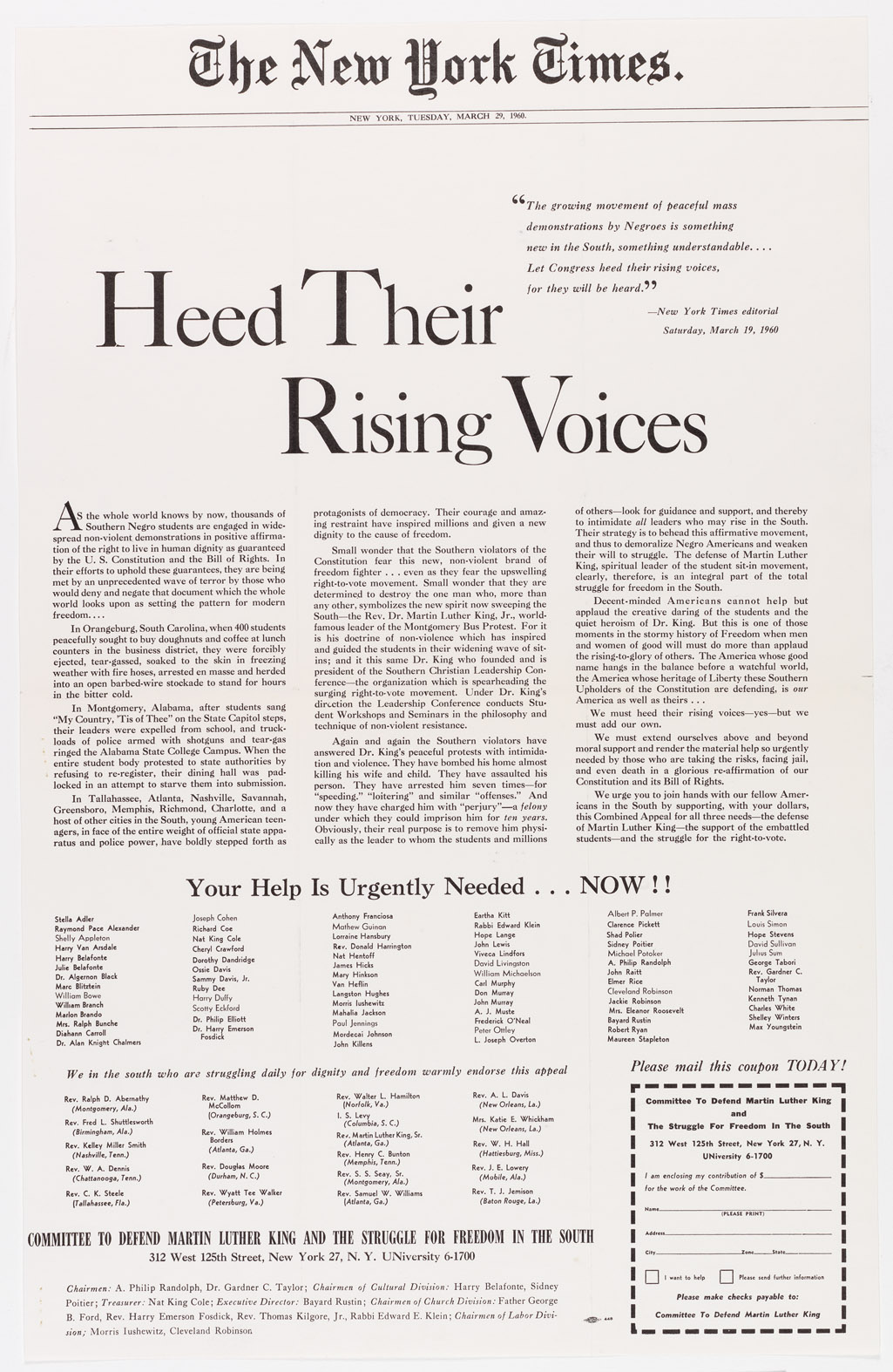
The advertisement published in The New York Times on March 29, 1960, that led to Sullivan's defamation lawsuit

Because Alabama law denied public officers recovery of punitive damages in a libel action on their official conduct unless they first made a written demand for a public retraction and the defendant failed or refused to comply, Sullivan sent such a request. The Times did not publish a retraction in response to the demand. Instead, its lawyers wrote a letter stating that "we ... are somewhat puzzled as to how you think the statements in any way reflect on you," and "you might, if you desire, let us know in what respect you claim that the statements in the advertisement reflect on you." Sullivan did not respond and filed a libel suit a few days later. He also sued four African-American ministers mentioned in the ad: Ralph Abernathy, S.S. Seay Sr., Fred Shuttlesworth, and Joseph Lowery.

The Times subsequently published a retraction of the advertisement upon the demand of Governor John Patterson of Alabama, who alleged the publication charged him with "grave misconduct and ... improper actions and omissions as Governor of Alabama and ex officio chairman of the State Board of Education of Alabama." When asked to explain why there had been a retraction for the Governor but not for Sullivan, the Secretary of the Times testified:

We did that because we didn't want anything that was published by the Times to be a reflection on the State of Alabama and the Governor was, as far as we could see, the embodiment of the State of Alabama and the proper representative of the state and we had by that time learned more of the facts which the ad purported to recite and, finally, the ad did refer to the action of the state authorities and the Board of Education presumably of which the Governor is the ex officio chairman ...

However, the Secretary also testified he did not think that "any of the languages in there referred to Mr. Sullivan."

The jury returned a verdict for Sullivan and awarded him $500,000 in damages (equivalent to $5,390,000 in 2025). The Alabama Supreme Court affirmed on August 30, 1962, saying that "the First Amendment of the U.S. Constitution does not protect libelous publications." The Times appealed to the United States Supreme Court.

Constitutional law scholar Herbert Wechsler successfully argued the case before the United States Supreme Court. Louis M. Loeb, a partner at the firm of Lord Day & Lord who served as chief counsel to the Times from 1948 to 1967, was among the authors of the brief of the Times.

== Decision ==
On March 9, 1964, the Supreme Court issued a unanimous 9–0 decision in favor of The New York Times that vacated the Alabama court's judgment and limited newspapers' liability for damages in defamation suits by public officials.

=== Opinion ===
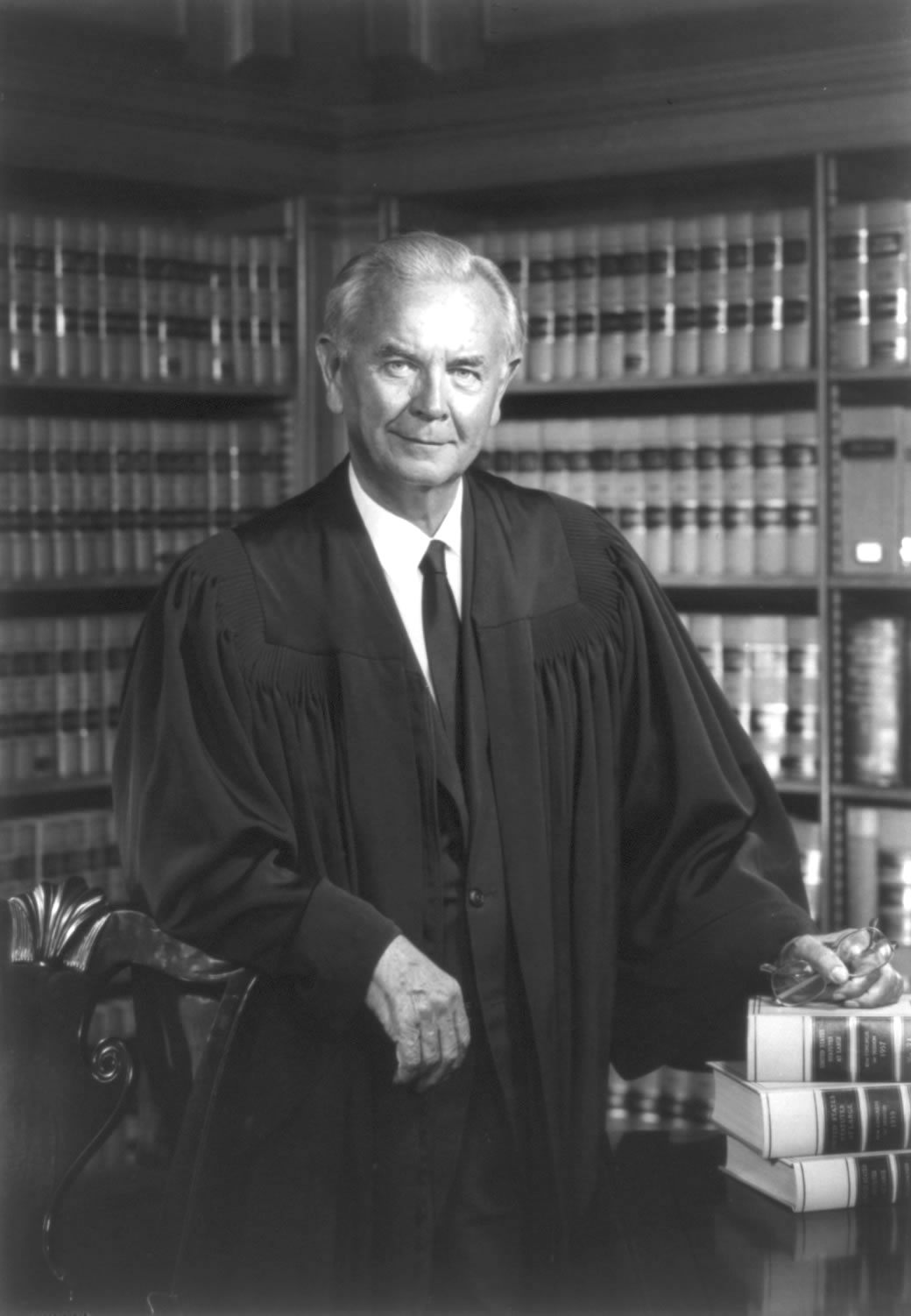
Justice William J. Brennan Jr., the author of the Supreme Court's opinion in New York Times v. Sullivan

Justice William J. Brennan Jr. authored the Court's opinion, joined by Chief Justice Earl Warren and Justices Tom C. Clark, John Marshall Harlan II, Potter Stewart, and Byron White. The Court began by explaining that the freedom to criticize public officials lay at the core of the freedom of speech and freedom of the press protected by the First Amendment.

The general proposition that freedom of expression upon public questions is secured by the First Amendment has long been settled by our decisions. The constitutional safeguard, we have said, "was fashioned to assure unfettered interchange of ideas for the bringing about of political and social changes desired by the people." ... "[I]t is a prized American privilege to speak one's mind, although not always with perfect taste, on all public institutions." ... The First Amendment, said Judge Learned Hand, "presupposes that right conclusions are more likely to be gathered out of a multitude of tongues, than through any kind of authoritative selection. To many, this is, and always will be, folly; but we have staked upon it our all."

— Sullivan, 376 U.S. at 269–70 (citations omitted).

The Court therefore concluded that it had to consider Sullivan's defamation claims "against the background of a profound national commitment to the principle that debate on public issues should be uninhibited, robust, and wide-open, and that it may well include vehement, caustic, and sometimes unpleasantly sharp attacks on government and public officials."

With this background, the Court framed the case as turning on whether the United States' constitutional commitment to free speech required loosening the traditional common law rules for defamation.

The present advertisement, as an expression of grievance and protest on one of the major public issues of our time, would seem clearly to qualify for the constitutional protection. The question is whether it forfeits that protection by the falsity of some of its factual statements and by its alleged defamation of respondent.

— Sullivan, 376 U.S. at 271.

In answer, the Court held that the First Amendment requires limiting the traditional common-law rules of defamation when a public official sues over false statements concerning his or her official conduct. The Court reasoned that "erroneous statement is inevitable in free debate, and ... must be protected if the freedoms of expression are to have the breathing space that they need ... to survive." It concluded that the importance of safeguarding the "breathing space" created by the First Amendment required giving constitutional protection to "erroneous statements honestly made". The Court analogized Alabama's libel law to the infamous Alien and Sedition Acts passed in the 1790s during the presidency of John Adams. It reasoned that a broad interpretation of libel laws that protected government officials from criticism would produce situations similar to those under the Alien and Sedition Acts, which had been historically criticized.

Because of the importance of free debate about public officials, the Court held that it was not enough that Alabama's libel law, like most libel laws in the English common law tradition, allowed defendants to use the truth of their defamatory statements as a defense. Instead, the Court held that under U.S. law, any public official suing for defamation must prove that the defendant made the defamatory statement with "actual malice".

The constitutional guarantees require, we think, a federal rule that prohibits a public official from recovering damages for a defamatory falsehood relating to his official conduct unless he proves that the statement was made with "actual malice" — that is, with knowledge that it was false or with reckless disregard of whether it was false or not.

— Sullivan, 376 U.S. at 279–80.

The Court said that besides proving "actual malice", the First Amendment's protections also imposed two other limitations on libel laws. First, a public official seeking damages must prove that the defendant's defamatory statement was about the official individually, not about government policy generally. Second, unlike in traditional common law defamation lawsuits where the defendant had the burden to prove that his or her statement was true, in defamation suits involving American public officials the officials must prove that the defendant's statement was false.

=== Concurrences ===
Justices Hugo Black wrote a concurring opinion joined by Justice William O. Douglas. Justice Arthur Goldberg wrote a concurrence in the judgment also joined by Douglas.

== International comparisons ==
The rule that somebody alleging defamation may have to prove untruth, rather than that the defendant should have to prove the truth of a statement, was a departure from English common law. The change was specifically rejected by England in Derbyshire County Council v Times Newspapers Ltd (1993) and Canada in Hill v Church of Scientology of Toronto (1995) and Grant v Torstar Corp (2009). In Australia, the outcome of Sullivan was followed in Theophanous v Herald & Weekly Times Ltd (1994), which was overruled by the High Court of Australia in Lange v Australian Broadcasting Corporation (1997).

== 50th anniversary ==
In 2014, on the 50th anniversary of New York Times v. Sullivan, The New York Times released an editorial in which it stated the background of the case, laid out the rationale for the Supreme Court decision, critically reflected on the state of freedom of the press 50 years after the ruling and compared the state of freedom of the press in the United States with other nations. The editorial board of The New York Times heralded Sullivan not only as a ruling which "instantly changed libel law in the United States", but also as "the clearest and most forceful defense of press freedom in American history." The board added:

The ruling was revolutionary because the court for the first time rejected virtually any attempt to squelch criticism of public officials—even if false—as antithetical to "the central meaning of the First Amendment." Today, our understanding of freedom of the press comes in large part from the Sullivan case. Its core observations and principles remain unchallenged, even as the Internet has turned everyone into a worldwide publisher—capable of calling public officials instantly to account for their actions and also of ruining reputations with the click of a mouse.

In a 2015 Time magazine survey of over 50 law professors, Owen M. Fiss at Yale Law School and Steven Shiffrin at Cornell Law School named New York Times v. Sullivan the best Supreme Court decision since 1960, with Fiss saying that the decision helped cement "the free-speech traditions that have ensured the vibrancy of American democracy" and Schiffrin stating that the case "overturned the censorial aspects of the law of libel and made it far easier in what’s left of our democracy for citizens—including the Fourth Estate—to criticize the powerful."

== Later developments ==
- Curtis Publishing Co. v. Butts, 388 U.S. 130 (1967): Public figures who are not public officials may still sue news organizations if they disseminate information about them which is recklessly gathered and unchecked.
- Gertz v. Robert Welch, Inc., 418 U.S. 323 (1974): Actual malice is not necessary for defamation of a private person if negligence is present.
- Time, Inc. v. Hill, 385 U.S. 374 (1967). The actual malice standard extends to a false light invasion of privacy tort.
- Hustler Magazine v. Falwell, 485 U.S. 46 (1988): The actual malice standard extends to intentional infliction of emotional distress.
- Milkovich v. Lorain Journal Co., 497 U.S. 1 (1990): Existing law is sufficient to protect free speech without recognizing an opinion privilege against libel claims.

== Subsequent developments and legacy ==
The potential for reconsideration of Sullivan has been raised from the late 2000s to the early 2020s. In 2008, Rod Nachman, who had represented Sullivan before the Supreme Court, said that Sullivan and its progeny "have discouraged good people from running for office. The courts may have gone a little bit far for the First Amendment." Leading into and during his first presidency from 2016 to 2020, Donald Trump called for changes in libel laws, taking issue with reporting from The New York Times and the content of Bob Woodward's book Fear: Trump in the White House in 2018.

Trump's view has been seconded by United States Supreme Court Justice Clarence Thomas in several opinions. Thomas advocated reevaluating Sullivan in an opinion attached to the court's 2019 denial to hear a libel case brought by Katherine McKee, one of the women that accused entertainer Bill Cosby of sexual assault. McKee claimed that Cosby had leaked a letter that permanently damaged her reputation. Lower courts rejected her case based on Sullivan, stating that she "thrust herself to the forefront of a public controversy", making her a limited public figure and requiring the higher standard of malice to be demonstrated. While Thomas wrote that the Court's decision to deny McKee's petition based on Sullivan was correct, he added that he believed Sullivan was wrongly decided and stated that "if the Constitution does not require public figures to satisfy an actual-malice standard in state-law defamation suits, then neither should we." He also repeated calls to review Sullivan in his dissent in Berisha v. Lawson in 2021 and in his dissent to the court's denial to hear Don Blankenship's appeal, in the latter saying that Sullivan allows news agencies to "cast false aspersions on public figures with near impunity." Justice Neil Gorsuch also joined Thomas in Berisha in expressing his concerns regarding how the media landscape had changed since Sullivan.

Court of Appeals for the District of Columbia Circuit judge Laurence Silberman called on the Supreme Court to overturn Sullivan in a March 2021 dissent, stating that The New York Times and The Washington Post were "virtually Democratic Party broadsheets". He also accused Big Tech companies of censoring conservatives and warned that "Democratic Party ideological control" of mainstream media could be a prelude to an "authoritarian or dictatorial regime" that would constitute "a threat to a viable democracy".

Las Vegas casino owner Steve Wynn filed defamation lawsuits against the Associated Press in 2018, claiming that articles published by the agency that contained allegations related to Wynn and sexual assault in the 1970s. Wynn argued that the Associated Press had met the standard of actual malice in its reporting. The Nevada courts dismissed Wynn's suit, arguing he had failed to show actual malice. Wynn subsequently petitioned the Supreme Court to hear his case in February 2025, asking them to overturn the actual malice standard. The Supreme Court declined to grant certiorari to Wynn's case in March 2025.

On March 19, 2023, The New York Times published a story reviewing the original advertisement and the subsequent legal case.

The Supreme Court declined to hear Alan Dershowitz's appeal in his defamation case against CNN in an unsigned order in June 2026. Justice Thomas wrote a dissent, joined by Justice Gorsuch, claiming that the actual malice standard set by Sullivan was inconsistent with the First Amendment.

== See also ==
- New York Times Co. v. United States (1971)
- New York Times Co. v. Tasini (2001)
- List of United States Supreme Court cases, volume 376
- Rod Nachman
