= Jane Elizabeth Hodgson =

American physician, obstetrician, and gynecologist (1915–2006)

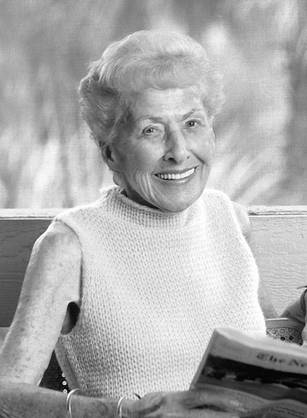
- Born: January 23, 1915; Crookston, Minnesota
- Died: October 23, 2006 (aged 91); Rochester, Minnesota
- Occupations: Physician, obstetrician, gynecologist
- Spouse: Frank W. Quattlebaum

Jane Elizabeth Hodgson (January 23, 1915, Crookston, Minnesota – October 23, 2006, Rochester, Minnesota) was an American obstetrician and gynecologist. Hodgson received a bachelor's degree from Carleton College and her M.D. from the University of Minnesota. She trained at the Jersey City Medical Center and at the Mayo Clinic.

Hodgson's 50-year career focused on providing reproductive health care to women, including abortions. She opened her own clinic in St Paul, Minnesota and co-founded the Duluth WE Health Clinic (formerly Women's Health Center). In addition to providing medical care to women, Hodgson was also an advocate for women's rights, challenging state laws that restricted access to abortion. She is the only person ever convicted in the United States of performing an abortion in a hospital.

== Education and career ==
Hodgson received a bachelor's degree in chemistry from Carleton College in 1934 and her medical degree from the University of Minnesota in 1939. Hodgson met her future husband, Frank W. Quattlebaum, when they were both interns in Jersey City, New Jersey. Together they completed their medical training at the Mayo Clinic in Rochester, Minnesota. They both gave time and talent to Project Hope, serving in Tanzania, Peru, Ecuador, Egypt, Grenada, and China. Hodgson eventually opened her own clinic in St Paul, Minnesota in 1947, and for the next 50 years provided reproductive health care to women. Her early research included pregnancy-testing methods and in 1952 she became a Founding Fellow of American College of Obstetricians and Gynecologists. In 1981 Hodgson co-founded the Duluth Women's Health Center.

Hodgson's opinion of abortion was influenced by both the women she cared for in her own practice, and by those she met on her many trips she took with her husband to the third world during the 1950s. She later told an interviewer: "My position on abortion evolved. I had been taught that abortion was immoral. I gradually came to change, I came to feel that the law was immoral, there were all these young women whose health was being ruined, whose lives were being ruined, whose plans had to be changed. From my point of view, it was poor medicine, it was poor public health policy." She was, however, optimistic about the future: Pulitzer Prize winner Linda Greenhouse cited an article in the Mayo Clinic alumni magazine in which Hodgson predicted: "Someday, abortion will be a humane medical service, not a felony." Hodgson summarized her opinion of the medical profession and abortion in a letter to the editor of The Journal of the American Medical Association: "Lest we forget—legal, competent, medical professionals are all that stand between safe health care for women and the dark days of the back-alleys. We in medicine have a moral obligation to provide that health care."

=== Awards and honors ===
Hodgson's advocacy for, and contributions to, the field of women's health earned her the National Abortion Federation's Christopher Tietze Humanitarian Award in 1981, the Planned Parenthood Federation of America's Margaret Sanger Award in 1995, and the American Medical Women's Association's National Reproductive Health Award in 1994. She was one of the first physicians to be inducted into the International Women in Medicine Hall of Fame in 2001.

== Abortion court cases ==
In 1970, Hodgson performed an abortion on a 23-year-old married mother of three children who had contracted rubella, which can cause serious birth defects in the fetus and child. The abortion, a dilation and curettage (D&C), was performed at the St. Paul-Ramsey Hospital (now called Regions Hospital). At the time, abortion was illegal in Minnesota, unless the pregnancy was a threat to the woman's health. Hodgson was charged, pled guilty and was sentenced to 30 days in jail. This was the first time that a licensed physician had been convicted for performing a therapeutic abortion in a hospital. She appealed to the state supreme court, which overturned her conviction after the pivotal Roe v. Wade decision by the United States Supreme Court. In response to her lawyer's question during her trial, "Do you regard the fertilized ovum as equivalent to a human person?" Hodgson replied, "No, and most women would not. We are more pragmatic than men, more concerned with reality. I'm concerned with the sacredness of life, but this is only a few embryonic cells." She continued, "We, as physicians, should be concerned with the quality of life as it develops."

In 1981, Hodgson lent her name to a suit (Hodgson v. Minnesota) brought by Planned Parenthood against Minnesota, challenging that state's law requiring that both parents be notified at least 48 hours before a minor has an abortion. When the case was heard in District Court, Hodgson testified that "...one 14-year-old patient, in order to keep her pregnancy private, tried to induce an abortion with the help of her friends by inserting a metallic object into her vagina, thereby tearing her body, scarring her cervix, and causing bleeding. When that attempt failed to induce an abortion, the patient, then four or five months pregnant, finally went to an abortion clinic. Because of the damage to the patient's cervix, doctors had to perform a hysterotomy..." The United States Supreme Court upheld that law in 1990, in part because the law included a 'judicial bypass', allowing a judge to permit the abortion without parental notification. In most cases, judges permit the abortions.

Hodgson was in court again in 1993 as a co-plaintiff in a case in which the judge struck down Minnesota's ban on Medicaid payments for abortions. Hodgson testified or provided research assistance for many cases including Sabot v Fargo Women's Health Organization, Women of the State of Minnesota v Natalie Haas Steffen, and Women's National Abortion Action Coalition (WONAAC) v Washington. Dr. Hodgson was committed to advocating for women's health rights, in 1989 Hodgson states "if at any time I've ever had any doubt about what I'm doing, all I have to do is see a patient, and talk to her, and I realize it's the right thing."

=== Women's Health Movement ===
Starting in the 1960s the United States' abortion laws were under scrutiny as many of the laws only restricted abortions to cases when the mother's life was at risk. During this time doctors were calling for the liberalization of abortion laws. Soon after, in the late 1960s, feminists joined doctors in the fight and requested for "abortions on demand." In 1969, a group of twelve women met at a women's liberation conference in Boston, they talked about their own experiences with doctors and shared their self-knowledge. From their research, in 1970, came a 193-page course booklet entitled Women and Their Bodies that included topics such as childbirth, birth control and venereal disease. This was the beginning of the Women's Health Movement.

Hodgson's actions were part of the Women's Health Movement. The year after Hodgson performed the abortion Women and Their Bodies was revised and retitled as Our Bodies, Ourselves as a way to emphasize this new movement of women demanding for knowledge about their bodies and more control over their healthcare.

== Works ==
=== Books and book chapters ===
- Hodgson, Jane E (1981). Abortion and sterilization: medical and social aspects. Boston: Academic Press. ISBN 978-0-8089-1344-3.
- Hodgson, JE (1998). "The Twentieth-Century Gender Battle: Difficulties in Perception". In Solinger, Rickie (ed.). Abortion Wars: A Half Century of Struggle, 1950-2000. Berkeley: University of California Press. pp. 290–306. ISBN 978-0-520-20256-6.

=== Journal articles ===
- Hodgson JE, Taguchi R (1950). "The Rana pipiens frog test for pregnancy". Minnesota Medicine. 33 (12): 1208–10. PMID 14796512.
- Quattlebaum FW, Hodgson JE (1952). "The surgical treatment of varicose veins in pregnancy". Surgery, Gynecology & Obstetrics. 95 (3): 336–40. PMID 14950668.
- Hodgson JE (1953). "Office use of the frog test for pregnancy". The Journal of the American Medical Association. 153 (4): 271–4. doi:10.1001/jama.1953.02940210013005. PMID 13084385.
- Hodgson JE (1955). "Use of hyaluronidase in the frog test for pregnancy". Am. J. Clin. Pathol. 25 (9): 1096–8. doi:10.1093/ajcp/25.9_ts.1096. PMID 13248837.
- Hodgson JE (1958). "The use of the chromatin smear in gynecology". Minnesota Medicine. 41 (6): 381–5. PMID 13565852.
- Hodgson JE (1959). "Accurate pregnancy testing in tranquilized patients". The Journal of the American Medical Association. 170 (16): 1890–2. doi:10.1001/jama.1959.03010160006002. PMID 13672780.
- Quattlebaum FW, Hodgson JE (1966). "Vein stripping in pregnancy". Minnesota Medicine. 49 (2): 245–7. PMID 5902586.
- Hodgson JE (1970). "You may be right. Therapeutic abortion in medical perspective". Minnesota Medicine. 53 (7): 755 passim. PMID 5427685.
- Hodgson JE (1972). "Teenage mothers". Minnesota Medicine. 55 (1): 49. PMID 5009225.
- Hodgson JE, Portman KC (1973). "First trimester abortion". Minnesota Medicine. 56 (10): 887–92. PMID 4753925.
- Hodgson JE (1973). "Pregnancy termination and infectious diseases". Minnesota Medicine. 56 (8): 698–9. PMID 4733547.
- Hodgson JE (1973). "Complications of abortion". Am. J. Obstet. Gynecol. 117 (2): 293–4. doi:10.1016/0002-9378(73)90654-6. PMID 4728885.
- Hodgson JE (1973). "Community abortion services. The role of organized medicine". Minnesota Medicine. 56 (3): 239–42. PMID 4688366.
- Hodgson JE, Portmann KC (1974). "Complications of 10,453 consecutive first-trimester abortions: a prospective study". Am. J. Obstet. Gynecol. 120 (6): 802–7. doi:10.1016/0002-9378(74)90584-5. PMID 4429089.
- Hodgson JE, Smith R, Milstein D (1974). "Menstrual extraction. Putting it and all its synonyms into proper perspective as pseudonyms". The Journal of the American Medical Association. 228 (7): 849–50. doi:10.1001/jama.228.7.849. PMID 4406301.
- Hodgson JE, Major B, Portmann K, Quattlebaum FW (1975). "Prophylactic use of tetracycline for first trimester abortions". Obstetrics and Gynecology. 45 (5): 574–8. PMID 1124176.
- Hodgson JE (1975). "Major complications of 20,248 consecutive first trimester abortions: problems of fragmented care". Advances in Planned Parenthood. 9 (3–4): 52–9. PMID 1164997.
- Hodgson JE, Van Gorp PE (1976). "Induction of midtrimester abortion by the combined method of continuous extravovular infusion of prostaglandin F2alpha and intracervical laminaria tents". Fertil. Steril. 27 (12): 1359–65. doi:10.1016/S0015-0282(16)42249-1. PMID 1001520.
- Hodgson JE (1977). "A Reassessment of Menstrual Regulation". Studies in Family Planning. 8 (10). Studies in Family Planning, Vol. 8, No. 10: 263–7. doi:10.2307/1966017. JSTOR 1966017. PMID 412286.
- Hodgson JE, Ditmanson GM (1980). "Protocol for management of unsuccessful pregnancy". Minnesota Medicine. 63 (2): 134–8. PMID 7382975.
- Hodgson JE, Shi YF, Gao YL, Wu KJ, Jiang BY, Chen YL (1988). "Chlamydial infection in a Chinese gynecologic outpatient clinic". Obstetrics and Gynecology. 71 (1): 96–100. PMID 3275913.
- Hodgson JE (1995). "Violence versus reproductive health care". BMJ. 310 (6979): 547–8. doi:10.1136/bmj.310.6979.547. PMC 2548936. PMID 7888921.
- Hodgson JE (1996). "Physicians should relinquish reproductive control to patients". Minnesota Medicine. 79 (12): 6–7. PMID 8990842.
- Hodgson JE (1997). "Abortion procedures and abortifacients". Advances in Bioethics. 2: 75–106. PMID 12348331.
- Hodgson JE (1999). "The law, the AMA, and partial-birth abortion. American Medical Association". The Journal of the American Medical Association. 282 (1): 23–4, author reply 26–7. doi:10.1001/jama.282.1.23. PMID 10404900.
- Hodgson JE (2002). "Live Free or Die (review)". The Journal of the American Medical Association. 287 (9): 1188–1189. doi:10.1001/jama.287.9.1188.

== Additional resources ==
- The Jane E. Hodgson Papers, as well as records from the Minnesota Attorney General's office, are available for research use at the Minnesota Historical Society.
