= Actual malice =

US legal requirement for defamation

In United States defamation law, actual malice is a legal requirement imposed upon public officials or public figures when they file suit for libel (defamatory printed communications). Compared to other individuals who are less well known to the general public, public officials and public figures are held to a higher standard of proof to succeed in a defamation lawsuit.

== History ==
The Supreme Court adopted the actual malice standard in its landmark 1964 ruling in New York Times Co. v. Sullivan, in which the Warren Court held that:

The constitutional guarantees require, we think, a Federal rule that prohibits a public official from recovering damages for a defamatory falsehood relating to his official conduct unless he proves that the statement was made with 'actual malice'—that is, with knowledge that it was false or with reckless disregard of whether it was false or not.

Although defined within the context of a media defendant, the rule requiring proof of actual malice applies to all defendants including individuals. The standard can make it very difficult to prevail in a defamation case, even when allegations against a public figure are unfair or proven false.

Rather than being newly invented for the case, the term was used already in existing libel law. In many jurisdictions, proof of "actual malice" was required for punitive damages to be awarded or for other increased penalties. For example, Times v. Sullivan examined an existing Alabama statute that required proof of actual malice before an award of punitive damages would be permitted. Since proof of the writer's malicious intentions is hard to ascertain, proof that the writer knowingly published a falsehood was generally accepted as proof of malice (under the assumption that only a malicious person would knowingly publish a falsehood). In Sullivan, the Supreme Court adopted the term and gave it constitutional significance.

== Proof of malice ==
Actual malice is different from common law malice, a term indicating spite or ill will. It may also differ from malice as defined in state libel law, as reflected in the 1983 case of Carol Burnett v. National Enquirer, Inc., although states may not define a lower threshold for defamation claims than that required by the First Amendment.

Actual malice may be shown in many ways, as long as the claim is properly supported by admissible evidence. Malice may be proven through any competent evidence, either direct or circumstantial. All of the relevant circumstances surrounding the transaction may be shown, provided they are not too remote, including threats, other defamatory statements, subsequent statements made by the defendant, any circumstances that indicate the existence of rivalry, ill will, or hostility between the parties, and facts that tend to show a reckless disregard of the plaintiff's rights on the part of the defendant.

== See also ==
- Westmoreland v. CBS
- New York Times Co. v. Sullivan
