= Freedom of the press in the United States =

Press freedom protected by the First Amendment

Freedom of the press in the United States is legally protected by the First Amendment to the United States Constitution.

== History ==
=== Thirteen Colonies ===
In the Thirteen Colonies, before the signing of the Declaration of Independence, newspapers and works produced by printing presses were in general subject to a series of regulations. British authorities attempted to prohibit the publication and circulation of information of which they did not approve, and often levied charges of sedition and libel as a means of controlling printing presses.

One of the earliest cases concerning freedom of the press occurred in 1734. In a libel case against The New York Weekly Journal publisher John Peter Zenger by British governor William Cosby, Zenger was acquitted and the publication continued until 1751. At that time, there were only two newspapers in New York City and the second was not critical of Cosby's government.

=== U.S. Constitution ===
The First Amendment permits information, ideas and opinions without interference, constraint or prosecution by the government. It was adopted on December 15, 1791, as one of the ten amendments that constitute the Bill of Rights.

=== Early federal laws ===
In 1798, eleven years after adoption of the Constitution and seven years after ratification of the First Amendment, the governing Federalist Party attempted to stifle criticism with the Alien and Sedition Acts. According to the Sedition Act, making "false, scandalous and malicious" statements about Congress or the president (but not the vice-president) was a crime; Thomas Jefferson, a Democratic-Republican, was vice-president when the act was passed. These restrictions on the press were very unpopular, leading to the party's reduction to minority status after 1801, and eventual dissolution in 1824. Jefferson, who vehemently opposed the acts, was elected president in 1800 and pardoned most of those convicted under them. In his March 4, 1801, inaugural address, he reiterated his longstanding commitment to freedom of speech and of the press: "If there be any among us who would wish to dissolve this Union or to change its republican form, let them stand undisturbed as monuments of the safety with which error of opinion may be tolerated where reason is left free to combat it."

=== 19th century ===
In mid-August 1861, four New York City newspapers (the New York Daily News, The Journal of Commerce, the Day Book and the New York Freeman’s Journal) were given a presentment by a U.S. Circuit Court grand jury for "frequently encouraging the rebels by expressions of sympathy and agreement". This began a series of federal prosecutions during the Civil War of northern U.S. newspapers which expressed sympathy for Southern causes or criticized the Lincoln administration. Lists of "peace newspapers", published in protest by the New York Daily News, were used to plan retributions. The Bangor Democrat in Maine, was one of these newspapers; assailants believed part of a covert Federal raid destroyed the press and set the building ablaze. These actions followed executive orders issued by President Abraham Lincoln; his August 7, 1861, order made it illegal (punishable by death) to conduct "correspondence with" or give "intelligence to the enemy, either directly or indirectly".

=== 20th century ===
==== World War I ====
The Espionage Act of 1917 and the Sedition Act of 1918, which amended it, imposed restrictions on the press during wartime. The acts imposed a fine of $10,000 and up to 20 years' imprisonment for those publishing "... disloyal, profane, scurrilous, or abusive language about the form of government of the United States, or the Constitution of the United States, or the military or naval forces of the United States, or the flag ..." In Schenck v. United States (1919) the Supreme Court upheld the laws, setting the "clear and present danger" standard. Brandenburg v. Ohio (1969) revised the clear-and-present-danger test to the significantly less-restrictive "imminent lawless action" test.

==== Near v. Minnesota ====
The 1931 U.S. Supreme Court decision Near v. Minnesota recognized freedom of the press by roundly rejecting prior restraints on publication, a principle that applied to free speech generally in subsequent jurisprudence. The court ruled that a Minnesota law targeting publishers of malicious or scandalous newspapers violated the First Amendment (as applied through the Fourteenth Amendment).

==== Branzburg v. Hayes ====
Freedom of the press was described in 1972's Branzburg v. Hayes as "a fundamental personal right", not confined to newspapers and periodicals. In Lovell v. City of Griffin (1938), Chief Justice Charles Evans Hughes defined the press as "every sort of publication which affords a vehicle of information and opinion." This right has been extended to newspapers, books, plays, movies, and video games.

==== Associated Press v. United States ====
Associated Press v. United States (1945) dealt with media cooperation and consolidation. The court held that the AP violated the Sherman Antitrust Act by prohibiting the sale or proliferation of news to nonmember organizations and keeping nonmembers from joining; the AP bylaws constituted restraint of trade, and the fact that AP had not achieved a monopoly was irrelevant. The First Amendment did not excuse newspapers from the Sherman Antitrust Act. News, traded between states, counts as interstate commerce and is subject to the act. Freedom of the press from governmental interference under the First Amendment does not sanction repression of that freedom by private interests (326 U.S. 20). Justice Hugo Black wrote, "The First Amendment ... rests on the assumption that the widest possible dissemination of information from diverse and antagonistic sources is essential to the welfare of the public ... Freedom to publish is guaranteed by the Constitution, but freedom to combine to keep others from publishing is not".

==== New York Times Co. v. Sullivan ====
In New York Times Co. v. Sullivan (1964), the Supreme Court ruled that when a publication involves a public figure, to support a suit for libel the plaintiff bears the burden of proving that the publisher acted with actual malice: knew of the inaccuracy of the statement or acted with reckless disregard of its truth.

==== Greenbelt Cooperative Publishing Association, Inc. v. Bresler ====
In 1970, the U.S. Supreme Court ruled that a news organization couldn't be sued over the use of "rhetorical hyperbole". The usage in question was when quoting eyewitnesses, but the court ruled that, even if it hadn't, to call it libel "would subvert the most fundamental meaning of a free press".

==== New York Times Co. v. United States ====
In 1971, the Supreme Court upheld the publication of the Pentagon Papers.

==== Hazelwood v. Kuhlmeier ====
In Hazelwood v. Kuhlmeier (1988), the Supreme Court upheld the right of a school principal to review (and suppress) controversial articles in a school newspaper funded by the school and published in its name.

=== 21st century ===
Although it had been uncertain whether people who blog or use other social media are journalists entitled to protection by media shield laws, they are protected by the Free Speech and Free Press Clauses (neither of which differentiates between media businesses and nonprofessional speakers). This is further supported by the Supreme Court, which has refused to grant increased First Amendment protection to institutional media over other speakers; In a case involving campaign finance laws, the court rejected the "suggestion that communication by corporate members of the institutional press is entitled to greater constitutional protection than the same communication by" non-institutional-press businesses.

In United States v. Manning (2013), Chelsea Manning was found guilty of six counts of espionage for furnishing classified information to WikiLeaks.

==== Stop Online Piracy Act ====
On October 26, 2011, the Stop Online Piracy Act, which opponents said would threaten free speech and censor the Internet, was introduced to the U.S. House of Representatives. White House Press Secretary Jay Carney said that President Obama "[would] not support legislation that reduces freedom of expression." The bill was shelved in 2012 after widespread protests.

==== Obsidian Finance Group, LLC v. Cox ====
In 2014, blogger Crystal Cox accused Obsidian Finance Group and its co-founder Kevin D. Padrick of corrupt and fraudulent conduct. Although the court dismissed most of Cox's blog posts as opinion, it found one post to be more factual in its assertions (and, therefore, defamatory).

It was ruled for the first time, by the Court of Appeals for the Ninth Circuit, that a blogger is entitled to the same free speech protection as a journalist and cannot be liable for defamation unless the blogger acted negligently. In the decision, the court found journalists and bloggers to be equally protected under the First Amendment because the "protections of the First Amendment do not turn on whether the defendant was a trained journalist, formally affiliated with traditional news entities, engaged in conflict-of-interest disclosure, went beyond just assembling others' writings, or tried to get both sides of a story."

==== Donald Trump ====
===== Don Lemon's 2026 arrest and reactions =====
In January 2026, Don Lemon was live-streaming a protest against U.S. Immigration and Customs Enforcement (ICE) at the City Church in St. Paul, Minnesota. He was reportedly there as a reporter and there was no evidence that he was involved in the protest. A federal judge ruled that there was insufficient evidence to charge him. However, on January 29, 2026, Don Lemon was arrested by federal agents and released on January 30, 2026. The incident was met with mixed reactions.

===== Delaney Hall =====
The U.S. Press Freedom Tracker reported dozens of assaults by law enforcement against journalists covering the Delaney Hall protests between May 22 and May 31. In five incidents, journalists' equipment was damaged by law enforcement.

Journalists covering the protests have also been reported being turned away by police for carrying bags used to carry personal protective equipment (PPE) such as goggles, helmets, and gas masks used to protect from weapons such as tear gas, pepper spray, and rubber bullets. One journalist at the protests said said, "I think it’s incredibly dangerous to expect that journalists would put themselves in these situations without being able to protect themselves."

===== White House press ban =====
On September 18, 2026, President Donald Trump announced that he was banning CNN, MS NOW, and Politico from the White House, effective immediately. The following Monday, the three news outlets filed a lawsuit in the D.C. district court, seeking a temporary restraining order to lift the ban. The same day, the five members of the primary White House television pool - Fox, ABC, CBS, NBC, and CNN - issued a statement announcing that they were suspending coverage of the president.

== Ranking and polling of United States press freedom ==
2025 World Press Freedom Index Good: 85–100 points Satisfactory: 70–85 points Problematic: 55–70 points Difficult: 40–55 points Very serious <40 points Not classified

In 2026, the U.S. ranked 64th out of 180 countries in the Reporters Without Borders' Press Freedom Index. This is an overall measure of freedom available to the press, which includes a range of factors including government censorship, control over journalistic access, and whistleblower protections. This ranking fell from 20th in 2010 and 42nd in 2022.

Freedom House, a U.S.-based watchdog organization, ranked the United States 30th out of 197 countries in press freedom in 2014. Its report praised the constitutional protections given American journalists and criticized authorities for placing undue limits on investigative reporting in the name of national security. Freedom House gives countries a score out of 100, with 0 the most free and 100 the least free. The score is broken down into three separately-weighted categories: legal (out of 30), political (out of 40) and economic (out of 30). The United States scored 6, 10, and 5, respectively, that year for a cumulative score of 21.

In a Pew Research survey of 11,889 U.S. journalists conducted from February 16 to March 17, 2022, 57% stated that they were "extremely" or "very" concerned about the prospect of press restrictions being imposed in the United States.

== U.S. Press Freedom Tracker ==
U.S. Press Freedom Tracker
- Company type: Press freedom advocates
- Website type: Data gathering and reporting
- Founded: 2017
- Country of origin: United States
- Editors: Kirstin McCudden, Managing editor
- Industry: Journalism
- Website: pressfreedomtracker.us

The U.S. Press Freedom Tracker documents press freedom violations in the United States.

The tracker was founded in 2017 and was developed from funds donated by the Committee to Protect Journalists. It is led by the Freedom of the Press Foundation and a group of organizations. Its purpose is "to provide reliable, easy-to-access information on the number of press freedom violations in the United States – from journalists facing charges to reporters stopped at the U.S. border or asked to hand over their electronics."

The database is supported by a steering committee of Committee to Protect Journalists and twenty press freedom groups. It was developed to document the increasing rate of assaults, seizures of equipment, arrests, and stops at the border. It tracks the type of law enforcement—local, state, and the National Guard—and the nationality of the journalists. The tracker is maintained and findings are published by the Freedom of the Press Foundation.

== Violence against journalists in the U.S. ==
According to the U.S. Press Freedom Tracker, in 2020, approximately 300 journalists were assaulted in the U.S. (primarily by law enforcement) and at least 110 were arrested or criminally charged in relation to their reporting.

On September 3, 2022, investigative journalist Jeff German of the Las Vegas Review-Journal was stabbed to death outside his home. Police arrested Clark County Public Administrator Robert Telles on suspicion of murdering German for his reporting on Telles.

== See also ==
- Censorship in the United States
- Free Flow of Information Act
- Freedom of speech in the United States
- Government attacks on journalists in the United States
- Photography Is Not a Crime
- Reporter's privilege
- Timeline of government attacks on journalists in the United States

== Sources ==
- —— (July 1995). "Before Zenger: Truth and Seditious Speech in Colonial America, 1607–1700". The American Journal of Legal History. 39 (3). Oxford University Press: 337–358. doi:10.2307/845791. JSTOR 845791.
- Nelson, Harold L. (April 1959). "Seditious Libel in Colonial America". The American Journal of Legal History. 3 (2). Oxford University Press: 160–172. doi:10.2307/844283. JSTOR 844283.
- Thomas, Isaiah (1874). The history of printing in America, with a biography of printers. Vol. I. New York, B. Franklin.
- Wroth, Lawrence C. (1938). The Colonial Printer. Portland, Me., The Southworth-Anthoensen press.
