= James Goodale =

American lawyer

James C. Goodale
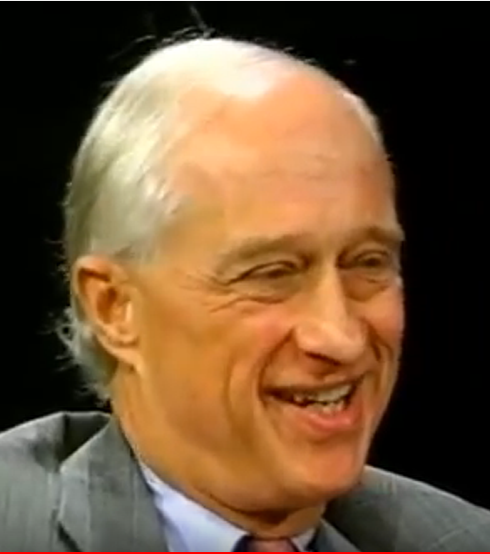
- .
- Born: July 27, 1933 (age 93); Cambridge, Massachusetts, U.S.
- Education: Yale University; University of Chicago Law School
- Occupations: Lawyer, TV Producer/Host, Author
- Employer: Debevoise & Plimpton
- Known for: Pentagon Papers; Reporter's Privilege

James C. Goodale (born July 27, 1933) was the vice president and general counsel for The New York Times and, later, the Times' vice chairman.

He is the author of Fighting for the Press: the Inside Story of the Pentagon Papers and Other Battles published by CUNY Journalism Press in 2013. The book was named twice as the best non-fiction book of 2013 by Alan Rusbridger, editor in chief of The Guardian, and Alan Clanton, editor of the online Thursday Review. The U.S. Court of Appeals for the Second Circuit cited "Fighting for the Press" in its decision May 7, 2015, limiting the controversial National Security Agency (NSA) domestic phone monitoring program. He represented the Times in four of its United States Supreme Court cases, including Branzburg v. Hayes in which the Times intervened on behalf of its reporter Earl Caldwell. The other cases were New York Times v. Sullivan, New York Times Co. v. United States (the Pentagon Papers case), and New York Times Co. v. Tasini. He was the leading force behind the Times' decision to publish the Pentagon Papers in 1971.

After the Times' outside counsel, Lord Day & Lord, advised the Times against publishing classified information and quit when the United States Justice Department threatened to sue the paper to stop publication, Goodale, who was attorney general for the Times, led his own legal team and directed the strategy that resulted in winning the Supreme Court case of New York Times Co. v. United States.

He has been called "the father of the reporter's privilege" because of his interpretation of the Branzburg case in the Hastings Law Journal. This led to the establishment of a reporter's privilege to protect reporter's sources in most states and federal circuits. Goodale created the specialty of First Amendment law among commercial lawyers. From 1972 to 2007, he established and chaired an annual Communications Law Seminar at the Practising Law Institute which through 2024 had over 21,000 attendees. This led to the creation of a First Amendment Bar. He continues to serve as the seminar's chairman emeritus.

After he left The New York Times in 1980, he joined the law firm of Debevoise & Plimpton LLP in New York City. There he founded a corporate group and a litigation group dealing with media, intellectual property, communications, and the First Amendment. These groups have represented many well-known U.S. communication entities including the New York Times, CBS, and NBC.

He served as chairman of the board for the Committee to Protect Journalists from 1989-1994. During his tenure he built CPJ into a significant international force, instrumental in the release of imprisoned journalists around the globe and continued to serve as senior advisor.

From 1995 to 2010 he produced and hosted over 300 programs for Digital Age, a TV show on WNYE about the effect of the internet on media, politics and society.

Since 1977 he has taught First Amendment and Communications law at Yale, New York University and Fordham law schools and has authored over 200 articles in publications such as The New York Times, The New York Review of Books, and the Stanford Law Review. Columbia Journalism Review has listed James Goodale as one of 200 who shaped New York Media. He was named by Time magazine in 1974 as one of the rising leaders in the United States.

Goodale was the recipient of the "Champion of the First Amendment Award," from the American Bar Association Forum in February 2014.

On May 5, 2015, PEN America awarded the 2015 PEN/Toni and James C. Goodale Freedom of Expression Courage Award to the French satirical weekly, Charlie Hebdo. Many of Charlie Hebdo's magazine editors had been killed in a homegrown jihadist terrorist attack for publishing satirical cartoons about Prophet Muhammad previously published in a Danish newspaper.

The award caused an international controversy as to whether it should have been given to Charlie Hebdo. Over 200 writers signed a protest against the award and many withdrew from the PEN dinner at which the award was given. In reply to attack on the award given by him and his wife, Goodale said, "the award is not for what is said. It's for the right to say it. In this case, journalists got killed for what they said. They should be honored, and my wife and I are extremely proud to do that." Victor Navasky, publisher of The Nation wrote an article titled "Why I Support PEN’s Courage Award to ‘Charlie Hebdo’"

On November 13, 2025 Harper's Magazine inaugurated the James C. Goodale First Amendment Award. James Goodale personally presented the award to A.G. Sulzberger, publisher of the New York Times, in recognition of his leadership in defending the freedom of the press in an era of misinformation and polarization.

== Education and early career ==
Goodale was born July 27, 1933, in Cambridge, Massachusetts. His mother, a college professor, was the daughter of the Shakespearean scholar Oscar James Campbell Jr. and he is the great grandson of Samuel Augustus Fuller. Goodale graduated from the Pomfret School and was an inductee in the Pomfret School Alumni Association’s Athletic Hall of Fame. He graduated Yale University in 1955, which he attended on the William Brinckerhoff Jackson Scholarship and where he was a member of Elihu a senior society. At Yale, he played on the baseball and hockey teams. In 2015 he was Recipient of the "George H.W. Bush '48 Lifetime of Leadership Award." He received his Juris Doctor from the University of Chicago Law School in 1958, which he attended on a National Honor Scholarship.

From 1959 to 1963, he worked for the Wall Street law firm of Lord Day & Lord. That firm was also the long time outside counsel of The New York Times. During this time he also served for six years in the Army Reserve as a strategic and intelligence research analyst, which influenced his views on over classification and convinced him it was not a crime to publish classified information.

== The New York Times ==
At age 29, Goodale set up the legal department at The New York Times and subsequently became its first General Attorney in 1963. In 1964, the Supreme Court decided New York Times v. Sullivan 9–0 in favor of the New York Times, overturning a libel conviction and establishing the modern rules of libel for public figures.

In 1967, Goodale spearheaded the financial reorganization of the Times. He advised the Times' publisher Arthur Ochs Sulzberger to purchase Cowles Communications, a transaction that helped the Times regain profitability. He also conceived and implemented the stock structure which was used to bring the New York Times public from a company in excess of $300 million to a diversified $3 billion company in 1990, a structure that was later copied by The Washington Post and other media companies.

=== Pentagon Papers ===
In March 1971, former Defense Department employee Daniel Ellsberg leaked top secret documents to New York Times reporter Neil Sheehan that revealed the United States true agenda in the Vietnam war known as the Pentagon Papers. Executives at the Times argued for three months about whether to publish them or not. Harding Bancroft, the Senior Vice President, Sidney Gruson, Assistant to the Publisher, and the Times' outside counsel, Lord Day & Lord, advised the Times not to publish. Goodale successfully convinced publisher Arthur Ochs Sulzberger that the First Amendment protected the New York Times from prosecution for publishing classified information.

On June 13, 1971, the Times printed its first articles and documents of the Pentagon Papers. When Attorney General John Mitchell indicated the Justice Department would sue the New York Times to stop any further publication, Lord Day & Lord refused to represent the Times and quit the night before the first court hearing. Goodale, along with the law firm of Cahill Gordon & Reindel and Yale Law School professor Alexander Bickel, defended the Times in court.

Goodale was the first to develop the now widely accepted arguments that the Espionage Act should not apply to publishers or the press. These arguments were later adopted after the Pentagon Papers trial by District Court Judge Murray Gurfein. After his decision, the Justice Department dropped the Espionage Act argument from the case.

In a 6–3 decision, the Supreme Court ruled the US government could not stop the Times from publishing the Pentagon Papers, holding that prior restraints were barred by the First Amendment unless the publication "will surely result in direct, immediate, and irreparable damage to our Nation or its people."

=== Reporter's privilege ===
In January 1970, as part of a wave of subpoenas issued to national reporters, New York Times reporter Earl Caldwell was subpoenaed by the US Justice Department. Media organizations such as Newsweek, Time, and Life magazines complied with their subpoenas, but Goodale caused the New York Times and Caldwell to challenge Caldwell's subpoena. Caldwell and the Times argued in court he did not have to answer questions from a grand jury about the identity of his sources because, as a member of the press, he was protected by the First Amendment. Caldwell and the New York Times won in the 9th Circuit Court of Appeals, thereby establishing reporter's privilege for the first time in any court.

In 1972, Caldwell v. United States was merged with two other similar cases at the Supreme Court and became known as Branzburg v. Hayes. Goodale crafted the media's strategy at the Supreme Court level. In a 5–4 decision, the Supreme Court overturned Caldwell's case and held reporters, in the circumstances of the case, do not have a First Amendment right to protect their sources and defy a subpoena. Justice Powell's concurrence with the majority was the swing vote.

Goodale subsequently wrote an article for the Hastings Law Journal in which he argued that Justice Powell's concurrence with the majority actually argued for a qualified reporter's privilege, "though, on its face, their ruling said just the opposite." He argued the Court's ruling was narrow and so the reporter's privilege should be judged on a case-by-case basis.

Using his article as a basis for protecting reporters' sources, he persuaded other media companies, such as Time, NBC, CBS, and The Washington Post to refuse to comply with government subpoenas. He argued using the power of contempt to resist requests for sources would cause state and federal courts, as well as state legislatures, to recognize a qualified reporters' privilege. This strategy succeeded, as over 1000 reporters privilege cases have been brought before state and federal court since his Hastings Law Review article, while only two or three were brought before. As of 2013, thirty nine states and the District of Columbia have some form of a reporter's shield law, ten other states have a common law privilege, and most federal circuits recognize a reporter's privilege as well—many using the language proposed in Goodale's law review article.

Goodale's interpretation of Powell's concurrence was confirmed in 2007, when notes of Powell's were discovered saying reporter's privilege cases should be decided on a case-by-case basis.

In October 1973, Vice President Spiro Agnew subpoenaed reporters for the New York Times and Washington Post for its sources on a story detailing the confidential criminal investigation into Agnew's dealings when he was Governor of Maryland. Instead of complying with the subpoenas, Goodale devised a strategy whereby the reporters' notes would be given to New York Times publisher A.O. Sulzberger and Washington Post owner Katharine Graham and they would refuse to hand them over to the court. If Agnew wanted the reporters' notes, the judge would have to send the owners of the two biggest newspapers in the country to jail. Agnew's subpoenas were dropped after he resigned the Vice Presidency the following month.

In 1978, New York Times reporter Myron Farber was subpoenaed by a New Jersey state court in the murder trial of Dr. Mario Jascalevich and refused to testify on the advice of Goodale. He subsequently caused Farber and the Times to go into contempt of court. Farber spent 40 days in jail and the New York Times was fined a total of $101,000. The Governor later returned the fines and New Jersey passed a state law providing reporters a qualified privilege in response to the case.

Because of his work at the New York Times, his law review article and subsequent media law seminars, Goodale has been called the "father of reporter's privilege."

== Post-New York Times career ==
Goodale joined Debevoise & Plimpton in 1980, bringing The New York Times as a client with him. He established two practice groups, one for the representation of media companies, particularly new media companies such as cable television, the other for First Amendment and intellectual property litigation.

At Debevoise, he or his groups have represented The New York Times, the Hearst Corporation, NBC, Cablevision, the New York Observer, Paris Review, Infinity Broadcasting, the NFL, NHL, and NBA. He has personally represented George Plimpton, Harry Evans, Tina Brown, Margaret Truman, and former New York City Mayor John Lindsay.

In 2001, Debevoise & Plimpton represented The New York Times in the Supreme Court case of New York Times Co. v. Tasini on the issue of copyright. This was the fourth case in which Goodale represented The New York Times at the Supreme Court.

As counsel to George Plimpton, Goodale convinced Plimpton to turn The Paris Review into a non-profit Foundation. Over the initial rejections of Plimpton, Goodale's decision to make the literary magazine a non-profit Foundation ensured The Paris Review would survive beyond Plimpton's 2003 death. Plimpton had been the magazine's editor and part owner since 1953. Under the new management of the Foundation, of which Goodale was a lead director, circulation grew from around 10,000 in 2003 to 28,000 in 2023, an unusually high number for a literary magazine.

Goodale also assisted in the creation of The New York Observer, which was founded by Arthur L. Carter. Goodale also arranged for Carter to purchase The Nation magazine from Victor Navasky, which was, in turn, re-purchased by Navasky.

=== Books ===
On April 30, 2013, Goodale's book Fighting for the Press: the Inside Story of the Pentagon Papers and Other Battles was published by CUNY Journalism Press and is now available on Amazon.

In this book, Goodale analyzes the importance of the Pentagon Papers case and also chronicles significant events in the history of freedom of the press in the United States from 1968 to the date of publication (2013). The New York Times, and the New York Review of Books reviewed the book favorably. The book received positive reviews from numerous other sources.

The Times said

Goodale, though, had a unique vantage point, and gives a deeply informed, even gossipy firsthand look at the legal strategy as well as conflicts between editorial and business interests inside the offices of the Times. He anticipated that the newspaper's white-shoe law firm -- it had the prayful name of Lord, Day & Lord -- would oppose publication, citing the Espionage Act. Its refusal to stand by the newspaper was a decision that will live in legal infamy. The Pentagon Papers case gets the most attention here, but Goodale doesn't neglect other, still unsettled First Amendment fights concerning the protection of a reporter's notes and sources.

The timing of the book proved to be fortuitous and prescient. Thirteen days after publication (May 13, 2013) it was reported that the government had obtained a secret warrant to search the Associated Press's (AP) records for the source of leaks about an alleged act of terrorism. Six days later (May 19) Fox News reporter James Rosen was named as a co-conspirator in an application for a search warrant for the records of Stephen Jin-Woo Kim, a source of Rosen's story about espionage in North Korea. On June 9, 2013, The Washington Post and The Guardian published Edward Snowden's leaks of a National Security Administration program to monitor the phone calls of U.S. citizens.

Since Goodale had predicted in his book that President Barack Obama would attempt to criminalize the newsgathering process, and because the Snowden leak was generally analogous to the leak of the Pentagon Papers, Goodale was swept up into the controversy involving these matters. His defense of the press in the AP and Rosen cases and the Washington Post and The Guardian in the publication of Snowden's leaks attracted national attention.

==== Other books ====
Goodale is the editor of The New York Times Company v. United States, a collection of the legal papers in the Pentagon Papers case which he assembled immediately following the decision in that case. It was published by Arno Press in 1971.

He also wrote All About Cable (Law Journal Press, New York, 1981). At the time cable was considered new media, and Goodale outlined the legal problems past, present and future facing cable television, including those concerning the First Amendment. The book has been cited twice by the United States Supreme Court.

=== Television and print ===
From 1995 to 2010, he hosted and produced Digital Age, a television program on media, politics and society, which aired on WNYE-TV, initially a PBS station, broadcast in 10 million homes in the New York metropolitan area. The program was called Telecommunications and the Internet Revolution from 1995 to 1999. His guests have included Ben Bradlee, Arthur O. Sulzberger Jr., Walter Cronkite, Tom Brokaw, Arthur Schlesinger, Henry Kissinger, Dan Rather, Chuck Schumer, and Michael Bloomberg.

He conceived, with Fred Friendly, Columbia University's media and society seminars. The program aired on PBS television as the "Fred Friendly Seminars."

From 1977 to 2010, he wrote a column in the New York Law Journal on "Communications and Media Law." His articles on the First Amendment have been published in The Stanford and Hastings Law Reviews, The New York Times, The New York Review of Books (cover piece)], The Nation, The New York Observer, The National Law Journal, The Guardian, The Daily Beast, Harper's Magazine, Columbia Journalism Review, The Neiman Reports, The Hill (for which he was opinion columnist). Click on this cite to read James Goodale's articles.

He has appeared on News War section of the award-winning PBS series Frontline, and the documentary The Most Dangerous Man in the America – Daniel Ellsberg and the Pentagon Papers, which was nominated for an Academy Award in 2009.

=== Teaching ===
Goodale has taught at Yale Law School from 1977 to 1980, New York University School of Law from 1983 to 1986 and Fordham Law School from 1986–2022.

He founded the Communications Law Seminar at the Practising Law Institute for media lawyers, which effectively formed the first media and First Amendment bar association for lawyers representing media companies. He chaired the Seminar from 1972 until its 35th anniversary in 2007. It is one of the largest legal seminars in the U.S.

With Yale and The Ford Foundation, he started in 1976 the Master of Studies in Law and Journalism Program (technically known as the Masters Study in Law) for journalists to specialize in law for one year at Yale Law School. Linda Greenhouse, the noted Times Supreme Court reporter, is a graduate of this program.

Goodale raised the lion's share of money for the endowed chair at Yale Law School in memory of Alexander Bickel, the constitutional scholar who participated in the Pentagon Papers case, 1971, and he simultaneously created scholarships at Yale Law School for four journalists annually to study in part under the holder of the Bickel Chair.

=== Politics ===
Goodale is a lifelong Democrat. He chaired the New York Lawyers Committee for the former Governor of Massachusetts Michael Dukakis, when Dukakis was the Democratic nominee for president in 1988. He was also a member of the Rules Committee of the 1988 Democratic National Convention.

In 1976, he was appointed by Governor Hugh Carey to the New York State Privacy & Security Committee and in 1988 was appointed by Chief Judge, Sol Wachtler to the New York State Judicial Committee for Minorities where he became chairman in 1991.

=== Boards ===
From 1989 to 2014, Goodale was a board member of the Committee to Protect Journalists. He served as the board's Chairman from 1989 to 1994, where he raised CPJ's profile internationally and significantly increased its budget. His first year as chairman, CPJ had a budget of $300,000 and no endowment. By 2021 it had a budget of more than $18 million with a $17 million endowment. Goodale has also served on the boards of The New York Times, New York Times Foundation, New York Observer, Human Rights Watch, Media Law Reporter, Paris Review Foundation, and the International Center for Journalists.

=== Controversy ===
In 2005, Goodale criticized Time editor Norman Pearlstine's decision to turn over reporter Matthew Cooper's notes to the grand jury investigating the leak of CIA operative Valerie Plame's name to the press. "A public company must protect its assets even if that means going into contempt," Goodale said. "It has an obligation under the First Amendment to protect those assets, and it's in the interest of shareholders to protect those assets.

Goodale called Pearlstine's decision "disgraceful" and attempted to have him removed from the board of the Committee to Protect Journalists. Pearlstine published his account of the controversy in a 2007 book Off the Record: The Press, the Government, and the War over Anonymous Sources.

=== Personal life ===
Goodale, an accomplished athlete, played ice-hockey and baseball at Yale and maintains a lifelong interest in both. He played football and basketball as well as hockey and baseball at Pomfret School and was inducted into the Pomfret School Athletic Hall of Fame in 2022. He owned the Sky Rink, a full-sized skating rink on 33rd Street in Manhattan. It later became the centerpiece of Chelsea Piers, one of the most visited sites in New York City. From 1998 to 2014 he published a digital newsletter for hockey hobbyists titled MMMCS. Its name was an acronym for the "Murray Murdoch Marching and Chowder Society." Murdoch, a former member of the New York Rangers, was Goodale's college coach. In 1973 he founded Washington Gunnery Hockey & Skating Association, a youth hockey organization in Washington, Connecticut.

Goodale is married to former Toni Krissel of New York City who was President of the international fundraising firm, T.K Goodale Associates. They are the parents of Timothy (Principal and CEO of Keel Harbour Capital Ltd.), Ashley (formerly of the NYC Office of Legal Counsel), and foster parents of Clayton Akiwenzie, a Native American, (Managing Director, Mortgage Banking, Berkadia, San Francisco).
