= Shield law =

Shield law may refer to:

- Reporters' privilege, preventing journalists from being forced to disclose their sources
  - California Shield Law
- Rape shield law, preventing the admission of evidence about past sexual activity in sexual assault trials
- Abortion shield laws in the United States, preventing people from being living in states where abortion (and sometimes gender-affirming care) is legal from being punished by states where it is illegal
