= Von Bulow v. Von Bulow =

American legal case

- Court: United States Court of Appeals for the Second Circuit
- Full case name: Martha von Bulow v. Claus von Bulow, et al
- Argued: December 19, 1986
- Decided: February 10, 1987
- Citations: 811 F.2d 136 (2nd Cir. 1987); 55 USLW 2462; 7 Fed.R.Serv.3d 389, 22 Fed. R. Evid. Serv. 737; 13 Media L. Rep. 2041

Case history
- Subsequent history: Certiorari denied April 20, 1987, 107 S.Ct. 1891.

Court membership
- Judges sitting: William Homer Timbers, Thomas Joseph Meskill, Amalya Lyle Kearse

Case opinions
- Majority: Timbers, joined by Meskill, Kearse

Von Bulow v. Von Bulow, 811 F.2d 136 (2nd Cir. 1987), was a case appealed from a contempt ruling after a United States District Court rejected the claim of a reporter's privilege by Claus von Bulow and Andrea Reynolds.

Reynolds, a paralegal, appealed a contempt ruling after she refused to submit an unpublished document for discovery. The United States Court of Appeals for the Second Circuit upheld the contempt order. The Court reasoned that a person who had gathered information for private use without the intent to gather the information as part of an investigation for a publication was not entitled to a reporter's privilege.

== See also ==
- First Amendment to the United States Constitution
- Branzburg v. Hayes
- In re Madden
