= Mortgage Specialists, Inc. v. Implode-Explode Heavy Industries, Inc. =

Case in the New Hampshire Supreme Court

The Mortgage Specialists v. Implode-Explode Heavy Industries
- Supreme Court of New Hampshire

Argued November 4, 2009 Decided May 6, 2010
- Full case name: The Mortgage Specialists, Inc. v. Implode-Explode Heavy Industries, Inc.
- Citation(s): 999 A.2d 184; 160 N.H. 227; 38 Media L. Rep. 1641; 2010 N.H. LEXIS 41 (N.H. 2010)

Case history
- Prior history: Motion for injunction to reveal personal identifiers granted by Rockingham County Superior Court 08-E-0572 (N.H. Super. 2008). Motion for stay of order granted on appeal.
- Subsequent history: Judgment reversed motion to dismiss granted on reconsideration

Holding
- A website operator is a “reporter” and has newsgathering privileges. It need not disclose the source of its information unless the trial court is given detailed information by the plaintiff that would justify such action. The plaintiff would have to show that the published information by the web visitor likely was defamatory; in that case, revelation of the identity of the web visitor may be proper. The trial court may not issue an injunction against republication of the material—that would be an impermissible prior restraint in violation of the First Amendment. Protections for traditional print media extend to online publishers whereby preventing a website from posting a leaked document is an unlawful prior restraint on speech.

Court membership
- Chief Justice: John Broderick
- Associate Justices: Linda Dalianis; Carol Ann Conboy; James Duggan; Gary Hicks

Case opinions
- Majority: Conboy, joined by Broderick, Dalianis
- Concurrence: Duggan, joined by Hicks

Laws applied
- U.S. Const. amend. I N.H. Const. Pt. I, Art. 22.

The Mortgage Specialists, Inc. v. Implode-Explode Heavy Industries, Inc. is a New Hampshire Supreme Court case in which Mortgage Specialists, a mortgage lender, sought to obtain the identity of an anonymous source who provided Implode-Explode Heavy Industries (Implode), a website monitoring risky lenders, with a confidential document detailing Mortgage Specialists' loan practices. Mortgage Specialists also sought to prohibit the republication of the document and learn the identity of an anonymous individual who allegedly defamed Mortgage Specialists on Implode's website. Mortgage Specialists disputed Implode's status as a news organization, claiming that it should not be afforded the rights of a news organization under the First Amendment to the U.S. Constitution and Part I, Article 22 of the New Hampshire Constitution.

The resulting court decision found that Internet news outlets should be treated like print media and receive the same legal privileges granted to traditional journalists. Similarly, the court found that the publication of the confidential documents could not be restrained and that the identity of the anonymous poster was protected so long as Mortgage Specialists could not prove harm. This case set a precedent for protecting the legal rights of online media and reiterates the high legal hurdle required to restrict the free flow of information.

== Background ==
Implode was a website that reported on risky mortgage lenders and allowed users to post comments on different lenders. Mortgage Specialists was a mortgage lender. In August 2008, Implode posted a report describing "administrative actions taken by the New Hampshire Banking Department against Mortgage Specialists." The story included a link to a loan chart that allegedly documented Mortgage Specialists' loan practices. An anonymous poster acting under the pseudonym Brianbattersby posted two comments about Mortgage Specialists on the site. Mortgage Specialists filed suit in New Hampshire Superior Court, seeking an injunction that would require Implode to remove the postings and the link and disclose the identity of Brianbattersby and the source of the loan chart. Mortgage Specialists contended that linking to the chart was an invasion of privacy and was unlawful under RSA 383:10-b (2006), which provides for the confidentiality of reports prepared by the state banking authority. Mortgage Specialists alleged that the Brianbattersby postings were false and defamatory. The trial court ordered Implode not to link to the loan chart, to take down the postings, and to disclose the identity of Brianbattersby and the source of the loan chart. Implode appealed to the New Hampshire Supreme Court.

== Court findings ==
=== Newsgathering privileges for online publishers ===
Implode argued that it qualified for the "newsgathering privilege" provided by Part 1, Article 22 of the New Hampshire Constitution, which protects members of the press from revealing the identity of their source. In contrast, Mortgage Specialists argued that Implode should not be afforded any such protection because Implode was not a news organization. In arriving at a decision, the court considered what constituted a media outlet. The court cited Opinion of the Justices, in which the court had avoided deciding "the scope of the privilege" and "what qualifies as 'press.'"

The court also cited the U.S. Supreme Court's decision in Branzburg v. Hayes, which states:

Freedom of the press is a fundamental personal right which is not confined to newspapers and periodicals. . . . Almost any author may quite accurately assert that he is contributing to the flow of information to the public, that he relies on confidential sources of information, and that these sources will be silenced if he is forced to make disclosures.

Ultimately, the court found that Implode was "a legitimate publisher of information and a member of the press" and that "the fact that Implode operates a website makes it no less a member of the press".

The court then rejected Mortgage Specialists' argument that Downing v. Monitor Publishing Co., Inc. was controlling. The court distinguished Downing because Mortgage Specialists brought no libel claim against Implode.

The court noted that reporters can be compelled to reveal their sources because New Hampshire's newsgathering privilege is a qualified one. The court then vacated the trial court's decision and remanded the case in order to determine whether Mortgage Specialists' interests outweighed disrupting the free flow of information.

=== Defamation and anonymous speech ===
Apart from the source of the confidential loan documents, Mortgage Specialists also sought the identity of Brianbattersby, whose posting were allegedly defamatory. The trial court had originally required that Implode comply with Mortgage Specialists' request. The Supreme Court adopted the Dendrite test, holding that "the qualified privilege to speak anonymously requires the trial court to 'balanc[e] ... the equities and rights at issue,' thus ensuring that a plaintiff alleging defamation has a valid reason for piercing the speaker's anonymity." The court then vacated the trial court's decision and remanded the case on this issue.

=== Enjoining publication and prior restraint ===
The final component of the case examined whether Implode could be restricted from further publishing the loan documents and Brianbattersby's comments. Mortgage Specialists contended that the publication of the loan chart was a breach of privacy and that Brianbattersby's comments were unlawful and defamatory. The court considered a long history of prior restraint, which requires that publications "threaten an interest more fundamental than the First Amendment itself". The court relied on Nebraska Press Association v. Stuart, an earlier ruling by the U.S. Supreme Court that required parties seeking prior restraint to show "that publication will result in damage to a near sacred right" and that "no less extreme measures are available." The court denied Mortgage Specialists' request for prior restraint, stating:

While it may be true that Mortgage Specialists' loan information is "confidential," such information is certainly not more sensitive than the documents at issue in the Pentagon Papers case . . . Accordingly, we conclude that Mortgage Specialists' interests in protecting its privacy and reputation do not justify the extraordinary remedy of prior restraint.

== Reaction ==
The Nashua Telegraph published an editorial about the case before the court's decision was announced, arguing that the ruling would be applied to traditional media outlets as well as websites. Thus, it suggested, a loss for Implode could "have a dangerous chilling effect on both mainstream and independent journalism in the state." Sam Bayard, blogging at the Citizen Media Law Project, praised the New Hampshire Supreme Court's opinion for correcting "errors" by the trial court, particularly the holding on the reporter's privilege.

== See also ==
- Obsidian Finance Group, LLC v. Cox (N.H., 2014)
