= In re Madden =

- Court: United States Court of Appeals for the Third Circuit
- Full case name: In re: Mark Madden; Titan Sports, Inc., A Delaware Corporation v. Turner Broadcasting Systems, Inc.; World Championship Wrestling, Inc.; Eric Bischoff; Titan Sports, Inc.
- Decided: July 21, 1998
- Citation: 151 F.3d 125 (3rd Cir. 1998)

Case history
- Prior history: Titan Sports, Inc. v. Turner Broad. Sys., Inc., 967 F. Supp. 142 (W.D. Pa. 1997).

Holding
- An individual may be afforded a journalist's privilege if he can prove he is (1) engaged in investigative reporting, (2) is gathering news, and (3) possessed the intent at the inception of the news-gathering process to disseminate the news to the public.

Court membership
- Judges sitting: Richard Lowell Nygaard, Samuel Alito, Donald P. Lay (8th Cir.)

Case opinions
- Majority: Nygaard, joined by a unanimous court

In re Madden, 151 F.3d 125 (3d Cir. 1998), is a decision from the Third Circuit Court of Appeals that established the Madden test, a test used to determine whether an individual is entitled to claim a journalist's privilege.

== Facts and lower court procedure ==
In re Madden was an appeal by Titan Sports, now known as World Wrestling Entertainment, Inc., in the case Titan Sports, Inc. v. Turner Broad. Sys., Inc. Titan, the parent company of World Wrestling Entertainment, at the time known as the World Wrestling Federation, had sought to discover anonymous sources used by Mark Madden, an employee of World Championship Wrestling (WCW), which at the time had Turner Broadcasting Systems, Inc. as its parent company. Madden, citing his journalist's privilege, refused to disclose the names of the sources during his deposition. The District Court upheld his right to the privilege under Pennsylvania's shield law.

== Holding and reasoning ==
Titan appealed the initial ruling, and the Court of Appeals reversed, finding that Madden was an entertainer and not a journalist.

Known as the Madden test, the Court said that an individuals claiming the protections of the journalist's privilege must demonstrate the concurrence of three elements, that they: (1) are engaged in investigative reporting; (2) are gathering news; and (3) possess the intent at the inception of the news-gathering process to disseminate the news to the public.

The Court said:

It is clear from the record that Mr. Madden was not investigating “news,” even were we to apply a generous definition of the word. Madden admits in his deposition that his work for the WCW amounts to a mix of entertainment with reporting. He states that “with the WCW 900 number, I say things tongue [in] cheek. I say things for satire value, I say things to be funny, and sometimes I will take something like that and use it for humor value.” Furthermore, the record indicates that WCW executives told Madden to “be a little crazy, say off the wall stuff, entertain, use a lot of humor, sort of work-sort of be like the bad guy in the literal sense, not in terms of what I say is always going to be false, but in terms of what I say is going to get people excited.” Even if Madden's efforts could be considered as “newsgathering,” his claim of privilege would still fail because, as an author of entertaining fiction, he lacked the intent at the beginning of the research process to disseminate information to the public. He, like other creators of fictional works, intends at the beginning of the process to create a piece of art or entertainment. Fiction or entertainment writers are permitted to view facts selectively, change the emphasis or chronology of events or even fill in factual gaps with fictitious events-license a journalist does not have. Because Madden is not a journalist, it follows that he cannot conceal his information within the shadow of the journalist's privilege.

== See also ==
- First Amendment to the United States Constitution
- Branzburg v. Hayes
- Von Bulow v. von Bulow
