= Lurma Rackley =

American activist and writer

Lurma M. Rackley (born April 24, 1949) is an American author, journalist and publicist. The daughter of a civil rights activist, she participated in civil rights demonstrations and was arrested 16 times before she was 13 years old. After college, she became a journalist and later, a publicist with the Washington, D.C. city government. In 1981, Petey Greene asked her to collaborate with him on his autobiography, recording audiotaped interviews with her shortly before his death. Rackley published her book about Greene in 2004.

== Biography ==
Rackley is the daughter of civil rights activist Gloria Blackwell. Her mother and father got divorced when she and her sister were very young and were adopted by her mother's second husband, Larney G. Rackley, a professor at South Carolina State University.

Active with her mother in Orangeburg, South Carolina during the Civil Rights Movement, Rackley was arrested sixteen times by the age of 13. Once, she and her mother missed a court appearance when they used the "whites only" restroom in the courthouse and were arrested. Although an honors student, at the age of 14, she was sentenced to seven years in reform school because of her many arrests as part of the Orangeburg Freedom Movement. Then-attorney Matthew J. Perry appealed the sentence and obtained her release. When threatened with reform school, Rackley's mother wanted her to stop protesting, but Rackley refused. She told her mother she couldn't stop when others were putting themselves on the line, so they reached a compromise that neither would picket if the other were in jail.

Rackley received a Bachelor of Arts degree from Clark College, now Clark Atlanta University in 1970 and a special Masters degree from the Columbia University School of Journalism that same year. She got her first job after college in late 1970 at The Evening Star, which later became The Washington Star. In 1979, she left to work for the city government in Washington, D.C., eventually becoming the press secretary for Washington, D.C. mayor Marion Barry during some of Barry's public struggles.

In 1981, Rackley was asked to write an article about Greene for the Washington North Star. After the interview, Greene spoke to her about collaborating with him to write his autobiography. Over the course of a year, they recorded audiotaped interviews until Greene fell terminally ill. After Greene's death, interest in publishing the book weakened. Rackley eventually published it herself in 2004.

After eleven years of working for the city, Rackley left to work for Hill and Knowlton, a public relations firm, where she was vice president in charge of media relations. After two years, she left to head up the communications department of Amnesty International USA. She then worked at Eddie Bauer, where she set up their corporate social responsibility unit. She then joined CARE, where she was head of media relations. She now works for Habitat for Humanity and as a freelance writer.

== Personal ==
She has one son, Rumal Rackley, from her relationship with Gil Scott-Heron and lives in Atlanta. In late 2011, heirs of Scott-Heron who were challenging Rumal Rackley as an heir accused him of not being Gil Scott-Heron's son when they said that he had failed a DNA test taken with a relative. The Surrogate Court of New York ruled in December 2018 that the purported test did not count as proof and had no standing. A Surrogate Court Judge ruled that Rumal Rackley is a rightful heir, Gil Scott-Heron's son, and named him permanent administrator of Gil Scott-Heron's estate. (Verifiable through Surrogate Court records.)

== Books ==
- Kenneth Walker, Earl Caldwell, Lurma Rackley, Black American Witness: Reports from the Front (1994). Lion House Publishing. ISBN 1-886446-10-5
- Lurma Rackley, Laugh If You Like, Ain't a Damn Thing Funny: The Life Story of Ralph "Petey" Greene as Told to Lurma Rackley (2004), Xlibris ISBN 1-4134-3288-3(self-published)
