= Senior administration official =

US press term to indicate the identity of a source

The title senior administration official is a term used by the American press to indicate the identity of a source while retaining his or her anonymity. As the title is subjective, the reporter writing the article is allowed to decide if a source should be called one. Most reporters require the source to have "commissioned status". These include any Assistant to the President, Deputy Assistant to the President, and Special Assistant to the President (all of these people are members of the Executive Office of the President). However, senior administration officials almost always have the rank of Assistant. Other people that can be classified using this title include the Vice President and Cabinet secretaries (occasionally deputies and undersecretaries as well). Sometimes officials request that they be identified using other titles to prevent anybody from determining their true identity.

== Examples ==
- Scooter Libby, former chief of staff to Vice President Dick Cheney, was referred to as a "former Hill staffer" by New York Times reporter Judith Miller. The use of high-ranking, anonymous sources caused numerous scandals for the George W. Bush administration, most notably the Plame Affair.
- On September 5, 2018, The New York Times published an op-ed essay by an unnamed "senior official in the Trump administration," who claimed to be part of "a quiet resistance within the administration of people choosing to put country first." The author was revealed on October 28, 2020, to be Miles Taylor, who had served as chief of staff for Department of Homeland Security Secretary Kirstjen Nielsen.

== See also ==
- Cabinet of the United States
