= Obsidian Finance Group, LLC v. Cox =

2011 US legal case concerning online defamation

- Court: United States Court of Appeals for the Ninth Circuit
- Full case name: Obsidian Finance Group, LLC and Kevin D. Padrick v. Crystal Cox
- Decided: January 17, 2014

Case history
- Prior actions: District Court hold that Cox is denied protection under Oregon's media shield statutes and retraction statutes because she is not a journalist.
- Subsequent action: New trial on the blog post at issue.

Holding
- First Amendment negligence standard for private defamation actions is not limited to cases with institutional media defendants and Cox as a blogger could not be held liable for defamation unless she acted negligently.

Court membership
- Judges sitting: Arthur Alarcón, Milan Smith, and Andrew D. Hurwitz

Keywords
- Defamation Law, Media Shield Law

Obsidian Finance Group, LLC v. Cox is a 2011 case from the United States District Court for the District of Oregon concerning online defamation. Plaintiffs Obsidian Finance Group and its co-founder Kevin Padrick sued Crystal Cox for maintaining several blogs that accused Obsidian and Padrick of corrupt and fraudulent conduct. The court dismissed most of Cox's blog posts as opinion, but found one single post to be more factual in its assertions and therefore defamatory. For that post, the court awarded the plaintiffs $2.5 million in damages. This case is notable for the court's ruling that Cox, as an internet blogger, was not a journalist and was thus not protected by Oregon's media shield laws, although the court later clarified that its ruling did not categorically exclude blogs from being considered media and indicated that its decision was based in part upon Cox offering to remove negative posts for a $2,500 fee. In January 2014 the Ninth Circuit Court affirmed in part and reversed in part the district court's judgment awarding compensatory damages to the bankruptcy trustee. It also ordered a new trial on the blog post at issue.

== Background ==
Obsidian Finance Group is a financial advisory firm which was managing the bankruptcy of Summit 1031, a real estate company. Crystal Cox is a self-proclaimed "investigative blogger" who maintained the blogs obsidianfinancesucks.com, summit1031sucks.com, and bankruptcycorruption.com, amongst various others. On her blogs, Cox accused Obsidian and its co-founder Kevin Padrick of committing tax fraud, paying off the media and politicians, intimidating and threatening whistleblowers, and engaging in various other illegal activities in their handling of the bankruptcy. Cox repeatedly claimed that her investigations would expose Obsidian and Padrick's corruption. In response, Obsidian and Padrick brought suit against Cox for defamation, asserting that all of Cox's claims were false and damaging Padrick's reputation.

== Procedural history ==
The court initially intended to dismiss the defamation claims against Cox. To establish a defamation claim, the alleged defamatory material must be asserting a fact that can be proven true or false, as opposed to merely stating an opinion. The court held that even though Cox's allegations of fraud and corruption are technically assertions of fact, they appeared on obviously biased blogs and Cox made no attempt to provide supporting evidence. The court ruled that in the context of Cox's ranting, hyperbolic blog posts, the allegations are unlikely to be taken as fact by any of her audience. As a result, the court held that Cox's right to voice her opinions was protected by the First Amendment and that her statements could not be considered defamation.

However, after plaintiffs submitted additional blog posts for review, the court found one post to be more factual in tone and content than the others. The post delved into the details of Summit's bankruptcy filing and tax liability, and made specific accusations against Obsidian and Padrick for lying on tax filings and stealing money. The court allowed the defamation claim on this one particular post to move forward.

A trial was held on November 29, 2011, and the jury ruled in favor of the plaintiffs, awarding Obsidian and Padrick $2.5 million in damages.

== Opinion of the Court ==
After the trial, on November 30, 2011, the court issued an opinion clarifying some of its pre-trial oral rulings.

=== Oregon's shield and retraction statutes ===
Cox had claimed that her allegations against Obsidian and Padrick were based on evidence from a secret source, and she refused to name her source citing media shield protection. Under Oregon's media shield laws, any person involved with a "medium of communication to the public" did not have to reveal the source of their information, where "medium of communication" is defined as "including but not limited to" a list of traditional modes of media such as newspapers, magazines, television, and so on. The court did not specifically decline to interpret the statutes to include bloggers as "media", rather holding that based on the facts of the case, Cox was not affiliated with any of the enumerated mediums, had no indicia of reliability as a journalist, and thus she did not qualify for the media shield laws.

Additionally, the court held that even if Cox could be considered "media", she would still not qualify. Oregon's media shield does not apply in a civil defamation lawsuit, where the defendant has asserted "a defense based on the[...] source of allegedly defamatory information."

Cox also tried to assert immunity under Oregon's retraction statutes, which state that general damages for defamation could only be awarded if the plaintiffs had sought a retraction, which Padrick had not. The court again held that Cox did not qualify because her blogs and practices did not fall under any of the traditional modes of media specifically enumerated in the statute.

=== First Amendment issues ===
Cox asserted that because the plaintiffs are public figures and because she blogged about a matter of public concern, First Amendment protections are triggered. As a result, to prove defamation, actual malice on Cox's part must be shown. "Actual malice" would require that Cox had knowledge of the truth and knowingly disregarded the facts, instead of simply making a false assertion of facts on her blog. Ultimately, the court held that neither Obsidian or Padrick were public figures, stating that the Summit 1031 bankruptcy Cox blogged on was neither controversial nor newsworthy, and Cox was the only person trying to publicize the issue. As a result, actual malice did not need to be proven by the plaintiffs.

=== Media protections to defamation ===
Cox also asserted that even if the plaintiffs weren't public figures, in order for the plaintiffs to claim damages, they must prove actual malice because she is a "media" outlet. Here, the court again held that Cox did not qualify as "media". In its reasoning, the court cited her lack of a journalism degree, lack of affiliation with traditional media outlets, lack of adherence to journalistic standards such as fact-checking and fair coverage, and the absence of Cox writing any original material rather than assembling the works of others. As such, the plaintiffs could seek damages without any further evidence of actual malice.

== Reactions and status after district court ruling ==
The holdings in this case re-ignited a public discussion over whether bloggers should be considered journalists and entitled to the same protections. Cox suggested that this case "should matter to everyone who writes on the Internet" and that if she "[doesn't] win [her] appeal, we all lose". Padrick responded by saying that "the concept of media [would be] rendered worthless [...] if anyone can self-proclaim themselves to be media". Padrick also pointed out the real damage done to his reputation and business by Cox, and stated his belief that he would have won the case even if Cox had been considered "media". Subsequently, a World Intellectual Property Organization arbitration decision ordered the disputed domain names marcjohnrandazza.com, marcjrandazza.com, marcrandazza.com, marcrandazza.biz, marcrandazza.info and marcrandazza.mobi all to be transferred to Marc J. Randazza.

Cox's motion for a new trial was denied. Currently, Cox is seeking to appeal the judgment, citing First Amendment grounds. Obsidian has filed a motion to seize and sell Cox's right to appeal to help satisfy its $2.5 million judgment, on the grounds that Cox's appeal right is intangible personal property subject to seizure. Cox is attempting to block the seizure to proceed with the appeal.

== United States Court of Appeals for the Ninth Circuit ruling ==
After granting Cox motion for appeal a unanimous three-judge panel of the Ninth Circuit Court issued its judgement in Obsidian Finance Group LLC and Kevin Padrick vs. Crystal Cox (2014) on January 17, 2014.

=== Judgement summary and First Amendment defamation impact ===
==== Judgement summary ====
A court summary produced by court staff summarized the Ninth Circuit ruling as follows:

The panel affirmed in part and reversed in part the district court's judgment awarding compensatory damages to a bankruptcy trustee on a defamation claim against an Internet blogger. The panel extended the principle held in Gertz v. Robert Welch, Inc., 418 U.S. 323, 350 (1974), that the First Amendment required only a "negligence standard for private defamation actions", is not limited to cases with institutional media defendants. The panel further held that the blog post at issue addressed a matter of public concern, and the district court should have instructed the jury that it could not find the blogger liable for defamation unless it found that she acted negligently. The panel held that the bankruptcy trustee did not become a "public official" simply by virtue of court appointment, or by receiving compensation from the court. The panel remanded for a new trial on the blog post at issue, and affirmed the district court's summary judgment on the other blog posts that were deemed constitutionally protected opinions.

==== First Amendment defamation impact ====
The issue whether First Amendment defamation rules apply equally to both the institutional press and individual speakers has never been decided by the U.S. Supreme Court. But every United States appeals court which addressed this issue concluded that the First Amendment defamation rules in Sullivan (1964) and its progeny case Gertz v. Robert Welch, Inc. (1974) apply equally to the institutional press and individual speakers. The Ninth Circuit followed this trend with its January 2014 ruling by holding that a blogger is entitled to the same free speech protections as a traditional journalist and cannot be liable for defamation unless he acted negligently. The court essentially said journalists and bloggers are one and the same when it comes to the First Amendment. The court ruling is also a novelty because for the first time an appeals court ruled that a blogger is entitled to the same free speech protections as a traditional journalist and cannot be liable for defamation unless the blogger acted negligently.

The three judge panel of the Ninth Circuit ruled ruled that liability for a defamatory blog post involving a matter of public concern cannot be imposed without proof of fault and actual damages. Bloggers saying libelous things about private citizens concerning public matters can only be sued if they're negligent i.e. the plaintiff must prove the defendants negligence – the same standard that applies when news media are sued. The federal appellate court thus essentially said that journalists and bloggers are one and the same when it comes to the First Amendment and, in the words of Eugene Volokh, a professor at the UCLA School of Law, that nonprofessional press, especially bloggers, "for First Amendment purposes, have the same rights as others do, as for example the institutional media does."

The unanimous three-judge panel rejected the argument that the negligence standard established for private defamation actions by the U.S. Supreme Court in Gertz v. Robert Welch, Inc. only applied to "the institutional press." "The Gertz court did not expressly limit its holding to the defamation of institutional media defendants," Judge Andrew Hurwitz wrote for the three-judge panel. "And, although the Supreme Court has never directly held that the Gertz rule applies beyond the institutional press, it has repeatedly refused in non-defamation contexts to accord greater First Amendment protection to the institutional media than to other speakers." Hurwitz wrote: "The protections of the First Amendment do not turn on whether the defendant was a trained journalist, formally affiliated with traditional news entities, engaged in conflict-of-interest disclosure, went beyond just assembling others' writings or tried to get both sides of a story. … In defamation cases, the public-figure status of a plaintiff and the public importance of the statement at issue -- not the identity of the speaker -- provide the First Amendment touchstones."

== See also ==
- Mortgage Specialists, Inc. v. Implode-Explode Heavy Industries, Inc. (N.H., 2010)
