= Gloria Blackwell =

African American civil rights activist and educator

Dr. Gloria Blackwell
- Born: March 11, 1927; Dillon County, South Carolina
- Died: December 7, 2010 (aged 83)
- Other name: Gloria Rackley
- Citizenship: United States
- Education: Claflin College; S.C. State University; Emory University
- Occupation: Educator
- Years active: 1950s–1993
- Organization: NAACP
- Known for: Civil rights activism
- Movement: Orangeburg Freedom Movement
- Children: Lurma Rackley, Jamelle Rackley

Gloria Blackwell, also known as Gloria Rackley (March 11, 1927 – December 7, 2010), was an African-American civil rights activist and educator. She was at the center of the Civil Rights Movement in Orangeburg, South Carolina during the 1960s, attracting some national attention and a visit by Dr. Martin Luther King of the Southern Christian Leadership Conference. Her activities were widely covered (and criticized) by the local press.

Arrested for sitting in the "whites only" area of the regional hospital when her daughter needed emergency treatment, Blackwell sued and won, ending its segregation. After being fired by the city's white school board in economic retaliation, she sued the board and won in 1962. She left the state in the 1960s, teaching at colleges and universities. She earned a doctorate at Emory University in 1973, and taught at Clark Atlanta University for 20 years.

== Biography ==
Gloria Thomasina Blackwell was born in Little Rock in Dillon County, South Carolina, the second of three children and the only girl, to Harrison Benjamin Blackwell (born 1889), a barber, and Lurline Olivia Thomas Blackwell (born 1895), a teacher at the Little Rock Colored School and musician at the Methodist church. Her brothers were Harrison and LeGrand. Her father was a businessman and barber. Her mother was a school teacher, pianist, choir director, community volunteer and daughter of Methodist minister Rev. LeGrand Lee Thomas. Gloria's maternal granduncle S. J. McDonald was active with the National Association for the Advancement of Colored People (NAACP), established in 1909. Methodist minister. Blackwell attended Mather Academy in Camden, South Carolina and graduated high school in Sumter, South Carolina in 1943. At the age of 16, she enrolled at her mother's alma mater, Claflin College in Orangeburg.

In 1944, Blackwell left college to marry James "Jimmy" Becknell. They had three daughters and lived for a time in Detroit, Michigan, and Chicago, Illinois, where many blacks migrated from the South during the Great Migration. The marriage ended in divorce. Blackwell lost her eldest daughter at the age of 5 in a car accident, which left the mother with a scar on her face. She returned to live in Orangeburg near her family with her two small daughters.

Blackwell completed her degree at Claflin, graduating with a Bachelor of Science in 1953. When she married again, her second husband, Larney G. (Jack) Rackley, a professor at South Carolina State University, adopted her daughters, Jamelle and Lurma, giving them his surname. Blackwell continued with graduate study, receiving a Master of Arts degree in education from South Carolina State University. She later returned to university for additional graduate education, earning a doctorate in 1973 in American studies from Emory University in Atlanta.

Blackwell became an elementary school teacher in Orangeburg, teaching third grade. Like the rest of the state, the city had segregated public schools. Whites used economic retaliation to try to suppress civil rights activism in the 1960s and fired Blackwell in 1964. She challenged the action in a civil suit and won restoration to her job, but she and her husband decided to leave the area. Later Blackwell moved to Virginia for a job teaching English at Norfolk State College, now Norfolk State University. From 1968 to 1970, she directed African-American studies at American International College in Springfield, Massachusetts. After completing her doctorate, in 1973 Blackwell began teaching at Clark Atlanta University. She continued there for her remaining academic career until retirement in 1993.

== Civil rights activity ==
Blackwell became active in the Civil Rights Movement in the 1950s, which in Orangeburg was based in the congregation of the Trinity United Methodist Church. Protestors always prayed before going to a demonstration. Blackwell had long been involved with the church, having been president of the Methodist Youth Fellowship on the state level even before entering Claflin as a student; it was a Methodist-founded college. Later, she volunteered and recruited for the NAACP, eventually becoming central in what became known as the "Orangeburg Freedom Movement." She became an officer in the local NAACP.

In October 1961, Blackwell was arrested for sitting in the whites only waiting area of Orangeburg hospital with her daughter Jamelle, whom she had taken to the emergency room for an injured finger. She had been directed to the "colored" waiting area, a pile of crates and a space next to a soda machine. Blackwell returned to the whites-only area; she was arrested. She was defended in court by Matthew J. Perry, whose defense of her was so vigorous that he was charged with contempt of court and briefly jailed. Blackwell and her daughter filed a civil lawsuit, Rackley v. Tri-County Hospital, against the officials of the hospital, asserting that the operation of separate facilities violated her constitutional rights. Blackwell won her suit, the criminal case was dropped, and the facility was integrated at a time when the state still had segregated public facilities. The Orangeburg case attracted national attention and activist Dr. Martin Luther King visited the city.

The Orangeburg County chapter of the NAACP made the integration of public schools its priority; the chapter members were visited often by Roy Wilkins and Thurgood Marshall of the NAACP; the latter had successfully argued the landmark desegregation case, Brown v. Board of Education (1954), before the United States Supreme Court. Blackwell, then known by her married name of Rackley, began to participate and lead nonviolent demonstrations to desegregate the schools, hospitals, and other public accommodations in the city. Her daughters accompanied her at protests. Once, she and her daughter Lurma missed a court appearance because they were arrested when they used the "whites only" restroom in the county courthouse. Because Blackwell was acting outside the standard for black women, her regular public protests were vilified in the white press, which described her as "dangerously wild". Even some blacks avoided her for fear of being linked with her, as the white community was trying to repress activism by economic retaliation against all suspected activists: firing some, evicting people from rental housing, and boycotting businesses or preventing loans. Rackley's parents were concerned: her father supported her activities but her mother was worried not only about Rackley but also about the participation of her daughters in these activities.

The white superintendent of schools fired Blackwell/Rackley as a third-grade teacher from the Negro schools and South Carolina State University did not renew her husband's teaching contract. At this news, blacks boycotted Orangeburg's seven Negro schools. Demonstrations included one in which 57 minors marched in protest; they were arrested for breach of peace and spent a night in jail. Rackley was invited by the United Federation of Teachers in New York City to speak at a civil rights rally in December 1963, along with nationally known author James Baldwin. In the dismissal letter, the superintendent of schools wrote that Blackwell was "rabid in her zeal for social change and was unfit to be a teacher." Blackwell filed a civil lawsuit against the school district for her dismissal and won restoration to her job.

After passage of the Civil Rights Act of 1964, Blackwell felt she could leave the city. She moved to Norfolk, Virginia, taking a job at Norfolk State University. Later she moved to Atlanta, gaining her doctorate from Emory University and teaching at Clark Atlanta University.

== Personal life ==
Known for her beauty as well as her activism, Blackwell was often asked why she didn't get plastic surgery to remove the scar on her face from the car accident that killed her oldest daughter. She said that after losing her child, a scar was unimportant.

Blackwell was married a total of five times, twice to the same man after an interval of more than 30 years. During the civil rights era, she was known in Orangeburg by her then-married name of Rackley. Later, to avoid confusion, Blackwell chose to use her maiden name as her professional name.

After being divorced from Rackley, Blackwell married Louis C. Frayser. They divorced in 1970. They remarried in 2007 (her fifth marriage).

In 1987 at the age of 60, Blackwell and her fourth husband, Charles DeJournette, adopted a son. Five years later they adopted his brother.

In retirement, Blackwell continued to speak to groups about her experiences in the civil rights movement, encouraging younger people to work for social justice. While living in Atlanta, she also worked to raise money and support to restore Martin Luther King's boyhood home. Since 1980 it has been designated as one of the contributing buildings of the Martin Luther King Jr. National Historic Site.

== Honors ==
At her death in 2010, Congressman James Clyburn called Blackwell "fearless" and said, "She was just a tremendous spirit." Richard Reid, president of the Orangeburg Historical and Genealogical Society, said, "The actions taken by Mrs. Rackley by far placed her in the same class as that of Rosa Parks and South Carolina's own Septima Clark and Modjeska Simkins. Around Orangeburg, the name ... Gloria Rackley ... was pretty much a 'household name.'"

Not only did [Blackwell] put her body on the line at civil rights demonstrations, but she also served as a role model for other women who were too frightened to challenge the traditional role that the community had set aside for female behavior. She encouraged the youth because she was a teacher standing up for her rights. She was jailed, maligned, ostracized, and fired from gainful employment because of her activities on behalf of others.

— Barbara A. Woods, "Working in the Shadows: Southern Women and Civil Rights", in Southern Women at the Millennium: A Historical Perspective (2003)

In January 2011, Blackwell was honored posthumously in Dillon County, the place of her birth, on Martin Luther King Jr. Day with a Lifetime Community Service Award.

== See also ==
- Orangeburg massacre

== Bibliography ==
- Barbara A. Woods, "Working in the Shadows: Southern Women and Civil Rights". In: Melissa Walker, Jeanette R. Dunn, Joe P. Dunn, editors. Southern Women at the Millennium: A Historical Perspective. University of Missouri Press, Columbia, Missouri (2003) ISBN 0-8262-1505-X
