= Earl Caldwell (journalist) =

American journalist

- Born: c. 1939 (age 86–87)
- Education: University of Buffalo
- Occupation: Journalist

Earl Caldwell (born c. 1939) is an American journalist. He documented the Black Panther Party from the inside in 1969, and became embroiled in a landmark 1972 decision by the U.S. Supreme Court clarifying reporters' rights. The case started when the FBI pressured Caldwell unsuccessfully to be an informant against the Black Panther Party.

Caldwell has worked for The New York Times, the New York Daily News, The New York Amsterdam News, The New York Post and on the radio in New York City. His career as a journalist spans more than four decades. He witnessed and chronicled some of the most important civil rights events from the 1960s onwards. He was the only reporter present when Martin Luther King Jr. was assassinated. Caldwell rose to fame as a reporter at The New York Times when he refused to disclose information to the FBI and the Nixon administration involving his sources in the Black Panther party. The case, United States v. Caldwell, reached the U.S. Supreme Court in 1972 when the court ruled against him. The "Caldwell Case" led to the enactment of shield laws in many states that allow reporters to protect sources and information. In addition to his work for The New York Times, Caldwell wrote for the New York Daily News.

Caldwell is a founding member of the steering committee of the Maynard Institute for Journalism Education, as well as the Washington-based Reporters Committee for Freedom of the Press. In 2009, he was inducted into the National Association of Black Journalists Hall of Fame.

== Early life and education ==
From Clearfield Pennsylvania, and as the youngest of six, Caldwell was strongly encouraged by his parents to pursue an education. His family often discussed the possibility of him becoming an educator, and his mother hoped he would become a minister.

Caldwell graduated from the University of Buffalo as a business major. He is a native of Clearfield, Pennsylvania, a predominantly white area, and it was not until attending school in Buffalo that he was surrounded by a larger Black population for the first time.

== Early career ==
Initially aspiring to become a sports journalist, Caldwell applied for a position in Harrisburg, Pennsylvania. Despite having been told he had secured the job, he was not contacted further. Caldwell later expressed in an interview that he believed racial discrimination might have played a role in the rejection. This experience contributed to his decision to shift from sports journalism to news writing, driven by a desire for greater opportunities and professional advancement. Caldwell's columns were very traditionally written, opting to report the news as he discovered it rather than presenting his views on events as they happened.

He went on to start his career at The Progress in Clearfield, Pennsylvania, then to work for the Intelligencer Journal in lancaster, Pennsylvania, in 1960, and the Democrat and Chronicle in Rochester, New York.

In 1964, friends of Caldwell successfully persuaded him to join the Democrat and Chronicle, where general manager Al Neuharth was actively working to break the color line at the Rochester newspaper. Caldwell was assigned to report on the 1964 Rochester race riot. He later worked with one of his favorite reporters, Jimmy Breslin, of the New York Herald Tribune. The two collaborated closely, reading and editing each other's work. Caldwell’s close association with Breslin eventually led to him receiving a position at the Herald Tribune. Caldwell then had a brief stint at The New York Post.

== Notable reporting work at The Times ==
Reporting for The New York Times, Caldwell went coast-to-coast to cover the riots that swept black America in the summers of 1967 and 1968. During the summer of 1967, in his first year at the paper, Caldwell worked alongside Gene Roberts to investigate the causes of the riots. Due to the volume and geographic spread of the uprisings, the two eventually divided their coverage.

In April 1968, he was the lone reporter to witness the assassination of Martin Luther King Jr. at the Lorraine Motel in Memphis, Tennessee. He also reported on the streets of Chicago in 1968, covering the riots as the police challenged demonstrators during the Democratic National Convention.

Caldwell covered the trial of Angela Davis, the controversial black scholar accused of a central role in the murder of a Marin County, California, judge during an escape attempt from San Quentin Prison. He also spent months in Atlanta covering the child murders and the subsequent trial of convicted killer Wayne Williams. In the late 1970s and early 1980s, Caldwell extensively covered incidents of police brutality and abuse in the judicial system while working in New York.

== Legal complications and press freedom ==
Assigned by The New York Times to cover the Black Panther Party from San Francisco, Caldwell was able to establish connections with key figures, including Kathleen and Eldridge Cleaver, which enabled him to develop extensive coverage and detailed files.

However, this proximity to the Panthers caused concern for Caldwell and his family. In an interview, he recalled, "And I used to pray, God, please let me get down those stairs, don't let anybody shoot me," when leaving Panther headquarters. Beyond the uncertainty of their trust, Caldwell's close association with the group made him a target of the Federal Bureau of Investigation (FBI), which would lead to a case drastically impacting the practice of journalism.

The central case in the United States Supreme Court's defining of reporters' rights was United States v. Caldwell in 1972, which became a part of Branzburg v. Hayes. This was based on Caldwell, then with The New York Times, refusing to appear before a federal grand jury and disclose confidential information involving his sources in the Black Panther Party. Initially, the FBI recruited Caldwell to become a spy on Black Panther activities. When he refused, the FBI demanded publicly that Caldwell honor a subpoena to question him in order to destroy his relationship with the Panthers. Caldwell's refusal led to the eventual Supreme Court ruling.

In the historic ruling, the United States Court of Appeals for the Ninth Circuit supported Caldwell's position. Later on, however, that decision was reversed. In an apparent conflict of interest, the deciding vote was cast by then Associate Justice William Rehnquist, who, as a U.S. Justice Department lawyer, had been intimately involved in the Caldwell case. As a result of the ruling, Caldwell destroyed years of files on the Panthers, which included written reactions and recorded conversations.

The ruling attracted significant media attention and prompted strong reactions from the journalistic community. Many prominent Black journalists publicly support Caldwell, both in defense of their colleague and in protection of journalists’ sources. A direct result of the demand that Caldwell testify before the grand jury was the founding of the Reporters Committee for Freedom of the Press in 1970. The organization, currently active, advocates for the protection of journalists’ First Amendment rights.

Following the ruling, The New York Times planned to reassign Caldwell from San Francisco to New York to cover the New York Knicks. Instead, he chose to resign and focus on writing his book Black American Witness, dedicated to his sister Joletta, which recounts his experiences as a journalist. Caldwell also developed a close friendship with former Supreme Court Justice Thurgood Marshall, and frequently visited him in Washington DC.

== Later career and legacy ==
Caldwell traveled the campaign trails with Rev. Jesse Jackson, during Jackson's historic run for the presidency in 1984, and with David Dinkins, during his mayoral election in the late 1980s. In Africa, Caldwell covered the fall of the white regime and election of the first black government in Zimbabwe.

Caldwell broke a barrier in New York City in 1979 when he became the first black journalist to write a regular column in a major daily newspaper, the New York Daily News. As a columnist, he mainly wrote about incidents concerning the Black community in New York. Topics ranged from police brutality, education, and the relationship between the Black community and the Jewish community. He also focused on international politics, specifically about struggles for liberation in Southern Africa, focusing specifically on Apartheid in South Africa. In April 1994, three years before the Abner Louima incident, he reported the story of six Haitian male cab drivers who came forward after being raped and sodomized by a police officer. The officer used his service revolver, uniform, and the police van for the attacks. The city did nothing. Caldwell was fired from the Daily News, and was afterward unable to find work in the mainstream press. During his time at the Daily News, Caldwell often spoke out against the mass media industry in the United States for discriminatory actions both in its portrayals and in its employment practices.

In the 1980s, Caldwell also wrote a featured piece in Ebony magazine in honor of his parents' 75th wedding anniversary. The article garnered national attention, prompting Pulitzer-Prize winning Moneta Sleet Jr. to travel to their small hometown to photograph the couple.

Caldwell is writer-in-residence at the Robert C. Maynard Institute for Journalism Education in Oakland, California, where he is writing The Caldwell Journals, a serialized account of the black journalist movement spawned by the 1960s civil rights movement. He previously served as the Scripps Howard Endowed Chair at Hampton University. Caldwell also taught a summer at Columbia University's school of journalism.

In addition to teaching, Caldwell has organized efforts to videotape/audiotape African-American journalists selected for an oral history collection.

== Recent activities ==
The Caldwell Chronicle radio program (Friday 4-6 p.m.) originates at WBAI (99.5 FM), the Pacifica radio outlet in New York, and can be heard live over the Internet (www.wbai.org).

As writer-in-residence at Hampton University, Virginia, in addition to teaching, Caldwell has organized efforts to videotape/audiotape African-American journalists selected for an oral history collection.

== Books ==
- Walker, Kenneth; Caldwell, Earl; Rackley, Lurma. Black American Witness: Reports from the Front (1994). Lion House Pub. ISBN 1-886446-10-5

== Sources ==
- Terry, Wallace. Missing Pages: Black Journalists of Modern America: An Oral History (2007), Carroll & Graf
- Moore, Jimmy Lee. Democracy, Race, and Privacy: The Hypocritical Failures of the United States
