= Free Flow of Information Act =

American proposed legal bill

The Free Flow of Information Act is a bill intended to provide a news reporter with the right to refuse to testify as to information or sources of information obtained during the newsgathering and dissemination process.

While numerous U.S. states have shield laws, the federal government has no such law. The bill is an effort to enact a shield law at the federal level.

The bill was introduced to the United States Senate by Sens. Richard Lugar and Chris Dodd in 2007. It was proposed in its current form by Sen. Arlen Specter.

In October 2007, the Free Flow of Information Act was passed by the United States House of Representatives. However, it was filibustered (failed cloture) on Jul 30, 2008, and withdrawn.

In the 2007-08 Senate version, it would not act as an unqualified immunity for journalists. Instead, federal judges would be allowed to declare certain news stories as having a public interest based on information obtained from confidential sources during the newsgathering process.

More than 50 media companies and organizations support the bill. The administration of President George W. Bush opposed it. Speaking to the Associated Press annual meeting in Washington, D.C., on April 14, 2008, Senator John McCain, the 2008 Republican nominee for president, said "Despite concerns I have about the legislation, I have narrowly decided to support it."

There are fears, however, that the act may be adopted in such a way as to exclude people who are not "professional" journalists, which would in turn serve to effectively shut down investigative reporting by small and independent media sources.

In July 2013 the White House was pushing for a federal media shield law, the Free Flow of Information Act, authored by U.S. Senators Charles Schumer and Lindsey Graham. Under the bill, the scope of protection for reporters would vary according to whether it was a civil case, an ordinary criminal case or a national security case. The greatest protection would be given to civil cases, in which litigants seeking to force reporters to testify or trying to obtain their calling information would be required to show why their need for the information outweighed the public's interest in unfettered news gathering. Ordinary criminal cases would work in a similar fashion, except the burden would be on the reporter seeking to quash the subpoena to show by a "clear and convincing" standard that the public interest in the free flow of information should prevail over the needs of law enforcement. Cases involving the disclosure of classified information would be more heavily tilted toward the government. Judges could not quash a subpoena through a balancing test if prosecutors presented facts showing that the information sought might help prevent a terrorist attack or other acts likely to harm national security. The legislation would create a presumption that when the government is seeking calling records from a telephone carrier, the news organization would be notified ahead of time, allowing it to fight the subpoena in court. But the bill would also allow the government to seek a 45- to 90-day delay in notification if a court determines that such notice would threaten the integrity of the investigation. The legislation would also include an exception where journalists could be subpoenaed if it means national security is at risk.
