= Reporter's privilege =

Reporter's privilege in the United States (also journalist's privilege, newsman's privilege, or press privilege), is a "reporter's protection under constitutional or statutory law, from being compelled to testify about confidential information or sources." It may be described in the US as the qualified (limited) First Amendment or statutory right many jurisdictions have given to journalists in protecting their confidential sources from discovery.

The First, Second, Third, Fifth, Eighth, Ninth, Tenth, Eleventh, and D.C. Circuits have all held that a qualified reporter's privilege exists. In the 2013 case U.S. v. Sterling, the Fourth expressly denied a reporter's privilege exists under Branzburg. Furthermore, 49 states and the District of Columbia have enacted statutes called shield laws protecting journalists' anonymous sources. Wyoming is the only state without a shield law, though the Reporters Committee for Freedom of the Press says this is likely because state courts rarely subpoena news organizations.

The United States federal government has not enacted any national reporters' privilege shield laws, but most of the 50 states do have shield laws or other protections for reporters.

== Shield laws ==
A shield law is a law that gives reporters protection against being forced to disclose confidential information or sources in state court. There is no federal shield law and state shield laws vary in scope. In general, however, a shield law aims to provide the protection of: "a reporter cannot be forced to reveal his or her source" Thus, a shield law provides a privilege to a reporter pursuant to which the reporter cannot be forced by a subpoena or other court order to testify about information contained in a news story and/or the source of that information. Several shield laws additionally provide protection for the reporter even if the source or information is revealed during the dissemination of the news story, that is whether or not the source or information is confidential. Depending on the jurisdiction, the privilege may be total or qualified, and it may also apply to other persons involved in the news-gathering and dissemination process as well, such as an editor or a publisher. However, shield laws do not ensure absolute protection.

=== Origins ===
The issue of whether or not journalists can be subpoenaed and forced to reveal confidential information arose in 1972 with the United States Supreme Court case Branzburg v. Hayes. Paul Branzburg was a reporter for The Courier-Journal in Louisville, Kentucky and wrote an article about the drug hashish. In creating the article, he came in contact with two local citizens who had created and used the drug. Because their activity was illegal, Branzburg promised the two individuals that he would not reveal their identities. After the article was published, Branzburg was subpoenaed by a local grand jury and ordered to reveal the identity of his sources. Branzburg refused and cited the provisions for freedom of the press from the First Amendment to the United States Constitution in his defense.

The Supreme Court decided in a five to four decision that the press did not have a Constitutional right of protection from revealing confidential information in court. The court acknowledged, however, that the government must "convincingly show a substantial relation between the information sought and a subject of overriding and compelling state interest." While this ruling did not set a precedent for journalistic rights in court, it did define a more stringent set of requirements for when a journalist could be subpoenaed in court.

This ruling was limited in nature, did not set a clear federal precedent regarding journalistic privileges from revealing confidential information, and thus has been interpreted and cited differently by courts over the years. The Third Circuit Court of Appeals, for instance, has gleaned a qualified First Amendment privilege from the Branzburg decision. In Riley v. City of Chester, the Court held that a reporter's right to protect his sources from disclosure could be overcome by a party who, by a preponderance of the evidence, demonstrated that he has made an effort to obtain the information elsewhere, that the only access to the information sought is through the journalist and his or her source, and that the information sought is crucial to the case. 612 F.2d 708 (3rd Cir. 1979).

=== By state ===
States differ on their approach to protecting reporter's privilege. As of 2018, 49 states and the District of Columbia offer some form of protections Forty states (plus D.C.) have passed shield laws. These laws vary from state to state. Some protections apply to civil but not to criminal proceedings. Other laws protect journalists from revealing confidential sources, but not other information. Many states have also established court precedents which provide protection to journalists, usually based on constitutional arguments. Only Wyoming lacks both legislation and judicial precedent to protect reporter's privilege.

Current protections for reporter's privilege in each state.
State	Shield law	Court-recognized privilege
Alabama	Yes	Yes
Alaska	Yes	Yes
Arizona	Yes	Yes
Arkansas	Yes	Yes
California	Yes	Yes
Colorado	Yes	No
Connecticut	Yes	Yes
District of Columbia	Yes	No
Delaware	Yes	Yes
Florida	Yes	Yes
Georgia	Yes	Yes
Hawaii	Yes	Yes
Idaho	Yes	Yes
Illinois	Yes	Yes
Indiana	Yes	Yes
Iowa	No	Yes
Kansas	Yes	Yes
Kentucky	Yes	No
Louisiana	Yes	Yes
Maine	Yes	Yes
Maryland	Yes	No
Massachusetts	No	Yes
Michigan	Yes	No
Minnesota	Yes	Yes
Mississippi	No	Yes
Missouri	No	Yes
Montana	Yes	No
Nebraska	Yes	No
Nevada	Yes	No
New Hampshire	No	Yes
New Jersey	Yes	No
New Mexico	Yes	No
New York	Yes	Yes
North Carolina	Yes	Yes
North Dakota	Yes	No
Ohio	Yes	Yes
Oklahoma	Yes	Yes
Oregon	Yes	No
Pennsylvania	Yes	Yes
Rhode Island	Yes	No
South Carolina	Yes	Yes
South Dakota	No	Yes
Tennessee	Yes	No
Texas	Yes	Yes
Utah	Yes	Yes
Vermont	Yes	Yes
Virginia	Yes	Yes
Washington	Yes	Yes
West Virginia	Yes	Yes
Wisconsin	Yes	Yes
Wyoming	No	No

=== Current issues ===
Proponents of shield laws argue that they ensure that news gatherers may do their jobs to their fullest ability and that they help avoid a dichotomy between state laws and journalistic ethics, but the differences between states' laws has raised questions regarding which laws apply where in regard to national reporting. Proponents argue that a federal shield law should exist to eliminate contradictions between state laws.

Opponents argue that shield laws afford extra privileges to journalists and that no citizen should be able to ignore a court ordered subpoena. Opponents also cite problems with defining who is considered a journalist or news gatherer and who is not, and note that if journalists get special protection from the government, then they are getting special journalistic benefits from the government instead of acting in complete independence. Some opponents also argue that journalists are often forced to testify by federal courts only in cases where a federal shield law likely would not protect them anyway. Finally, the federal government may not have constitutional right to enforce a shield law on state courts.

Many journalists, however, are subpoenaed to testify in criminal and civil cases for coverage of a variety of matters that do not involve questions of national security. In recent years, there have been bills for federal shield laws in the United States Congress; however, none of these bills have passed the Senate. A primary objection to recent efforts to pass a federal shield law has been concern about leaks of classified information, particularly given the modern potential of such leaks to be published globally on the Internet by non-traditional recipients, such as WikiLeaks, who might claim to be "journalists" under an unqualified shield law.

Sometimes, the press is not even immune from its sources, such as when the source wishes to remain anonymous and the journalist wishes to disclose it. Such was the case in Cohen v. Cowles Media Co. (1991). The Supreme Court upheld that a source may have a right to confidentiality if an agreement was made with the reporter. Unfortunately, the bigger issue of source disclosure gets even more confusing, since the Cohen and Branzburg decisions could allow for the possibility of a journalist being subpoenaed by a court to disclose the name of a source, and being sued by a source under promissory estoppel laws for that disclosure. The current laws of the land, and the gray areas of forecasting potential consequences of publishing a story with confidential sources places the press in a very precarious situation. The current shield laws in some states give the press somewhat of an upper hand. However, since federal law does not recognize reportorial privilege in most cases, it is understandable how the press might feel muzzled.

The shield law privilege may also be waived by a reporter, as the New Jersey Supreme Court recently found in the case of In re Michael G. Venezia. In that case, a New Jersey newspaper published an article containing defamatory statements about the plaintiff. The article attributed the statements to a source who was identified by name in the article; the source later denied making the defamatory statements. The plaintiff filed a defamation lawsuit against the newspaper, the reporter and the alleged source of the defamatory statements. When the plaintiff sought to question the newspaper reporter about the article, the reporter and his newspaper refused, claiming protection under New Jersey's shield law. It was discovered, however, that the reporter had already given a statement under oath concerning the article—and, most important, the alleged source of the statement and exactly what that source said—to a local county prosecutor's office. The reporter also talked about his source and what the source said with a local municipal attorney. The Venezia court unanimously held that, while New Jersey has arguably the most protective shield law in the United States, a reporter waives the privilege when he talks about his sources and information outside of the newsgathering process, as did the reporter in Venezia. The Venezia court stated: "The privilege holder is not permitted to step from behind the shield as he pleases, sallying forth one moment to make a disclosure to one person and then to seek the shield's protection from having to repeat the same disclosure to another person. A reporter cannot play peek-a-boo with the privilege." Thus, the Venezia court ordered that the reporter must submit to the plaintiff's deposition request. Venezia is highly significant because it marks the first time that a reporter has ever been found to have waived the privilege under New Jersey's current shield law, and because it explores the issue of what is or is not a "newsgathering activity," and, thus, what activities are subject to protection under the law.https://law.justia.com/cases/new-jersey/supreme-court/2007/a-63-05-doc.html#:~:text=As%20clearly%20established%20in%20our%20case%20law%2C,an%20article%20evaluating%20the%20performance%20of%20various

Currently, courts are struggling to define the standards for when shield laws should apply to non-traditional media outlets, particularly in the context of blogs and Internet publishing. In Obsidian Finance Group, LLC v. Cox, the United States District Court for the District of Oregon found that to qualify as a reporter, a standard of professionalism must be met, including but not limited to being associated with a traditional newsprint or television media outlet or obtaining a journalism degree. A subsequent opinion in the same case clarified that these were examples and not requirements; bloggers could qualify, and the denial of media status in the Cox case appears to have been largely motivated by the defendant reportedly offering to remove accusations for a substantial fee. Conversely, in The Mortgage Specialists, Inc. v. Implode-Explode Heavy Industries, Inc. the New Hampshire Supreme Court adopted a much broader definition of media that applies to blogs and website curators, reiterating that "freedom of the press is a fundamental personal right which is not confined to newspapers and periodicals."

In July 2013 the White House was pushing for a federal media shield law named the Free Flow of Information Act authored by U.S. Senators Charles Schumer and Lindsey Graham. Under the bill, the scope of protection for reporters would vary according to whether it was a civil case, an ordinary criminal case or a national security case. The greatest protection would be given to civil cases, in which litigants seeking to force reporters to testify or trying to obtain their calling information would be required to show why their need for the information outweighed the public's interest in unfettered news gathering. Ordinary criminal cases would work in a similar fashion, except the burden would be on the reporter seeking to quash the subpoena to show by a "clear and convincing" standard that the public interest in the free flow of information should prevail over the needs of law enforcement. Cases involving the disclosure of classified information would be more heavily tilted toward the government. Judges could not quash a subpoena through a balancing test if prosecutors presented facts showing that the information sought might help prevent a terrorist attack or other acts likely to harm national security. The legislation would create a presumption that when the government is seeking calling records from a telephone carrier, the news organization would be notified ahead of time, allowing it to fight the subpoena in court. But the bill would also allow the government to seek a 45- to 90-day delay in notification if a court determines that such notice would threaten the integrity of the investigation. The legislation would also include an exception where journalists could be subpoenaed if it means national security is at risk.

=== Congressional proposals ===
In 2004, two significant bills were introduced in the United States House of Representatives and in the United States Senate to create a federal shield law. The first bill was introduced in identical form in both the Senate and the House by Senator Richard Lugar (R-IN) and Representative Mike Pence (R-IN). Senator Christopher Dodd (D-CT) introduced separate legislation that created a seemingly broader protection than the Pence/Lugar bill.

In 2006, Rodney A. Smolla testified before the Senate Judiciary Committee on the topic of reporter's privilege.

The Protect Reporters from Exploitative State Spying Act (PRESS Act, S.2074) is a bipartisan federal shield law designed to protect journalist-source confidentiality, with exceptions for cases involving terrorism, serious emergencies, or journalists suspected of crimes. In January 2024, the U.S. House of Representatives passed the legislation unanimously. The bill broadly defines "covered journalist" to include anyone engaged in gathering, preparing, reporting, or publishing news or information of public interest, ensuring protection for both professional and unconventional journalists, as well as emerging outlets that may struggle against subpoenas. As of October 2024, it was awaiting consideration by the Senate Judiciary Committee, where it has bipartisan support, including three Republican sponsors. The bill has faced opposition from a small group of conservative senators, notably Tom Cotton (R-AR), who argue it could undermine law enforcement and national security.

=== Related issues ===
In recent years, a larger effort by journalists to press for federal shield laws formed following the Plame affair, in which reporters who released the name of Valerie Plame were asked who their sources were. One of the reporters, Judith Miller of The New York Times, was jailed for 85 days in 2005 for refusing to disclose her source in the government probe.

There is also a question about whether or not journalists should be exempt from national security laws.

== Department of Justice guidelines ==
The United States Department of Justice created self-imposed guidelines intended to protect journalists by regulating the use of subpoenas against the press. These guidelines state that the government "should have made all reasonable attempts to obtain the information from alternative, non-media sources” before considering issuing a subpoena to a member of the news media. Furthermore, the guidelines require that federal prosecutors negotiate with the press, explaining the specific needs of the case.

Before any subpoena may be issued, the attorney general must approve the issuance. The attorney general’s review for a subpoena to a member of the news media shall be based on the following criteria:

- In criminal cases, there should be reasonable grounds to believe, based on information obtained from non-media sources, that a crime has occurred, and that the information sought is essential to a successful investigation—particularly with reference to directly establishing guilt or innocence. The subpoena should not be used to obtain peripheral, nonessential, or speculative information.
- In civil cases there should be reasonable grounds, based on non-media sources, to believe that the information sought is essential to the successful completion of the litigation in a case of substantial importance. The subpoena should not be used to obtain peripheral, nonessential, or speculative information.
- The government should have unsuccessfully attempted to obtain the information from alternative non-media sources.
- The use of subpoenas to members of the news media should, except under exigent circumstances, be limited to the verification of published information and to such surrounding circumstances as relate to the accuracy of the published information.
- Even subpoena authorization requests for publicly disclosed information should be treated with care to avoid claims of harassment.
- Subpoenas should, wherever possible, be directed at material information regarding a limited subject matter, should cover a reasonably limited period of time, and should avoid requiring production of a large volume of unpublished material. They should give reasonable and timely notice of the demand for documents.

While these guidelines seem extremely protective of the press, they explicitly deny the creation of “any right or benefit, substantive or procedural, enforceable at law.” Nor does the policy have any substantive punishment for the federal government violations. If the federal prosecutors fail to obtain approval from the attorney general, the extent of the authorized punishment is “an administrative reprimand or other appropriate disciplinary action.” In fact, some courts have found that the guidelines “create no enforceable right.” Therefore, in circuits taking this approach, the news media have no right to appeal for enforcement of these policies before being compelled to testify.

== Judith Miller's attempted use of reporter's privilege ==
The issue of a reporter's privilege came to the forefront of media attention in the 2005 case In re Miller, involving reporters Judith Miller and Matthew Cooper. Miller and Cooper were both served with grand jury subpoenas for testimony and information, including notes and documents pertaining to conversations with specific and all other official sources relating to the Plame affair. Both refused to submit to the subpoenas, claiming a reporter’s privilege. The federal district court held both Miller and Cooper in civil contempt of court, and the United States Court of Appeals for the District of Columbia Circuit upheld the orders of contempt.

Miller and Cooper, in their appeal to the appellate court pleaded several defenses including a First Amendment reporter’s privilege and a common law reporter’s privilege. The appellate court rejected both the First Amendment and common law claims for privilege. The court held Miller and Cooper in civil contempt of court and sentenced both to eighteen months of jail time. The sentence was stayed pending an appeal to the U.S. Supreme Court.

However, the U.S. Supreme Court refused to hear the case. Judith Miller began serving the remaining four months of the original eighteen-month sentence on July 6, 2005. Matthew Cooper’s confidential source released him from their confidentiality agreement, so he chose to comply with the subpoena and agreed to testify before the grand jury.

== See also ==
- Branzburg v. Hayes
- Free Flow of Information Act
- In re Madden
- Jana Winter: Fox News reporter subpoenaed to reveal sources in 2013 despite Colorado shield law
- Josh Wolf* Privilege (evidence)
- Source protection
- State v. Rinaldo
- Subpoena duces tecum
- Von Bulow v. Von Bulow
