= California Shield Law =

The California Shield Law provides statutory and constitutional protections to journalists seeking to maintain the confidentiality of an unnamed source or unpublished information obtained during newsgathering. The shield law is currently codified in Article I, section 2(b) of the California Constitution and section 1070 of the Evidence Code. Section 1986.1 of the California Code of Civil Procedure (CCP) supplements these principal shield law provisions by providing additional safeguards to a reporter whose records are being subpoenaed.

== Provisions ==
The statutory and constitutional provisions provide virtually identical protections against contempt citations for journalists who refuse to disclose the identity of their sources or unpublished information acquired or prepared in the scope of their employment. Journalists covered by the shield law include not only newspaper reporters, but also those who work in other forms of press media including magazines, television, and radio. Unpublished information is defined as "information not disseminated to the public by the person from whom disclosure is sought, whether or not related information has been disseminated and includes, but is not limited to, all notes, outtakes, photographs, tapes or other data of whatever sort not itself disseminated to the public through a medium of communication, whether or not published information based upon or related to such material has been disseminated."

Section 1986.1 adds to the existing shield law framework by explaining that a journalist who testifies or provides other evidence in a civil or criminal proceeding does not waive the rights guaranteed by Article 1, section 2(b) of the California Constitution. The law also mandates the following requirements on the part of the party issuing the subpoena:

- Provide at least five days’ notice to a journalist who is being subpoenaed in any civil or criminal proceeding.
- Provide notice to the journalist and the journalist's employer of a subpoena issued to a third party who is in possession of the journalist's confidential information at least five days prior to issuing the subpoena.

== Legislative history ==
California passed its first shield law in 1935, where it was codified in section 1881(6) of the CCP. In its original iteration, the shield law protections only applied to newspaper publishers, editors, and reporters who refused to reveal their sources. The law's scope was extended in 1961 with an amendment to include radio, television station, press associations, and wire services employees.

In 1965, the shield law provisions were moved to section 1070 of the Evidence Code. Section 1070 has been amended three times in 1971, 1972, and 1974. One of the more consequential amendments was in 1974, when the statute was revised to also cover the disclosure of unpublished information in addition to sources.

=== Proposition 5 ===
On June 3, 1980, California voters approved the passage of Proposition 5, which incorporated the language of the existing shield law provision into the state constitution. The impetus for this constitutional amendment stemmed from concerns about how the shield law was being applied in practice, particularly in light of court opinions concluding that the provisions were incompatible under both the state and federal Constitution.

=== AB 1860 ===
Section 1986.1 of the CCP was introduced by Assembly member Carole Migden as AB 1860 during the 1999-2000 legislative session. According to Assembly member Migden, the intent of the bill was to clarify the existing statutory and constitutional safeguards guaranteed to journalists under the shield law. The bill was enrolled on August 29, 2000, and approved by the Governor on September 8, 2000.

=== SB 558 ===
During the 2013-2014 legislative session, state senator Ted Lieu introduced SB 558 to amend section 1986.1 of the CCP. Among the amendments made include the addition of subsection b(2), which mandated that in the case of a third party subpoena notice must be given to the journalist and the publisher at least five days prior to issuing the subpoena. According to senator Lieu, his intent was to ensure that parties could not take advantage of gaps or loopholes in the existing law to undermine journalists' rights. He also noted as a cautionary tale the 2013 scandal involving the United States Department of Justice secretly obtaining the records of the Associated Press without the organization's knowledge.

SB 558 was enrolled on September 10, 2013, and was approved by the Governor on October 3, 2013.

== Notable cases ==
=== Delaney v. Superior Court ===
The California Supreme Court held that the shield law's protection of unpublished information included reporters’ unpublished, nonconfidential eyewitness observations in a public place. However, the court went on to explain that the shield law immunity cannot be sustained if refusal to disclose information that is likely to be helpful to a criminal defendant would unduly infringe on that defendant's federal constitutional right to a fair trial.

=== Apple v. Does (O’Grady v. Superior Court) ===
Apple issued civil subpoenas to the publishers of online news sites that had published leaked information concerning Apple's secret plans for its new product. Here, the court concluded that the shield law protections did not differentiate between newsgathering for print or online media, thereby holding that the online publishers could not be held in contempt for refusing to divulge the identity of the sources who provided them with confidential information.

== See also ==
- Freedom of information law (California)
