= Branzburg v. Hayes =

- Supreme Court of the United States

Argued February 23, 1972 Decided June 29, 1972
- Full case name: Branzburg v. John P. Hayes, Judge, etc., et al.; In the Matter of Paul Pappas; United States v. Earl Caldwell
- Citations: 408 U.S. 665 (more) 92 S. Ct. 2646; 33 L. Ed. 2d 626; 1972 U.S. LEXIS 132; 24 Rad. Reg. 2d (P & F) 2125; 1 Media L. Rep. 2617

Case history
- Prior: Branzburg v. Pound, 461 S.W.2d 345 (Ky. 1970); cert. granted, 402 U.S. 942 (1971).; In re Pappas, 358 Mass. 604, 266 N.E.2d 297 (1971); cert. granted, 402 U.S. 942 (1971).; Application of Caldwell, 311 F. Supp. 358 (N.D. Cal. 1970); reversed sub nom., Caldwell v. United States, 434 F.2d 1081 (9th Cir. 1970); cert. granted, 402 U.S. 942 (1971).

Holding
- The First Amendment's protection of press freedom does not give the reporter's privilege in court.

Court membership
- Chief Justice Warren E. Burger Associate Justices William O. Douglas · William J. Brennan Jr. Potter Stewart · Byron White; Thurgood Marshall · Harry Blackmun; Lewis F. Powell Jr. · William Rehnquist

Case opinions
- Majority: White, joined by Burger, Blackmun, Powell, Rehnquist
- Concurrence: Powell
- Dissent: Douglas
- Dissent: Stewart, joined by Brennan, Marshall

Laws applied
- U.S. Const. amend. I; Ky. Rev. Stat. 421.100 (1962)

Branzburg v. Hayes, 408 U.S. 665 (1972), is a landmark decision of the US Supreme Court invalidating the use of the First Amendment as a defense for reporters summoned to testify before a grand jury. The case was argued February 23, 1972, and decided June 29 of the same year. The reporters lost their case by a vote of 5–4. This case is cited for the rule that in federal courts, a reporter may not generally avoid testifying in a criminal grand jury, and is one of a limited number of cases in which the U.S. Supreme Court has considered the use of reporters' privilege.

== Facts ==
Paul Branzburg of The (Louisville) Courier-Journal, in the course of his reporting duties, witnessed people manufacturing and using hashish. He wrote two articles concerning drug use in Kentucky. The first featured unidentified hands holding hashish, while the second included marijuana users as sources. These sources requested not to be identified. Both of the articles were brought to attention of law-enforcement personnel. Branzburg was subpoenaed before a grand jury for both of the articles. He was ordered to name his sources.

Earl Caldwell, a reporter for The New York Times, conducted extensive interviews with the leaders of The Black Panthers, and Paul Pappas, a Massachusetts television reporter, who also reported on The Black Panthers, spending several hours in their headquarters were similarly subpoenaed around the same time as was Paul Branzburg.

All three reporters were called to testify before separate grand juries about illegal actions they might have witnessed. They refused, citing a privilege under the Press Clause, and were held in contempt.

== Decision ==
In a fiercely-split decision, the Court ruled 5–4 against the existence of reportorial privilege in the Press Clause of the First Amendment. Writing for the majority, Justice Byron White declared that the petitioners were asking the Court "to grant newsmen a testimonial privilege that other citizens do not enjoy. This we decline to do." White acknowledged the argument that refusing to recognize such a privilege would undermine the ability of the press to gather news, but wrote that "from the beginning of the country the press has operated without constitutional protection for press informants, and the press has flourished."

He did not overlook the importance of a free press, however, and he established a test, citing Gibson v. Florida Legislative Investigation Comm., for deciding whether a reporter can be compelled to testify before a grand jury. For such a subpoena to have merit, the government must "convincingly show a substantial relation between the information sought and a subject of overriding and compelling state interest."

Complicating matters was Justice Lewis F. Powell's concurrence. While he sided with the majority, Powell emphasized the "limited nature" of the decision when he stated:

The asserted claim to privilege should be judged on its facts by the striking of a proper balance between freedom of the press and the obligation of all citizens to give relevant testimony with respect to criminal conduct. The balance of these vital constitutional and societal interests on a case-by-case basis accords with the tried and traditional way of adjudicating such questions.

A few days after oral argument, and before writing his concurrence, Powell prepared handwritten notes of the court's private conference to decide the disposition of the appeal. He stated in those notes:

I will make clear in an opinion... that there is a privilege analogous to an evidentiary one, which courts should recognize and apply on case by case to protect confidential information.... My vote turned on my conclusion... that we should not establish a constitutional privilege. (emphasis in original notes)

== Subsequent history ==
Powell's opinion has been interpreted by several lower courts as an indication that reportorial privilege exists but was simply not warranted in the specific case of Branzburg.

In Zerilli v. Smith the Court of Appeals for the D.C. Circuit concluded that the reporter's privilege existed and that its application depended on two factors: (1) that the information sought was crucial to a litigant's case and (2) that the information could not be acquired from any other source.

However, in 2003 in McKevitt v. Pallasch, Judge Posner reaffirmed the majority's opinion in Branzburg in a case concerning a refusal to stay an order, in a terrorism case in Ireland, to subpoena recordings of a key witness possessed by a group of journalists. Posner used the case-by-case balancing test envisioned by Justice Powell, writing:

The federal interest in cooperating in the criminal proceedings of friendly foreign nations is obvious; and it is likewise obvious that newsgathering and reporting activities of the press are inhibited when a reporter cannot assure a confidential source of confidentiality. Yet that was Branzburg and it is evident from the result in that case that the interest of the press in maintaining the confidentiality of sources is not absolute. There is no conceivable interest in confidentiality in the present case.

In July 2004, Branzburg was cited as precedent by United States District Court Chief Judge Thomas Hogan in a memorandum opinion denying a motion to quash two grand jury subpoenas issued to reporters. NBC Washington Bureau Chief Tim Russert and Time magazine reporter Matthew Cooper challenged the subpoenas issued in connection with the leak of the identity of former CIA operative Valerie Plame, citing their First Amendment rights as reason not to reveal their confidential sources. In the opinion, Hogan wrote:

Because this Court holds that the U.S. Supreme Court unequivocally rejected any reporter’s privilege rooted in the First Amendment or common law in the context of a grand jury acting in good faith, this Court denies the motions to quash.

Civil cases, as opposed to criminal cases, have been held not to come under the Branzburg test.

In 2007, the New York Times published Justice Powell's notes of the court's private conference on a form that looks like a scorecard. The Times purports that Justice Powell wrote the following:

I will make clear in an opinion – unless the court's opinion is clear – that there is a privilege analogous to an evidentiary one, which courts should recognize and apply on case by case to protect confidential information. My vote turned on my conclusion – after hearing arguments of counsel and re-reading principal briefs – that we should not establish a constitutional privilege. If we did this, the problems that would flow from it would be difficult to foresee: e.g., applying a privilege of const. dimensions – to grand jurys, petite juries, congressional committees, etc... And who are "newsmen" – how to define?

== Quotes ==
Persuading the Court to grant First Amendment protection to journalists regarding their sources was obviously going to be a hard sell. Notwithstanding the strong policy arguments in favor of establishing this privilege and the serious harm that would be caused by its absence, no such protection had ever been held to exist. Not only was the concept that the judicial system was entitled to 'every man's evidence' itself deeply rooted in the Constitution, but merely determining the scope of the privilege (when would it apply?) and identifying who would receive it (only regularly employed journalists? freelancers? anyone?) were difficult matters at best.--Floyd Abrams

== See also ==
- List of United States Supreme Court cases, volume 408
- Free Flow of Information Act
- Reporter's privilege
- Reporters' privilege shield laws in the United States
- In the film Nothing But the Truth, Branzburg v. Hayes case is quoted and discussed.
- In the television series The Newsroom, the case is cited and discussed in relation to the Federal government's subpoena to news anchor Will McAvoy to reveal a source. ("Contempt", Season 3)
