= Freedom of speech in the United States =

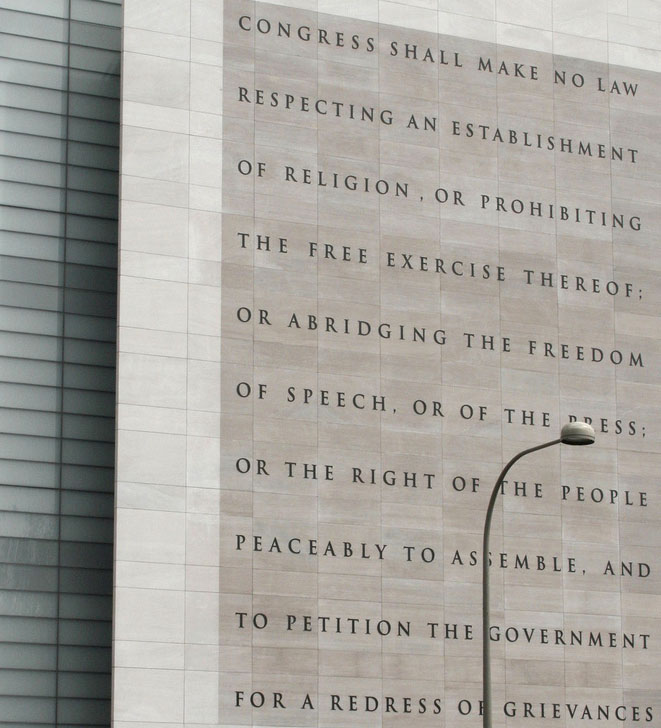
The Newseum's five freedoms guaranteed by the First Amendment to the U.S. Constitution

In the United States, freedom of speech is strongly protected from government restrictions by the First Amendment to the United States Constitution, many state constitutions, and state and federal laws. Freedom of speech, also called free speech, means the free and public expression of opinions without censorship, interference and restraint by the government. The term "freedom of speech" embedded in the First Amendment encompasses the decision of what to say as well as what not to say. The freedom of speech right not only proscribes most government restrictions on the content of speech and ability to speak, but also protects the right to receive information, prohibits most government restrictions or burdens that discriminate between speakers, restricts the tort liability of individuals for certain speech, and prevents the government from requiring individuals and corporations to speak or finance certain types of speech with which they do not agree.

The Supreme Court of the United States has also recognized several categories of speech that are given lesser or no protection by the First Amendment and has recognized that governments may enact reasonable time, place, or manner restrictions on speech. The First Amendment's constitutional right of free speech, which is applicable to state and local governments under the incorporation doctrine, prevents only government restrictions on speech, not restrictions imposed by private individuals or businesses unless they are acting on behalf of the government. Some laws may restrict the ability of private businesses and individuals from restricting the speech of others, such as employment laws that restrict employers' ability to prevent employees from disclosing their salary to coworkers or attempting to organize a labor union.

Categories of speech that are given lesser or no protection by the First Amendment include obscenity (as determined by the Miller test), fraud, child pornography, speech integral to illegal conduct, speech that incites imminent lawless action, and regulation of commercial speech such as advertising. Within these limited areas, other limitations on free speech balance rights to free speech and other rights, such as rights for authors over their works (copyright), protection from imminent or potential violence against particular persons, restrictions on the use of untruths to harm others (slander and libel), and communications while a person is in prison. When a speech restriction is challenged in court, it is generally presumed invalid and the government bears the burden of convincing the court that the restriction is constitutional.

== History ==
=== England ===
During colonial times, English speech regulations were rather restrictive. The English criminal common law of seditious libel made criticizing the government a crime. Lord Chief Justice John Holt, writing in 1704–1705, explained the rationale for the prohibition: "For it is very necessary for all governments that the people should have a good opinion of it." The objective truth of a statement in violation of the libel law was not a defense.

Until 1694, England had an elaborate system of licensing; no publication was allowed without the accompaniment of the government-granted license.

=== Colonies ===
The colonies originally had very different views on the protection of free speech. During English colonialism in America, there were fewer prosecutions for seditious libel than England, but other controls over dissident speech existed.

The most stringent controls on speech in the colonial period were controls that outlawed or otherwise censored speech that was considered blasphemous in a religious sense. A 1646 Massachusetts law, for example, punished persons who denied the immortality of the soul. In 1612, a Virginia governor declared the death penalty for a person that denied the Trinity under Virginia's Laws Divine, Moral and Martial, which also outlawed blasphemy, speaking badly of ministers and royalty, and "disgraceful words".

More recent scholarship, focusing on seditious speech in the 17th-century colonies (when there was no press), has shown that from 1607 to 1700 the colonists' freedom of speech expanded dramatically, laying a foundation for the political dissent that flowered among the Revolutionary generation.

The trial of John Peter Zenger in 1735 was a seditious libel prosecution for Zenger's publication of criticisms of the Governor of New York, William Cosby. Andrew Hamilton represented Zenger and argued that truth should be a defense to the crime of seditious libel, but the court rejected this argument. Hamilton persuaded the jury, however, to disregard the law and to acquit Zenger. The case is considered a victory for freedom of speech as well as a prime example of jury nullification. The case marked the beginning of a trend of greater acceptance and tolerance of free speech.

=== First Amendment ratification ===
In the 1780s after the American Revolutionary War, debate over the adoption of a new Constitution resulted in a division between Federalists, such as Alexander Hamilton who favored a strong federal government, and Anti-Federalists, such as Thomas Jefferson and Patrick Henry who favored a weaker federal government.

During and after the Constitution ratification process, Anti-Federalists and state legislatures expressed concern that the new Constitution placed too much emphasis on the power of the federal government. The drafting and eventual adoption of the Bill of Rights, including the First Amendment, was, in large part, a result of these concerns, as the Bill of Rights limited the power of the federal government.

=== Alien and Sedition Acts ===
In 1798, Congress, which contained several of the ratifiers of the First Amendment at the time, adopted the Alien and Sedition Acts. The laws prohibited the publication of "false, scandalous, and malicious writings against the government of the United States, or either house of the Congress of the United States, or the President of the United States, with intent to defame ... or to bring them ... into contempt or disrepute; or to excite against them ... hatred of the good people of the United States, or to stir up sedition within the United States, or to excite any unlawful combinations therein, for opposing or resisting any law of the United States, or any act of the President of the United States".

The law did allow truth as a defense and required proof of malicious intent. The 1798 Act nevertheless made ascertainment of the intent of the framers regarding the First Amendment somewhat difficult, as some of the members of Congress that supported the adoption of the First Amendment also voted to adopt the 1798 Act. The Federalists under President John Adams aggressively used the law against their rivals, the Democratic-Republicans. The Alien and Sedition Acts were a major political issue in the 1800 election, and after he was elected President, Thomas Jefferson pardoned those who had been convicted under the Act. The Act expired and the Supreme Court never ruled on its constitutionality.

In New York Times v. Sullivan, the Court declared "Although the Sedition Act was never tested in this Court, the attack upon its validity has carried the day in the court of history." 376 U.S. 254, 276 (1964).

=== Censorship era ===
From the late 1800s to the mid-1900s, various laws restricted speech in ways that are today not allowed, mainly due to societal norms. Possibly inspired by foul language and the widely available pornography he encountered during the American Civil War, Anthony Comstock advocated for government suppression of speech that offended Victorian morality. He convinced the government of New York State to create the New York Society for the Suppression of Vice, in 1873, and inspired the creation of the Watch and Ward Society in Boston in 1878. City and state governments monitored newspapers, books, theater, comedy acts, and films for offensive content, and enforced laws with arrests, impoundment of materials, and fines. The Comstock laws passed by Congress (and related state laws) prohibited sending materials through the U.S. mail that included pornography; information about contraception, abortion, and sex toys; and personal letters mentioning sexual activities. Regulation of American film by state and local governments was supplemented by the Motion Picture Production Code from to 1930 to 1968, in an industry effort to preempt federal regulation. The similar industry-backed Comics Code Authority lasted from 1954 to 2011.

Some laws were motivated not by morality, but concerns over national security. The Office of Censorship suppressed communication of information of military importance during World War II, including by journalists and all correspondence going into or out of the United States. McCarthyism from the 1940s to the 1950s resulted in the suppression of advocacy of Communism, and the Hollywood blacklist. This included some prosecutions under the Smith Act of 1940.

=== Modern view ===
As a result of the jurisprudence of the Warren Court in the mid-to-late 20th century, the Court has moved towards a baseline default rule under which freedom of speech is generally presumed to be protected, unless a specific exception applies. Therefore, apart from certain narrow exceptions, the government normally cannot regulate the content of speech. In 1971, in Cohen v. California, Justice John Marshall Harlan II, citing Whitney v. California, emphasized that the First Amendment operates to protect the inviolability of "a marketplace of ideas", while Associate Justice Thurgood Marshall cogently explained in 1972 that:

[A]bove all else, the First Amendment means that government has no power to restrict expression because of its message, its ideas, its subject matter, or its content. [Citations.] To permit the continued building of our politics and culture, and to assure self-fulfillment for each individual, our people are guaranteed the right to express any thought, free from government censorship. The essence of this forbidden censorship is content control. Any restriction on expressive activity because of its content would completely undercut the 'profound national commitment to the principle that debate on public issues should be uninhibited, robust, and wide-open.' [Citation.]

== Types of speech ==
=== Core political speech ===
Core political speech is the discussion of political matters, including commentary on governmental laws and policies, discussion of public issues which may be subject to governmental action, commentary on political parties, individual politicians, political candidates and so on. This includes the right to publicly criticize the government and its leaders, potentially in very harsh or offensive terms. Core political speech is the most highly guarded form of speech because of its importance to a functional republic. In Buckley v. Valeo, for instance, the Supreme Court wrote:

Discussion of public issues and debate on the qualifications of candidates are integral to the operation of the system of government established by our Constitution. The First Amendment affords the broadest protection to such political expression in order 'to assure (the) unfettered interchange of ideas for the bringing about of political and social changes desired by the people.'

Restrictions placed upon core political speech must weather strict scrutiny analysis or they will be struck down. The Supreme Court has ruled that suffrage itself is not political "speech" and thus can be subjected to significant regulations, and the right to run for office may likewise be restricted. Calling for such restrictions to be altered or abolished, however, is protected under the First Amendment, and certain kinds of suffrage restrictions are already prohibited by other parts of the constitution. In First National Bank of Boston v. Bellotti (1978), the Supreme Court protected corporate expenditure of money as a form of speech.

=== Commercial speech ===
Not wholly outside the protection of the First Amendment is commercial speech, which is speech that "propose[s] a commercial transaction", as defined by Ohralik v. Ohio State Bar Assn. in 1978. Such speech still has expressive value although it is being uttered in a marketplace ordinarily regulated by the state. In 1980, Central Hudson Gas & Electric Corp. v. Public Service Commission held that restrictions of commercial speech are subject to a four-element intermediate scrutiny. Sorrell v. IMS Health Inc. (2011) casts doubt upon whether commercial speech still exists as a distinct type of speech subject to less protection than other categories of speech.

=== Expressive conduct ===
Expressive conduct, also called "symbolic speech" or "speech acts," is nonverbal conduct that intends to communicate a message. Examples include creating or destroying an object when performed as a statement (such as flag burning in a political protest), silent marches and parades intended to convey a message, clothing bearing meaningful symbols (such as anti-war armbands), body language, messages written in code, ideas and structures embodied as computer code ("software"), mathematical and scientific formulae, and illocutionary acts that convey by implication an attitude, request, or opinion.

Expressive conduct is recognized by federal court decisions as being protected under the First Amendment as a form of speech, although this is not expressly written as such in the document.

For example, seen in light of the First Amendment, computer code is a way to speak about how a problem is solved, using the precise terms a computer might be given as directions, and flag burning is a way to speak or express forcefully of one's views opposing the acts or political position of the relevant country. Significantly, the possibility exists for a single speech act to be protected or not depending upon context and intention. For example, there may be a First Amendment distinction between burning a flag in protest and the same act performed as mere wanton vandalism.

=== Vague and meaningless speech ===
Some expressions have an ambiguous, difficult to articulate, unintended, or indiscernible meaning. These include instrumental music, abstract art, and nonsense. These are generally included in protected "speech", but some of the justifications for doing so do not apply. In the 1995 decision Hurley v. Irish-American Gay, Lesbian, and Bisexual Group of Boston, the U.S. Supreme Court affirmed that the art of Jackson Pollock, the expressionist music of Arnold Schoenberg, and the semi-nonsense poem "Jabberwocky" are protected. This stands in contrast to, for example, Nazi Germany, which banned what it called "degenerate art" and "degenerate music".

In the 2010 decision Kleinman v. City of San Marcos, the U.S. Fifth Circuit noted a number of cases where artistic expressive elements were mixed with non-speech elements (such as an artistically painted junked car or clothing decorated with graffiti art). In each case, the courts chose to apply full First Amendment protection, but used intermediate scrutiny and upheld the content-neutral government regulations at issue (e.g. no junked cars displayed on public roads, time and place restrictions on sidewalk vendors).

In the case Morse v. Frederick, the defendant claimed the slogan "BONG HiTS 4 JESUS" intended to provoke amusement or disgust but not advocate anything, but the Supreme Court ruled it could be punished under the school speech doctrine because a reasonable person could interpret it as advocating illegal drug use (which was against school policy).

== Types of speech restrictions ==
The Supreme Court has recognized several different types of laws that restrict speech, and subjects each type of law to a different level of scrutiny.

=== Content-based restrictions ===
Content-based restrictions "are presumptively unconstitutional regardless of the government's benign motive, content-neutral justification, or lack of animus toward the ideas contained in the regulated speech." Restrictions that require examining the content of speech to be applied must pass strict scrutiny.

Content-based restrictions can either discriminate based on viewpoint or subject matter. An example of a law regulating the subject matter of speech would be a city ordinance that forbids all picketing in front of a school except for labor picketing. This law would amount to subject matter discrimination because it favors one subject over another in deciding who it will allow to speak. An example of a law that regulates a speaker's viewpoint would be a policy of a government official who permitted opponents of abortion to speak on government property but banned proponents of legal abortion care because of their views would be engaged in "viewpoint discrimination". Restrictions that apply to certain viewpoints but not others face the highest level of scrutiny, and are usually overturned, unless they fall into one of the court's special exceptions. An example of this is found in the United States Supreme Court's decision in Legal Services Corp. v. Velazquez in 2001. In this case, the Court held that government subsidies cannot be used to discriminate against a specific instance of viewpoint advocacy.

The Court pointed out in Snyder v. Phelps (2011) that one way to ascertain whether a restriction is content-based versus content-neutral is to consider if the speaker had delivered a different message under exactly the same circumstances: "A group of parishioners standing at the very spot where Westboro stood, holding signs that said 'God Bless America' and 'God Loves You,' would not have been subjected to liability. It was what Westboro said that exposed it to tort damages."

=== Time, place, and manner restrictions ===
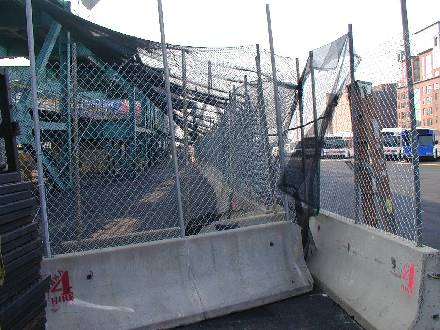
The free speech zone at the 2004 Democratic National Convention

Grayned v. City of Rockford (1972) summarized the time, place, manner concept: "The crucial question is whether the manner of expression is basically incompatible with the normal activity of a particular place at a particular time." Time, place, and manner restrictions must withstand intermediate scrutiny. Note that any regulations that would force speakers to change how or what they say do not fall into this category (so the government cannot restrict one medium even if it leaves open another). Heffron v. International Society for Krishna Consciousnesss (1981), the first case to apply the four-part test used today, held that time, place, or manner restrictions must:

- Be content neutral
- Be narrowly tailored
- Serve a significant governmental interest
- Leave open ample alternative channels for communication

Freedom of speech is also sometimes limited to so-called free speech zones, which can take the form of a wire fence enclosure, barricades, or an alternative venue designed to segregate speakers according to the content of their message. There is much controversy surrounding the creation of these areas – the mere existence of such zones is offensive to some people, who maintain that the First Amendment makes the entire country an unrestricted free speech zone. Civil libertarians often claim that Free Speech Zones are used as a form of censorship and public relations management to conceal the existence of popular opposition from the mass public and elected officials.

==== Definition and early history ====
Time, place, and manner restrictions refer to a legal doctrine enforced under the United States Constitution and Supreme Court. The Merriam-Webster Dictionary defines time, place, and manner restrictions as "[A] restriction on the time, place, or manner of expression that is justified when it is neutral as to content and serves a significant government interest and leaves open ample alternative channels of communication. The goal of time, place and manner restrictions is to regulate speech in a way that still protects freedom of speech.

While freedom of speech is considered by the United States to be a fundamental right, it is not absolute, and therefore subject to restrictions. Time, place, and manner restrictions are relatively self-explanatory. Time restrictions regulate when expression can take place; place restrictions regulate where expression can take place; and manner restrictions regulate how expression can take place. A restriction may occur if someone is protesting loudly in front of someone's house in a neighborhood in the middle of the night, or if someone was sitting in the middle of a busy intersection during rush hour, for example. These actions would cause problems for other people, so restricting speech in terms of time, place, and manner addresses a legitimate societal concern. Restricting this speech would be constitutional because the restrictions are content neutral, meaning they would restrict anyone from saying anything in these situations, no matter what their message is; they are narrowly drawn, meaning the restriction was examined specifically for the case in question to determine how to serve the governmental interest at stake; the restrictions serve a significant governmental interest, meaning other fundamental rights are important to citizens, such as sleeping peacefully at night or people getting to work or home from work; and there are plenty of alternative methods of communicating their message, such as writing an editorial in the paper or moving to the sidewalk at a different time in the day.

One of the earliest mentions of the principle of time, place, and manner restrictions comes in the Cox v. New Hampshire (1941) case. Justice Charles Evans Hughes, writing for a unanimous court, stated: "Civil liberties, as guaranteed by the Constitution, imply the existence of an organized society maintaining public order without which liberty itself would be lost in the excesses of unrestrained abuses. The authority of a municipality to impose regulations.. has never been regarded as inconsistent with civil liberties, but, rather, as one of the means of safeguarding the good order upon which they ultimately depend." This case was the first major Supreme Court case upholding significant time, place, and manner restrictions.

==== Time, place, and manner restrictions and the First Amendment ====
The First Amendment of the United States Constitution declares that "Congress shall make no law respecting an establishment of religion, or prohibiting the free exercise thereof; or abridging the freedom of speech, or of the press; or the right of the people peaceably to assemble, and to petition the Government for a redress of grievances." It is easy to mistakenly interpret the First Amendment as granting people the right to say whatever they want, whenever, and wherever they want. However, the United States Supreme Court has interpreted that the First Amendment was never intended to provide such power, because it does not protect speech at all times and in all places. The Court has consistently ruled that the government has the power to impose limits on free speech in regard to its time, place, and manner of delivery. As noted in Clark v. Community for Creative Non-Violence (1984), "... [time, place, and manner] restrictions ... are valid provided that they are justified without reference to the content of the regulated speech, that they are narrowly tailored to serve a significant governmental interest, and that they leave open ample alternative channels for communication of the information." These restrictions are proved constitutional time and time again, in many Supreme Court cases. It is important to understand the limits to the protection of freedom of speech by learning about time, place, and manner restrictions.

==== Public forum doctrine ====
Time, place, and manner restrictions are often linked with the public forum doctrine. The Supreme Court has established three types of forums: traditional public forums, designated forums, and nonpublic forums.

Traditional public forums include public areas, such as parks and sidewalks. These areas have the strongest protections under the First Amendment. Although, traditional public forums are still subject to traditional time, place, and manner restrictions, meaning restrictions must be content-neutral, serve a significant governmental interest, and allow for ample alternatives. As noted in United States Postal Service v. Council of Greenburgh Civic Associations (1981), "The First Amendment does not guarantee access to property simply because it is owned or controlled by the government." Justice Marshall in Grayned v. City of Rockford (1972), also noted something similar, saying "The crucial question is whether the manner of expression is basically compatible with the normal activity of a particular place at a particular time." The power of restriction has been seen in many cases, such as in The City of Chicago v. Alexander (2014) case when the Occupy movement was restricted because the park was closed and they were not allowed to protest there during that time. Nevertheless, speech cannot be discriminated against because of the views of the speaker, or the content of their speech. These are generally called View-Point and Content-Based Limitations. Some people argue that time, place, and manner restrictions are relied on too heavily by free speech doctrine, resulting in less free speech allowed in public forums. This view is highly contested. Other people, such as Justice Pierce, who delivered the opinion in The City of Chicago v. Alexander (2014), argue restrictions are only meant to defer speech, in order to limit problems that are put on society.

A designated forum is usually public property the government opens for public expression, such as theatres and state schools. The difference between traditional public forums and designated public forums is in a designated public forum the government may limit access to the area to only certain groups, speakers, or subjects, so long as their rules are consistent. Designated public forums are subject to the same restrictions as traditional public forums, meaning the time, place, and manner restrictions must be content-neutral, serve a governmental interest, and allow ample alternatives. Restrictions in a designated forum can be seen in cases such as Widmar v. Vincent (1981) and City of Madison Joint School District v. Wisconsin PERC (1976).

Nonpublic forums include airport terminals and internal mail systems. In these areas the government has significant control over the speech they allow in these forums because the government acts like a private owner here. This means the government may restrict any speech, as long as the restrictions are reasonable, and do not come in to play because a public official wants the speech restricted. Therefore, content may be restricted because of the subject or the speaker. However, the restrictions must align with the purpose of the area and be viewpoint neutral. This doctrine has been applied to cases such as Perry Education Association v. Perry Local Educators' Association (1983) and Hazelwood School District v. Kuhlmeier (1988).

==== Time, place, and manner restrictions in Supreme Court decisions ====
Time, place, and manner restrictions are intended to allow convenience and order to prevail. Some examples of time, place, and manner cases include: Grayned v. Rockford (1972), Heffron v. International Society for Krishna Consciousness, Inc. (1981), Madsen v. Women's Health Center, Inc., 512 U.S. 753 (1994), and Hill v. Colorado, 530 U.S. 703 (2000). Most time, place, and manner cases involve the government as one of the parties in the case.

Because time, place, and manner restrictions put value on convenience and order, there is certain behavior that is not permitted. For example, you cannot yell "fire" in a crowded place when there is no fire. This action would cause an uproar of chaos, and has the potential to cause immediate harm to others. For those reasons, this action would not qualify as a protected right under the First Amendment. As Justice Holmes put it in Schenck v. United States (1918), "Even the most stringent protection of free speech would not protect a man in falsely shouting fire in a theatre and causing panic." While free speech is important in our society, there are other values in our society that are equally important, such as public order and public peace. The role of time, place, and manner restrictions are balanced with conflicting values in our society.

It is important to understand how judges and other governmental entities decide what speech to limit in regard to time, place, and manner. As previously stated, in order for the Supreme Court and other governmental entities to impose time, place, and manner restrictions, they must decide that the restrictions are content neutral, narrowly tailored, serve a significant governmental interest, and allow other alternative methods of communication. If the restrictions can pass these four requirements, they will align with the First Amendment restriction provisions. Of course, these restrictions will vary from case to case. Ideally, suppressing speech is considered wrong, but in some cases, it is necessary to restrict speech for the greater good of society. It must be decided that the speech is a nuisance in regard to its time, place, or manner of delivery, such as creating a clear and present danger. If there is a problem with the time, place, or manner of delivery of the speech, Congress has the right to limit such speech.

==== Recent time, place, and manner case: Chicago v. Alexander ====
As noted in The City of Chicago v. Alexander (2014), "The [F]irst [A]mendment does not guarantee the right to communicate one's views at all times and places or in any manner that may be desired. A state may therefore impose reasonable restrictions on the time, place or manner of constitutionally protected speech occurring in a public forum." It is permitted to restrict speech in terms of time, place, and manner, so long as there are ample alternatives available. The ample alternative provision can cause confusion for those trying to understand time, place, and manner restrictions. What qualifies as an acceptable alternative? An alternative does not need to be the first choice of a way to communicate, nor does it need to be the same method of communication. That is, if the original method of communication was vocal, an acceptable alternative could be written. In fact, an ample alternative does not even have to reach the same audience as the original speech. In the case of The City of Chicago v. Alexander (2014), an ample alternative to protesting in Grant Park after hours could have been to protest on the sidewalk across the street, or to protest in the morning in the park when it reopened. It is important to remember that time, place, and manner restrictions are not intended to restrict the content of what is being said, instead they restrict when, where, or how the message is being communicated.

As The City of Chicago v. Alexander (2014) case pointed out, in United States v. O'Brien (1968) the court created a test for the content neutral provision. The O'Brien (1968) court declared, "... a government regulation is sufficiently justified if it is within the constitutional power of the Government; if it furthers an important or substantial governmental interest; if the governmental interest is unrelated to the suppression of free expression; and if the incidental restriction on alleged First Amendment freedoms is not greater than is essential to the furtherance of that interest.[33]" Content neutrality is an essential provision to meet because if a law lacks content neutrality due to targeting a particular viewpoint or means of expression, it will often violate other constitutional principles, such as the equal protection clause.[34] Expressing content neutrality is essential in successfully limiting speech through time, place, and manner restrictions in a public forum.

=== Incidental burdens on speech ===
See United States v. O'Brien.

=== Prior restraint ===
If the government tries to restrain speech before it is spoken, as opposed to punishing it afterwards, it must be able to show that punishment after the fact is not a sufficient remedy, and show that allowing the speech would "surely result in direct, immediate, and irreparable damage to our Nation and its people" (New York Times Co. v. United States). U.S. courts have not permitted most prior restraints since the case of Near v. Minnesota in 1931. However, the 1988 case of Hazelwood v. Kuhlmeier was argued to be a means of prior restraint due to a school principal eliminating content and topics from the school newspaper that was written by students at Hazelwood East High School in St. Louis, Missouri. The U.S. Supreme Court deemed the school was not in violation of students' first amendment rights because the paper was sponsored by the school that upheld rules and regulations about inappropriate articles.

A recent example of prior restraint litigation occurred in 2025 when author Toni Marek became involved in Marek v. Phi Theta Kappa after Phi Theta Kappa sought a temporary restraining order preventing distribution of her manuscript. A Texas court initially granted the order on an ex parte basis but later dissolved it and denied a request for a temporary injunction following a hearing.

== Exclusions ==
=== Falsehoods ===
Laws against commercial fraud, counterfeit currency, and perjury have been upheld within certain limits, but false statements of fact are generally protected. In United States v. Alvarez, the majority opinion stated "[t]he Government has not demonstrated that false statements generally should constitute a new category of unprotected speech... Permitting the government to decree this speech to be a criminal offense, whether shouted from the rooftops or made in a barely audible whisper, would endorse government authority to compile a list of subjects about which false statements are punishable. That governmental power has no clear limiting principle."

- 18 U.S.C. § 1038 (False information and hoaxes)

This law makes it a federal crime to knowingly convey false or misleading information about certain serious crimes or attacks, including biological attacks, under circumstances where the information could reasonably be believed.

=== Inciting imminent lawless action ===
Speech that incites imminent lawless action was originally banned under the weaker clear and present danger test established by Schenck v. United States, but this test has since been overturned by the imminent lawless action test established in Brandenburg v. Ohio.

=== Fighting words ===
Inflammatory words that are either injurious by themselves or might cause the hearer to immediately retaliate or breach the peace. Use of such words is not necessarily protected "free speech" under the First Amendment.

=== True threats ===
See Watts v. United States, Virginia v. Black.

=== Obscenity ===
Obscenity, defined by the Miller test by applying contemporary community standards, is a type of speech which is not legally protected. It is speech to which all the following apply: appeals to the prurient interest, depicts or describes sexual conduct in a patently offensive way, and lacks serious literary, artistic, political, or scientific value. (This is usually applied to more hard-core forms of pornography.)

The 1998 Anti-Obscenity Enforcement Act in Alabama applies to sex toys. The similar 1973 Texas obscenity statute (updated in 2003) was declared unconstitutional in 2008.

==== Child pornography ====
See New York v. Ferber.

=== Torts ===
==== Defamation ====
Limits placed on libel and slander attach civil liability and have been upheld by the Supreme Court. The Court narrowed the definition of libel with the case of Hustler Magazine v. Falwell made famous in the movie The People vs. Larry Flynt. New York Times Co. v. Sullivan established the actual malice standard, a high bar for public figure plaintiffs. Making false statements in "matters within the jurisdiction" of the federal government is also a crime.

==== Invasion of privacy ====
See Time, Inc. v. Hill.

==== Intentional infliction of emotional distress ====
See Hustler Magazine v. Falwell, Texas v. Johnson.

=== Political spending ===
==== Campaign contributions ====
See Buckley v. Valeo and McCutcheon v. Federal Election Commission.

==== Independent political expenditures ====
See Citizens United v. Federal Election Commission and SpeechNow.org v. FEC

=== Government speech ===
The government speech doctrine establishes that the government may censor speech when the speech is its own, leading to a number of contentious decisions on its breadth.

=== Public employee speech ===
Statements made by public employees pursuant to their official duties are not protected by the First Amendment from employer discipline as per the case of Garcetti v. Ceballos. This applies also to private contractors that have the government as a client. The First Amendment only protects employees from government employers when speaking publicly outside their official duties in the public interest Pickering v. Board of Ed. of Township High School Dist., updated and clarified by Lane v. Franks. Speech is not protected from private sector disciplinary action.

A number of cases consider speech related to or required by an employer, or speech retaliated against by a third party such as an employer. The case Lane vs. Burrows (previously Lane vs. Franks) considers a number of these matters and summarizes the outcome. A person who testifies in a court, and where that testimony is not part of their employment duties, testifies as a citizen and has First Amendment protection, whereas a person whose speech is an actual part of their duties and is not merely related to their duties may have no such protection.

The issues raised in such cases include the overriding need for persons in court to feel safe to speak the truth, and to in fact speak the truth; the requirement of employers to be able to act if an employee speaks in a manner damaging to the employer; the rights of whistleblowers; the benefit to society if people who know the reality of a matter and are well informed of it, are able to speak of it.

=== Student speech ===
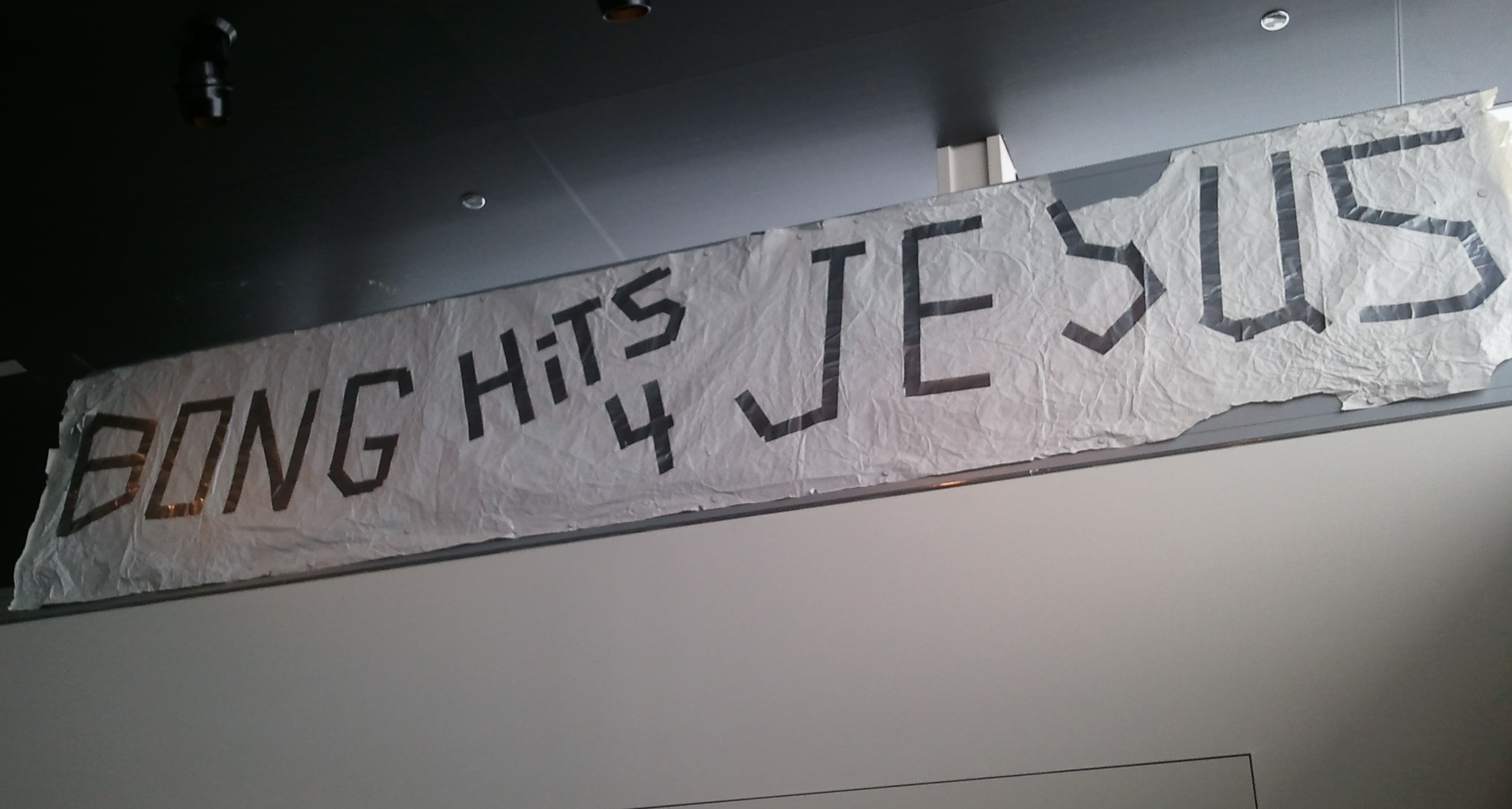
Original "BONG HITS FOR JESUS" banner, hanging in the Newseum in Washington, D.C.

In Tinker v. Des Moines Independent Community School District (1969), the Supreme Court extended broad First Amendment protection to children attending public schools, prohibiting censorship unless there is "substantial interference with school discipline or the rights of others". Several subsequent rulings have affirmed or narrowed this protection. Bethel School District v. Fraser (1986) supported disciplinary action against a student whose campaign speech was filled with sexual innuendo, and determined to be "indecent" but not "obscene". Hazelwood v. Kuhlmeier (1988) allowed censorship in school newspapers which had not been established as forums for free student expression. Guiles v. Marineau (2006) affirmed the right of a student to wear a T-shirt mocking President George W. Bush, including allegations of alcohol and drug use. Morse v. Frederick (2007) supported the suspension of a student holding a banner reading "BONG HiTS 4 JESUS" at a school-supervised event which was not on school grounds. In Lowry v. Watson Chapel School District, an appeals court struck down a school dress code and literature distribution policy for being vague and unnecessarily prohibitive of criticism against the school district.

Such protections also apply to public colleges and universities; for example, student newspapers which have been established as forums for free expression have been granted broad protection by appeals courts.

=== National security ===
==== Military secrets ====
Publishing, gathering, or collecting national security information is not protected speech in the United States. Information related to "the national defense" is protected even though no harm to the national security is intended or is likely to be caused through its disclosure. Non-military information with the potential to cause serious damage to the national security is only protected from willful disclosure with the requisite intent or knowledge regarding the potential harm. The unauthorized creation, publication, sale, or transfer of photographs or sketches of vital defense installations or equipment as designated by the President is prohibited. The knowing and willful disclosure of certain classified information is prohibited. The unauthorized communication by anyone of "Restricted Data", or an attempt or conspiracy to communicate such data, is prohibited. It is prohibited for a person who learns of the identity of a covert agent through a "pattern of activities intended to identify and expose covert agents" to disclose the identity to any individual not authorized access to classified information, with reason to believe that such activities would impair U.S. foreign intelligence efforts.

In addition to the criminal penalties, the use of employment contracts, loss of government employment, monetary penalties, non-disclosure agreements, forfeiture of property, injunctions, revocation of passports, and prior restraint are used to deter such speech.

==== Inventions ====
The Voluntary Tender Act of 1917 gave the Commissioner of Patents the authority to withhold certification from inventions that might harm U.S. national security, and to turn the invention over to the United States government for its own use. It was replaced in 1951 with the Invention Secrecy Act which prevented inventors from publishing inventions or sharing the information. Both attached criminal penalties to subjected inventors. The United States was under a declared state of emergency from 1950–1974, after which peacetime secrecy orders were available.

The government issued between approximately 4,100 to 5,000 orders per year from 1959 to 1974, a peak of 6,193 orders in 1991, and approximately 5,200 per year between from 1991 to 2003. Certain areas of research such as atomic energy and cryptography consistently fall within their gamut. The government has placed secrecy orders on cold fusion, space technology, radar missile systems, and Citizens Band radio voice scramblers, and attempts have been made to extend them to optical-engineering research and vacuum technology.

==== Nuclear information ====
The Atomic Energy Act of 1954 automatically classifies "all data concerning (1) design, manufacture, or utilization of atomic weapons; (2) the production of special nuclear material; or (3) the use of special nuclear material in the production of energy". The government has attempted and failed to prohibit publication of nuclear information, including bomb design, in Scientific American in 1950 and The Progressive in 1979.

==== Weapons ====
Pub. L. 106–54 (text) (PDF) of 1999, a bill focused on phosphate prospecting and compensation owed to the Menominee tribe, added 18 U.S.C. § 842(p) making it an offence "to teach or demonstrate the making or use of an explosive, a destructive device, or a weapon of mass destruction, or to distribute by any means information pertaining to, in whole or in part, the manufacture or use of an explosive, destructive device, or weapon of mass destruction" either intending or knowing "that the teaching, demonstration, or information be used for, or in furtherance of, an activity that constitutes a Federal crime of violence". This is in addition to other federal laws preventing the use and dissemination of bombmaking information for criminal purposes. The law was first successfully used against 18-year-old Sherman Martin Austin in 2003, for distribution of information which has since been republished freely. Austin plead guilty to the offense and his conviction was not appealed, so the constitutionality of 18 U.S.C. § 842(p) is still uncertain.

== Censorship ==
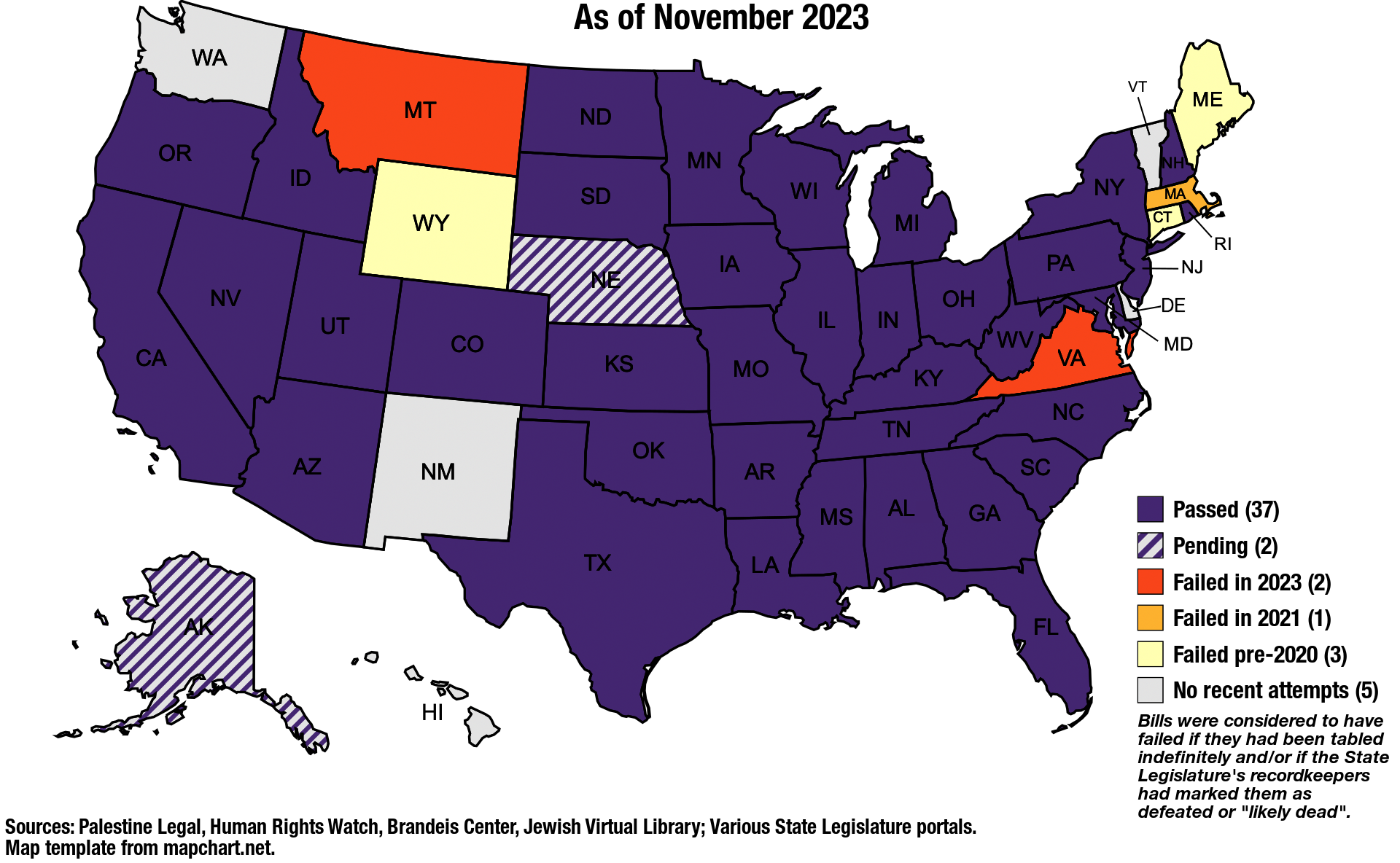
Map showing U.S. states where anti-BDS legislation has passed, is pending, or has failed as of November 2023

While personal freedom of speech is usually respected, freedom of press, and mass publishing meet with some restrictions. Some of the recent issues include:

- United States military censoring blogs written by military personnel
- The Federal Communications Commission (FCC) censoring television and radio, citing obscenity, e.g., Howard Stern and Opie and Anthony (though the FCC only has the power to regulate over the air broadcasts and not cable, satellite television, or satellite radio). See also Roth v. United States.
- Scientology suppressing criticism, citing freedom of religion, e.g., Keith Henson

Opponents of anti-BDS laws claim that Israel and its supporters are engaging in lawfare by lobbying for anti-BDS laws that infringe upon the right to free speech.

In 2002, the United States was ranked 17th of 167 countries in the annual worldwide Press Freedom Index of Reporters Without Borders. "The poor ranking of the United States (17th) is mainly because of the number of journalists arrested or imprisoned there. Arrests are often because they refuse to reveal their sources in court. Also, since the September 11 attacks, several journalists have been arrested for crossing security lines at some official buildings." In the 2006 index the United States fell further to 53rd of 168 countries; indeed, "relations between the media and the Bush administration sharply deteriorated" as it became suspicious of journalists who questioned the "war on terrorism". The zeal of federal courts which, unlike those in 33 U.S. states, refuse to recognize the media's right not to reveal its sources, even threatened journalists whose investigations did not pertain to terrorism. The United States improved, moving up to 48th place in 2007, however, and to 20th in 2010. In the following years, the rank again declined, placing the United States 45th in 2020.

== Internet speech, online forums ==
In a 9–0 decision, the Supreme Court extended the full protection of the First Amendment to the Internet in Reno v. ACLU, a decision that struck down portions of the 1996 Communications Decency Act, a law that prohibited "indecent" online communication. The court's decision extended the constitutional protections given to books, magazines, films, and spoken expression to materials published on the Internet. Congress tried a second time to regulate the content of the Internet with the Child Online Protection Act (COPA). In 2002, the Supreme Court again ruled in American Civil Liberties Union v. Ashcroft that any limitations on the Internet are unconstitutional.

In United States v. American Library Association (2003), the Supreme Court ruled that Congress has the authority to require public schools and libraries receiving e-rate discounts to install content-control software as a condition of receiving federal funding. The justices said that any First Amendment concerns were addressed by the provisions in the Children's Internet Protection Act that permit adults to ask librarians to disable the filters or unblock individual sites.

=== Code as speech ===
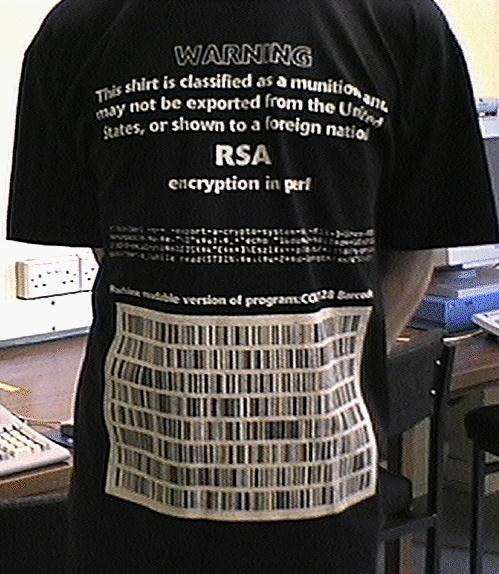
Export-restricted RSA encryption source code printed on a T-shirt made it an export-restricted munition, as a freedom of speech protest against U.S. encryption export restrictions (see the reverse side here).

Under code as speech, computer source code and similar digital expressions are taken to be speech protected by the First Amendment. Regulation of computer code most prominently began during the 1990s with the "crypto wars", when courts rejected government efforts to classify strong encryption software as export-controlled munitions. Since the district ruling Bernstein v. United States, code as speech has been invoked in disputes over government pressure to weaken encryption, as in the Apple-FBI phone case. It has also served to justify legal protection to cryptocurrencies and privacy tools, with advocates arguing that publishing or running such software is protected speech and expression. Similar arguments have been used for 3D-printed gun files and tools bypassing digital rights management.

== Private actors, private property, firing employees of private employers ==
Despite the common misconception that the First Amendment prohibits anyone from limiting free speech, the text of the amendment only prohibits the US Congress (and, by extension, those that derive their powers from Congress) from doing so. Starting with the 1925 U.S. Supreme Court decision Gitlow v. New York, this prohibition has been incorporated to apply to state and local governments as well, based on the text of the Fourteenth Amendment.

A major issue in freedom of speech jurisprudence has been whether the First Amendment should be interpreted to merely run against these state actors, or whether it can run against private actors as well. Specifically, the issue is whether private landowners should be permitted to use the machinery of government to exclude others from engaging in free speech on their property (which means balancing the speakers' First Amendment rights against the Takings Clause). The right of freedom of speech within private shopping centers owned by others has been vigorously litigated under both the federal and state Constitutions, most notably in the cases Lloyd Corp. v. Tanner (1972) and Pruneyard Shopping Center v. Robins (1980).

=== Social media platforms ===
Given the dispute between the Fifth and Eleventh circuits, it is likely that the Supreme Court will determine the proper First Amendment classification for social media. Privately owned social media platforms such as Facebook and Twitter are not bound by the First Amendment. Nevertheless, social media platforms have banned or censored users at the request of government staff and elected officials. Platforms have developed regulations and procedures of their own, attempting to balance free expression by their users against the moderation or removal of objectionable or harmful speech. In the course of developing private policies and procedures, they have in several cases employed concepts or standards developed by U.S. courts in free speech cases, such as the public figure doctrine developed since New York Times v. Sullivan.

Some observers have decried an erosion of free speech due to widespread use of the Internet and social media, which has allowed large groups of people who disapprove of particular speech have been able to swarm upon certain speakers and harass them with death and rape threats, send SWAT teams by making false reports to police, trigger boycotts of businesses, and in at least one case motivate a shooting. Targets have included a Massachusetts businessman who was seen in a photo apparently supporting Donald Trump, female video game designers and commentators, a diner where an anti-Trump employee made a negative comment to a pro-Trump customer, a public relations executive who tweeted an offensive joke before boarding a plane, and even victims of the 2017 Las Vegas shooting accused by anti-gun-control activists of faking the event.

=== College campuses ===
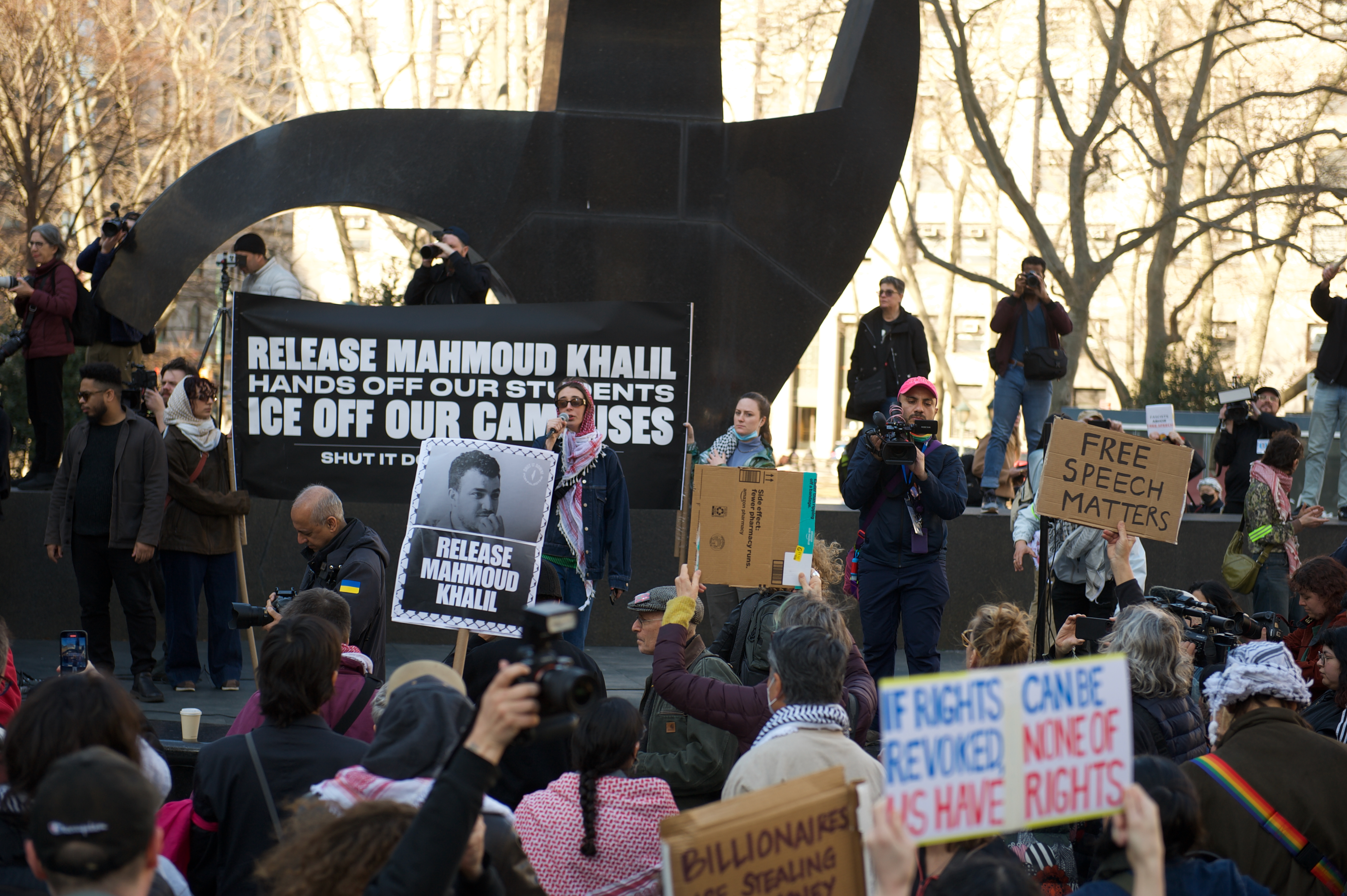
Protest against the detention of Mahmoud Khalil, New York City on March 10, 2025

First Amendment protections apply to public colleges and universities in the United States, significantly limiting the ability of school administrations or government bodies to impose restrictive speech codes at public institutions of higher education. However, much of the controversy over free expression in American colleges and universities has dealt with other questions of institutional policies, questions of academic freedom, and the climate of opinion on campus at both public and private institutions.

In July 2014, the University of Chicago released the "Chicago Statement," a free speech policy statement designed to combat censorship on campus. This statement was later adopted by a number of top-ranked universities including Princeton University, Washington University in St. Louis, Johns Hopkins University, and Columbia University. The Foundation for Individual Rights in Education (FIRE), a nonprofit legal advocacy group that focuses on campus speech issues, publishes annual "College Free Speech Rankings" based on their comparative assessment of campus speech policies, tolerance for controversial speakers, administrative support for free speech, and surveys of student attitudes towards speech on campus. Since 2011, the group has also published a list of the “worst colleges for free speech.”

In the 1980s-1990s and the 2010s-2020s, public debate over campus speech policies and the status of free speech on campus often turned on the question of whether American campuses provided an open or a hostile environment for the discussion of conservative or right-wing views, or for critical debate or "heterodox" approaches to liberal politics or social justice activism. Journalists such as David Brooks (commentator) and Robby Soave have criticized student activists' efforts to heckle or shut down controversial invited speakers, which they argue amounts to a heckler's veto on campus speech. The sociologist Musa al-Gharbi (writing for Heterodox Academy) and the legal advocate Greg Lukianoff (president of FIRE) have argued that college administrations have chilled or limited speech on campus through the partisan use of censorship and disciplinary proceedings that infringe on academic freedom. Other commentators such as Vox's Zack Beauchamp have disputed the claim that American college campuses are facing a "free-speech crisis," arguing that "incidents of speech by students or professors being suppressed are relatively rare," and are not directed along consistent partisan lines. Chris Quintana, writing in The Chronicle of Higher Education, argued that administration threats to academic freedom were in fact more likely to target controversial liberal professors than to be directed against conservative faculty.

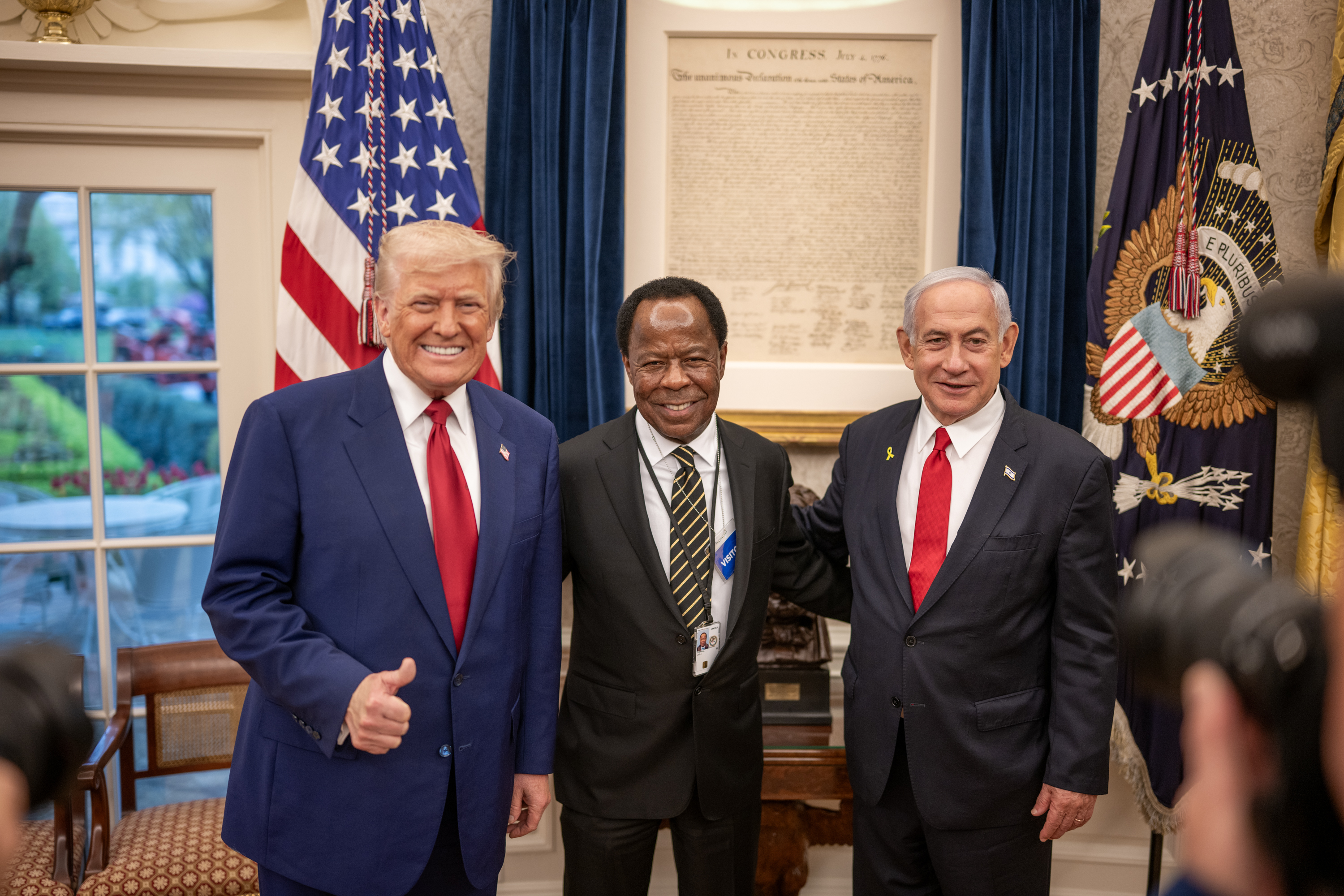
Leo Terrell, the head of the Trump administration's Task Force to Combat Antisemitism, with President Donald Trump and Israeli Prime Minister Benjamin Netanyahu on April 7, 2025

Donald Trump promised in his 2024 presidential campaign to crack down on pro-Palestinian student protesters. The Trump administration's battle with higher education includes deportations of pro-Palestinian international students.

In February 2025, Leo Terrell, the chair of the Department of Justice's Task Force to Combat Antisemitism, announced that he would investigate Columbia University, Harvard University, George Washington University, Johns Hopkins University, New York University, Northwestern University, the University of California, Berkeley, the University of California, Los Angeles, the University of Minnesota, and the University of Southern California as part of the Department of Justice's broader investigation into antisemitism on college campuses.

=== Protections for employees of private companies ===
Connecticut makes it illegal (under Connecticut General Statutes Section 31-51q) for an employer to fire an employee because of any exercise of that employee’s First Amendment rights, including the right to free speech, as long as the activity does not substantially or materially interfere with their job duties or their working relationship.

In the early 90s, the State of New York added Section 201-d to New York Labor Law. This statute prohibits discrimination on the basis of an employee’s political and recreational activities outside of working hours, off of the employer’s premises and without the use of the employer’s equipment. However, the statute permits an employer to take adverse action if the employee’s speech creates a material conflict of interest related to the employer’s trade secrets, proprietary information or other proprietary or business interest.

Colorado’s lawful off-duty conduct statute C.R.S. § 24-34-402.5 prohibits an employer from wrongfully terminating an employee because the employee engaged in any lawful activity off the premises of the employer during nonworking hours. There is an exception however: the statute authorizes employers to terminate employees for off-duty activities that are reasonably and rationally related to their employment. These are activities that are inherently connected to the individual’s employment and emanate from the employee’s job duties and the company’s business interests.

California goes further than Colorado, Connecticut and New York by generally restricting an employer’s ability to fire or demote employees for voicing views seen as controversial or even hateful, between or after work hours and away from work premises. Unlike the just mentioned three states, there is no statutory exception to this rule. California Labor Code section 96(k), allows California officials (specifically, the state labor commissioner) to represent people who were fired due to lawful conduct occurring during nonworking hours away from the employer’s premises, which includes the exercise of free speech. This is combined with Labor Code section 98.6(a), whereby an employer cannot fire an employee or in any manner discriminate, retaliate, or take any adverse action against any employee because they engaged in any conduct delineated under 96(k).

California law does not completely prohibit the termination of California employees for voicing their opinions after-hours, if this expression of speech is coupled with expressly illegal activity. One such test of 96(k) occurred with the 2021 Capitol Riots, where some California-based participants were laid off due to joining the storming of the capital. 96(k) did not apply to them due the illegality of conduct related to storming the capital.

California state courts have thus far not had to interpret 96(k)/98.6(a)-related cases when it comes to free speech. So far, there have been judge rulings on cases relating to managers dating their subordinates, destruction of company property, and employees not devoting enough time to their jobs.

== See also ==
- Areopagitica
- Censorship in the United States
- Clear and present danger
- Fleeting expletive
- Freedom of association § United States
- Free speech fights
- Free Speech, "The People's Darling Privilege"
- Free speech zone
- Freedom for the Thought That We Hate
- Freedom of speech
- Freedom of the press in the United States
- Government attacks on journalists in the United States
- Hollywood blacklist
- House Committee on Un-American Activities
- Imminent lawless action
- Indian removal
- International Covenant on Civil and Political Rights
- New York Times Co. v. United States
- Orwell's list
- Public Broadcasting Act of 1967
- Right to petition
- Shouting fire in a crowded theater
- Speech code
- Threatening the president of the United States
- Volksverhetzung limitations in Germany and other countries
