= United States obscenity law =

Regulates or suppresses obscenity

United States obscenity law deals with the regulation or suppression of what is considered obscenity and therefore not protected speech or expression under the First Amendment to the United States Constitution. In the United States, discussion of obscenity typically relates to defining what pornography is obscene. Issues of obscenity arise at federal and state levels. State laws operate only within the jurisdiction of each state, and state laws on obscenity differ. Federal statutes ban obscenity and child pornography produced with real children (such child pornography is unprotected by the First Amendment even when it is not obscene). Federal law also bans broadcasting (but not cable or satellite transmission) of "indecent" material during specified hours.

Most obscenity cases in the United States in the past century have involved images or films, but there have also been prosecutions of textual works as well, a notable one being that of the 18th-century novel Fanny Hill. Because censorship laws enacted to combat obscenity restrict the freedom of expression, crafting a legal definition of obscenity presents a civil liberties issue.

== Legal issues and definitions ==
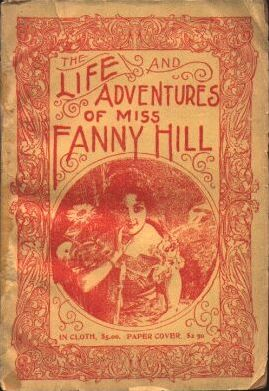
Cover of an undated American edition of Fanny Hill, c. 1910

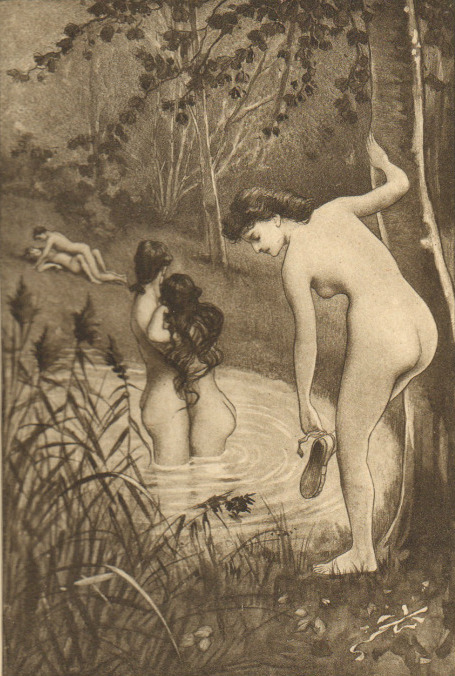
The 18th century book Fanny Hill has been subject to obscenity trials at various times (image: plate XI: The bathing party; La baignade).

The sale and distribution of obscene materials had been prohibited in most American states since the early 19th century, and by federal law since 1873. Adoption of obscenity laws in the United States at the federal level in 1873 was largely due to the efforts of Anthony Comstock, who created and led the New York Society for the Suppression of Vice. Comstock's intense efforts led to the passage of an anti-obscenity statute known as the Comstock Act which made it a crime to distribute "obscene" material through the post. It also prohibited the use of the mail for distribution of birth control devices and information. Comstock was appointed postal inspector to enforce the new law. Twenty-four states passed similar prohibitions on materials distributed within the states. The law criminalized not only sexually explicit material, but also material dealing with birth control and abortion. However, the legislation did not define "obscenity", which was left to the courts to determine on a case-by-case basis.

In the United States, the suppression or limitation of what is defined as obscenity raises issues of freedom of speech and of the press, both of which are protected by the First Amendment to the Constitution of the United States. The Supreme Court has ruled that obscenity is not protected by the First Amendment, but the courts must determine in each case whether the material in question is obscene. Erotic art (including "classic nude forms" such as Michelangelo's David statue) and less respected commercial pornography are generally not considered obscene.

The U.S. Supreme Court created the Miller test for courts to use to determine whether material is obscene. Because the Miller test uses "community standards", the same item can be legally obscene in one jurisdiction but protected by the First Amendment in another. With the advent of Internet distribution of potentially obscene material, this question of jurisdiction and community standards has created significant controversy in the legal community, because, since material on the internet may be accessible everywhere, the most restrictive community may be able to ban it everywhere. See United States v. Thomas, 74 F.3d 701 (6th Cir. 1996).

There does not exist a specific listing of material that is obscene apart from court decisions holding material obscene in particular communities. Title 18, chapter 71 of the U.S. Code makes obscene material illegal.

The Citizen's Guide to U.S. Federal Law on Obscenity lists several relevant statutes regarding obscenity.

=== Definition of obscenity ===
Although lower courts in the U.S. had used the Hicklin standard sporadically since 1868, it was not until 1879, when prominent federal judge Samuel Blatchford upheld the obscenity conviction of D. M. Bennett using the Hicklin test, that the constitutionality of the Comstock Law became firmly established.

In Rosen v. United States (1896), the Supreme Court adopted the same obscenity standard as had been articulated in a famous British case, Regina v. Hicklin, [1868] L. R. 3 Q. B. 360. The Hicklin test defined material as obscene if it tended "to deprave or corrupt those whose minds are open to such immoral influences, and into whose hands a publication of this sort may fall."

In the mid-1950s, the Supreme Court ruled in Roth v. United States, 354 U.S. 476 (1957) that the Hicklin test was inappropriate. Instead, the new Roth test for obscenity was:

whether to the average person, applying contemporary community standards, the dominant theme of the material, taken as a whole, appeals to the prurient interest.

In 1964, in Jacobellis v. Ohio, the Supreme Court held that a work could be obscene only if it was "utterly without redeeming social importance". In his concurring opinion in the case, Justice Potter Stewart stated that obscenity is "constitutionally limited to hard core pornography.... I shall not today attempt further to define the kinds of material I understand to be embraced within that shorthand description.... But I know it when I see it...." In Memoirs v. Massachusetts (1966) (dealing with the banning of the book Fanny Hill) the Court applied the Roth-Jacobellis test to determine that though the other aspects of the test were clear, the censor could not prove that Fanny Hill had no redeeming social value.

In 1973, the Supreme Court in Miller v. California established the three-pronged Miller test to determine what was obscene (and thus not protected) versus what was merely erotic and thus protected by the First Amendment. Delivering the opinion of the court, Chief Justice Warren Burger wrote:

The basic guidelines for the trier of fact must be: (a) whether "the average person, applying contemporary community standards" would find that the work, taken as a whole, appeals to the prurient interest; (b) whether the work depicts or describes, in a patently offensive way, sexual conduct specifically defined by the applicable state law; and (c) whether the work, taken as a whole, lacks serious literary, artistic, political, or scientific value.

The Miller test remains the U.S. judicial precedent for determining obscenity. However, the Supreme Court has clarified that only "the first and second prongs of the Miller test—appeal to prurient interest and patent offensiveness—are issues of fact for the jury to determine applying contemporary community standards". As for the third prong, "[t]he proper inquiry is not whether an ordinary member of any given community would find serious literary, artistic, political, or scientific value in allegedly obscene material, but whether a reasonable person would find such value in the material, taken as a whole".

=== Past standards ===
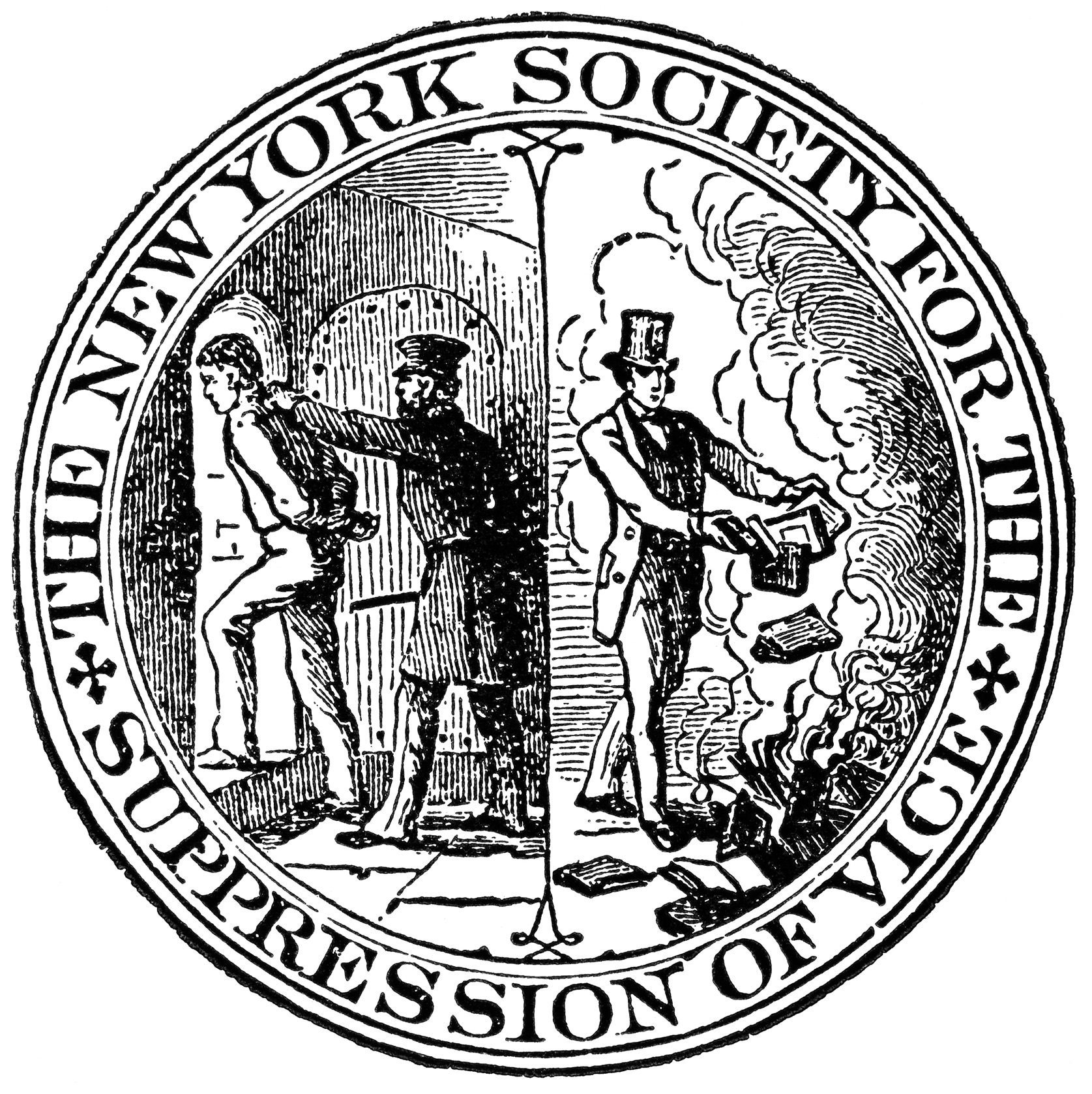
Symbol of the "New York Society for the Suppression of Vice", advocating book-burning

The following standards were once used by courts to determine obscenity. Each of them has been invalidated, overturned, or superseded by the Miller test.

- Hicklin test (1868): the effect of isolated passages upon the most susceptible persons. (British common law, cited in Regina v. Hicklin, 1868. LR 3 QB 360 — overturned when Michigan tried to outlaw all printed matter that would "corrupt the morals of youth" in Butler v. State of Michigan, 352 U.S. 380 (1957)).
- Wepplo test (1947): If material has a substantial tendency to deprave or corrupt its readers by inciting lascivious thoughts or arousing lustful desires. (People v. Wepplo, 78 Cal. App. 2d Supp. 959, 178 P.2d 853).

Under FCC rules and federal law, radio stations and over-the-air television channels cannot air obscene material at any time and cannot air indecent material between 6 a.m. and 10 p.m. "Indecent" material is language or pictures that, in context, describes or depicts, in terms patently offensive as measured by contemporary community standards for the broadcast medium, sexual or excretory organs or activities.

Many historically important works have been described as obscene or prosecuted under obscenity laws, including the works of Charles Baudelaire, Lenny Bruce, William S. Burroughs, Allen Ginsberg, James Joyce, D. H. Lawrence, Henry Miller, Samuel Beckett, and the Marquis de Sade.

=== Other court cases on obscenity and indecency ===
- FCC v. Pacifica (1978), better known as the "seven dirty words" case. In the decision, the Court found that only "repetitive and frequent" broadcast of indecent words at a time or place when a minor could hear them could be punished.
- In State v. Henry (1987), the Oregon Supreme Court ruled that the Oregon state law that criminalized obscenity was an unconstitutional restriction of free speech under the free speech provision of the Oregon Constitution, with the ruling making Oregon the "first state in the nation to abolish the offense of obscenity." Its doing so, however, does not affect the federal government's authority to enforce its obscenity statutes.
- In Reno v. ACLU (1997), the Supreme Court invalidated several indecency provisions in the 1996 Communications Decency Act applying to the internet.

=== Application of test ===
Under U.S. law, the question whether a publication is obscene is determined by the Miller test. Several sections of 18 U.S. Code, Chapter 71, prohibit the transmission of obscenity, and the Supreme Court has ruled that such statutes are constitutional. However, it has ruled unconstitutional restrictions on the personal possession of obscenity. Federal obscenity laws at present apply to the distribution of obscenity in interstate or foreign commerce or through the U.S. mail; intrastate issues are for the most part still governed by state law. "Obscene articles ... are generally prohibited entry" to the United States by U.S. Customs and Border Protection.

Pornography that is not obscene under the Miller test is protected by the First Amendment. One example of it is mere nudity. In Jenkins v. Georgia, 418 U.S. 153 (1974), the Supreme Court found the film Carnal Knowledge not to be obscene under the constitutional standards announced by Miller. As declared by the trial judge in Jenkins, "The film shows occasional nudity, but nudity alone does not render material obscene under Miller's standards." This principle was upheld in later cases, including Erznoznik v. City of Jacksonville, 422 U.S. 205, 206 (1975), in which "a Jacksonville, Fla., ordinance that prohibit[ed] showing films containing nudity by a drive-in theater when the screen was visible from a public street or place". The Supreme Court found the law invalid as an infringement of the First Amendment rights of the movie producer and theater owners.

A second example of protected pornography is single male-to-female vaginal-only penetration that does not show the ejaculation of semen (sometimes referred to as "soft-core" pornography), where the sexual act and its fulfillment (orgasm) are merely implied to happen rather than explicitly shown. In June 2006, the federal government brought a case against JM Productions of Chatsworth, California in order to classify commercial pornography that specifically shows actual semen being ejaculated as obscene. The four films that were the subject of the case were entitled American Bukkake 13, Gag Factor 15, Gag Factor 18 and Filthy Things 6. The case also included charges of distribution of obscene material (a criminal act under 18 USC § 1465 - "Transportation of obscene matters for sale or distribution") against Five Star DVD for the extra-state commercial distribution of the JM Productions films in question. At trial, the Department of Justice decided not to pursue the JM obscenity case any further. The jury found that Five Star Video LC and Five Star Video Outlet LC were guilty of violating "18 USC 1465 - Transportation of obscene matters for sale or distribution" for having shipped JM Productions' film Gag Factor 18. However, the specific content that the jury deemed "obscene" was not stated.

=== Obscenity vs. indecency ===
"Indecent" material that is not obscene or child pornography is protected by the First Amendment, except that the government may attempt to keep it away from minors. Examples of indecent material include nudity and George Carlin's "seven dirty words".

=== Non image-based obscenity cases in the United States ===
==== Obscene texts ====
While most of the obscenity cases in the United States in the past century have involved images or films, some have dealt with textual works. The prosecution of texts for being obscene started with Dunlop v. United States, 165 U.S. 486 (1897), which upheld a conviction for mailing and delivering a newspaper called the Chicago Dispatch, which contained "obscene, lewd, lascivious, and indecent materials". Another case was A Book Named "John Cleland's Memoirs of a Woman of Pleasure" v. Attorney General of Massachusetts, 383 U.S. 413 (1966), which found the book Fanny Hill, by John Cleland c. 1760, to be obscene in a proceeding that put the book itself on trial rather than its publisher. Another was Kaplan v. California, 413 U.S. 115 (1973), in which the court determined that "Obscene material in book form is not entitled to any First Amendment protection merely because it has no pictorial content."

However, the book was labeled "erotica" in the 1965 case (206 N.E. 2d 403) and there a division between erotica and obscenity was made—not all items with erotic content were automatically obscene. Further, the 1965 John Cleland's 'Memoirs case added a further requirement for the proving of "obscenity"—the work in question had to inspire or exhibit "prurient" (that is, "shameful or morbid") interest.

In 1964, the U.S. Supreme Court, in Grove Press, Inc. v. Gerstein, cited Jacobellis v. Ohio (which was decided the same day) and overruled state court findings of obscenity against Henry Miller's Tropic of Cancer. An unauthorized "Medusa" edition of the novel was published in New York City in 1940 by Jacob Brussel; its title page claimed its place of publication to be Mexico. Brussel was eventually sent to prison for three years for the edition, a copy of which is in the Library of Congress.

In 2005, the U.S. Department of Justice formed the Obscenity Prosecution Task Force in a push to prosecute obscenity cases. Red Rose Stories (www.red-rose-stories.com, now defunct), a site dedicated to text-only fantasy stories, became one of many sites targeted by the FBI for shutdown. The government alleged that Red Rose Stories contained depictions of child rape. The publisher pleaded guilty.

In June 2021, a 65-year-old Texas man, Thomas Alan Arthur, was sentenced to 40 years in federal prison after being convicted of "five counts of trafficking in obscene text stories about the sexual abuse of children", as well as "three counts of trafficking in obscene visual representations of the sexual abuse of a child" (drawings of minors engaged in sexual activity), and "one count of engaging in the business of selling obscene matters involving the sexual abuse of children". In October 2022, the United States Court of Appeals overturned Arthur's conviction on one of the obscene images counts, but affirmed his convictions on the remaining counts and remanded him for resentencing.

==== Obscene devices ====
Many U.S. states have had bans on the sale of sex toys, regulating them as obscene devices. For instance, the 1999 Law and Government of Alabama (Ala. Code. § 13A-12-200.1) made it "unlawful to produce, distribute or otherwise sell sexual devices that are marketed primarily for the stimulation of human genital organs." Alabama claimed that these products were obscene, and that there was "no fundamental right to purchase a product to use in pursuit of having an orgasm." The ACLU challenged the statute, which was overturned in 2002. A federal judge reinstated the law in 2004. The matter was appealed to the US Supreme Court, which in 2007 refused to hear the case, thereby allowing the lower court decision to be enforced in Alabama. In 2007, a federal appeals court upheld Alabama's law prohibiting the sale of sex toys. The law, the Anti-Obscenity Enforcement Act of 1998, was also upheld by the Supreme Court of Alabama on September 11, 2009.

But other states have seen their sex toy bans ruled unconstitutional by the courts. In 2008 the United States Court of Appeals for the Fifth Circuit ruled that a similar Texas statute violated the constitutional right to privacy that was recognized by the U.S. Supreme Court in Lawrence v. Texas. That ruling leaves only Mississippi, Alabama, and Virginia with bans on the sale of obscene devices. Alabama is the only state with a law specifically prohibiting the sale of sex toys.

=== Criticism ===
Obscenity law has been criticized in the following areas:

- The U.S. Supreme Court has had difficulty defining the term. In Miller v. California, the court bases its definition to two hypothetical entities, "contemporary community standards" and "reasonable persons".
- Legislatures have had similar problems defining the term.
- The Miller test denies defendants due process of law because they cannot know whether the material they distribute or possess is obscene until after the jury returns its verdict.
- The first two prongs of the Miller test — that material appeal to the prurient interest and be patently offensive — require the impossible. They "require the audience to be turned on and grossed out at the same time".
- Arguments have been made that the term "obscenity" is not defined in case law with sufficient specificity to satisfy the vagueness doctrine, which states that people must clearly be informed as to prohibited behavior.
- Critics have argued that no actual injury occurs when a mere preference is violated, so obscenity crimes are victimless.
- Critics have argued that, given its unusual and problematic history, unclear meaning, and the poor reasoning offered by the majorities in Roth and Miller to explain or justify the doctrine, the Supreme Court was simply wrong on the issue and the doctrine should be wholly discarded.
- Obscenity law can be used to target specific groups. For example, in the 1930s, 90 percent of those charged with obscenity were Jewish.

=== Public funding/public places ===
Congress passed a law in 1990 that required such organizations such as the National Endowment of the Arts (NEA) and National Association of Artists' Organizations (NAAO) to abide by general decency standards for the "diverse beliefs and values of the American public" in order to receive grant money.

In National Endowment for the Arts v. Finley (1998), the Supreme Court upheld the law, finding that the speech restrictions were constitutional because they were conditions on funding rather than a direct regulation of speech.

Artists who create sexually explicit art sometimes face complaints that their work is inappropriate for children or constitutes sexual harassment. Such artworks have been removed and "no nudity" policies have been put in place.

When these actions are challenged in court as violations of freedom of speech, the venues are often looked at to see if they are a "designated public forum." If they are, then public officials have violated the First Amendment rights of the individuals. If a court finds that the venue is not a designated public forum, then government officials have the right to exclude or censor the work.

=== Additional restrictions on sexual expression ===
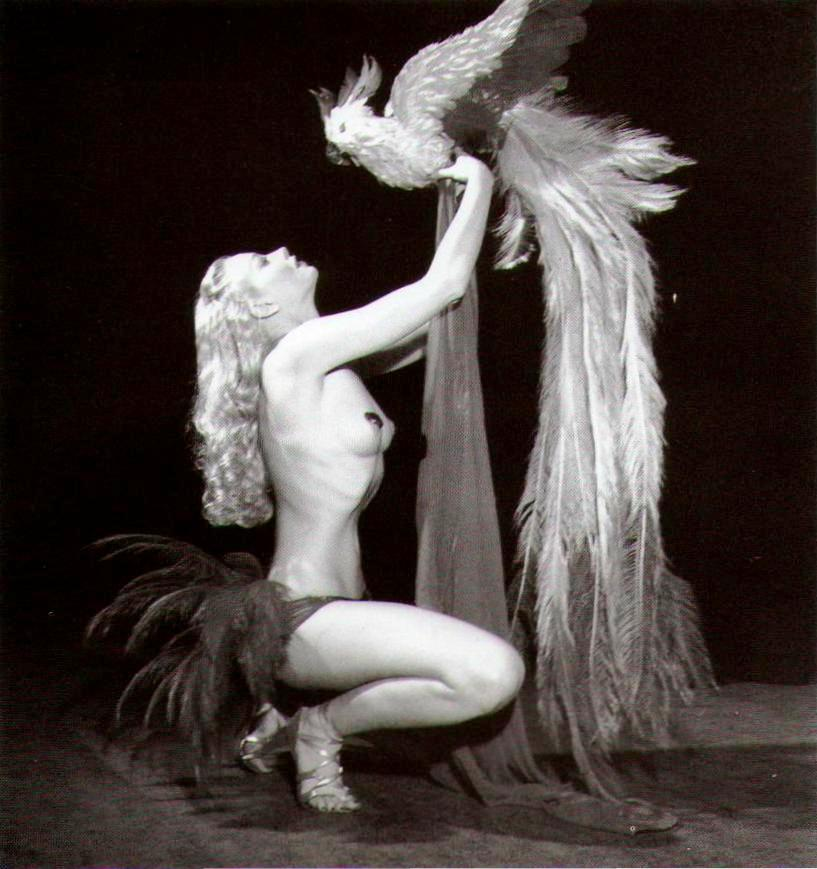
Lili St. Cyr, born Marie Van Schaack, with pasties

In the Miller decision the use of the words "contemporary community standards" typically means that the law evolves along with social mores and norms. This has been shown throughout the expansion of the pornography industry along with commercial pornography by people such as amateurs and publishers of personal websites on the World Wide Web. Indirect government control such as restrictive zoning of adult video stores and nude dancing were put in place because general obscenity convictions were harder to come by, but First Amendment case law allows reasonable time, place, and manner restrictions. Similarly a set of rules was put in place in Indiana to control erotic dancing, where legal, so that all dancers must either wear "pasties" or "g-strings" as shown in the 1991 case of Barnes v. Glen Theatre.

=== State laws ===
State laws as well as federal law attempt to regulate pornography. Between 1995 and 2002, almost half of the states were considering bills to control internet pornography, and more than a quarter of states enacted such laws. However, the federal courts, as in American Bookseller's Association v. Hudnut, have struck down anti-pornography laws as violating the First Amendment.

=== Censorship in schools, universities, and libraries ===
Schools, universities, and libraries receive government funds for many purposes, and some of these funds go to censorship of obscenity in these institutions. There are a few different ways in which this is done. One way is by not carrying pornographic or what the government deems obscene material in these places; another is for these places to purchase software that filters the internet activity on campus. An example is the federal Children's Internet Protection Act (CIPA). This mandates that all schools and libraries receiving federal aid for internet connections install a "technology protection measure" (filter) on all computers, whether used by children or adults. There are some states that have passed laws mandating censorship in schools, universities, and libraries even if they are not receiving government aid that would fund censorship in these institutions. These include Arizona, Kentucky, Michigan, Minnesota, South Carolina, and Tennessee. Twenty more states were considering such legislation in 2001–2002.

=== Child pornography ===
Child pornography refers to images or films (also known as child abuse images) and in some cases outside of the United States, writings depicting sexually explicit activities involving a child; as such, child pornography is a record of child sexual abuse. Abuse of the child occurs during the sexual acts that are recorded in the production of child pornography, and several professors of psychology state that memories of the abuse are maintained as long as visual records exist, are accessed, and are "exploited perversely."

In New York v. Ferber, 458 U.S. 747 (1982), the U.S. Supreme Court held that child pornography does not have to be found legally obscene to be prohibited. In Ashcroft v. Free Speech Coalition, 535 U.S. 234 (2002), the Supreme Court held that child pornography that is produced without using an actual minor (computer-generated images, for example) is protected by the First Amendment if not found to be obscene.

=== Censorship of film ===
Film censorship in the United States was recognized as constitutional without limits by the 1915 U.S. Supreme Court decision Mutual Film Corp. v. Industrial Commission of Ohio. This was overturned by the 1952 decision Joseph Burstyn, Inc. v. Wilson, denying First Amendment protection only to "obscene" films. The 1965 U.S. Supreme Court case Freedman v. Maryland ruled that prior restraint of film exhibition without a court order was unconstitutional, leading to the end of most state and local film censorship boards. Current laws that can be enforced after the fact are limited by the definition of "obscene" in the 1973 U.S. Supreme Court decision Miller v. California.

The voluntary Motion Picture Association film rating system was adopted in 1968, functioning mostly to prevent children of various ages from seeing certain films at participating theaters. This has sometimes led to self-censorship of certain sexual content among participating filmmakers wishing to avoid an X, R, or PG-13 rating that would restrict the size of the potential audience.

The most notable films given an "X" rating were Deep Throat (1972) and The Devil in Miss Jones (1973). These films show explicit, non-simulated, penetrative sex that was presented as part of a reasonable plot with respectable production values. Some state authorities issued injunctions against such films to protect "local community standards"; in New York the print of Deep Throat was seized mid-run, and the film's exhibitors were found guilty of promoting obscenity. This Film Is Not Yet Rated is a 2006 film that discusses disparities the filmmaker sees in ratings and feedback: between Hollywood and independent films, between homosexual and heterosexual sexual situations, between male and female sexual depictions, and between violence and sexual content. The filmmaker found that films that portrayed gay sex (even if implied), African American sex, or female pleasure as opposed to male pleasure were censored more than those that portrayed heterosexual sex and male pleasure involving white people.

== Possession of obscene material ==
In 1969, the Supreme Court held in Stanley v. Georgia that state laws making mere private possession of obscene material a crime are invalid, at least in the absence of an intention to sell, expose, or circulate the material. Subsequently, however, the Supreme Court rejected the claim that under Stanley there is a constitutional right to provide obscene material for private use or to acquire it for private use. The Court also held that there is no constitutional right to private possession of child pornography.

== See also ==
- Censorship in the United States
- Indecent exposure in the United States
- Legality of pornography in the United States
- Anti-Obscenity Enforcement Act (Alabama)
- Texas obscenity statute
- Hate speech in the United States
