= Heffron v. International Society for Krishna Consciousness =

Heffron v. Soc'y for Krishna Consciousness
- Supreme Court of the United States

Argued April 20, 1981 Decided June 22, 1981
- Full case name: Heffron v. International Society for Krishna Consciousness, Inc.
- Docket no.: 80-795
- Citations: 452 U.S. 640 (more)
- Argument: Oral argument

Questions presented
- Whether a Minnesota rule confining protected First Amendment activities to a fixed area within a state fairground is constitutional.

Holding
- The Minnesota Rule requiring that the sale of goods, distribution of literature, and solicitation of contributions be from a fixed location, is a reasonable time, place, and manner restriction of First Amendment activity.

Court membership
- Chief Justice Warren E. Burger Associate Justices William J. Brennan Jr. · Potter Stewart; Byron White · Thurgood Marshall; Harry Blackmun · Lewis F. Powell Jr. William Rehnquist · John P. Stevens

Case opinions
- Majority: White, joined by Burger, Stewart, Powell, Rehnquist
- Concurrence: Brennan, joined by Marshall, Stevens
- Concurrence: Blackmun
- Dissent: Brennan, joined by Marshall, Stevens
- Dissent: Blackmun

Laws applied
- U.S. Const. amend. I

Heffron v. International Society for Krishna Consciousness, Inc., 452 U.S. 640 (1981), was a United States Supreme Court case in which the Court held that a rule requiring that the sale of goods, distribution of literature, and solicitation of contributions be from a fixed location is a reasonable time, place, and manner restriction of the First Amendment activities.

== Background ==
Minnesota State Fair Rule 6.05 required all groups and individuals—whether commercial or charitable—to conduct sales, distribution, and solicitation only from designated locations.

The International Society for Krishna Consciousness (ISKCON) filed suit in state court, alleging that the rule unconstitutionally restricted the ability of its members to practice Sankirtan, a religious ritual that includes distributing literature and soliciting donations in public places.

The trial court upheld the constitutionality of Rule 6.05, but the Minnesota Supreme Court reversed. The U.S. Supreme Court granted the petition for certiorari and heard oral arguments on April 20, 1981.

== Opinion of the Court ==
The Supreme Court reversed the state court decision and upheld the state fair's rule.

Justice White authored the 5–4 majority decision, which held that the Minnesota rule, which confines protected First Amendment activities to a fixed area within a state fairground, is constitutional. The Court found the rule to be a valid "time, place, and manner" restriction on First Amendment speech.

Citing Consolidated Edison Co. v. Public Serv. Comm'n, the Court found that the Minnesota Rule was not “based upon either the content or subject matter of the speech." The Court also recognized that Minnesota's interest in maintaining the safe and orderly movement of the crowd at the Fair was a valid governmental interest of the state. The Court determined that there was no less restrictive means available, considering the disorder if all organizations at the state fair were exempted from the restriction.

The Court noted that the Minnesota Rule did not prohibit ISKCON from practicing the religious ritual outside the fairgrounds, nor did it deny ISKCON members access to the fairgrounds. The Rule also did not deny any organization the right to conduct First Amendment activities at some point within the fairgrounds. An organization can rent a booth, distribute and sell literature, and solicit funds from that location.

Justice Brennan wrote a separate opinion, concurring in part and dissenting in part, in which Marshall and Stevens joined. Justice Blackmun filed an opinion concurring in part and dissenting in part.

== Impact ==
The decision established what is now known as the "Heffron Principle," which affirms that the First Amendment does not guarantee the right to communicate one's views at all times, in all places, or in any manner desired. Critics noted that the Court accepted the traditional values embodied in the First Amendment, yet did not clearly articulate or fully apply them, as the Court sought to strike a just balance.

== See also ==
- Freedom of speech in the United States
