= List of United States Supreme Court cases, volume 452 =

This is a list of all the United States Supreme Court cases from volume 452 of the United States Reports:

Case name	Citation	Date decided
Little v. Streater	452 U.S. 1	1981
Lassiter v. Dept. Social Servs.	452 U.S. 18	1981
Schad v. Mount Ephraim	452 U.S. 61	1981
Gulf Oil Co. v. Bernard	452 U.S. 89	1981
Minnick v. Cal. Dept. of Corrections	452 U.S. 105	1981
McDaniel v. Sanchez	452 U.S. 130	1981
Ford Motor Credit Co. v. Cenance	452 U.S. 155	1981
Washington Cnty. v. Gunther	452 U.S. 161	1981
Anderson Bros. Ford v. Valencia	452 U.S. 205	1981
Am. Express Co. v. Koerner	452 U.S. 233	1981
Rowan Cos. v. United States	452 U.S. 247	1981
Hodel v. Virginia Surface Min. & Reclamation Ass'n	452 U.S. 264	1981
Hodel v. Indiana	452 U.S. 314	1981
Rhodes v. Chapman	452 U.S. 337	1981
Nat'l Gerimedical Hosp. v. Blue Cross	452 U.S. 378	1981
Federated Dept. Stores, Inc. v. Moitie	452 U.S. 394	1981
Jones v. Helms	452 U.S. 412	1981
United States v. Maine	452 U.S. 429	1981
California v. Arizona	452 U.S. 431	1981
Maryland v. Louisiana	452 U.S. 456	1981
Conn. Bd. of Pardons v. Dumschat	452 U.S. 458	1981
Howe v. Smith	452 U.S. 473	1981
Am. Textile Mfrs. Inst. Inc. v. Donovan	452 U.S. 490	1981
Monroe v. Standard Oil Co.	452 U.S. 549	1981
United States v. Turkette	452 U.S. 576	1981
Donovan v. Dewey	452 U.S. 594	1981
Plumbers v. Local 334	452 U.S. 615	1981
Heffron v. International Society for Krishna Consciousness	452 U.S. 640	1981
First Nat'l Maintenance Corp. v. NLRB	452 U.S. 666	1981
Michigan v. Summers	452 U.S. 692	1981
Kissinger v. Halperin	452 U.S. 713	1981
N.Y. State Liquor Auth. v. Bellanca	452 U.S. 714	1981
United States v. Louisiana (1981)	452 U.S. 726	1981
Schweiker v. McClure	452 U.S. 1301	1981
