= New York's Reforming the Energy Vision =

New York's Reforming the Energy Vision (REV) is a set of multi-year regulatory proceedings and policy initiatives launched in New York state in 2014. REV is intended to transform the way electricity is produced, bought and sold in New York and enable the integration of renewable energy generation and smart grid technologies on the electric grid. REV is ongoing with no predefined end date, and will impact all New York utilities and ratepayers.

REV encompasses numerous policies and proceedings in the state of New York, as well as a restructuring of state utility ratemaking and revenue models. REV's utility reform component is part of a new trend toward utility reform that coincides with the drop in renewable energy prices.

== Origins in the Cuomo administration ==
The Andrew Cuomo administration, the New York Public Service Commission (PSC), and energy policy lead Richard Kauffman announced REV in April 2014. When they introduced REV, the administration cited the need to modernize New York's utility infrastructure to be more resilient in light of the impact of Hurricane Sandy. They also cited trends such as the aging of the electric grid, the need to control energy prices, and the threat of climate change.

In February 2015, the New York Public Service Commission (PSC) issued the REV Track One order, which adopted the official policy framework that serves as the basis of the REV proceedings.

== Objectives ==
Overall, REV aims to make it easier for New York consumers and utilities to invest in distributed energy resources (DERs) and smart grid technology. Cuomo's administration hope that this shift will in turn create a more energy-efficient and resilient energy grid and a strong market for new energy technologies in New York State.

== Utility ratemaking and revenue models ==
REV's utility reform proceedings are intended to change the way that electric utilities make money. Utilities will maintain their former status as energy distributors, but will also assume the role of "market operators," facilitating transactions between those who provide energy and those who use it. Utilities will be incentivized to use DER in their grid planning efforts.

In this new role, utilities will own the distributed service platform (DSP) that DER sellers and retail customers use to buy and sell electricity. REV envisions that current utilities in New York state will become a sort of “mini-ISO” as it relates to DERs. Utilities will be incentivized to use DER in their grid planning efforts.

== Process and timeline ==
New York's utilities are required to cooperate with the public service commission and other bodies to develop the new earnings mechanisms.

The detailed and necessary actions that are required of all stakeholders to execute the goals of REV have only recently been more clearly defined. Many utilities are in the process of determining how they will respond the new policy. It is unclear how long the transition to the new model will take.

The REV policy is being executed in two tracks. Both tracks seek to meet the same three goals:

- Create a more diversified grid and business model that better integrates customers and third parties
- Ensure that utilities are responsible for providing universal, reliable, resilient, and secure service at just and reasonable prices
- Improve the overall efficiency of the system by combining utility and third party investment

Track One is described in an order released on February 26, 2015, focuses on shaping the new utility vision and DER ownership challenges.

Track Two described in an order released on May 16, 2016, focuses on the necessary changes in the current regulatory, tariff, market, and incentive structures.

== Related initiatives and documents ==
The New York State Energy Plan is well integrated with REV and is intended to provide a roadmap for executing the REV policy. The New York State Energy Plan was released by the Cuomo administration in 2015. The Plan lays out New York's clean energy ambitions and includes the REV proceedings.

== Ratepayer impacts and involvement ==
Governor Cuomo has cited ratepayer interested as part of the impetus for REV. Successful implementation of REV initiatives has the potential to save residents of New York state between $1.4 to $2.1 billion per year.

State leaders are aware that low income customers and renters may be less likely to participate in distributed energy solutions like solar, that often require financing. As a partial solution, NY-SUN's Community Distribution Generation program supports these customers. REV is also poised to make changes slowly such that utilities can remain profitable and effective operators of the grid through the transition.

The creators of REV believe the new utility model will allow ratepayers to better manage their energy usage and reduce their energy bills. For example, implementing Time of Use (TOU) rates and creating transparency that shows customers how much they could save by shifting electricity usage to lower peak demand parts of the day.

However, the costs of overhauling the current utility model could theoretically be passed down to consumers. One of the largest costs will be creating the two way grid to support DERs.

== Impact ==
Supporters of REV reference Consolidated Edison's (ConEd) Brooklyn/Queens Demand Management Program (BQDM) as an early success of REV. In place of requesting funds for capital expenditures to construct a $1 billion substation in Brooklyn to meet increasing load demand, ConEd utilized solar, batteries and energy efficiency solutions and was compensated in the same way a capital expenditure would be.

== Challenges ==
New York's current electricity grid is not currently set up to handle bi-directional resource generation. This is critical to the success of REV and must be resolved if REV policies are expected to be fully implemented.

== Criticism ==
The Alliance for a Green Economy, an environmental group is advocating that the new DSP should be operated by an entity independent from the current utilities. They do not believe that allowing the current utilities to be responsible for the DSP platform will put customers on the same level playing field as the utilities.

== Impact outside of New York ==
New York is a leader in taking steps to update the most common utility model currently used throughout the United States. Regulators, utilities and stakeholders in other states and jurisdictions are closely watching the progress of REV implementation. Seven states (California, Hawaii, Minnesota, Michigan, Massachusetts, Missouri, and Wisconsin) have open dockets related to utility business models.
