= New York Public Service Commission =

Department of the New York state government

New York State Public Service Commission

Commission overview
- Formed: 1907
- Jurisdiction: New York
- Headquarters: 3 Madison Ave, Albany, NY 12223
- Employees: 528 (2022)
- Annual budget: $117.5 million (2021)
- Commission executive: Rory Christian, Chairman
- Key document: Public Service Law
- Website: www.dps.ny.gov

The New York Public Service Commission is the public utilities commission of the New York state government that regulates and oversees the electric, gas, water, and telecommunication industries in New York as part of the Department of Public Service. The department's regulations are compiled in title 16 of the New York Codes, Rules and Regulations. The current chairman of the commission and chief executive of the Department is Rory M. Christian. His term began on June 10, 2021, and runs through February 1, 2027.

== Organization ==
The Public Service Commission consists of seven members, each appointed by the Governor of New York with the advice and consent of the New York State Senate for a term of six years or to complete an unexpired term of a member. A commissioner is designated as chairman by the Governor to serve in such capacity at the pleasure of the Governor or until their term as commissioner expires. No more than three commissioners may be members of the same political party. The Public Service Commission is within the Department of Public Service, and the chairman is the chief executive officer of the department.

In 2017, the Public Service Commission and the Department of Public Service were appropriated $101.4 million from the state budget and employed 556 people. The payroll totaled $44,195,996 and a commissioner was not listed among the top 25 salary earners. Engineering staff who are licensed professional engineers do not produce stamped engineering plans.

== History ==
The Public Service Commission was established in 1907. Notable former employees include Nora Stanton Blatch Deforest Barney and Delos Franklin Wilcox.

== Reforming the Energy Vision ==
In 2014 the Commission and New York Governor Andrew Cuomo initiated Reforming the Energy Vision. Reforming the Energy Vision (commonly abbreviated as REV) is a set of multi-year regulatory proceedings and policy initiatives. The end goals of REV include reducing carbon emissions from the electric sector and opening up new markets in New York state for emerging energy technologies. The affected utilities in the state of New York include Central Hudson Gas & Electric Corporation, Consolidated Edison Company of New York, National Grid, New York State Electric & Gas Corporation, and Orange and Rockland Utilities. In addition to the core project of utility restructuring, the REV initiative also encompasses a number of other energy programs, some of which were launched before REV itself. These include K-Solar, NY Prize, NY-Sun, BuildSmart NY and the state's Green Bank. Although the state regulates the siting process of utility-scale (25 MW or greater) electric generation in New York via the Board on Electric Generation Siting and the Environment, much of the planning process for utility-scale electric generation is undertaken by the New York Independent System Operator (NYISO), an organization regulated under the Federal Energy Regulatory Commission. The NYISO maintains an interconnection queue where it may be possible to calculate the success rate of utility-scale electric generation and merchant transmission proposals.

In 2016, the Public Service Commission adopted a Clean Energy Standard, to assist in achieving the state's target of obtaining 50% of its electricity from renewable and nuclear sources by 2030, which will see customer bills increase to support these sources. A particular aim was to support three nuclear plants, Ginna, James A. FitzPatrick and Nine Mile Point that had become uneconomic; the support for nuclear is expected to cost $1 billion in the first two years.

== Rate cases ==
The commission's regulatory oversight extends to the approval of retail consumer rate increase (or decrease) requests from the electric, water, steam, and local natural gas distribution utilities it regulates. The commission approves (or denies) these rate requests because each utility operates as a monopoly service provider in its retail region. This is a process which offers the public an opportunity to comment. Utilities determine when they wish to file for a new case. The commission uses a standard of reasonability – or how a reasonable person would judge – to assess the public need for proposed levels of capital expenditures, operating expenditures and other spending. Regulated utilities are publicly-traded companies, and must also provide returns for shareholders. These returns are argued for in these rate cases. A return on equity of around 10 percent is typical, although some critiques find that typical practices inflate these statistics.

== Electric power facilities siting ==
=== Transmission facilities siting ===
For the incumbent electric utility companies and the merchant transmission developers that it regulates, the commission must issue a Certificate of Environmental Compatibility and Public Need prior to the operation and construction of an electric transmission line – a "major utility transmission facility" – in the state. This is pursuant to Article VII of the Public Service Law. The process provides for public notification and participation. This certificate provides detail on the final routing of a transmission line, the public need for the line, the probable environmental impact of the line, among other details. After this certificate is granted, the utility or developer then files an Environmental Management and Construction Plan that the commission also must approve prior to construction. It may require many years for a project, depending upon the level of controversy, to proceed through the Article VII siting process, although it may take only 6 months to construct. The certification process can take even longer if routing occurs through municipalities that are charged with managing a Municipal Separate Storm Sewer System (MS4). Final state certification requires approval from the local MS4 municipality in accordance with its MS4 plan.

=== Part 102 siting ===
There are some instances when electric transmission lines can be built without going through the Article VII transmission facilities siting process. The Public Service Law defines a "major utility transmission facility" as an electric transmission line operating at greater than 125-kilovolts (kV) and longer than 1-mile in length, or an electric transmission line operating at greater than 100-kV (and less than 125-kV) and greater than 10 miles in length. It does not extend this definition to transmission facilities located wholly underground in cities with a population of greater than 125,000 people or to facilities approved in relation to FERC-certified hydroelectric facilities. Notably, Part 102 of the Public Service Law, for example, allows for the 60-day review of a 115-kV transmission line with a length of less than 10 miles, without a formal response from the commission. Part 102 filing has enabled certain utilities to maintain their infrastructure without being burdened with the financial and time constraints of Article VII filings.

=== Generation facilities siting ===
Electric generation facilities siting in New York is the responsibility of a multi-agency board called the Siting Board on Electric Generation Siting and the Environment. It reviews and certifies projects with proposed capabilities of 25 MWs or greater. Its board members are the heads of the Public Service Commission, the Department of Health, the Department of Environmental Conservation, NYSERDA, and the Empire State Development Corporation. The generation siting process in New York is still fairly young – the Article 10 statutes passed into law in 2011 by Governor Andrew Cuomo. Prior to the Article 10 regulations, Public Service Law Section 68 acted as a gap regulation after the expiration of the Article X – not "10" – process in the early 2000s.

=== Local community response and participation ===
The local community response to proposed electric facilities siting depends largely upon the notification process to local land owners. The Article VII and Article 10 regulations call for fairly wide notification. The Article 10 process, notably, invites local community members to serve as Siting Board members. Many of the comments posted by local community members reflect NIMBY positions or appeals to a perceived health threat from low-frequency electric and magnetic fields. As of 2018, a large number of proposed wind turbine facilities located in Western and Upstate New York are being processed under the Article 10 regulations, and the impacts of astroturfing and the rate at which the commission staff can process the amount of these projects has yet to be determined.

== Service disruptions ==
The commission uses various tools to monitor and investigate utility service disruptions. Their response to events that cause or have the potential to cause service disruptions has historically depended upon media coverage, administrative agendas, the number of customers impacted, and the severity to which customers are impacted. Prior to large storms and other weather disturbances, the commission will send staff to the State Office of Emergency Management bunker located in the New York State Police headquarters to report on electric outage numbers during the event. This bunker is usually staffed 24 hours a day for the duration of an event, and utility company staff may also be present. The GIS software that commission staff uses to report outage information to SOEM staff aggregates freely available outage numbers from each utility website in real-time.

== See also ==
- Avangrid
- Consolidated Edison (Con Edison)
- Consolidated Edison v. Public Service Commission
- Fortis Inc.
- Green Island Power Authority
- Indian Point Energy Center
- Long Island Power Authority (LIPA)
- National Grid plc
- New York energy law
- New York State Energy Research and Development Authority (NYSERDA)
- New York Power Authority (NYPA)
- New York Independent System Operator (NYISO)
- Scenic Hudson Preservation Conference v. Federal Power Commission
- Transmission Owner Transmission Solutions
- Walkway over the Hudson
