= Rhodes v. Chapman =

- Supreme Court of the United States

Decided June 15, 1981
- Full case name: Rhodes v. Chapman
- Citations: 452 U.S. 337 (more)

Holding
- Whether prison conditions constitute cruel and unusual punishment must be proven with objective proof of the excessive harms caused directly by the challenged conditions.

Court membership
- Chief Justice Warren E. Burger Associate Justices William J. Brennan Jr. · Potter Stewart; Byron White · Thurgood Marshall; Harry Blackmun · Lewis F. Powell Jr. William Rehnquist · John P. Stevens

Case opinions
- Majority: Powell, joined by Burger, Stewart, White, Rehnquist
- Concurrence: Brennan (in judgment), joined by Blackmun, Stevens
- Concurrence: Blackmun (in judgment)
- Dissent: Marshall

Rhodes v. Chapman, 452 U.S. 337 (1981), was a United States Supreme Court case in which the court held that whether prison conditions constitute cruel and unusual punishment must be proven with objective proof of the excessive harms caused directly by the challenged conditions.

== Background ==
Incarcerated people who were housed in the same cell in an Ohio maximum security prison brought a class action in federal district court under Section 1983 against state officials, alleging that "double celling" (forcing people to have cellmates while in prisons) violated the Constitution and seeking injunctive relief. Despite its generally favorable findings of fact, the district court concluded that the double celling was cruel and unusual punishment in violation of the Eighth Amendment, as made applicable to the States through the Fourteenth Amendment. This conclusion was based on five considerations: (1) inmates at the prison were serving long-terms of imprisonment; (2) the prison housed 38% more inmates than its "design capacity"; (3) the recommendation of several studies that each inmate have at least 555 square feet of living quarters, as opposed to the 63 square feet shared by the double celled inmates; (4) the suggestion that double celled inmates spend most of their time in their cells with their cellmates; and (5) the fact that double celling at the prison was not a temporary condition. The Court of Appeals affirmed.

== Opinion of the court ==
The court issued an opinion on June 15, 1981, holding that double celling was not inherently cruel and unusual punishment prohibited by the Eighth and Fourteenth Amendments. Justice Lewis F. Powell Jr. delivered the opinion of the court, Justice Thurgood Marshall filed a dissenting opinion. The court opined that restrictive and harsh conditions were part of the penalty that criminals pay for their offenses against the society, and the five conditions relied upon by the district court were insufficient to support the conclusion of unconstitutionality.

The judgment also clarified that in discharging their oversight responsibility to determine whether prison conditions were cruel and unusual punishment, courts could not assume that the state legislature and officials are insensitive to the constitutional requirements or to the sociological problems in achieving the goals of the penal function in the criminal justice system. The dissenting opinion by Justice Marshall noted that "everybody" is in agreement that double celling is undesirable and would inflict serious harm on inmates, and that the Eighth Amendment embodies a broad and idealistic concept of dignity, civilized standards, humanity, and decency.
