= Texas obscenity law =

Unconstitutional Texas law banning the sale of sex toys

The Texas obscenity statute is a statute that regulates the distribution, promotion, and sales of obscene materials. It originally sought to regulate devices one uses to stimulate oneself sexually. While this ban still exists in the statute, in 2008 the U.S. Court of Appeals for the fifth circuit ruled in Reliable Consultants, Inc v. Earle that the ban violates the Fourteenth Amendment to the U.S. Constitution, so has no effect. The statute has since then evolved to control online media and obscene distributors.

== History ==
In 1973, the Texas Legislature passed Section 43.21 of the Texas Penal Code, which, in part, prohibited the sale or promotion of "obscene devices". The statute defines "obscene device" as "a device including a dildo or artificial vagina, designed or marketed as useful primarily for the stimulation of human genital organs". The legislation was last updated in 2003, and Section 43.23 currently states, "A person commits an offense if, knowing its content and character, he wholesale promotes or possesses with intent to wholesale promote any obscene material or obscene device." Section (f) of the law also criminalizes the possession of six or more devices (or "multiple identical or similar" devices) as "presumed to possess them with intent to promote."

An update to the relevant legislation became effective in September 2025, reflecting legislative actions in Texas shifting the focus of obscenity laws from physical devices toward online content and access by minors. While earlier statutes such as Section 43.23 of the Texas penal Code targeted the promotion and sale of obscene devices, most recent laws emphasize age verification and restrictions on digital material. The legislation still makes it illegal for "any unlawful wholesale promotion or possession of any obscene material or obscene device with the intent to wholesale promote the same"

== Prosecuted cases ==
Prosecution under the statute has been rare. In 2001, attorneys Mary and Ted Roberts used the obscenity statute in an elaborate extortion scheme against a number of men who had engaged in extramarital relations with Mary Roberts. In Burleson in 2004, Joanne Webb faced up to one year in prison for selling a vibrator to two undercover police officers posing as a married couple at a private party. She was later acquitted, and the undercover officers were issued reprimands. In 2007, a lingerie shop in Lubbock was raided, and items "deemed to be illegal by the Texas Penal Code" were confiscated. The clerk on duty at the time was arrested, but charges were later dropped.

== Classifications and penalties ==
If one is in possession of obscene material with intent to either distribute or promote, it is a Class A Misdemeanor, which is punishable with up to one year in county jail as well as a fine up to 4,000 dollars. If recharged with the same crime again, it is a State Jail Felony, which punishable with 180 days to two years in state jail with a fine of up to 10,000 dollars.

If one is in possession of large amounts of obscene material with intent to distribute or promote, it is considered a State Jail Felony. If charged again for large amounts of obscene material, it is a third degree felony with a sentence of 2–10 years in state jail as well as a fine up to 10,000 dollars.

If offenses happen within a 1000-foot radius of a school, charges may be increased and those charged are required to register as a sex offender.

== Appeals ==
Reliable Consultants, Inc., which operates four retail stores in Texas that carry a stock of sexual devices, and PHE, Inc., which is also engaged in the retail distribution of sexual devices through their website and catalogs, both filed lawsuits against the legislation, claiming that the statute is unconstitutional. In an appeal from the United States District Court for the Western District of Texas, a three-judge panel of the United States Court of Appeals for the Fifth Circuit overturned the statute on February 12, 2008, by a vote of 2–1, holding that "the statute has provisions that violate the Fourteenth Amendment of the U.S. Constitution". The State of Texas filed a petition on February 22, 2008, for the Circuit Court to rehear the argument en banc.

On July 3, 2008, Texas's 13th Court of Appeals in Corpus Christi in the case of Villareal v. State, addressed the ruling of the federal Court of Appeals. The 13th Court of Appeals ruled that until the Texas Court of Criminal Appeals rules that Section 43.23 is unconstitutional, the promotion of obscene devices remains illegal. Therefore, despite the actions of the federal courts and the Texas Attorney General described elsewhere in this article, Section 43.23 remains in effect in the twenty-county area of Texas within the jurisdiction of the 13th Court of Appeals.

On August 1, 2008, the Fifth Circuit denied Texas's request to re-hear the case en banc. The refusal created a split between federal circuits: the 5th Circuit overturned the Texas law and the 11th Circuit upheld the nearly identical Anti-Obscenity Enforcement Act in Alabama. The presence of a "circuit split" increases the likelihood that the Supreme Court of the United States will grant a writ of certiorari and ruling in order to clear up the disagreement between the two Courts of Appeals.

On November 4, 2008, U.S. District Judge Lee Yeakel released a two-page document dated October 29, 2008, in which he stated that the Texas Attorney General's Office notified him that they would not file a writ of certiorari with the Supreme Court. The next month, on November 13, Yeakel filed a "joint status report" that noted the parties had come to an agreement. "Texas Penal Code §§ 43.23, to the extent that it applies to 'obscene devices' as defined in Texas Penal Code § 43.21(a)(7), is declared to be facially unconstitutional and unenforceable throughout the State of Texas".

== State of the law today ==
As of March 20, 2026, recent legislative actions in Texas have significantly shifted the focus of state obscenity laws away from physical "obscene devices" and toward the regulation of online content and access by minors. While Section 43.23 of the Texas Penal Code remains in effect, prohibiting the "wholesale promotion" of obscene materials and maintaining a legal presumption of intent to promote for anyone possessing six or more similar items. In 2023, Texas passed HB 1181, which mandates that websites publishing sexually explicit material implement robust age-verification systems to prevent access by minors.

== See also ==
- Anti-Obscenity Enforcement Act (Alabama statue)
- Legality of pornography in the United States
- Indecent exposure in the United States
- Censorship in the United States
- United States obscenity law
