= Halperin v. Kissinger =

1979 American court case

- Court: United States Court of Appeals for the District of Columbia Circuit
- Full case name: Morton Halperin, et al. v. Henry Kissinger, Richard M. Nixon, John N. Mitchell, and H. R. Haldeman
- Argued: February 9, 1979
- Decided: July 12, 1979
- Citation: 606 F.2d 1192

Case history
- Prior history: Summary judgment granted, 424 F. Supp. 838 (D.D.C.1976); nominal damages awarded, 434 F. Supp. 1193 (D.D.C. 1977).
- Subsequent history: Affirmed in part by equally divided Supreme Court, Kissinger v. Halperin, 452 U.S. 713 (1981) (per curiam).

Court membership
- Judges sitting: James Skelly Wright, Spottswood William Robinson III, Gerhard Gesell

Case opinions
- Majority: Wright, joined by Robinson
- Concur/dissent: Gesell

Halperin v. Kissinger was a court case filed by Morton Halperin against National Security Advisor Henry Kissinger, who approved wiretapping Halperin's home and White House office. The wiretaps continued for 21 months, from May 1969 until February 1971.

The tap was installed during an investigation into disclosures made to a reporter. The wiretap was illegal as it was performed without a court order.

== Court proceedings ==
=== Proceedings in the 1970s ===
Halperin filed the lawsuit in the U.S. District Court for the District of Columbia in June 1973, when he learned of the taps. Halperin and his family named ten federal officials as defendants and sought money damages. They alleged "that the wiretap, which was installed during an investigation into public disclosures of confidential information, was prohibited by both the Fourth Amendment and Title III of the Omnibus Crime Control and Safe Streets Act of 1968" (which regulates wiretaps). Both Halperin and the government officials filed motions for summary judgment, and in December 1976 the trial court dismissed all defendants from the case except for three: former President Richard M. Nixon, former Attorney General John N. Mitchell, and former Nixon advisor H. R. Haldeman. The court ruled that Nixon, Mitchell, and Haldeman "had violated the Halperins' Fourth Amendment rights, but not the terms of Title III" and in August 1977 awarded $1 in nominal damages to the Halperin family.

Both the plaintiffs and the defendants appealed. Plaintiffs argued that "the District Court erred in not applying Title III, in awarding only nominal damages, and in granting summary judgment in favor of ... Kissinger." Nixon, Mitchell, and Haldeman argued that they had absolute immunity or qualified immunity. In 1979, the U.S. Court of Appeals for the District of Columbia upheld the district court's ruling on immunity, but reversed the district court's ruling on "Title III, the proper measures of damages, and defendant Kissinger's motion for summary judgment" and remanded to the district court for further proceedings.

== Kissenger apology and dropping of the suit ==
In December 1991, Kissinger issued an apology to Halperin for his role in the wiretap, writing in a letter "It is something if circumstances were repeated I would not do again" and that he accepted moral responsibility for having "acquiesced in the tap." In response, Halperin voluntarily dropped the lawsuit, which had been pending for 19 years; Judge John Helm Pratt formally dismissed the suit in 1992. The New York Times reported that this ended "one of the longest-running feuds in Washington."
