= Indecent exposure in the United States =

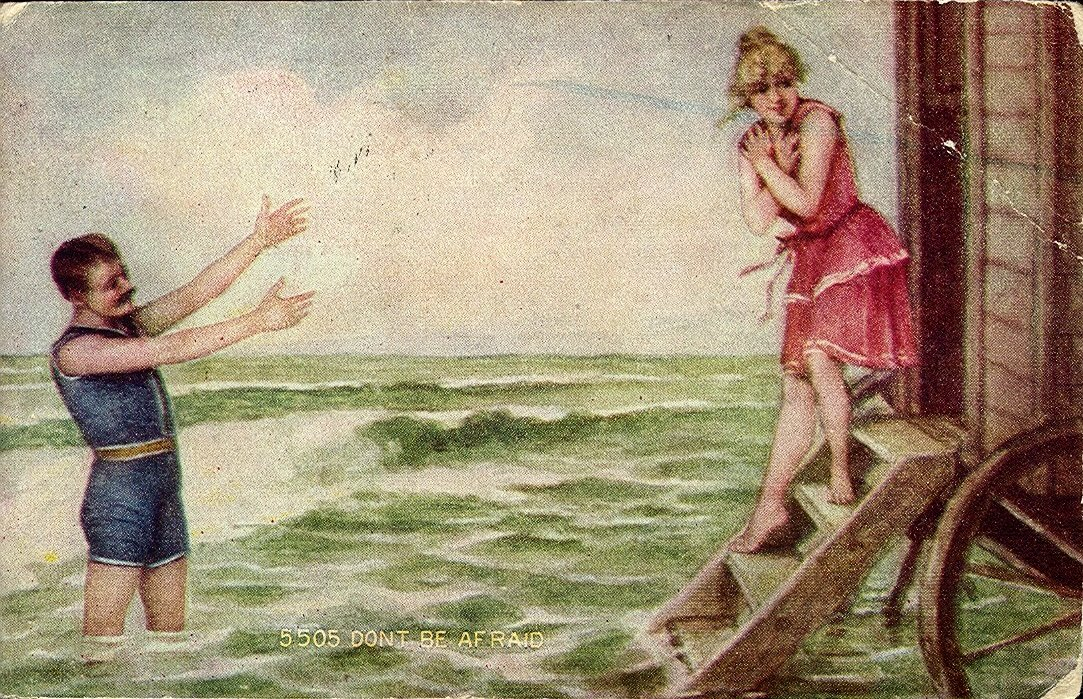
Man and woman in swimsuits, c. 1910; she is exiting a bathing machine

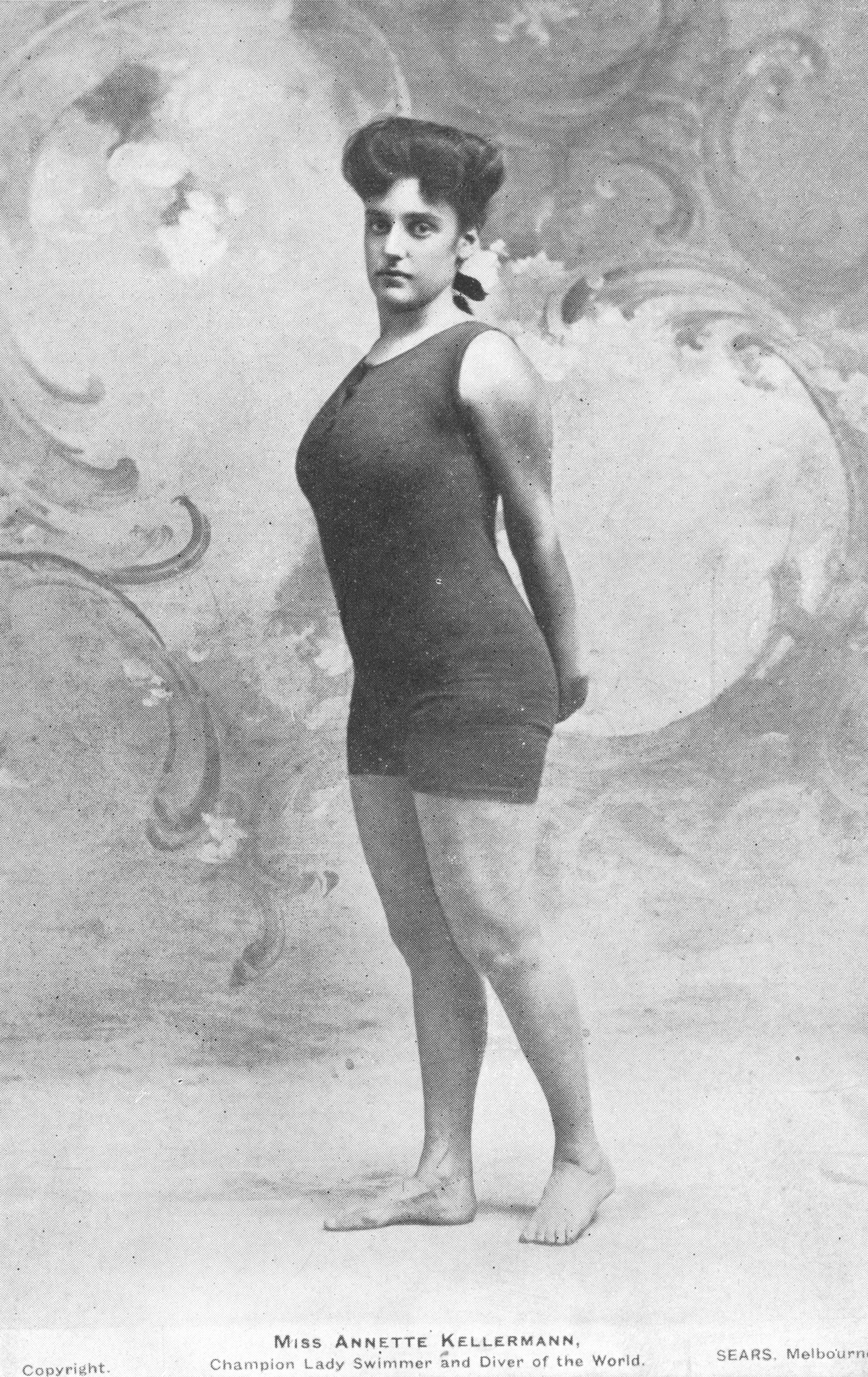
Annette Kellerman, early 1900s, in swimwear which she wore when arrested for public indecency

In the United States, indecent exposure refers to conduct undertaken in a public area or (in some places) publicly viewable location, which is deemed inappropriate in nature, such as nudity, masturbation, or sexual intercourse. Such activity is often illegal. The legal definition in a given location may not specify all activities that would be covered.

Indecent exposure may also be referred to as "sexual misconduct" or "public lewdness".

== Legal status ==
=== History ===
The issue of flashing or indecent exposure in the United States dates to as early as the 1870s as demonstrated in an article from The Sacramento Daily Union published on December 2, 1874, titled "A Shameless Fellow Shot in San Jose", it documents an Italian man from San Jose, California, who wanted to remain anonymous, that was arrested for public indecency, the article states he was "in the habit of standing on the corner of Fourth and Julian Streets in the city, and making an exposure of his person to school children. This morning complaint was made at the police office, and the officers Keane and Vance were detailed to arrest him. About 4 o'clock this afternoon, after the officers had arrested him".

In some areas of the United States in the early 1900s, women were required to wear cumbersome dresses and pantaloon combinations when swimming. In 1907, Annette Kellerman, an Australian swimmer, was arrested on a Boston beach for public indecency for wearing her trademark one-piece swimsuit. After a public outcry at the arrest, the style had become generally acceptable by the 1910s.

=== Laws ===
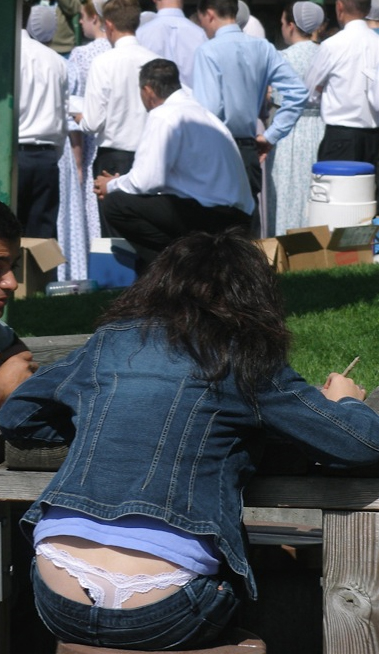
A woman exposing her thong while wearing low rise jeans, which is considered an indecent exposure in some public places

In the United States, states have differing nudity and public decency laws. In one town, Delcambre, Louisiana, the town council voted to penalize those who show their underwear above their pants in public, with those caught doing so would be slated to pay a $500 fine and possibly up to six months in jail, the mayor noted that individuals would be better off "just wearing a dress."

In most states, state law prohibits exposure of the genitals in a public area, while in other states simple nudity is legal, but evidence of intent to shock, arouse or offend other persons (sexual misconduct) is evidence of prohibited conduct. For example, in most states, it is a criminal offense punishable by fines or imprisonment, or registered sex offender requirements and restrictions. Some states permit local governments to set local standards. Public nudity itself has not been a crime throughout California since a 2000 Appellate Court ruling, and prosecutions and convictions are unheard of, but arrests do still occur, though they also are unusual, and Vermont only prohibits "open and gross lewdness and lascivious behavior" so many forms of public nudity are legal. Kansas State Law only prohibits nudity if it is done for the purpose of sexual gratification or arousal, of either the perpetrator or a witness. This came as a shock to some people in the state capital, Topeka, when in 2014, the city police sided with a local man, photographed naked walking around the city.

Indecent exposure is defined as a crime in the United States Armed Forces by Article 120c, Uniform Code of Military Justice. The changes to Article 120c became part of the Manual for Courts-Martial in the 2012 edition.

In Texas, a 2021 law extended indecent exposure to online activity, in which a person sends unsolicited nude or sexual images to another individual. However, the law defined the offense as a lesser misdemeanor than in-person exposure.

==== Exemption for breastfeeding of infants ====
Most states exempt breastfeeding mothers from prosecution under these statutes. U.S. Public Law 106–58 Sec. 647., enacted in 1999, specifically provides that "a woman may breastfeed her child at any location in a Federal building or on Federal property, if the woman and her child are otherwise authorized to be present at the location."

== See also ==
- Clothing laws in the United States
- United States obscenity law
- List of social nudity places in the United States
- Exhibitionism
- Streaking
- Anasyrma
- Mooning
- Ugly Law
