= Consolidated Edison Co. v. Public Service Commission =

- Supreme Court of the United States

Argued March 17, 1980 Decided June 20, 1980
- Full case name: Consolidated Edison Company of New York, Incorporated v. Public Service Commission of New York
- Citations: 447 U.S. 530 (more) 100 S. Ct. 2326; 65 L. Ed. 2d 319; 1980 U.S. LEXIS 6; 6 Media L. Rep. 1518; 34 P.U.R.4th 208

Case history
- Prior: 402 N.Y.S.2d 551 (N.Y. Sup.Ct. 1978); reversed, 407 N.Y.S.2d 735 (N.Y. Sup.Ct.App.Div. 1978); affirmed, 390 N.E.2d 749 (N.Y. 1979)
- Subsequent: On remand, reversed and remanded, 413 N.E.2d 365 (N.Y. 1980)

Holding
- The First Amendment, as applied through the Fourteenth, protects the right of utility companies to include inserts on matters of controversial public policy with billing statements.

Court membership
- Chief Justice Warren E. Burger Associate Justices William J. Brennan Jr. · Potter Stewart; Byron White · Thurgood Marshall; Harry Blackmun · Lewis F. Powell Jr. William Rehnquist · John P. Stevens

Case opinions
- Majority: Powell, joined by Burger, Brennan, Stewart, White, Marshall
- Concurrence: Marshall
- Concurrence: Stevens
- Dissent: Blackmun, joined by Rehnquist (parts I, II)

Laws applied
- U.S. Const. amend. I; N.Y. Pub. Serv. Law §§ 4, 5, 65, 66

Consolidated Edison Co. v. Public Service Commission, 447 U.S. 530 (1980), was a United States Supreme Court decision addressing the free speech rights of public utility corporations under the First Amendment. In a majority opinion written by Justice Lewis Powell, the Court invalidated an order by the New York Public Service Commission that prohibited utility companies from including inserts on controversial matters of public policy with billing statements.

== See also ==
- List of United States Supreme Court cases, volume 447
