= Anti-Obscenity Enforcement Act =

Statute in Alabama that criminalizes the sale of sex toys

Alabama Anti-Obscenity Enforcement Act

Alabama Legislature
- Long title: An Act to repeal Sections 13A-12-150 through 13A-12-159 and Sections 13A-12-170 through 13A-12-179, Code of Alabama 1975; to provide definitions; to define and prohibit the production of, the distribution of, the possession with intent to distribute, and the offer or agreement to produce or distribute obscene material for any thing of pecuniary value; to define and prohibit the public dissemination of obscene material; to define and prohibit the distribution to a minor, the possession with intent to distribute to a minor, the offer or agreement to distribute to a minor, and the display for sale of any material which is harmful to minors; to provide for misdemeanor and felony criminal penalties; to provide for affirmative defenses; to provide for extradition; to provide for the preventing or enjoining by the circuit courts of any violation of this Act; to provide for preliminary and permanent injunctions and for certain im-munities and further to provide that no bond shall be required of the official bringing the action; to provide for the forfeiture and disposition of all obscene material and material which is harmful to minors used, intended to be used, or obtained in violation of the provisions of this act; to provide for the forfeiture and disposition of moneys, negotiable instruments, and funds used, intended to be used, or obtained in any violation of the provisions of this act; to provide for the forfeiture and disposition of proceeds or receipts derived from property which is subject to forfeiture pursuant to the provisions of this act; to provide for the forfeiture of a money judgment amount in lieu of certain property subject to forfeiture; to provide that the Alabama Red Light Abatement Act and Sections 13A-12-190 through 13A-12-198, Code of Alabama 1975, which pertain to obscene materials displaying or depicting children, shall not be repealed, amended, affected, or limited; to provide that city and county ordinances not in conflict with the provisions of this act shall not be repealed by implication; to exclude certain libraries and employees and agents of such libraries from the criminal penalties of this Act; to provide for the punishment under previously existing law of offenses committed prior to the effective date; and to provide for severability and for an effective date.
- Citation: Acts 1989, No. 89-402
- Enacted by: Alabama Legislature
- Signed by: H. Guy Hunt
- Signed: May 2, 1989, 6:20PM
- Effective: May 2, 1989, 6:20PM

Repeals
- Ala. Code 1975, § 13A-12-150 to 13A-12-159, Ala. Code 1975, § 13A-12-170 to 13A-12-179
- Status: Amended

The Anti-Obscenity Enforcement Act of 1989 is an Alabama statute that criminalizes the sale of sex toys. The law has been the subject of extensive litigation and has generated considerable national controversy.

== The statute ==
The statute was originally sponsored by State Senator Tom Butler of Madison, Alabama as a measure to prohibit nude dancing. It prohibits "any person to knowingly distribute, possess with intent to distribute, or offer or agree to distribute any obscene material or any device designed or marketed as useful primarily for the stimulation of human genital organs for any thing of pecuniary value". First-time offenders face a $10,000 fine and a year in prison, while repeat offenders can face up to ten years in prison. Exemptions exist for "bona fide medical, scientific, educational, legislative, judicial or law enforcement purposes".

The law's most outspoken backers have been a coalition of conservative Christians led by Dan Ireland of the Alabama Citizens' Action Program, who defends the law on the grounds that "laws are made to protect the public" and "sometimes you have to protect the public against themselves".

== Legal challenges ==
Sherri Williams, an adult novelty dealer, and the American Civil Liberties Union challenged the statute on constitutional grounds. They argued that the precedent of Lawrence v. Texas, which found a right to engage in consensual homosexual sex, also guaranteed a right to sell sex toys. After initially winning their case, Williams v. Alabama, in federal district court, Williams lost appeals to the 11th Circuit. The Supreme Court decided not to hear the case.

Ross Winner, the owner of Love Stuff, a chain store which sells sex toys, subsequently sued to have the statute declared unconstitutional under the Alabama Constitution. Winner's position is that "A person should have the ability to come in and purchase a sexual device without having to have a reason." The Alabama Supreme Court ruled against him on September 11, 2009, and the statute's ban is now in effect.

State Representative John Rogers of Birmingham has repeatedly introduced legislation to repeal the ban, but each bill has been defeated. However, adult toys continue to be sold as novelty and educational items. Adult clothing is marketed as costumes.

== Public reaction ==
San Francisco radio personality Big Joe Lopez held a protest outside the federal courthouse in Huntsville, Alabama, giving away sex toys to passersby.

=== Toy drive ===
In 2007, Alabama politician Loretta Nall, a former Libertarian Party candidate for governor, launched a well-publicized "toy drive" to send sex toys to Alabama Attorney General Troy King, a staunch defender of the law.

== See also ==
- Texas obscenity statute
