= 2011 term United States Supreme Court opinions of Antonin Scalia =

The 2011 term of the Supreme Court of the United States began October 3, 2011, and concluded September 30, 2012. This was the twenty-sixth term of Associate Justice Antonin Scalia's tenure on the Court.
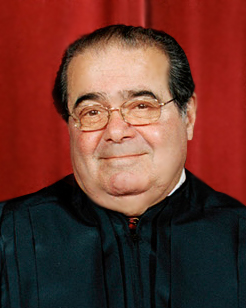

Antonin Scalia 2011 term statistics

8	Majority or plurality	4	Concurrence	0	Other
10	Dissent	1	Concurrence/dissent	Total =	23
Bench opinions = 22		Opinions relating to orders = 1		In-chambers opinions = 0
Unanimous opinions: 3		Most joined by: Thomas (15)		Least joined by: Kennedy, Ginsburg, Breyer, Kagan (6)

Type	Case	Citation	Issues	Joined by	Other opinions
	Greene v. Fisher • [full text]	565 U.S. 34, 35–41 (2011)	Antiterrorism and Effective Death Penalty Act • clearly established Federal law	Unanimous	
Scalia's opinion for the Court interpreted AEDPA's requirement that a federal court can only grant a habeas corpus petition to set aside a state court conviction if the conviction results in a decision "contrary to, or involved an unreasonable application of, clearly established Federal law, as determined by the Supreme Court of the United States." The Court ruled that "clearly established Federal law" does not include Supreme Court decisions that are announced after the last adjudication of the merits in state court but before the defendant's conviction becomes final.
	CompuCredit Corp. v. Greenwood	565 U.S. 95, 96–108 (2012)	Federal Arbitration Act • Credit Repair Organizations Act	Roberts, Kennedy, Thomas, Breyer, Alito	Sotomayor; Ginsburg
	Minneci v. Pollard	565 U.S. 118, 131–32 (2012)	Eighth Amendment • cruel and unusual punishment • privately-run prison • adequate alternative causes of action under state tort law	Thomas	Breyer; Ginsburg
	Gonzalez v. Thaler	565 U.S. 134, 154–70 (2012)	Antiterrorism and Effective Death Penalty Act of 1996 • habeas corpus • statute of limitations		Sotomayor
	Pacific Operators Offshore, LLP v. Valladolid	565 U.S. 207 (2012)	Outer Continental Shelf Lands Act • Longshore and Harbor Workers' Compensation Act • coverage of injury occurring on land	Alito	Thomas
	Maples v. Thomas	565 U.S. 266 (2012)	habeas corpus • excusable procedural default • abandonment by counsel	Thomas	Ginsburg; Alito
	United States v. Jones	565 U.S. 400 (2012)	Fourth Amendment • GPS tracking of suspect's vehicle	Roberts, Kennedy, Thomas, Sotomayor	Alito; Sotomayor
	Reynolds v. United States	565 U.S. 432 (2012)	Sex Offender Registration and Notification Act • applicability to pre-Act offenders	Ginsburg	Breyer
	Cash v. Maxwell • [full text]	565 U.S. 1038 (2012)	Antiterrorism and Effective Death Penalty Act • due process • false testimony • jailhouse informants	Alito	Sotomayor
Scalia dissented from the Court's denial of certiorari, of a Ninth Circuit decision that set aside two murder convictions on the finding that there was significant evidence that a jailhouse informant had lied regarding the defendant's confession. Scalia believed this evidence was circumstantial, as it regarded the informant's lying regarding other matters at the trial and in subsequent unrelated trials, which even the Ninth Circuit acknowledged did not determine that he necessarily lied regarding the confession in this trial. Scalia wrote that this evidence "might permit, but by no means compels, the conclusion that Storch [the informant] fabricated Maxwell's admission," which meant that under AEDPA the convictions should have stood because "[t]he only factual determination necessary to support the California court's decision was that Maxwell had not established that Storch lied." Scalia also took issue with the Ninth Circuit's holding that the use of false testimony violated the Fourteenth Amendment's Due Process Clause, whether or not the prosecution knew it was false. "We have never held that, and are unlikely ever to do so." Scalia closed his opinion with a general note of criticism regarding the Ninth Circuit: "It is a regrettable reality that some federal judges like to second-guess state courts. The only way this Court can ensure observance of Congress's abridgement of their habeas power is to perform the unaccustomed task of reviewing utterly fact-bound decisions that present no disputed issues of law. We have often not shrunk from that task, which we have found particularly needful with regard to decisions of the Ninth Circuit... Today we have shrunk, letting stand a judgment that once again deprives California courts of that control over the State's administration of criminal justice which federal law assures."
	Martinez v. Ryan	566 U.S. 1 (2012)	Sixth Amendment • ineffective assistance of counsel • habeas corpus • procedural default of claim required to be raised in state collateral review	Thomas	Kennedy
	Coleman v. Court of Appeals of Md.	566 U.S. 30 (2012)	Family and Medical Leave Act of 1993 • self-care provision • Fourteenth Amendment • abrogation of state sovereign immunity		Kennedy; Thomas; Ginsburg
	Sackett v. EPA	566 U.S. 120 (2012)	Clean Water Act • discharge of pollutants into navigable waters • finality of EPA compliance order under Administrative Procedure Act	Unanimous	Ginsburg; Alito
	Missouri v. Frye	566 U.S. 134 (2012)	Sixth Amendment • ineffective assistance of counsel • failure to inform defendant of plea bargain offer	Roberts, Thomas, Alito	Kennedy
	Lafler v. Cooper	566 U.S. 156 (2012)	ineffective assistance of counsel • rejection of plea bargain as prejudice	Thomas; Roberts (in part)	Kennedy; Alito
	Credit Suisse Securities (USA) LLC v. Simmonds	566 U.S. 221 (2012)	Securities Exchange Act of 1934 • corporate action against insider trading • statute of limitations • equitable tolling	Kennedy, Thomas, Ginsburg, Breyer, Alito, Sotomayor, Kagan	
	Setser v. United States	566 U.S. 231 (2012)	Sentencing Reform Act of 1984 • federal court discretion to order consecutive or concurrent sentences in anticipation of state court sentence	Roberts, Thomas, Alito, Sotomayor, Kagan	Breyer
	Vartelas v. Holder	566 U.S. 257 (2012)	Illegal Immigration Reform and Immigrant Responsibility Act of 1996 • effect of conviction on lawful permanent resident seeking reentry • antiretroactivity principle	Thomas, Alito	Ginsburg
	United States v. Home Concrete & Supply, LLC	566 U.S. 478 (2012)	Internal Revenue Code of 1954 • overstatement of basis in property • statute of limitations for tax deficiency		Breyer; Kennedy
	Freeman v. Quicken Loans, Inc.	566 U.S. 624 (2012)	Real Estate Settlement Procedures Act • applicability in absence of fee splitting	Unanimous	
	RadLAX Gateway Hotel, LLC v. Amalgamated Bank	566 U.S. 639 (2012)	bankruptcy • Chapter 11 • cram down reorganization plan • credit-bidding by secured creditor at asset auction	Roberts, Thomas, Ginsburg, Breyer, Alito, Sotomayor, Kagan	
	Dorsey v. United States	567 U.S. 260 (2012)	Anti-Drug Abuse Act of 1986 • Fair Sentencing Act • mandatory minimum setencing • applicability of post-Act sentencing to pre-Act offenders	Roberts, Thomas, Alito	Breyer
	Arizona v. United States	567 U.S. 387 (2012)	immigration • federal preemption • Arizona SB 1070		Kennedy; Thomas; Alito
	National Federation of Independent Business v. Sebelius	567 U.S. 519 (2012)	Patient Protection and Affordable Care Act • individual mandate • Anti-Injunction Act • Commerce Clause • Necessary and Proper Clause • Medicaid expansion • coercive conditions on federal spending		Roberts; Ginsburg; Thomas
Signed jointly with Kennedy, Thomas, and Alito.
