= 2011 term United States Supreme Court opinions of Ruth Bader Ginsburg =

The 2011 term of the Supreme Court of the United States began October 3, 2011, and concluded September 30, 2012. This was the nineteenth term of Associate Justice Ruth Bader Ginsburg's tenure on the Court.
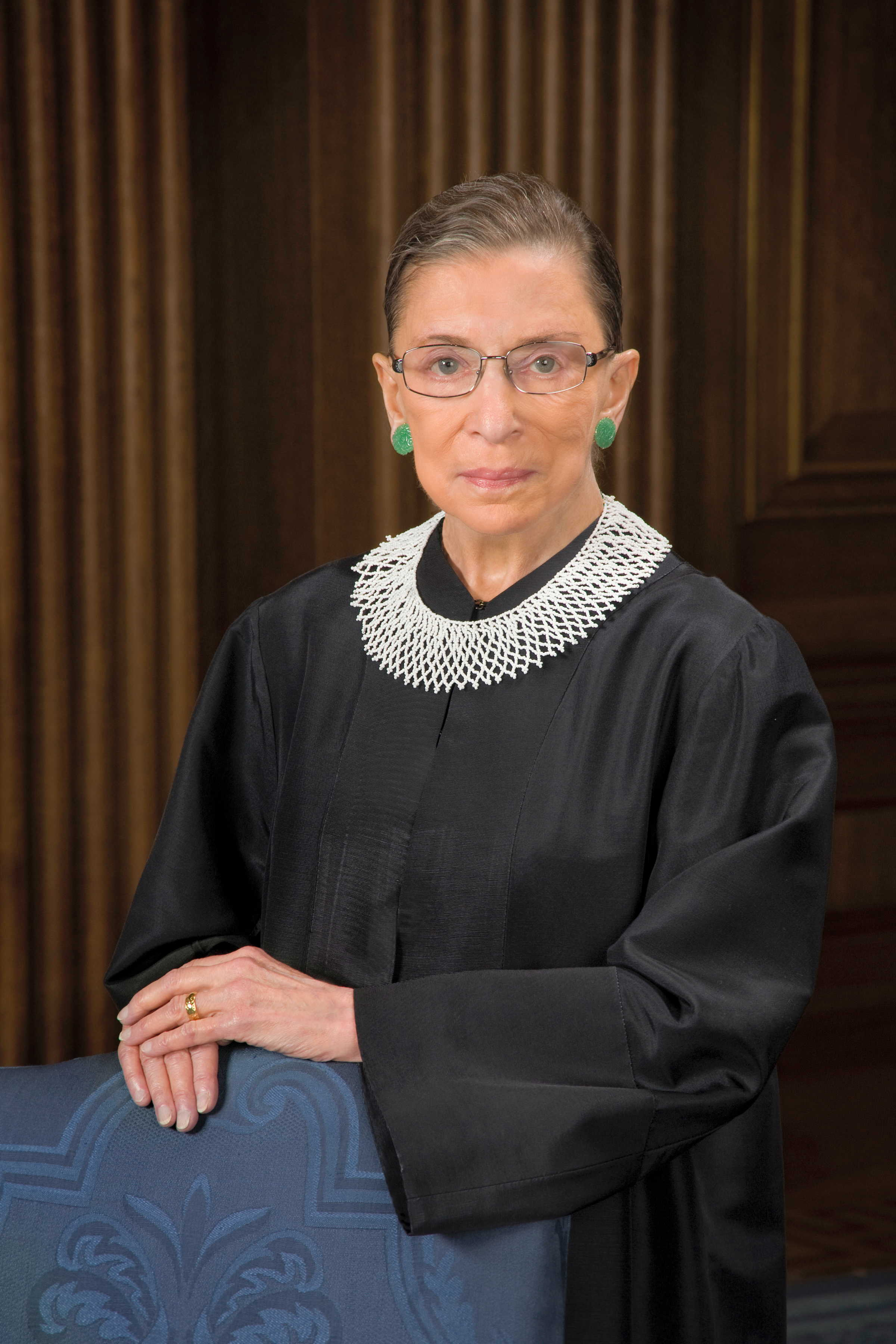

Ruth Bader Ginsburg 2011 term statistics

7	Majority or plurality	5	Concurrence	0	Other
3	Dissent	6	Concurrence/dissent	Total =	21
Bench opinions = 20		Opinions relating to orders = 1		In-chambers opinions = 0
Unanimous opinions: 2		Most joined by: Breyer (13)		Least joined by: Scalia, Thomas (4)

Type	Case	Citation	Issues	Joined by	Other opinions
	Cavazos v. Smith • [full text]	565 U.S. 1 (2011)	Antiterrorism and Effective Death Penalty Act of 1996	Breyer, Sotomayor	per curiam
Ginsburg dissented from the Court's per curiam granting of certiorari and reversal of the Ninth Circuit's judgment (its third in the course of the litigation), believing the Court erred in reviewing "a notably fact-bound case" because it was "bent on rebuking the Ninth Circuit for what it conceives to be defiance of our prior remands...I would not ignore Smith’s plight and choose her case as a fit opportunity to teach the Ninth Circuit a lesson."
	CompuCredit Corp. v. Greenwood	565 U.S. 95 (2012)	Federal Arbitration Act • Credit Repair Organizations Act		Scalia; Sotomayor
	Minneci v. Pollard	565 U.S. 118 (2012)	Eighth Amendment • cruel and unusual punishment • privately-run prison • adequate alternative causes of action under state tort law		Breyer; Scalia
	Perry v. New Hampshire	565 U.S. 228 (2012)	Due Process Clause • eyewitness identification made under suggestible circumstances	Roberts, Scalia, Kennedy, Thomas, Breyer, Alito, Kagan	Thomas; Sotomayor
	Maples v. Thomas	565 U.S. 266 (2012)	habeas corpus • excusable procedural default • abandonment by counsel	Roberts, Kennedy, Breyer, Alito, Sotomayor, Kagan	Alito; Scalia
	Golan v. Holder	565 U.S. 302 (2012)	copyright • Berne Convention • public domain	Roberts, Scalia, Kennedy, Thomas, Sotomayor	Breyer
	Mims v. Arrow Financial Services, LLC	565 U.S. 368 (2012)	Telephone Consumer Protection Act of 1991 • federal question jurisdiction • presumption of concurrent jurisdiction with state courts	Unanimous	
	Kawashima v. Holder	565 U.S. 478 (2012)	immigration law • conviction for false tax return as basis for deportation	Breyer, Kagan	Thomas
	Howes v. Fields	565 U.S. 499 (2012)	Miranda warning • custodial status of prison inmate during interrogation	Breyer, Sotomayor	Alito
	Coleman v. Court of Appeals of Md.	566 U.S. 30 (2012)	Family and Medical Leave Act of 1993 • self-care provision • Fourteenth Amendment • abrogation of state sovereign immunity	Breyer; Sotomayor, Kagan (in part)	Kennedy; Scalia; Thomas
	Roberts v. Sea-Land Services, Inc.	566 U.S. 93 (2012)	Longshore and Harbor Workers' Compensation Act • date of assessment of compensation rate		Sotomayor
	Sackett v. EPA	566 U.S. 120 (2012)	Clean Water Act • discharge of pollutants into navigable waters • finality of EPA compliance order under Administrative Procedure Act		Scalia; Alito
	Vartelas v. Holder	566 U.S. 257 (2012)	Illegal Immigration Reform and Immigrant Responsibility Act of 1996 • effect of conviction on lawful permanent resident seeking reentry • antiretroactivity principle	Roberts, Kennedy, Breyer, Sotomayor, Kagan	Scalia
	Filarsky v. Delia	566 U.S. 46 (2012)	qualified immunity • private individuals temporarily working for government		Roberts; Sotomayor
	Wood v. Milyard	566 U.S. 463 (2012)	habeas corpus • court of appeals raising sua sponte deliberately forfeited statute of limitation defense	Roberts, Kennedy, Breyer, Alito, Sotomayor, Kagan	Thomas
	Astrue v. Capato	566 U.S. 541 (2012)	Social Security • eligibility of posthumously conceived children for survivor's benefits • definition of child under state intestacy law	Unanimous	
	Taniguchi v. Kan Pacific Saipan, Ltd.	566 U.S. 560 (2012)	Court Interpreters Act • document translation expenses as court costs awardable to prevailing parties	Breyer, Sotomayor	Alito
	Reichle v. Howards	566 U.S. 658 (2012)	First Amendment • retaliatory arrest • qualified immunity • Secret Service	Breyer	Thomas
	FCC v. Fox Television Stations, Inc.	567 U.S. 239 (2012)	FCC regulation of indecent broadcasting content • fleeting expletives or nudity • Due Process Clause • void for vagueness doctrine		Kennedy
	National Federation of Independent Business v. Sebelius	567 U.S. 519 (2012)	Patient Protection and Affordable Care Act • individual mandate • Anti-Injunction Act • Commerce Clause • Necessary and Proper Clause • Medicaid expansion • coercive conditions on federal spending	Sotomayor; Breyer, Kagan (in part)	Roberts; Scalia, Kennedy, Thomas, Alito; Thomas
	FCC v. CBS Corp.	567 U.S. 953 (2012)	FCC regulation of indecent broadcasting content • Super Bowl XXXVIII halftime show controversy • fleeting expletives		Roberts
Ginsburg concurred in the Court's denial of certiorari.
