= 2011 term United States Supreme Court opinions of Sonia Sotomayor =

The 2011 term of the Supreme Court of the United States began October 3, 2011, and concluded September 30, 2012. This was the third term of Associate Justice Sonia Sotomayor's tenure on the Court.
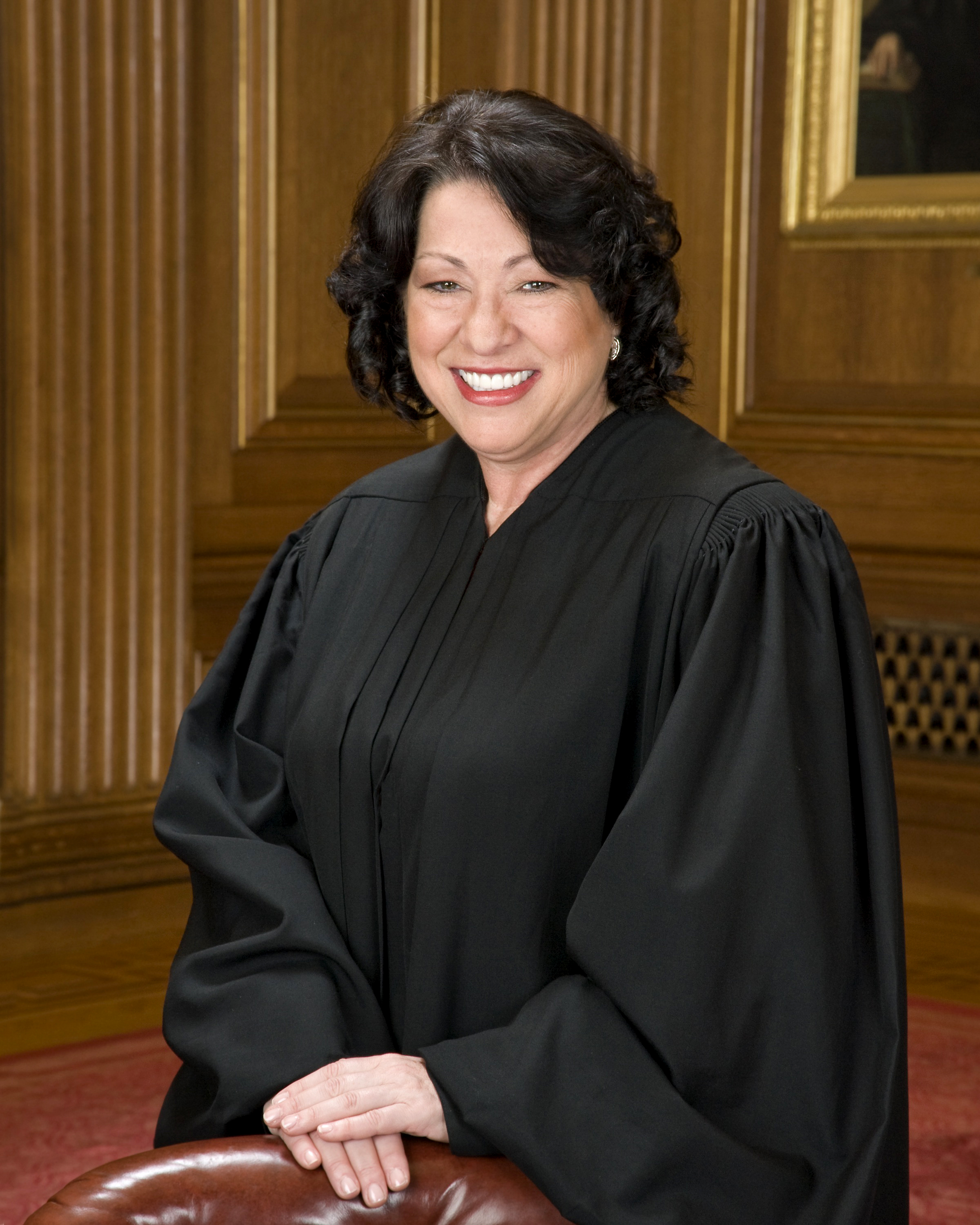

Sonia Sotomayor 2011 term statistics

6	Majority or plurality	7	Concurrence	1	Other
7	Dissent	1	Concurrence/dissent	Total =	22
Bench opinions = 19		Opinions relating to orders = 3		In-chambers opinions = 0
Unanimous opinions: 0		Most joined by: Ginsburg, Kagan (8)		Least joined by: Kennedy, Alito (4)

Type	Case	Citation	Issues	Joined by	Other opinions
	CompuCredit Corp. v. Greenwood	565 U.S. 95 (2012)	Federal Arbitration Act • Credit Repair Organizations Act	Kagan	Scalia; Ginsburg
	Gonzalez v. Thaler	565 U.S. 134 (2012)	Antiterrorism and Effective Death Penalty Act of 1996 • habeas corpus • statute of limitations	Roberts, Kennedy, Thomas, Ginsburg, Breyer, Alito, Kagan	Scalia
	Perry v. New Hampshire	565 U.S. 228 (2012)	Due Process Clause • eyewitness identification made under suggestible circumstances		Ginsburg; Thomas
	United States v. Jones	565 U.S. 400 (2012)	Fourth Amendment • GPS tracking of suspect's vehicle		Scalia; Alito
	Messerschmidt v. Millender	565 U.S. 535 (2012)	Fourth Amendment • law enforcement reliance on overbroad search warrant • qualified immunity	Ginsburg	Roberts; Breyer; Kagan
	Kurns v. Railroad Friction Products Corp.	565 U.S. 625 (2012)	Locomotive Inspection Act • injury from asbestos exposure • state law claims for defective design and failure to warn • federal preemption	Ginsburg, Breyer	Thomas; Kagan
	Buck v. Thaler • [full text]	565 U.S. 1022 (2011)	death penalty	Kagan	Alito
Sotomayor dissented from the Court's denial of certiorari in a case involving the murder conviction and death sentence of an African-American in Texas state court. During the sentencing phase, a psychologist had improperly testified that blacks were more likely to be violent. Though the psychologist was a defense witness called to testify that the defendant would not pose a continuing threat to society behind bars, on cross-examination the prosecution further elicited statements from the psychologist regarding race as a predictor of future violence. In Sotomayor's view, "the salient fact was that the prosecution invited the jury to consider race as a factor in sentencing." Sotomayor also noted that the State had misrepresented to the lower courts the nature of other Texas death sentences that had involved the same psychologist but had already been set for resentencing, and she believed the District Court should have the opportunity to evaluate this case with a clear record. Further reading: AP/The Huffington Post (November 7, 2011), "Duane Buck, Texas Death Row Inmate, Refused Supreme Court Appeal", The Huffington Post
	Cash v. Maxwell • [full text]	565 U.S. 1038 (2012)	Antiterrorism and Effective Death Penalty Act • due process • false testimony • jailhouse informants		Scalia
Sotomayor filed a statement respecting the Court's denial of certiorari. A state court had found there was no credible or persuasive evidence that a jailhouse informant had lied in a murder trial when testifying that the defendant had confessed to him. Sotomayor agreed with the Ninth Circuit's finding that this was unreasonable, in light of voluminous evidence that the informant had lied about confessions in many other trials and had concededly lied about other matters in this trial, and therefore passed the high hurdle for setting aside a state court conviction under AEDPA. Disagreeing with Scalia's dissent, Sotomayor took issue with his characterization of the evidence that the informant lied as merely "circumstantial". She wrote that the dissent "insists that it is possible that Storch [the informant] repeatedly falsely implicated other defendants, and fabricated other material facts at Maxwell's trial, but uncharacteristically told the truth about Maxwell's supposed confession. Of course, that is possible. But it is not reasonable, given the voluminous evidence that Storch was a habitual liar who even the State concedes told other material lies at Maxwell's trial." She also noted that the Ninth Circuit had conducted the proper review under the law, and that the main purpose of granting certiorari is to clarify the law. "Mere disagreement with the Ninth Circuit's highly factbound conclusion is, in my opinion, an insufficient basis for granting certiorari."
	Roberts v. Sea-Land Services, Inc.	566 U.S. 93 (2012)	Longshore and Harbor Workers' Compensation Act • date of assessment of compensation rate	Roberts, Scalia, Kennedy, Thomas, Breyer, Alito, Kagan	Ginsburg
	Zivotofsky v. Clinton	566 U.S. 189 (2012)	political question doctrine • U.S. position on status of Jerusalem • Foreign Relations Authorization Act, Fiscal Year 2003 • passport designation of births in Jerusalem	Breyer (in part)	Roberts; Alito; Breyer
	FAA v. Cooper	566 U.S. 284 (2012)	Privacy Act of 1974 • sovereign immunity • damages for mental or emotional distress	Ginsburg, Breyer	Alito
	Filarsky v. Delia	566 U.S. 377 (2012)	qualified immunity • private individuals temporarily working for government		Roberts; Ginsburg
	Caraco Pharmaceutical Laboratories, Ltd. v. Novo Nordisk A/S	566 U.S. 399 (2012)	pharmaceutical patents • counterclaim by generic drug companies to force correction of patent-holder use code		Kagan
	Kappos v. Hyatt	566 U.S. 431 (2012)	patent law • introduction of new evidence in challenge to denial of patent application	Breyer	Thomas
	Mohamad v. Palestinian Authority	566 U.S. 449 (2012)	Torture Victim Protection Act • liability against organizations	Roberts, Kennedy, Thomas, Ginsburg, Breyer, Alito, Kagan; Scalia (in part)	Breyer
	Hall v. United States	566 U.S. 506 (2012)	bankruptcy • priority of taxation on post-petition sale of farm assets	Roberts, Scalia, Thomas, Alito	Breyer
	Blueford v. Arkansas	566 U.S. 599 (2012)	double jeopardy • retrial after mistrial due to hung jury	Ginsburg, Kagan	Roberts
	Salazar v. Ramah Navajo Chapter	567 U.S. 182 (2012)	Indian Self-Determination and Education Assistance Act • reimbursement of tribal contract support costs for public services • Contract Disputes Act	Scalia, Kennedy, Thomas, Kagan	Roberts
	Match-E-Be-Nash-She-Wish Band of Pottawatomi Indians v. Patchak	567 U.S. 209 (2012)	Indian Reorganization Act • government acquisition of property to provide to Native Americans • sovereign immunity • Quiet Title Act • prudential standing		Kagan
	Knox v. Service Employees	567 U.S. 298 (2012)	mootness due to voluntary cessation • First Amendment • compulsory fees for political lobbying by public sector agency shop	Ginsburg	Alito; Breyer
	Southern Union Co. v. United States	567 U.S. 343 (2012)	Resource Conservation and Recovery Act of 1976 • Sixth Amendment • right to jury determination of facts relating to criminal fines	Roberts, Scalia, Thomas, Ginsburg, Kagan	Breyer
	Fairey v. Tucker	567 U.S. 924 (2012)	Fourteenth Amendment • trial in absentia		
Sotomayor dissented from the Court's denial of certiorari.
