= 2011 term United States Supreme Court opinions of Stephen Breyer =

The 2011 term of the Supreme Court of the United States began October 3, 2011, and concluded September 30, 2012. This was the eighteenth term of Associate Justice Stephen Breyer's tenure on the Court.
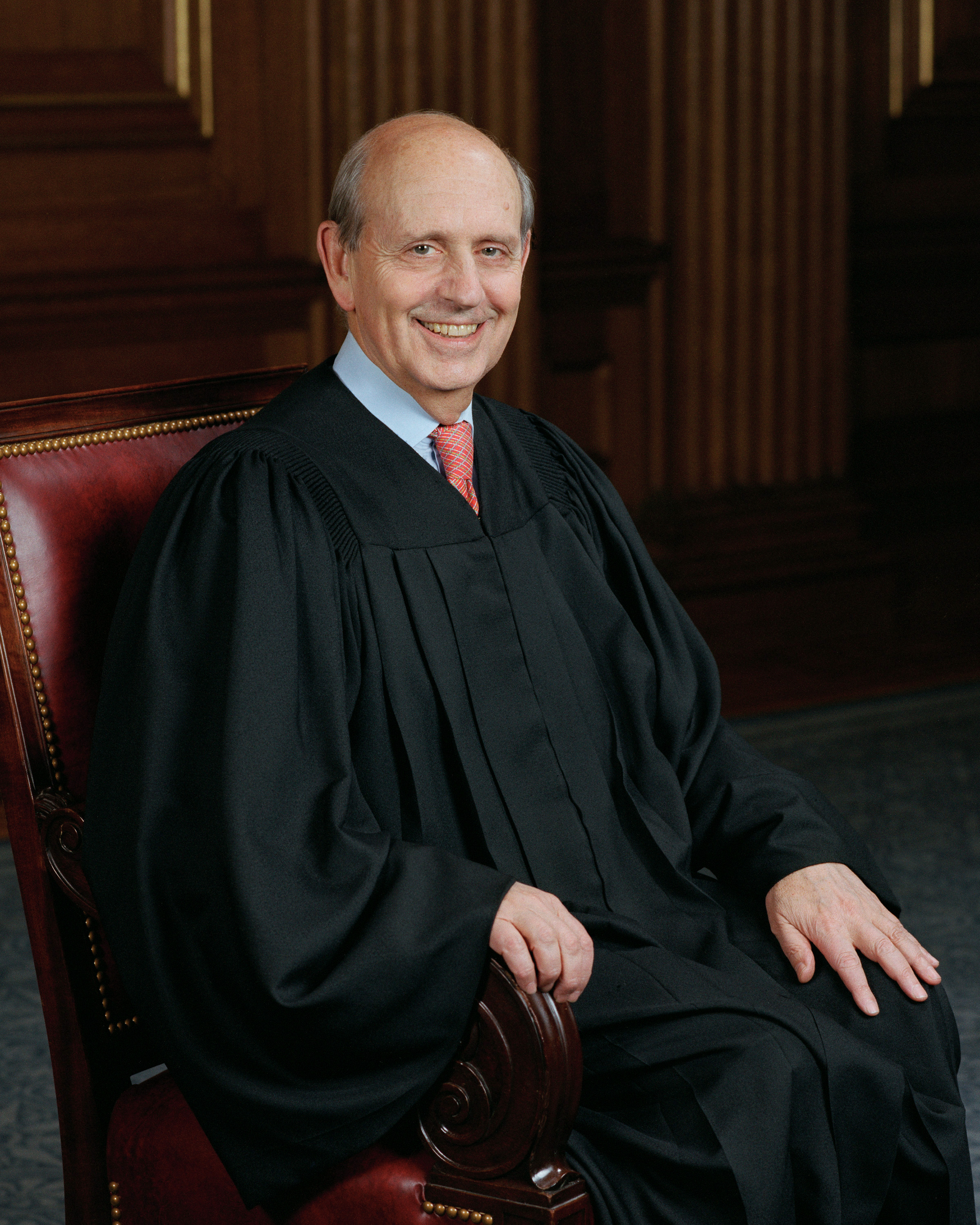

Stephen Breyer 2011 term statistics

7	Majority or plurality	5	Concurrence	0	Other
10	Dissent	0	Concurrence/dissent	Total =	22
Bench opinions = 22		Opinions relating to orders = 0		In-chambers opinions = 0
Unanimous opinions: 1		Most joined by: Kagan (12)		Least joined by: Scalia (2)

Type	Case	Citation	Issues	Joined by	Other opinions
	Minneci v. Pollard	565 U.S. 118 (2012)	Eighth Amendment • cruel and unusual punishment • privately-run prison • adequate alternative causes of action under state tort law	Roberts, Scalia, Kennedy, Thomas, Alito, Sotomayor, Kagan	Scalia; Ginsburg
	Golan v. Holder	565 U.S. 302 (2012)	copyright • Berne Convention • public domain	Alito	Ginsburg
	Reynolds v. United States	565 U.S. 432 (2012)	Sex Offender Registration and Notification Act • applicability to pre-Act offenders	Roberts, Kennedy, Thomas, Alito, Sotomayor, Kagan	Scalia
	Wetzel v. Lambert	565 U.S. 520 (2012)	Brady disclosure • materiality of police notes to witness impeachment	Ginsburg, Kagan	per curiam
	Messerschmidt v. Millender	565 U.S. 535 (2012)	Fourth Amendment • law enforcement reliance on overbroad search warrant • qualified immunity		Roberts; Kagan; Sotomayor
	Douglas v. Independent Living Center of Southern Cal., Inc.	565 U.S. 606 (2012)	Medicaid • state law reduction of payments to providers • review by Centers for Medicare & Medicaid Services • private action to enforce federal reimbursement criteria • Supremacy Clause	Kennedy, Ginsburg, Sotomayor, Kagan	Roberts
	Mayo Collaborative Services v. Prometheus Laboratories, Inc.	566 U.S. 66 (2012)	patent law • laws of nature exemption from patentability • diagnostic test of drug potency	Unanimous	
	Zivotofsky v. Clinton	566 U.S. 189 (2012)	political question doctrine • U.S. position on status of Jerusalem • Foreign Relations Authorization Act, Fiscal Year 2003 • passport designation of births in Jerusalem		Roberts; Alito; Sotomayor
	Setser v. United States	566 U.S. 231 (2012)	Sentencing Reform Act of 1984 • federal court discretion to order consecutive or concurrent sentences in anticipation of state court sentence	Kennedy, Ginsburg	Scalia
	Florence v. Board of Chosen Freeholders of County of Burlington	566 U.S. 318 (2012)	Fourth Amendment • strip searches in jail of arrestees of minor offenses	Ginsburg, Sotomayor, Kagan	Kennedy; Roberts; Alito
	Mohamad v. Palestinian Authority	566 U.S. 449 (2012)	Torture Victim Protection Act • liability of organizations		Sotomayor
	United States v. Home Concrete & Supply, LLC	566 U.S. 478 (2012)	Internal Revenue Code of 1954 • overstatement of basis in property • statute of limitations for tax deficiency	Roberts, Thomas, Alito; Scalia (in part)	Scalia; Kennedy
	Hall v. United States	566 U.S. 506 (2012)	bankruptcy • priority of taxation on post-petition sale of farm assets	Kennedy, Ginsburg, Kagan	Sotomayor
	Armour v. Indianapolis	566 U.S. 673 (2012)	Equal Protection Clause • disparate tax treatment • administrative justifications under rational basis review	Kennedy, Thomas, Ginsburg, Sotomayor, Kagan	Roberts
	Williams v. Illinois	567 U.S. 50 (2012)	Sixth Amendment • Confrontation Clause • expert testimony		Alito; Thomas; Kagan
	Christopher v. SmithKline Beecham Corp.	567 U.S. 142 (2012)	Fair Labor Standards Act • exemption of outside salesmen from overtime regulations • status of pharmaceutical sales representatives	Ginsburg, Sotomayor, Kagan	Alito
	Dorsey v. United States	567 U.S. 260 (2012)	Anti-Drug Abuse Act of 1986 • Fair Sentencing Act • mandatory minimum setencing • applicability of post-Act sentencing to pre-Act offenders	Kennedy, Ginsburg, Sotomayor, Kagan	Scalia
	Knox v. Service Employees	567 U.S. 298 (2012)	mootness due to voluntary cessation • First Amendment • compulsory fees for political lobbying by public sector agency shop		Alito; Sotomayor
	Southern Union Co. v. United States	567 U.S. 343 (2012)	Resource Conservation and Recovery Act of 1976 • Sixth Amendment • right to jury determination of facts relating to criminal fines	Kennedy, Alito	Sotomayor
	Miller v. Alabama	567 U.S. 460 (2012)	Eighth Amendment • Cruel and Unusual Punishment • sentencing of juveniles to life without parole	Sotomayor	Kagan; Roberts; Thomas; Alito
	American Tradition Partnership, Inc. v. Bullock	567 U.S. 516 (2012)	First Amendment • free speech • campaign finance reform • corporate personhood	Ginsburg, Sotomayor, Kagan	per curiam
Breyer dissented from the Court's brief per curiam decision, which held that a Montana state law banning political expenditures by corporations was precluded by Citizens United v. Federal Election Commission. Breyer wrote that he disagreed with the holding in Citizens United and would support reconsidering it. Even accepting that decision, however, Breyer did not believe it precluded a finding that Montana had a compelling state interest in limiting corporate political expenditures in light of the particular "history and political landscape in Montana."
	United States v. Alvarez	567 U.S. 709 (2012)	Stolen Valor Act of 2005 • First Amendment • freedom of speech • protection of false statements	Kagan	Kennedy; Alito
