= 2011 term United States Supreme Court opinions of Clarence Thomas =

The 2011 term of the Supreme Court of the United States began October 3, 2011, and concluded September 30, 2012. This was the twenty-first term of Associate Justice Clarence Thomas's tenure on the Court.
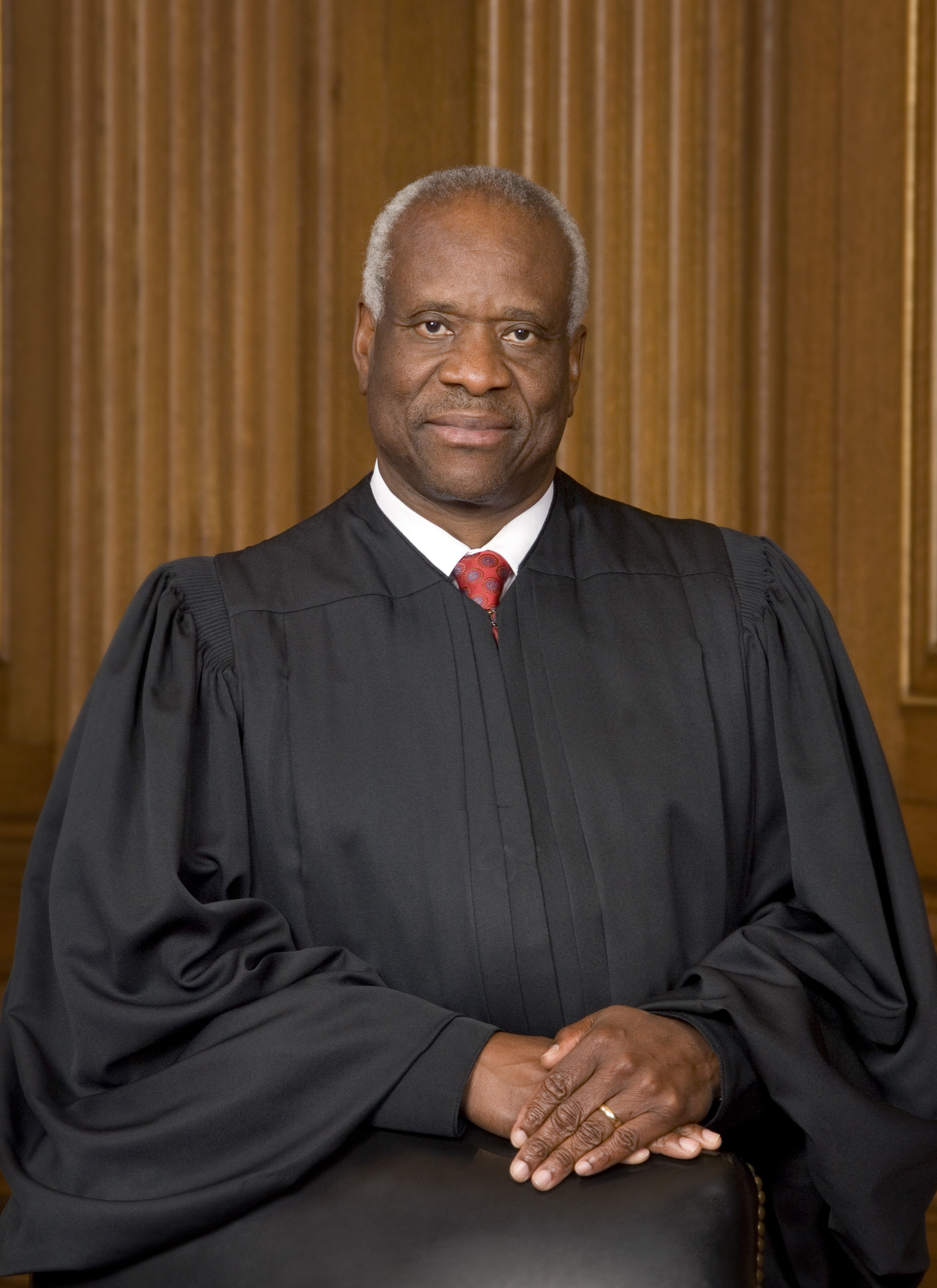

Clarence Thomas 2011 term statistics

6	Majority or plurality	6	Concurrence	0	Other
5	Dissent	1	Concurrence/dissent	Total =	18
Bench opinions = 17		Opinions relating to orders = 1		In-chambers opinions = 0
Unanimous opinions: 1		Most joined by: Scalia (7)		Least joined by: Ginsburg (2)

Type	Case	Citation	Issues	Joined by	Other opinions
	Smith v. Cain	565 U.S. 73 (2012)	Due Process Clause • Brady disclosure • materiality of witness impeachment evidence		Roberts
	Hosanna-Tabor Evangelical Lutheran Church and School v. EEOC	565 U.S. 171 (2012)	Americans with Disabilities Act • First Amendment • ministerial exception to employment discrimination laws		Roberts; Alito
	Pacific Operators Offshore, LLP v. Valladolid	565 U.S. 207 (2012)	Outer Continental Shelf Lands Act • Longshore and Harbor Workers' Compensation Act • coverage of injury occurring on land	Roberts, Kennedy, Ginsburg, Breyer, Sotomayor, Kagan	Scalia
	Perry v. New Hampshire	565 U.S. 228 (2012)	Due Process Clause • eyewitness identification made under suggestible circumstances		Ginsburg; Sotomayor
	Perry v. Perez • [full text]	565 U.S. 388 (2012)	Voting Rights Act of 1965 • preclearance • redistricting		per curiam
Thomas concurred in the Court's vacatur and remand of a District Court's interim redistricting map for Texas, a state that was subject to preclearance requirements for state redistricting plans under section 5 of the Voting Rights Act. While the Court's decision was based upon the District Court's departures from the state's plan that were not based upon legal flaws or other clear standards, Thomas instead believed that section 5 was unconstitutional. Texas should, therefore, have been able to implement its proposed redistricting map for the 2012 election, unless and until there was a finding against it under the alleged violations of section 2 of the Voting Rights Act or the U.S. Constitution.
	Kawashima v. Holder	565 U.S. 478 (2012)	immigration law • conviction for false tax return as basis for deportation	Roberts, Scalia, Kennedy, Alito, Sotomayor	Ginsburg
	Kurns v. Railroad Friction Products Corp.	565 U.S. 625 (2012)	Locomotive Inspection Act • injury from asbestos exposure • state law claims for defective design and failure to warn • federal preemption	Roberts, Scalia, Kennedy, Alito, Kagan	Kagan; Sotomayor
	Utah Highway Patrol v. American Atheists, Inc. • [full text]	565 U.S. 994 (2011)	First Amendment • Establishment Clause • religious displays on government property		
Thomas dissented from the Court's denial of certiorari, in a case in which the placement on public land of large crosses to commemorate the deaths of highway patrol officers was ruled unconstitutional. Thomas criticized the lack of clarity and indeterminacy of the Court's tests for whether such a display violated the First Amendment, and noted what he saw as the confusion and contradictions this caused in lower court rulings. "It is difficult to imagine an area of the law more in need of clarity," Thomas wrote, urging the Court to address this problem even if it did not adopt his view that the Establishment Clause only applied to the Federal Government and only prohibited "actual legal coercion."
	Coleman v. Court of Appeals of Md.	566 U.S. 30 (2012)	Family and Medical Leave Act of 1993 • self-care provision • Fourteenth Amendment • abrogation of state sovereign immunity		Kennedy; Scalia; Ginsburg
	Kappos v. Hyatt	566 U.S. 431 (2012)	patent law • introduction of new evidence in challenge to denial of patent application	Unanimous	Sotomayor
	Wood v. Milyard	566 U.S. 463 (2012)	habeas corpus • court of appeals raising sua sponte deliberately forfeited statute of limitation defense	Scalia	Ginsburg
	Reichle v. Howards	566 U.S. 658 (2012)	First Amendment • retaliatory arrest • qualified immunity • Secret Service	Roberts, Scalia, Kennedy, Alito, Sotomayor	Ginsburg
	Elgin v. Department of Treasury	567 U.S. 1 (2012)	Civil Service Reform Act of 1978 • Merit Systems Protection Board • jurisdiction over constitutional claims by federal employees	Roberts, Scalia, Kennedy, Breyer, Sotomayor	Alito
	Williams v. Illinois	567 U.S. 50 (2012)	Sixth Amendment • Confrontation Clause • expert testimony		Alito; Breyer; Kagan
	Arizona v. United States	567 U.S. 387 (2012)	immigration • federal preemption • Arizona SB 1070		Kennedy; Scalia; Alito
	Miller v. Alabama	567 U.S. 460 (2012)	Eighth Amendment • Cruel and Unusual Punishment • sentencing of juveniles to life without parole	Scalia	Kagan; Breyer; Roberts; Alito
	National Federation of Independent Business v. Sebelius	567 U.S. 519 (2012)	Patient Protection and Affordable Care Act • individual mandate • Anti-Injunction Act • Commerce Clause • Necessary and Proper Clause • Medicaid expansion • coercive conditions on federal spending		Roberts; Ginsburg; Thomas
Signed jointly with Scalia, Kennedy, and Alito.
	National Federation of Independent Business v. Sebelius	567 U.S. 519 (2012)	Patient Protection and Affordable Care Act • individual mandate • Commerce Clause •		Roberts; Ginsburg; Scalia, Kennedy, Thomas, Alito
In addition to the four-justice, jointly-authored dissent, Thomas filed a separate dissent.
