= 2011 term United States Supreme Court opinions of Samuel Alito =

The 2011 term of the Supreme Court of the United States began October 3, 2011, and concluded September 30, 2012. This was the seventh term of Associate Justice Samuel Alito's tenure on the Court.
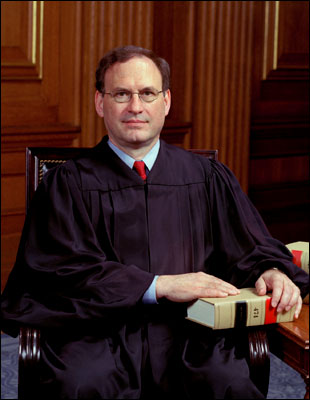

Samuel Alito 2011 term statistics

| 7 | Majority or plurality | 6 | Concurrence | 2 | Other |
| 6 | Dissent | 1 | Concurrence/dissent | Total = | 22 |
| Bench opinions = 19 | | Opinions relating to orders = 3 | | In-chambers opinions = 0 |
| Unanimous opinions: 1 | | Most joined by: Scalia (9) | | Least joined by: Sotomayor (2) |

| Type | Case | Citation | Issues | Joined by | Other opinions |
|---|---|---|---|---|---|
| | Hosanna-Tabor Evangelical Lutheran Church and School v. EEOC | 565 U.S. 171 (2012) | Americans with Disabilities Act • First Amendment • ministerial exception to employment discrimination laws | Kagan | Roberts; Thomas |
| | Maples v. Thomas | 565 U.S. 266 (2012) | habeas corpus • excusable procedural default • abandonment by counsel | | Ginsburg; Scalia |
| | United States v. Jones | 565 U.S. 400 (2012) | Fourth Amendment • GPS tracking of suspect's vehicle | Ginsburg, Breyer, Kagan | Scalia; Sotomayor |
| | Howes v. Fields | 565 U.S. 499 (2012) | Miranda warning • custodial status of prison inmate during interrogation | Roberts, Scalia, Kennedy, Thomas, Kagan | Ginsburg |
| | Buck v. Thaler • [full text] | 565 U.S. 1022 (2011) | death penalty | Scalia, Breyer | Sotomayor |
Alito filed a statement respecting the Court's denial of certiorari in a case involving a murder conviction and death sentence in Texas state court. During the sentencing phase, a psychologist had improperly testified that blacks were more likely to be violent. The psychologist, however, was a defense witness, and his statements elicited during cross-examination on race as a predictor of future violence did not go beyond his direct testimony on the issue. The defendant was, therefore, himself responsible for the introduction of the inappropriate race-related statements . Further reading: AP/The Huffington Post (November 7, 2011), "Duane Buck, Texas Death Row Inmate, Refused Supreme Court Appeal", The Huffington Post
| | Doe v. Reed • [full text] | 565 U.S. 1048 (2011) | disclosure of referendum petitions | | |
Alito dissented from the Court's denial of an injunction, in a case involving a Washington state law that compelled disclosure of referendum petitions. The Court had previously decided in the case to reject a facial challenge to the constitutionality of the law, brought by supporters of a failed petition to bar domestic partnership rights to same-sex couples. On remand, the District Court also rejected the plaintiffs' as-applied challenge, ruling that they were not part of the narrow group that could challenge disclosure, and in the alternative that they had not shown the requisite threatened harm that disclosure would cause. Alito thought the standards the District Court applied were questionable and that important legal issues were raised by the case, for which there had not yet been meaningful appellate review.
| | Sackett v. EPA | 566 U.S. 120 (2012) | Clean Water Act • discharge of pollutants into navigable waters • finality of EPA compliance order under Administrative Procedure Act | | Scalia; Ginsburg |
| | Lafler v. Cooper | 566 U.S. 156 (2012) | ineffective assistance of counsel • rejection of plea bargain as prejudice | | Kennedy; Scalia |
| | Zivotofsky v. Clinton | 566 U.S. 189 (2012) | political question doctrine • U.S. position on status of Jerusalem • Foreign Relations Authorization Act, Fiscal Year 2003 • passport designation of births in Jerusalem | | Roberts; Sotomayor; Breyer |
| | FAA v. Cooper | 566 U.S. 284 (2012) | Privacy Act of 1974 • sovereign immunity • damages for mental or emotional distress | Roberts, Scalia, Kennedy, Thomas | Sotomayor |
| | Florence v. Board of Chosen Freeholders of County of Burlington | 566 U.S. 318 (2012) | Fourth Amendment • strip searches in jail of arrestees of minor offenses | Ginsburg, Sotomayor, Kagan | Kennedy; Roberts; Breyer |
| | Rehberg v. Paulk | 566 U.S. 356 (2012) | Section 1983 • absolute immunity for grand jury witnesses | Unanimous | |
| | Taniguchi v. Kan Pacific Saipan, Ltd. | 566 U.S. 560 (2012) | Court Interpreters Act • document translation expenses as court costs awardable to prevailing parties | Roberts, Scalia, Kennedy, Thomas, Kagan | Ginsburg |
| | Elgin v. Department of Treasury | 567 U.S. 1 (2012) | Civil Service Reform Act of 1978 • Merit Systems Protection Board • jurisdiction over constitutional claims by federal employees | Ginsburg, Kagan | Thomas |
| | Williams v. Illinois | 567 U.S. 50 (2012) | Sixth Amendment • Confrontation Clause • expert testimony | Roberts, Kennedy, Breyer | Thomas; Breyer; Kagan |
| | Christopher v. SmithKline Beecham Corp. | 567 U.S. 142 (2012) | Fair Labor Standards Act • exemption of outside salesmen from overtime regulations • status of pharmaceutical sales representatives | Roberts, Scalia, Kennedy, Thomas | Breyer |
| | Knox v. Service Employees | 567 U.S. 298 (2012) | mootness due to voluntary cessation • First Amendment • compulsory fees for political lobbying by public sector agency shop | Roberts, Scalia, Kennedy, Thomas | Sotomayor; Breyer |
| | Arizona v. United States | 567 U.S. 387 (2012) | immigration • federal preemption • Arizona SB 1070 | | Kennedy; Scalia; Thomas |
| | Miller v. Alabama | 567 U.S. 460 (2012) | Eighth Amendment • Cruel and Unusual Punishment • sentencing of juveniles to life without parole | Scalia | Kagan; Breyer; Roberts; Thomas |
| | National Federation of Independent Business v. Sebelius | 567 U.S. 519 (2012) | Patient Protection and Affordable Care Act • individual mandate • Anti-Injunction Act • Commerce Clause • Necessary and Proper Clause • Medicaid expansion • coercive conditions on federal spending | | Roberts; Ginsburg; Thomas |
Signed jointly with Scalia, Kennedy, and Thomas.
| | United States v. Alvarez | 567 U.S. 709 (2012) | Stolen Valor Act of 2005 • First Amendment • freedom of speech • protection of false statements | Scalia, Thomas | Kennedy; Breyer |
| | Mount Soledad Memorial Assn. v. Trunk | 567 U.S. 944 (2012) | First Amendment • Establishment Clause • religious monument on public land | | |
Alito filed a statement respecting the Court's denial of certiorari.
