= 2011 term United States Supreme Court opinions of John Roberts =

The 2011 term of the Supreme Court of the United States began October 3, 2011, and concluded September 30, 2012. This was the seventh term of Chief Justice John Roberts's tenure on the Court.
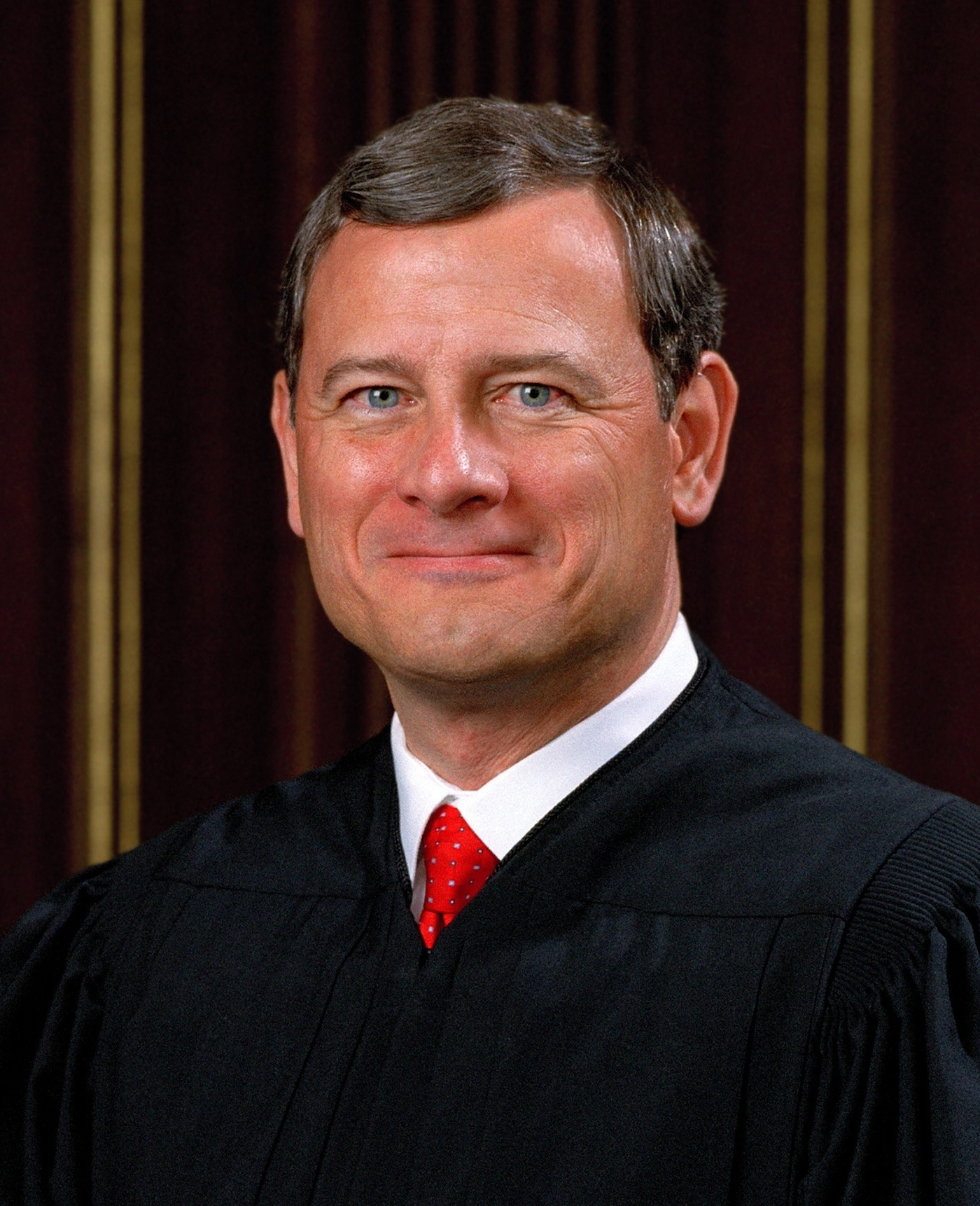

John Roberts 2011 term statistics

7	Majority or plurality	2	Concurrence	1	Other
4	Dissent	0	Concurrence/dissent	Total =	14
Bench opinions = 12		Opinions relating to orders = 1		In-chambers opinions = 1
Unanimous opinions: 2		Most joined by: Scalia, Alito (9)		Least joined by: Sotomayor (4)

Type	Case	Citation	Issues	Joined by	Other opinions
	Smith v. Cain	565 U.S. 73 (2012)	Due Process Clause • Brady disclosure • materiality of witness impeachment evidence	Scalia, Kennedy, Ginsburg, Breyer, Alito, Sotomayor, Kagan	Thomas
	Hosanna-Tabor Evangelical Lutheran Church and School v. EEOC	565 U.S. 171 (2012)	Americans with Disabilities Act • First Amendment • ministerial exception to employment discrimination laws	Unanimous	Thomas; Alito
	Messerschmidt v. Millender	565 U.S. 535 (2012)	Fourth Amendment • law enforcement reliance on overbroad search warrant • qualified immunity	Scalia, Kennedy, Thomas, Breyer, Alito	Breyer; Kagan; Sotomayor
	Douglas v. Independent Living Center of Southern Cal., Inc.	565 U.S. 606 (2012)	Medicaid • state law reduction of payments to providers • review by Centers for Medicare & Medicaid Services • private action to enforce federal reimbursement criteria • Supremacy Clause	Scalia, Thomas, Alito	Breyer
	Zivotofsky v. Clinton	566 U.S. 189 (2012)	political question doctrine • U.S. position on status of Jerusalem • Foreign Relations Authorization Act, Fiscal Year 2003 • passport designation of births in Jerusalem	Scalia, Kennedy, Thomas, Ginsburg, Kagan	Alito; Sotomayor; Breyer
	Florence v. Board of Chosen Freeholders of County of Burlington	566 U.S. 318 (2012)	Fourth Amendment • strip searches in jail of arrestees of minor offenses		Kennedy; Alito; Breyer
	Filarsky v. Delia	566 U.S. 377 (2012)	qualified immunity • private individuals temporarily working for government	Unanimous	Ginsburg; Sotomayor
	Blueford v. Arkansas	566 U.S. 599 (2012)	double jeopardy • retrial after mistrial due to hung jury	Scalia, Kennedy, Thomas, Breyer, Alito	Sotomayor
	Armour v. Indianapolis	566 U.S. 673 (2012)	Equal Protection Clause • disparate tax treatment • administrative justifications under rational basis review	Scalia, Alito	Breyer
	Salazar v. Ramah Navajo Chapter	567 U.S. 182 (2012)	Indian Self-Determination and Education Assistance Act • reimbursement of tribal contract support costs for public services • Contract Disputes Act	Ginsburg, Breyer, Alito	Sotomayor
	Miller v. Alabama	567 U.S. 460 (2012)	Eighth Amendment • Cruel and Unusual Punishment • sentencing of juveniles to life without parole	Scalia, Thomas, Alito	Kagan; Breyer; Thomas; Alito
	National Federation of Independent Business v. Sebelius	567 U.S. 519 (2012)	Patient Protection and Affordable Care Act • individual mandate • Anti-Injunction Act • Commerce Clause • Necessary and Proper Clause • Medicaid expansion • coercive conditions on federal spending	Ginsburg, Breyer, Sotomayor, Kagan (in part)	Ginsburg; Scalia, Kennedy, Thomas, Alito; Thomas
	FCC v. CBS Corp.	567 U.S. 953 (2012)	FCC regulation of indecent broadcasting content • Super Bowl XXXVIII halftime show controversy • fleeting expletives		Ginsburg
Roberts concurred in the Court's denial of certiorari.
	Maryland v. King • [full text]	567 U.S. 1301 (2012)	Fourth Amendment • DNA collection from criminal defendants		
Roberts granted a stay, pending the Supreme Court's disposition of a certiorari peition, of a decision by the Maryland Court of Appeals. The lower court had held a state law providing for the collection of DNA samples from defendants charged with certain crimes violated the Fourth Amendment. Roberts believed that the Court was likely to grant the cert. petition because the Maryland decision conflicted with decisions by the Third and Ninth Circuits and another state supreme court, and that it was likely to reverse the Maryland decision because of the strength of the analyses presented in those other courts' decisions. He also concluded that the decision, like any other that enjoined a statute, subjected Maryland to irreparable harm. Noting that 58 prosecutions had occurred between 2009 and 2011 because of DNA collection from Maryland arrestees, the lower decision also constituted "an ongoing and concrete harm to Maryland's law enforcement and public safety interests." A stay was, therefore, appropriate. See also: Katie's Law
