= 2011 term United States Supreme Court opinions of Elena Kagan =

The 2011 term of the Supreme Court of the United States began October 3, 2011, and concluded September 30, 2012. This was the second term of Associate Justice Elena Kagan's tenure on the Court.
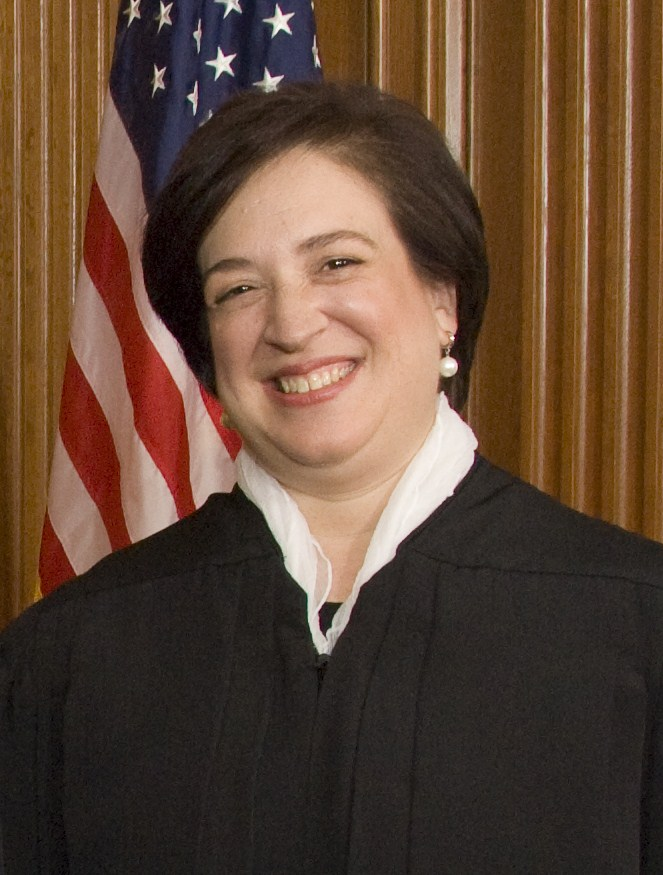

Elena Kagan 2011 term statistics

7	Majority or plurality	1	Concurrence	0	Other
1	Dissent	1	Concurrence/dissent	Total =	10
Bench opinions = 10		Opinions relating to orders = 0		In-chambers opinions = 0
Unanimous opinions: 5		Most joined by: Ginsburg (8)		Least joined by: Roberts, Thomas, Alito (6)

Type	Case	Citation	Issues	Joined by	Other opinions
	Judulang v. Holder • [full text]	565 U.S. 42 (2011)	deportation • discretionary relief • comparable-grounds rule • Administrative Procedure Act	Unanimous	
The Court ruled that the Board of Immigration Appeals' "comparable-grounds rule" was arbitrary and capricious under the Administrative Procedure Act. The rule was used by the agency to determine the eligibility for discretionary relief of a long-term resident alien facing deportation for a past criminal conviction. The comparable-grounds rule asked whether the statutory deportation ground corresponded, in type and breadth, to a statutory exclusion ground under which a long-term resident alien who left the U.S. could be barred from re-entry. "But so what if it does?", the Court asked. "Each of these statutory grounds contains a slew of offenses. Whether each contains the same slew has nothing to do with whether a deportable alien whose prior conviction falls within both grounds merits the ability to seek a waiver." Comparing the comparable-grounds rule to decisionmaking by coin toss, the Court wrote that the rule was "unmoored from the purposes and concerns of the immigration laws. It allows an irrelevant comparison between statutory provisions to govern a matter of the utmost importance—whether lawful resident aliens with longstanding ties to this country may stay here." The rule was made further arbitrary by the fact that an official's choice of which of overlapping statutory deportation grounds covered a particular prior crime would itself determine the outcome of the comparison.
	National Meat Assn. v. Harris	565 U.S. 452 (2012)	Federal Meat Inspection Act • regulation of slaughterhouses • disposition of nonambulatory livestock • federal preemption	Unanimous	
	Messerschmidt v. Millender	565 U.S. 535 (2012)	Fourth Amendment • law enforcement reliance on overbroad search warrant • qualified immunity		Roberts; Breyer; Sotomayor
	Kurns v. Railroad Friction Products Corp.	565 U.S. 625 (2012)	Locomotive Inspection Act • injury from asbestos exposure • state law claims for defective design and failure to warn • federal preemption		Thomas; Sotomayor
	Martel v. Claire	565 U.S. 648 (2012)	habeas corpus • motion to substitute counsel in capital case •	Unanimous	
	Caraco Pharmaceutical Laboratories, Ltd. v. Novo Nordisk A/S	566 U.S. 399 (2012)	pharmaceutical patents • counterclaim by generic drug companies to force correction of patent-holder use code	Unanimous	Sotomayor
	Holder v. Martinez Gutierrez	566 U.S. 583 (2012)	cancellation of removal of alien • imputation to child of parent's continuous residence or lawful permanent residence status	Unanimous	
	Williams v. Illinois	567 U.S. 50 (2012)	Sixth Amendment • Confrontation Clause • expert testimony	Scalia, Ginsburg, Sotomayor	Alito; Thomas; Breyer
	Match-E-Be-Nash-She-Wish Band of Pottawatomi Indians v. Patchak	567 U.S. 209 (2012)	Indian Reorganization Act • government acquisition of property to provide to Native Americans • sovereign immunity • Quiet Title Act • prudential standing	Roberts, Scalia, Kennedy, Thomas, Ginsburg, Breyer, Alito	Sotomayor
	Miller v. Alabama	567 U.S. 460 (2012)	Eighth Amendment • Cruel and Unusual Punishment • sentencing of juveniles to life without parole	Kennedy, Ginsburg, Breyer, Sotomayor	Breyer; Roberts; Thomas; Alito
