= 2011 term United States Supreme Court opinions of Anthony Kennedy =

The 2011 term of the Supreme Court of the United States began October 3, 2011, and concluded September 30, 2012. This was the twenty-fifth term of Associate Justice Anthony Kennedy's tenure on the Court.
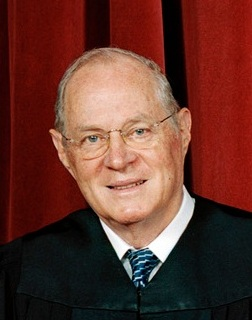

Anthony Kennedy 2011 term statistics

| 9 | Majority or plurality | 0 | Concurrence | 0 | Other |
| 2 | Dissent | 0 | Concurrence/dissent | Total = | 11 |
| Bench opinions = 11 | | Opinions relating to orders = 0 | | In-chambers opinions = 0 |
| Unanimous opinions: 1 | | Most joined by: Roberts, Ginsburg, Sotomayor (7) | | Least joined by: Scalia (3) |

| Type | Case | Citation | Issues | Joined by | Other opinions |
|---|---|---|---|---|---|
| | PPL Montana, LLC v. Montana | 565 U.S. 576 (2012) | title to riverbeds under hydroelectric dams • equal footing doctrine • public trust doctrine | Unanimous | |
| | Martinez v. Ryan | 566 U.S. 1 (2012) | Sixth Amendment • ineffective assistance of counsel • habeas corpus • procedural default of claim required to be raised in state collateral review | Roberts, Ginsburg, Breyer, Alito, Sotomayor, Kagan | Scalia |
| | Coleman v. Court of Appeals of Md. | 566 U.S. 30 (2012) | Family and Medical Leave Act of 1993 • self-care provision • Fourteenth Amendment • abrogation of state sovereign immunity | Roberts, Thomas, Alito | Scalia; Thomas; Ginsburg |
| | Missouri v. Frye | 566 U.S. 134 (2012) | Sixth Amendment • ineffective assistance of counsel • failure to inform defendant of plea bargain offer | Ginsburg, Breyer, Sotomayor, Kagan | Scalia |
| | Lafler v. Cooper | 566 U.S. 156 (2012) | ineffective assistance of counsel • rejection of plea bargain as prejudice | Ginsburg, Breyer, Sotomayor, Kagan | Scalia; Alito |
| | Florence v. Board of Chosen Freeholders of County of Burlington | 566 U.S. 318 (2012) | Fourth Amendment • strip searches in jail of arrestees of minor offenses | Roberts, Scalia, Alito; Thomas (in part) | Roberts; Alito; Breyer |
| | United States v. Home Concrete & Supply, LLC | 566 U.S. 478 (2012) | Internal Revenue Code of 1954 • overstatement of basis in property • statute of limitations for tax deficiency | Ginsburg, Sotomayor, Kagan | Breyer; Scalia |
| | FCC v. Fox Television Stations, Inc. | 567 U.S. 239 (2012) | FCC regulation of indecent broadcasting content • fleeting expletives or nudity • Due Process Clause • void for vagueness doctrine | Roberts, Scalia, Thomas, Breyer, Alito, Kagan | Ginsburg |
| | Arizona v. United States | 567 U.S. 387 (2012) | immigration • federal preemption • Arizona SB 1070 | Roberts, Ginsburg, Breyer, Sotomayor | Scalia; Thomas; Alito |
| | National Federation of Independent Business v. Sebelius | 567 U.S. 519 (2012) | Patient Protection and Affordable Care Act • individual mandate • Anti-Injunction Act • Commerce Clause • Necessary and Proper Clause • Medicaid expansion • coercive conditions on federal spending | | Roberts; Ginsburg; Thomas |
Signed jointly with Scalia, Thomas, and Alito.
| | United States v. Alvarez | 567 U.S. 709 (2012) | Stolen Valor Act of 2005 • First Amendment • freedom of speech • protection of false statements | Roberts, Ginsburg, Sotomayor | Breyer; Alito |
