= 2011 term per curiam opinions of the Supreme Court of the United States =

2011 decisions of the US supreme court

The Supreme Court of the United States handed down fourteen per curiam opinions during its 2011 term, which began October 3, 2011 and concluded September 30, 2012.

Because per curiam decisions are issued from the Court as an institution, these opinions all lack the attribution of authorship or joining votes to specific justices. All justices on the Court at the time the decision was handed down are assumed to have participated and concurred unless otherwise noted.

== Court membership ==
Chief Justice: John Roberts

Associate Justices: Antonin Scalia, Anthony Kennedy, Clarence Thomas, Ruth Bader Ginsburg, Stephen Breyer, Samuel Alito, Sonia Sotomayor, Elena Kagan

== Cavazos v. Smith ==
- Full caption: Javier Cavazos, Acting Warden, v. Shirley Ree Smith
- Citations: 565 U.S. 1
- Prior history: Petition denied, sub nom. Smith v. Mitchell, No. CV-01–4484–ABC (C.D. Cal., Mar. 22, 2004); rev'd, 437 F. 3d 884 (9th Cir. 2006); summarily vacated and remanded, sub nom. Patrick v. Smith, 550 U.S. 915 (2006), judgment reinstated, 508 F. 3d 1256 (9th Cir. 2007) (per curiam); summarily vacated and remanded, 558 U.S. 1143 (2010); judgment reinstated, sub nom. Smith v. Mitchell, 624 F. 3d 1235 (9th Cir. 2010) (per curiam)
- Full text of the opinion: Wikisource official slip opinion

565 U.S. 1
Decided October 31, 2011.
The Court reversed, for the third time, a judgment of the Ninth Circuit that had set aside the conviction of a woman for the death of her infant grandson attributed to shaken baby syndrome (SBS). The Court ruled that the Ninth Circuit's judgment, which had questioned the sufficiency of the expert testimony supporting SBS as the victim's cause of death, was contrary to the deferential standard of review established by the Antiterrorism and Effective Death Penalty Act of 1996 for such petitions.

Ninth Circuit reversed and remanded.

Ginsburg filed a dissent, joined by Breyer and Sotomayor.

Smith's sentence was subsequently commuted by California Governor Jerry Brown to time served, releasing her after a decade in prison.

=== Further reading ===
- Rosenthal, Andrew (November 1, 2011), "Shaken Baby Syndrome", The New York Times (editorial)

== KPMG LLP v. Cocchi ==
- Full caption: KPMG LLP v. Robert Cocchi et al.
- Citations: 565 U.S. 18
- Prior history: Motion to compel arbitration denied, Fla. Cir. Ct., Palm Beach Cty.; aff'd, 51 So. 3d 1165 (Fla. App. 2010)
- Laws applied: 9 U.S.C. § 1, et seq. (Federal Arbitration Act)
- Full text of the opinion: Wikisource official slip opinion · Cornell

565 U.S. 18
Decided November 7, 2011.
The Court vacated a Florida state court judgment refusing to compel arbitration in a lawsuit involving claims brought against auditor KPMG by investors who were defrauded by Bernie Madoff. The Court ruled that the state court erred in determining only that some, but not all, of the claims in the lawsuit were not subject to arbitration, because the Federal Arbitration Act does not permit courts to issue a blanket refusal to compel arbitration simply because some of the claims could be resolved by the court without arbitration.

District Court of Appeal of Florida, Fourth District, vacated and remanded.

== Bobby v. Dixon ==
- Full caption: David Bobby, Warden v. Archie Dixon
- Citations: 565 U.S. 23
- Prior history: Defendant convicted at trial sub. nom. State v. Dixon; affirmed (Ohio App., 1995); affirmed, 2004 Ohio 1585, 101 Ohio St.3d 328, 805 N.E.2d 1042 (2004); habeas petition denied sub nom. Dixon v. Houk, No. 05-01290 (N.D. Ohio, 2005); reversed, 627 F. 3d 553 (6th Cir. 2010)
- Laws applied: U.S. Const. amend. V
- Full text of the opinion: Wikisource official slip opinion · Justia

565 U.S. 23
Decided November 7, 2011.
The Court ruled that the Sixth Circuit erred in setting aside a murder conviction in Ohio state court, because although the defendant's initial confession was given without the warnings required by Miranda v. Arizona, his subsequent confession was voluntary and therefore admissible against him.

Sixth Circuit reversed and remanded.

== Hardy v. Cross ==
- Full caption: Marcus Hardy, Warden v. Irving L. Cross
- Citations: 565 U.S. 65
- Prior history: Petition denied, No. 05-C-5692 (N.D. Ill. 2009); rev'd, 632 F. 3d 356 (7th Cir. 2011)
- Laws applied: U.S. Const. amend. VI
- Full text of the opinion: Wikisource official slip opinion · Justia

565 U.S. 65
Decided December 12, 2011.
The Court reversed the Seventh Circuit's setting aside of a state court criminal conviction for sexual assault, where the alleged victim had been declared an unavailable witness and her testimony from a previous mistrial was admitted. Because the state court's decision to admit the testimony was not an unreasonable application of the Court's Confrontation Clause jurisprudence, the Seventh Circuit's decision failed to give the state court the benefit of the doubt as required by the Antiterrorism and Effective Death Penalty Act.

Though she had testified willingly and was cross-examined at the first trial, which was declared a mistrial, the witness subsequently claimed to fear for her safety and went into hiding, failing to appear for the second trial. The prosecution made numerous and repeated attempts to locate her through her family and friends, and the state trial court, characterizing such efforts as "superhuman," consequently granted its motion to have her declared unavailable and her testimony from the first trial admitted. The defendant was convicted of one of the charges and after losing an appeal in state court, filed a habeas corpus petition in federal court.

The Seventh Circuit ruled that the prosecution had not made the requisite good faith effort to locate the witness, describing particular steps that had not been taken. The Court considered these efforts unlikely to have made a difference, and "the Sixth Amendment does not require the prosecution to exhaust every avenue of inquiry, no matter how unpromising."

Seventh Circuit reversed.

== Perry v. Perez ==
- Full caption: Rick Perry, Governor of Texas, et al. v. Shannon Perez, et al
- Citations: 565 U.S. 388
- Prior history: Interim redistricting ordered, W.D. Tex.; stay granted, probable jurisdiction noted, 565 U.S. 1090 (2011)
- Laws applied: 42 U.S.C. § 1973c(a) (Section 5 of the Voting Rights Act of 1965)
- Full text of the opinion: Wikisource official slip opinion · Justia

565 U.S. 388
Argued January 9, 2012.
Decided January 20, 2012.
The Court vacated and remanded a federal court's interim legislative redistricting in Texas, a state covered by section 5 of the Voting Rights Act for which preclearance of redistricting by the state is required. Due to a significant increase in the state's population recorded in the 2010 census, the state had to redistrict, but in the District Court's view, could not obtain preclearance of its proposed plan in time for the 2012 elections. The District Court accordingly drew an interim district map itself. The Supreme Court found that the District Court's map was not deferential enough to the state's plan and policies, altering it without regard to whether those particular elements of the state's plan were legally flawed or had a reasonable probability of failing preclearance.

Thomas filed an opinion concurring in the judgment, stating that he believed Texas could implement its redistricting plan regardless of its failure to obtain preclearance in time, because in his view, §5 of the Voting Rights Act is unconstitutional.

District Court for the Western District of Texas vacated and remanded.

== Ryburn v. Huff ==
- Full caption: Darin Ryburn, et al. v. George R. Huff, et al.
- Citations: 565 U.S. 469
- Prior history: Judgment for defendants, sub nom. Huff v. City of Burbank, C.D. Cal., 2009 (unreported); reversed in part and remanded, 632 F.3d 539 (9th Cir. 2011)
- Laws applied: U.S. Const. amend. IV
- Full text of the opinion: Wikisource official slip opinion · Justia

565 U.S. 469
Decided January 23, 2012.
The Court reversed the Ninth Circuit's judgment that police officers were not entitled to qualified immunity for entering a private home without a warrant, finding that their belief that violence was imminent, and that a warrantless entry was appropriate, was reasonable under the circumstances.

The police officers were questioning the mother of a student who had been rumored to be planning to shoot other students at school. The mother initially failed to answer the phone, hung up after she did, and after coming outside to speak to the officers, failed to ask them what the questioning was about, and immediately ran back inside when she was asked if there were any guns inside. Finding this behavior alarming, the officers followed her in. No guns were found, and the rumors about the student's intentions turned out to be false.

The family sued the police, alleging under 42 U.S.C. § 1983 that their warrantless entry violated the Fourth Amendment. The District Court entered judgment for the officers, finding that their account of the incident was accurate and ruling that they were entitled to qualified immunity because they reasonably believed that violence was imminent. A divided panel of the Ninth Circuit reversed. Though it accepted the District Court's findings of fact, it instead found that the officers were objectively unreasonable in believing that anyone's safety was at risk, because in their view the mother merely exercised her legal right to end the questioning.

In reversing, the Court criticized the Ninth Circuit for basing its ruling upon a changed version of the facts, as well as for apparently assuming that lawful conduct could not give rise to a legitimate concern that violence was imminent. The Court also stated that the Ninth Circuit failed to look at the totality of the officers' encounter with the mother, instead incorrectly analyzing each step in isolation. Finally, the Ninth Circuit failed to give proper consideration to the perspective of the officers at the scene as events were unfolding, instead viewing the case "with the 20/20 vision of hindsight."

Ninth Circuit reversed and remanded.

== Wetzel v. Lambert ==
- Full caption: John E. Wetzel, Secretary, Pennsylvania Department of Corrections, et al. v. James Lambert
- Citations: 565 U.S. 520
- Prior history: Petition denied, sub nom. Lambert v. Beard, No. 02–9034 (E.D. Pa. July 24, 2007); reversed, 633 F. 3d 126 (3d Cir. 2011)
- Full text of the opinion: official slip opinion · Cornell

565 U.S. 520
Decided February 24, 2012.
Convicted in 1984 and sentenced to death for a robbery, James Lambert filed for habeas corpus due to the discovery of unreleased evidence that the prosecution had failed to disclose to the defense in violation of the decision in Betts v. Brady. A federal appeals court agreed, vacated Lambert's conviction and ordered him released unless the Commonwealth of Pennsylvania retried him within 120 days. The Supreme Court vacated this order and remanded the case for further review, holding that a burden of a retrial three decades after the crime "should not be imposed unless each ground supporting the state court decision is examined and found to be unreasonable under [the Antiterrorism and Effective Death Penalty Act of 1996]."

Third Circuit vacated and remanded.

Breyer filed a dissent, joined by Ginsburg and Kagan.

== Marmet Health Care Center, Inc. v. Brown ==
- Full caption: Marmet Health Care Center, Inc., et al. v. Clayton Brown et al.
- Citations: 565 U.S. 530
- Prior history: Brown v. Genesis Healthcare Corp., No. 35494 (W. Va., June 29, 2011)
- Laws applied: 9 U.S.C. § 1 et seq. (Federal Arbitration Act)
- Full text of the opinion: official slip opinion · Justia

565 U.S. 530
Decided February 21, 2012.
The decision of the state court found the Federal Arbitration Act's coverage to be more limited than mandated by the Supreme Court's previous cases. When the Supreme Court has interpreted federal law, a state court may not contradict or fail to implement the rule so established.

Supreme Court of Appeals of West Virginia vacated and remanded.

== Coleman v. Johnson ==
- Full caption: Brian Coleman, Superintendent, State Correctional Institution at Fayette, et al. v. Lorenzo Johnson
- Citations: 566 U.S. 650
- Prior history: habeas petition denied, sub nom. Johnson v. Mechling, 541 F. Supp. 2d 651 (M.D. Pa. 2008); rev'd, 446 Fed. Appx. 531 (3d Cir. 2011)
- Full text of the opinion: official slip opinion · Justia

566 U.S. 650
Decided May 29, 2012.
Per the standard in Jackson v. Virginia, 443 U.S. 307, a rational jury could find that Johnson intended to kill Williams based on the evidence presented.

Third Circuit reversed and remanded.

== Parker v. Matthews ==
- Full caption: Philip Parker, Warden v. David Eugene Matthews
- Citations: 567 U.S. 37
- Prior history: Petition denied, W.D. Ky.; rev'd, 651 F. 3d 489 (6th Cir. 2011)
- Full text of the opinion: official slip opinion · Cornell

567 U.S. 37
Decided June 11, 2012.
The Antiterrorism and Effective Death Penalty Act of 1996 (AEDPA) prohibits "using federal habeas corpus review as a vehicle to second-guess the reasonable decisions of state courts."

Sixth Circuit reversed and remanded.

== American Tradition Partnership, Inc. v. Bullock ==
- Full caption: American Tradition Partnership, Inc., FKA Western Tradition Partnership, Inc., et al. v. Steve Bullock, Attorney General of Montana, et al.
- Citations: 567 U.S. 516
- Prior history: Summary judgment for plaintiffs, No. BDV 10-238, Mont. Dist. Ct., Lewis and Clark Cty., October 18, 2010; rev'd, Western Tradition Partnership, Inc. v. Attorney General of Montana, 271 P. 3d 1 (Mont. 2011)
- Laws applied: U.S. Const. amend. I; Mont. Code Ann. §13–35–227(1) (2011)
- Full text of the opinion: official slip opinion · Justia

567 U.S. 516
Decided June 25, 2012.
In a case involving a state law prohibiting corporate expenditures that support or oppose a political candidate or party, the Supreme Court reversed the Montana Supreme Court's 2011 holding in Western Tradition Partnership, Inc. v. Attorney General of Montana that the law did not violate the First Amendment. The Court's short opinion stated that "[t]here can be no serious doubt" that the issue had already been decided to the contrary by Citizens United v. Federal Election Commission, 558 U.S. 50 (2010), which struck a similar federal law as unconstitutional. "Montana's arguments in support of the judgment below either were already rejected in Citizens United, or fail to meaningfully distinguish that case."

Breyer filed a dissent, joined by Ginsburg, Sotomayor, and Kagan, writing that he disagreed with the holding in Citizens United. Even accepting that decision, however, Breyer did not believe it precluded a finding that Montana had a compelling state interest in limiting corporate political expenditures in light of the particular "history and political landscape in Montana."

Supreme Court of Montana reversed.

== Tennant v. Jefferson County ==
- Full caption: Natalie E. Tennant, West Virginia Secretary of State, et al. v. Jefferson County Commission, et al.
- Citations: 567 U.S. 758
- Prior history: Judgment for plaintiffs, No. 2:11-cv-0989, S.D. W.Va. (Jan. 3, 2012; amended Jan. 4, 2012); stay granted, 565 U.S. 1175 (2012)
- Laws applied: U.S. Const. art. I, §2; W. Va. Code Ann. §1–2–3 (Lexis 2012 Supp.)
- Full text of the opinion: official slip opinion · Justia

567 U.S. 758
Decided September 25, 2012.
The Court ruled that the federal district court gave the state insufficient deference to its political judgment when it invalidated a legislative redistricting map as contrary to the constitutional principle of "one person, one vote."

District Court for the Southern District of West Virginia reversed and remanded.

=== Further reading ===
- Liptak, Adam (September 25, 2012), "Justices Uphold Map for West Virginia Voting", The New York Times.
- Denniston, Lyle (September 25, 2012), "Opinion recap: Hedging on "one person, one vote"", SCOTUSblog.

== See also ==
- List of United States Supreme Court cases, volume 565
- List of United States Supreme Court cases, volume 566
- List of United States Supreme Court cases, volume 567
