= Pacific Operators Offshore, LLP v. Valladolid =

- Supreme Court of the United States

Decided January 11, 2012
- Full case name: Pacific Operators Offshore, LLP v. Valladolid
- Citations: 565 U.S. 207 (more)

Holding
- The OCSLA extends coverage for injury occurring as the result of operations conducted on the outer continental shelf to an employee who can establish a substantial nexus between his injury and his employer's extractive operations on the Shelf.

Court membership
- Chief Justice John Roberts Associate Justices Antonin Scalia · Anthony Kennedy; Clarence Thomas · Ruth Bader Ginsburg; Stephen Breyer · Samuel Alito; Sonia Sotomayor · Elena Kagan

Case opinions
- Majority: Thomas, joined by Roberts, Kennedy, Ginsburg, Breyer, Sotomayor, Kagan
- Concurrence: Scalia (in part), joined by Alito

Laws applied
- Outer Continental Shelf Lands Act

Pacific Operators Offshore, LLP v. Valladolid, 565 U.S. 207 (2012), was a United States Supreme Court case in which the court held that the Outer Continental Shelf Lands Act extends coverage for injury occurring as the result of operations conducted on the Outer Continental Shelf to an employee who can establish a substantial nexus between his injury and his employer's extractive operations on the Shelf.

== Background ==
Pacific Operators Offshore, LLP (Pacific), operated two oil drilling platforms on the Outer Continental Shelf (OCS) off the California coast and an onshore oil and gas processing facility. Juan Valladolid, an employee, spent 98% of his time working on an offshore platform, but he was killed in an accident while working at the onshore facility. His widow sought benefits under the Longshore and Harbor Workers' Compensation Act (LHWCA), pursuant to the Outer Continental Shelf Lands Act (OCSLA), which extends LHWCA coverage to injuries "occurring as the result of operations conducted on the [OCS]" for the purpose of extracting natural resources from the shelf in 43 U. S. C. §1333(b). The administrative law judge dismissed her claim, reasoning that §1333(b) did not cover Valladolid's fatal injury because his accident occurred on land, not on the OCS. The Labor Department's Benefits Review Board affirmed, but the Ninth Circuit Court of Appeals reversed. Rejecting tests used by the Third and the Fifth Circuits, the Ninth Circuit concluded that a claimant seeking benefits under the OCSLA "must establish a substantial nexus between the injury and extractive operations on the shelf."

== Opinion of the court ==
The Supreme Court issued an opinion on January 11, 2012.
