= List of United States Supreme Court cases, volume 565 =

This is a list of all the United States Supreme Court cases from volume 565 of the United States Reports:

| Case name | Citation | Date decided |
|---|---|---|
| Cavazos v. Smith | 565 U.S. 1 | 2011 |
The Ninth Circuit's judgment, which had questioned the sufficiency of the expert testimony establishing the victim's cause of death, was contrary to the deferential standard of review established by the Antiterrorism and Effective Death Penalty Act of 1996 for habeas petitions.
| KPMG LLP v. Cocchi | 565 U.S. 18 | 2011 |
The state court erred in determining only that some, but not all, of the claims in the lawsuit were not subject to arbitration, because the Federal Arbitration Act does not permit courts to issue a blanket refusal to compel arbitration simply because some of the claims could be resolved by the court without arbitration.
| Bobby v. Dixon | 565 U.S. 23 | 2011 |
Although the defendant's initial confession was given without the warnings required by Miranda v. Arizona, his subsequent confession was voluntary and therefore admissible against him.
| Greene v. Fisher | 565 U.S. 34 | 2011 |
Under AEDPA, "clearly established Federal law, as determined by the Supreme Court of the United States" does not include Supreme Court decisions that are announced after the last adjudication of the merits in state court but before the defendant's conviction becomes final.
| Judulang v. Holder | 565 U.S. 42 | December 12, 2011 |
The Board of Immigration Appeals' comparative-grounds rule is arbitrary and capricious under the Administrative Procedure Act, because its method of determining the eligibility of long-term resident aliens for relief from deportation bears no reasonable relationship to the fitness of the alien to remain in the country or to the policies and purposes of the immigration laws.
| Hardy v. Cross | 565 U.S. 65 | December 12, 2011 |
Because the state court's decision to admit the testimony was not an unreasonable application of the Court's Confrontation Clause jurisprudence, the Seventh Circuit's decision failed to give the state court the benefit of the doubt as required by the Antiterrorism and Effective Death Penalty Act.
| Smith v. Cain | 565 U.S. 73 | January 10, 2012 |
A witness's statements are "plainly material" under Brady v. Maryland when they are the only evidence linking the defendant to the crime.
| CompuCredit Corp. v. Greenwood | 565 U.S. 95 | 2012 |
Because the Credit Repair Organizations Act is silent on whether claims can proceed in an arbitrable forum, the Federal Arbitration Act requires the arbitration agreement to be enforced according to its terms.
| Minneci v. Pollard | 565 U.S. 118 | 2012 |
When state tort law authorizes adequate alternative damages actions—providing both significant deterrence and compensation—no Bivens remedy can be implied.
| Gonzalez v. Thaler | 565 U.S. 134 | 2012 |
Section 2253(c)(3) of AEDPA is a mandatory but nonjurisdictional rule. A certificate of appealability's failure to "indicate" a constitutional issue does not deprive a Court of Appeals of jurisdiction to adjudicate the appeal. For a person incarcerated by a state who does not seek review in that state's highest court, the judgment becomes "final" for purposes of AEDPA's §2244(d)(1)(A) on the date that the time for seeking such review expires.
| Hosanna-Tabor Evangelical Lutheran Church v. EEOC | 565 U.S. 171 | 2012 |
The Establishment and Free Exercise Clauses of the First Amendment bar suits brought on behalf of ministers against their churches claiming termination in violation of employment discrimination laws.
| Pac. Operators Offshore, LLP v. Valladolid | 565 U.S. 207 | 2012 |
The Outer Continental Shelf Lands Act extends coverage for injury occurring as the result of operations conducted on the outer continental shelf to an employee who can establish a substantial nexus between his injury and his employer's extractive operations on the Shelf.
| Perry v. New Hampshire | 565 U.S. 228 | 2012 |
The Due Process Clause of the Fourteenth Amendment does not require a preliminary judicial inquiry into the reliability of an eyewitness identification when the identification was not procured under unnecessarily suggestive circumstances arranged by law enforcement.
| Maples v. Thomas | 565 U.S. 266 | 2012 |
Maples has shown the requisite "cause" to excuse his procedural default due to the abandonment of his attorneys during a critical stage of his appeals.
| Golan v. Holder | 565 U.S. 302 | 2012 |
"Limited time" language of Copyright Clause does not preclude the extension of copyright protections to works previously in the public domain.
| Mims v. Arrow Fin. Serv., LLC | 565 U.S. 368 | 2012 |
Federal and state courts have concurrent jurisdiction over private suits arising under the Telephone Consumer Protection Act of 1991.
| Perry v. Perez | 565 U.S. 388 | 2012 |
Due to a significant increase in the state's population recorded in the 2010 census, the state had to redistrict, but in the District Court's view, could not obtain preclearance of its proposed plan in time for the 2012 elections. The District Court accordingly drew an interim district map itself. The Supreme Court found that the District Court's map was not deferential enough to the state's plan and policies, altering it without regard to whether those particular elements of the state's plan were legally flawed or had a reasonable probability of failing preclearance.
| United States v. Jones | 565 U.S. 400 | 2012 |
The attachment of the GPS device to a vehicle by the police, and its use to monitor the vehicle's movements, constitutes a search under the Fourth Amendment and requires a warrant.
| Reynolds v. United States | 565 U.S. 432 | 2012 |
Pre-SORNA sex offenders are not obligated to register unless the Attorney General specifies applicability.
| Nat'l Meat Ass'n v. Harris | 565 U.S. 452 | 2012 |
The Federal Meat Inspection Act preempts a California statute relating to non-ambulatory animals.
| Ryburn v. Huff | 565 U.S. 469 | 2012 |
The court reversed the Ninth Circuit's judgment that police officers were not entitled to qualified immunity for entering a private home without a warrant, finding that their belief that violence was imminent, and that a warrantless entry was appropriate, was reasonable under the circumstances.
| Kawashima v. Holder | 565 U.S. 478 | 2012 |
Filing a false tax return in violation of 26 U.S.C. Section 7206 qualifies as an aggravated felony under the Immigration and Nationality Act when the Government's revenue loss exceeds $10,000.
| Howes v. Fields | 565 U.S. 499 | 2012 |
1) The Sixth Circuit's own rule could not be the basis for granting a habeas corpus petition, as it was not "clearly established federal law", and 2) the prisoner had not been subject to a custodial interrogation.
| Wetzel v. Lambert | 565 U.S. 520 | 2012 |
The burden of a retrial three decades after the crime should not be imposed unless each ground supporting the state court decision is examined and found to be unreasonable under the Antiterrorism and Effective Death Penalty Act of 1996.
| Marmet Health Care Center, Inc. v. Brown | 565 U.S. 530 | 2012 |
The decision of the state court found the Federal Arbitration Act's coverage to be more limited than mandated by the Supreme Court's previous cases. When the Supreme Court has interpreted federal law, a state court may not contradict or fail to implement the rule so established.
| Messerschmidt v. Millender | 565 U.S. 535 | 2012 |
State officers are entitled to qualified immunity after seizing unrelated evidence from someone who was not under investigation when the error was not immediately apparent based on the text of the search warrant.
| PPL Mont., LLC v. Montana | 565 U.S. 576 | 2012 |
The equal-footing doctrine gives a state title to a segment of a river if that segment was navigable at the time the state enters the union; else, it remained in control of the federal government and could be sold by the government.
| Douglas v. Independent Living Cent. | 565 U.S. 606 | 2012 |
Due to changed circumstances, remanded for consideration of whether a private Supremacy Clause challenge can be made when agency litigation is possible.
| Kurns v. R.R. Friction Products Corp. | 565 U.S. 625 | 2012 |
The state-law design-defect and failure-to-warn claims of this case fell within the field of locomotive equipment regulation preempted by the LIA, as that field was defined in Napier v. Atlantic Coast Line R. Co..
| Martel v. Clair | 565 U.S. 648 | 2012 |
When evaluating motions to substitute counsel in capital cases, courts should employ the same "interests of justice" standard that applies in non-capital cases.
