= Christopher v. SmithKline Beecham Corp. =

- Supreme Court of the United States

Argued April 16, 2012 Decided June 18, 2012
- Full case name: Michael Shane Christopher, et al., Petitioners v. Smithkline Beecham Corporation dba GlaxoSmithKline
- Docket no.: 11-204
- Citations: 567 U.S. 142 (more) 132 S. Ct. 2156; 183 L. Ed. 2d 153; 2012 U.S. LEXIS 4657; 19 WH Cases 2d 257; 80 U.S.L.W. 4463

Case history
- Prior: Summary judgement granted to Glaxo, No. CV-08-1498-PHX-FJM (D. Ariz. 2009); affirmed, 635 F.3d 383 (9th Cir. 2011); cert. granted, 565 U.S. 1057 (2011).

Holding
- The petitioners – pharmaceutical sales representatives whose primary duty is to obtain nonbinding commitments from physicians to prescribe their employer’s prescription drugs in appropriate cases – qualify as outside salesmen under the most reasonable interpretation of the Department of Labor’s regulations.

Court membership
- Chief Justice John Roberts Associate Justices Antonin Scalia · Anthony Kennedy; Clarence Thomas · Ruth Bader Ginsburg; Stephen Breyer · Samuel Alito; Sonia Sotomayor · Elena Kagan

Case opinions
- Majority: Alito, joined by Roberts, Scalia, Kennedy, Thomas
- Dissent: Breyer, joined by Ginsburg, Sotomayor, Kagan

Laws applied
- The Fair Labor Standards Act of 1938; 29 U.S.C. §§ 206-207 (2006 ed. and Supp. IV); 29 U.S.C. § 213(a)(1)

Christopher v. SmithKline Beecham Corp., 567 U.S. 142 (2012), is a US labor law case of the United States Supreme Court. It held that pharmaceutical sales representatives were not eligible for overtime pay. The court ruled in a majority opinion written by Justice Samuel Alito that sales representatives were classified as "outside salesmen" who are exempt from the Department of Labor's regulations regarding overtime pay.

== Facts ==
Michael Christopher and Frank Buchanan worked for GlaxoSmithKline, and claimed overtime pay under the Fair Labor Standards Act. They argued they were employees under 29 USC § 207(a), while GSK contended they were acting ‘in the capacity of outside salesman’ under § 213(a). In turn 29 C.F.R. § 541.500 defined ‘outside salesman’ as ‘any employee’ whose duty was ‘making sales’ under § 203(k) which said that included ‘any sale, exchange, contract to sell’ and so on. Christopher and Buchanan were sales representatives for around four years from 2003, who marketed to physicians to buy the company's products. They spent 40 hours a week calling physicians, and another 10 to 20 hours attending events and performing other miscellaneous tasks. Their pay included a salary and bonus pay, based on performance in selling. In a class action lawsuit, they sought time and a half for over 40 hours work.

The United States District Court for the District of Arizona granted a judgment in favor of GlaxoSmithKline. After the Department of Labor filed an amicus in a related case in the Second Circuit, they appealed to the United States Court of Appeals for the Ninth Circuit in California, which affirmed the lower court's decision. The plaintiffs then appealed to the Supreme Court.

== Judgment ==
Supreme Court held, by a five to four majority, that Christopher and Buchanan were not entitled to overtime pay under the Fair Labor Standards Act, because they were effecting sales within the Act's exception in § 213(a). Justice Alito delivered the opinion of the court, in which Chief Justice Roberts, and Justices Scalia, Kennedy and Thomas joined.

Justice Breyer filed a dissenting opinion, in which Justices Ginsburg, Sotomayor and Kagan joined.

== See also ==
- US labor law
