= Superpriority =

Concept in US bankruptcy law

In United States bankruptcy law, the term superpriority confers the status of a claim being superior to that of other claims. Ultrapriority (summapriority) claims will take precedence over superpriority claims. Superpriority claims can be either secured or unsecured.

Lenders and other creditors that extend credit or provide financing to a debtor during the course of a chapter 11 case do so with the expectation that their claims will be entitled to elevated priority of payment. Even though such claims are generally entitled to certain priority status as "administrative claims," creditors seeking more elevated priorities must ensure that they comply with the Bankruptcy Code's requirements for obtaining this status, so that their claims cannot be undermined due to later developments in the bankruptcy.

Chapter 7 administrative expenses are entitled to priority over Chapter 11 claims granted superpriority status.
