= Subordination (finance) =

Subordination in banking and finance refers to the order of priorities in claims for ownership or interest in various assets.

== United States law ==
=== Subordination of debt ===
Subordination is the process by which a creditor is placed in a lower priority for the collection of its debt from its debtor's assets than the priority the creditor previously had, In common parlance, the debt is said to be subordinated but in reality, it is the right of the creditor to collect the debt that has been reduced in priority. The priority of right to collect the debt is important when a debtor owes more than one creditor but has assets of insufficient value to pay them all in full at the time of a default. Except in bankruptcy proceedings, the creditor with the first priority for collection will generally have the first claim on the debtor's assets for its debt and the creditors whose rights are subordinate will thus have fewer assets to satisfy their claims. Subordination can take place by operation of law or by agreement among the creditors.

=== Subordination of security priority ===
Subordination is also an issue in the priority of security interests in the ownership of property. For example, in real estate, mortgages and other liens on the title to secure the payment or repayment of money usually take their priority from the time they attach to the title. The purpose of this ordering of priority is to determine, in a foreclosure resulting from a default, who gets paid first with the sale proceeds from the foreclosure proceeding. Earlier mortgages or other liens are often subordinated by their holders to later ones in order to accomplish agreed-upon ends. An example is for the holder of a mortgage on undeveloped land to subordinate that mortgage to a later construction loan mortgage. The motivation is either the belief that improvement of the land will benefit the first lender or that the first mortgage requires that it be subordinated to a future construction loan.

The subordination percentage of a security is the percentage of the total capital which is subordinate to the security in question. Thus, the security will not suffer any losses until after that percentage of capital has been lost.

=== Equitable subordination ===
Bankruptcy courts in the United States have the power and authority to subordinate prior claims on the assets of a bankrupt debtor to the claims of junior claimants based on principles of equity. This is a remedy called "equitable subordination." The basis for subordination is usually the inequitable conduct of the prior claimant with respect to junior claimants. Equitable subordination can be used to subordinate both secured and unsecured claims.

== See also ==
- Pari passu
- Subordination agreement
- Senior debt
- Seniority (finance)
- Superpriority
