= CompuCredit Corp. v. Greenwood =

- Supreme Court of the United States

Decided January 10, 2012
- Full case name: CompuCredit Corp. v. Greenwood
- Citations: 565 U.S. 95 (more)

Holding
- Because the Credit Repair Organizations Act is silent on whether claims can proceed in an arbitrable forum, the Federal Arbitration Act requires the arbitration agreement to be enforced according to its terms.

Court membership
- Chief Justice John Roberts Associate Justices Antonin Scalia · Anthony Kennedy; Clarence Thomas · Ruth Bader Ginsburg; Stephen Breyer · Samuel Alito; Sonia Sotomayor · Elena Kagan

Case opinions
- Majority: Scalia
- Concurrence: Sotomayor (in judgment), joined by Kagan
- Dissent: Ginsburg

Laws applied
- Credit Repair Organizations Act; Federal Arbitration Act

CompuCredit Corp. v. Greenwood, 565 U.S. 95 (2012), was a United States Supreme Court case in which the court held that because the Credit Repair Organizations Act is silent on whether claims can proceed in an arbitrable forum, the Federal Arbitration Act requires the arbitration agreement to be enforced according to its terms.

== Background ==
Although the Greenwoods' credit card agreement required their claims to be resolved by binding arbitration, they filed a lawsuit against CompuCredit Corporation and a division of their bank, alleging, among other things, violations of the Credit Repair Organizations Act. The federal District Court denied CompuCredit's motion to compel arbitration, concluding that Congress intended CROA claims to be nonarbitrable. The Ninth Circuit Court of Appeals affirmed.

== Opinion of the court ==
The Supreme Court issued an opinion on January 10, 2012.
