= Reynolds v. United States (2012) =

- Supreme Court of the United States

Argued October 3, 2011 Decided January 23, 2012
- Full case name: Billy Joe Reynolds v. United States
- Citations: 565 U.S. 432 (more)

Case history
- Prior: Certiorari granted January 23, 2012

Holding
- Pre-SORNA sex offenders are not obligated to register unless the Attorney General specifies applicability.

Court membership
- Chief Justice John Roberts Associate Justices Antonin Scalia · Anthony Kennedy; Clarence Thomas · Ruth Bader Ginsburg; Stephen Breyer · Samuel Alito; Sonia Sotomayor · Elena Kagan

Case opinions
- Majority: Breyer, joined by Roberts, Kennedy, Thomas, Alito, Sotomayor, Kagan
- Dissent: Scalia, joined by Ginsburg

Laws applied
- Adam Walsh Child Protection and Safety Act

Reynolds v. United States 565 U.S. 432 (2012) is a United States Supreme Court case in which the court held that Pre-SORNA sex offenders are not obligated to register unless the Attorney General specifies applicability.
