= Kawashima v. Holder =

- Supreme Court of the United States

Argued November 7, 2011 Decided February 21, 2012
- Full case name: Akio Kawashima, et ux., Petitioners v. Eric H. Holder, Jr., Attorney General
- Docket no.: 10-577
- Citations: 565 U.S. 478 (more) 132 S. Ct. 1166; 182 L. Ed. 2d 1; 2012 U.S. LEXIS 1084; 80 U.S.L.W. 4147
- Argument: Oral argument

Case history
- Prior: Appeal of deportation order denied (Bd. Immigr. App., 200?); reversed in part sub nom. Kawashima v. Gonzales, 503 F.3d 997 (9th Cir. 2007, withdrawn); reconsidered and fully reversed sub nom. Kawashima v. Mukasey, 530 F.3d 1111 (9th Cir. 2008, withdrawn); reconsidered anew and affirmed 615 F.3d 1043 (9th Cir. 2010); certiorari granted, 563 U.S. 1007 (2011).

Holding
- Filing a false tax return in violation of 26 U.S.C. Section 7206 qualifies as an aggravated felony under the Immigration and Nationality Act when the Government's revenue loss exceeds $10,000.

Court membership
- Chief Justice John Roberts Associate Justices Antonin Scalia · Anthony Kennedy; Clarence Thomas · Ruth Bader Ginsburg; Stephen Breyer · Samuel Alito; Sonia Sotomayor · Elena Kagan

Case opinions
- Majority: Thomas, joined by Roberts, Scalia, Kennedy, Alito, Sotomayor
- Dissent: Ginsburg, joined by Breyer, Kagan

Kawashima v. Holder, 565 U.S. 478 (2012), is a United States Supreme Court case in which the Court held that "filing a false tax return in violation of 26 U.S.C. Section 7206 qualifies as an aggravated felony under the Immigration and Nationality Act when the Government's revenue loss exceeds $10,000."

== Background ==
Akio and Fusako Kawashima, Japanese nationals who legally resided in the U.S., owned the successful Nihon Seibutsu Kagaku restaurant in Thousand Oaks, California, which filed false tax returns.

== Opinion of the Court ==
In a 6–3 opinion written by Justice Clarence Thomas, the Court held that "filing a false tax return in violation of 26 U.S.C. Section 7206 qualifies as an aggravated felony under the Immigration and Nationality Act when the Government's revenue loss exceeds $10,000."

== See also ==
- Immigration and Nationality Act
