= Dorsey v. United States =

- Supreme Court of the United States

Argued April 17, 2012 Decided June 21, 2012
- Full case name: Edward Dorsey, Sr., Petitioner v. United States and Corey A. Hill, Petitioner v. United States
- Docket no.: 10-699
- Citations: 567 U.S. 260 (more) 132 S. Ct. 2321; 183 L. Ed. 2d 281; 2012 U.S. LEXIS 4664; 80 U.S.L.W. 4500

Case history
- Prior: Defendant convicted, unpubl. n°2:09-cr-20003 (C.D. Ill. 2010); sentence affirmed sub nom. United States v. Fisher, 635 F.3d 336 (7th Cir. 2011); rehearing en banc denied, 646 F.3d 429 (2011, per curiam); Motion for resentencing denied sub nom. United States v. Hill, unpubl. (N.D. Ill., 2010); affirmed 417 F. App'x 560 (7th Cir. 2011)

Holding
- As established by the Fair Sentencing Act of 2010, the lower mandatory minimum sentences for crack cocaine crimes apply to defenders who committed their offenses before the enactment of the law while also being sentenced for their offenses after the effective date of the law.

Court membership
- Chief Justice John Roberts Associate Justices Antonin Scalia · Anthony Kennedy; Clarence Thomas · Ruth Bader Ginsburg; Stephen Breyer · Samuel Alito; Sonia Sotomayor · Elena Kagan

Case opinions
- Majority: Breyer, joined by Kennedy, Ginsburg, Sotomayor, Kagan
- Dissent: Scalia, joined by Roberts, Thomas, Alito

Laws applied
- Fair Sentencing Act of 2010, 124 Stat. 2372

Dorsey v. United States, 567 U.S. 260 (2012), is a Supreme Court of the United States decision in which the Court held that reduced mandatory minimum sentences for "crack cocaine" under the Fair Sentencing Act of 2010 does apply to defendants who committed a crime before the Act went into effect but who were sentenced after that date. The Act's silence on how to apply its new rules, before the effective date or not, caused a split among the Justices on how to interpret its new lenient provisions. Specifically, the case centered on Edward Dorsey, a prior offender who had been convicted of possession before the new rules came into effect, but was sentenced after the effective date.

== Background ==
=== Fair Sentencing Act of 2010 ===
Until the 2010 changes in sentencing guidelines, there existed a significant disparity in how the length of sentences for the possession of crack cocaine and powder cocaine. These changes resulted from reports by the federal Sentencing Commission that the crack-to-powder mandatory minimum ratio of 100-to-1 was too high and unjustified. Along with Congress' acceptance of these proposals in the 2010 Act, Congress also directed the federal Sentencing Commission to "promulgate the guidelines, policy statements, or amendments provided for in this Act as soon as practicable, and in any event not later than 90 days". However, the Act did not say whether it was meant to be retroactive in any respect.

=== Edward Dorsey ===
Edward Dorsey was convicted of unlawfully selling 5.5 grams of crack in 2008. As a prior offender under the pre-2010 sentencing rules, he would have been subject to a 10-year minimum; under the new law, he would have not been subject to any such minimum due to the small nature of his possession. The sentencing judge sentenced Dorsey to the 10-year minimum, applying the old rules because the conviction occurred prior to the effective date of the new law. This was upheld by the Court of Appeals for the Seventh Circuit.

Due to a division among the appellate courts about when to apply the new sentencing guidelines, the Supreme Court granted review.

== Opinion of the Court ==
Justice Stephen Breyer wrote the majority opinion for the Court, reversing the Seventh Circuit, holding that Dorsey should have been sentenced under the new 2010 guidelines. "[N]ot to apply the Fair Sentencing Act," Breyer wrote, "would do more than preserve a disproportionate status quo; it would make matters worse. It would create new anomalies, new sets of disproportionate sentences, not previously present." This reading of the law would be "at odds with Congress' basic efforts to achieve more uniform, more proportionate sentences." Breyer concluded by arguing that "We have no reason to believe Congress would have wanted to impose an unforeseeable, potentially complex application date."

=== Scalia's dissent ===
Justice Antonin Scalia, joined by Chief Justice John G. Roberts and Justices Clarence Thomas and Samuel Alito, dissented from the decision of the Court, arguing that the new more lenient minimums don't apply to pre-2010 offenders. Scalia saw the silence of the Act on retroactivity as a reason that the Court should not apply it themselves. "The canon of constitutional avoidance [has] no application here," Scalia argued, "[for] although many observers viewed the 100-to-1 crack-to-powder ratio under the prior law as having a racially disparate impact, only intentional discrimination may violate the equal protection component of the Fifth Amendment's Due Process Clause."
