= Pottawatomi Indians v. Patchak =

- Supreme Court of the United States

Decided June 18, 2012
- Full case name: Match-E-Be-Nash-She-Wish Band of Pottawatomi Indians v. David Patchak
- Citations: 567 U.S. 209 (more)

Holding
- the United States waived sovereign immunity from the Native American nation's action under the Quiet Title Act. Also, the nation had prudential standing to challenge the acquisition of land by the Department of the Interior.

Court membership
- Chief Justice John Roberts Associate Justices Antonin Scalia · Anthony Kennedy; Clarence Thomas · Ruth Bader Ginsburg; Stephen Breyer · Samuel Alito; Sonia Sotomayor · Elena Kagan

Case opinions
- Majority: Kagan
- Dissent: Sotomayor

Pottawatomi Indians v. Patchak, 567 U.S. 209 (2012), was a United States Supreme Court case in which the court held that the United States waived sovereign immunity from the Native American nation's action under the Quiet Title Act. Also, the nation had prudential standing to challenge the acquisition of land by the Department of the Interior.

== Background ==
The Indian Reorganization Act (IRA) authorizes the Secretary of the Interior to acquire property "for the purpose of providing land to Indians." The Match-E-Be-Nash-She-Wish Band of Pottawatomi Indians (Band), an Indian nation federally recognized in 1999, requested that the Secretary take into trust on its behalf a tract of land known as the Bradley Property, which the Band intended to use "for gaming purposes." The Secretary took title to the Bradley Property in 2009. Respondent David Patchak, who lives near the Bradley Property, filed suit under the Administrative Procedure Act (APA), asserting that Section 465 did not authorize the Secretary to acquire the property because the Band was not a federally recognized tribe when the IRA was enacted in 1934. Patchak alleged a variety of economic, environmental, and aesthetic harms as a result of the Band's proposed use of the property to operate a casino, and requested injunctive and declaratory relief reversing the Secretary's decision to take title to the land. The Band intervened to defend the Secretary's decision. The District Court did not reach the merits of Patchak's suit but ruled that he lacked prudential standing to challenge the Secretary's acquisition of the Bradley Property. The D.C. Circuit reversed and also rejected the Secretary's and the Band's alternative argument that sovereign immunity barred the suit.

== Opinion of the court ==
The Supreme Court issued an opinion on June 18, 2012.
