= Howes v. Fields =

- Supreme Court of the United States

Argued October 24, 2011 Decided February 21, 2012
- Full case name: Carol Howes, Warden, Petitioner v. Randall Lee Fields
- Docket no.: 10-680
- Citations: 565 U.S. 499 (more) 132 S. Ct. 1181, 182 L. Ed. 2d 17
- Argument: Oral argument

Case history
- Prior: Jury trial, conviction, and sentencing, People v. Fields, (2002); affirmed, People v. Fields, No. 246041 (Mich. App. May 6, 2004), leave for appeal denied, 689 N.W.2d 233 (Mich. 2004); writ of habeas corpus conditionally granted, Fields v. Howes, Case Number 2:06-CV-13373 (E.D. Mich. 2009); affirmed, 617 F.3d 813 (6th Cir. 2010)

Holding
- 1) The Sixth Circuit's own rule could not be the basis for granting a habeas corpus petition, as it was not "clearly established federal law", and 2) the prisoner had not been subject to a custodial interrogation.

Court membership
- Chief Justice John Roberts Associate Justices Antonin Scalia · Anthony Kennedy; Clarence Thomas · Ruth Bader Ginsburg; Stephen Breyer · Samuel Alito; Sonia Sotomayor · Elena Kagan

Case opinions
- Majority: Alito, joined by Roberts, Scalia, Kennedy, Thomas, Kagan
- Concur/dissent: Ginsburg, joined by Breyer, Sotomayor

Laws applied
- U.S. Const. amend VI, Miranda v. Arizona, 28 U.S.C. § 2254 (habeas corpus)

Howes v. Fields, 565 U.S. 499 (2012), was a decision by the U.S. Supreme Court that an interrogation of a prisoner was not a custodial interrogation per se, and certainly it was not "clearly established federal law" that it was custodial, as would be required by the Antiterrorism and Effective Death Penalty Act (AEDPA). Instead, the Court said, whether the interrogation was custodial depended on the specific circumstances, and moreover, in the particular circumstances of this case, it was not custodial (that is, he was not "in custody" in a way that was covered by the Miranda v. Arizona decision). This decision overturned the rule of the Sixth Circuit, and denied the prisoner's habeas corpus petition.

== Background ==
Randall Fields was serving a sentence in Lenawee County Jail in Michigan when he was escorted to a conference room and questioned by two sheriff's deputies. The deputies questioned him about a sexual assault that was unrelated to the sentence he was serving. The interrogation began between 7 and 9 PM, lasted until midnight, and at no point was Fields given a Miranda warning. He was told, however, that he was free to leave the conference room and go back to his cell. He was not handcuffed or chained, and he did not ask to go back to his cell or ask for a lawyer, but at one point he did tell the deputies he didn't want to talk to them any more. Returning to his cell would involve waiting about 20 minutes so a guard could arrive to escort him. Fields made statements during the interrogation that would lead to his being prosecuted and convicted for third-degree criminal sexual conduct.

== Procedural History ==
=== Trial and state court appeals ===
In a 2002 case titled People v. Fields, a jury found Fields guilty of two counts of third-degree criminal sexual conduct, and he was sentenced to ten to fifteen years. Fields had made a motion to suppress the statements he'd made, on the grounds that he should have been given a Miranda warning, but the trial court denied the motion, saying the interrogation had not been custodial.

Fields appealed to the Michigan Court of Appeals, arguing the motion to suppress should have been granted, that evidence of other sexual acts should have been excluded, and that the judge impermissibly exceeding sentencing guidelines. In 2004, the Court of Appeals upheld the other evidence and the sentence as a matter of state law, and as to the lack of a Miranda warning, it said, "Although defendant was not read his Miranda rights, he was told that he was free to leave the conference room and return to his cell. Defendant never asked to leave." Therefore, he was not "in custody" for the purposes of Miranda.

Fields requested an appeal to the Michigan Supreme Court, but it declined to hear his case.

=== Habeas corpus petition ===
Fields later filed a habeas corpus petition in federal court, making the same arguments as his state court appeal. In a 2009 ruling, the District Court declined to consider his arguments about sentencing or the other evidence (these were state law issues, which could not be considered for a federal habeas corpus petition), but it granted his petition on the grounds of not being given a Miranda warning. The Court compared Fields' interrogation to the 1968 case Mathis v. United States, where a prisoner had been interrogated by an IRS agent; a subsequent conviction was thrown out because there had been no Miranda warning.

The prison warden, Carol Howes, appealed the decision to the Sixth Circuit Court of Appeals on behalf of the state of Michigan. Although the Sixth Circuit did not yet have Miranda-related caselaw about prisoners being interrogated for unrelated crimes, the state cited examples from other circuits where Miranda warnings had not been required. The Court, however, did not find any of these examples relevant, as none involved a prisoner being interrogated alone in a separate room. The Court relied on a recent Sixth Circuit decision, Simpson v. Jackson, which was factually similar, and was controlling precedent for this case:

In both our case and Simpson, "as in Mathis, state agents unaffiliated with the prison isolated an inmate and questioned him about an unrelated incident without first giving Miranda warnings." Moreover, the state court judges in both cases, without even citing Mathis, ruled that statements obtained from such questioning was admissible. And in both cases, the failure to heed Mathis and forego the issuance of Miranda warnings was "improper" and "any resulting statements [should have been] suppressed" by the trial court.

— Fields v. Howes, 617 F.3d at 821 (6th. Cir. 2010) (Judge Dan A. Polster, writing for the majority)

The Court also noted a recent Supreme Court case, Maryland v. Shatzer, which said in part:

Interrogated suspects who have previously been convicted of crime live in prison. When they are released back into the general prison population, they return to their accustomed surroundings and daily routine—they regain the degree of control they had over their lives prior to the interrogation.

— Maryland v. Shatzer, 559 U.S. 98 at 113 (2010) (Justice Scalia, writing for the majority)

Correspondingly, the Court of Appeals stated, "[a] prisoner is in custody when he is removed from his 'normal life' by being taken from his cell to an isolated area, such as a closet or conference room, for the purpose of interrogation."

== Decision of the Supreme Court ==
The state of Michigan appealed to the U.S. Supreme Court, which reversed the Sixth Circuit. The court unanimously held that Fields' habeas corpus petition could not succeed because the application of Miranda to his situation was not "clearly established federal law", and it held by a 6–3 vote that his interrogation had not been custodial.

=== Majority opinion ===
Writing for the majority, Justice Alito addressed two issues: 1) that the AEDPA required that habeas corpus petitions address issues of "clearly established federal law", and the Sixth Circuit's interpretation of Miranda and Mathis did not qualify, and 2) that even if this were a direct appeal instead of a habeas corpus petition, Fields' interrogation could not be considered "custodial."

==== "Clearly established federal law" ====
Habeas corpus petitions are a very old judicial process, dating back to the 12th century in England. More recently, the Antiterrorism and Effective Death Penalty Act of 1996 (AEDPA), codified in 28 U.S.C. § 2254, had imposed particular limits on how federal courts in the U.S. handled habeas corpus petitions from prisoners in state prisons. A writ of habeas corpus can be granted if a state court decision "resulted in a decision that was contrary to, or involved an unreasonable application of, clearly established Federal law, as determined by the Supreme Court of the United States[.]" Considering the application of Miranda to Fields' situation, the Court said:

In this case, it is abundantly clear that our precedents do not clearly establish the categorical rule on which the Court of Appeals relied, i.e., that the questioning of a prisoner is always custodial when the prisoner is removed from the general prison population and questioned about events that occurred outside the prison. On the contrary, we have repeatedly declined to adopt any categorical rule with respect to whether the questioning of a prison inmate is custodial.

— Howes v. Fields, 565 U.S. at 505 (Justice Alito, writing for the majority)

Rather, the Court had consistently relied on case-by-case examination of the circumstances of an interrogation to determine whether it was custodial. The cases that the Sixth Circuit had cited, such as Mathis and Shatzer, had involved their own factual inquiries, and could not be relied on for establishing any categorical rule. The Sixth Circuit was therefore wrong to apply its categorical rule, and was wrong to grant the writ of habeas corpus. This part of the decision was unanimously joined by all nine justices.

==== Custodial interrogation ====
After detailing why the Sixth Circuit's categorical rule was "unsound," the majority said that Fields was not, in fact, in custody for Miranda purposes, primarily because Fields was told he could leave when he wanted:

To be sure, respondent did not invite the interview or consent to it in advance, and he was not advised that he was free to decline to speak with the deputies. The following facts also lend some support to respondent's argument that Miranda's custody requirement was met: The interview lasted for between five and seven hours in the evening and continued well past the hour when respondent generally went to bed; the deputies who questioned respondent were armed; and one of the deputies, according to respondent, "[u]sed a very sharp tone," and, on one occasion, profanity. These circumstances, however, were offset by others. Most important, respondent was told at the outset of the interrogation, and was reminded again thereafter, that he could leave and go back to his cell whenever he wanted.

— Howes v. Fields, 565 U.S. at 515 (Justice Alito, writing for the majority)

=== Ginsburg's dissent in part ===
Justice Ginsburg, joined by Justices Breyer and Sotomayor, agreed with the majority that the applicability of Miranda was unclear, and the Sixth Circuit had been wrong to use a categorical rule, and so the habeas corpus petition had to be denied. However, she dissented from the majority's analysis of the circumstances of Fields' interrogation:

Were the case here on direct review, I would vote to hold that Miranda precludes the State's introduction of Fields's confession as evidence against him ... I would not train, as the Court does, on the question whether there can be custody within custody. Instead, I would ask, as Miranda put it, whether Fields was subjected to "incommunicado interrogation ... in a police-dominated atmosphere," whether he was placed, against his will, in an inherently stressful situation, and whether his "freedom of action [was] curtailed in any significant way." Those should be the key questions, and to each I would answer "Yes."

— Howes v. Fields, 565 U.S. at 518 (Justice Ginsburg, concurring in part and dissenting in part) (citations omitted)

== See also ==
- Miranda v. Arizona
- Maryland v. Shatzer
- Illinois v. Perkins
- Habeas corpus in the United States
