= Gonzalez v. Thaler =

- Supreme Court of the United States

Decided January 10, 2012
- Full case name: Gonzalez v. Thaler
- Citations: 565 U.S. 134 (more)

Holding
- Section 2253(c)(3) of AEDPA is a mandatory but nonjurisdictional rule. A certificate of appealability's failure to "indicate" a constitutional issue does not deprive a Court of Appeals of jurisdiction to adjudicate the appeal. For a person incarcerated by a state who does not seek review in that state's highest court, the judgment becomes "final" for purposes of AEDPA's §2244(d)(1)(A) on the date that the time for seeking such review expires.

Court membership
- Chief Justice John Roberts Associate Justices Antonin Scalia · Anthony Kennedy; Clarence Thomas · Ruth Bader Ginsburg; Stephen Breyer · Samuel Alito; Sonia Sotomayor · Elena Kagan

Case opinions
- Majority: Sotomayor
- Dissent: Scalia

Gonzalez v. Thaler, 565 U.S. 134 (2012), was a United States Supreme Court case in which the court held that Section 2253(c)(3) of the Antiterrorism and Effective Death Penalty Act of 1996 is a mandatory but nonjurisdictional rule. A certificate of appealability's failure to "indicate" a constitutional issue does not deprive a Court of Appeals of jurisdiction to adjudicate the appeal. For a person incarcerated by a state who does not seek review in that state's highest court, the judgment becomes "final" for purposes of AEDPA's Section 2244(d)(1)(A) on the date that the time for seeking such review expires.

== Background ==
After the intermediate state appellate court affirmed his state-court conviction, Rafael Arriaza Gonzalez allowed his time for seeking discretionary review with the state's highest court for criminal appeals to expire. Roughly six weeks later, the intermediate state appellate court issued its mandate. When Gonzalez subsequently sought federal habeas corpus relief, the federal district court dismissed Gonzalez's petition as time barred by the 1-year statute of limitations in the Antiterrorism and Effective Death Penalty Act of 1996 (AEDPA). Under AEDPA's Section 2244(d)(1)(A), state prisoners have one year to file federal habeas petitions running from "the date on which the judgment became final by the conclusion of direct review or the expiration of the time for seeking such review." The district court held that Gonzalez's judgment had become "final" when his time for seeking discretionary review in the State's highest court expired, and that running the limitations period from that date, his petition was untimely.

Under AEDPA, a habeas petitioner must obtain a certificate of appealability (COA) to appeal a district court's final order in a habeas proceeding. The COA may issue only if the petitioner has made a "substantial showing of the denial of a constitutional right," Section 2253(c)(2), and "shall indicate which specific issue" satisfies that showing, Section 2253(c)(3). A Fifth Circuit judge granted Gonzalez a COA on the question whether his petition was timely. The issued COA, however, failed to "indicate" a constitutional issue.

== Opinion of the court ==
The Supreme Court issued an opinion on January 10, 2012.
