= Minneci v. Pollard =

- Supreme Court of the United States

Decided January 10, 2012
- Full case name: Minneci v. Pollard
- Citations: 565 U.S. 118 (more)

Holding
- When state tort law authorizes adequate alternative damages actions—providing both significant deterrence and compensation—no Bivens remedy can be implied.

Court membership
- Chief Justice John Roberts Associate Justices Antonin Scalia · Anthony Kennedy; Clarence Thomas · Ruth Bader Ginsburg; Stephen Breyer · Samuel Alito; Sonia Sotomayor · Elena Kagan

Case opinions
- Majority: Breyer
- Concurrence: Scalia, joined by Thomas
- Dissent: Ginsburg

Minneci v. Pollard, 565 U.S. 118 (2012), was a United States Supreme Court case in which the court held that, when state tort law authorizes adequate alternative damages actions—providing both significant deterrence and compensation—no Bivens remedy can be implied.

== Background ==
Richard Lee Pollard sought damages from employees at a privately run federal prison in California, claiming that they had deprived him of adequate medical care in violation of the Eighth Amendment's prohibition against cruel and unusual punishment. The federal district court dismissed the complaint, ruling that the Eighth Amendment does not imply an action under Bivens v. Six Unknown Named Agents against a privately managed prison's personnel. The Ninth Circuit Court of Appeals reversed.

== Opinion of the Court ==
The court issued an opinion on January 10, 2012.
