= Filarsky v. Delia =

- Supreme Court of the United States

Decided April 17, 2012
- Full case name: Filarsky v. Delia
- Citations: 566 U.S. 377 (more)

Holding
- A private contractor temporarily retained by the government to carry out its work is entitled to seek qualified immunity from suit under Section 1983.

Court membership
- Chief Justice John Roberts Associate Justices Antonin Scalia · Anthony Kennedy; Clarence Thomas · Ruth Bader Ginsburg; Stephen Breyer · Samuel Alito; Sonia Sotomayor · Elena Kagan

Case opinions
- Majority: Roberts
- Concurrence: Ginsburg
- Concurrence: Sotomayor

Filarsky v. Delia, 566 U.S. 377 (2012), was a United States Supreme Court case in which the Court held that a private contractor temporarily retained by the government to carry out its work is entitled to seek qualified immunity from suit under Section 1983.

== Background ==
Delia, a firefighter employed by the City of Rialto, California, missed work after becoming ill on the job. Suspicious of Delia’s extended absence, the City hired a private investigation firm to conduct surveillance on him. When Delia was seen buying fiberglass insulation and other building supplies, the City initiated an internal affairs investigation. It hired Filarsky, a private attorney, to interview Delia. At the interview, which Delia's attorney and two fire-department officials also attended, Delia acknowledged buying the supplies, but denied having done any work on his home. To verify Delia's claim, Filarsky asked Delia to allow a fire department official to enter his home and view the unused materials. When Delia refused, Filarsky ordered him to bring the materials out of his home for the official to see. This prompted Delia's attorney to threaten a civil-rights action against the City and Filarsky. Nonetheless, after the interview concluded, officials followed Delia to his home, where he produced the materials.

Delia brought an action under 42 U. S. C. §1983 against the City, the Fire Department, Filarsky, and other individuals, alleging that the order to produce the building materials violated his Fourth and Fourteenth Amendment rights. The federal District Court granted summary judgment to the individual defendants on the basis of qualified immunity. The Court of Appeals for the Ninth Circuit affirmed with respect to all individual defendants except Filarsky, concluding that he was not entitled to seek qualified immunity because he was a private attorney, not a City employee.

== Opinion of the court ==
=== Majority Opinion ===
The Supreme Court issued a majority opinion by Chief Justice Roberts on April 17, 2012. The unanimous decision for Steve A. Filarsky reversed the Ninth Circuit's decision on the matter.

The Court held that discerning part time or temporary government from full time employees, when looking at the history of common law and case law on qualified immunity, was not needed. As Chief Justice Roberts wrote:

The Court of Appeals rejected Filarsky’s claim to the protection accorded Wells, Bekker, and Peel solely because he was not a permanent, full-time employee of the City. The common law, however, did not draw such distinctions, and we see no justification for doing so under §1983.

=== Concurring Opinions ===
Justice Sotomayor and Justice Ginsburg filed separate concurring opinions.

==== Justice Ginsburg ====
Justice Ginsburg, in her concurring opinion, mentioned that when a government worker knew their conduct violates an established right, qualified immunity is overcome. She also noted that although the Court addressed the question for this case with an appropriate response, "the Circuit’s law will remain muddled absent the Court of Appeals’ focused attention to the question whether Filarsky’s conduct violated 'clearly established' law."

==== Justice Sotomayor ====
Justice Sotomayor, in her concurring opinion, clarified that qualified immunity does not protect every private individual who works for the government in every circumstance.
