= Maples v. Thomas =

- Supreme Court of the United States

Argued October 4, 2011 Decided January 18, 2012
- Full case name: Cory S. Maples v. Kim T. Thomas, Commissioner, Alabama Department of Corrections
- Docket no.: 10-63
- Citations: 565 U.S. 266 (more) 132 S. Ct. 912; 181 L. Ed. 2d 807

Case history
- Prior: Conviction affirmed sub nom. Maples v. State, 758 So.2d 1 (Ala. Crim. App. 1999); Ex parte Maples, 758 So.2d 81 (Ala. 1999); denial of petition for postconviction relief affirmer, Ex parte Maples, 885 So.2d 845 (Ala. Crim. App. 2004); petition for habeas corpus relief denied sub nom. Maples v. Campbell, No. 5:03-CV-2399-SLB-PWG (N.D. Ala. September 29, 2006); affirmed sub nom. Maples v. Allen, 586 F.3d 879 (11th Cir. 2009); cert. granted, 562 U.S. 1286 (2011).
- Subsequent: On remand, Maples v. Comm'r of Ala. Dep't of Corr., 460 F. App'x 860 (11th Cir. 2012).

Holding
- Maples has shown the requisite "cause" to excuse his procedural default due to the abandonment of his attorneys during a critical stage of his appeals.

Court membership
- Chief Justice John Roberts Associate Justices Antonin Scalia · Anthony Kennedy; Clarence Thomas · Ruth Bader Ginsburg; Stephen Breyer · Samuel Alito; Sonia Sotomayor · Elena Kagan

Case opinions
- Majority: Ginsburg, joined by Roberts, Kennedy, Breyer, Alito, Sotomayor, Kagan
- Concurrence: Alito
- Dissent: Scalia, joined by Thomas

Maples v. Thomas, 565 U.S. 266 (2012), is a United States Supreme Court ruling in which the Court ruled 7–2 that Cory R. Maples, who had been convicted of murdering two people and faced a possible death sentence, should get another opportunity in court because his lawyers at Sullivan & Cromwell had abandoned him.

Justices Antonin Scalia and Clarence Thomas dissented from the Court's holding, arguing that the procedural default shouldn't be excused.

== Facts ==
In 1997 Cory Maples was convicted of capital murder in Alabama and sentenced to death. The crime in which Maples was sent to death row for was shooting and killing two of his acquaintances in 1995. The victims were Stacy Terry and Barry Robinson. Maples’s appeal brought up that Alabama does not provide death row inmates with lawyers to appeal their convictions and sentences so they must rely on pro bono lawyers to represent them. Two lawyers from the New York law firm of Sullivan & Cromwell agreed to represent Maples free of charge. Those lawyers later quit the law firm and when the Alabama court sent copies of a ruling in Maples' case to the firm's mail room, the law firm returned the copies unopened. The law firm never notified the court or the mail room that new lawyers had taken over the case. Because this information was never received the deadline for appeal was missed.

When Maples learned of the missed deadline, he had his step-mother contact the law firm. The lawyers now handling the case asked for permission to appeal despite missing the original deadline, but that request was denied.

== Background ==
The sixth amendment gives defendants the right to counsel. The Supreme Court ruled in 1976 (citing Brewer v. Williams, 430 U.S. 387 at 398) that a defendant's right to an attorney attaches "at or after the time that judicial proceedings have been initiated against him, whether by formal charge, preliminary hearing, indictment, information, or arraignment."

== Decision ==
On January 18, 2012, the Supreme Court decided in favor of Cory Maples because of the special circumstances of his case. The unannounced and unauthorized abandonment of Maples' case by his lawyers proved significant enough to excuse the defendant from having failed to file an appeal in advance of the deadline.

== Opinion of the Court ==
Justice Ruth Bader Ginsburg delivered the opinion of the Court. The Court reversed the findings of the circuit court and discussed Alabama’s practices in regard to post-conviction representation. The Court held that the procedural default should have been excused, because Maples' non-compliance with State rules were set in motion by external circumstance outside of his knowledge or control for which he could not be held responsible. Attorney negligence does not normally excuse the client from responsibility because the attorney is acting as an agent to the client and the client is therefore responsible and able to manage the actions of his attorney. In Maples' case, however, he was abandoned, without notice, by his attorneys and this effectively severed the relationship.

== Concurring opinion ==
Justice Samuel Alito wrote a concurring opinion.

== Dissenting opinion ==
Justice Antonin Scalia wrote a dissenting opinion. Scalia agreed that abandonment was a legitimate reason to sever the relationship but that Maples had not been abandoned. He was, without interruption, represented by Sullivan & Cromwell and John Butler, an Alabama attorney.

== Current status ==
In August 2024, Maples was re-sentenced to life without parole by a jury. The new sentencing came two years after a federal court overturned his death sentence.
