= Perry v. New Hampshire =

- Supreme Court of the United States

Argued November 2, 2011 Decided January 11, 2012
- Full case name: Barion Perry, Petitioner v. State of New Hampshire, Respondent
- Docket no.: 10-8974
- Citations: 565 U.S. 228 (more) 132 S. Ct. 716; 181 L. Ed. 2d 694; 2012 U.S. LEXIS 579; 80 U.S.L.W. 4073
- Opinion announcement: Opinion announcement

Case history
- Prior: Motion to suppress denied, State v. Perry unreported (N.H. Super., 2010); affirmed, State v. Perry, No. 2009-0590 (N.H. November 18, 2010); cert. granted, 563 U.S. 2011 (2011).

Holding
- The Due Process Clause of the Fourteenth Amendment does not require a preliminary judicial inquiry into the reliability of an eyewitness identification when the identification was not procured under unnecessarily suggestive circumstances arranged by law enforcement.

Court membership
- Chief Justice John Roberts Associate Justices Antonin Scalia · Anthony Kennedy; Clarence Thomas · Ruth Bader Ginsburg; Stephen Breyer · Samuel Alito; Sonia Sotomayor · Elena Kagan

Case opinions
- Majority: Ginsburg, joined by Roberts, Scalia, Kennedy, Thomas, Breyer, Alito, Kagan
- Concurrence: Thomas
- Dissent: Sotomayor

Laws applied
- U.S. Const. amend. XIV

Perry v. New Hampshire, 565 U.S. 228 (2012), is a United States Supreme Court case regarding the constitutionality of eyewitness identifications.

== Background ==
The plaintiff, Barion Perry, was convicted for breaking into a car in 2008. A witness, Nubia Blandon told the police that she observed Perry committing the crime from her apartment window. Although she identified him at the scene of the crime, she was unable to pick him out from a line of photos nor describe him to the police. However, a second witness was able to identify Perry out of a line of photos. Perry filed suit motioning to suppress the photos used by the police because the photo used of him was "unnecessarily suggestive." Perry lost his case, and the New Hampshire Supreme Court upheld his conviction. The case was granted certiorari on May 31, 2011, and set for argument on November 2, 2011.

== Decision of the Supreme Court ==
Amicus curiae briefs were filed by the American Psychological Association, the Innocence Network, and the National Association of Criminal Defense Lawyers.

The U.S. Supreme Court delivered its 8–1 decision on January 11, 2012, deciding that judicial examination of eyewitness testimony was required only in the case of police misconduct.

Held: The Due Process Clause does not require a preliminary judicial inquiry into the reliability of an eyewitness identification when the identification was not procured under unnecessarily suggestive circumstances arranged by law enforcement.

— Syllabus author is anonymous; decision, joined by 6 other justices, was delivered by Ruth Bader Ginsburg with Justice Thomas concurring and Justice Sotomayor dissenting

The preeminent role of the jury in evaluating questionable evidence was cited by the court.

== Opinion of the Supreme Court ==
Justice Thomas filed a concurring opinion. Justice Thomas believes that the Due Process Clause is not a general guarantee against unfairness but rather only a guarantee of process before a person is deprived of life, liberty, or property.

Justice Sotomayor filed a dissenting opinion. She stated that it is not merely the act of suggestion, which creates a problem with due process, but the effect of an act of suggestion on the reliability of a resulting identification. She stated that the court's ruling would draw a distinction between intentionally suggestive conduct and inadvertently suggestive conduct, either of which could lead to the same unfair result.

== See also ==
- List of United States Supreme Court cases by the Roberts Court
