= Credit Repair Organizations Act =

The US Credit Repair Organizations Act ("CROA") is Title IV of the Consumer Credit Protection Act. Despite its name, it is not actually an act; Section 401 states, however, it can be referred to as "Credit Repair Organizations Act". The statute was signed by President Bill Clinton on September 30, 1996. The law was intended to prevent credit repair organizations from engaging in unfair business practices which may result in financial hardship for consumers, particularly those of limited economic means or who are uneducated.

The purposes of the Credit Repair Organizations Act is to ensure that prospective buyers of credit repair services from credit repair organizations are provided with the information necessary to make an informed decision. It intends to protect the public from unfair or deceptive advertising and business practices by credit repair organizations. It enumerates prohibited practices, required disclosures, contract requirements, liability, and penalties for non-compliance and procedure to report non-compliance.

One of the more important areas covered by CROA is how credit repair organizations can get paid. It is the general consensus that a credit repair company can only be paid after services have been rendered. This can be done using a monthly fee model where companies charge clients on a monthly basis after services are rendered or on the more modern pay after deletion model where clients only pay after items are deleted from the credit report. Companies that charge excess "setup" fees or all of their fees upfront violate the provisions of CROA.
