= Messerschmidt v. Millender =

- Supreme Court of the United States

Argued December 5, 2011 Decided February 22, 2012
- Full case name: Messerschmidt v. Millender
- Citations: 565 U.S. 535 (more)

Holding
- State officers are entitled to qualified immunity after seizing unrelated evidence from someone who was not under investigation when the error was not immediately apparent based on the text of the search warrant.

Court membership
- Chief Justice John Roberts Associate Justices Antonin Scalia · Anthony Kennedy; Clarence Thomas · Ruth Bader Ginsburg; Stephen Breyer · Samuel Alito; Sonia Sotomayor · Elena Kagan

Case opinions
- Majority: Roberts, joined by Scalia, Kennedy, Thomas, Breyer, Alito
- Concurrence: Breyer
- Concur/dissent: Kagan
- Dissent: Sotomayor, joined by Ginsburg

Messerschmidt v. Millender, 565 U.S. 535 (2012), was a United States Supreme Court case in which the court held that state officers are entitled to qualified immunity after seizing unrelated evidence from someone who was not under investigation when the error was not immediately apparent based on the text of the search warrant.

Messerschmidt is part of a line of cases that strongly suggest that there is a presumption that doubts in qualified immunity cases are to be resolved the officer's favor. Around the same time, Ashcroft v. al-Kidd held similarly for federal officers.

== Background ==
Shelly Kelly alleged that her boyfriend, Jerry Ray Bowen, had just fired a sawed-off shotgun at her. Kelly later met with Curt Messerschmidt, a police officer, to discuss the incident. She described the attack in detail, mentioned that Bowen had previously assaulted her, that he had ties to the Mona Park Crips gang, and that he might be staying at the home of his former foster mother, Augusta Millender. Curt Messerschmidt drafted a request for a search warrant for all guns and gang-related material. Before submitting the application to a magistrate for approval, Messerschmidt had it reviewed by his supervisor, Sergeant Robert Lawrence, as well as a police lieutenant and a deputy district attorney. Then, Messerschmidt submitted it to a magistrate, who approved it. Messerschmidt and other officers executed the warrant. They seized a gun that Millender legally owned and which had nothing to do with Bowen, a California Social Services letter addressed to Bowen, and a box of .45-caliber ammunition.

Millender brought an action seeking to hold the officers personally liable under Section 1983, alleging that the search violated their Fourth Amendment rights because there was not sufficient probable cause to believe the items sought were evidence of a crime. In particular, Millender argued that there was no basis to search for all guns in the home simply because Bowen, the suspect, owned and had used a sawed-off shotgun, and no reason to search for gang material because the shooting at the ex-girlfriend was a domestic dispute that had no relation to gang activity. The federal District Court granted summary judgment to the Millenders, concluding that the firearm and gang-material aspects of the search warrant were overbroad and that the officers were not entitled to qualified immunity from damages.

The Court of Appeals for the Ninth Circuit decided that the warrant was invalid and that the officers were not entitled to immunity from personal liability, referring to the earlier case Malley v. Briggs. The court held that the warrant's authorization was unconstitutionally overbroad because the warrant application failed to establish probable cause that the broad categories of firearms, firearm-related material, and gang-related material were contraband or evidence of a crime, and that a reasonable officer would have been aware of the warrant's deficiency. this invalidity was so obvious that any reasonable officer would have recognized it, despite the magistrate's approval.

== Opinion of the court ==
The Supreme Court issued an opinion on February 22, 2012.

== See also ==
- Groh v. Ramirez
