= Longshore and Harbor Workers' Compensation Act =

The Longshore and Harbor Workers' Compensation Act, 33 U.S.C. §§ 901–950, commonly referred to as the "Longshore Act" or "LHWCA" is federal workers' compensation law/act enacted in 1927. Initially, it mandated coverage to employees injured on navigable waters of the United States. Today, it mandates that coverage be provided to certain "maritime" workers, including most dock workers and maritime workers not otherwise covered by the Jones Act. In addition, Congress has extended the LHWCA to cover non-appropriated fund employees (i.e. certain MWR and AAFES employees), Outer Continental Shelf workers, and U.S. government contractors working in foreign countries under the Defense Base Act This coverage is mandated for all employees, including owners and officers of companies that work in or around navigable waters of the United States.

== Administration ==
The LHWCA is administered by the Division of Longshore and Harbor Workers' Compensation, a division of the Office of Workers' Compensation Programs of the United States Department of Labor. Actual coverage for the Longshore and Harbor Worker's Compensation Act is most commonly purchased through private insurance companies that are approved to sell and administer such coverage by the United States Department of Labor.

== Benefits ==
Generally speaking, a worker covered by the LHWCA is entitled to temporary compensation benefits of two-thirds of his average weekly wage while undergoing medical treatment, and then either to a scheduled award for injury to body parts enumerated in 33 U.S.C. § 908(c) or two-thirds of the workers' loss of wages, or wage earning capacity. More specifically, the LHWCA entitles a worker to reasonable and necessary medical benefits and indemnity benefits. There are four categories of disability benefits: temporary total, temporary partial, permanent total, and permanent partial. The difference between the types of benefits depends on whether the injured worker has achieved medical permanency, and whether the injured worker can return to his pre-injury employment, or return to some form of suitable alternative employment. In certain situations, permanent partial disability benefits are available for retirees. Once an injured worker has reached a state of permanency, the worker may request vocational rehabilitation services from the United States Department of Labor's Division of Longshore and Harbor Workers' Compensation.

In 1972, the Longshore Act was amended to provide additional protections to employers against claims by shipowners, to diminish remedies owed by shipowners to injured workers, and to extend coverage landward for maritime workers. In 1980, the U.S. Supreme Court held that the Longshore Act did not supplant state workers’ compensation laws, but supplemented them. (Sun Ship v. Pennsylvania, 447 U.S. 715 (1980)). In 1984, Congress amended the Longshore Act, but did not invalidate Sun Ship, so concurrent jurisdiction was preserved.

There are numerous hazards that may result in severe injuries to an employee. A catastrophic injury that has resulted from a forklift accident, unloading and loading cargo, oilfield accident, crane accident, gas explosion, fire, or a fall that occurred due to a negligent third party, may warrant compensation under the LHWCA.

== See also ==
- Defense Base Act - extension to LHWCA covering some U.S. workers overseas, including U.S. civilian contractors in Iraq and Afghanistan
- Seaman status in United States admiralty law
