= Individual mandate =

Requirement that certain legal persons own or buy something

An individual mandate is a requirement by law for certain persons to purchase or otherwise obtain a good or service.

== United States ==
=== Militia act ===
The Militia Acts of 1792, based on the Constitution's militia clause (in addition to its affirmative authorization to raise an army and a navy), would have required every "free able-bodied white male citizen" between the ages of 18 and 45, with a few occupational exceptions, to "provide himself" a weapon and ammunition. (See Conscription.)

The Militia Acts were never federally enforced, so their constitutionality was never litigated.

=== Seaman relief act ===
An Act for the relief of sick and disabled seamen, signed into law by President John Adams in 1798, required employers to withhold 20 cents per month from each seaman's pay and turn it over to a Collector of the Federal Treasury when in port, and authorized the President to use the money to pay for "the temporary relief and maintenance of sick or disabled seamen," and to build hospitals to accommodate sick and disabled seamen.

In 2012, Eliot Spitzer credited what he called "spectacular historical reporting by Professor Einer Elhauge," who was employed by the campaign to re-elect President Obama, for finding 18th century legislation that Spitzer and Elhauge called individual mandates. However, as it was similar to workers' compensation, Social Security Disability Insurance, and Medicare, there exists some debate as to whether it can be properly called an individual mandate, because it did not require anyone to purchase anything themselves.

=== Health insurance ===
==== 2006 Massachusetts health care reform ====
As part of Massachusetts Governor Mitt Romney's health care reform efforts, Chapter 58 of the Acts of 2006 established a system to require individuals, with a few exceptions, to obtain health insurance either through an employer or individual purchase. The penalty for not having insurance is enforced in the calculation of personal income tax. Individuals are exempt from penalty if there is no insurance plan available at a price that satisfies an affordability formula (based on income) defined by the Massachusetts Health Connector Board.

==== Affordable Care Act ====
In the United States, the Affordable Care Act (ACA) signed in 2010 by President Barack Obama imposed a health insurance mandate which took effect in 2014. Under this law, insurance companies are restricted in their ability to alter insurance rates based on the current health of the individual buying the insurance. Without incentives or a mandate, healthier individuals would tend to opt out of the system, since they make fewer claims and their premiums support the claims of the less-healthy, for the time being. Insurance companies would then raise rates to make up the lost revenue. That further increases the pressure on healthier individuals to opt out of buying health insurance, which will further increase rates, until such a market collapses. Mandated insurance is intended to prevent such a downward spiral. The penalty for not having insurance that meets the minimum coverage requirements, either from an employer or by individual purchase is enforced in the calculation of personal income tax.

This was the first time the federal government had enacted a mandatory purchase requirement for all residents. In 2010, a number of states joined litigation in federal court arguing that Congress did not have the power to pass this law and that the Commerce Clause power to "regulate" commerce does not include an affirmative power to compel commerce by penalizing inaction.

In 2011, two of four federal appellate courts upheld the individual mandate; a third declared it unconstitutional, and a fourth said the federal Anti-Injunction Act prevents the issue from being decided until taxpayers began paying penalties in 2015. On June 28, 2012, the Supreme Court of the United States in the case of National Federation of Independent Business v. Sebelius upheld the health insurance mandate as a valid tax under the Taxing and Spending Clause of the Constitution. In separate opinions, a majority agreed it would not be justified under the Commerce Clause, even if combined with the Necessary and Proper Clause.

On August 30, 2013, final regulations were published in the Federal Register (78 FR 53646), with minor corrections published December 26, 2013 (78 FR 78256).

On December 22, 2017, President Donald Trump signed the Tax Cuts and Jobs Act of 2017, which eliminated the federal tax penalty for violating the individual mandate, starting in 2019. (In order to pass the Senate under reconciliation rules with only 50 votes, the requirement itself, at $0, is still in effect).

Individual mandates on the state level Individual mandate enacted Individual mandate considered

In 2018, as a response to the cancellation of the individual mandate penalty on the federal level, a number of states and the District of Columbia considered legislation to create state or local requirements. Massachusetts had never stopped its penalty for not carrying coverage, and maintained it post-ACA, in addition to the federal penalty associated with the ACA. After the 2018 dropping of the federal penalty, the state penalty continues to exist in Massachusetts. New Jersey and the District of Columbia passed legislation to penalize individuals for not having health insurance starting from 2019. California, Rhode Island, and Vermont also passed similar legislation that would apply to years 2020 and onward. Other states that considered similar measures include Connecticut, Hawaii, Maryland, Minnesota, and Washington.

== Australia ==
In Australia, all states and territories now have legislation that requires home and building owners to install smoke alarms. Thus, if they have not been installed, for example, in older homes and buildings, owners must procure or purchase, and install, smoke alarms.

== See also ==
- Health insurance mandate
- Mandate (criminal law)
- The free-rider problem
- Forced rider
- Moral hazard
