= 2011 term opinions of the Supreme Court of the United States =

October 2011 to October 2012 opinions

The 2011 term of the Supreme Court of the United States began October 3, 2011, and concluded September 30, 2012. The table illustrates which opinion was filed by each justice in each case and which justices joined each opinion.

== Table key ==
Delivered the court's opinion

Joined the court's opinion

Filed a concurrence

Joined a concurrence

Filed a dissent

Joined a dissent

Filed a concurrence/dissent

Joined a concurrence/dissent

Did not participate in the decision
- Decisions that do not note an argument date were decided without oral argument. Decisions that do not note a justice delivering the court's opinion are per curiam.
- Multiple concurrences and dissents within a case are numbered, with joining votes numbered accordingly. Justices frequently join multiple opinions in a single case; each vote is subdivided accordingly.
- An asterisk ( * ) in the court's opinion denotes that it was only a majority in part or a plurality. An asterisk in a joining vote denotes that the justice joined it only in part.
- A dash ( - ) denotes that the justice voted without filing or joining an opinion.

== 2011 term opinions ==
#	Case name and citation	Argued	Decided	Roberts	Scalia	Kennedy	Thomas	Ginsburg	Breyer	Alito	Sotomayor	Kagan
1	Cavazos v. Smith, 565 U.S. 1		October 31, 2011									
2	KPMG LLP v. Cocchi, 565 U.S. 18		November 7, 2011									
3	Bobby v. Dixon, 565 U.S. 23		November 7, 2011									
4	Greene v. Fisher, 565 U.S. 34	October 11, 2011	November 8, 2011									
5	Judulang v. Holder, 565 U.S. 42	October 12, 2011	December 12, 2011									
6	Hardy v. Cross, 565 U.S. 65		December 12, 2011									
7	Smith v. Cain, 565 U.S. 73	November 8, 2011	January 10, 2012									
8	CompuCredit Corp. v. Greenwood, 565 U.S. 95	October 11, 2011	January 10, 2012									
9	Minneci v. Pollard, 565 U.S. 118	November 1, 2011	January 10, 2012									
10	Gonzalez v. Thaler, 565 U.S. 134	November 2, 2011	January 10, 2012									
11	Hosanna-Tabor Evang. Lutheran Church and School v. EEOC, 565 U.S. 171	October 5, 2011	January 11, 2012				1			2		2
12	Pacific Operators Offshore, LLP v. Valladolid, 565 U.S. 207	October 11, 2011	January 11, 2012									
13	Perry v. New Hampshire, 565 U.S. 228	November 2, 2011	January 11, 2012									
14	Maples v. Thomas, 565 U.S. 266	October 4, 2011	January 18, 2012									
15	Golan v. Holder, 565 U.S. 302	October 5, 2011	January 18, 2012									
16	Mims v. Arrow Financial Services, LLC, 565 U.S. 368	November 28, 2011	January 18, 2012									
17	Perry v. Perez, 565 U.S. 388		January 20, 2012									
18	United States v. Jones, 565 U.S. 400	November 8, 2011	January 23, 2012					1	1	1	2	1
19	Reynolds v. United States, 565 U.S. 432	October 3, 2011	January 23, 2012									
20	National Meat Assn. v. Harris, 565 U.S. 452	November 9, 2011	January 23, 2012									
21	Ryburn v. Huff, 565 U.S. 469		January 23, 2012									
22	Kawashima v. Holder, 565 U.S. 478	November 7, 2011	February 21, 2012									
23	Howes v. Fields, 565 U.S. 499	October 4, 2011	February 21, 2012									
24	Wetzel v. Lambert, 565 U.S. 520		February 24, 2012									
25	Marmet Health Care Center, Inc. v. Brown, 565 U.S. 530		February 21, 2012									
26	Messerschmidt v. Millender, 565 U.S. 535	December 5, 2011	February 22, 2012									
27	PPL Montana, LLC v. Montana, 565 U.S. 576	December 7, 2011	February 22, 2012									
28	Douglas v. Independent Living Center of Southern Cal., Inc., 565 U.S. 606	October 3, 2011	February 22, 2012									
29	Kurns v. Railroad Friction Products Corp., 565 U.S. 625	November 9, 2011	February 29, 2012									
30	Martel v. Claire, 565 U.S. 648	December 6, 2011	March 5, 2012									
31	Martinez v. Ryan, 566 U.S. 1	October 4, 2011	March 20, 2012									
32	Coleman v. Court of Appeals of Md., 566 U.S. 30	January 11, 2012	March 20, 2012		1	*	2				*	*
33	Mayo Collaborative Servs. v. Prometheus Lab., Inc., 566 U.S. 66	December 7, 2011	March 20, 2012									
34	Roberts v. Sea-Land Services, Inc., 566 U.S. 93	January 11, 2012	March 20, 2012									
35	Sackett v. EPA, 566 U.S. 120	January 9, 2012	March 21, 2012					1		2		
36	Missouri v. Frye, 566 U.S. 134	October 31, 2011	March 21, 2012									
37	Lafler v. Cooper, 566 U.S. 156	October 31, 2011	March 21, 2012	1*	1		1			2		
38	Zivotofsky v. Clinton, 566 U.S. 189	November 7, 2011	March 26, 2012						2*	1	2	
39	Credit Suisse Securities (USA) LLC v. Simmonds, 566 U.S. 221	November 29, 2011	March 26, 2012									
40	Setser v. United States, 566 U.S. 231	November 30, 2011	March 28, 2012									
41	Vartelas v. Holder, 566 U.S. 257	January 18, 2012	March 28, 2012									
42	FAA v. Cooper, 566 U.S. 284	November 30, 2011	March 28, 2012									
43	Florence v. Board of Chosen Freeholders of County of Burlington, 566 U.S. 318	October 12, 2011	April 2, 2012	1		*	*			2		
44	Rehberg v. Paulk, 566 U.S. 356	November 1, 2011	April 2, 2012									
45	Vasquez v. United States, 566 U.S. 378	March 21, 2012	April 2, 2012									
46	Filarsky v. Delia, 566 U.S. 377	January 17, 2012	April 17, 2012					1			2	
47	Caraco Pharmaceutical Laboratories, Ltd. v. Novo Nordisk A/S, 566 U.S. 399	December 5, 2011	April 17, 2012									
48	Kappos v. Hyatt, 566 U.S. 431	January 9, 2012	April 18, 2012									
49	Mohamad v. Palestinian Authority, 566 U.S. 449	February 28, 2012	April 18, 2012		*							
50	Wood v. Milyard, 566 U.S. 463	February 27, 2012	April 24, 2012									
51	United States v. Home Concrete & Supply, LLC, 566 U.S. 478	January 17, 2012	April 25, 2012		*				*			
52	Hall v. United States, 566 U.S. 506	November 29, 2011	May 14, 2012									
53	Astrue v. Capato, 566 U.S. 541	March 19, 2012	May 21, 2012									
54	Taniguchi v. Kan Pacific Saipan, Ltd., 566 U.S. 560	February 21, 2012	May 21, 2012									
55	Holder v. Martinez Gutierrez, 566 U.S. 583	January 18, 2012	May 21, 2012									
56	Blueford v. Arkansas, 566 U.S. 599	February 22, 2012	May 24, 2012									
57	Freeman v. Quicken Loans, Inc., 566 U.S. 624	February 21, 2012	May 24, 2012									
58	RadLAX Gateway Hotel, LLC v. Amalgamated Bank, 566 U.S. 639	April 23, 2012	May 29, 2012									
59	Coleman v. Johnson, 566 U.S. 650		May 29, 2012									
60	Reichle v. Howards, 566 U.S. 658	March 21, 2012	June 4, 2012									
61	Armour v. Indianapolis, 566 U.S. 673	February 29, 2012	June 4, 2012									
62	Elgin v. Department of Treasury, 567 U.S. 1	February 27, 2012	June 11, 2012									
63	Parker v. Matthews, 567 U.S. 37		June 11, 2012									
64	Williams v. Illinois, 567 U.S. 50	December 6, 2011	June 18, 2012				1		2	*		
65	Christopher v. SmithKline Beecham Corp., 567 U.S. 142	April 16, 2012	June 18, 2012									
66	Salazar v. Ramah Navajo Chapter, 567 U.S. 182	April 18, 2012	June 18, 2012									
67	Match-E-Be-Nash-She-Wish Band... v. Patchak, 567 U.S. 209	April 24, 2012	June 18, 2012									
68	FCC v. Fox Television Stations, Inc., 567 U.S. 239	January 10, 2012	June 21, 2012									
69	Dorsey v. United States, 567 U.S. 260	April 17, 2012	June 21, 2012									
70	Knox v. Service Employees, 567 U.S. 298	January 10, 2012	June 21, 2012									
71	Southern Union Co. v. United States, 567 U.S. 343	March 19, 2012	June 21, 2012									
72	Arizona v. United States, 567 U.S. 387	April 25, 2012	June 25, 2012		1		2			3		
73	Miller v. Alabama, 567 U.S. 460	March 20, 2012	June 25, 2012	1	1 / 2 / 3		1 / 2			1 / 3		
74	American Tradition Partnership, Inc. v. Bullock, 567 U.S. 516		June 25, 2012									
75	National Federation of Independent Business v. Sebelius, 567 U.S. 519	March 26–28, 2012	June 28, 2012	*	1	1	1 / 2	*	* / *	1	*	* / *
76	United States v. Alvarez, 567 U.S. 709	February 22, 2012	June 28, 2012			*						
77	First American Financial Corp. v. Edwards, 567 U.S. 756	November 28, 2011	June 28, 2012									
78	Tennant v. Jefferson County, 567 U.S. 758		September 25, 2012									
#	Case name and citation	Argued	Decided	Roberts	Scalia	Kennedy	Thomas	Ginsburg	Breyer	Alito	Sotomayor	Kagan

== 2011 term membership and statistics ==
This was the seventh term of Chief Justice Roberts' tenure and the second term with the same membership.

Justice		Appointment history		Agreement with judgment		Opinions filed				
Seniority	Name	President	Date confirmed	%	#					Total
Chief Justice	John Roberts	George W. Bush	September 29, 2005	90.9%	70/77	7	1	0	4	12
Associate Justice	Antonin Scalia	Ronald Reagan	September 26, 1986	80.8%	63/78	8	4	1	9	22
Associate Justice	Anthony Kennedy	Ronald Reagan	February 18, 1988	93.5%	72/77	9	0	0	2	11
Associate Justice	Clarence Thomas	George H. W. Bush	October 23, 1991	84.6%	66/78	6	6	1	3	16
Associate Justice	Ruth Bader Ginsburg	Bill Clinton	August 10, 1993	67.9%	53/78	7	4	3	6	20
Associate Justice	Stephen Breyer	Bill Clinton	August 3, 1994	76.9%	60/78	7	5	0	10	22
Associate Justice	Samuel Alito	George W. Bush	January 31, 2006	82.1%	64/78	7	6	1	5	19
Associate Justice	Sonia Sotomayor	Barack Obama	August 6, 2009	79.2%	61/77	6	7	1	5	19
Associate Justice	Elena Kagan	Barack Obama	August 7, 2010	81.1%	60/74	7	1	1	1	10
Notes on statistics: Opinion counts only include the bench opinions listed above; opinions relating to orders or in-chambers opinions are not included.; Agreement with the Court's judgment does not guarantee agreement with the reasoning expressed in its opinion. A justice is not considered in agreement if they dissented even in part. Agreement percentages are based only on the listed cases in which a justice participated and are rounded to the nearest one-tenth of one percentage point.; Individual opinion counts will not match the Court's totals; the dissent in National Federation of Independent Business v. Sebelius that was jointly authored by Scalia, Kennedy, Thomas, and Alito is counted separately for all four justices but counted only once in the Court's totals.						Totals				
						64	34	8	42	148
