= Lafler v. Cooper =

- Supreme Court of the United States

Argued October 31, 2011 Decided March 21, 2012
- Full case name: Blaine Lafler, Petitioner v. Anthony Cooper, Respondent
- Docket no.: 10-209
- Citations: 566 U.S. 156 (more) 132 S. Ct. 1376; 182 L. Ed. 2d 398
- Argument: Oral argument
- Opinion announcement: Opinion announcement

Case history
- Prior: Habeas corpus granted, Cooper v. Lafler, No. 06–11068, 2009 WL 817712 (E.D. Mich., March 26, 2009); aff'd, 376 F. App'x 563 (6th Cir. 2010); cert. granted sub nom. Lafler v. Cooper, 562 U.S. 1127 (2011).

Holding
- In cases of ineffective assistance of counsel leading to the rejection of a plea agreement, in order to show prejudice under Strickland v. Washington, a defendant must show that but for the ineffective advice, there is a reasonable probability that the plea offer would have been presented to the court, that the court would have accepted its terms, and that the conviction or sentence, or both, under the offer’s terms would have been less severe than under the actual judgment and sentence imposed. Relief in such cases should be tailored to the specific circumstances of each case.

Court membership
- Chief Justice John Roberts Associate Justices Antonin Scalia · Anthony Kennedy; Clarence Thomas · Ruth Bader Ginsburg; Stephen Breyer · Samuel Alito; Sonia Sotomayor · Elena Kagan

Case opinions
- Majority: Kennedy, joined by Ginsburg, Breyer, Sotomayor, Kagan
- Dissent: Scalia, joined by Thomas; Roberts (all but Part IV)
- Dissent: Alito

Lafler v. Cooper, 566 U.S. 156 (2012), was a United States Supreme Court case in which the Court clarified the Sixth Amendment standard for reversing convictions due to ineffective assistance of counsel during plea bargaining. The Court ruled that when a lawyer's ineffective assistance leads to the rejection of a plea agreement, a defendant is entitled to relief if the outcome of the plea process would have been different with competent advice. In such cases, the Court ruled that the Sixth Amendment requires the trial judge to exercise discretion to determine an appropriate remedy.

Anthony Cooper was charged by the State of Michigan with assault with intent to murder and three other offenses. After being incorrectly advised by his lawyer that the prosecution would be unable to prove intent to murder, he rejected a plea bargain. After being convicted at a fair trial, he appealed his conviction, arguing that his lawyer had provided ineffective assistance of counsel by advising him to reject the plea deal. Michigan courts denied him relief, but federal courts granted a writ of habeas corpus requiring the State to reduce Cooper's sentence to the one he would have received under the plea agreement. The State appealed to the Supreme Court, which agreed to hear the case.

Writing for the 5–4 majority, Justice Kennedy ruled that ineffective assistance of counsel during plea negotiations can constitute grounds for relief if there is a fair probability that defense counsel's ineffective assistance resulted in a harsher sentence or conviction. In those cases, Justice Kennedy wrote, trial judges should exercise discretion in choosing to vacate a conviction and accept the original plea bargain, resentence the defendant, or leave the original conviction undisturbed. Justice Scalia wrote a dissenting opinion joined by Justice Thomas and Chief Justice Roberts (in large part) which argued that the majority had invented a constitutional right to plea bargain. Justice Alito also wrote a dissenting opinion in which he largely agreed with Justice Scalia and specifically argued that the majority's remedy was unsound.

Reactions following the Supreme Court's ruling were mixed, with some commentators praising the Court's recognition of the role of plea bargaining in criminal justice and others criticizing the implications of not sufficiently protecting defendants' rights and of requiring defense counsel to plea bargain at the desire of the prosecutor.

== Background ==
=== Ineffective assistance of counsel ===
The Assistance of Counsel Clause of the Sixth Amendment to the United States Constitution provides that:

In all criminal prosecutions, the accused shall enjoy the right ... to have the Assistance of Counsel for his defence."

The Supreme Court has interpreted the clause to require states to provide indigent criminal defendants with counsel. In Strickland v. Washington, the controlling Supreme Court decision on ineffective assistance of counsel, the Court ruled that simply having "a person who happens to be a lawyer [...] present at trial alongside the accused [...] is not enough to satisfy the constitutional command". The Strickland Court determined that a conviction may be reversed for ineffective assistance of counsel if the defendant shows that:

- Counsel's performance was "deficient," such that counsel's errors were "so serious that counsel was not functioning as the 'counsel' guaranteed the defendant by the Sixth Amendment" (the performance prong); and
- Counsel's performance gives rise to a reasonable probability that if counsel had performed adequately, the result would have been different (the prejudice prong).

=== Michigan trial court ===
On March 25, 2003, Anthony Cooper shot Kali Mundy repeatedly under the waist, injuring (but not killing) her. Cooper was charged with assault with intent to murder, possession of a firearm by a felon, possession of a firearm in the commission of a felony, misdemeanor possession of marijuana, and for being a habitual offender. Before trial, the prosecution offered Cooper a plea bargain to dismiss two charges and recommend a sentence of 51 to 85 months on the other two in exchange for a guilty plea. Cooper expressed willingness to accept the deal and plead guilty, but later rejected the offer and went to trial. At trial, Cooper was convicted on all counts and received a sentence of 185 to 360 months' imprisonment.

Cooper later gave evidence his attorney had inaccurately advised him that he could not be convicted of assault with intent to murder because he shot the victim below the waist. The state trial court heard and rejected Cooper's motion for resentencing, not finding that his attorney's defective advice, to reject the plea agreement, constituted ineffective assistance of counsel.

=== State court appeals ===
Cooper appealed to the Michigan Court of Appeals, renewing his claim that his attorney's incorrect advice during plea bargaining constituted ineffective assistance of counsel. In a per curiam opinion issued on March 15, 2005, the Court of Appeals affirmed the rejection of the claim on the grounds that Cooper had "knowingly and intelligently rejected two plea offers and chose to go to trial". Cooper applied to the Michigan Supreme Court for leave to file an appeal, which it denied on October 31, 2005, "because we are not persuaded that the questions presented should be reviewed by this Court".

=== Federal habeas proceedings ===
Cooper filed a petition for a writ of habeas corpus in the United States District Court for the Eastern District of Michigan, again renewing his claim that his attorney's advice to reject the plea agreement constituted ineffective assistance of counsel. On March 26, 2009, U.S. District Judge Denise Page Hood granted the petition, issuing a writ of habeas corpus "ordering specific performance of Petitioner’s original plea agreement, for a minimum sentence in the range of fifty-one to eighty-five months, the plea Petitioner would have accepted if counsel had been competent".

The State of Michigan appealed to the United States Court of Appeals for the Sixth Circuit, arguing that Cooper's lawyer had not provided deficient advice, that there was no prejudice because Cooper received a fair trial, and that the District Court's "specific performance" remedy was unlawful. The Sixth Circuit affirmed the District Court's order, holding that Cooper had established a Strickland violation and that the remedy of specific performance was proper.

== Supreme Court ==
The State appealed to the Supreme Court, filing a petition for certiorari. On January 7, 2011, the Supreme Court agreed to hear the case, granting certiorari and directing the parties to brief and argue the following question, in addition to the question presented in the petition for certiorari: "What remedy, if any, should be provided for ineffective assistance of counsel during plea bargain negotiations if the defendant was later convicted and sentenced pursuant to constitutionally adequate procedures?"

=== Arguments ===
For the Supreme Court's review, both parties agreed that the first Strickland prong had been satisfied – that is, the parties agreed that Cooper's trial counsel had performed deficiently. The central disagreement was on whether Cooper had satisfied the Strickland prejudice prong. The State argued that Cooper did not suffer any prejudice from his counsel's deficient performance because the Constitution does not guarantee defendants a right to a plea agreement, and that far from being prejudiced, Cooper had exercised his Constitutional right to stand trial by rejecting the plea deal. Because Cooper had received a fair trial after pleading not guilty, the State argued, Cooper's rights had not been violated.

Cooper argued that even though there is no right to a plea agreement itself, criminal defendants have the right to be assisted by competent counsel during plea negotiations. Accordingly, Cooper argued that criminal defendants can be prejudiced by ineffective assistance of counsel during plea negotiations, even if the subsequent trial was fair. Cooper also pointed out that every federal court of appeals to have considered the issue, and 25 of the 27 states to have considered the issue, agreed that counsel's deficient performance during plea negotiations can constitute Strickland prejudice.

In response to the Supreme Court's order directing the parties to argue what remedy would be appropriate, the State argued that no remedy was appropriate. The State wrote that courts should not order prosecutions to offer a particular plea agreement, because doing so would constitute a breach of separation of powers and the discretion inherent in the plea process. The State also argued that allowing criminal defendants any remedy would "open the floodgates to litigation by defendants seeking to unsettle their convictions". Cooper argued that allowing the defendant to accept the plea agreement was the appropriate remedy, putting the defendant in the same position as if counsel had not performed deficiently.

=== Opinion of the Court ===
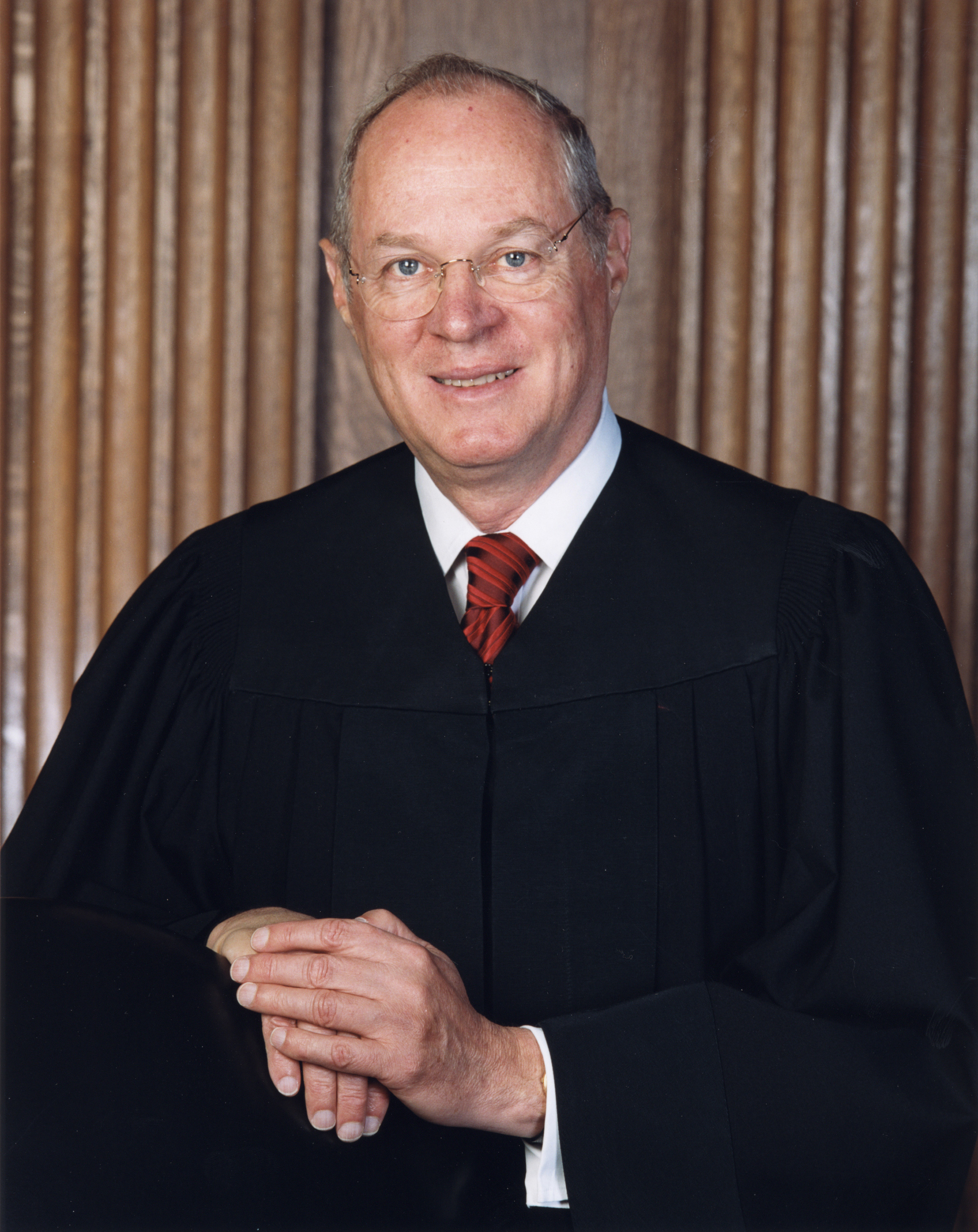
Justice Kennedy delivered the opinion of the 5–4 majority.

Justice Kennedy delivered the opinion of the Court on March 21, 2012. In a 5–4 decision, the Supreme Court vacated the Sixth Circuit's opinion and remanded for further consideration. Relying on his opinion in Missouri v. Frye, which was also decided the same day, Justice Kennedy wrote that the Sixth Amendment right to effective assistance of counsel extends to plea negotiations. The Court ruled that to establish prejudice and obtain relief, a defendant

must show that but for the ineffective advice of counsel there is a reasonable probability that the plea offer would have been presented to the court (i.e., that the defendant would have accepted the plea and the prosecution would not have withdrawn it in light of intervening circumstances), that the court would have accepted its terms, and that the conviction or sentence, or both, under the offer's terms would have been less severe than under the judgment and sentence that in fact were imposed.

As to the remedy for ineffective assistance of counsel during plea negotiations, the Court wrote that any remedy should be "tailored to the injury suffered from the constitutional violation and should not unnecessarily infringe on competing interests". The Court noted that the injury from deficient counsel during plea bargaining "can come in at least one of two forms": losing a "lesser sentence" and losing the opportunity to plead guilty to "counts less serious than the ones for which a defendant was convicted after trial". In cases where the "sole advantage a defendant would have received under the plea is a lesser sentence", the Supreme Court ruled that courts should "exercise discretion in determining whether the defendant should receive the term of imprisonment the government offered in the plea, the sentence he received at trial, or something in between". When "resentencing alone will not be full redress for the constitutional injury, [...] the proper exercise of discretion to remedy the constitutional injury may be to require the prosecution to reoffer the plea proposal".

Applying those standards to Cooper's case, the Supreme Court ruled that Cooper had established that he had been prejudiced by his counsel's deficient performance. Turning to the remedy, the Court ruled that the District Court should require the prosecution to re-offer the plea deal and then decide whether to resentence Cooper.

=== Dissents ===
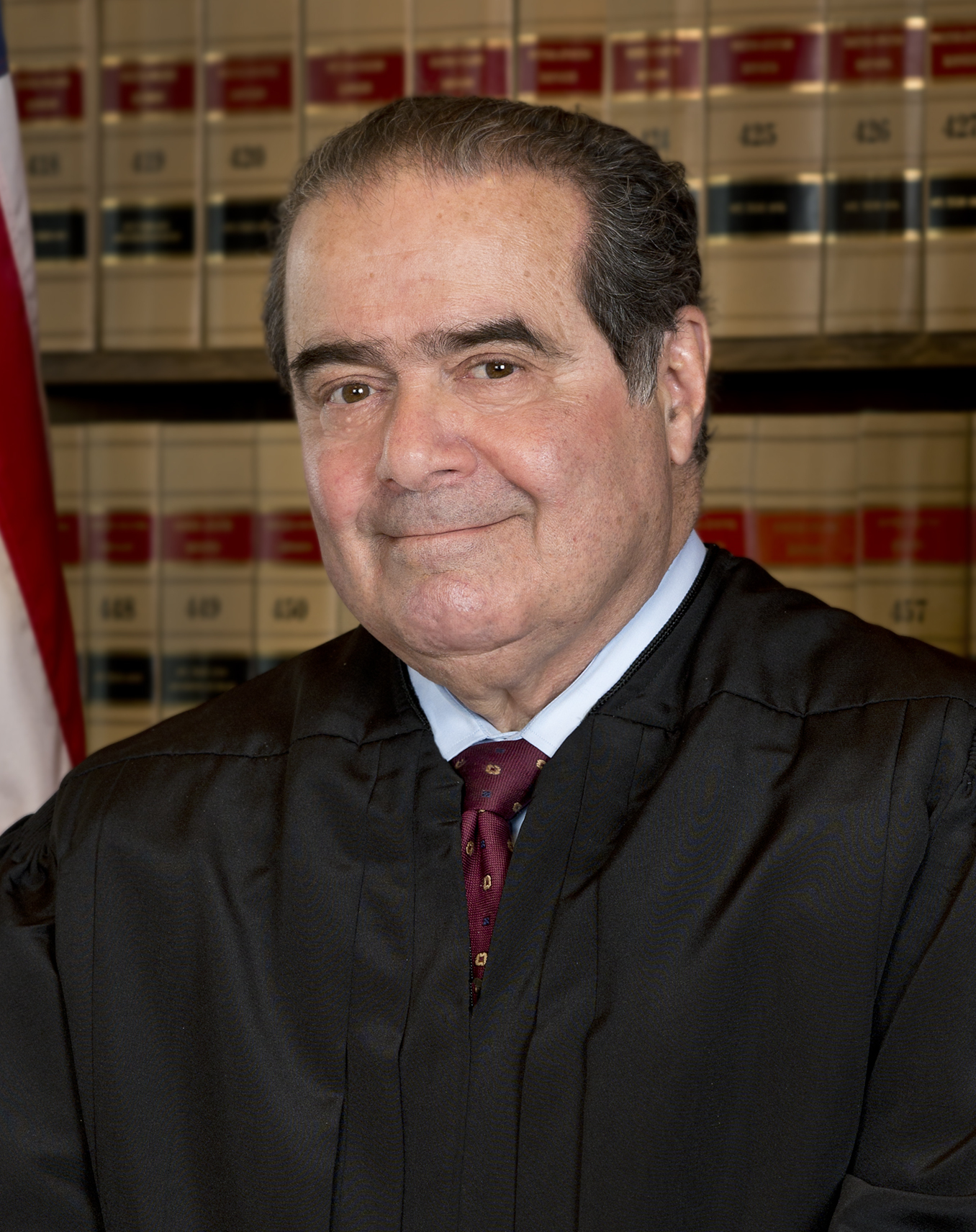
Justice Scalia wrote a dissent joined by Justice Thomas and Chief Justice Roberts (in large part).

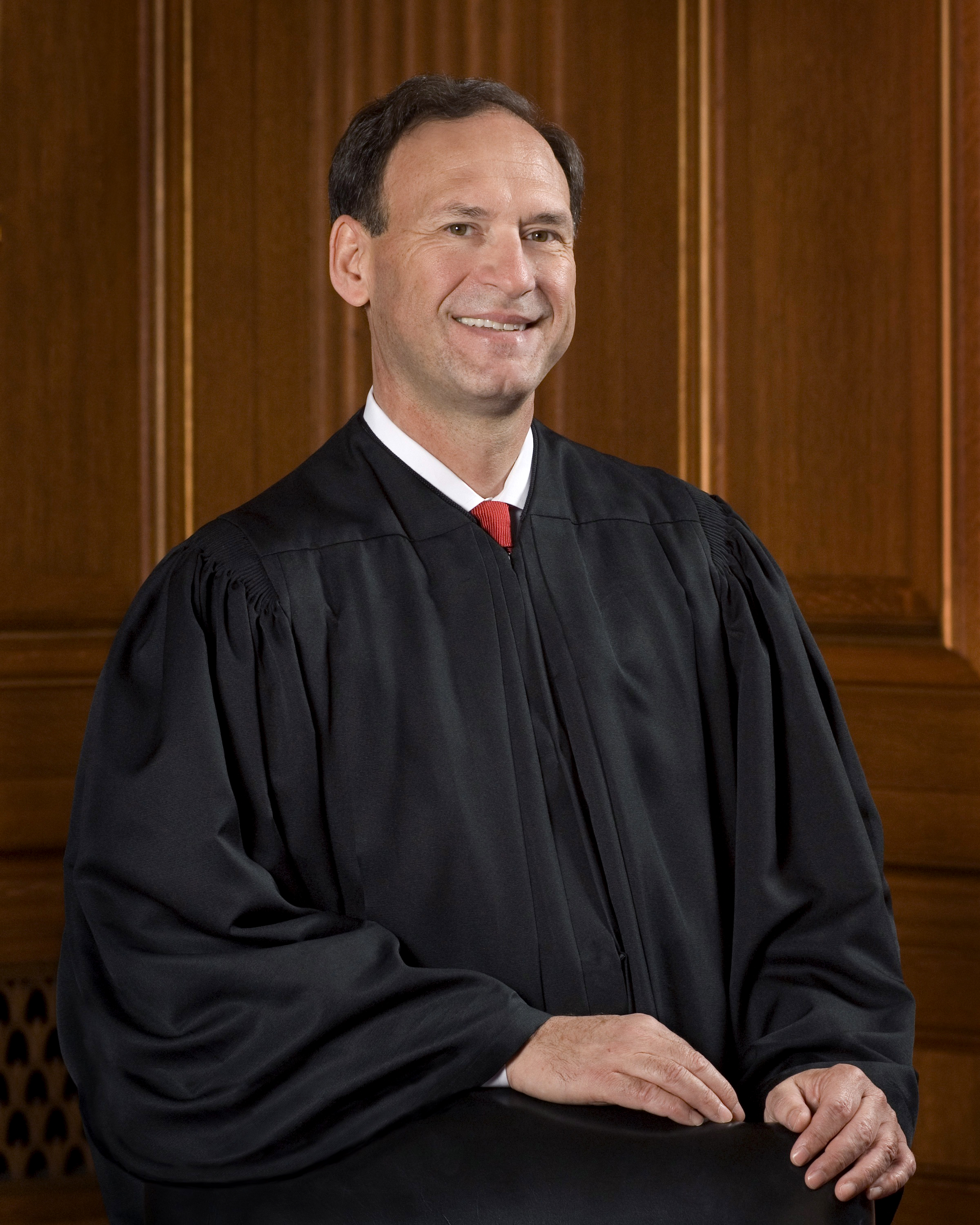
Justice Alito also authored a dissent.

Justice Scalia wrote a dissenting opinion joined by Justice Thomas and Chief Justice Roberts (as to all but Part IV). In a rare move, Scalia read his dissent from the bench, calling the Court's holding "absurd" and "unheard-of". Scalia argued that by reversing a conviction following "a full-dress criminal trial with its innumerable constitutional and statutory limitations upon the evidence that the prosecution can bring forward, and (in Michigan as in most States) the requirement of a unanimous guilty verdict by impartial jurors", the majority transformed plea bargaining from being an embarrassing "necessary evil" to being an embraced, constitutionally-protected institution of the criminal justice system.

Justice Scalia remarked that the Sixth Amendment was designed to protect fair trials, and that errors which do not impact the fairness of a trial cannot constitute Strickland prejudice. He noted that the majority's remedy, which left to the discretion of the trial judge the specific relief, was unprecedented in the history of the Court's criminal justice jurisprudence. Finally, he argued that granting relief would violate the Antiterrorism and Effective Death Penalty Act of 1996, which prohibits federal courts from granting relief unless the state court issued a decision "contrary to, or [which] involved an unreasonable application of, clearly established Federal law, as determined by the Supreme Court of the United States".

Justice Alito also wrote a dissenting opinion, which largely agreed with Justice Scalia's analysis. Justice Alito then wrote the "weakness in the Court’s analysis is highlighted by its opaque discussion of the remedy that is appropriate when a plea offer is rejected due to defective legal representation".

== Reception ==
Reactions to the Supreme Court's decision were mixed. Lawyers on all sides of the issue were surprised by the broadness of the Court's ruling. An article published in the Federal Sentencing Reporter argued that the government had "[won] by losing" by requiring defense lawyers to "bargain at the behest of the prosecutor". The Brennan Center for Justice wrote that the decision could incentivize defense counsel to advise accepting the first plea bargain their clients are offered for fear of being labelled "ineffective" by a court deciding that rejecting the plea was disadvantageous with the advantage of hindsight, but also noted that the decision represented a "triumph of realism and justice over narrow legalism and formalism". Articles published by the Notre Dame Law Review and the University of Chicago Public Law & Legal Theory Research Paper Series argued that the Court had not done enough to protect defendants' rights, while an article published in the Mississippi Law Journal criticized the Court for "possibly neglecting the fundamental goal of the Sixth Amendment: the right to a fair trial". The ruling was described as creating "a new body of constitutional law" and was seen as broadly impactful on all sides.
