= Armour v. City of Indianapolis =

- Supreme Court of the United States

Decided June 4, 2012
- Full case name: Armour v. City of Indianapolis
- Citations: 566 U.S. 673 (more)

Holding
- Declining to refund people who had paid a lump sum instead of installments into a city program was rationally related to lowering administrative costs, so it did not violate the Equal Protection Clause.

Court membership
- Chief Justice John Roberts Associate Justices Antonin Scalia · Anthony Kennedy; Clarence Thomas · Ruth Bader Ginsburg; Stephen Breyer · Samuel Alito; Sonia Sotomayor · Elena Kagan

Case opinions
- Majority: Breyer, joined by Kennedy, Thomas, Ginsburg, Sotomayor, Kagan
- Dissent: Roberts, joined by Scalia, Alito

Laws applied
- Equal Protection Clause

Armour v. City of Indianapolis, 566 U.S. 673 (2012), was a United States Supreme Court case in which the court held that declining to refund people who had paid a lump sum instead of installments into a city program was rationally related to lowering administrative costs, so it did not violate the Equal Protection Clause.

== Background ==
For decades, Indianapolis, Indiana funded sewer projects using Indiana's Barrett Law, which permitted cities to apportion a public-improvement project's costs equally among all abutting lots. Under that system, a city would create an initial assessment, dividing the total estimated cost by the number of lots and making any necessary adjustments. Upon a project's completion, the city would issue a final lot-by-lot assessment. Lot owners could elect to pay the assessment in a lump sum or over time in installments.

After the City completed the Brisbane/Manning Sanitary Sewers Project, it sent affected homeowners formal notice of their payment obligations. Of the 180 affected homeowners, 38 elected to pay the lump sum. The following year, the City abandoned Barrett Law financing and adopted the Septic Tank Elimination Program (STEP), which financed projects partially through bonds, thereby lowering individual owner's sewer-connection costs. In implementing STEP, the City's Board of Public Works enacted a resolution forgiving all assessment amounts still owed pursuant to Barrett Law financing. Homeowners who had paid the Brisbane/Manning Project lump sum received no refund, while homeowners who had elected to pay in installments were under no obligation to make further payments.

The 38 homeowners who paid the lump sum asked the City for a refund, but the City denied the request. Thirty-one of these homeowners brought suit in Indiana state court claiming that the City's refusal violated the Federal Equal Protection Clause. The trial court granted summary judgment to the homeowners, and the Indiana Court of Appeals affirmed. The Indiana Supreme Court reversed, holding that the City's distinction between those who had already paid and those who had not was rationally related to its legitimate interests in reducing administrative costs, providing financial hardship relief to homeowners, transitioning from the Barrett Law system to STEP, and preserving its limited resources.

== Opinion of the court ==
The Supreme Court issued an opinion on June 4, 2012.
