= National Meat Association v. Harris =

- Supreme Court of the United States

Decided January 23, 2012
- Full case name: National Meat Association v. Harris
- Citations: 565 U.S. 452 (more)

Holding
- The Federal Meat Inspection Act preempts a California statute relating to non-ambulatory animals.

Court membership
- Chief Justice John Roberts Associate Justices Antonin Scalia · Anthony Kennedy; Clarence Thomas · Ruth Bader Ginsburg; Stephen Breyer · Samuel Alito; Sonia Sotomayor · Elena Kagan

Case opinion
- Majority: Kagan, joined by unanimous

Laws applied
- Federal Meat Inspection Act

National Meat Association v. Harris, 565 U.S. 452 (2012), was a United States Supreme Court case in which the court held that the Federal Meat Inspection Act preempts a California statute relating to non-ambulatory animals.

== Background ==
The Federal Meat Inspection Act (FMIA) regulates a broad range of activities at slaughterhouses to ensure the safety of meat and the humane handling of animals. The United States Department of Agriculture's Food Safety and Inspection Service (FSIS), which administers the FMIA, has issued extensive regulations to govern the inspection of animals and meat, as well as other aspects of slaughterhouses' operations and facilities. The FSIS inspection procedure begins with an "ante-mortem" inspection of each animal brought to a slaughterhouse. If, at that inspection, a non-ambulatory animal is found to suffer from a particularly severe disease or condition, it must be classified as "U. S. Condemned" and killed apart from the slaughtering facilities where food is produced. Non-ambulatory animals that are not condemned are classified as "U. S. Suspect." They are set apart, specially monitored, and "slaughtered separately from other livestock." Following slaughter, an inspector decides at a "post-mortem" examination which parts, if any, of the suspect animal's carcass may be processed into food for humans. FSIS regulations additionally prescribe methods for handling animals humanely at all stages of the slaughtering process, including specific provisions for the humane treatment of nonambulatory animals. The FMIA's preemption clause, §678, precludes states from imposing requirements that are "within the scope" of the FMIA, relate to slaughterhouse "premises, facilities and operations," and are "in addition to, or different than those made under" the FMIA.

In 2008, California amended its penal code to provide in §599f that no slaughterhouse shall "buy, sell, or receive a nonambulatory animal"; "process, butcher, or sell meat or products of nonambulatory animals for human consumption"; or "hold a nonambulatory animal without taking immediate action to humanely euthanize the animal." National Meat Association (NMA), a trade association representing meatpackers and processors, sued to enjoin enforcement of §599f against swine slaughterhouses, arguing that the FMIA preempts application of the state law. The federal District Court agreed, and granted the NMA a preliminary injunction. The Ninth Circuit Court of Appeals reversed, holding that §599f is not preempted because it regulates only "the kind of animal that may be slaughtered," not the inspection or slaughtering process itself.

== Opinion of the court ==
The Supreme Court issued an opinion on January 23, 2012.
