= List of United States Supreme Court cases, volume 566 =

This is a list of all the United States Supreme Court cases from volume 566 of the United States Reports:

| Case name | Citation | Date decided |
|---|---|---|
| Martinez v. Ryan | 566 U.S. 1 | March 20, 2012 |
A federal court can still hear an incarcerated person's untimely appeal where state law requires them to raise claims of ineffective lawyers after their trial and does not provide them with proper legal help.
| Coleman v. Ct. App. | 566 U.S. 30 | March 20, 2012 |
Suits under the FMLA's self-care provision are barred by sovereign immunity.
| Mayo Collab. Serv. v. Prometheus Laboratories, Inc. | 566 U.S. 66 | March 20, 2012 |
A diagnostic method that is based on a newly discovered natural correlation and utilizes well-known routine methods of analysis is not patent eligible subject matter because the method does not add an inventive concept to the application of the natural laws.
| Roberts v. Sea-Land Services, Inc. | 566 U.S. 93 | March 20, 2012 |
An employee is "newly awarded compensation" when they first become disabled and thereby become statutorily entitled to benefits, no matter whether, or when, a compensation order issues on their behalf.
| Sackett v. EPA | 566 U.S. 120 | March 21, 2012 |
Orders under the Clean Water Act are subject to the Administrative Procedure Act, which requires an appeals process for any ruling by a federal agency.
| Missouri v. Frye | 566 U.S. 134 | March 21, 2012 |
Defense counsel has the duty to communicate formal offers from the prosecution to accept a plea on terms and conditions that may be favorable to the accused.
| Lafler v. Cooper | 566 U.S. 156 | March 21, 2012 |
In cases of ineffective assistance of counsel leading to the rejection of a plea agreement, in order to show prejudice under Strickland v. Washington, a defendant must show that but for the ineffective advice, there is a reasonable probability that the plea offer would have been presented to the court, that the court would have accepted its terms, and that the conviction or sentence, or both, under the offer’s terms would have been less severe than under the actual judgment and sentence imposed. Relief in such cases should be tailored to the specific circumstances of each case.
| Zivotofsky v. Clinton | 566 U.S. 189 | March 26, 2012 |
A dispute about the name of a country of origin on a passport not a political question, so it is resolvable by the US court system.
| Credit Suisse Securities (USA) LLC v. Simmonds | 566 U.S. 221 | March 26, 2012 |
Normal equitable tolling principles apply to the statute of limitations for lawsuits under § 16 of the Securities Exchange Act of 1934.
| Setser v. United States | 566 U.S. 231 | March 28, 2012 |
A federal district court has discretion to order that a defendant's federal sentence run consecutively to an anticipated state sentence that has not yet been imposed.
| Vartelas v. Holder | 566 U.S. 257 | March 28, 2012 |
The enforcement of a provision of the Illegal Immigration Reform and Immigrant Responsibility Act of 1996 was improperly applied retroactively to Panagis Vartelas, violating the principle that laws are to be deemed prospective only, absent compelling evidence of congressional intent to apply them retroactively.
| FAA v. Cooper | 566 U.S. 284 | March 28, 2012 |
The authorization of suits against the government for "actual damages" in the Privacy Act of 1974 is not sufficiently clear to constitute a waiver of sovereign immunity from suits for mental and emotional distress.
| Florence v. Bd. of Chosen Freeholders | 566 U.S. 318 | April 2, 2012 |
Officials may strip-search people who have been arrested for any crime before admitting the people to jail, even if there is no reason to suspect that the person is carrying contraband.
| Rehberg v. Paulk | 566 U.S. 356 | April 2, 2012 |
A witness in a grand jury proceeding is entitled to the same absolute immunity from suit under Section 1983 as a witness who testifies at trial.
| Vasquez v. United States | 566 U.S. 376 | April 2, 2012 |
Dismissed as improvidently granted.
| Filarsky v. Delia | 566 U.S. 377 | April 17, 2012 |
A private contractor temporarily retained by the government to carry out its work is entitled to seek qualified immunity from suit under Section 1983.
| Caraco Pharmaceutical Laboratories, Ltd. v. Novo Nordisk A/S | 566 U.S. 399 | April 17, 2012 |
A generic manufacturer may employ the counterclaim provision of the Hatch-Waxman Act to force correction of a use code that inaccurately describes the brand's patent as covering a particular method of using a drug.
| Kappos v. Hyatt | 566 U.S. 431 | April 18, 2012 |
There are no limitations on a plaintiff's ability to introduce new evidence in a §145 proceeding other than those in the Federal Rules of Evidence and the Federal Rules of Civil Procedure
| Mohamad v. Palestinian Auth. | 566 U.S. 449 | April 18, 2012 |
The Torture Victim Protection Act, 28 U.S.C. § 1350, does not permit actions against defendants who are not natural persons.
| Wood v. Milyard | 566 U.S. 463 | April 24, 2012 |
A court abuses its discretion if it raises a timeliness objection on its own after the State deliberately waived a statute of limitations defense.
| United States v. Home Concrete & Supply, LLC | 566 U.S. 478 | April 25, 2012 |
Overstating the value of property sold in order to understate the profit made from the sale does not trigger the extended statute of limitations for the IRS to challenge the seller's tax forms.
| Hall v. United States | 566 U.S. 506 | May 14, 2012 |
The federal income tax liability resulting from a post-petition farm sale is not "incurred by the estate" under §503(b) of the Bankruptcy Code and thus is neither collectible nor dischargeable in a Chapter 12 bankruptcy plan.
| Astrue v. Capato | 566 U.S. 541 | May 21, 2012 |
The SSA's reading is better attuned to the statute's text and its design to benefit primarily those supported by the deceased wage earner in his or her lifetime. Moreover, even if the SSA's longstanding interpretation is not the only reasonable one, it is at least a permissible construction entitled to deference under Chevron U. S. A. Inc. v. Natural Resources Defense Council, Inc..
| Taniguchi v. Kan Pacific Saipan, Ltd. | 566 U.S. 560 | May 21, 2012 |
A person who wins their case and is awarded legal costs cannot be awarded costs for document translation under the Court Interpreters Act.
| Holder v. Martinez Gutierrez | 566 U.S. 583 | May 21, 2012 |
The Board of Immigration Appeals's position that a non-citizen seeking cancellation of a deportation order must individually satisfy lawful permanent resident status requirements rather than relying on a parent's years of that status is based on a permissible construction of the statute.
| Blueford v. Arkansas | 566 U.S. 583 | May 24, 2012 |
The Double Jeopardy Clause does not bar a retrial on certain counts after the jury told the trial court it had voted unanimously against those charges but was deadlocked and unable to reach a verdict on other counts, causing the court to declare a mistrial.
| Freeman v. Quicken Loans, Inc. | 566 U.S. 624 | May 24, 2012 |
To establish a violation of 12 U.S.C. § 2607(b), a plaintiff must demonstrate that a charge for settlement services was divided between two or more persons.
| RadLAX Gateway Hotel, LLC v. Amalgamated Bank | 566 U.S. 639 | May 29, 2012 |
A Chapter 11 cramdown plan may not be confirmed if it provides for the sale of collateral free and clear of a bank's lien but does not permit the bank to credit-bid at the sale.
| Coleman v. Johnson | 566 U.S. 650 | May 29, 2012 |
Per the standard in Jackson v. Virginia, a rational jury could find that Johnson intended to kill Williams based on the evidence presented.
| Reichle v. Howards | 566 U.S. 658 | June 4, 2012 |
Police officers are entitled to qualified immunity from civil suit for allegedly violating a constitutional right if, at the time of an arrest, it was not clearly established that an arrest supported by probable cause could give rise to the alleged rights violation.
| Armour v. City of Indianapolis | 566 U.S. 673 | June 4, 2012 |
Declining to refund people who had paid a lump sum instead of installments into a city program was rationally related to lowering administrative costs, so it did not violate the Equal Protection Clause.
