= Sackett v. Environmental Protection Agency =

Sackett v. Environmental Protection Agency may refer to either of two United States Supreme Court cases:

- Sackett v. Environmental Protection Agency (2012) (alternatively called Sackett I), 570 U.S. 205 (2013), a case in which the Court ruled that orders issued by the EPA under the Clean Water Act are subject to the Administrative Procedure Act.
- Sackett v. Environmental Protection Agency (2023) (alternatively called Sackett II), case 21-454, a case in which the Court limited the scope of the EPA's authority to regulate the waters of the United States.

== See also ==
- List of United States Supreme Court cases
- Lists of United States Supreme Court cases by volume
