= Coleman v. Court of Appeals of Maryland =

- Supreme Court of the United States

Decided March 20, 2012
- Full case name: Coleman v. Court of Appeals of Maryland
- Citations: 566 U.S. 30 (more)

Holding
- Suits under the FMLA's self-care provision are barred by sovereign immunity.

Court membership
- Chief Justice John Roberts Associate Justices Antonin Scalia · Anthony Kennedy; Clarence Thomas · Ruth Bader Ginsburg; Stephen Breyer · Samuel Alito; Sonia Sotomayor · Elena Kagan

Case opinions
- Majority: Kennedy
- Concurrence: Scalia (in judgment)
- Concurrence: Thomas
- Dissent: Ginsburg, joined by Breyer; Sotomayor, Kagan (all but footnote 1)

Laws applied
- Family and Medical Leave Act of 1993

Coleman v. Court of Appeals of Maryland, 566 U.S. 30 (2012), was a United States Supreme Court case in which the court held that suits under the Family and Medical Leave Act of 1993's self-care provision are barred by sovereign immunity. The act allows an employee to take up to 12 weeks off of work to deal with their own serious health condition. However, in this case, a person could not sue the government for an alleged violation of this on gender-discrimination grounds because nobody can sue the government for a violation of that part of the law at all.

== Background ==
The Family and Medical Leave Act of 1993 (FMLA) entitles an employee to take up to 12 work weeks of unpaid leave per year for (A) the care of a newborn son or daughter; (B) the adoption or foster-care placement of a child; (C) the care of a spouse, son, daughter, or parent with a serious medical condition; and (D) the employee’s own serious health condition when the condition interferes with the employee’s ability to perform at work. The FMLA also creates a private right of action for equitable relief and damages "against any employer (including a public agency) in any Federal or State court." In this context, subparagraphs (A), (B), and (C) are referred to as the family-care provisions, and subparagraph (D) as the self-care provision. In Nevada Dept. of Human Resources v. Hibbs, the United States Supreme Court held that Congress could subject states to suit for violations of subparagraph (C) based on evidence of family-leave policies that discriminated on the basis of sex.

Coleman filed suit, alleging that his employer, the Maryland Court of Appeals, an instrumentality of the state, violated the FMLA by denying him self-care leave. The federal District Court dismissed the suit on sovereign-immunity grounds. The Fourth Circuit Court of Appeals affirmed, holding that unlike the family-care provision in Hibbs, the self-care provision was not directed at an identified pattern of gender-based discrimination and was not congruent and proportional to any pattern of sex-based discrimination on the part of states.

== Opinion of the court ==
The Supreme Court issued an opinion on March 20, 2012.

Justice Ruth Bader Ginsburg dissented.
