= Blueford v. Arkansas =

- Supreme Court of the United States

Argued February 22, 2012 Decided May 24, 2012
- Full case name: Alex Blueford v. State of Arkansas
- Docket no.: 10-1320
- Citations: 566 U.S. 599 (more) 132 S. Ct. 2044; 182 L. Ed. 2d 937
- Argument: Oral argument
- Opinion announcement: Opinion announcement

Case history
- Prior: Motion to dismiss denied, No. CR2008-2797, Pulaski County Circuit Court, Fourth Division; affirmed, 2011 Ark. 8, 370 S.W.3d 496, 2011 Ark. LEXIS 7 (Ark. 2011); rehearing denied, 2011 Ark. LEXIS 365 (Ark. 2011); appeal granted sub nom. Blueford v. Arkansas, 132 S. Ct. 397, 181 L. Ed. 2d 255, 2011 U.S. LEXIS 7339 (2011)

Holding
- The Double Jeopardy Clause does not bar a retrial on certain counts after the jury told the trial court it had voted unanimously against those charges but was deadlocked and unable to reach a verdict on other counts, causing the court to declare a mistrial.

Court membership
- Chief Justice John Roberts Associate Justices Antonin Scalia · Anthony Kennedy; Clarence Thomas · Ruth Bader Ginsburg; Stephen Breyer · Samuel Alito; Sonia Sotomayor · Elena Kagan

Case opinions
- Majority: Roberts, joined by Scalia, Kennedy, Thomas, Breyer, Alito
- Dissent: Sotomayor, joined by Ginsburg, Kagan

Laws applied
- U.S. Const. amend. V (Double Jeopardy Clause)

Blueford v. Arkansas, 566 U.S. 599 (2012), was a decision of the Supreme Court of the United States that clarified the limits of the Double Jeopardy Clause. The Supreme Court held that the Double Jeopardy Clause does not bar retrial of counts that a jury had previously unanimously voted to acquit on, when a mistrial is declared after the jury deadlocked on a lesser included offense.

Alex Blueford was tried on capital murder and three lesser included offenses: first-degree murder, manslaughter, and negligent homicide. After deliberating, the jury reported that it had unanimously voted to acquit on the charges of capital murder and first-degree murder, but had deadlocked on manslaughter and had not voted on negligent homicide. The trial court declared a mistrial and denied a motion to dismiss the charges of capital murder and first-degree murder on double jeopardy grounds. The Supreme Court of Arkansas affirmed the denial of the motion on interlocutory appeal.

The Supreme Court affirmed the decision of the Supreme Court of Arkansas. Writing for the majority, Chief Justice Roberts held that because the jury did not formally acquit on any charges, the report of the foreperson that the jury had unanimously voted against capital murder and first-degree murder "lacked the finality" required to prevent a retrial. Further, Chief Justice Roberts found that the trial court's declaration of a mistrial was proper under the circumstances. Dissenting, Justice Sotomayor wrote that the state should not be able to retry Blueford on capital and first-degree murder because the jury had announced its unanimous vote against capital and first-degree murder in open court.

== Background ==
=== Double Jeopardy Clause ===
The Double Jeopardy Clause of the United States Constitution generally prohibits criminally prosecuting a defendant twice for the same offense, mandating that:

No person shall ... be subject for the same offence to be twice put in jeopardy of life or limb.

The Supreme Court has delineated a number of exceptions to this general prohibition. In particular, retrial after a mistrial is governed by the "manifest necessity" rule first outlined by the Supreme Court's decision in United States v. Perez, which held that a retrial is not prohibited by the Double Jeopardy Clause after a mistrial where there is a "manifest necessity" in declaring a mistrial – particularly, following a hung jury.

=== Trial ===
Alex Blueford was tried in August 2009 on charges of capital murder and the lesser included offenses of first-degree murder, manslaughter, and negligent homicide arising from the death of his girlfriend's one-year-old son in November 2007. The trial judge instructed the jury to consider the lesser included offenses of first-degree murder, manslaughter, and negligent homicide only if the jury unanimously voted to acquit Blueford of the more serious charge of capital murder. In the United States, juries must unanimously vote to give a verdict, whether to convict or to acquit. After deliberations, the jury foreperson informed the trial court that the jury was deadlocked. The trial judge and foreperson then engaged in the following colloquy:

THE COURT: All right. If you have your numbers together, and I don't want names, but if you have your numbers I would like to know what your count was on capital murder.
JUROR NUMBER ONE: That was unanimous against that. No.
THE COURT: Okay, on murder in the first degree?
JUROR NUMBER ONE: That was unanimous against that.
THE COURT: Okay. Manslaughter?
JUROR NUMBER ONE: Nine for, three against.
THE COURT: Okay. And negligent homicide?
JUROR NUMBER ONE: We did not vote on that, sir.

The trial judge noted to the attorneys that the jurors "haven't even taken a vote on [negligent homicide].... I don't think they've completed their deliberation.... I mean, under any reasonable circumstances, they would at least take a vote on negligent homicide." The trial judge then ordered the jury to continue deliberations. After further deliberation, the jury reported that it had still not come to a verdict, and the trial court declared a mistrial. The prosecution then decided to retry Blueford on all four original counts, and the trial judge denied Blueford's motion to dismiss the charges of capital murder and first-degree murder on double jeopardy grounds.

=== Supreme Court of Arkansas ===
Upon interlocutory appeal, the Supreme Court of Arkansas affirmed the denial of the motion to dismiss. The Supreme Court of Arkansas wrote that the jury foreperson's announcement that the jury had unanimously voted to acquit Blueford of capital murder and first-degree murder was not final and did not constitute a formal verdict. The Supreme Court of Arkansas further held that the trial court was not required to obtain a "partial verdict" on the capital murder and first-degree murder charges, and that the declaration of a mistrial on all charges was proper even though the jury had unanimously agreed to acquit on capital murder and first-degree murder charges. Accordingly, the Supreme Court of Arkansas held that the Double Jeopardy Clause did not prohibit Blueford's retrial.

== Supreme Court ==
Blueford sought review before the U.S. Supreme Court, which granted certiorari.

=== Arguments ===
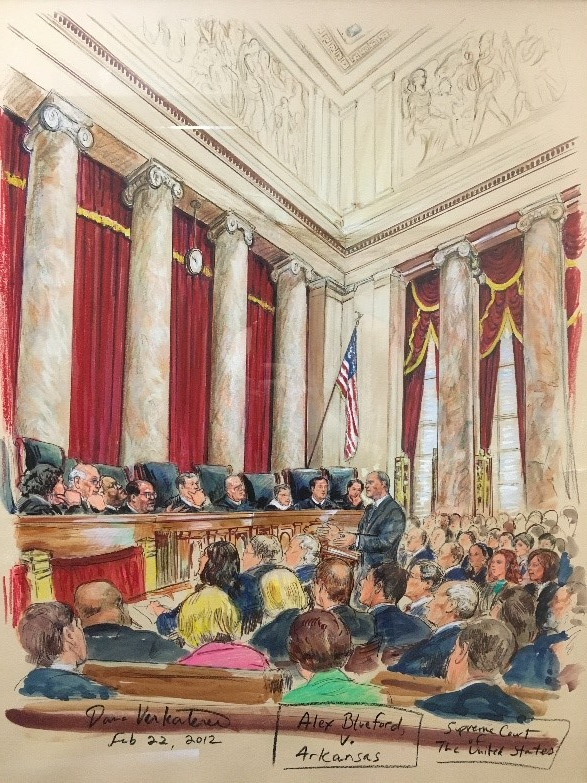
Arkansas Attorney General Dustin McDaniel arguing the state's case before the United States Supreme Court.

Before the Supreme Court, Blueford argued that the Double Jeopardy Clause prohibits a retrial on charges of capital murder and first-degree murder because the foreperson's report that the jury had unanimously voted against those charges acquitted him of those charges. Blueford asserted that even though the jury had not filled out a formal form verdict, the foreperson's clear announcement in open court that the jury had unanimously voted to acquit Blueford of charges constituted a final verdict of acquittal. Additionally, Blueford argued that because the trial court had instructed the jury to consider the lesser included charges only if the jury had unanimously voted to acquit on the more serious charge, the jury's deadlock on manslaughter established that it had acquitted Blueford on capital murder and first-degree murder. Blueford also contended that because a conviction of a lesser included offense implicitly acquits on a more serious offense, a deadlock on a lesser included offense must also implicitly acquit on a more serious offense.

The prosecution replied that the jury never entered a final verdict which would foreclose further prosecution under the Double Jeopardy Clause. The prosecution noted that the foreperson's report was not final, and that the jury continued to deliberate after the foreperson announced the votes, and argued that because the trial judge did not engage in the typical "polling" of jurors to ensure the foreperson's report was truly unanimous, the report could not constitute a final verdict. The prosecution also contended that the trial judge's instructions that the jury unanimously vote that there was a reasonable doubt on one charge before discussing a lesser included charge did not require the jury to "acquit" Blueford because jurors could change their minds.

Various groups submitted arguments as amici curiae. The State of Michigan, joined by 22 states, submitted a brief in support of the prosecution arguing that requiring states to accept partial verdicts would overly coerce jurors. Conversely, the National Association of Criminal Defense Lawyers submitted a brief in support of Blueford asserting that partial verdicts should be required because the importance of double jeopardy protection outweighs any potential coercive effects on jurors.

=== Opinion of the Court ===
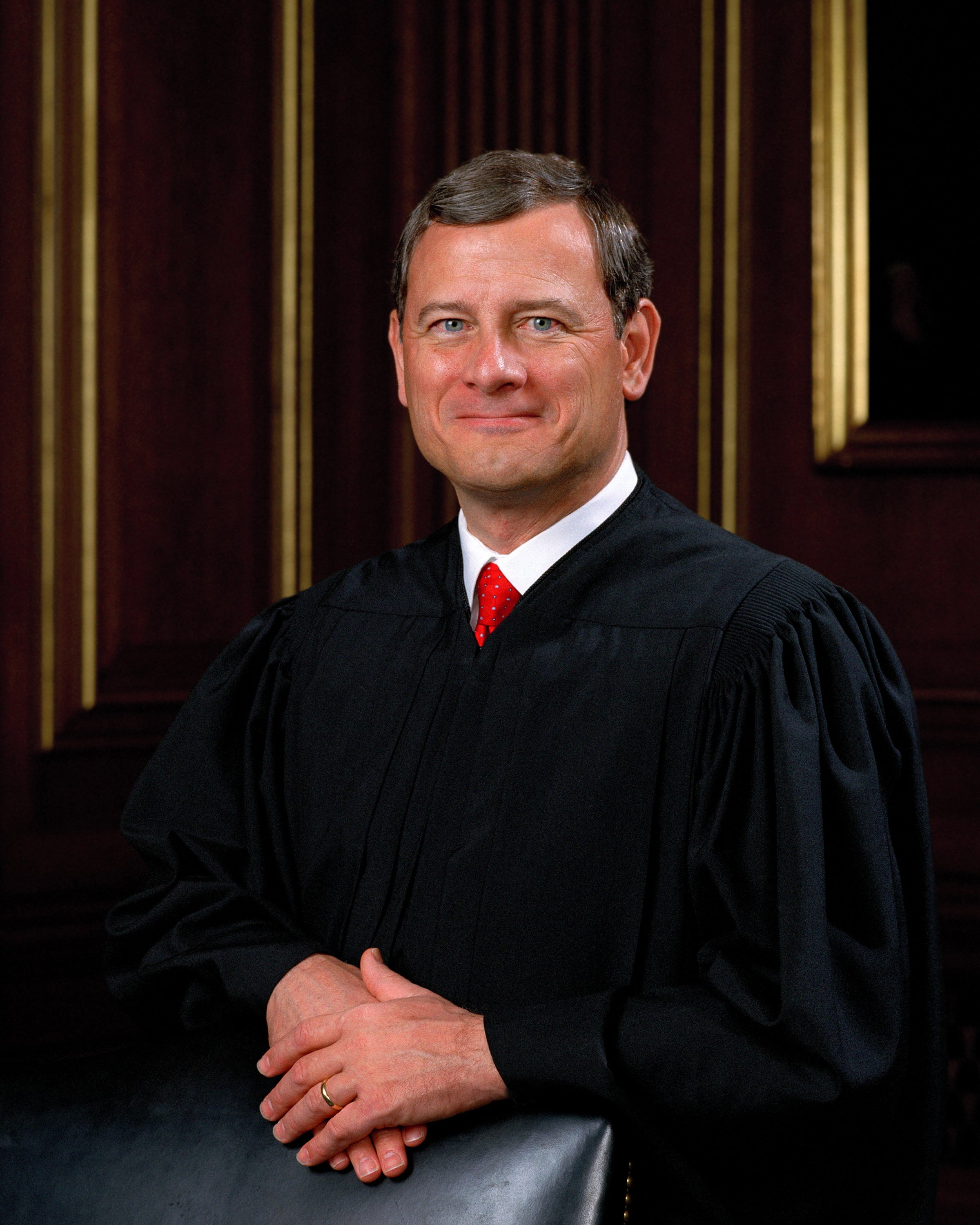
Chief Justice Roberts delivered the opinion of the 6–3 majority.

In May 2012, the Supreme Court issued a decision affirming the Supreme Court of Arkansas by 6–3 vote. Writing for the majority, Chief Justice Roberts held that the foreperson's announcement to the trial court that the jury had unanimously voted to acquit on the charges of capital murder and first-degree murder did not constitute a verdict of acquittal because the jury resumed deliberating after the announcement:

The foreperson's report was not a final resolution of anything. When the foreperson told the court how the jury had voted on each offense, the jury's deliberations had not yet concluded. The jurors in fact went back to the jury room to deliberate further, even after the foreperson had delivered her report. [...] It was therefore possible for Blueford's jury to revisit the offenses of capital and first-degree murder, notwithstanding its earlier votes. And because of that possibility, the foreperson's report prior to the end of deliberations lacked the finality necessary to amount to an acquittal on those offenses, quite apart from any requirement that a formal verdict be returned or judgment entered.

The Court further held that the Constitution does not require states to accept "partial verdicts" before declaring a mistrial in order to retry a defendant in accordance with the Double Jeopardy Clause. The Court noted:

We have never required a trial court, before declaring a mistrial because of a hung jury, to consider any particular means of breaking the impasse—let alone to consider giving the jury new options for a verdict.

The Court accordingly found that there was no double jeopardy bar on retrial.

=== Dissent ===
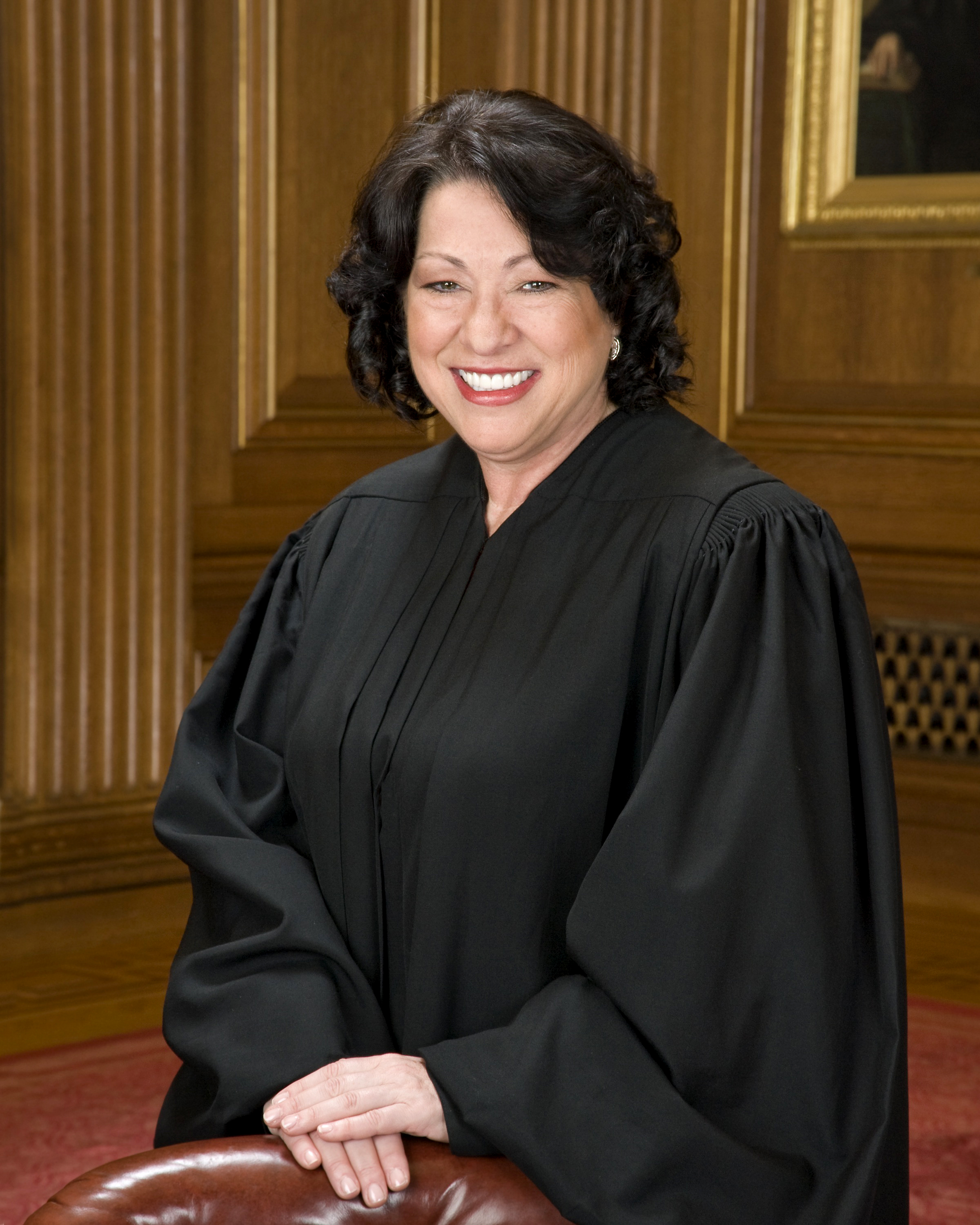
Justice Sotomayor wrote the dissent, joined by two others.

Justice Sotomayor wrote a dissenting opinion joined by Justice Ginsburg and Justice Kagan. Justice Sotomayor wrote that the foreperson's announcement that the jury had unanimously voted against conviction on capital and first-degree murder constituted an acquittal under governing law:

[T]he forewoman's announcement in open court that the jury was "unanimous against" conviction on capital and first-degree murder was an acquittal for double jeopardy purposes. Per Arkansas law, the jury's determination of reasonable doubt as to those offenses was an acquittal "in essence." By deciding that the State "had failed to come forward with sufficient proof," the jury resolved the charges of capital and first-degree murder adversely to the State. That acquittal cannot be reconsidered without putting Blueford twice in jeopardy.

Justice Sotomayor further wrote that states should allow juries to return partial verdicts before declaring mistrials because of hung juries:

I would therefore hold that the Double Jeopardy Clause requires a trial judge, in an acquittal-first jurisdiction, to honor a defendant's request for a partial verdict before declaring a mistrial on the ground of jury deadlock. Courts in acquittal-first jurisdictions have so held. Requiring a partial verdict in an acquittal-first jurisdiction ensures that the jurisdiction takes the bitter with the sweet. In general, an acquittal-first instruction increases the likelihood of conviction on a greater offense.

== Reception ==
Following the Supreme Court's decision, legal analyst Andrew Cohen, writing in The Atlantic, criticized the case as excessively narrowing the protections of the Double Jeopardy Clause, writing that "[t]he fact that it was theoretically possible that the jury could have changed its mind on the Blueford acquittals (during those 31 minutes of additional deliberations) was enough for Roberts and company to reward prosecutors with a second chance to convict Blueford of capital murder." Law review articles also criticized the decision as overly harsh: Warren M. Klinger of the University of Pennsylvania Law Review argued that the Supreme Court's decision was "too rigid", Jalem Peguero of the California Law Review critiqued the decision as "formality over substance", and James Sheppard of the Mississippi Law Journal argued that in light of the decision, "acquit first" states like Arkansas should act to give greater protection to criminal defendants.

== Further trial ==
In June 2013, Blueford made no-contest plea to the first degree murder before a judge in the Pulaski County, Arkansas. In exchange for the plea, prosecutors dropped the charge of capital murder and offered a 10-year prison sentence. Blueford was denied parole in December 2014 due to nature and seriousness of the crime and age of the victim, but was granted parole in December 2016.

Blueford was shot dead in September 2019.

== See also ==
- Double Jeopardy Clause
- List of United States Supreme Court cases, volume 566
