= Taniguchi v. Kan Pacific Saipan, Ltd. =

- Supreme Court of the United States

Decided May 21, 2012
- Full case name: Taniguchi v. Kan Pacific Saipan, Ltd.
- Citations: 566 U.S. 560 (more)

Holding
- A person who wins their case and is awarded legal costs cannot be awarded costs for document translation under the Court Interpreters Act.

Court membership
- Chief Justice John Roberts Associate Justices Antonin Scalia · Anthony Kennedy; Clarence Thomas · Ruth Bader Ginsburg; Stephen Breyer · Samuel Alito; Sonia Sotomayor · Elena Kagan

Case opinions
- Majority: Alito, joined by Roberts, Scalia, Kennedy, Thomas, Kagan
- Dissent: Ginsburg, joined by Breyer, Sotomayor

Laws applied
- Court Interpreters Act

Taniguchi v. Kan Pacific Saipan, Ltd., 566 U.S. 560 (2012), was a United States Supreme Court case in which the court held that a person who wins their case and is awarded legal costs cannot be awarded costs for document translation under the Court Interpreters Act. The court reasoned that the ordinary meaning of "interpreter" is someone who translates orally from one language to another, so the category "compensation of interpreters" in the Court Interpreters Act does not include the cost of document translation.

== Background ==
Title 28 U. S. C. §1920, as amended by the Court Interpreters Act, includes "compensation of interpreters" among the costs that may be awarded to prevailing parties in federal-court lawsuits. §1920(6).

In this case, the District Court awarded costs to Kan Pacific Saipan as the prevailing party in a civil action instituted by Taniguchi, a Japanese baseball player. The award included the cost of translating from Japanese to English certain documents that Taniguchi used in preparing his defense. The Ninth Circuit Court of Appeals affirmed, concluding that §1920(6) covers the cost of translating documents as well as the cost of translating live speech.

== Opinion of the court ==
The Supreme Court issued an opinion on May 21, 2012. The court disagreed with the Ninth Circuit, holding that the act did not include document transcription.

Justice Ginsburg wrote a dissent joined by Justice Breyer. In it, she argued that, although written translation may not be the most common use of the word "interpret," it is at least an acceptable use of the word that had been considered by multiple dictionaries and prior court decisions. Additionally, because some translation task cannot be neatly selected into one category of the other, she thought the creation of law intending to do so was "dubious". Ultimately, she said the act's "prescription on 'interpreters' is not so clear as to leave no room for interpretation."
