= United States v. Home Concrete & Supply, LLC =

- Supreme Court of the United States

Decided April 25, 2012
- Full case name: United States v. Home Concrete & Supply, LLC
- Citations: 566 U.S. 478 (more)

Holding
- Overstating the value of property sold in order to understate the profit made from the sale does not trigger the extended statute of limitations for the IRS to challenge the seller's tax forms.

Court membership
- Chief Justice John Roberts Associate Justices Antonin Scalia · Anthony Kennedy; Clarence Thomas · Ruth Bader Ginsburg; Stephen Breyer · Samuel Alito; Sonia Sotomayor · Elena Kagan

United States v. Home Concrete & Supply, LLC, 566 U.S. 478 (2012), was a United States Supreme Court case in which the court held that overstating the value of property sold in order to understate the profit made from the sale does not trigger the extended statute of limitations for the IRS to challenge the seller's tax forms.

== Background ==
Ordinarily, the government must assess a deficiency against a taxpayer within "3 years after the return was filed" under 26 U. S. C. §6501(a). However, that period is extended to 6 years when a taxpayer "omits from gross income an amount properly includible therein which is in excess of 25 percent of the amount of gross income stated in the return" under §6501(e)(1)(A). Some taxpayers, including Home Concrete & Supply, overstated the basis of certain property that they had sold. As a result, their returns understated the gross income they received from the sale by an amount in excess of 25%. The Commissioner asserted the deficiency outside the 3-year limitations period but within the 6-year period. The Fourth Circuit Court of Appeals concluded that the taxpayers' overstatements of basis, and resulting understatements of gross income, did not trigger the extended limitations period.

== Opinion of the court ==
The Supreme Court issued an opinion on April 25, 2012. The court affirmed. The decision was largely based on Colony, Inc. v. Commissioner, 357 U.S. 28, in which the court had interpreted similar language.
