= Freeman v. Quicken Loans, Inc. =

- Supreme Court of the United States

Decided May 24, 2012
- Full case name: Freeman v. Quicken Loans, Inc.
- Citations: 566 U.S. 624 (more)

Holding
- To establish a violation of 12 U.S.C. § 2607(b), a plaintiff must demonstrate that a charge for settlement services was divided between two or more persons.

Court membership
- Chief Justice John Roberts Associate Justices Antonin Scalia · Anthony Kennedy; Clarence Thomas · Ruth Bader Ginsburg; Stephen Breyer · Samuel Alito; Sonia Sotomayor · Elena Kagan

Case opinion
- Majority: Scalia, joined by unanimous

Laws applied
- Real Estate Settlement Procedures Act

Freeman v. Quicken Loans, Inc., 566 U.S. 624 (2012), was a United States Supreme Court case in which the court held that to establish a violation of 12 U.S.C. § 2607(b), a plaintiff must demonstrate that a charge for settlement services was divided between two or more persons. That statute prohibits a loan servicer from charge or accept money from fee splits that are not attached to actual services rendered to the person seeking the loan.

== Background ==
The Real Estate Settlement Procedures Act (RESPA), provides in 12 U. S. C. §2607(b) that "[n]o person shall give and no person shall accept any portion, split, or percentage of any charge made or received for the rendering of a real estate settlement service... other than for services actually performed." Three couples who obtained mortgage loans from Quicken Loans, including Freeman, filed separate state-court actions, alleging that respondent had violated §2607(b) by charging them fees for which no services were provided in return. After the cases were removed to federal District Court and consolidated, Quicken Loans sought summary judgment, arguing that the plaintiffs' claims were not cognizable under §2607(b) because the allegedly unearned fees were not split with another party. The District Court agreed. Because petitioners had not alleged any splitting of fees, it granted summary judgment. The Fifth Circuit Court of Appeals affirmed.

== Opinion of the court ==
The Supreme Court issued an opinion on May 24, 2012.
