= Judulang v. Holder =

- Supreme Court of the United States

Argued October 12, 2011 Decided December 12, 2011
- Full case name: Joel Judulang v. Eric H. Holder, Jr., Attorney General
- Docket no.: 10–694
- Citations: 565 U.S. 42 (more)
- Argument: Oral argument

Holding
- The Board of Immigration Appeals' comparative-grounds rule is arbitrary and capricious under the Administrative Procedure Act, because its method of determining the eligibility of long-term resident aliens for relief from deportation bears no reasonable relationship to the fitness of the alien to remain in the country or to the policies and purposes of the immigration laws.

Court membership
- Chief Justice John Roberts Associate Justices Antonin Scalia · Anthony Kennedy; Clarence Thomas · Ruth Bader Ginsburg; Stephen Breyer · Samuel Alito; Sonia Sotomayor · Elena Kagan

Case opinion
- Majority: Kagan, joined by unanimous

Laws applied
- 8 U.S.C. § 212(c)

Judulang v. Holder, 565 U.S. 42 (2011), is a decision by the Supreme Court of the United States involving deportation law and procedure. The case involved a rule adopted by the Board of Immigration Appeals for determining the eligibility of certain long-term resident aliens, when they are facing deportation because of a prior criminal conviction, to apply to the Attorney General for relief. In a unanimous opinion delivered by Justice Elena Kagan, the Court invalidated the BIA's "comparable-grounds rule" as arbitrary and capricious, holding that it had no rational relation to the merits of an alien's claim for remaining in the United States, nor to the policy and purposes of the immigration laws.

The rule the Court invalidated only applied to long-term resident aliens who were facing deportation because of a guilty plea entered prior to 1996.

Prior to statutory amendment in 1996, the ability of the Attorney General to extend relief only applied to exclusion proceedings in section 212c, which sought to prevent aliens from entering the country. Despite the lack of a statutory basis, the Attorney General and the BIA had long provided for similar relief to resident aliens in deportation proceedings, to avoid inconsistent and unfair results. The entire system was overhauled by Congress in 1996 and section 212c was repealed. In INS v. St. Cyr, however, the Supreme Court ruled that for those aliens who had entered guilty pleas prior to the statutory change, the same 212c opportunity to apply for relief must be available as was at the time their plea was entered.

By 2005, the BIA adopted the comparative-grounds rule, which compared the statutory ground into which the alien's conviction had been classified for deportation with the statutory grounds from which aliens seeking entry into the U.S. could seek relief from exclusion. If there was not an exclusion ground that was comparable in type and scope, the alien could not apply for relief, even if the particular crime for which deportation was sought would have been covered by one of the exclusion grounds. The Court invalidated the rule, finding its statutory comparison irrelevant and the arbitrary equivalent of a coin toss.

In an editorial, The New York Times characterized the Court's "stinging opinion" as reinforcing the "message that lower courts have been sending for many years: the law applied in immigration cases too often fails to meet the standards of justice."

== Background of the case ==
=== Development of the waiver in deportation hearings and the comparable-grounds rule ===
Prior to 1996, the immigration statutes permitted the Attorney General to waive the inadmissibility of [long-term resident] aliens seeking to enter the country, if their exclusion was being sought for prior criminal convictions, except for certain grounds deemed nonwaivable. The statute did not provide for a similar waiver for aliens facing deportation, however, which led to inconsistent results based on irrelevant differences, such as that an alien who briefly left the country but then sought to reenter was eligible for a waiver, but not an alien who never left the country, even if both had the same prior conviction. In a series of decisions beginning with Attorney General Robert H. Jackson in 1940, and built upon by the BIA and the federal courts, the Attorney General's discretionary waiver power was thus extended to aliens facing deportation notwithstanding its lack of a statutory basis.

In 1996, Congress repealed section 212(c), instituted new proceedings for both deportations and exclusions (now a unified removal proceeding), and expanded the grounds for which waiver was not available. The Supreme Court in INS v. St. Cyr, however, ruled that the waiver must be made available on the same terms as before for those aliens who had pleaded guilty prior to 1996, as this guilty plea may have been entered in reliance on the availability of the possibility of waiver. The pre-1996 waiver, for both exclusion and deportation, thus had an "afterlife" for those aliens with pre-1996 guilty pleas.

The issue remained that the pre-1996 statutory grounds for exclusion differed from the pre-1996 statutory grounds for deportation. By 2005, the BIA had adopted the comparative-grounds rule to determine when aliens facing deportation were eligible for a waiver.

=== Lower administrative and court proceedings ===
Joel Judulang, a citizen of the Philippines, had been a continuous lawful permanent resident of the U.S. since 1974, when he entered the country at the age of eight. After participating in a fight in which another person shot and killed someone, Judulang pleaded guilty to voluntary manslaughter in 1989 and received a suspended sentence and probation. In 2005, he pleaded guilty to another crime involving theft. DHS subsequently commenced a removal action to deport him, charging him with having committed an "aggravated felony" involving "a crime of violence," based on his old manslaughter conviction. 8 U.S.C. §§1101(a)(43)(F), 1227(a)(2)(A)(iii).

In 2005, an immigration judge ruled that Judulang was removable, and the BIA dismissed Judulang's claim that he received derivative U.S. citizenship through his parents, who became naturalized citizens. The 9th Circuit affirmed in 2007 and denied to grant a rehearing en banc.

The Immigration Judge ordered Judulang's deportation, and the BIA affirmed. As part of its decision, the BIA considered whether Judulang could apply for §212(c) relief. It held that he could not do so because the "crime of violence" deportation ground is not comparable to any exclusion ground, including the one for crimes involving moral turpitude. App. to Pet. for Cert. 8a. The Court of Appeals for the Ninth Circuit denied Judulang's petition for review in reliance on circuit precedent upholding the BIA's comparable-grounds approach. Judulang v. Gonzales, 249 Fed. Appx. 499, 502 (2007).

== The Supreme Court's decision ==
Justice Elena Kagan delivered the Court's unanimous opinion, reversing the Ninth Circuit's decision. Noting that although the arbitrary and capricious test is not a high hurdle to pass, the Court wrote that "[t]he BIA has flunked that test here. By hinging a deportable alien’s eligibility for discretionary relief on the chance correspondence between statutory categories—a matter irrelevant to the alien’s fitness to reside in this country—the BIA has failed to exercise its discretion in a reasoned manner."

"Rather than considering factors that might be thought germane to the deportation decision, that policy hinges §212(c) eligibility on an irrelevant comparison between statutory provisions. Recall that the BIA asks whether the set of offenses in a particular deportation ground lines up with the set in an exclusion ground. But so what if it does? Does an alien charged with a particular deportation ground become more worthy of relief because that ground happens to match up with another? Or less worthy of relief because the ground does not? The comparison in no way changes the alien's prior offense or his other attributes and circumstances. So it is difficult to see why that comparison should matter. Each of these statutory grounds contains a slew of offenses. Whether each contains the same slew has nothing to do with whether a deportable alien whose prior conviction falls within both grounds merits the ability to seek a waiver."

Re: that Judulang's deportation ground does not sufficiently overlap with the most similar exclusion ground, "That fact is as extraneous to the merits of the case as a coin flip would be."

"And underneath this layer of arbitrariness lies yet another, because the outcome of the Board's comparable-grounds analysis itself may rest on the happenstance of an immigration official's charging decision." "So at base everything hangs on the fortuity of an individual official's decision. An alien appearing before one official may suffer deportation; an identically situated alien appearing before another may gain the right to stay in this country."

The Government offered three main arguments in support of the comparable-grounds rule, all of which the Court found them all unpersuasive. First, the Government argued that the text of the pre-1996 statute supported its rule, because it set forth excludable grounds that the AG could waive; the comparable-grounds rule thus matched the deportation waiver to those statutory grounds. The Court considered this a misinterpretation of §212(c), which instead says that the Attorney General may admit any excludable alien except if the alien is charged with two specified grounds; "that means that once the Attorney General determines that the alien is not being excluded for those two reasons, the ground of exclusion no longer matters. At that point, the alien is eligible for relief, and the thing the Attorney General waives is not a particular exclusion ground, but the simple denial of entry." The Court further pointed out that the statute only covered exclusion and so its language can provide no support for a choice of deportation procedures.

Second, the Government claimed that it had been using the rule for a long time. This was a "slender reed" to base its rule upon, the Court wrote, and cannot change the arbitrariness of the rule; a coin toss for the thousandth time is just as arbitrary as the first time. The Court also did not believe the rule had the history the Government asserted, finding that there was confusion such that its application prior to 2005 was inconsistent.

Third, the Government claimed that the rule was a cost saver. This alone could not justify it; flipping a coin would also be cheap.

Though Judulang argued that relief for aliens facing deportation should be available on the same terms as those facing exclusion, the Court found it unnecessary to resolve that issue.
