= Setser v. United States =

- Supreme Court of the United States

Decided March 28, 2012
- Full case name: Setser v. United States
- Citations: 566 U.S. 231 (more)

Holding
- A federal district court has discretion to order that a defendant's federal sentence run consecutively to an anticipated state sentence that has not yet been imposed.

Court membership
- Chief Justice John Roberts Associate Justices Antonin Scalia · Anthony Kennedy; Clarence Thomas · Ruth Bader Ginsburg; Stephen Breyer · Samuel Alito; Sonia Sotomayor · Elena Kagan

Case opinions
- Majority: Scalia
- Dissent: Breyer, joined by Kennedy, Ginsburg

Setser v. United States, 566 U.S. 231 (2012), was a United States Supreme Court case in which the court held that a federal district court has discretion to order that a defendant's federal sentence run consecutively to an anticipated state sentence that has not yet been imposed.

== Background ==
When Monroe Ace Setser was indicted in a Texas court on drug charges, the state also moved to revoke the probation term that he was then serving for another drug offense. At about the same time, Setser pleaded guilty to federal drug charges. The federal District Court imposed a 151-month sentence to run consecutively to any state sentence imposed for the probation violation but concurrently with any state sentence imposed on the new drug charge. While Setser's federal appeal was pending, the state court sentenced him to 5 years for the probation violation and 10 years for the drug charge but ordered the sentences to be served concurrently.

The Fifth Circuit Court of Appeals affirmed the federal sentence, holding that the District Court had authority to order a sentence consecutive to an anticipated state sentence and that Setser's sentence was reasonable, even if the state court’s decision made it unclear exactly how to administer it.

== Opinion of the court ==
The Supreme Court issued an opinion on March 28, 2012.

In dissent, Justice Stephen Breyer objected that this sort of anticipatory sentencing decision was inappropriate "[b]ecause the sentencing judge normally does not yet know enough about the behavior that underlies (or will underlie) a sentence that has not yet been imposed."
