= Credit Suisse Securities (USA) LLC v. Simmonds =

- Supreme Court of the United States

Argued November 29, 2011 Decided March 26, 2012
- Full case name: Credit Suisse Securities (USA) LLC, et al., Petitioners v. Vanessa Simmonds
- Docket no.: 10-1261
- Citations: 566 U.S. 221 (more) 132 S. Ct. 1414; 182 L. Ed. 2d 446; 80 U.S.L.W. 4269

Case history
- Prior: 638 F.3d 1072 (9th Cir. 2010); cert. granted, 564 U.S. 1036 (2011).
- Subsequent: On remand, 678 F.3d 1139 (9th Cir. 2012).

Holding
- Normal equitable tolling principles apply to the statute of limitations for lawsuits under § 16 of the Securities Exchange Act of 1934.

Court membership
- Chief Justice John Roberts Associate Justices Antonin Scalia · Anthony Kennedy; Clarence Thomas · Ruth Bader Ginsburg; Stephen Breyer · Samuel Alito; Sonia Sotomayor · Elena Kagan

Case opinion
- Majority: Scalia, joined by Kennedy, Thomas, Ginsburg, Breyer, Alito, Sotomayor, Kagan
- Roberts took no part in the consideration or decision of the case.

Laws applied
- Securities Exchange Act, 1934

Credit Suisse Securities (USA) LLC v. Simmonds, 566 U.S. 221 (2012), is a United States Supreme Court decision regarding the limitation period for insider trading claims. The court ruled in an 8-0 unanimous opinion that the limitation period was subject to traditional equitable tolling. Chief Justice John Roberts recused himself from the case.

== Background ==
In 2007, Vanessa Simmonds, a recent college graduate, simultaneously filed lawsuits against eleven investment banks involving fifty-five initial public offerings accusing them of abuses during the internet firm IPOs from 1999 to 2001 that eventually led to the dot com bust. Amongst her lawyers was her father David Simmonds who had earlier successfully argued a similar case against an internet start-up resulting in the largest judgment and recovery to date under Section 16(b) of the Security Exchange Act of 1934. The plaintiffs argued that the financial institutions violated Section 16(b) by not disclosing "short-swing" transactions as required under Section 16(a) of the Security Exchange Act, that is trades occurring over a period of less than six months. A federal district court consolidated the nearly identical cases and granted a motion to dismiss, stating that the two year limitation on the period on Section 16(b) had expired. On appeal, the United States Court of Appeals for the Ninth Circuit reversed the decision, stating that the two-year period was tolled until the "insider" or party benefitting from the profit had disclosed the transaction.

== Supreme Court ==
The Supreme Court, in a majority opinion written by Justice Scalia remanded and vacated the lower court's decision, ruling that the limitations period for Section 16(b) was subject to traditional equitable tolling.
