= Mims v. Arrow Financial Services, LLC =

- Supreme Court of the United States

Decided January 18, 2012
- Full case name: Mims v. Arrow Financial Services, LLC
- Citations: 565 U.S. 368 (more)

Holding
- Federal and state courts have concurrent jurisdiction over private suits arising under the TCPA.

Court membership
- Chief Justice John Roberts Associate Justices Antonin Scalia · Anthony Kennedy; Clarence Thomas · Ruth Bader Ginsburg; Stephen Breyer · Samuel Alito; Sonia Sotomayor · Elena Kagan

Case opinion
- Majority: Ginsburg, joined by unanimous

Mims v. Arrow Financial Services, LLC, 565 U.S. 368 (2012), was a United States Supreme Court case in which the court held that federal and state courts have concurrent jurisdiction over private suits arising under the Telephone Consumer Protection Act of 1991.

== Background ==
Consumer complaints about abuses of telephone technology—for example, computerized calls to private homes—prompted Congress to pass the Telephone Consumer Protection Act of 1991 (TCPA). Congress determined that federal legislation was needed because telemarketers, by operating interstate, were escaping state-law prohibitions on intrusive nuisance calls. The act bans certain invasive telemarketing practices and directs the Federal Communications Commission (FCC) to prescribe implementing regulations. It authorizes States to bring civil actions to enjoin prohibited practices and recover damages on their residents' behalf, and it provides that jurisdiction over these state-initiated suits lies exclusively in the federal district courts. It also permits a private person to seek redress for violations of the act or regulations "in an appropriate court of [a] State," "if [such an action is] otherwise permitted by the laws or rules of court of [that] State."

Marcus Mims filed a damages action in federal District Court, alleging that Arrow, seeking to collect a debt, violated the TCPA by repeatedly using an automatic telephone dialing system or prerecorded or artificial voice to call Mims's cellular phone without his consent. Mims invoked the court's "federal question" jurisdiction, i.e., its authority to adjudicate claims "arising under the... laws... of the United States." The District Court, affirmed by the Eleventh Circuit Court of Appeals, dismissed Mims's complaint for want of subject-matter jurisdiction, concluding that the TCPA had vested jurisdiction over private actions exclusively in state courts.

== Opinion of the court ==
The Supreme Court issued an opinion on January 18, 2012. The Supreme Court reversed the lower courts.
