= Wood v. Milyard =

- Supreme Court of the United States

Decided April 24, 2012
- Full case name: Wood v. Milyard
- Citations: 566 U.S. 463 (more)

Holding
- A court abuses its discretion if it raises a timeliness objection on its own after the State deliberately waived a statute of limitations defense.

Court membership
- Chief Justice John Roberts Associate Justices Antonin Scalia · Anthony Kennedy; Clarence Thomas · Ruth Bader Ginsburg; Stephen Breyer · Samuel Alito; Sonia Sotomayor · Elena Kagan

Case opinions
- Majority: Ginsburg, joined by Roberts, Kennedy, Breyer, Alito, Sotomayor, Kagan
- Concurrence: Thomas, joined by Scalia

Laws applied
- Antiterrorism and Effective Death Penalty Act

Wood v. Milyard, 566 U.S. 463 (2012), was a United States Supreme Court case in which the court held that a court abuses its discretion if it raises a timeliness objection on its own after the State deliberately waived a statute of limitations defense.

== Background ==
In 1987, Patrick Wood was convicted of murder and other crimes by a Colorado court and sentenced to life imprisonment. Wood filed a federal habeas petition in 2008. After receiving Wood's petition, the federal District Court asked the State if it planned to argue that the petition was untimely. In response, the State twice informed the District Court that it would "not challenge, but [was] not conceding," the timeliness of Wood's petition. Thereafter, the District Court rejected Wood's claims on the merits. On appeal, the Tenth Circuit Court of Appeals ordered the parties to brief both the merits and the timeliness of Wood's petition. After briefing, the court held the petition time barred, concluding that the court had authority to raise timeliness on its own motion, and that the State had not taken the issue off the table by declining to raise a statute of limitations defense in the District Court.

== Opinion of the court ==
A Supreme Court decision was rendered on April 24, 2012. According to the court, a court of appeals, just like a district court, can raise its own timeliness defense in certain instances, but this is something that the court does not have to do.

== Later developments ==
According to the Supreme Court, the appeals court misused its legal authority and resurrected the limitations issue. The district court had already decided Wood's constitutional arguments like his Sixth Amendment claims and the Supreme Court said that the Tenth Circuit should've reviewed the constitutional issues instead of dismissing the case on procedural grounds.

The Supreme Court overturned the Tenth Circuit's decision and sent the case back to the Tenth Circuit. The Tenth Circuit needed to follow the instructions of the Supreme Court. It couldn't dismiss the petition based on the statute of limitations since the State had intentionally waived the defense.

Later, the Tenth Circuit addressed the merits. The court had to check if his constitutional rights had actually been violated. The Tenth Circuit reviewed the Double Jeopardy claim and the Sixth Amendment claim. After considering the merits, the Tenth Circuit ruled that that his Double Jeopardy rights have been violated since he'd been convicted of first-degree murder and second-degree murder for the same killing. Because he had both murder convictions for the same murder, the court vacated, or making it no longer legally valid, one of the murder convictions. His life sentence still remained.
