= Vartelas v. Holder =

- Supreme Court of the United States

Argued January 18, 2012 Decided March 28, 2012
- Full case name: Panagis Vartelas, Petitioner v. Eric H. Holder, Jr., Attorney General
- Docket no.: 10-1211
- Citations: 566 U.S. 257 (more) 132 S. Ct. 1479; 182 L. Ed. 2d 473; 2012 U.S. LEXIS 2540; 80 U.S.L.W. 4281
- Argument: Oral argument

Case history
- Prior: Plaintiff denied reentry and removed (Bd. Immigr. 2003); affirmed, 2009 WL 331200 (Bd. Immigr. App. 2008); affirmed, 620 F.3d 108 (2nd Cir. 2010); certiorari granted, 564 U.S. 1066 (2011).

Holding
- The enforcement of a provision of the Illegal Immigration Reform and Immigrant Responsibility Act of 1996 was improperly applied retroactively to Panagis Vartelas, violating the principle that laws are to be deemed prospective only, absent compelling evidence of congressional intent to apply them retroactively.

Court membership
- Chief Justice John Roberts Associate Justices Antonin Scalia · Anthony Kennedy; Clarence Thomas · Ruth Bader Ginsburg; Stephen Breyer · Samuel Alito; Sonia Sotomayor · Elena Kagan

Case opinions
- Majority: Ginsburg, joined by Roberts, Kennedy, Breyer, Sotomayor, Kagan
- Dissent: Scalia, joined by Thomas, Alito

Laws applied
- Illegal Immigration Reform and Immigrant Responsibility Act of 1996

Vartelas v. Holder, 566 U.S. 257 (2012), was a United States Supreme Court case in which the Court held that the enforcement of a provision of the Illegal Immigration Reform and Immigrant Responsibility Act of 1996 was applied retroactively to Panagis Vartelas and was thus unconstitutional.

== Background ==
In the early 1990s, Panagis Vartelas, a Greek immigrant to the United States, got involved with counterfeiting traveler's cheques. Vartelas pleaded guilty in 1994 to "conspiracy to make or possess a counterfeit security."

In January 2003, Vartelas took a one-week trip to Greece. While returning through John F. Kennedy Airport, an immigration officer questioned Vartelas about his 1994 conviction. In March 2003, Vartelas was served a notice to appear for removal proceedings "because he had been convicted of a crime involving moral turpitude in 1994."

Vartelas appeared before an immigration judge in a series of hearings. In 2006, an immigration judge denied Vartelas' application for waiver and ordered Vartelas removed to Greece. Vartelas made a timely appeal to the Board of Immigration Appeals, which the board dismissed.

Vartelas subsequently filed a motion to reopen with the Board of Immigration Appeals. The motion to reopen "claimed that Vartelas' prior counsel was ineffective having failed to raise the issue of whether 8 U.S.C. § 1101(a)(13)(C)(v) could be applied retroactively." The Board of Immigration Appeals denied the motion to reopen; Vartelas filed a petition for review with the United States Court of Appeals for the Second Circuit. The Second Circuit denied the petition for review; Vartelas appealed the Second Circuit's decision to the United States Supreme Court.

== Opinion of the Court ==
In a 6–3 opinion written by Justice Ruth Bader Ginsburg, the Court held that the enforcement of a provision of the Illegal Immigration Reform and Immigrant Responsibility Act of 1996 was improperly applied retroactively to Panagis Vartelas. Normally, laws are presumed to apply prospectively only. Absent clear evidence of a congressional intent that the law operate retroactively, it was error to do so Justice Ginsburg's opinion was joined by Chief Justice John Roberts and Justices Anthony Kennedy, Stephen Breyer, Sonia Sotomayor, and Elena Kagan.

Justice Antonin Scalia wrote a dissenting opinion in which he stated that "we should concern ourselves with the statute's actual operation on regulated parties, not with retroactivity as an abstract concept or as a substitute for fairness concerns." He was joined in his opinion by Justices Clarence Thomas and Samuel Alito. Scalia held that the law was not applied retroactively under a "commonsense approach" to the statute and therefore this was a "relatively easy case."

== See also ==
- List of United States Supreme Court cases, volume 566
