= RadLAX Gateway Hotel, LLC v. Amalgamated Bank =

- Supreme Court of the United States

Decided May 29, 2012
- Full case name: RadLAX Gateway Hotel, LLC v. Amalgamated Bank
- Citations: 566 U.S. 639 (more)

Holding
- A Chapter 11 cramdown plan may not be confirmed if it provides for the sale of collateral free and clear of a bank's lien but does not permit the bank to credit-bid at the sale.

Court membership
- Chief Justice John Roberts Associate Justices Antonin Scalia · Anthony Kennedy; Clarence Thomas · Ruth Bader Ginsburg; Stephen Breyer · Samuel Alito; Sonia Sotomayor · Elena Kagan

Case opinion
- Majority: Scalia, joined by unanimous
- Kennedy took no part in the consideration or decision of the case.

RadLAX Gateway Hotel, LLC v. Amalgamated Bank, 566 U.S. 639 (2012), was a United States Supreme Court case in which the court held that a Chapter 11 cramdown plan may not be confirmed if it provides for the sale of collateral free and clear of a bank's lien but does not permit the bank to credit-bid at the sale.

== Background ==
To finance the purchase of a commercial property and associated renovation and construction costs, debtors including RadLAX Gateway Hotel obtained a secured loan from an investment fund, for which Amalgamated Bank (Bank) serves as trustee. The debtors ultimately became insolvent, and sought relief under Chapter 11 of the Bankruptcy Code. Pursuant to 11 U. S. C. §1129(b)(2)(A), the debtors sought to confirm a "cramdown" bankruptcy plan over the Bank's objection. That plan proposed selling substantially all of the debtors' property at an auction, and using the sale proceeds to repay the Bank. Under the debtors' proposed auction procedures, the Bank would not be permitted to bid for the property using the debt it is owed to offset the purchase price, a practice known as "credit-bidding." The Bankruptcy Court denied the debtors' request, concluding that the auction procedures did not comply with §1129(b)(2)(A)'s requirements for cramdown plans. The Seventh Circuit Court of Appeals affirmed, holding that §1129(b)(2)(A) does not permit debtors to sell an encumbered asset free and clear of a lien without permitting the lienholder to credit-bid.

== Opinion of the court ==
The Supreme Court issued an opinion on May 29, 2012.
