= Martinez v. Ryan =

- Supreme Court of the United States

Argued October 4, 2011 Decided March 20, 2012
- Full case name: Luis Mariano Martinez v. Charles L. Ryan, Director, Arizona Department of Corrections
- Docket no.: 10-1001
- Citations: 566 U.S. 1 (more) 132 S. Ct. 1309; 182 L. Ed. 2d 272
- Argument: Oral argument

Case history
- Prior: Martinez v. Schriro, 623 F.3d 731 (9th Cir. 2010)
- Subsequent: Martinez v. Ryan, 680 F.3d 1160 (9th Cir. 2012)

Holding
- A federal court can still hear an incarcerated person's untimely appeal where state law requires them to raise claims of ineffective lawyers after their trial and does not provide them with proper legal help.

Court membership
- Chief Justice John Roberts Associate Justices Antonin Scalia · Anthony Kennedy; Clarence Thomas · Ruth Bader Ginsburg; Stephen Breyer · Samuel Alito; Sonia Sotomayor · Elena Kagan

Case opinions
- Majority: Kennedy, joined by Roberts, Ginsburg, Breyer, Alito, Sotomayor, and Kagan
- Dissent: Scalia, joined by Thomas

Martinez v. Ryan, 566 U.S. 1 (2012) was a United States Supreme Court case that created a small exception to a previous ruling, Coleman v. Thompson. Normally, if a prisoner misses a deadline to file an appeal under state law, federal courts cannot review their case—even if their lawyer made a mistake. Coleman had ruled that ineffective assistance of counsel during appeals does not excuse this kind of procedural default.

However, the Martinez decision said that in very specific situations—where state law requires prisoners to raise claims of ineffective lawyers after their trial and does not provide them with proper legal help—then a federal court can still hear their case. This exception applies only if the prisoner never got a real chance to fairly argue their constitutional claim.

== Background ==
Luis Mariano Martinez was accused of sexual misconduct with his eleven-year-old stepdaughter. He was convicted on two counts of sexual conduct with someone under the age of fifteen and was sentenced to two consecutive terms of thirty-five years to life.

== Case history ==
After the Arizona Court of Appeals affirmed Martinez's conviction on direct appeal, his state-appointed lawyer filed a notice of post-conviction relief without notifying Martinez. She later filed a statement that she could not find any colorable claims. According to Martinez she did not tell him that he had 45 days to file a pro se petition to raise the ineffective assistance claim. Martinez missed the deadline and the state trial court dismissed the collateral action. Although there is no constitutional right to post conviction counsel, Arizona state law required the appointment of counsel for the first round of collateral post-conviction proceedings. The state law did not allow ineffective assistance claims to be made on direct appeal.

Martinez obtained a second lawyer who filed a new petition for post-conviction relief that alleged ineffective assistance on the part of Martinez's trial lawyer. He alleged, inter alia, that his trial counsel should have called an expert to rebut the prosecution's expert testimony explaining the victim's recantation. There was no dispute that Arizona's preclusion rule barring "successive petitions" was an independent and adequate state ground; federal courts would have no jurisdiction to hear the ineffective assistance claim unless the defendant showed cause for the default.

The Arizona Supreme Court dismissed the petition. Martinez then petitioned the district court arguing that ineffective assistance of counsel in the first post-conviction proceeding excused the procedural default. The United States District Court for the District of Arizona denied the petition because the Arizona preclusion rule was an "adequate and independent" state ground and attorney error in post-conviction proceedings was not cause for procedural default. The District Court's decision was unanimously affirmed by the United States Court of Appeals for the Ninth Circuit. The Supreme Court granted certiorari.

== Supreme Court decision ==
On March 20, 2012, the Supreme Court issued a 7–2 decision written by Justice Anthony Kennedy, holding that procedurally defaulted ineffective assistance claims are not barred where state law requires the claim to be raised in a post-conviction collateral proceeding and there was no counsel appointed or the counsel in an initial-review collateral proceeding was ineffective under Strickland.

The Court said the right to effective assistance of counsel was a "bedrock principle in our justice system". The equitable ruling did not recognize a constitutional right to collateral review counsel. States were not required to appoint post-conviction counsel but would not be able to assert procedural default if they did not: "When an attorney errs in initial-review collateral proceedings, it is likely that no state court at any level will hear the prisoner's claim."

The holding created a "narrow exception" to Coleman v. Thompson's procedural default rule. Coleman held that attorney error in post-conviction appeals was not cause to excuse procedural default but did not apply "in those cases where state collateral review is the first place a prisoner can present a challenge to his conviction". The judgment of the Court of Appeals was reversed and remanded.

=== Dissent ===
Justice Antonin Scalia dissented and was joined by Justice Clarence Thomas. Scalia claimed that the majority opinion created a constitutional right to effective counsel in all collateral hearings.

== Reactions ==
Following the decision, the American Bar Association, which had submitted an amicus brief in the case, stated "this welcome decision is in accord with longstanding policy of the American Bar Association" and claimed that this "significant ruling will help ensure fairness and justice for many criminal defendants throughout the country."

== Subsequent developments ==
The impact of Martinez is not fully understood. Statistics are not collected for post-conviction proceedings so it is unknown how many non-capital prisoners seek post-conviction relief each year in state courts. There simply is not the data to make definite empirical observations.

Lower courts have declined to expand Martinez to Brady claims, appeals from "initial-review collateral proceedings", successive petitions, claims that could have been raised on direct appeal under state law and claims that have been time-barred by AEDPA's statute of limitations.

The Fifth Circuit in Gallow v. Cooper applied Cullen v. Pinholster to limit claims to the state record when the ineffective assistance claim was substantively denied and there was no procedural default to overcome. Gallow does not foreclose possibility that a district court would excuse the procedural default when state habeas counsel does not raise any ineffective assistance claim.

States that allowed ineffective assistance claims on direct appeal argued that Martinez did not apply to them. The Eighth Circuit ruled in Dansby v. Norris that "Martinez" does not apply in states that allow ineffective assistance claims on direct appeal. The Fifth Circuit ruled in Gates v. Thaler that Martinez did not apply in Texas but the Supreme Court reversed in Trevino v. Thaler.

It remains unlikely after Martinez that ineffective assistance of counsel claims will change the outcome of state post-conviction cases. At least some district courts have continued after Martinez to deny claims that are contradicted by the record, do not allege facts that would entitle a petitioner to relief or fail to show prejudice.

== See also ==
- Shinn v. Ramirez
