= Kappos v. Hyatt =

- Supreme Court of the United States

Argued January 9, 2012 Decided April 18, 2012
- Full case name: David Kappos, Undersecretary of Commerce for Intellectual Property and Director, United States Patent and Trademark Office v. Gilbert P. Hyatt
- Docket no.: 10-1219
- Citations: 566 U.S. 431 (more) 132 S. Ct. 1690; 182 L. Ed. 2d 704; 2012 U.S. LEXIS 3107; 80 U.S.L.W. 4333; 102 U.S.P.Q.2d 1337
- Argument: Oral argument

Case history
- Prior: Decision against petitioner, unreported (BPAI 2001); summary judgement for defendant sub nom. Hyatt v. Dudas, 2006 WL 4606037 (D.D.C. 2005); affirmed sub nom. Hyatt v. Doll, 576 F.3d 1246 (Fed. Cir. 2009); vacated and remanded on en banc rehearing, 625 F.3d 1320 (Fed. Cir. 2010); certiorari granted, 131 S.Ct. 3064 (2011)

Holding
- There are no limitations on a plaintiff's ability to introduce new evidence in a §145 proceeding other than those in the Federal Rules of Evidence and the Federal Rules of Civil Procedure

Court membership
- Chief Justice John Roberts Associate Justices Antonin Scalia · Anthony Kennedy; Clarence Thomas · Ruth Bader Ginsburg; Stephen Breyer · Samuel Alito; Sonia Sotomayor · Elena Kagan

Case opinions
- Majority: Thomas, joined by unanimous
- Concurrence: Sotomayor, joined by Breyer

Laws applied
- 35 U.S.C. § 145

Kappos v. Hyatt, 566 U.S. 431 (2012), was a case decided by the Supreme Court of the United States that held that there are no limitations on a plaintiff's ability to introduce new evidence in a §145 proceeding other than those in the Federal Rules of Evidence and the Federal Rules of Civil Procedure.

The petitioner in the case was David Kappos, who was then serving as Director of the United States Patent and Trademark Office (USPTO).
