= PPL Montana, LLC v. Montana =

- Supreme Court of the United States

Decided February 22, 2012
- Full case name: PPL Montana, LLC v. Montana
- Citations: 565 U.S. 576 (more)

Holding
- The equal-footing doctrine gives a state title to a segment of a river if that segment was navigable at the time the state enters the union; else, it remained in control of the federal government and could be sold by the government.

Court membership
- Chief Justice John Roberts Associate Justices Antonin Scalia · Anthony Kennedy; Clarence Thomas · Ruth Bader Ginsburg; Stephen Breyer · Samuel Alito; Sonia Sotomayor · Elena Kagan

Case opinion
- Majority: Kennedy, joined by unanimous

PPL Montana, LLC v. Montana, 565 U.S. 576 (2012), was a United States Supreme Court case in which the court held that the equal-footing doctrine gives a state title to a segment of a river if that segment was navigable at the time the state enters the union; else, it remained in control of the federal government and could be sold by the government.

== Background ==
PPL Montana, LLC (PPL) owns and operates hydroelectric facilities in Montana. Ten of its facilities are located on riverbeds underlying segments of the Missouri, Madison, and Clark Fork Rivers. Five hydroelectric dams on the Upper Missouri River are along the Great Falls reach, including on the three tallest waterfalls; and PPL's two other dams on that river are in canyons on the Stubbs Ferry stretch. These, together with two dams located in steep canyons on the Madison River, are called the Missouri–Madison project. The Thompson Falls project is a facility on the Clark Fork River. Both projects are licensed by the Federal Energy Regulatory Commission. PPL's facilities had existed for many decades, some for over a century, at the time of the dispute.

Montana was aware of the projects' existence but sought no rent for use of the riverbeds for most of that time. Instead, the understanding of PPL and the United States was that PPL had paid rents to the United States. In 2003, parents of Montana schoolchildren filed a federal suit, claiming that PPL's facilities were on riverbeds that were state-owned and part of Montana's school trust lands. The State joined the suit and, for the first time, sought rents from PPL for its use of the riverbeds. That case was dismissed, and PPL and other power companies filed a state-court suit, claiming that Montana was barred from seeking compensation for PPL's riverbed use. Montana counterclaimed, contending that under the equal-footing doctrine it owned the riverbeds and can charge rent for their use. The trial court granted Montana summary judgment as to navigability for purposes of determining riverbed title and ordered PPL to pay Montana $41 million in rent for riverbed use between 2000 and 2007. The Montana Supreme Court affirmed. Adopting a liberal construction of the navigability test, it discounted the Supreme Court's approach of considering the navigability of particular river segments for purposes of determining whether a State acquired title to the riverbeds underlying those segments at the time of statehood. Instead, the Montana court declared the river stretches in question to be short interruptions of navigability that were insufficient as a matter of law to find nonnavigability, since traffic had circumvented those stretches by portage. Based on evidence of present-day, recreational use of the Madison River, the court found that river navigable as a matter of law at the time of statehood.

== Opinion of the court ==
The Supreme Court issued an opinion on February 22, 2012. Citing cases including The Daniel Ball and United States v. Utah, the Supreme Court reminded the Montana Supreme Court that the equal-footing doctrine is based on whether the river segments were navigable at the time of statehood. Because the court determined that the Montana Supreme Court had incorrectly applied the test, it reversed and remanded on that basis without determining whether the river segments were navigable at the time of Montana's founding in 1889. The opinion by Justice Kennedy included extensive citations to historical documentation outside of the record that would have been researched by Supreme Court staff; for example, it cites multiple editions of the Journals of Lewis and Clark and nineteenth-century newspaper articles.
