= Astrue v. Capato =

- Supreme Court of the United States

Argued March 19, 2012 Decided May 21, 2012
- Full case name: Michael J. Astrue, Commissioner of Social Security, Petitioner v. Karen K. Capato, on Behalf of B. N. C., et al.
- Docket no.: 11-159
- Citations: 566 U.S. 541 (more) 132 S. Ct. 2021; 182 L. Ed. 2d 887; 2012 U.S. LEXIS 3782; 80 U.S.L.W. 4369

Case history
- Prior: Claim for benefits denied, unreported (ODAR, Nov. 28, 2007); affirmed, Capato v. Commissioner of Social Security, No. 2:08-cv-0540 5 (D.N.J. Mar. 23, 2010); reversed, 631 F.3d 626 (3d Cir. 2011); cert. granted, 565 U.S. 2011 (2011).

Holding
- The SSA's reading is better attuned to the statute's text and its design to benefit primarily those supported by the deceased wage earner in his or her lifetime. Moreover, even if the SSA's longstanding interpretation is not the only reasonable one, it is at least a permissible construction entitled to deference under Chevron U. S. A. Inc. v. Natural Resources Defense Council, Inc..

Court membership
- Chief Justice John Roberts Associate Justices Antonin Scalia · Anthony Kennedy; Clarence Thomas · Ruth Bader Ginsburg; Stephen Breyer · Samuel Alito; Sonia Sotomayor · Elena Kagan

Case opinion
- Majority: Ginsburg, joined by unanimous

Astrue v. Capato, 566 U.S. 541 (2012), was a case in which the Supreme Court of the United States held that children conceived after a parent's death are not entitled to Social Security Survivors benefits if the laws in the state that the parent's will was signed in forbid it. The case was a unanimous decision.

== Background ==
In 1999, Karen Capato's husband, Robert Capato, was diagnosed with esophageal cancer. Out of fear that he would become sterile due to the chemotherapy, Robert started to deposit sperm in a sperm bank in 2001. He began to recover and discovered that he was not left infertile by the cancer treatments. This led to the Capatos conceiving a son. Robert's condition started to worsen in 2002 and he died of cancer. Eighteen months after her husband's death, in 2003, Capato gave birth to twins. They were conceived after Robert's death using the sperm deposited in the sperm bank via in vitro fertilization. This was according to the Capatos' plan, so their son could have siblings. She applied for Social Security Survivors Benefits based on her husband's earnings during his lifetime. Her claim was rejected by the Social Security Administration (SSA).

== Litigation history ==
The administrative Judge for the Social Security Administration ruled that the place of death of Robert Capato was Florida. Under Florida law children can not inherit from a parent if they were conceived after that parent's death. The Social Security Administration has used state inheritance laws as the deciding factor if a person was a "child" under the Social Security Act and therefore eligible for survivors benefits since the 1940s. Capato appealed the Social Security Administration's decision and the case moved to the US Court of Appeals for the Third Circuit in Philadelphia, Pennsylvania. The appeals court reversed the Social Security Administration's decision.

== Before the Court ==
Are children conceived by in vitro fertilization after their biological father's death protected under Title II of the Social Security Act?

== Decision ==
In a unanimous 9–0 decision, Justice Ginsburg wrote the majority decision for the Supreme Court in favor of Astrue, stated that the children conceived after the death of their father were not entitled to Social Security benefits.

== See also ==
- List of United States Supreme Court cases, volume 566
