= Caraco Pharmaceutical Laboratories, Ltd. v. Novo Nordisk A/S =

- Supreme Court of the United States

Decided April 17, 2012
- Full case name: Caraco Pharmaceutical Laboratories, Ltd. v. Novo Nordisk A/S
- Citations: 566 U.S. 399 (more)

Holding
- A generic manufacturer may employ the counterclaim provision of the Hatch-Waxman Act to force correction of a use code that inaccurately describes the brand's patent as covering a particular method of using a drug.

Court membership
- Chief Justice John Roberts Associate Justices Antonin Scalia · Anthony Kennedy; Clarence Thomas · Ruth Bader Ginsburg; Stephen Breyer · Samuel Alito; Sonia Sotomayor · Elena Kagan

Case opinions
- Majority: Kagan, joined by unanimous
- Concurrence: Sotomayor

Laws applied
- Drug Price Competition and Patent Term Restoration Act of 1984

Caraco Pharmaceutical Laboratories, Ltd. v. Novo Nordisk A/S, 566 U.S. 399 (2012), was a United States Supreme Court case in which the court held that a generic manufacturer may employ the counterclaim provision of the Drug Price Competition and Patent Term Restoration Act of 1984 to force correction of a use code that inaccurately describes the brand's patent as covering a particular method of using a drug.
