= Florence v. Board of Chosen Freeholders =

- Supreme Court of the United States

Argued October 12, 2011 Decided April 2, 2012
- Full case name: Albert W. Florence v. Board of Chosen Freeholders of the County of Burlington, et al.
- Docket no.: 10-945
- Citations: 566 U.S. 318 (more) 132 S. Ct. 1510; 182 L. Ed. 2d 566
- Argument: Oral argument

Case history
- Prior: Judgment for plaintiff, 595 F. Supp. 2d 492 (D.N.J. 2009); Question certified for appeal, 657 F. Supp. 2d 504 (D.N.J. 2009); reversed, 621 F.3d 296 (3rd Cir. 2010); cert. granted, 563 U.S. 917 (2011).

Holding
- Officials may strip-search people who have been arrested for any crime before admitting the people to jail, even if there is no reason to suspect that the person is carrying contraband.

Court membership
- Chief Justice John Roberts Associate Justices Antonin Scalia · Anthony Kennedy; Clarence Thomas · Ruth Bader Ginsburg; Stephen Breyer · Samuel Alito; Sonia Sotomayor · Elena Kagan

Case opinions
- Majority: Kennedy, joined by Roberts, Scalia, Alito; Thomas (all but Part IV)
- Concurrence: Roberts
- Concurrence: Alito
- Dissent: Breyer, joined by Ginsburg, Sotomayor, Kagan

Laws applied
- U.S. Const amends. IV, XIV

Florence v. Board of Chosen Freeholders, 566 U.S. 318 (2012), was a United States Supreme Court case in which the court held that officials may strip-search people who have been arrested for any crime before admitting the people to jail, even if there is no reason to suspect that the person is carrying contraband.

== Background ==
Albert W. Florence was riding in a BMW sport-utility vehicle in New Jersey driven by his wife with their three children when she was pulled over for a traffic offense. The officer looked up Florence in the police computer database and discovered an outstanding warrant issued in Essex County. Florence had paid the fine, but the computer erroneously listed an outstanding warrant. Florence was placed under arrest in Burlington County and spent six days in jail before being transferred to Essex County's jail. At both jails, custody officers "conducted a visual inspection of his body, instructing him to open his mouth, lift his tongue, lift his arms, and then lift his genitals." Florence went before a judge and was quickly released from jail.

Florence filed suit against the two jails under 42 U.S.C. § 1983 alleging that his Fourth and Fourteenth Amendment rights had been violated. Florence, with Counsel of Record Susan Chana Lask, argued that "persons arrested for minor offenses cannot be subjected to invasive ... (Fourth Amendment-unreasonable searches) ... searches unless prison officials have ... (Fourteenth Amendment-Due Process Clause) ... reason to suspect concealment of weapons, drugs, or other contraband." A federal judge agreed. On appeal, the Third Circuit Court of Appeals reversed, holding that the "jails' interest in safety and security outweighed the privacy interests of detainees – even those accused of minor crimes." The case was subsequently appealed to the United States Supreme Court; the Court granted certiorari on April 4, 2011.

== Opinion of the court ==
In a 5–4 decision written by Justice Anthony Kennedy, the court held that officials may strip-search people who have been arrested for any crime before admitting the people to jail, even if there is no reason to suspect that the person is carrying contraband. Kennedy was joined by Chief Justice John Roberts and Justices Antonin Scalia, Samuel Alito, and Clarence Thomas. Justice Thomas joined all parts of Kennedy's opinion except part IV.

In his opinion, Kennedy noted that Timothy McVeigh was stopped by a state trooper after the Oklahoma City federal building bombing for driving without a license plate. And, one of the September 11 hijackers was "stopped and ticketed for speeding just two days before hijacking Flight 93," emphasizing the discrepancies that may exist between why a person is arrested and the kind of threat they pose to society.

Chief Justice Roberts and Justice Alito issued separate concurrences.

Justice Stephen Breyer dissented, joined by Justices Ruth Bader Ginsburg, Sonia Sotomayor, and Elena Kagan. In the dissent, they argued that empirical evidence on strip-searches suggests there is no convincing reason that, in the absence of reasonable suspicion, involuntary strip-searches of those arrested for minor offenses are necessary. They cited a study conducted in New York under the supervision of federal courts, where out of 23,000 people searched, only one inmate had hidden contraband in his body in a way that would have avoided detection by x-ray and a pat-down. A cited California study found only three instances out of 75,000 inmates strip-searched in a five-year period.

== Subsequent developments ==
The American Civil Liberties Union released a press statement saying that the decision "puts the privacy rights of millions of Americans at risk."

== See also ==
- List of United States Supreme Court cases, volume 566
- Fourth Amendment to the United States Constitution
- Fourteenth Amendment to the United States Constitution
- Search and seizure
- Strip search
