= Rehberg v. Paulk =

- Supreme Court of the United States

Decided April 2, 2012
- Full case name: Rehberg v. Paulk
- Citations: 566 U.S. 356 (more)

Holding
- A witness in a grand jury proceeding is entitled to the same absolute immunity from suit under Section 1983 as a witness who testifies at trial.

Court membership
- Chief Justice John Roberts Associate Justices Antonin Scalia · Anthony Kennedy; Clarence Thomas · Ruth Bader Ginsburg; Stephen Breyer · Samuel Alito; Sonia Sotomayor · Elena Kagan

Case opinion
- Majority: Alito, joined by unanimous

Rehberg v. Paulk, 566 U.S. 356 (2012), was a United States Supreme Court case in which the court held that a witness in a grand-jury proceeding is entitled to the same absolute immunity from suit under Section 1983 as a witness who testifies at trial.

== Background ==
Paulk, the chief investigator for a prosecutor's office, testified at grand-jury proceedings that resulted in petitioner’s indictment. After the indictments were dismissed, petitioner brought an action under 42 U. S. C. §1983, alleging that respondent had conspired to present and did present false testimony to the grand jury. The federal District Court denied Paulk's motion to dismiss on immunity grounds, but the Eleventh Circuit Court of Appeals reversed, holding that Paulk had absolute immunity from a Section 1983 claim based on his grand jury testimony.

== Opinion of the court ==
The Supreme Court issued an opinion on April 2, 2012.
