= Holder v. Gutierrez =

- Supreme Court of the United States

Decided May 21, 2012
- Full case name: Holder v. Gutierrez
- Citations: 566 U.S. 583 (more)

Holding
- The Board of Immigration Appeals's position that a non-citizen seeking cancellation of a deportation order must individually satisfy lawful permanent resident status requirements rather than relying on a parent's years of that status is based on a permissible construction of the statute.

Court membership
- Chief Justice John Roberts Associate Justices Antonin Scalia · Anthony Kennedy; Clarence Thomas · Ruth Bader Ginsburg; Stephen Breyer · Samuel Alito; Sonia Sotomayor · Elena Kagan

Case opinion
- Majority: Kagan, joined by unanimous

Holder v. Gutierrez (consolidated with Holder v. Sawyers), 566 U.S. 583 (2012), was a United States Supreme Court case in which the court held that the Board of Immigration Appeals's position that a non-citizen seeking cancellation of a deportation order must individually satisfy lawful permanent resident status requirements rather than relying on a parent's years of that status is based on a permissible construction of the statute.

== Background ==
Title 8 U. S. C. §1229b(a) authorizes the United States Attorney General to cancel the deportation ("removal") of a non-citizen from the United States who, among other things, has held the status of a lawful permanent resident (LPR) for at least five years, §1229b(a)(1), and has lived in the United States for at least seven continuous years after a lawful admission, §1229b(a)(2). These cases were about whether the Board of Immigration Appeals (BIA or Board) should impute a parent's years of continuous residence or LPR status to his or her child. That issue arises because a child may enter the country lawfully, or may gain LPR status, after one of his parents does—meaning that a parent may satisfy §1229b(a)(1) or §1229b(a)(2), while his child, considered independently, does not. In In re Escobar, 24 I. & N. Dec. 231, the BIA concluded that a non-citizen must meet §1229b(a)'s requirements on his own. But the Ninth Circuit Court of Appeals found the Board's position unreasonable, holding that §1229b(a)(1) and §1229b(a)(2) require imputation.

Martinez Gutierrez illegally entered the country with his family in 1989, when he was 5 years old. Martinez Gutierrez's father was lawfully admitted to the country two years later as an LPR. However, Martinez Gutierrez was neither lawfully admitted nor given LPR status until 2003. Two years after that, he was apprehended for smuggling undocumented people across the border. Admitting the offense, he sought cancellation of removal. The Immigration Judge concluded that Martinez Gutierrez qualified for relief because of his father's immigration history, even though Martinez Gutierrez could not satisfy §1229b(a)(1) or §1229b(a)(2) on his own. Relying on Escobar, the BIA reversed. The Ninth Circuit then granted Martinez Gutierrez's petition for review and remanded the case to the Board for reconsideration in light of its contrary decisions.

Sawyers was lawfully admitted as an LPR in October 1995, when he was 15 years old. At that time, his mother had already resided in the country for six consecutive years following a lawful entry. After Sawyers was convicted of a drug offense in August 2002, the Government began removal proceedings. The Immigration Judge found Sawyers ineligible for cancellation of removal because he could not satisfy §1229b(a)(2). The BIA affirmed, and Sawyers petitioned the Ninth Circuit for review. There, he argued that the Board should have counted his mother's years of residency while he was a minor toward §1229b(a)(2)'s 7-year continuous-residency requirement. The Court of Appeals granted the petition and remanded the case to the BIA.

== Opinion of the court ==
The Supreme Court issued an opinion on May 21, 2012.
