= Roberts v. Sea-Land Services, Inc. =

- Supreme Court of the United States

Decided March 20, 2012
- Full case name: Roberts v. Sea-Land Services, Inc.
- Citations: 566 U.S. 93 (more)

Holding
- An employee is "newly awarded compensation" when they first become disabled and thereby become statutorily entitled to benefits, no matter whether, or when, a compensation order issues on their behalf.

Court membership
- Chief Justice John Roberts Associate Justices Antonin Scalia · Anthony Kennedy; Clarence Thomas · Ruth Bader Ginsburg; Stephen Breyer · Samuel Alito; Sonia Sotomayor · Elena Kagan

Case opinions
- Majority: Sotomayor
- Concur/dissent: Ginsberg

Laws applied
- Longshore and Harbor Workers' Compensation Act

Roberts v. Sea-Land Services, Inc., 566 U.S. 93 (2012), was a United States Supreme Court case in which the court held that an employee is "newly awarded compensation" when they first become disabled and thereby become statutorily entitled to benefits, no matter whether, or when, a compensation order issues on their behalf.

== Background ==
The Longshore and Harbor Workers' Compensation Act (LHWCA) creates a comprehensive scheme to pay compensation for an eligible employee's disability or death resulting from injury occurring upon the navigable waters of the United States. Benefits for most types of disabilities are capped at twice the national average weekly wage for the fiscal year in which an injured employee is "newly awarded compensation." The LHWCA requires employers to pay benefits voluntarily, without formal administrative proceedings. Typically, employers pay benefits without contesting liability, so no compensation orders are issued. However, if an employer controverts liability, or an employee contests his employer's actions with respect to his benefits, the dispute proceeds to the Department of Labor's Office of Workers' Compensation Programs (OWCP) to be resolved, if possible, through informal procedures. An informal disposition may result in a compensation order. If not resolved informally, the dispute is referred to an administrative law judge (ALJ), who conducts a hearing and issues a compensation order.

In fiscal year 2002, Roberts was injured at an Alaska marine terminal while working for Sea-Land Services, Inc. (except for six weeks in 2003) voluntarily paid Roberts benefits until fiscal year 2005. Roberts then filed an LHWCA claim, and Sea-Land controverted. In fiscal year 2007, an ALJ awarded Roberts benefits at the fiscal year 2002 statutory maximum rate. Roberts sought reconsideration, contending that the award should have been set at the higher statutory maximum rate for fiscal year 2007, when, he argued, he was "newly awarded compensation" by order of the ALJ. The ALJ denied his motion, and the Department of Labor's Benefits Review Board affirmed, concluding that the pertinent maximum rate is determined by the date disability commences. The Ninth Circuit Court of Appeals affirmed.

== Opinion of the court ==
The Supreme Court issued an opinion on March 20, 2012. Judge Sotomayor announced the court’s opinion on the day of decision. It was stated that The Longshore and Harbor Workers’ Compensation Act capped benefits for majority of disabilities at twice the national average wage by week in the fiscal year where the newly-injured employee first receives their compensation, therefore making them entitled to these benefits no matter when the order is issued.
