= Mohamad v. Palestinian Authority =

- Supreme Court of the United States

Argued February 28, 2012 Decided April 18, 2012
- Full case name: Asid Mohamad, et al. v. Jibril Rajoub, et al.
- Docket no.: 11-88
- Citations: 566 U.S. 449 (more) 132 S. Ct. 1702
- Argument: Oral argument

Holding
- The Torture Victim Protection Act, 28 U.S.C. § 1350 note, does not permit actions against defendants who are not natural persons.

Court membership
- Chief Justice John Roberts Associate Justices Antonin Scalia · Anthony Kennedy; Clarence Thomas · Ruth Bader Ginsburg; Stephen Breyer · Samuel Alito; Sonia Sotomayor · Elena Kagan

Case opinion
- Majority: Sotomayor, joined by unanimous

Laws applied
- Torture Victim Protection Act of 1991

Mohamad v. Palestinian Authority, 566 U.S. 449 (2012) was a United States Supreme Court case in which the Court held the Torture Victim Protection Act of 1991 (TVPA), 28 U.S.C. § 1350 note, applies exclusively to natural persons and does not impose liability against any organizational entity.

== Background ==
In 1995, Azzam Rahim, a naturalized American citizen, was arrested by intelligence officers of the Palestinian Authority while visiting the West Bank. He was detained in a prison in Jericho, where he died two days later. His body was returned to his family, showing evidence of torture, including cigarette burns and broken bones. In 1996, the U.S. Department of State confirmed that Rahim had died while in the custody of Palestinian Authority intelligence officers.

== Procedural history ==
In 2005, Rahim's widow and children filed a lawsuit against the Palestinian Authority and the Palestinian Liberation Organization under the TVPA. The TVPA grants federal courts jurisdiction over lawsuits filed by foreign nationals for torts committed in violation of international law. It specifies that "an individual" can be held liable in a civil action for acts of torture or extrajudicial killing committed under the authority or color of the law of any foreign nation.

In September 2009, the United States District Court for the District of Columbia dismissed the suit, ruling that the TVPA applies exclusively to natural persons and does not extend liability to organizations.

The United States Court of Appeals for the District of Columbia Circuit affirmed the lower court's ruling in March 2011.

The U.S. Supreme Court granted the plaintiffs' petition for certiorari on October 17, 2011.

== Opinion of the Court ==
The Court unanimously held that, as used in the TVPA, the term "individual" encompassed only natural persons, and consequently, the TVPA did not impose liability against organizations. The Court affirmed the judgment of the lower courts.

The Court's decision hinged on the statute's use of the term "individual" as opposed to the term "person," which in U.S. law and statutes typically encompasses both individuals and organizations. The Court considered the term's ordinary meaning and the TVPA legislative history to interpret it. The court noted that the original draft of the TVPA used the word "person," however, during a U.S. House committee review, one of the bill's sponsors proposed an amendment to specify that the Act would apply solely to individuals, not corporations or organizations.

Justice Sotomayor delivered the Court's opinion, with Justice Scalia joining the majority opinion except for Part III-B. Justice Breyer filed a concurring opinion.

== Impact ==
Legal scholars criticized the decision, arguing that it creates significant obstacles for victims of torture seeking redress in U.S. courts. They contend that the ruling makes it nearly impossible for plaintiffs to recover damages unless they can identify the individual perpetrator and prove that the person acted as an agent of a government.
