= Greene v. Fisher =

- Supreme Court of the United States

Argued October 11, 2011 Decided November 8, 2011
- Full case name: Eric Greene, aka Jarmaine Q. Trice v. Jon Fisher, Superintendent, State Correctional Institution at Smithfield, et al.
- Docket no.: 10-637
- Citations: 565 U.S. 34 (more) 132 S. Ct. 38; 181 L. Ed. 2d 336; 2011 U.S. LEXIS 8077; 80 U.S.L.W. 4013
- Argument: Oral argument

Case history
- Prior: Petition denied, 482 F.Supp.2d 624 (E.D. Pa. 2007); aff'd, sub nom. Greene v. Palakovich, 606 F. 3d 85 (3d Cir. 2010)

Holding
- Under §2254(d)(1), "clearly established Federal law, as determined by the Supreme Court of the United States" does not include Supreme Court decisions that are announced after the last adjudication of the merits in state court but before the defendant's conviction becomes final.

Court membership
- Chief Justice John Roberts Associate Justices Antonin Scalia · Anthony Kennedy; Clarence Thomas · Ruth Bader Ginsburg; Stephen Breyer · Samuel Alito; Sonia Sotomayor · Elena Kagan

Case opinion
- Majority: Scalia, joined by unanimous

Laws applied
- 28 U.S.C. § 2254(d)(1) (Antiterrorism and Effective Death Penalty Act)

Greene v. Fisher, 565 U.S. 34 (2011), is a decision by the Supreme Court of the United States involving the Antiterrorism and Effective Death Penalty Act (AEDPA), which sets the standard of review for habeas corpus petitions brought in federal court to challenge state court convictions. AEDPA requires that to be set aside, the state court judgment must have been "contrary to, or involved an unreasonable application of, clearly established Federal law as determined by the Supreme Court of the United States."

In a unanimous opinion delivered by Justice Antonin Scalia, the Court ruled in Greene that "clearly established Federal law" under AEDPA does not include Supreme Court decisions that are announced after the last adjudication of the merits in state court but before the defendant's conviction becomes final.
