= Hall v. United States =

- Supreme Court of the United States

Decided May 14, 2012
- Full case name: Hall et ux. v. United States
- Citations: 566 U.S. 506 (more)

Holding
- The federal income tax liability resulting from a post-petition farm sale is not "incurred by the estate" under §503(b) of the Bankruptcy Code and thus is neither collectible nor dischargeable in a Chapter 12 bankruptcy plan.

Court membership
- Chief Justice John Roberts Associate Justices Antonin Scalia · Anthony Kennedy; Clarence Thomas · Ruth Bader Ginsburg; Stephen Breyer · Samuel Alito; Sonia Sotomayor · Elena Kagan

Case opinions
- Majority: Sotomayor, joined by Roberts, Scalia, Thomas, Alito
- Dissent: Breyer, joined by Kennedy, Ginsburg, Kagan

Laws applied
- Bankruptcy Code

Hall v. United States, 566 U.S. 506 (2012), was a United States Supreme Court case in which the court held that the federal income tax liability resulting from a post-petition farm sale is not "incurred by the estate" under §503(b) of the Bankruptcy Code and thus is neither collectible nor dischargeable in a Chapter 12 bankruptcy plan.

== Background ==
Chapter 12 of the Bankruptcy Code allows farmer debtors with regular annual income to adjust their debts subject to a reorganization plan. The plan must provide for full payment of priority claims. Under §1222(a)(2)(A), however, certain governmental claims arising from the disposition of farm assets are stripped of priority status and downgraded to general, unsecured claims that are dischargeable after less than full payment. That exception applies only to claims "entitled to priority under [11 U. S. C. §507]" in the first place. §507(a)(2) covers "administrative expenses allowed under §503(b)," which includes "any tax... incurred by the estate."

Lynwood and Brenda Hall filed for Chapter 12 bankruptcy and then sold their farm. They proposed a plan under which they would pay off outstanding liabilities with proceeds from the sale. The Internal Revenue Service (IRS) objected, asserting a tax on the capital gains from the sale. Petitioners then proposed treating the tax as an unsecured claim to be paid to the extent funds were available, with the unpaid balance being discharged. The Bankruptcy Court sustained an IRS objection, the federal District Court reversed, and the Ninth Circuit Court of Appeals reversed the District Court. The Ninth Circuit held that, because a Chapter 12 estate is not a separate taxable entity under the Internal Revenue Code (IRC), it does not "incur" post-petition federal income taxes. The Ninth Circuit concluded that, because the tax was not "incurred by the estate" under §503(b), it was not a priority claim eligible for the §1222(a)(2)(A) exception.

== Opinion of the court ==
The Supreme Court issued an opinion on May 14, 2012.
