= Missouri v. Frye =

- Supreme Court of the United States

Argued October 31, 2011 Decided March 21, 2012
- Full case name: Missouri v. Galin E. Frye
- Docket no.: 10-444
- Citations: 566 U.S. 134 (more) 132 S. Ct. 1399, 182 L. Ed. 2d 379 (2012).
- Argument: Oral argument
- Opinion announcement: Opinion announcement

Holding
- Defense counsel has the duty to communicate formal offers from the prosecution to accept a plea on terms and conditions that may be favorable to the accused.

Court membership
- Chief Justice John Roberts Associate Justices Antonin Scalia · Anthony Kennedy; Clarence Thomas · Ruth Bader Ginsburg; Stephen Breyer · Samuel Alito; Sonia Sotomayor · Elena Kagan

Case opinions
- Majority: Kennedy, joined by Ginsburg, Breyer, Sotomayor, Kagan
- Dissent: Scalia, joined by Roberts, Thomas, Alito

Laws applied
- U.S. Const. amends. VI, XIV

Missouri v. Galin E. Frye, 566 U.S. 134 (2012), was a case in which the United States Supreme Court ruled that attorneys of criminal defendants have the duty to communicate plea bargains offered to the accused.

== Background ==
In August 2007, Galin Frye was arrested and charged with driving without a license for the third time, making it a felony in Missouri. The prosecutor in the case sent Frye's attorney two plea offers; one to recommend a three-year sentence with Frye serving only ten days in jail if he pleaded guilty to the felony, and the second to reduce the felony to a misdemeanor, and Frye to serve 90 days in jail. Frye's attorney never notified him about the offers and they expired before being acted upon. Frye was arrested again for driving with a suspended license shortly before his preliminary hearing, after the offers had expired. He pleaded guilty to the new charge, and was sentenced to three years in prison.

Frye filed for postconviction relief, claiming that his attorney's failure to communicate the plea offers denied him of his right to effective counsel. At a preliminary hearing he testified that he would have pleaded guilty to the misdemeanor charge, had he known about the plea bargain offers. His appeal was denied by a state court, but the decision was reversed by the Missouri Court of Appeals.

== Arguments ==
The reversal was then appealed by the State of Missouri to the United States Supreme Court. In oral arguments, Missouri Attorney General Chris Koster argued that Frye's guilty plea was "voluntary, intelligent, and final" under Hill v. Lockhart and Premo v. Moore. He further argued that plea negotiations "are not a critical stage because ... the fate of the accused is not set", and as such the defendant is not necessarily entitled to counsel under the Sixth Amendment in this stage.

Emmett Queener, Frye's counsel, argued that "fundamental fairness and reliability of criminal process requires that an attorney provide his client information regarding matters in this case". He said that Frye's plea was "unknowing and involuntary" because he was not made aware of all options that were available, including the plea bargain that was offered.

== Ruling ==
The majority opinion, authored by Associate Justice Anthony Kennedy, ruled in favor of Frye. In the opinion announcement, Kennedy said that, while there is no right to a plea bargain, because "nearly 95% of convictions result from a plea bargain ... this Court is unwilling to say that within that system [of plea bargaining], counsel's performance does not matter". He noted that even if ineffective counsel is shown in this case, Frye would still need to show prejudice as set out in Strickland v. Washington to obtain relief:

[I]f Frye fails to show a reasonable probability the prosecutor would have adhered to the agreement, there is no Strickland prejudice...In this case, given Frye's new offense for driving without a license on December 30, 2007, there is reason to doubt that the prosecution would have adhered to the agreement or that the trial court would have accepted it ... unless they were required by state law to do so.

The Court held that "defense counsel has the duty to communicate formal offers from the prosecution to accept a plea on terms and conditions that may be favorable to the accused". The ruling of the Missouri Court of Appeals was vacated and the case was remanded.
