= Mississippi Law Journal =

- Discipline: Law
- Language: English
- Edited by: Cody Austin

Publication details
- History: 1928-present
- Publisher: University of Mississippi School of Law (United States)
- Frequency: Quarterly

Standard abbreviations
- Bluebook: Miss. L.J.
- ISO 4: Miss. Law J.

Indexing
- ISSN: 0026-6280
- OCLC no.: 1588099

Links
- Journal homepage

The Mississippi Law Journal is a law review published at the University of Mississippi School of Law. It was established in 1928 by the Mississippi Bar Association and is the state's longest running law review. Originally published with the subtitle Journal of the State Bar Association, the Mississippi Law Journal is now independently published and is funded and operated almost exclusively through the income of its case briefing service, which provides succinct synopses of the decisions of the Mississippi Supreme Court and Mississippi Court of Appeals.

== Fourth Amendment symposium ==
Each year since 2002, the National Center for Justice and the Rule of Law, located at the University of Mississippi School of Law, hosts an annual Fourth Amendment conference. As a part of this conference, the center invites some legal scholars to present papers on emerging issues in Fourth Amendment jurisprudence. The Mississippi Law Journal publishes these papers each year in its annual Fourth Amendment symposium issue. The journal also publishes an online companion called Supra, featuring short essays, responses to printed articles, and student case notes and comments.

== Membership ==
The Mississippi Law Journal accepts new members from the 2L class during the summer following their first-year of law school. All candidates for membership must have a 3.20 GPA and successfully complete a publication-quality case note, a Bluebook editing exercise, and an acceptable Mississippi case brief.

== Notable alumni ==
Past members Include:

- Haley Barbour (b. 1947), former Republican National Committee chairman and former Mississippi governor
- Rhesa Barksdale (b. 1944), United States Federal Court of Appeals Judge
- Thad Cochran (1937-2019), U.S. Senator
- Sam Davis, former Dean of the University of Mississippi School of Law
- Evelyn Gandy (1920-2007), attorney and politician, first woman to edit the journal
- Boyce Holleman (1924-2003), American war veteran, attorney, politician, and actor
- Robert Khayat (b. 1938), former Chancellor of the University of Mississippi
- Charles Willis Pickering Sr. (b. 1937), retired United States Federal Court of Appeals Judge
- Richard "Dickie" Scruggs (b. 1946), noted trial attorney
- Roger Wicker (b. 1951), current United States senator
- William F. Winter (1923-2020), former Mississippi Governor (1980–84)
