= One-stop career centers =

Public employment offices

One-stop career centers (or one-stop centers) are public employment offices in the United States. They are workforce information and education offices set up by Workforce Investment Boards as directed by the Workforce Investment Act of 1998. The Workforce Investment Act was repealed and replaced by the 2014 Workforce Innovation and Opportunity Act with an annual budget of $3.3 billion.

One-stop career centers are implemented in all US States under a variety of different local names. CareerOneStop is sponsored by the U.S. Department of Labor Employment and Training Administration and produced by the Minnesota Department of Employment and Economic Development. CareerOneStop is a partner of the American Job Center network.

== Types ==
Comprehensive One-Stop Career Centers – Provide a full array of employment and training related services for workers, youth and businesses. These locations include the mandatory Workforce Investment Act (WIA) partners on-site.

Affiliate One-Stop Career Centers – Provide limited employment and training related services for workers, youth, and businesses. These locations do not include all the mandatory Workforce Investment Act (WIA) partners (i.e., Veterans, Vocational Rehabilitation) on-site.

== Centers by states ==
- Alaska - Job Center
- California - America's Job Center of California (AJCC)
- Florida - CareerSource Florida
- Georgia - WorkSource Georgia
- Indiana - WorkOne
- Maryland - Maryland Workforce Exchange/American Job Center
- Massachusetts - MassHire Career Centers
- Michigan - Michigan Works!
- Mississippi - WIN Job Center
- North Carolina - NCWorks Career Centers
- Ohio - OhioMeansJobs
- Pennsylvania - PA CareerLink
- Texas - WorkInTexas
- Virginia - Virginia Career Works Fairfax
- Washington - WorkSource
- West Virginia - WorkForce WV
- Wyoming - Workforce Services/Center
