= Employment Standards Administration =

Former agency within the U.S. Department of Labor

The Employment Standards Administration (ESA) was the largest agency within the U.S. Department of Labor. Its four subagencies enforced and administered laws governing legally mandated wages and working conditions, including child labor, minimum wages, overtime pay, and family and medical leave; equal employment opportunity in businesses with federal contracts and subcontracts; workers' compensation for certain employees injured on their jobs; internal union democracy, financial integrity, and union elections, which protect the rights of union members; and other laws and regulations governing employment standards and practices.

It was created as the Wage and Labor Standards Administration in July 1967, and contained the Women's Bureau, Bureau of Labor Standards, Office of Federal Contract Compliance, Bureau of Employees' Compensation, and Employees' Compensation Appeals Board. In July 1969 the Wage and Hour Division became a part of it. In August 1970, it was renamed the Workplace Standards Administration, and in 1971, it was renamed the Employment Standards Administration. In May 1971, the Bureau of Labor Standards became the Occupational Safety and Health Administration and was moved outside ESA. in January 1978, the Women's Bureau became independent within the Department of Labor.

The ESA was eliminated on November 8, 2009. As of that date, ESA's four subagencies are now independent and report directly to the United States Secretary of Labor.

== See also ==
- Office of Federal Contract Compliance Programs
- Office of Labor-Management Standards
- Office of Workers' Compensation Programs
- Wage and Hour Division
