= Arnow =

Arnow is a surname. Notable people with the surname include:

- Harriette Simpson Arnow (1908–1986), American novelist
- Maxwell Arnow (1902–1984), American casting director
- Philip Arnow, American government official
- Winston Arnow (1911–1994), American judge

== See also ==
- Arlow
