= Al Angrisani =

Corporate Turnaround Executive, Politician

- Born: August 26, 1949; New Jersey, U.S.
- Died: April 23, 2020 (aged 70); Princeton Medical Center, Plainsboro, New Jersey, U.S.
- Occupations: author, business consultant, corporate executive
- Known for: Assistant U.S. Secretary of Labor for Employment and Training Administration
- Political party: Republican

Albert Angrisani (August 26, 1949 – April 23, 2020) was an American business consultant and the Assistant U.S. Secretary of Labor under President Ronald Reagan. As a result of his professional background in the public and private sector, he had been a regular commentator on several national news programs including CNBC, Fox Business News, and Bloomberg TV.

== Professional background ==
=== Chase Manhattan Bank ===
Angrisani was a Vice President of Chase Manhattan Bank in New York from 1972 to 1980. When he left Chase to begin his tenure with the Reagan Administration, he was head of Strategic Planning for the Investment, Trust and Private Banking businesses.

=== Assistant U.S. Secretary of Labor ===
Angrisani was the Assistant U.S. Secretary of Labor under President Ronald Reagan from 1980 to 1984. In this capacity, he was a senior policy advisor to President Reagan and played a significant role in the economic recovery plan that created 16 million new jobs.

He also was the author of the Job Training Partnership Act of 1982, which was one of the nation's first public & private partnerships and a major part of the president's job creation program.

=== Arthur D. Little's Strategy Consulting ===
Following his service with the Reagan Administration, Angrisani went on to hold executive positions with Arthur D. Little's Strategy Consulting business division, from 1985 to 1989.

=== Angrisani Turnarounds, LLC ===
In 1990, Angrisani started Angrisani Partners LLC, based in Princeton, New Jersey, which was an advisory and investment company that assisted troubled small-cap public companies restructure their business operations and balance sheets. After 1999, he expanded the business to include turnarounds of larger troubled public companies. In 2009, Angrisani changed the name of the company to Angrisani Turnarounds, LLC to reflect the company's focus on creating sustainable turnarounds and shareholder value creation. Major distressed companies in the firm's portfolio include:

- equity.
- Harris Interactive, Inc., an Internet marketing research company. In 2014 Angrisani completed, for the second time, an 18-month turnaround of Harris Interactive Corporation (NASDAQ: HPOL), with a sale to media giant Nielsen (NYSE: NLSN). Previously, in 2002–2004, Angrisani led a turnaround that increased shareholder value by more than $200 million over the two-year period.
- Greenfield Online/Ciao, the world's largest provider of global consumer attitudes about products and services. Prior to the second Harris deal, Angrisani engineered an enormously successful turnaround at Greenfield Online (formerly NASDAQ: SRVY), leading the sale of the company to the Microsoft Corporation (NASDAQ: MSFT) for $497 million on October 13, 2008.
- Total Research, where he was President and CEO from 1999 to 2002, and executed a turnaround and sale that resulted in a $100 million increase in its shareholder value.

=== TurnVest Partners, LLC ===
TurnVest Partners, is a private investment company focused on investing in public and private distressed companies, many of which are micro cap companies.

=== Author: From Last to First ===
In January 2018, Angrisani's second book, From Last to First: 10 Life-Changing Steps to Wealth and Success, was published by Humanix Books.

=== Win One for the $hareholders ===
In 2009, Angrisani wrote Win One for the $hareholders, presenting his background and professional knowledge as a turnaround executive and shareholder advocate. The book is a description of his model for corporate change and an exploration of current key economic issues.

Angrisani presents his views on why leading corporations in America have failed and how to restore their lost shareholder value. The book dissects some of the major problems in corporate America, likening them to the issues in a failing company.

The foreword of the book was written by John Kasich, Governor of Ohio. His foreword stated the following:

More than ever, America and its corporate sector need answers and someone to help them step back from the cliff—back onto solid ground. Now, more than ever, we need new leadership, a proven business model and a renewed set of values that we can trust and lean on.

— John Kasich

In March 2015 The Young Entrepreneur Council named the book one of 16 Entrepreneurial Books CEOs Swear By.

== Death ==
While undergoing treatment for advanced colon cancer, Angrisani contracted and died of COVID-19 during the COVID-19 pandemic in New Jersey.
