= Wyman Winston =

American municipal planner and politician

Wyman B. Winston (born 1952) is an American municipal planner and politician, serving as a member of the Cabinet of Wisconsin Governor Scott Walker was Executive Director of the Wisconsin Housing and Economic Development Authority (WHEDA) from January 2011 to January 2019.

== Background ==
Born and raised in the south side of Chicago, Illinois, Winston attended Chicago Vocational High School and the University of Illinois at Chicago where he received a Bachelor of Architecture in 1977. Winston worked in city planning in Chicago, and later as the Deputy Director of the Atlanta Development Authority and Deputy Director and COO of the Portland Development Commission. Winston moved to Wisconsin and spent 14 years at WHEDA as a Senior Manager, first in Multifamily and later heading the Emerging Markets Group. Wyman was a Senior Fellow at the American Leadership Forum from 2004-2005. He now resides in the Milwaukee southshore suburbs.

== Political career ==
Winston serves on the Governor's Task Force on Minority Unemployment and the Council on Workforce Investment. He is also President of the Greater Wisconsin Opportunities Fund, a Community Development Entity. In 2016, the Federal Reserve Bank of Chicago appointed Winston to a two-year term on its Advisory Council on Agriculture, Small Business and Labor.

While a cabinet appointee in a Republican-led administration, Winston has been a donor and supporter of a number of Democratic causes and candidates, including Congresswoman Gwen Moore and Wisconsin Senator Lena Taylor.
