= FECA =

FECA may refer to:

- Federal Election Campaign Act, a U.S. federal law regulating political campaign spending and fundraising.
- Federal Employees' Compensation Act, a U.S. national law regarding compensation to federal government employees for work-related injuries
- Family Entertainment and Copyright Act, a U.S. federal law pertaining to copyright
- FecA, the Fe(3+) dicitrate transport protein from E. coli
- First Eukaryotic Common Ancestor
