= Senior Community Service Employment Program =

The Senior Community Service Employment Program (SCSEP) is a program of the United States Department of Labor, its Employment and Training Administration, to help more senior citizens get back into or remain active in the labor workforce. It is a community service and work-based training program. It does this through job skill training and employment assistance with an emphasis on getting a ready job with a suitable and cooperating company or organisation. In such a setting, the worker is paid the United States minimum wage, or the highest of Federal, State or local minimum wage, or the prevailing wage, for an average of 20 hours per week, and experiences on-the-job learning and newly acquired skills use. The intention is that through these community jobs, the older worker will gain a permanent job, not subsidized by federal government funds.

People who are 55 or older can obtain job training and job search services from SCSEP. In each area of the country, SCSEP services are accessed through local organizations. These are usually nonprofits, but sometimes a state agency will administer the program.

== Eligibility guidelines ==
The participant must be at least 55 years of age and have a family income less than 125% of the Department of Health and Human Services' poverty level. There are certain exclusions in the income calculation, such as Social Security Disability Insurance (SSDI).

Enrollment priority is given to persons:

 who are 65 years of age or older;

 have a disability;

 have limited English proficiency;

 have low literacy skills;

 reside in a rural area;

 are veterans (or eligible spouses of veterans) for purposes of the Jobs for Veterans Act, Pub. L. No. 107-288 (38 USC 4215(a));

 have low employment prospects;

 have failed to find employment after using services provided under the Workforce Innovation and Opportunity Act (WIOA) of 2014 (Public Law 113-128);

 are homeless or at risk for homelessness; or

 are formerly incarcerated or on supervision from release from prison or jail within five years of the date of initial eligibility determination.

== History ==
SCSEP was authorized by the United States Congress in Title V of the Older Americans Act of 1965 and its later amendments to provide subsidized, part-time, community service work based training for low-income persons age 55 or older who have poor employment prospects. The program has evolved significantly in the last 50 years. The program is administered by nonprofit organizations and local government agencies.

== Controversy ==
Experience Works, Inc., was historically the largest provider of SCSEP services. In 2015, the grantee was cited for $1.6 million in questioned costs by the Department of Labor. The report details the use of unrestricted and accrued annual leave to cover a $1.6 million grant overspend, which $1.4 million was used to pay participant wages and fringe benefits, the misuse of federal funds to cover activities including first-class travel, pet hotels, fruit bouquets, personal loans to the CEO, and frequent credit card use on entertainment and prohibited lobbying. The number now totals approximately $2 million in questioned expenses. In 2016, the U.S. Department of Labor issued a follow-up report critical of current management for not taking any corrective actions to restore funds. As a result, the U.S. Department of Labor has revamped the funding for SCSEP and the Inspector General has expanded the investigation into the activities of the previous management. The federal investigation is aided by a whistleblower and other former employees. The whistleblower, later self-identified as Paul DelPonte, was granted federal protection and was appointed head of the National Crime Prevention Council in 2021. In September, 2016 the Inspector General issued a preliminary report describing the organization as financial insolvent and took steps to curtail and eliminate federal funding. Subsequently, more than 100 employees were terminated as a result of the funding reduction and were paid only part of their accrued leave. Experience Works was forced to cease operations in 2020.

== Funding ==
SCSEP has received stable funding of $434,371,000 during the last several years. The Trump administration has called for the elimination of the program, which is meeting some resistance in Congress.

The most recent budget proposal from the White House would eliminate the program entirely.

== See also ==
- Administration on Aging
