= Wagner–Peyser Act =

United States federal law (1933)

The Wagner–Peyser Act (Pub. L. 73–30) is a United States federal law that establishes a nationwide system of public employment offices, known as the Employment Service. The US DOL Employment and Training Administration defines the Employment Service (ES) as the national system of public offices described under the act, where services are delivered through a nationwide system of one-stop centers, managed by state workforce agencies (SWAs) and the various local offices of the SWAs, and funded by the US DOL.

The act was named for its congressional sponsors, Sen. Robert F. Wagner (D-New York) and Rep. Theodore A. Peyser (D-New York). As part of the New Deal, President Franklin D. Roosevelt signed the act into law on June 6, 1933, at the White House. The act was later amended many times, especially by the Workforce Investment Act of 1998 and the Workforce Innovation and Opportunity Act of 2014.

== See also ==
- National Industrial Recovery Act of 1933
