= Northern California Indian Development Council =

The Northern California Indian Development Council, Inc. (NCIDC) is a private nonprofit corporation that annually provides services to 14,000 to 15,000 clients statewide. NCIDC was established in 1976 with the following goals:

- To research, develop and administer social and economic development programs designed to meet the needs of Native American communities
- To provide support and technical assistance for the development of such programs
- The conservation and preservation of historic and archaeological sites and resources

In 1978, NCIDC became one of a very limited number of Community Services Administration Indian grantees located in Region IX. Although established as a Limited Purpose Agency, NCIDC functions in a similar capacity to a Community Action Agency, with the exception being the service population focus of American Indians.

The NCIDC administers a Workforce Investment Act (WIA) program, previously called the JTPA, which is available to provide quality employment and training services to assist eligible individuals in finding and qualifying for meaningful employment, and to help employers find skilled workers.
