= Workforce Investment Board =

Workforce Investment Boards (or "WIBs") were regional entities created to implement the Workforce Investment Act of 1998 in the United States, the Federated States of Micronesia, the Republic of Palau and the Republic of the Marshall Islands. The implementing law was replaced by the Workforce Innovation and Opportunity Act in 2014.

== Overview ==
Every community in the fifty states, the District of Columbia, Puerto Rico, the United States Virgin Islands, Guam, American Samoa, Northern Mariana Islands, Federated States of Micronesia, Republic of the Marshall Islands, and Republic of Palau, was associated with a Local WIB (LWIB). For each LWIB, a chief elected official (for example, a county commissioner or the mayor of a lead city) appointed members to sit on the WIB. These appointed positions were unpaid. At least 50% of a WIB's membership was required to come from private businesses. There were also designated seats for representatives from labor unions and educational institutions like community colleges as well. Beyond these basic guidelines, many aspects of how an individual WIB operated could vary.

== Purpose ==
The WIB's main role was to direct federal, state and local funding to workforce development programs. WIBs conducted and published research on these programs and the needs of their regional economy. They also oversaw the One-Stop Career Centers, where job seekers could get employment information, find out about career development training opportunities and connect to various programs in their area. One-Stop Career Centers also provided many no-cost services to employers. Services varied by state and WIB.

WIBs worked in conjunction with economic development related organizations to minimize the reaction time and create resources to intervene for both the dislocated workforce and the incumbent workforce members of a community.

== See also ==
- Labor market area
