= Daredevil: Chinatown =

- Publisher: Marvel Comics
- Publication date: December 2015 – March 2016
- Genre: Superhero
- Title(s): Daredevil: Back in Black, Chinatown vol. 5, #1-#5
- Main character(s): Daredevil; Foggy Nelson; The Hand

Creative team
- Writer: Charles Soule
- Artist: Ron Garney
- Penciller: Ron Garney
- Inker: Matt Milla
- Letterer: Clayton Cowles & Joe Caramagna
- Colorist: Matt Milla
- Editor: Axel Alonso

"Daredevil: Chinatown" is a five-issue Daredevil story arc under the All-New, All-Different Marvel title' which was Written by Charles Soule, with art by Ron Garney. This series was collected in late 2015 and ended mid 2016. The story is split into 5 issues detailing Daredevil's return to New York in a new mostly black costume after he had erased the knowledge of his secret identity from everyone on the planet and taking in a new apprentice named Samuel Chung who takes on the identity Blindspot, and their fight against a new enemy called Tenfingers, all taking place at Chinatown.

== Plot summary ==
The first issue starts with Daredevil in a new black costume and back on his home turf in New York as Matt Murdock begins a fresh life once again putting San Francisco behind him even though he's returned to New York City, Matt's on a different side of the law now, with a job in the District Attorney's office. He starts off by saving a man named Billy Li from being thrown in the Hudson River fighting off common thugs who are more skilled fighters than they let on, but fortunately he has help from a new partner named Blindspot (aka Samuel Chung); Matt as Daredevil came across him as Chinese immigrant who lives with his little sister and struggles to get by in the City while at the same time does his best to look after his family; Samuel managed to invent an invisibility suit' and secretly decides to use it to fight all the crime going on in Chinatown to protect his friends and family.

Down the line he comes across Daredevil who decides to take him under his wing as his new sidekick; Matt as Daredevil teaches Samuel how to fight, use stealth to his advantage and travel through rooftop without revealing his true identity to Samuel but still keeping him in the loop.

After defeating the thugs, Daredevil gives more advice and tells him to meet up with him again and they part ways after, while Daredevil secretly takes Billy Li while he's unconscious and goes to Franklin "Foggy" Nelson's apartment at night to recuperate and let Billy rest; while he's there he and Foggy argue about the situation going with Matt hiding out at his place from time to time and that Foggy doesn't feel comfortable at all knowing that Matt and Daredevil are one and the same again after Matt managed to make it so that everyone else forgot about his secret identity and only told Foggy again because he trusts him.

Even so, Foggy doesn't want the pressure of having to deal with taking on the responsibility again, he also asks Matt about his new partner Blindspot and why's he's trusting him too. Matt assures him it's because feels Blindspot needs his help and guidance with his suit and how to be a crimefighter, and that he's sure he can be trusted too. Foggy understands but tries to tell Matt that tonight is the last time he helps him, while rushes off through the window, leaving Billy in his hands, knowing Foggy will help him out when he wakes up.

Next morning down at Hogan Place, county district attorney's office, at Manhattan. Matt as the new ADA gets visited by a woman named Ellen King who discusses with him about a grand jury witness who also happens to be Billy Li; revealing that Matt didn't save him at random he also saved him as Daredevil because he's an important witness in an ongoing case; despite the fact Billy's a snitch and a low-level street thug who goes by "Bigmouth Li" with charges stacked against him; and has requested Matt as the prosecuting attorney to help him.

It's also revealed that the case involves a man named Tenfingers, a cultist leader with his own Chinese-styled church called the Church Of The Sheltering Hands, within New York's Chinatown' who has been linked to organized crime within the chinatown community, and Billy has information on one of his lieutenants that can help put Tenfingers away. Making a deal with the authorities, Billy promises to give information on the lieutenant in exchange for freedom.

Meanwhile, back in Chinatown, one of the men who was in the group who tried to go after Billy, managed to return to Tenfingers lair without getting caught by Daredevil and Blindspot, and meets up with Tenfingers himself. He's then revealed to be a Chinese man with long hair in a pony tail in a traditional Chinese garb, with ten fingers on both his hands, which is why the call him Tenfingers in the first place.

Tenfingers sits before him with his followers, and reprimands him for his failure, and says "of course I'm sure you did your best. such a shame, too. I was prepared to take 2 fingers from you, if had succeeded." The enforcer begs Tenfingers to give him another chance; even offering to cut off two of his fingers for him, showing that he already lost one to Tenfingers. But then two of Tenfingers men with metallic hands; one of them being named "Onehand" take his hand planning to do more than that at Tenfingers command. At the same time they ask Tenfingers what should they do about Billy now, and Tenfingers tells them to kill him at the courthouse, while he also tells the man standing behind him to kill Matt Murdock too, and the man standing behind him is none other than Samuel himself! But he's not actually working for Tenfingers because he wants to, he's only doing it' to find out more about Tenfingers, and how to stop him.

The next day, Matt' whose down at New York State Supreme Court building in Foley Square, discusses the case about Tenfingers with the legal team. While at the same time back in Chinatown, Tenfingers talks to his followers; full of Chinese immigrants at the church of the sheltering hands about being shut down by the New York City courts. Matt talks about how Tenfingers has been luring undocumented Chinese immigrants with promises of hope and salvation for their lives; while at the same time taking advantage of their trust and using them to commit crimes for him, taking control of rival gangs, with extortion and killings while at the same time using congregation funds to build his operations. While Tenfingers promises his followers that their church will survive governments assaults, having them pray with him.

Next day at the Downtown Manhattan courthouse, two Tenfingers men led by Samuel' enter the building via rooftop' while Matt is there busy with working on upcoming hearing with Ellen King. Together Samuel break into the Detention Level of the building where they hold the defendants. Knock two guards and make their way to Billy Li; while Matt finishes with Ellen King on the prep work for the hearing. As they go down to the room holding Billy, they enter finding Billy alive and well' but seeing that he had been attacked with two fingers cut off from his right hand, and three fingers cut off from his left hand!

Meanwhile, back at Chinatown at the church, Tenfingers questions Samuel about what went wrong and why he didn't kill Billy Li and Matt Murdock. Samuel convinces him that killing them both at courthouse would have drawn too much attention to Tenfingers and the church; which Tenfingers understands and so do his main elite team which he calls the "Eights" standing next to them, who are two Chinese women and a bald man dressed up formal combat gear and each have eight fingers! on both their hands! just like Tenfingers himself has ten fingers on both his hands; Tenfingers reveals this is because of the power he gave to them as a reward for their loyalty and trust.

Tenfingers states that Samuel's mother gave him this opportunity, revealing that the first woman of the eights is none other his mother who also happens to be Tenfingers lover as well!

The night after; Samuel changes into Blindspot again and goes on the rooftops to find Daredevil in the spot he told him, so they can do some training, while Daredevil is frustrated and thinking to himself about Billy Li getting his fingers cut off, and how he could have stopped it' if he hadn't allowed himself to be distracted!

During training with Blindspot he rips out the transistor on his suit giving invisibility, demonstrating on how to fight and telling him that he can't just rely on his suit alone for protection in battle and needs to use his mind to help him adapt. But Blindspot can sense his frustration and asks what's wrong, but Daredevil doesn't tell him much to protect his secret; despite that Blindspot tells him his own problems with Tenfingers and how he's messing up Chinatown, hurting people he knows, doing terrible things and that he became Blindspot so he could do something about it and stop him!

Daredevil realizes that he's right and not been doing a good job being a mentor to him; at the same moment' Blindspot tells Daredevil that Tenfingers has special powers, and anyone working for and proves themselves to him will be rewarded with power themselves making them stronger in the process. Daredevil realizes this is the reason why the thugs he encountered later in the week could fight like professional martial artists and why Tenfingers managed to build up his own church so quickly.

Blindspot also tells him that he plans on going down to the church right now and finally take down Tenfingers. Daredevil understands and joins to help him. When they make their way across and break into the church unnoticed; they see Tenfingers magically giving power to 2 more of his men Onehand and Nonefingers. Daredevil soon realizes the source of his power and immediately jumps in and tells Tenfingers to stop! while also telling him he knows how he got his powers and warns him that the people he stole it from will be hunting him down to take it back!

At that moment, Onehand and Nonefingers are both shot in the chest with arrows by none other than The Hand!, who say they will take back what was stolen from them!

Daredevil tries telling Tenfingers to get his people out and run; but Tenfingers assures him that his subjects can handle it. He orders his elite guards The Eights to fight The Hand ninjas, while Daredevil reluctantly decides to stay and fight; not for Tenfingers sake' but to make sure no one gets killed in the fighting, along with Blindspot joining in the battle too. During the fight, one of the ninjas tells Daredevil that Tenfingers was one of them, but then betrayed them; and says The Hand will kill anyone who stands with him.

The situation quickly explodes into a massive brawl between The Hand, Tenfingers men, plus Daredevil & Blindspot. But then The Hand decide to retreat and pull away in smoke pellets' with Tenfingers telling his followers that everything's alright now, and also telling Daredevil that he knew there was no real danger, his people protected him because they trust Tenfingers as he promised to protect them in return. Daredevil tries warning Tenfingers people otherwise and that The Hand doesn't give up, but they don't believe him' while Tenfingers tells him to believe what he wants, and that he forgives his doubt. After that Daredevil and Blindspot simply decide to leave.

Later that night, Daredevil meets up with Blindspot again on a rooftop explaining about The Hand, and how Tenfingers must've got his powers from them. He also notices that Blindspot got hurt in the fight; he gives him the number to Linda Carter, one of the Night Nurses for superheroes.

The next morning, Matt goes in to see superior Mr. Hochberg at The Manhattan District Attorney's office, he explains to Matt about his disappointment in his actions on the case against Tenfingers' with Matt failing to produce any real evidence to indict him and shut down his church, and how he failed to protect Billy Li from getting attacked by Tenfingers men. He also told Matt that until further developments' he'll have to have Matt assigned to ECAB night court cases instead; and dismissed him.

Matt ponders about how things have spun out of control, and how he's supposed to be Daredevil while now being assigned to working night cases at the same time. At that moment Ellen King walks by and tells Matt she's been looking for him and leads him to his next client - who turns out to be none other than Tenfingers himself!

Together they sit down at Matt's table shake hands while Tenfingers introduces himself and tells Matt about clearing up a misunderstanding, with Matt thinking he's "some sort of villain".

During their meeting, Tenfingers asks Matt if he's a man of faith; Matt replies he used to be. Tenfingers tells him he's seems to be focused only on himself, and also tells Matt he himself was once the same. Matt counters asking if he really thinks he's helping the people of Chinatown, when all he's really doing is giving false hope and promises; taking advantage of their trust, and generosity. Tenfingers says what he promises is real and he'll save everyone in Chinatown; he goes on saying that he used to be part of a warrior cult that did exchange with Demons for special powers, doing terrible things during his time with them. But despite his past he believes in redemption; saying he had vision that by founding his church he would save anyone in need who believed in him; and he would save them return, providing them with salvation and miracles. He told Matt he stole as much power as he could from the people he worked with and came to America to save lives. Telling Matt of the quote' John 11:26 from the Bible, he compares his church teachings to the Christians beliefs, saying they're similar; and yet Matt and the courts he upholds are trying to shut him down. Matt responds it's because he's not a God, to which Tenfingers counters "How the Hell do you know what I am".

Tenfingers sits up and tells Matt he's glad they talked and that if he needs spiritual guidance' he's welcome to come to his church, saying that he and his followers would love to have him there. But also tells Matt that he will not let anything get in the way of his helping the people of Chinatown; saying Matt should think about that before he reopens the case against him.

Tenfingers leaves telling Matt that he's at the bottom of a pit thanks to the legal system; while Tenfingers himself is working on a higher level thanks to his church and beliefs. Going to say that his church will save people; and the more followers he has' the more people he saves, it's that simple, and everything's he's done so far' even things other people would consider questionable are in service of the people, saying "I know this to be true. I have seen it. I am a Hero Mr. Murdock. A Savior. You are a faithless, mean little man doing everything he can to stop me. If I am God... I wonder... What does that make you?

Later that night, Matt changes to Daredevil, and busts some bombamker terrorists in a building in Red Hook, Brooklyn thanks to a tip given to him by Steve Rogers formerly Captain America, who had been changed into his proper age of an old man due to the effects of his Super-Soldier serum wearing off at the time forcing him to retire as a Superhero. Despite that, he still watches over the old local neighborhood for any signs of trouble; letting other Superheroes know if there's any danger so they can help out when he can't. But tonight Daredevil called him to keep an eye out for any other danger and also ask him for advice about his problem with Tenfingers and his church in Chinatown, communicating to each other through radio.

While fighting the terrorists Daredevil recaps how he got his powers, and the training he went through to use them along with his skills to make a difference in the world by helping people, and that he saw anyone getting in the way of that was like going against God. Questioning if he and Tenfingers were any different. While at the same time Daredevil tells Steve about his new partner Blindspot without revealing his or Blindspot's true names. At the same time in Chinatown Blindspot under true identity Samuel Chung entering the Church of The Sheltering Hands and seeing that Tenfingers disciples are collecting more money from the people who follow him. Sam asks were his mom is and one of the Monks shows him to the main hall were the chamber room is' telling him she's in there, Sam goes in to see her kissing Tenfingers. Once they see him, She & Tenfingers are surprised not expecting him, and Sam asks to speak to him in private as he has something to tell him.

While back in Red Hook; Daredevil goes down the hallway in the building he's chasing the terrorists. Knowing he's about to get them the terrorists abandon the room their in with their equipment' but plant a bomb to go off in less than a minute which will kill everyone in the area once it goes off. While back at the church Sam confronts his mom about her being at the church trying to convince her that Tenfingers can't be trusted, and that he's heard about The Hand; insisting that she and the other follower are being used, but she protests that everything that she and the followers are doing is for the good of the people at Tenfingers command. While telling Sam that she's disappointed that he hasn't fully committed to the church and Tenfingers teachings, and showing Sam her eight fingers saying Tenfingers gave her that power so she could help him to help the followers and anyone else.

Sam goes against her saying that she's mad at him because he wouldn't kill Billy Li for Tenfingers and the church, questioning why a church would want people killing each other. Sam's mom says that he's become too Americanized and selfish, saying everything the church is about is to protect the people of Chinatown and watching out for them when no one else will. Sam argues they have Blindspot to help them; but she says that Blindspot is a no one working with Daredevil to bring down the church; calling Blindspot an enemy and that Tenfingers will get rid of him soon enough, also saying she hopes Tenfingers asks her to do it.

Finally having had heard enough Sam puts his invisibility mask and activates it behind her back, and at the same time reveals his identity as Blindspot to her giving her the chance to do it.

While back at Red Hook, Daredevil is working on how to defuse the bomb with the help of Steve Rogers through radio. Since Daredevil can't see the numbers on the countdown timer he asks Steve to help without revealing his identity to him, since Daredevil doesn't have enough time to figure out which wire to cut to stop the countdown, he goes out the window and grabs one of the terrorists who are trying to escape by helicopter on the next building rooftop with the grappling hook from his billy club, and drags him back to room with the bomb to force him to defuse the bomb or he'll let kill them both with 9 seconds remaining.

While at the same time back at the church Sam now as Blindspot still confronting his mom is prepared to fight if he has to; And his mom looks on infuriated that her own son is the one trying to bring down the church. Angry she simply knocks off the mask from her son's face taking away his invisibility; Sam's responds "That's alright mom. I don't want to see you anymore either".

Meanwhile, back at Red Hook, Daredevil's threat against the terrorist worked and he defused the bomb just in time. He and the other terrorists gave themselves up and were turned in to the authorities. As they left, Daredevil and Steve looked on in a job well done' with Steve asking him why he called him in the first place when he didn't need help. Daredevil wanted to tell him his true identity again, but decided not to and simply stated that "Just... reassurance, maybe. That when you look back, on all the choices you made... the things you gave up, the things you lost... even the people you may have hurt along the way... that it was worth it".

Steve responds "I don't know the answer to that. Not for you. I live my life, you live yours. Just look in the mirror every day. If you can't see yourself in the man looking back... that's when you might have a problem.

While back at the church, Sam explains to his mom that he wanted to show her who is and that they don't have to listen to Tenfingers; Sam says he wants her to come back to him and their family life saying they can help the people of Chinatown together. While also saying that The Hand is coming for Tenfingers and anyone who stands with him, saying it's just a matter of time. And at that moment a zombie-like Hand Ninja with a chain-hook on his left arm appears inside the center of the church ready to attack everyone.

Samuel and his mother Lu Wei watch as the Ninja starts attacking, while Tenfingers joins Samuel and Lu Wei up on the balcony watching with them and says The Hand sent a mystical creature called The Fist "A half-dead beast infused with evil energies through the art of The Hand, come to kill me and everyone else here. It is the great ending. A walking death. The cataclysm of which I was warned. It is my destiny."

While at the same time The Fist goes about attacking trying to kill everyone. Tenfingers men try to stop Him but start getting overpowered with little defense; while all the followers try to escape, they are unable to as Tenfingers tells Lu Wei that he has sealed the Temple doors so no one can get out as he says "all must bear witness" and shows Lu Wei a secret chamber that reveals an armory of guns just in case of emergencies. While at the same time' Samuel takes out his smartphone and posts a message on Twitter before he puts his mask back on to go down and fight the Fist and save everyone as best he can.

Meanwhile' at the New York County District Attorney's office. Matt is working when he hears "Daredevil The Temple" from a nearby woman's smartphone' because she follows Blindspot on Twitter where he has a dozen internet followers supporting him. Matt realizes Samuel sent a message on the Twitter account for his Blindspot identity, knowing it would spread and reach him sooner or later. Realizing something's wrong at the Temple, he asks his assistant to cover for him, while he goes to secretly change into Daredevil and head down to the Temple to join the fight.

Back at the Temple, Tenfingers arms himself with custom made ten pistol guns made just for him and shoots at the Fist; but soon gets overpowered and thrown into a pile with his men. Just before the Fist can get to him; Tenfingers transfers a portion of his power to some of his followers to use as a distraction for the Fist to go after instead of him. But before The Fist can kill them; Daredevil stops him with a grappling hook from his billy club and tells everyone to run.

While he drops down to fight it, Daredevil recounts to himself he's heard of Creatures called Fists in The Hands ranks; they can be summoned when The Hand has to sacrifice a 100 of their own to do so, which is why they never do it often. Daredevil doesn't know if he can kill it or if it can be killed but he knows he has to try. While fighting The Fist he confronts Tenfingers at the same time. Tenfingers men soon come to his aide while Tenfingers panics and orders his men to kill the followers while he runs for it to save himself.

While at the same time Daredevil keeps The Fists attention on him so Blindspot can get the followers to safety. Blindspot leads the followers to an underground bunker where he hopes they'll be safe from The Fist. Before he can go help Daredevil; Lu Wei and the rest of Tenfingers men try to get past him to kill the followers at Tenfingers command. But Blindspot refuses, ready to fight them if he has to; while Daredevil battles The Fist, Blindspot fights his mother and Tenfingers forces. Meanwhile Tenfingers tries to pack up his things and escape to start anew somewhere else; but before he can' a mysterious voice startles him and takes him by surprise. Back at the center of the Temple Daredevil continues battling The Fist, and knowing it's not really alive' doesn't hold back and straggles it to death. After that Daredevil rushes to Tenfingers room to stop him from escaping, but finds Tenfingers murdered and his body gruesomely repositioned to look like a Hand. Showing that another agent of The Hand had gotten to him and killed him just in case The Fist failed.

While back at the bunker' Blindspot with a damaged suit and invisibility gone, tries to keep Lu Wei and Tenfingers men from killing the followers despite his injuries. At that moment Lu Wei has a change of heart and kills Tenfingers men with swords behind their backs, saving Samuel. Samuel asks why' and she simply responds "Because I believed you. Next time I might not. Your mother is dead Samuel. Don't ever try to save me again". After that she soon departs.

The whole ordeal ends when cops and ambulances arrive to clear up the situation and help the followers who got hurt; while Daredevil & Blindspot stand on rooftop looking down and reminiscing about everything that just happened. Daredevil thinks about Blindspot telling him how he defended the followers from Tenfingers forces, but also knows from his powers that Blindspot left out the part about his mother Lu Wei getting away and him letting her go. Daredevil understands given his own history and decides not to bother him about it. Blindspot asks Daredevil "What now then? Are we done?", Daredevil responds "Done? My friend, there's no such thing. You think this is the last time Chinatown will need your help? No. This job doesn't end. That's the best thing about it". The End.

== Reception ==
The storyline of "Chinatown" received positive reviews from critics.
