= Mai Lee Chang =

American AI Researcher

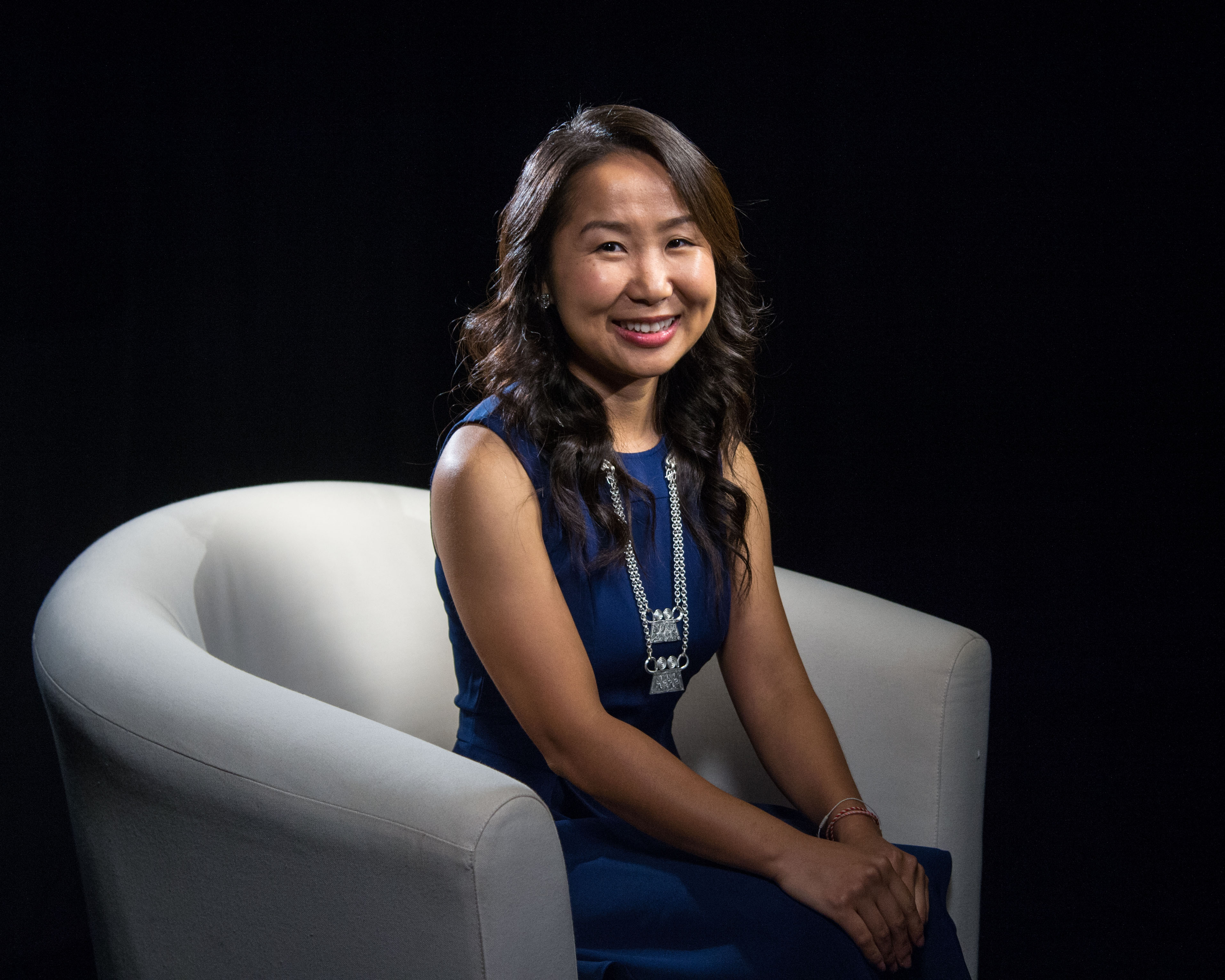
- Born: Thailand
- Education: University of Texas-Austin
- Known for: AI and robotics research, NASA engineer
- Website: https://www.maileechang.com/

Mai Lee Chang is a research scientist in the areas of AI, robotics, and user experience. Dr. Chang's expertise is in human-AI collaboration, with a focus on creating effective partnerships between people and intelligent systems. Her work encompasses a range of AI technologies including robots, conversational agents, and other embodied AI. Her research integrates methods from machine learning, behavioral science, and design inquiry to develop AI technologies that are capable of assimilating into human environments, gaining user acceptance, and being perceived as trustworthy and valuable.

== Early life ==
Mai Lee Chang was born the older of four in Thailand in the Ban Vinai Refugee Camp. Her family were refugees of the Vietnam War and settled in the United States in Fresno, California in 1992. Chang received her high school diploma from Oshkosh North High School. She received her Bachelor's in Engineering Mechanics and Astronautics with a certificate in International Engineering and a Master's in Industrial and Systems Engineering, from the University of Wisconsin-Madison. Chang earned her Ph.D. at the University of Texas at Austin in Electrical and Computer Engineering under Andrea Thomaz with a dissertation titled Optimizing for task performance and fairness in human-robot teams in 2022.

== Career and publications ==
In 2012, Chang began working as a Human Factors & Systems Engineer at NASA Johnson Space Center in the Human Systems Engineering & Development Division. She was a part of the International Space Station (ISS) Flight Crew Integration team and the Orion Human Engineering team for designing the Orion spacecraft. She conducted and developed technology in the fields of human-robot interaction and human-automation interaction. She is currently a postdoctoral fellow in Human-Computer Interaction Institute at Carnegie Mellon University with Dr. John Zimmerman and Dr. Jodi Forlizzi. Her current research is a part of the AI Institute for Collaborative Assistance and Responsive Interaction for Networked Groups (AI-Caring), a National Artificial Intelligence (AI) Research Institute funded by the National Science Foundation.

=== Publications ===
- Chang, M.L, Reig, S., Lee, A. Simao, H., Khanuja, N., Zimmerman, J., Forlizzi, J. & Steinfeld A. (2023). "Understanding Boundaries of Agent Intervention for Adults With and WIthout Mild Cognitive Impairment." Proceedings of the 2023 CHI Conference on Human Factors in Computing Systems Workshop on The Future of Hybrid Care and Wellbeing in HCI.
- Claure, H., Chang, M.L., Kim, S., Omeiza, D., Brandão, M., Lee, M.K., Jung, M. (2022) "Fairness and Transparency in Human-Robot Interaction"
- Lawson, Wallace; Harrison, Anthony; Change, Mai Lee; Adams, William; Trafton, J. Gregory. 2022 "Salient Keypoints for Interactive Meta-Learning (SKIML)", 31st IEEE International Conference.
- Chang, M. L., Trafton, G., McCurry, J. M., & Thomaz, A. L. (2021). "Unfair! Perceptions of Fairness in Human-Robot Teams." In 2021 30th IEEE International Conference on Robot & Human Interactive Communication (RO-MAN) (pp. 905–912).
- Chang, M. L., & Thomaz, A. (2021). "Valuable Robotic Teammates: Algorithms That Reason About the Multiple Dimensions of Human-Robot Teamwork." In Companion of the 2021 ACM/IEEE International Conference on Human-Robot Interaction (pp. 580–582).
