= United States Employment Service =

Employment Service (ES)
- United States Employment Service
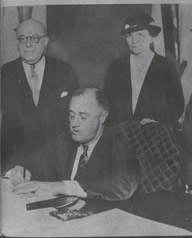
- Frances Perkins looks on as Franklin D. Roosevelt signs the Wagner-Peyser Act creating the US Employment Service. June 6, 1933
- Ministry: Employment and Training Administration
- Launched: June 6, 1933; 93 years ago
- Website: dol.gov/agencies/eta

The US Employment Service (ES) is the national system of public employment offices, managed by state workforce agencies and their localities, and funded by the Department of Labor. It is supervised by the Employment and Training Administration and was established by the Wagner–Peyser Act of 1933.

== Services ==
Although the Employment Service is only one of 19 required partners in the Workforce Innovation and Opportunity Act (WIOA) One-Stop delivery system, its central mission—to facilitate the match between individuals seeking work and employers seeking workers—makes it critical to the functioning of the workforce development system under WIOA. To this end, one of the key functions played by the ES is to deliver many of the "career services" established by WIOA. ES staff often are the first to assist individuals seeking employment assistance and refer individuals to other programs in the One-Stop system of partners.

Services provided by the ES include:

- Labor exchange services (e.g., counseling, job search and placement assistance, labor market information)
- Program evaluation
- Recruitment and technical services for employers
- Work tests for the state unemployment compensation system, and
- Referral of unemployment insurance claimants to other federal workforce development resources

Labor exchange services are provided via three tiers of service delivery:

- Self-service—typically electronic databases of job openings
- Facilitated self-help—access to self-service tools, e.g., computers, resume-writing software, fax machines, photocopiers, and Internet-based tools
- Staff-assisted service—
  - One-on-one services for job seekers often include assessment, career counseling, development of an individual service plan, and intensive job search assistance
  - Group services for job seekers include orientation, job clubs, and workshops on such topics as resume preparation, job search strategies, and interviewing

== History ==
In around 1890, both the United States and European governments created government-funded employment offices to provide work for unemployed unskilled laborers. These services proved to be unsuccessful.

The 1st USES was established as the Division of Information in the Bureau of Immigration and Naturalization, Department of Commerce and Labor, by the Immigration Act of 1907, to distribute immigrants throughout the United States. It was transferred with the Bureau of Immigration and Naturalization to the DOL by the Department of Labor Act (37 Stat. 737), March 4, 1913, and made part of separate Bureau of Immigration. Designated USES, ca. 1915, and functioned as a general placement agency. Made an autonomous unit within DOL by department order, January 3, 1918.

In 1933 during the Great Depression, with the Wagner-Peyser Act, the 2nd USES was reinstated “to set minimum standards, develop uniform administrative and statistical procedures, publish employment information, and promote a system of "clearing labor" between states.” Then President Franklin D. Roosevelt had created many government-funded work projects to help boost the economy and the USES was responsible for hiring the workers on those projects. The USES operated originally in only a few states but by World War II, it was operating in all states and played a major role in providing jobs during the war. In the United States home front during World War II, the service coordinated employment of prisoners of war (e.g., using German POWs at Gettysburg for local pulpwood cutting).

Like many labor organizations of its time, the USES officially stated a belief in racial equality in the workplace, yet it provided fewer jobs for its African American workers. Historian Eric Arnesen from the University of Illinois argues that, “although the agency stated its general opposition to racial discrimination, it referred very few African Americans to jobs in war industries, defense training courses, or youth work-defense projects. In fact, the central administration encouraged its branches, especially in the South, to oblige employer preferences by accommodating racial discrimination.” In the Bureau of Agricultural Economics instructional manual for the USES during wartime from the 1940s, it reads that the USES policy was, “to make all referrals without regard to race, color, creed, or national origin except when an employer’s order includes these specifications which the employer is not willing to eliminate,” and if the employer had no racial preferences “but community custom or past hiring practices of the employer indicate that he may refuse to hire individuals of a particular race, color, creed, or national origin, the employment office interviewer shall ascertain whether or not he has any restrictive specifications.”

The 2d USES was transferred to SSB in newly created FSA by Reorganization Plan No. I of 1939, effective July 1, 1939, and consolidated with Bureau of Unemployment Compensation to form BES (SEE 183.2). It was transferred from BES to War Manpower Commission (WMC) in the Office for Emergency Management by EO 9247, September 17, 1942. USES headquarters functions were absorbed by Bureau of Placement, WMC, with Employment Office Service Division administering local USES offices. WMC was terminated by EO 9617, September 19, 1945, and USES transferred to DOL as autonomous bureau. USES was restored to BES by act of June 16, 1948 (62 Stat. 443). It was transferred with BES to DOL by Reorganization Plan No. 2 of 1949, effective August 20, 1949. It was assigned as part of BES to Manpower Administration by Secretary's Order 3-63, February 19, 1963. It was abolished with BES, effective March 17, 1969, by Secretary's Order 14-69, March 14, 1969. USES' Veterans Employment Service and Farm Labor and Rural Manpower Service reconstituted as part of USTES, Manpower Administration.

USTES was abolished by Manpower Administration order, December 12, 1971. USTES' employment service components were reconstituted in Manpower Administration as the 3d USES, with the status of an autonomous programmatic unit. Retained autonomous status in ETA, successor, by Secretary's Order 14-75, November 12, 1975, to Manpower Administration. It was assigned, with UIS and OTAA, to newly established OES, ETA, 1982.

== See also ==
- Workforce Innovation and Opportunity Act (H.R. 803; 113th Congress)
- Employment and Training Administration
