= Benefits Review Board =

Agency overview
- Formed: 1972
- Jurisdiction: Federal government of the United States
- Headquarters: Washington, D.C.
- Employees: 1,000
- Agency executive: Judith Boggs, Chairman and Chief Administrative Appeals Judge
- Website: www.dol.gov/brb

The Department of Labor's Benefits Review Board was created in 1972, by the United States Congress, to review and issue decisions on appeals of workers’ compensation claims arising under the Longshore and Harbor Workers’ Compensation Act and the Black Lung Benefits amendments to the Federal Coal Mine Health and Safety Act of 1969.

== Operation ==
The Board, by statute, consists of five Members appointed by the Secretary of Labor, one of whom is designated as Chairman and Chief Administrative Appeals Judge. The Board's mission is to issue decisions on the appeals pending before it with expediency, consistency and impartiality, in accordance with its statutory standard of review and applicable law. The Board exercises the appellate review authority formerly exercised by the United States District Courts. Board decisions may be appealed to the U.S. Courts of Appeals and to the U.S. Supreme Court.

== See also ==
- Title 20 of the Code of Federal Regulations
