= Veterans' Employment and Training Service =

US government employment program

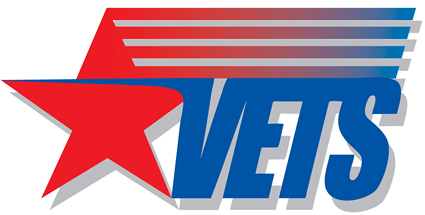

Agency overview
- Formed: December 1981
- Jurisdiction: Federal government of the United States
- Headquarters: Washington, D.C.
- Employees: 233 (180 field staff, 53 headquarters)
- Agency executive: James Rodriguez, Assistant Secretary
- Website: www.dol.gov/agencies/vets

The United States Office of the Assistant Secretary for Veterans' Employment and Training (OASVET) was established by Secretary's Order No. 5-81 in December 1981.

The assistant secretary position was created by P.L. 96-466 in October 1980, to replace the Deputy Assistant Secretary for Veterans' Employment position created by P.L. 94-502 in October 1976. The bipartisan Congressional intent was to establish leadership of the department's programs for services to veterans at the policy-making level, and thereby help to ensure Congressional mandates for an effective:

- Job and job training counseling service program,
- Employment placement service program, and
- Job training placement service program for eligible veterans (carried out by the United States Department of Labor).

On July 16, 2021, President Joe Biden nominated James Rodriguez, the acting agency head and assistant secretary's principal deputy, for the position of Assistant Secretary for VETS; he was confirmed by the Senate and sworn into office in May 2022.

== Corruption scandal ==
On 22 July 2011, the then assistant secretary, Ray Jefferson, was led out of the Frances Perkins Building by the FBI and subsequently resigned on July 25, 2011, following a contracting scandal.

== See also ==
- Title 20 of the Code of Federal Regulations
