= Title 20 of the Code of Federal Regulations =

U.S. federal rules and regulations on employees' benefits

CFR Title 20 – Employees' Benefits is one of 50 titles composing the United States Code of Federal Regulations (CFR) and contains the principal set of rules and regulations issued by federal agencies regarding employees' benefits. It is available in digital and printed form and can be referenced online using the Electronic Code of Federal Regulations (e-CFR).

== Structure ==
The table of contents, as reflected in the e-CFR updated March 4, 2014, is as follows:

Volume	Chapter	Parts	Regulatory Entity
1	I	1-199	Office of Workers' Compensation Programs, Department of Labor
	II	200-399	Railroad Retirement Board
2	III	400-499	Social Security Administration
3	IV	500-599	Employees' Compensation Appeals Board, Department of Labor
	V	600-656	Employment and Training Administration, Department of Labor
4	V	657-699	Employment and Training Administration, Department of Labor
	VI	700-799	Office of Workers' Compensation Programs, Department of Labor
	VII	800-899	Benefits Review Board, Department of Labor
	VIII	900-999	Joint Board for the Enrollment of Actuaries
	IX	1000-1099	Office of the Assistant Secretary for Veterans' Employment and Training Service, Department of Labor
