= Ray Jefferson =

American government official (1966–2024)

Raymond M. Jefferson III
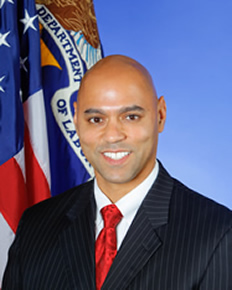

Assistant Secretary of Labor for Veterans' Employment and Training
- In office 2009–2011
- President: Barack Obama

Personal details
- Born: June 13, 1966; Albany, New York
- Died: October 13, 2024 (aged 58)
- Education: United States Military Academy (BS); Harvard University (MPA, MBA)

Military service
- Branch/service: United States Army
- Unit: 3rd Ranger Battalion; 1st Special Forces Group

Raymond M. Jefferson III (June 13, 1966 – October 13, 2024) was an American government official and military officer who was assistant secretary of labor for the Veterans' Employment and Training Service. He graduated from the United States Military Academy and served in the United States Army. During a training session as an Army officer with Special Forces, he lost all of his fingers on his left hand while attempting to protect his teammates from a defective hand grenade that was detonating prematurely.

In 2009, he was appointed to his position at the United States Department of Labor. He resigned in 2011 after an Inspector General's report concluded he had violated federal procurement rules. In 2019, the Inspector General reversed its ruling, stating that the claims were unsubstantiated. From 2011 until his death in 2024, he worked as the sole proprietor of a global leadership consultancy company.

== Early life and education ==
Jefferson's father was a corporate director and his mother worked at Macy's. He was raised in Albany, New York and graduated from the United States Military Academy in 1988 with a Bachelor of Science degree in psychology. Jefferson earned a Master of Public Administration degree in strategic management from the Kennedy School of Government, graduating with distinction as a Littauer Fellow. He also earned an MBA from Harvard Business School and received the Dean's Award for exceptional leadership and service.

== Career ==
Jefferson was an army officer with the infantry and Special Forces, as well as the Presidential Honor Guard, 3rd Ranger Battalion and 1st Special Forces Group. In 1999, he lost all five fingers on his left hand while attempting to protect his teammates from a hand grenade detonating prematurely during Special Forces training. He recuperated from his injuries at the Tripler Army Medical Center in Hawaii.

Jefferson was a White House Fellow from 2000 to 2001 as a special assistant to the United States secretary of commerce and the under secretary of state for management. He was then a Fulbright Fellow in Singapore studying leadership within Asian contexts.

In January 2003, Jefferson was appointed deputy director of Hawaii Department of Business, Economic Development and Tourism. In July 2003, he was awarded the Harrison H. Schmitt Leadership Award for dedication to public service. He also worked in Singapore as a leadership consultant at McKinsey & Company, developing leadership training and development programs for his clients.

In 2009, Jefferson was appointed by President Obama as assistant secretary for the Veterans' Employment and Training Service (VETS) of the United States Department of Labor.

Jefferson resigned from his position as assistant secretary on July 25, 2011, following accusations that he had violated federal procurement rules. An Inspector General's report alleged that two whistleblowers had reported that Jefferson directed VETS employees to award contracts to the management consultant Stewart Liff at a higher cost than could have been procured in an open selection process. On September 26, 2019, the inspector general reversed a predecessor's finding, stating that the accusations could not be substantiated. The government also agreed to pay some of Jefferson's legal fees.

Jefferson was the sole proprietor of Jefferson Group, a global leadership consultancy based in Singapore.

In March 2022, Jefferson was nominated by President Joe Biden as under secretary of veterans affairs for benefits. However, his nomination was withdrawn on July 11, 2022, after stalling in committee over Republicans' objections.

In 2022, Jefferson was appointed by President Joe Biden as a Member of the President’s Commission on White House Fellowships.
