= Maxwell Arnow =

American film producer

Maxwell Arnow (February 25, 1902 in New York City – June 6, 1984 in Beverly Hills) was an American casting director. He was known for his discoveries of future film stars Humphrey Bogart and Katharine Hepburn.

Maxwell Arnow was born in New York City on November 25, 1902, the son of Jacob and Pauline Cohen Arnowitz. He married Henrietta Schnall in 1929 in New York. In 1932, he moved his family to California and was hired by Warner Bros., becoming one of the youngest casting directors in Hollywood at the time. While at Warner, he auditioned an Illinois sportscaster known as Dutch Reagan. After offering him a contract, Max insisted that Reagan use his given first name Ronald.

After leaving Warner Bros. in 1938, he worked for David O. Selznick and was the casting director for Gone with the Wind and other films. Arnow took also an important role in the "Searching for Scarlett" for the casting of Gone with the Wind. He joined Columbia Pictures in 1942 and remained there until 1956. Then he joined the new company formed by Harold Hecht and Burt Lancaster. He developed diabetes in his later years and lost his eyesight as a result.

Other film stars he worked with included Kay Francis, Miriam Hopkins, Helen Hayes, Ruth Chatterton, Ronald Reagan, Kim Novak, Jack Lemmon, Ernest Borgnine, Shelley Winters, Robert Vaughn, Mary Maguire and Tab Hunter.
