= Workforce Innovation and Opportunity Act =

American public law pertaining to workforce development

- Long title: To reform and strengthen the workforce investment system of the Nation to put Americans back to work and make the United States more competitive in the 21st century.
- Announced in: the 113th United States Congress
- Sponsored by: Rep. Virginia Foxx (R-NC)

Citations
- Public law: Pub. L. 113–128 (text) (PDF)

Codification
- Acts affected: Workforce Investment Act of 1998, Rehabilitation Act of 1973, Wagner-Peyser Act, Food and Nutrition Act of 2008, Immigration and Nationality Act, and others.
- Authorizations of appropriations: $3.3 billion for fiscal year 2017

Legislative history
- Introduced in the House as H.R. 803 by Rep. Virginia Foxx (R-NC) on February 25, 2013; Passed the House on March 15, 2013 (Roll Call Vote 75: 215-202); Passed the Senate as the Workforce Innovation and Opportunity Act on June 25, 2014 (Roll Call Vote 214: 95-3) with amendment; House agreed to Senate amendment on July 9, 2014 (Roll Call Vote 378: 415-6); Signed into law by President Barack Obama on July 22, 2014

The Workforce Innovation and Opportunity Act (WIOA) is a United States public law that replaced the previous Workforce Investment Act of 1998 (WIA) as the primary federal workforce development legislation to bring about increased coordination among federal workforce development and related programs.

== The One-Stop Delivery System ==
WIOA continues the requirements of WIA for each state to establish a One-Stop delivery system to

- provide "career services" and access to "training" services;
- provide access to programs and activities carried out by One-Stop partners; and
- provide access to all workforce and labor market information, job search, placement, recruitment, and labor exchange services.

Required Partners in One-Stop Centers
Program	Federal dept.
Youth Workforce Investment Activities	Labor
Adult Employment and Training Activities	Labor
Dislocated Worker Employment and Training Activities	Labor
Job Corps	Labor
Native American Programs	Labor
Migrant and Seasonal Farmworker Programs	Labor
YouthBuild Program	Labor
Employment Service	Labor
Adult Education and Literacy Activities	Education
Vocational Rehabilitation State Grant Programs	Education
Senior Community Service Employment Program	Labor
Postsecondary Career and Technical Education	Education
Trade Adjustment Assistance	Labor
Jobs for Veterans State Grant programs	Labor
Employment and Training Activities carried out under the Community Services Block Grant	HHS
Employment and Training Activities carried out by the Department of Housing and Urban Development	HUD
State Unemployment Compensation programs	Labor
Reintegration of Offenders Programs	Justice
Temporary Assistance for Needy Families (TANF)	HHS

Optional Partners in One-Stop Centers
Programs	Federal agency
Employment and training programs, e.g., Ticket to Work	Social Security Administration
Employment and training programs	Small Business Administration
Any employment and training activities required of recipients under the Supplemental Nutrition Assistance Program (SNAP, formerly known as the Food Stamp program), and work programs for those recipients who are able-bodied adults without dependents	
Client Assistance Program authorized under section 112 of the Rehabilitation Act of 1973	
Programs authorized under the National and Community Service Act of 1990, e.g., AmeriCorps	

=== Employment Service ===
Although the Employment Service (ES) is one of 19 required partners in the One-Stop delivery system, its central mission—to facilitate the match between individuals seeking work and employers seeking workers—makes it critical to the functioning of the workforce development system under WIOA. To this end, one of the key functions played by the ES is to deliver many of the "career services" established by WIOA. ES staff often are the first to assist individuals seeking employment assistance and refer individuals to other programs in the One-Stop system of partners.

Services provided by the ES include:

- Labor exchange services (e.g., counseling, job search and placement assistance, labor market information)
- Program evaluation
- Recruitment and technical services for employers
- Work tests for the state unemployment compensation system, and
- Referral of unemployment insurance claimants to other federal workforce development resources

Labor exchange services are provided via three tiers of service delivery:

- Self-service—typically electronic databases of job openings
- Facilitated self-help—access to self-service tools, e.g., computers, resume-writing software, fax machines, photocopiers, and Internet-based tools
- Staff-assisted service—
  - One-on-one services for job seekers often include assessment, career counseling, development of an individual service plan, and intensive job search assistance
  - Group services for job seekers include orientation, job clubs, and workshops on such topics as resume preparation, job search strategies, and interviewing

== Provisions ==
WIOA includes five titles:

- Title I—Workforce Development Activities—authorizes job training and related services to unemployed or underemployed individuals and establishes the governance and performance accountability system for WIOA;
- Title II authorizes adult education, integrated education and training, and workforce preparation services that enable adults to gain skills, earn credentials, and transition into employment and postsecondary education;
- Title III—Amendments to the Wagner-Peyser Act—amends the Wagner-Peyser Act of 1933 to integrate the U.S. Employment Service (ES) into the One-Stop system authorized by WIOA;
- Title IV—Amendments to the Rehabilitation Act of 1973—authorizes employment-related vocational rehabilitation services to individuals with disabilities, to integrate vocational rehabilitation into the One-Stop system; and
- Title V—General Provisions—specifies transition provisions from WIA to WIOA.

=== Title I ===
Title I of WIOA authorizes programs to provide job search, education, and training activities for individuals seeking to gain or improve their employment prospects, and which establishes the One-Stop delivery system. In addition, Title I of WIOA establishes the governing structure and the performance accountability for all programs authorized under WIOA. Title I programs are administered by the US Department of Labor (DOL), primarily through its Employment and Training Administration (ETA).

Elements of WIOA that are collectively intended to comprise a "workforce development system" are:

- WIOA is designed to be a demand driven workforce development system. This system is supposed to provide employment and training services that are responsive to the demands of local area employers. The demand driven nature of WIOA is manifested in elements such as Workforce Development Boards (WDBs), a majority of whose members must be representatives of business, and in the requirement for local plans to identify existing and emerging in-demand industry sectors and occupations.
- WIOA emphasizes coordination and alignment of workforce development services, through provisions such as a required Unified State Plan for core programs and a common set of performance indicators across most programs authorized by WIOA. In addition, WIOA requires regional planning across local areas.
- WIOA provides local control to officials administering programs under it. Under the state formula grant portion of WIOA, which accounts for nearly 60% of total WIOA Title I funding, the majority of funds are allocated to local WDBs (after initial allotment from ETA to the states) that are authorized to determine the mix of service provision, eligible providers, and types of training programs, among other decisions.
- The WIOA system provides central points of service through its system of One-Stop centers. The concept of a One-Stop center is to provide a single location for individuals seeking employment and training services, thus making the process of locating and accessing employment services more efficient and seamless. WIOA requires certain programs to be "partners" in the One-Stop center, either by physical colocation or other accessible arrangements. Notably, WIOA requires the colocation of Employment Service offices with One-Stop centers.
- WIOA provides universal access to its career services to any individual regardless of age or employment status, but it also provides priority of service for career and training services to low-income and skills-deficient individuals.
- WIOA emphasizes sector partnerships and career pathways workforce development strategies by requiring local WDBs to lead efforts to develop career pathways strategies and to implement industry/sector partnerships with employers.
- WIOA provides consumer choice to participants. Eligible participants are provided with Individual Training Accounts (ITAs), with which they may choose a type of training and the particular provider from which to receive training.
- WIOA implements a performance accountability system based on primary indicators with state-adjusted levels of performance resulting from negotiations between each state and the Secretary of Labor and revised based on a statistical adjustment model. The performance accountability system applies across all titles of WIOA.

=== Title II ===
Title II of WIOA is the Adult Education and Family Literacy Act (AEFLA). AEFLA supports educational services, primarily through grants to states, to help adults become literate in English and develop other basic skills necessary for employment and postsecondary education, and to become full partners in the education of their children.

=== Title III ===
Title III amends the Wagner-Peyser Act of 1933, which authorizes the Employment Service (ES), to make the ES an integral part of the One-Stop system amended by WIOA.

=== Title IV ===
Title IV of WIOA amends the Rehabilitation Act of 1973 and authorizes funding for vocational rehabilitation services for individuals with disabilities. Most programs under the Rehabilitation Act are related to the employment and independent living of individuals with disabilities.

== History ==
=== Background ===
The first substantial federal training programs in the postwar period were enacted in the Manpower Development Training Act (MDTA; Pub. L. 87–415) in 1962, although federal "employment policy," broadly defined, had its origin in New Deal era programs such as Unemployment Insurance (UI) and public works employment. Starting with MDTA, there have been four main federal workforce development programs. The MDTA provided federal funding to retrain workers displaced because of technological change. Later in MDTA's existence, the majority of funding went to classroom and on-the-job training (OJT) that was targeted to low-income individuals and welfare recipients. Funding from the MDTA was allocated by formula to local communities based on factors of population and poverty. Grants under MDTA were administered through regional DOL offices and went directly to local service providers.

The Comprehensive Employment and Training Act (CETA), enacted in 1973, made substantial changes to federal workforce development programs. CETA transferred more decision-making authority from the federal government to local governments. Specifically, CETA provided funding to about 470 "prime sponsors" (sub-state political entities such as city or county governments, consortia of governments, etc.) to administer and monitor job training activities. Services under CETA—which included on-the-job training, classroom training, and public service employment (PSE)—were targeted to low-income populations, welfare recipients, and disadvantaged youth. At its peak in 1978, the PSE component of CETA supported about 755,000 jobs and accounted for nearly 60% of the CETA budget. CETA was amended in 1978 in part to create private industry councils (PIC) to expand the role of the private sector in developing, implementing, and evaluating CETA programs. The composition of PICs included representatives of business, labor, education, and other groups.

In 1982, changes to federal workforce development policy were made by enactment of the Job Training Partnership Act (JTPA). Major changes implemented under JTPA, which provided classroom and on-the-job training to low-income and dislocated workers, included service delivery at the level of 640 "service delivery areas," federal funding allocation first to state governors and then to PICs in each of the service delivery areas (unlike CETA, which provided allocations directly to prime sponsors), prohibition of the public service employment component, and a new emphasis on targeted job training and reemployment. With a new emphasis on training (rather than public employment), JTPA required that at least 70% of funding for service delivery areas be used for training. Although this percentage was dropped to 50% in the 1992 amendments to JTPA, the emphasis on training remained.

The Workforce Investment Act of 1998 (WIA) replaced JTPA and continued the trend toward service coordination by establishing the One-Stop system through which state and local WIA training and employment activities were provided and in which certain partner programs were required to be colocated. WIA replaced PICs with Workforce Investment Boards (WIBs), which were responsible for the design of services for WIA participants. In addition to these changes, WIA enacted changes that included universal access to services (i.e., available to any individual regardless of age or employment status), a demand driven workforce system responsive to the demands of local area employers (e.g., the requirement that a majority of WIB members must be representatives of business), a work-first approach to workforce development (i.e., placement in employment was the first goal of the services provided under Title I of WIA as embodied in the "sequence of services" provisions), and the establishment of consumer choice for participants who were provided with Individual Training Accounts (ITAs) to choose a type of training and the particular provider from which to receive training.

=== Procedural history ===
The Supporting Knowledge and Investing in Lifelong Skills Act (SKILLS Act) was introduced into the United States House of Representatives on February 25, 2013 by Rep. Virginia Foxx (R-NC). It was referred to six House committees: Agriculture, Education and the Workforce, Energy and Commerce, Judiciary, Transportation and Infrastructure, and Veterans Affairs. It was reported (amended) on March 12, 2013 alongside House Report 113-14 part 1. On March 15, 2013, the House voted in Roll Call Vote 75 to pass the bill 215-202.

The bill was received in the Senate on March 18, 2013 and referred to the Health, Education, Labor and Pensions committee. On June 25, 2014, the Senate changed the name of the bill to the Workforce Innovation and Opportunity Act, amended the bill, and then voted in Roll Call Vote 214 to pass the bill 95-3. Before the bill's passage in the Senate, the House and the Senate spent several months debating compromise positions to find a bill they could agree on. The House then voted on July 9, 2014 to agree to the amendments that the Senate had made. The amended bill passed the House 415-6 in Roll Call Vote 378.

President Barack Obama supported the bill. He signed it into law on July 22, 2014 and it became Pub. L. 113–128 (text) (PDF).

The Departments of Labor and Education issued draft regulations on how to carry out the law on April 16, 2015, considered thousands of comments, and issued the final regulations June 30, 2016, effective October 18, 2016.

=== Debate and discussion ===
Senator Lamar Alexander (R-TN) said that "it's too hard to find a job. It's too hard to create a job. We have some differences of opinion on what to do about it, but I think we agree that matching job skills to a job is a solution to millions of Americans."

Senator Jack Reed (D-RI) said that "the need to improve our workforce investment system has crystalized during the Great Recession... employers say they have open positions they cannot fill because they cannot find workers with the skills they need today."

The original bill that the House passed focuses mostly on getting rid of redundant workforce programs, as identified by the Government Accountability Office, while the Senate's earlier drafts kept all of the redundant programs and added additional ones.

The bill was supported by the National Skills Coalition.

The group Business Roundtable also supported the bill, arguing that the legislation "will narrow the skills gap and prepare American workers for the jobs of today and tomorrow."

=== Amendments ===
In 2015, the bill was amended by the act entitled "To amend the Workforce Innovation and Opportunity Act to improve the Act" (Pub. L. 114–18 (text) (PDF)).

== Funding, costs, and expenditures ==
This article incorporates public domain material from CBO - H.R. 803, as ordered reported by the House Committee on Education and the Workforce on March 6, 2013. Congressional Budget Office.

WIOA would consolidate job training programs under the Workforce Investment Act of 1998 (WIA) into a single funding stream. It also would amend the Wagner-Peyser Act, reauthorize adult-education programs, and reauthorize programs under the Rehabilitation Act of 1973 (RA). Those programs, which received discretionary funding of $7 billion and mandatory funding of $3 billion in 2013, provide job training, adult education, and employment service assistance. Enactment would affect direct spending, but those costs are already assumed to continue in the Congressional Budget Office's (CBO) baseline; therefore, pay-as-you-go procedures do not apply. (Enacting the bill would not affect revenues.) Implementing the act would affect discretionary spending. Assuming appropriation of the authorized amounts, CBO estimates that implementing H.R. 803 would cost $26 billion over the 2014-2018 period. WIOA would not impose intergovernmental or private-sector mandates as defined in the Unfunded Mandates Reform Act (UMRA).

The vast majority of funds (97%) for Employment Service activities are allotted to states on the basis of each state's relative share of the following two factors: civilian labor force (CLF) and total unemployment. Specifically, two-thirds of the ES state funding is allotted on the basis of the relative share of CLF and one-third on the basis of the relative share of total unemployment. The remaining 3% of total funding is distributed to states with civilian labor forces below 1 million and to states that need additional resources to carry out ES activities. Of the total allotment to states, 90% may be used for labor exchange services such as job search and placement assistance, labor market information, and referral to employers. The remaining 10% (Governor's Reserve) of the state allotment may be used for activities such as performance incentives and services for groups with special needs.

== See also ==
- List of bills in the 113th United States Congress
- Unemployment in the United States
- Economy of the United States
