= Employment and Training Administration =

US government agency, part of the Department of Labor

Employment and Training Administration (ETA)

Agency overview
- Formed: 1975
- Jurisdiction: Federal government of the United States
- Headquarters: Washington, D.C.
- Employees: 1,000
- Agency executive: Lori Frazier Bearden, Acting Assistant Secretary of Labor for Employment and Training
- Website: www.dol.gov/agencies/eta

The Employment and Training Administration (ETA) is part of the U.S. Department of Labor. Its mission is to provide training, employment, labor market information, and income maintenance services. ETA administers federal government job training and worker dislocation programs, federal grants to states for Employment Service programs, and unemployment insurance benefits. These services are primarily provided through state and local workforce development systems.

President Joe Biden nominated labor lawyer and Florida politician José Javier Rodríguez for the position of Assistant Secretary for Employment and Training, the agency's leader, on June 2, 2021; he was confirmed by the Senate on March 21, 2024.

== Programs administered ==
- United States Employment Service
- Career Advancement Accounts
- Community-Based Job Training Grants
- Disaster Unemployment Assistance
- Federal Bonding Program
- Foreign Labor Certification
- High Growth Job Training Grants
- Indian and Native American Job Training Program
- Job Corps
- Migrant and Seasonal Farmworker Job Training Program
- National Emergency Grants
- One-Stop Career Centers
- Occupational Information Network (Holland Codes)
- Registered Apprenticeship
- Senior Community Service Employment Program (SCSEP)
- Trade Adjustment Assistance
- Unemployment Insurance
- Wagner-Peyser Act Programs
- Work Opportunity Tax Credit
- Workforce Innovation in Regional Economic Development (WIRED)
- Workforce Innovation and Opportunity Act Adult Job Training Programs
- Workforce Innovation and Opportunity Act Dislocated Worker Programs
- Workforce Innovation and Opportunity Act Youth Job Training Programs
- YouthBuild

== History ==
The agency was founded in 1954 as the Manpower Administration. It was given its present name in 1975.

The most recent confirmed Assistant Secretary is John Pallasch, who was sworn in on July 29, 2019. He resigned on January 20, 2021. Suzan Levine was named as Principal Deputy Assistant Secretary by the incoming Biden administration on January 28, 2021, and served as the Acting Assistant Secretary.

== See also ==
- Title 20 of the Code of Federal Regulations
- Job Corps
