= Job Training Partnership Act of 1982 =

US federal law

Job Training Partnership Act
- Long title: An Act to establish programs to prepare youth and unskilled adults for entry into the labor force, to afford job training to economically disadvantaged and other individuals facing serious barriers to employment, and for other purposes
- Enacted by: the 97th United States Congress
- Effective: October 13, 1982

Citations
- Public law: Pub. L. 97–300

Legislative history
- Introduced in the Senate as S. 2036 by Dan Quayle (R–IN) on February 2, 1982; Committee consideration by Senate Labor and Human Resources; Passed the Senate on July 1, 1982 (95–0); Passed the House on August 4, 1982 (voice vote); Signed into law by President Ronald Reagan on October 13, 1982

The Job Training Partnership Act of 1982 (JTPA, Pub. L. 97–300, 29 U.S.C. § 1501, et seq.) was a United States federal law passed October 13, 1982, by Congress with regulations promulgated by the United States Department of Labor during the Ronald Reagan administration. The law was the successor to the previous federal job training legislation, the Comprehensive Employment and Training Act (CETA). It was repealed by the Workforce Investment Act of 1998 during the administration of President Bill Clinton.

== Purpose ==
The law was enacted to establish federal assistance programs to prepare youth and unskilled adults for entry into the labor force and to provide job training to economically disadvantaged and other individuals facing serious barriers to employment.

In order to carry out its purpose, the law authorized appropriations for fiscal year 1983 and for each succeeding fiscal year to carry out adult and youth programs, federally administered programs, summer youth employment and training programs, and employment and training assistance for dislocated workers.

== Provisions ==
The purpose of this act is delineated into four main programs requiring federal funding.

=== Adult and youth programs ===
- Provides for an education for employment program to maintain networks of learning centers offering individualized instruction in convenient locations and preparing students to meet State and local general education diploma and basic education competency requirements.
- Provides for a pre-employment skills training program for youth aged 14 through 21, with priority given to those who do not meet established academic achievement levels and who plan to enter the full-time labor market upon leaving school.
- Provides for an entry employment experience program for youth who meet certain requirements.
- Provides for a school-to-work transition assistance program for high school seniors with an economic disadvantage and dropouts.

=== Federally administered programs ===
The law provides for seven types of federally administered programs.

==== Employment and training programs for Native Americans and migrant and seasonal farmworkers ====
- Set forth provisions for Native American employment and training programs.
- Directs the Secretary to take appropriate action to establish administrative procedures and machinery (including personnel having particular competence in this field) for the selection, administration, monitoring, and evaluation of Native American employment and training programs, and of migrant and seasonal employment and training programs, under this Act.
- Set forth provisions for migrant and seasonal farmworker employment and training programs. Requires that the public agencies and private nonprofit organizations carrying out program services have a previously demonstrated capability to administer effectively a diversified employability development program for migrant and seasonal farmworkers.
- Directs the Secretary to consult with appropriate State and local officials in administering national farmworker programs.

==== Job Corps ====
- Maintains a Job Corps for economically disadvantaged youth to operate exclusively as a distinct national program.
- Authorizes the Secretary to make payments to individuals and organizations for the cost of candidate recruitment, screening and selection.
- Authorizes the Secretary to arrange for advanced career training programs for selected Corps members for a period of up to one additional year of Corps participation. Permits such programs to be provided by postsecondary institutions or by businesses and labor unions.
- Authorizes the Secretary to provide Corps enrollees with allowances and support.
- Directs the Secretary to disseminate information from Job Corps program experience which may help related programs.
- Authorizes the Secretary to arrange with the Secretary of Defense for pilot projects at Job Corps centers to prepare youth to qualify for military service.
- Authorizes the Secretary to undertake pilot projects using community-based organizations of demonstrated effectiveness for Job Corps center operation.
- Authorizes the Secretary to accept charitable donations on behalf of the Job Corps.

==== Veterans' employment programs ====
- Directs the Secretary to conduct programs to meet the employment and training needs of service-connected disabled veterans, Vietnam-era veterans, and veterans recently separated from military service.

==== National activities ====
- Requires that specified funds be used to provide services authorized under all titles of this Act for employment and training programs that are most appropriately administered from the national level.
- Directs the Secretary to establish a comprehensive program of employment and training research and a program of experimental, developmental, and demonstration projects.
- Authorizes the Secretary to fund pilot projects to help eliminate artificial and other employment barriers faced by persons requiring special assistance.
- Directs the Secretary, in consultation with appropriate officials, to provide personnel training and appropriate technical assistance (including technical assistance to training programs for housing for migrant and seasonal farmworkers) for programs under this Act.

==== Labor market information ====
- Directs the Secretary to set aside, from sums available to the Department of Labor for any fiscal year (including sums available for this title), amounts necessary to maintain a comprehensive labor market information system on a national, regional, State, local or other appropriate basis. Requires such information to be made publicly available in a timely fashion.
- Directs the Secretary to develop and maintain for the Nation, State, and local areas, current employment data by occupation and industry, based on the occupational employment statistics program, including selected sample surveys, and projections by the Bureau of Labor Statistics of employment and openings by occupation.
- Directs the Secretary to maintain descriptions of job duties, training, and education requirements, working conditions, and characteristics of occupations.
- Authorizes the Secretary to develop: (1) data for an annual statistical measure of labor market related economic hardship; and (2) household budget data. Directs the ::*Secretary to publish, at least annually, a report relating labor force status to earnings and income.
- Directs the Secretary to develop and maintain: (1) statistical data relating to permanent lay-offs and plant closings; and (2) publish a report based on such data as soon as practicable after the end of each calendar year
- Authorizes the Secretary to establish and carry out a nationwide computerized job bank and matching program, including the development of an occupational information file.

==== National Commission for Employment Policy ====
- Directs the Secretary to reserve $2,000,000 of the appropriations for this title for each fiscal year to fund the National Commission for Employment Policy. Establishes the Commission and sets forth provisions for its membership, reducing the number of members to 15 and providing for their appointment by the President. Requires that: (1) one of the members be a representative of the National Advisory Council on Vocational Education; and (2) the membership be generally representative of significant segments of the labor force, including women and minority groups. Raises to five the number of additional professional personnel that the Chairman of the Commission may appoint without regard to specified civil service provisions.

==== Training to fulfill affirmative action obligations ====
- Permits contractors to establish or participate in training programs for eligible individuals which are designed to assist such contractors in meeting specified affirmative action obligations. Sets forth requirements for such training programs. Directs the Director of the Office of Federal Contract Compliance Programs to promulgate regulations for affirmative action compliance review of such training programs. Permits such contractors to maintain an abbreviated written affirmative action program. Provides that successful performance or operation of such a training program shall create a presumption that a good faith effort to meet affirmative action obligations has been made.

=== Summer youth employment and training programs ===
- Allocates appropriations to specified territories and to the states for summer youth programs.
- Permits funds available under this title to be used for employment or job training activities designed for employment or employment preparation and placement and supportive services for program participation and employment retention.
- Requires that programs under this title be conducted during the summer months.
- Makes economically disadvantaged persons under the age of 22 eligible for such programs, but permits economically disadvantaged individuals aged 14 or 15 to be eligible, if appropriate and set forth in the job training plan.

=== Employment and training assistance for dislocated workers ===
- Authorizes the Secretary to reserve up to 25 percent of the appropriations for this title for use by states which apply for assistance to provide training, retraining, job search assistance, placement, relocation assistance, and other aid (including specified authorized activities) to individuals who are affected by mass layoffs, natural disasters, federal government actions (such as relocation of Federal facilities or reside in areas of high unemployment or designated enterprise zones).
- Authorizes States to establish procedures to identify substantial groups of eligible individuals who: (1) have been terminated or laid-off or have received notice of termination or layoff, are eligible for or have exhausted entitlement to unemployment compensation, and are unlikely to return to their previous industry or occupation; (2) have been terminated, or have received termination notice, due to permanent closure of a plant or facility; or (3) are long-term unemployed and have limited opportunities for employment or reemployment in the same or similar occupation in their area of residence (including older individuals with substantial barriers to employment by reason of age).
- Requires full consultation with a labor organization before the establishment any assistance program funded under this title which will provide services to a substantial number of members of such labor organization.
- Requires States to submit to the Secretary a plan for use of assistance under this title, including provisions for coordination of programs, low-income weatherization and other energy conservation programs, and social services.

== Analysis and criticisms of JTPA ==
The stated goal of the JTPA is to target an economically disadvantaged population for job training assistance. The funding allocation for the JTPA is determined using a formula that is outlined in Title II. One-third of the funding is allotted based on the relative number of unemployed individuals living in areas of substantial unemployment, one-third is based on the relative excess number of the unemployed, and one-third is based on the relative number of economically disadvantaged individuals. A final stipulation of JTPA is that no state is allowed to receive below a minimum of one quarter of one percent of the total allotment. The money is further divided within the state based on the same criteria. (8) Inconsistencies are likely due to political variables that influenced the formula at the time these policies were developed. These variables include the legislative power of a state's own representatives, a state's ability to influence voters of legislators in other states and executive branch interests. The results of the study conducted by Svorny clearly demonstrate the importance of a state's political power in influencing the votes of representatives (8).

Research has shown that there is an inconsistency between the number of economically disadvantaged in the United States and the number of individuals who actually receive resources and that the number varies across the United States. Concerns were initially raised in 1985, which caused the United States Department of Labor to commission a research study in July 1985 to explore the problems with the current formula. The study further showed that the main issues existed with regards to distributional equity, funding stability, data quality and formula simplicity. When investigating the distribution of funding, researchers found that certain regions, such as the upper Midwest, were over funded while other regions, such as the South, were underfunded (7).

Studies have tried to estimate the impact of the JTPA over the years. The National JTPA study was designed to measure the impact of incremental services provided by the JTPA over time. The study commissioned by the National Department of Labor investigated 21,000 people within 16 centers around the country in 1986. This research found modest positive impacts on adult men as well as adult women, but did cite inconsistencies with regards to out-of-school youths. Welfare mothers appeared to receive the largest impact as a result of the program. In addition, JTPA increased the proportion of dropouts who eventually received a high school credential but only a fraction of the target group members were high school dropouts (1). The National JTPA Study has been criticized for its research design and techniques, however. The biggest issue is that the process through which the sites were selected was not a random one. The sites do resemble the national system in some ways, such as labor market conditions and JTPA project performance. In addition, the samples of individuals in the study were similar regarding age, work experience and ethnicity to those served nationally by the JTPA. The main flaw in the research is that there is no large, central city and that sites serving small numbers of people were not included; the sites which were included did not provide as much on-the-job training than most of the national sites (4).

One criticism of the JTPA is summarized in a 1991 meeting of the Employment and Housing Subcommittee of the Committee on Government Operations focused on race and sex discrimination. Congressman Lantos cited evidence of differential patterns of service and job placement by race. The 1988 Chicago Urban League report stated that African Americans were shown to consistently receive lower job placements and wages. In addition, as stated in the 1991 Employment and Housing Subcommittee meeting, a 1988 Women's Action Alliance report states that the JTPA is ineffective with regards to moving women out of poverty and that occupational segregation is prevalent as evidenced by the fact that the majority of women received jobs in clerical and sales and service rather than other areas (6).

Further criticisms of the JTPA stem from the argument that individuals can take advantage of the system due to the way that it is set up. Cragg claims that measures in the Job Training Partnership Act lead to problems of "moral hazard" which stem from the use of performance incentives in government programs. The Job Training Partnership Act offers a "pay-for-performance system" that focuses on a participant's earnings and a reduction on welfare dependency. Cragg claims that participants may enroll who are capable of high post-training earnings without any actual training. Therefore, some participants are reaping the benefits of the incentives program without an actual need for the government resources (3).

In 1993, the Labor Department released a study that showed that in a study of low-income male out-of-school youth, males in the JTPA program actually had 10 percent lower earnings than males from a similar demographic who never participated in the program. Prior to the study's release, the Labor Department's inspector general stated that young trainees were twice as likely to rely on food stamps after JTPA involvement due to the fact that the training showed the individuals how to apply for food stamps (2).

== Repeal ==
This act was repealed by title I, Sec. 199(b)(2) of the Workforce Investment Act of 1998. Some of the provisions were adjusted for the new act and some were dropped.

See a list of United States federal legislation, 1901-2001, for a chronological list of passed legislation from 1901-2001.

== See also ==
- Northern California Indian Development Council operated a job training program under the JTPA, and continues it under the Workforce Investment Act of 1998.
- Ticket to Work, the Social Security Administration (SSA) program
- Al Angrisani, the Assistant U.S. Secretary of Labor and Chief of Staff from 1980–1984, and one of the primary architects of the act.
