= Office of Workers' Compensation Programs =

Agency overview
- Formed: 1981
- Jurisdiction: Federal government of the United States
- Headquarters: Frances Perkins Building; Washington, D.C.
- Employees: 1,000
- Agency executive: Doug Pennington (Acting)
- Website: www.dol.gov/agencies/owcp

The Office of Workers' Compensation Programs administers four major disability compensation programs which provide wage replacement benefits, medical treatment, vocational rehabilitation and other benefits to certain workers or their dependents who experience work-related injury or occupational disease.

== See also ==
- Federal Employees' Compensation Act of 1916
- Title 20 of the Code of Federal Regulations
- Black Lung Benefits Act of 1972
- Accident Compensation Corporation － New Zealand's equivalent
