= Arlow =

Arlow is both a given name and a surname. Notable people with the name include:

- Arlow Stout (1876–1957), American botanist
- Jacob Arlow (1912–2004), American teacher, scholar, and clinician
- Vyninka Arlow (born 1974), Australian diver
