= Workforce Investment Act of 1998 =

United States federal law, replaced 2014

- Long title: An Act to consolidate, coordinate, and improve employment, training, literacy, and vocational rehabilitation programs in the United States, and for other purposes.
- Enacted by: the 105th United States Congress

Citations
- Public law: Pub. L. 105-220
- Statutes at Large: 112 Stat. 936

Legislative history
- Introduced in the House as H.R. 1385 by Buck McKeon on April 17, 1997; Signed into law by President Bill Clinton on August 7, 1998

The Workforce Investment Act of 1998 (WIA, Pub. L. 105–220 (text) (PDF), 112 Stat. 936, enacted August 7, 1998) was a United States federal law that was repealed and replaced by the 2014 Workforce Innovation and Opportunity Act.

== Purpose ==
The Workforce Investment Act is a federal act that "provides workforce investment activities, through statewide and local workforce investment systems, that increase the employment, retention, and earnings of participants, and increase occupational skill attainment by participants, and, as a result, improve the quality of the workforce, reduce welfare dependency, and enhance the productivity and competitiveness of the Nation." The law was enacted to replace the Job Training Partnership Act and certain other Federal (outlined below in History) and job training laws with new workforce investment systems (or workforce development). The law was enacted during Bill Clinton's second term and attempts to induce business to participate in the local delivery of Workforce Development Services through Workforce Investment Boards (WIBs) which were to be chaired by private sector members of the local community. A majority of board members were also required to represent business interests.

== History ==
=== Job Training and Partnership Act of 1982 ===
The federal Job Training Partnership Act (JTPA) of 1982 was the predecessor of the Workforce Investment Act of 1998. This law used federal funding to implement programs that prepared youth and unskilled adults for entry into the workforce and provided employment-related services for disadvantaged individuals. For each succeeding fiscal year, programs such as adult and youth programs, federally administered programs, summer youth employment training programs and training assistance for dislocated workers were carried out.

=== Comprehensive Employment and Training Act of 1973 ===
The Comprehensive Employment and Training Act of 1973 consolidated all existing federal job-training programs. This act offered work to low-income individuals, long-term unemployed individuals, and out-of-high school individuals. Training and full-time jobs in the public service were provided for unemployed, underemployed, and disadvantaged individuals. In order to decentralize control of federally controlled job training programs, the Act provided funds to state and local governments through federal grants.

=== Rehabilitation Act of 1973 ===
Rehabilitation Act of 1973 authorized: (a) the formula grant programs of vocational rehabilitation, supporting employment, independent living, and client assistance; (b) a variety of training and service-discretionary grants administered by the Rehabilitation Administration; and (c) research activities that were administered by the National Institute on Disability and Rehabilitation Research. Also, this Act prohibited discrimination on the basis of disability and expanded special Federal responsibilities and training programs within the Department of Health, Education and Welfare.

=== Manpower Development Training Act of 1962 ===
The Manpower Development Training Act of 1962 originated when President John F. Kennedy told legislators that "Large scale unemployment during a recession is bad enough, but large scale unemployment during a period of prosperity would be intolerable." This act dealt with this situation by promoting a professional training plan and providing major Federal Funding to the Department of Health, Education and Welfare in order to improve the technical training of the unemployed and underemployed labor in the postwar period. The professional training plan provided federal funding to retain workers displaced because of technological change and for classroom and on-the-job-training targeted to low-income individuals and welfare recipients.

=== Wagner Peyser Act of 1933 ===
The Wagner-Peyser Act of 1933 established a nationwide employment system of public employment offices. These offices were known as the employment service and were created for cooperation of the States in the promotion of system to aid employment.

== Mission and goals ==
The main goal of the WIA is to create a system that provides a means to increase employment, retention, and earnings of individuals. Accomplishing this goal is dependent on the services the WIA provides to increase occupational skill attainment by participants. The WIA is split into five titles that outline how the WIA accomplishes this goal.

=== Title one ===
Title one of the Act authorizes state workforce investment boards, as well as local workforce investment boards. In order to measure how well people are doing in the program, title one requires the use of certain standards for success. Title one also authorizes a one-stop delivery system to be used in the program. This system sets up one place participants can go in their local area to get both job training and referrals. National programs such as jobs corps, Native American, migrant, and veterans programs are also authorized in title one.

=== Title two ===
Title two sets up systems to help adults reach certain literacy levels in order to be successful in the workforce. Adult education is provided to help adults reach a minimum of an 8th grade reading level before entering the workforce.

=== Title three ===
Grants and contracts are authorized in title three to provide and conduct the following training, projects, and services. Grants provide academic training to individuals that provide rehabilitation services to individuals with disabilities. Training to maintain and upgrade basic skills and knowledge of the people providing service delivery and rehabilitation technology services is provided under title three. Grants and contracts are also authorized to conduct special projects and demonstrations that include research and evaluation that expand rehabilitation services. Additionally, vocational rehabilitation services to individuals with disabilities who are migrant or seasonal farmworkers is provided. Grants are also used to initiate recreational programs for individuals with disabilities to aid them in employment, mobility, socialization, independence, and community integration. Lastly, grants and contracts are authorized to provide training and information to individuals with disabilities and their representatives. This training should develop skills necessary for individuals with disabilities to gain access to rehabilitation systems and statewide workforce investment systems and become active decision makers in the rehabilitation process.

=== Title four ===
Title four amends the Rehabilitation Act of 1973 in order to work with the WIA to accomplish the goal of helping people return to the workforce. Title four creates a national council on disability, which is appointed by the president, to link rehabilitation programs to state and local workforce development systems. Members of this council are individuals with disabilities, parents or guardians of individuals with disabilities, or other individuals who have substantial knowledge or experience relating to disability policy or programs. The function of this council is to guarantee that people with disabilities have access to local and state workforce development systems in order to provide equal opportunity.

=== Title five ===
Title five provides general provisions by which the WIA can accomplish its goals. Title five states that the WIA is a state unified plan. Incentive grants will be rewarded to states exceeding negotiated performance levels and defined indicators of performance.

== Provisions ==
The provisions of the Act were delineated into five subchapters:

=== Workforce investment definitions ===
Sets forth definitions for workforce investment programs as cited by the chapter and for future legislation using this Act as basis for funding.

=== Statewide and local workforce investment systems ===
- Directs state governors to establish and appoint the members of a statewide partnership to assist in the development of the state plan.
- Directs state governors to designate local workforce investment areas in accordance with specified requirements.
- Requires that local workforce investment boards, and youth councils within such boards, be established in each local area of a state.

=== Job Corps ===
- Revises provisions for the Job Corps (formerly under the Job Training Partnership Act (JTPA), which this title repeals and replaces.)
- Provides for Job Corps recruitment standards, graduate readjustment allowances through local one-stop customer service centers, industry councils and management information.
- Revises Job Corps requirements for:
  - Individual eligibility
  - Screening, selection, assignment, and enrollment
  - Job Corps Centers
  - Program activities and continued services
  - Counseling and job placement
  - Support
  - Operating plan
  - Standards of conduct
  - Community participation
  - Advisory committees
  - Experimental, research, and demonstration projects.

=== National programs ===
- Provides for workforce investment activities and supplemental services under programs for American Indians, Alaska Natives, and Native Hawaiians, migrant and seasonal farmworkers and veterans (replacing similar programs formerly under JTPA.)
- Directs the Secretary of Labor to make youth opportunity grants to eligible local partnerships to provide specified activities to increase the long-term employment of eligible youth who live in empowerment zones, enterprise communities, and high poverty areas.
- Directs the Secretary to provide assistance to an entity to establish a role model academy for out-of-school youth in a residential center located on the site of a closed or realigned military installation.
- Directs the Secretary of Labor to provide technical assistance to states to help with transitions, general performance improvement, and dislocated worker training improvement.
- Directs the Secretary to publish a biennial plan for demonstration, pilot, multiservice, research, and multistate projects. Sets forth requirements for such projects under such plan, including competitive award procedures and peer review.
- Directs the Secretary to provide for continuing evaluation of programs and activities under this title. Authorizes the Secretary to conduct evaluations of other federally funded employment-related programs and activities.
- Authorizes the Secretary to make national emergency grants for:
  - Employment and training assistance to workers affected by major economic dislocations
  - Disaster relief employment
  - Additional assistance for dislocated workers

=== Administration ===
- Sets forth requirements for:
  - Labor standards, prohibitions on worker displacement, and other requirements relating to use of funds
  - Prompt allocation of funds
  - Monitoring
  - Fiscal controls and sanctions
  - Reports, recordkeeping, and investigations
  - Administrative adjudication
  - Judicial review
  - Nondiscrimination
  - State legislative authority
  - Workforce flexibility partnership plans
  - Use of certain real property
  - Continuation of State activities and policies.
- Declares that a state shall not be prohibited by the federal government from drug use testing of participants in certain workforce investment programs and sanctioning those who test positive.

== Funding and budget ==
Each state receives a different amount from the federal government for their budget under the Workforce Investment Act. The amount in the budget is dependent on the size of population for each State. Utah gets $1.5 million each year from the federal government. Due to the fact that Utah has a relatively small population, compared to other states, the budget stays with the state instead of being distributed to local areas. In larger states, such as California, the budget is much larger and is divided out to local boards. The budget, regardless of the state, can be used for the following three main "streams":

=== Adults ===
The Secretary of Labor reserves Twenty percent of funds for National Emergency Grants, dislocated worker demonstration efforts, and technical assistance.

=== Dislocated workers ===
The remaining 60 are allocated to local areas, while 15 percent being reserved for statewide activities, and 25 percent for State rapid response efforts.

=== Youth ===
Eighty five percent of youth funds are allocated to local areas. Fifteen percent are reserved for statewide activities, and funds appropriated in excess of $1 billion (up to $250 million) will be used by the U.S. Department of Labor to fund Youth Opportunity grants. States can merge the fifteen percent set-asides for statewide activities from the three separate funding streams if they choose to do so (for example, state set-aside funds from the adult stream may be used for statewide youth activities.) Also, with the approval of the Governor, local areas may transfer 20 percent between adult and dislocated workers funding streams.

== Subsequent actions ==
The law was slightly amended by the Carl D. Perkins Vocational and Applied Technology Education Amendments of 1998 and the Higher Education Amendments of 1998.

The Workforce Innovation and Opportunity Act (H.R. 803; 113th Congress) was enacted on July 22, 2014. It seeks to consolidate job training programs under the Workforce Investment Act of 1998 (WIA) and will streamline the process of receiving services from three levels (core, intensive, and training) into a single process, allowing clients to receive needed services earlier in the process. In addition, it will push those providing WIA services to collaborate more with the Vocational Rehabilitation programs in order to provide more services for people with disabilities into a single funding stream. It also amended the Wagner-Peyser Act, reauthorized adult-education programs, and reauthorized programs under the Rehabilitation Act of 1973. The various job programs are authorized for six years with a requirement that they record and report on how many people get new jobs through their participation in the programs. The new regulations are currently in draft form and will not be finalized till January 2016.

== See also ==
- Workforce Investment Board
