= Philip Arnow =

American politician

Philip Arnow worked in the Department of Labor during Dwight D. Eisenhower's presidential administration. From 1951 to 1957 he served as the Associate Director of the Office of International Labor Affairs; and as the Assistant Commissioner of the Publications and Program Planning in the Bureau of Labor Statistics from 1957–1963. He then served as the Executive Director of the Presidential Railroad Commission from 1961–1962.

In 1978, his achievements at the Department of Labor were memorialized with the creation of the Philip Arnow Award, intended to recognize outstanding career employees.
