= Employees' Compensation Appeals Board =

Board overview
- Headquarters: Frances Perkins Building - 200 Constitution Ave NW, Washington, DC
- Board executive: Alec J. Koromilas, Chief Judge and Chairman
- Parent Board: United States Department of Labor
- Website: www.dol.gov/agencies/ecab

The Employees' Compensation Appeals Board (ECAB) was created in 1946 by statute to hear appeals taken from determinations and awards under the Federal Employees' Compensation Act with respect to claims of federal employees injured in the course of their employment. The Board has final authority to determine the liability of the Federal government with respect to the disability or death of employees injured in the scope of their employment. There is no further administrative or judicial appeal of ECAB decisions. The Board, by statute, consists of three Members appointed by the United States Secretary of Labor, one of whom is designated as Chairman of the Board and administrative manager.

== Mission ==
The Board's mission is to hear and decide cases on appeal from decisions of the Office of Workers' Compensation Programs (OWCP) in an impartial and expeditious manner. The decisions of the Board are made in accordance with its statutory mandate, based on a thorough review of the case record as compiled by OWCP. Injured federal workers have the opportunity for a full evidentiary hearing with OWCP's Branch of Hearings and Review prior to review of the record by the Board.

== See also ==
- Title 20 of the Code of Federal Regulations
