= Federal Employees' Compensation Act =

United States federal law

Workingmen's Compensation Act
- Other short titles: Federal Employees' Compensation Act of 1916; Kern–McGillicuddy Act
- Long title: An Act To provide compensation for employees of the United States suffering injuries while in the performance of their duties, and for other purposes
- Acronyms (colloquial): FECA
- Enacted by: the 64th United States Congress
- Effective: September 7, 1916

Citations
- Public law: Public Law 64-267
- Statutes at Large: 39 Stat. 742

Codification
- Acts amended: Federal Employees' Compensation Act of 1908

Legislative history
- Introduced in the House of Representatives as H.R. 15316 by Daniel J. McGillicuddy (D‑ME) on May 1, 1916; Committee consideration by House Committee on the Judiciary; Passed the House of Representatives on July 12, 1916 (288–3); Passed the Senate on August 19, 1916 (Voice vote); Reported by the joint conference committee on August 21 – August 31, 1916; agreed to by the Senate on September 4, 1916 (Voice vote) and by the House of Representatives on September 5, 1916 (Voice vote); Signed into law by President Woodrow Wilson on September 7, 1916

Major amendments
- Federal Employees' Compensation Act Amendments of 1949, 1960, 1966, 1974

United States Supreme Court cases
- Johansen v. United States (1952), Lockheed Aircraft Corp. v. United States (1983)

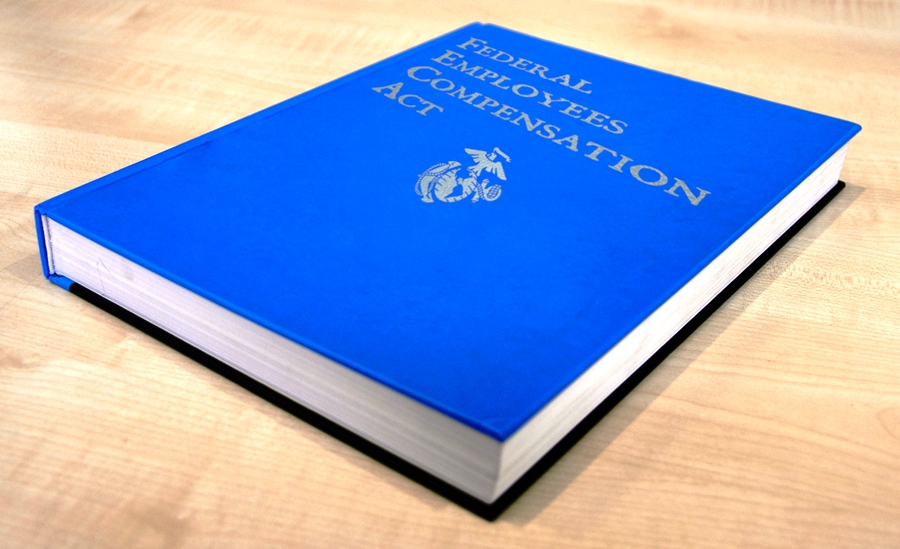

The Federal Employees' Compensation Act (FECA), is a United States federal law, enacted on September 7, 1916. Sponsored by Sen. John W. Kern (D) of Indiana and Rep. Daniel J. McGillicuddy (D) of Maine, it established compensation to federal civil service employees for wages lost due to job-related injuries. This act became the precedent for "disability insurance" across the country and the precursor to broad-coverage health insurance.

President Woodrow Wilson signed H.R. 15316 into law on September 7, 1916.

The Federal Employees' Compensation Commission was the original administrator of the FECA. However, the Commission did not exist at the time the FECA went into effect and claims accumulated for more than six months while members were selected and sworn into office. The Federal Employees' Compensation Commission officially began its duties on March 14, 1917. The commission was abolished on May 16, 1946, by President Harry S. Truman as part of the Reorganization Act of 1939. Its duties were transferred to the Federal Security Agency on July 16, 1946.

The act is now administered by the U.S. Department of Labor.
