= Workforce development =

Approach to economic development

Workforce development, an American approach to economic development, attempts to enhance a region's economic stability and prosperity by focusing on people rather than businesses. It essentially develops a human-resources strategy. Work-force development has evolved from a problem-focused approach, addressing issues such as low-skilled workers or the need for more employees in a particular industry, to a holistic approach considering participants' many barriers and the overall needs of the region.

Work-force development has historically occurred in two forms: place-based strategies that attempt to address the needs of people living in a particular neighborhood, and sector-based strategies that focus on matching workers' skills to needs in an industry already present in the region.

Across both approaches, themes for best practices have emerged. Successful workforce development programs (WDPs) typically have a strong network of ties in a community, and are equipped to respond to changes in their environments. Additionally, they take a holistic approach to the problems faced by participants.

The responsibility for work-force development in the United States has rested on the government's shoulders for at least a century, since the advent of public schools. This formal system of education replaced earlier systems in American history when students whose parents desired them to learn a trade other than their parents' took up apprenticeships. Informal schooling took place at home, depending on the household's ability and income level. Public schools were founded to prepare students to earn a living wage by providing them with skills such as reading and arithmetic. However, employers still typically provided vocational training on-the-job.

Traditional work-force development has been problem-focused. Economic development practitioners evaluated neighborhoods, cities, or states on the basis of perceived weaknesses in human-resource capacity. However, recent efforts view work-force development in a more positive light. Economic developers use work-force development as a way to increase equity among inhabitants of a region. Inner-city residents may not have access to equal education opportunities, and work-force development programs can increase their skill levels so they can compete with suburbanites for high-paying jobs.

Workforce development as of 2016 often takes a more holistic approach, addressing issues such as spatial mismatch or poor transportation to jobs. Programs to train workers often form part of a network of other human-service or community opportunities.

== Workforce Programs ==
Emerging trends in Adult and Career Education are progressively in line with programs aiming at improving people's earning potential and career options by means of workforce development projects. This all-encompassing strategy calls for public and private sector partnership involving local companies, trade groups, and educational institutions. Important services provided include industry-specific education, job ready training, career research, and development of vocational skills.

The focus on matching educational programs with the changing needs of the labor market guarantees that training paths are relevant and responsive to industry demands, therefore reflecting a major trend. Furthermore, there is increasing attention on giving people the means to identify job opportunities that fit their qualifications and interests, thereby enabling career development. As the economy continues to change, workforce development entities are prioritizing the creation of skilled labor pools to meet the competitive needs of businesses, highlighting the critical role of Adult and Career Education in fostering a skilled workforce.

== Approaches to work force development ==
Researchers have categorized two approaches to work force development, sector-based and place-based approaches. The sectoral advocate speaks for the demand side, emphasizing employer- or market-driven strategies, whereas the place-based practitioner is resolutely a believer in the virtue of the supply side: those low-income job seekers who need work and a pathway out of poverty. However, contemporary strategies often use a mixed approach.

=== Sector-based approach ===
==== Description ====
Sector-based approaches consider the sectors, or industries, in a region that are in need of specific workplace skills. These strategies focus on the demand side of workplace development and consider the industries in which it is most likely that new employees will be hired. Sector-based programs may have higher entrance requirements than place-based strategies because their ultimate aim is to aid the sector at which they are targeted, not to increase the general hirability of the most disadvantaged residents.

==== Creation of a sector-based program ====
Sector-based strategies are designed to fit the needs of both industry employers and workers who want to improve their skills and advance their career development. By definition, sector-based approaches must target a specific industry.

An initial assessment can reveal which industries would be good targets for a region, and assessments during the program can help refine the program's focus.

Appropriate strategies are typically created through networks and partnerships. These partnerships are designed to connect low-income or disadvantaged individuals with employment in jobs that offer the promise of financial stability and significant growth in the industry in the near future.

Community involvement is also an important component in building a sector-based strategy. Specifically, the involvement of an intermediary with deep knowledge of the industry is necessary. The intermediary can facilitate partnerships with employers, and help create solutions for both employers and potential employees. Employers will be encouraged to participate in activities such as developing curriculum, creating evaluation and assessment tools, and committing to job shadow programs.

Because the sector approach targets an entire sector, rather than a single company, a sector strategy often involves the government working side by side with industry leaders to help an entire sector become more competitive.

==== Potential barriers ====
Several potential barriers exist for employing sector-based work force development strategies. First, in many regions a skills gap exists between what workers know and what employers need. Although demand might be high for a particular occupation, it may be unrealistic to train a low-skill population in the necessary skills.

Second, rapid change makes sector-based strategies difficult. Quick turnover in technology can make a training program obsolete in a few years. There is also the recent development of companies outsourcing or sub-contracting as well as giving out temporary work. In order to be competitive in the marketplace they need to reduce costs and increase flexibility.

Last, many potential workers in the United States demonstrate low literacy or educational levels. In some regions, work force development programs will have to spend resources teaching basic life skills like literacy or budgeting, before moving on to relevant employment and workforce trainings.

=== Place-based approach ===
==== Description ====
Place-based approaches, which consider the supply side of the workplace (workers), are primarily focused on the characteristics of people in the region or community where the training program will be located. Place-based strategies often help participants gain initial access to the labor market while addressing other essential concerns to the region, such as housing development or English skills. In general, place-based approaches aim at training the unemployed workers and enhancing their skills for entering the labor market.

Place-based strategies have been criticized for their focus on finding jobs for participants quickly, rather than evaluating the quality of those jobs

==== Local and community-based development programs ====
At the local and community level, employment training has become a source of economic potential for many OECD countries. Local areas are now considered sites of implementation that can be specifically adjusted to the needs of its members. Because of this, supporting local economies has become a regional concern. Strategies to support their economic development capitalize upon local competitive advantages, undertaking entrepreneurial approaches utilizing individual skills rather than other assets . A main component of creating success for individuals within the labor market is relying on partnerships with other various organizations, and providing supplemental vocational training, placement, and reintegration services to be able to concretely “upgrade the skills of low-qualified workers”. Programs that are able to achieve this involve potential employers in the process from day one, and secure participants interviews after graduation. These programs are typically run and staffed by a mix of professionals from government, nonprofit, private sectors, and graduates of the programs, all working together to connect people with jobs and training opportunities.

==== Elements of place-based programs ====
Place-based approaches have provided an ideal framework for state and local government to address the issue of unemployment and poverty problems in local communities or regions. A strong place-based effort will focus on the most pressing needs of local residents, such as physical or substance abuse or financial difficulties, along with providing employment training. The program may want to provide mentors who can connect participants to resources, rather undertaking the large financial burden of providing these services.

==== Potential barriers ====
Not only do programs have to think about placing individuals into jobs in demand that fits the individuals' skill, but programs also have to consider the stability of jobs they place individuals in and the opportunities for growth the jobs provide.

== Core concerns ==
Skills, networks, careers, and collaboration play a key part in the concept and implementation of workforce development programs.

=== Skills ===
The acquisition and development of skills is one of the crucial aspects of workforce development training. Two types of skills are commonly defined: general skills and job-specific skills. Described by their name, general skills (language, writing, basic computer skills) can be used in various careers and job-specific skills (like a particular computer application) are more directed towards the demands of the occupation. The more specialized skills get, the more thought programs have to put in when deciding whether or not the benefits of training is worth the costs, considering job-specific skills only apply to a limited set of jobs. Through this process of skills formation, programs work to increase their trainees' human capital. By making this investment, businesses proactively increase their workers' productivity and efficiency, maximizing their own profit. The general guide for evaluating the effectiveness of a skill-building system is measuring the increase in skills, the increase in "productivity and earnings in the labor market" from this added skill, and the rate of return in terms of cost.

Workforce development programs and federal training programs also have to be careful in what kind of skills they intend their workers to gain. "Developing skills in fields not in demand can lead to frustration, job dissatisfaction, lower wages, and not necessarily to more good jobs".

In recent years, economists has noticed a growing occurrence in skills mismatch where the education received through the public education system, does not align with the kind of education needed for high wage, steady careers. Though workforce development strives to remedy the effects of this problem, the only way to truly fix it is to address the root of the problem which concerns primary and secondary education systems.

=== Networks ===
Workforce development tackles systemic inequalities in the labor market by operating on both sides, efficiently connecting workers with jobs and employers with workers. Theories on networks have emphasized the importance of who you know, rather than what you know which is an attributing factor for some labor market inequalities regarding gender, racial minorities, and the poor. Individuals are more likely to hear about job opportunities from those of the same sex, and women are more likely to search for jobs closer to home than men are, contributing to the perpetuation of occupational inequalities by sex. Living in inner-city communities and belonging to a minority group isolates those individuals from networks of the gainfully employed. Connecting disadvantaged workers to good jobs is not impossible however, and the Center of Employment Training (CET) in San Jose has found a successful way of operating it. CET had networks with employers to identify skill demands and even stronger networks with individuals in the community they were serving.

=== Careers ===
Another key part in workforce development's service for individuals is career advancement. This guidance on paths and barriers to advancement is especially relevant today, where the practice of internal labor markets is uncommon, particularly among women and minorities. In the past, advancement often took place in internal labor markets (ILMs) so promotions and upward mobility occurred within the same firm workers were hired in. "They promoted predictability, stability, and long-term skill development". ILMs no longer dominate the field of career advancement as a result of the dualization of labor markets. This term refers to the noticeable split in "primary sector" and "secondary sector jobs" where the former is recognized for high skills, wages, and stability while the latter is marked by the opposite. "Ongoing corporate restructuring has shifted risk of economic instability from firms onto workers and households, rendered opportunities for upward mobility within firms more opaque and elusive, and weakened institutions (i.e., unions) for worker voice and democratic decision making on the job". These recent challenges make the role of workforce development programs all the more valuable.

=== Public and private collaboration ===
Collaboration between public organizations (a non profit or government administered organization like Job Corps) and private corporations is an essential aspect of workforce development. Research by Harvard professor James E. Austin has defined three stages of collaboration: philanthropic, transactional, and integrative. Timberland's and City Year's partnership exemplifies the purpose of workforce development and Austin uses the development of their relationship as an example for all three stages.

==== Philanthropic ====
In the philanthropic stage, the relationship between the partners is donor and receiver. For Timberland, this meant donating 50 pairs of boots to City Year for their youth service corps uniform. This one sided exchange of economic resources required low investment by Timberland as the charity was considered a "peripheral part" of their activities, and no investment by City Year as there was no reciprocity.

==== Transactional ====
The next stage, transactional, is defined by more involvement by both partners and an increased flow of mutual resources. Timberland supplied City Year's entire uniform and raised their contribution to $1 million. They assisted the non-profit with "finances, marketing, and human resource management". In return, "City Year organized community service projects for Timberland employees" and "led Timberland employees in team building and diversity training". The exchange of resources is no longer one-sided in the transactional stage. Timberland builds their brand by adding a new element of social involvement within and outside the company. City Year fulfills its mission of promoting "civic engagement, not just by its youth corps members but also by corporations and other elements of society". Both partners are involved in contributing to each other's value construct.

==== Integration ====
The highest level of collaboration is integration. This stage requires further involvement than the transactional stage and is characterized by "imprinting" on each other's organizational culture. City Year's commitment to community service has been engrained in Timberland, now that their employees get 40 hours of paid time off each year for service activities. The company has helped City Year in expanding its operations nationally. The jump from transactional to integrative may be hard to measure, but Chief Operating officer of Timberland Jeff Schwartz clarifies the difference. Under the transactional stage, a board member's work on City Year's financial plans and business policies could count as paid-time community service. Under the integrative stage, these actions would be considered "no different than being out assisting one of the company's manufacturing plants". Though the two organizations are still identified as separate entities, there exists a "merged identity" when the two work together. Schwartz claim the company is "much more linked" and "not simply personal, [but] collective" with City Year in this relationship.

== Government policy ==
Policies such as the Workforce Innovation and Opportunity Act are designed to support job seekers by improving access to employment, education, training, and support services. These laws also help connect employers with a skilled workforce, ensuring they can compete effectively in the global economy.

=== Workforce Innovation and Opportunity Act ===
The Workforce Innovation and Opportunity Act (WIOA) was enacted in 2014 to help Americans with significant barriers to employment attain high-quality jobs. The WIOA was designed to address gaps in employment sectors and create programs dedicated to filling those gaps. This is a landmark legislation for those who are unable or choose to not participate in higher education. The WIOA grants funding for the unemployed to access vocational training, apprenticeships, and adult education. It allows workforce development programs to create specialized pathways, rather than programs with no guidance or relevant education. Especially salient for the impoverished, previously incarcerated, or disabled, the WIOA boasts an employment rate of 73.4% for individuals who have completed their respective programs. The WIOA aids system impacted youth because of the allocation of funding to workforce development programs designed for youth. 16% of those participating in programs funded by the WIOA are youth.

Some complications with the WIOA include lack of adequate funding and extenuating circumstances that prevent people from seeking programs funded by the WIOA. Extenuating circumstances like lack of proper food, shelter, and housing may limit program effectiveness.

== Barriers to workforce development collaborations ==
Collaborations are key to the success of workforce development programs but factors like competition, high initial upfront costs, and fragmented governance make it hard for programs to work together.

=== Competition ===
The workforce development system has recently been experiencing increased competition as new actors enter, resources dwindle, performance measures arise, and federal funding decreases. These factors, especially the cuts in federal funding, pressure organizations to collaborate with other organizations that oftentimes have different missions. The forced partnerships resulting from this bring new factors to the table, heightening the chaos within the already struggling system. Though required partnerships sound positive or at least non-competitive, it is important to remember that workforce development agencies prioritize themselves first, as any organization would. The competition for scarce resources is fierce when trying to accomplish and even surpass new performance measures to secure more funding and stay in business. This is where the root of tension and hesitancy to collaboration lies- with institutions fighting for survival in the midst of partnership with others.

=== High initial upfront costs ===
In order for collaborations to be relatively successful, the companies involved are expected to spend a significant amount of time and resources in discussing labor market issues and the ways in which these issues should be addressed in the partnership. In addition, they have to weigh the costs and benefits, and recognize the values of a future in cooperation which are customarily seen long term. Proposals should be specific and codeveloped so there is a clear structure to the work. "Starting with a full consideration of what all sides need lays the base for a successful partnership". Considering there are no short term incentives to reward this front load effort required from companies engaging in collaboration, the motivation to do so is weak.

To combat these high initial upfront costs, some organizations with complementary interests collaborate with each other to form "clusters". With a common goal driving the group, there is noticeably increased efficiency in providing services which is why there is a faster return on investments working like this. Unfortunately, the success of agencies with similar missions clustering together discourages more comprehensive collaborations.

=== Fragmented governance ===
Inherent to the concept of partnership and collaboration is the meshing of various organizations. When these diverse companies join, the accountability systems and governances they once individually had vanish. They lack "a centralized authority through which leadership, accountability, and governance can be provided which may hinder workforce development collaborations".

The root of a faulty framework stems from the fact that most collaborations are only established through memorandums of understanding (MOUs). This expression of agreement does not do enough to address large governance issues, ensure participation among the collaboration, define leadership, and add more specified accountability measures.

== Successful conditions for work force development programs ==
Although workforce development strategies vary by whether they are focused on demands due to the location or from industries in the area, or both, common threads run through the success stories evaluated by economic developers thus far.

=== Pre-assessment of community needs ===
Prior to implementing a sector- or place-based approach, an analysis of the community's current and anticipated needs should be undertaken. One report details a sector analysis to determine the need for more healthcare workers in a particular community, for example. Another example might be the pay for a particular position being aligned with the cost of housing in a particular area.

=== Ties with employers ===
Both sector and place-based strategies emphasize the importance of ties with the employers. Even in place-based strategies focused on finding work quickly must tie efforts to employers to determine who is hiring.

In place-based programs, this may entail determining general skills that are lacking in a specific population such as English-speaking skills.

Work force development programs can be evaluated based on the strength and number of ties with community employers during the creation stage of the program, as well as their ongoing participation to constantly assess which skills are most needed. “Employer leadership is key to long-term reform” of work force development systems.

Programs that maintain high standards for participants may build credibility with partner employees, potentially expanding the number of employment opportunities available.

=== Adaptability ===
Programs must be flexible, so that they can change when market or work force conditions change. One marker of adaptability is the presence of mechanisms to listen to what the community saying, evidenced by the close ties with community stakeholders and nonprofits as explained above.

Another area where this characteristic is important is with participant training. Programs should take into account how skilled participants are when coming into the program and the pace that participants works at. Consideration of these factors on a person-to-person basis is important to develop participants' skills more efficiently and keep participants engaged. Programs should recognize that skills for a job are not the only keys to success for the job. "Individuals need to understand the norms and culture of the workplace. Thus programs pay a great deal of attention not only to the content of training curricula but also to the atmosphere and culture of the training program".

== See also ==
- Career and Technical Education
- Social policy
