= United States Department of Labor =

U.S. federal government department

- Seal of the U.S. Department of Labor

- Flag of the U.S. Department of Labor

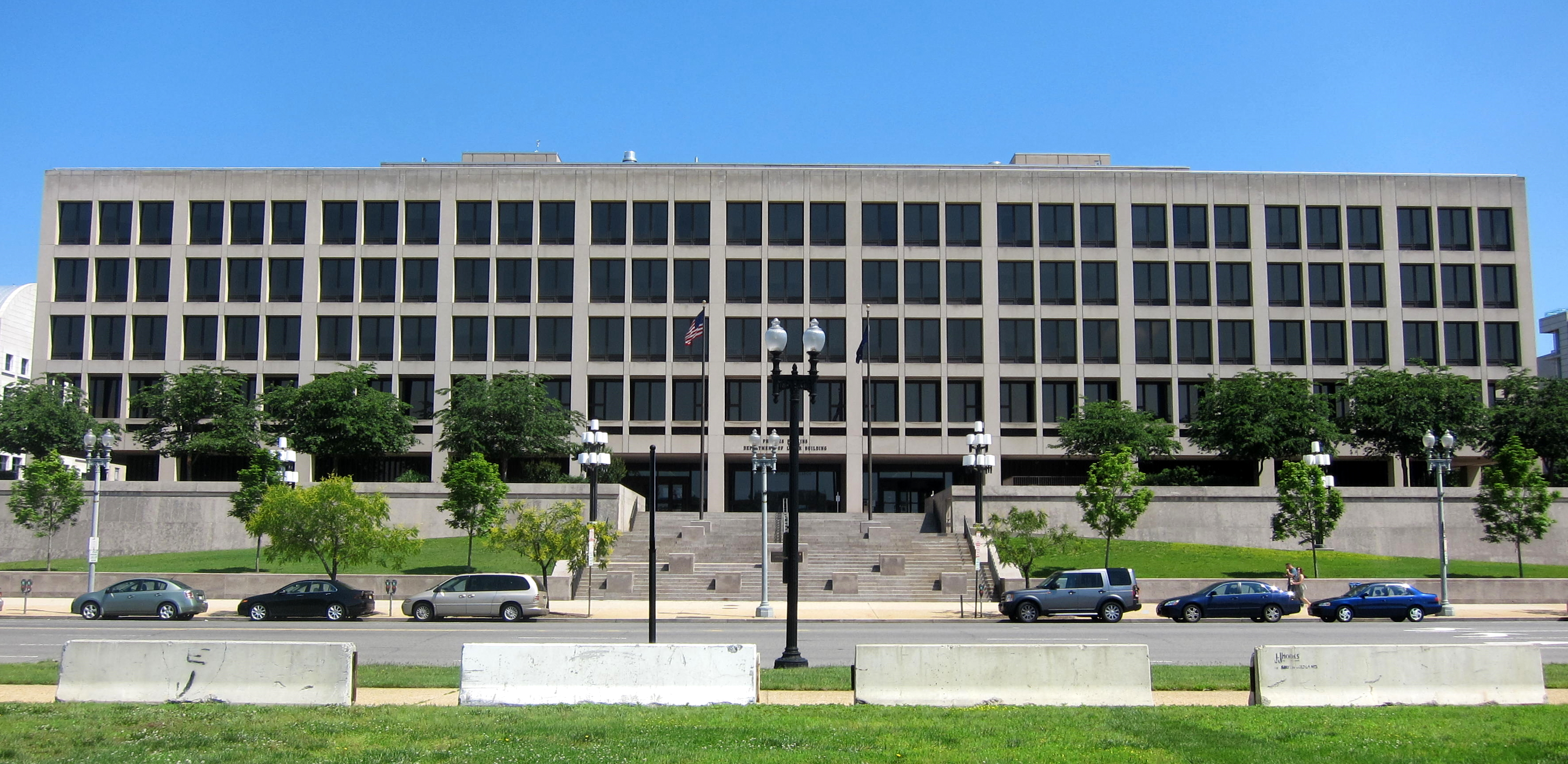
- The Frances Perkins Building, which serves as the headquarters of the U.S. Department of Labor

Agency overview
- Formed: March 4, 1913
- Preceding agency: United States Department of Commerce and Labor
- Jurisdiction: Federal Government of the United States
- Headquarters: Frances Perkins Building 200 Constitution Avenue northwest Washington, D.C., U.S.; 38°53′35″N 77°00′52″W
- Employees: 16,922 (2023)
- Annual budget: $14.6 billion (FY2023)
- Secretary responsible: Keith Sonderling
- Deputy Secretary responsible: Vacant
- Website: dol.gov

The United States Department of Labor (DOL) is one of the executive departments of the U.S. federal government. It is responsible for the administration of federal laws governing occupational safety and health, wage and hour standards, unemployment benefits, reemployment services, and occasionally, economic statistics. It is headed by the secretary of labor, who reports directly to the president of the United States and is a member of the president's Cabinet.

The purpose of the Department of Labor is to foster, promote, and develop the well-being of the wage earners, job seekers, and retirees of the United States; improve working conditions; advance opportunities for profitable employment; and assure work-related benefits and rights. In carrying out this mission, the Department of Labor administers and enforces more than 180 federal laws and thousands of federal regulations. These mandates and the regulations that implement them cover many workplace activities for about 10 million employers and 125 million workers.

The department's headquarters is housed in the Frances Perkins Building, named in honor of Frances Perkins, secretary of labor from 1933 to 1945 and the first female presidential Cabinet member in U.S. history.

== History ==
The former flag of the U.S. Department of Labor, used from 1914 to 1960

In 1884, the U.S. Congress first established a Bureau of Labor Statistics with the Bureau of Labor Act, to collect information about labor and employment. This bureau was under the Department of the Interior. The bureau started collecting economic data in 1884, and published their first report in 1886. Later, in 1888, the Bureau of Labor became an independent Department of Labor, but lacked executive rank.

In February 1903, it became a bureau again when the Department of Commerce and Labor was established.

United States president William Howard Taft signed the March 4, 1913, bill (the last day of his presidency), establishing the Department of Labor as its own Cabinet-level department. William B. Wilson was appointed as the first secretary of labor on March 5, 1913, by President Wilson. As part of this action, the United States Conciliation Service was created as an agency within the department; its purpose was to provide mediation for labor disputes. In October 1919, Secretary Wilson chaired the first meeting of the International Labour Organization even though the U.S. was not yet a member.

In September 1916, the Federal Employees' Compensation Act introduced benefits to workers who are injured or contract illnesses in the workplace. The act established an agency responsible for federal workers' compensation, which was transferred to the Labor Department in the 1940s and has become known as the Office of Workers' Compensation Programs.

Frances Perkins, the first female cabinet member, was appointed to be Secretary of Labor by President Roosevelt on March 4, 1933. Perkins served for 12 years, and became the longest-serving secretary of labor.

The passage of the Taft–Hartley Act in 1947 led to the end of the U.S. Conciliation Service, which was reconstituted outside the department as a new independent agency, the Federal Mediation and Conciliation Service.

During the John F. Kennedy Administration, planning was undertaken to consolidate most of the department's offices, then scattered around more than 20 locations. In the mid‑1960s, construction on the "New Labor Building" began and construction was finished in 1975. In 1980, it was named in honor of Frances Perkins.

President Lyndon B. Johnson asked Congress to consider the idea of reuniting Commerce and Labor.

He argued that the two departments had similar goals and that they would have more efficient channels of communication in a single department. However, Congress never acted on it.

In the 1970s, following the civil rights movement, the Labor Department under Secretary George P. Shultz made a concerted effort to promote racial diversity in unions.

In 1978, the Department of Labor created the Philip Arnow Award, intended to recognize outstanding career employees such as the eponymous Philip Arnow. In the same year, Carin Clauss became the department's first female solicitor of the department.

In 2010, a local of the American Federation of Government Employees stated their unhappiness that a longstanding flextime program reduced under the George W. Bush administration had not been restored under the Obama administration. Department officials said the program was modern and fair and that it was part of ongoing contract negotiations with the local.

In August 2010, the Partnership for Public Service ranked the Department of Labor 23rd out of 31 large agencies in its annual "Best Places to Work in the Federal Government" list.

In December 2010, Secretary of Labor Hilda Solis was named the chair of the U.S. Interagency Council on Homelessness, of which Labor has been a member since its beginnings in 1987.

In July 2011, Ray Jefferson, Assistant Secretary for VETS resigned due to his involvement in a contracting scandal.

In March 2013, the department began commemorating its centennial.

In July 2013, Tom Perez was confirmed as Secretary of Labor. According to remarks by Perez at his swearing-in ceremony, "Boiled down to its essence, the Department of Labor is the department of opportunity."

In April 2017, Alexander Acosta was confirmed as the new secretary of labor. In July 2019, Acosta resigned due to a scandal involving his role in the plea deal with Jeffrey Epstein. He was succeeded on September 30, 2019, by Eugene Scalia. Scalia served until the beginning of the Biden administration on January 20, 2021. Marty Walsh was confirmed as secretary on March 22, 2021. Walsh resigned on March 11, 2023, and was succeeded by deputy secretary Julie Su, who served in an acting position until January 20, 2025. Lori Chavez-DeRemer was sworn in as Secretary of Labor on March 11, 2025.

== Agencies, boards, bureaus, offices, programs, library and corporation of the department ==
- Administrative Review Board (ARB)
- Benefits Review Board (BRB)
- Bureau of Apprenticeship and Training (BAT)
- Bureau of International Labor Affairs (ILAB)
- Bureau of Labor Statistics (BLS)
- Center for Faith and Opportunity Initiative (CFOI)
- Employee Benefits Security Administration (EBSA)
- Employees' Compensation Appeals Board (ECAB)
- Ombudsman for the Energy Employees Occupational Illness Compensation Program (EEOMBD)
- Employment and Training Administration (ETA)
- Mine Safety and Health Administration (MSHA)
- Occupational Safety and Health Administration (OSHA)
- Office of Administrative Law Judges (OALJ)
- Office of the Assistant Secretary for Administration and Management (OASAM)
  - Office of the Chief Information Officer (OCIO)
- Office of the Assistant Secretary for Policy (OASP)
- Office of the Chief Financial Officer (OCFO)
- Office of Congressional and Intergovernmental Affairs (OCIA)
- Office of Disability Employment Policy (ODEP)
- Office of Federal Contract Compliance Programs (OFCCP)
- Office of Inspector General (OIG)
- Office of Labor-Management Standards (OLMS)
- Office of Public Affairs (OPA)
- Office of Public Liaison (OPL)
- Office of the Secretary (OSEC)
  - Office of the Deputy Secretary
- Office of the Solicitor (SOL)
- Office of Unemployment Insurance Modernization (OUIM)
- Office of Workers' Compensation Programs (OWCP)
- Pension Benefit Guaranty Corporation
  - PBGC Office of the Inspector General
- Veterans' Employment and Training Service (VETS)
- Wage and Hour Division (WHD)
- Women's Bureau (WB)

=== Other ===
- Wirtz Labor Library
- Job Corps

== Relevant legislation ==
- 1926: Railway Labor Act
- 1947: Taft–Hartley Act PL 80-101
- 1949: Fair Labor Standards Amendment PL 81-393
- 1953: Small Business Act PL 83-163
- 1954: Internal Revenue Code PL 83-591
- 1955: Fair Labor Standards Amendment PL 84-381
- 1958: Small Business Administration extension PL 85-536
- 1961: Fair Labor Standards Amendment PL 87-30
- 1961: Area Redevelopment Act PL 87-27
- 1962: Manpower Development and Training Act PL 87-415
- 1962: Public Welfare Amendments PL 87-543
- 1963: Amendments to National Defense Education Act PL 88-210
- 1964: Economic Opportunity Act PL 88-452
- 1965: Vocational Rehabilitation Act amended PL 89-333
- 1965: Executive Order 11246, rescinded by Secretary’s Order 03-2025.
- 1965: McNamara–O'Hara Service Contract Act
- 1966: Fair Labor Standards Amendment PL 89-601
- 1970: Occupational Safety and Health Act
- 1973: Comprehensive Employment and Training Act PL 93-203
- 1973: Section 503 of the Rehabilitation Act PL 93-112
- 1974: Fair Labor Standards Amendment PL 93-259
- 1974: Vietnam Era Veterans' Readjustment Assistance Act PL 92-540
- 1974: Employee Retirement Income Security Act of 1974 (ERISA) Pub.L. 93-406
- 1975: Revenue Adjustment Act (Earned Income Tax Credit) PL 94-12, 164
- 1976: Overhaul of vocational education programs PL 94-482
- 1976: Social Security Act Amendments (Aid to Day Care Centers) PL 94-401
- 1977: Fair Labor Standards Amendment PL 95-151
- 1977: Federal Mine Safety and Health Act
- 1978: Full Employment and Balanced Growth Act PL 95-523
- 1981: Budget Reconciliation Act PL 97-35
- 1982: Job Training Partnership Act PL 97-300
- 1983: Migrant and Seasonal Agricultural Workers Protection Act PL 99-603
- 1988: Family Support Act PL 100-485
- 1988: Employee Polygraph Protection Act
- 1989: Fair Labor Standards Amendment PL 101-157
- 1990: Omnibus Budget Reconciliation Act PL 101-508
- 1993: Family and Medical Leave Act PL 103-3
- 1993: Omnibus Budget Reconciliation and Bankruptcy Act PL 103-66
- 1996: Small Business Job Protection Act of 1996 PL 104-188
- 1996: Personal Responsibility and Work Opportunity Act PL 104-193
- 1996: Veterans Employment Opportunities Act PL 105-339
- 1998: Workforce Investment Act of 1998
- 2014: Workforce Innovation and Opportunity Act

== See also ==
- Ministry of Labour links to articles on national ministries or departments worldwide, and US states
- Equal Employment Opportunity Commission
- National Labor Relations Board
- Occupational Information Network (Holland Codes)
- Ticket to Work
- Title 20 of the Code of Federal Regulations, on Employee's benefits
