= Gade v. National Solid Wastes Management Ass'n =

Gade v. National Solid Wastes Management Association
- Supreme Court of the United States

Argued March 23, 1992 Decided June 18, 1992
- Full case name: Gade, Director, Illinois Environmental Protection Agency v. National Solid Wastes Management Association
- Citations: 505 U.S. 88 (more) 112 S. Ct. 2374; 120 L. Ed. 2d 73; 1992 U.S. LEXIS 3686; 60 U.S.L.W. 4587; 1992 OSHD (CCH) ¶ 29,709; 15 OSHC (BNA) 1673; 92 Cal. Daily Op. Service 5098; 92 Daily Journal DAR 8187; 22 ELR 21073; 6 Fla. L. Weekly Fed. S 456

Case history
- Prior: Nat'l Solid Wastes Mgmt. Ass'n v. Killian, 918 F.2d 671 (7th Cir. 1991); cert. granted, 502 U.S. 1012 (1991).

Holding
- OSHA regulations covering crane safety implicitly preempt state law in this area because state law would stand as an obstacle to the purpose of the regulations.

Court membership
- Chief Justice William Rehnquist Associate Justices Byron White · Harry Blackmun; John P. Stevens · Sandra Day O'Connor; Antonin Scalia · Anthony Kennedy; David Souter · Clarence Thomas

Case opinions
- Majority: O'Connor (parts I, III, IV), joined by Rehnquist, White, Scalia, Kennedy
- Plurality: O'Connor (part II), joined by Rehnquist, White, Scalia
- Concurrence: Kennedy
- Dissent: Souter, joined by Blackmun, Stevens, Thomas

Laws applied
- U.S. Const. art. VI

Gade v. National Solid Wastes Management Association, 505 U.S. 88 (1992), is a United States labor law case of the United States Supreme Court. The Court determined that federal Occupational Safety and Health Administration regulations preempted various Illinois provisions for licensing workers who handled hazardous waste materials.

== Facts ==
The National Solid Wastes Management Association, a business group, sought an injunction against two Illinois statutes requiring workers get training and pass exams to handle hazardous waste. It argued these statutes were preempted by the Occupational Safety and Health Act and Occupational Safety and Health Administration regulations implementing a requirement of the Superfund Amendments and Reauthorization Act of 1986 which also standards to train workers who handle hazardous wastes. The claim was brought against petitioner Gade's predecessor as director of the state environmental protection agency.

The District Court held that the state acts were not preempted because they protected public safety and promoted job safety, but it invalidated some provisions of the acts.

The Seventh Circuit Court of Appeals affirmed in part and reversed in part, holding that the OSH Act preempts any state law that "constitutes, in a direct, clear and substantial way, regulation of worker health and safety," unless the Secretary of Labor has explicitly approved the law pursuant to § 18 of the OSH Act. In remanding, the court did not consider which, if any, of the provisions would be pre-empted.

== Judgment ==
O'Connor J, writing for the majority, reiterated the ways in which federal law can preempt state law.

Pre-emption may be either expressed or implied, and "is compelled whether Congress' command is explicitly stated in the statute's language or implicitly contained in its structure and purpose." Jones v. Rath Packing Co., 430 U.S. 519, 525, 97 S.Ct. 1305, 1309, 51 L.Ed.2d 604 (1977); Shaw v. Delta Air Lines, Inc., 463 U.S. 85, 95, 103 S.Ct. 2890, 2899, 77 L.Ed.2d 490 (1983); Fidelity Federal Savings & Loan Assn. v. De la Cuesta, 458 U.S. 141, 152-153, 102 S.Ct. 3014, 3022, 73 L.Ed.2d 664 (1982). Absent explicit pre-emptive language, we have recognized at least two types of implied pre-emption: field pre-emption, where the scheme of federal regulation is " 'so pervasive as to make reasonable the inference that Congress left no room for the States to supplement it,' " id., at 153, 102 S.Ct., at 3022 (quoting Rice v. Santa Fe Elevator Corp., 331 U.S. 218, 230, 67 S.Ct. 1146, 1152, 91 L.Ed. 1447 (1947)), and conflict pre-emption, where "compliance with both federal and state regulations is a physical impossibility," Florida Lime & Avocado Growers, Inc. v. Paul, 373 U.S. 132, 142-143, 83 S.Ct. 1210, 1217-1218, 10 L.Ed.2d 248 (1963), or where state law "stands as an obstacle to the accomplishment and execution of the full purposes and objectives of Congress." Hines v. Davidowitz, 312 U.S. 52, 67, 61 S.Ct. 399, 404, 85 L.Ed. 581 (1941); Felder v. Casey, 487 U.S. 131, 138, 108 S.Ct. 2302, 2306, 101 L.Ed.2d 123 (1988); Perez v. Campbell, 402 U.S. 637, 649, 91 S.Ct. 1704, 1711, 29 L.Ed.2d 233 (1971).

Our ultimate task in any pre-emption case is to determine whether state regulation is consistent with the structure and purpose of the statute as a whole. Looking to "the provisions of the whole law, and to its object and policy," Pilot Life Ins. Co. v. Dedeaux, 481 U.S. 41, 51, 107 S.Ct. 1549, 1555, 95 L.Ed.2d 39 (1987) (internal quotation marks and citations omitted), we hold that nonapproved state regulation of occupational safety and health issues for which a federal standard is in effect is impliedly pre-empted as in conflict with the full purposes and objectives of the OSH Act. Hines v. Davidowitz, supra. The design of the statute persuades us that Congress intended to subject employers and employees to only one set of regulations, be it federal or state, and that the only way a State may regulate an OSHA-regulated occupational safety and health issue is pursuant to an approved state plan that displaces the federal standards.

...

1. This state law is an occupational safety and health standard within the meaning of the OSH Act, regardless of whether it has another, nonoccupational purpose, based on the criterion that it directly, substantially, and specifically regulates occupational safety and health. In assessing a state law's impact on the federal scheme, this Court has refused to rely solely on the legislature's professed purpose and has looked as well to the law's effects. See, e.g., Perez v. Campbell, 402 U.S. 637, 651-652, 91 S.Ct. 1704, 1712-1713, 29 L.Ed.2d 233. State laws of general applicability, such as traffic and fire safety laws, would generally not be pre-empted, because they regulate workers simply as members of the general public. Pp. 104-108.
2. The state licensing acts are pre-empted by the OSH Act to the extent that they establish occupational safety and health standards for training those who work with hazardous wastes. The Act's saving provisions are not implicated and Illinois does not have an approved plan. Illinois' interest in establishing standards for licensing various occupations, cf., e.g., Goldfarb v. Virginia State Bar, 421 U.S. 773, 792, 95 S.Ct. 2004, 2015, 44 L.Ed.2d 572, cannot save from OSH Act pre-emption those provisions that directly and substantially affect workplace safety, since any state law, however clearly within a State's acknowledged power, must yield if it interferes with or is contrary to federal law, Felder v. Casey, 487 U.S. 131, 138, 108 S.Ct. 2302, 2306, 101 L.Ed.2d 123. Nor can the acts be saved from pre-emption by Gade's argument that they regulate a "pre-condition" to employment rather than occupational safety and health, since SARA makes clear that the training of employees engaged in hazardous waste operations is an occupational safety and health issue and that certification requirements before an employee may engage in such work are occupational safety and health standards. This Court does not specifically consider which of the licensing acts' provisions will be pre-empted under the foregoing analysis. Pp. 108-109.

O'Connor, joined by Chief Justice Rehnquist, Justice White and Justice Scalia, concluded in Part II that the OSH Act impliedly pre-empts any state regulation of an occupational safety or health issue with respect to which a federal standard has been established, unless a state plan has been submitted and approved pursuant to § 18(b) of the Act. The Act as a whole demonstrates that Congress intended to promote occupational safety and health while avoiding subjecting workers and employers to duplicative regulation. Thus, it established a system of uniform federal standards, but gave States the option of pre-empting the federal regulations entirely pursuant to an approved state plan that displaces the federal standards. This intent is indicated principally in § 18(b)'s statement that a State "shall" submit a plan if it wishes to "assume responsibility" for developing and enforcing health and safety standards. Gade's interpretation of § 18(b)—that the Secretary's approval is required only if a State wishes to replace, not merely supplement, the federal regulations would be inconsistent with the federal scheme and is untenable in light of the surrounding provisions. The language and purposes of §§ 18(a), (c), (f), and (h) all confirm the view that the States cannot assume an enforcement role without the Secretary's approval, unless no federal standard is in effect. Also unacceptable is Gade's argument that the OSH Act does not pre-empt nonconflicting state laws because those laws, like the Act, are designed to promote worker safety. Even where such laws share a common goal, a state law will be pre-empted if it interferes with the methods by which a federal statute was intended to reach that goal. International Paper Co. v. Ouellette, 479 U.S. 481, 494, 107 S.Ct. 805, 812, 93 L.Ed.2d 883. Here, the Act does not foreclose a State from enacting its own laws, but it does restrict the ways in which it can do so. pp. 96–104.

== Concurrence ==
Justice Kennedy concurred but thought that Congress had expressly preempted this area and that the application of implicit preemption in this case expanded the doctrine too far. Kennedy, agreeing that the state laws are pre-empted, concluded that the result is mandated by the express terms of § 18(b) of the OSH Act and that the scope of pre-emption is also defined by the statutory text. Such a finding is not contrary to the longstanding rule that this Court will not infer pre-emption of the States' historic police powers absent a clear statement of intent by Congress. Unartful though § 18(b)'s language may be, its structure and language, in conjunction with subsections (a), (c), and (f), leave little doubt that in the OSH Act Congress intended to pre-empt supplementary state regulation of an occupational safety and health issue with respect to which a federal standard exists. Pp. 109, 111-113.

When the existence of pre-emption is evident from the statutory text, our inquiry must begin and end with the statutory framework itself. ... A finding of express pre-emption in this case is not contrary to our longstanding rule that we will not infer pre-emption of the States' historic police powers absent a clear statement of intent by Congress. Rice v. Santa Fe Elevator Corp., 331 U.S. at 230; Jones v. Rath Packing Co., 430 U.S. 519, 525, 51 L. Ed. 2d 604, 97 S. Ct. 1305 (1977); English, 496 U.S. at 79. Though most statutes creating express pre-emption contain an explicit statement to that effect, a statement admittedly lacking in § 18(b), we have never required any particular magic words in our express pre-emption cases. Our task in all pre-emption cases is to enforce the "clear and manifest purpose of Congress." Rice v. Santa Fe Elevator Corp., 331 U.S. at 230. We have held, in express pre-emption cases, that Congress' intent must be divined from the language, structure, and purposes of the statute as a whole. Ingersoll-Rand Co. v. McClendon, 498 U.S. 133, 138, 112 L. Ed. 2d 474, 111 S. Ct. 478 (1990); Pilot Life Ins. Co. v. Dedeaux, 481 U.S. 41, 51, 95 L. Ed. 2d 39, 107 S. Ct. 1549 (1987). The language of the OSH statute sets forth a scheme in light of which the provisions of § 18 must be interpreted, and from which the express pre-emption that displaces state law follows.

== Dissent ==
Justice Souter, writing for a four Justice minority, felt state law was not preempted. Though he agreed with Justice O'Connor that there were three categories of preemption (express, field, and conflict) he believed that congress must "unmistakably ordain" to preempt state law. He felt that state law would not interfere enough with the federal regulatory scheme to qualify as an obstacle to the full purpose and effect of federal law.

He felt the majority's strongest argument was that the regulations contained a "saving clause" which stated that any issues not spoken on were not preempted. The majority interpreted this clause to mean that Congress had assumed that issues that were spoken on were preempted. In Souter's opinion, this inference was not necessary. Finally, he stated that the requirement that state regulatory plans be submitted for approval does not indicate that an area is preempted. All that this requirement meant is that in areas which are preempted, the state must submit a plan to overcome that preemption.

Our cases recognize federal pre-emption of state law in three variants: express pre-emption, field pre-emption, and conflict pre-emption. Express pre-emption requires "explicit pre-emptive language." See Pacific Gas & Elec. Co. v. State Energy Resources Conservation and Development Comm'n, 461 U.S. 190, 203, 75 L. Ed. 2d 752, 103 S. Ct. 1713 (1983), citing Jones v. Rath Packing Co., 430 U.S. 519, 525, 51 L. Ed. 2d 604, 97 S. Ct. 1305 (1977). Field pre-emption is wrought by a manifestation of congressional intent to occupy an entire field such that even without a federal rule on some particular matter within the field, state regulation on that matter is pre-empted, leaving it untouched by either state or federal law. 461 U.S. at 204. Finally, there is conflict pre-emption in either of two senses. The first is found when compliance with both state and federal law is impossible, ibid., the second when a state law "stands as an obstacle to the accomplishment and execution of the full purposes and objectives of Congress," Hines v. Davidowitz, 312 U.S. 52, 67, 85 L. Ed. 581, 61 S. Ct. 399 (1941).

== See also ==
- US labor law
- National Solid Wastes Management Association
