= Wyeth v. Levine =

- Supreme Court of the United States

Argued November 3, 2008 Decided March 4, 2009
- Full case name: Wyeth, Petitioner v. Diana Levine
- Docket no.: 06-1249
- Citations: 555 U.S. 555 (more) 129 S. Ct. 1187; 173 L. Ed. 2d 51; 2009 U.S. LEXIS 1774

Case history
- Prior: Judgment for plaintiff, Washington Superior Court, Vermont (2004); affirmed, 944 A.2d 179 (Vt. 2006); cert. granted, 552 U.S. 1161 (2008).

Holding
- Federal law does not pre-empt Levine's claim that Phenergan's label did not contain an adequate warning about the IV-push method of administration. Supreme Court of Vermont affirmed.

Court membership
- Chief Justice John Roberts Associate Justices John P. Stevens · Antonin Scalia; Anthony Kennedy · David Souter; Clarence Thomas · Ruth Bader Ginsburg; Stephen Breyer · Samuel Alito

Case opinions
- Majority: Stevens, joined by Kennedy, Souter, Ginsburg, Breyer
- Concurrence: Breyer
- Concurrence: Thomas (in judgment)
- Dissent: Alito, joined by Roberts, Scalia

Wyeth v. Levine, 555 U.S. 555 (2009), is a United States Supreme Court case holding that Federal regulatory approval of a medication does not shield the manufacturer from liability under state law.

== Facts ==
=== Vermont jury trial ===
The plaintiff lost her forearm to gangrene when she was injected with Phenergan, an anti-nausea drug made by Wyeth Pharmaceuticals. She won a jury verdict in Vermont, under the theory (inter alia) that Wyeth had inadequately labeled the drug.

=== Phenergan's regulatory background ===
The trial record shows that the FDA first cleared injectable Phenergan for use in 1955. In 1973 and 1976, Wyeth submitted supplemental new drug applications, which the agency cleared after proposing labeling changes. Wyeth submitted a third supplemental application in 1981 in response to a new FDA rule governing drug labels. Over the next 17 years, Wyeth and the FDA intermittently corresponded about Phenergan's label. The most notable activity occurred in 1987, when the FDA suggested different warnings about the risk of arterial exposure, and in 1988, when Wyeth submitted revised labeling incorporating the proposed changes. The FDA did not respond. Instead, in 1996, it requested from Wyeth the labeling then in use and, without addressing Wyeth's 1988 submission, instructed it to "retain verbiage in [the] current label" regarding intra-arterial injection. After a few further changes to the labeling not related to intra-arterial injection, the FDA cleared Wyeth's 1981 application in 1998, instructing that Phenergan's final printed label "must be identical" to the approved package insert.

=== Wyeth's motion for judgment as a matter of law ===
Wyeth argued that this Vermont law was federally preempted because it was in "actual conflict [with] a specific FDA order" regarding drug labeling. The trial court rejected this argument, as did the Supreme Court of Vermont, holding that the FDA requirements merely provide a floor, not a ceiling, for state regulation. The Supreme Court granted certiorari.

== Issue ==
If a drug meets the labeling requirements of the FDA, does that give rise to federal preemption of state law regarding inadequate labeling? Wyeth presented two arguments in favor of FDA Preemption:

1. It is impossible for Wyeth to comply with both the state-law duties and federal labeling regulations, see Fidelity Fed. Sav. & Loan Assn. v. De la Cuesta, since the latter forbids it from changing its label without FDA approval.
2. Permitting states to require stronger warnings creates an unacceptable "obstacle to the accomplishment and execution of the full purposes and objectives of Congress," Hines v. Davidowitz, because it substitutes a lay jury's decision about drug labeling for the expert judgment that Congress sought to entrust with drug labeling decisions when it created the FDA.

== Holding ==
Justice John Paul Stevens, writing on behalf of a 6-3 court, rejected both of Wyeth's arguments. In other words, the Vermont law was not preempted (or overruled) by FDA regulations; thus, the plaintiff could argue her case before a state court jury.

In 2019, the issue was revisited in Merck Sharp and Dohme Corp. v. Albrecht. The Supreme Court found in that case that the appellant had demonstrated sufficient evidence to prove that the FDA had considered and rejected, and thus preempted, an addition to a warning label for Fosamax.

== Reasoning ==
Questions of federal preemption "must be guided by two cornerstones of our pre-emption jurisprudence":

- "First, 'the purpose of Congress is the ultimate touchstone in every pre-emption case.' Medtronic, Inc. v. Lohr, 518 U.S. 470, 485 (1996) (internal quotation marks omitted); see Retail Clerks v. Schermerhorn, 375 U.S. 96, 103 (1963)."
- "Second, '[i]n all pre-emption cases, and particularly in those in which Congress has "legislated in a field which the States have traditionally occupied, [we] start with the assumption that the historic police powers of the States were not to be superseded by the Federal Act unless that was the clear and manifest purpose of Congress." ' Lohr, 518 U.S., at 485 (quoting Rice v. Santa Fe Elevator Corp., 331 U.S. 218 230 (1947))"

In its first argument, Wyeth is incorrect that relabeling the drug to conform to Vermont law would necessarily have violated federal labeling regulations.

- Although a manufacturer generally needs FDA approval before changing a drug label, the agency's "changes being effected" (CBE) regulation permits certain unilateral labeling changes that improve drug safety. Wyeth's misreading of this regulation is based on the misunderstanding that the FDA, rather than the manufacturer, bears primary responsibility for drug labeling. It is a central premise of the Food, Drug, and Cosmetic Act (FDCA) and the FDA's regulations that the manufacturer bears responsibility for the content of its label at all times. Pp. 11–16.

In its second argument, Wyeth is incorrect that permitting states to require stronger warnings would interfere with Congress' purpose of entrusting an expert agency with drug labeling decisions because it was not Congress's intent, in writing the Food, Drug, and Cosmetic Act, to preempt state-law failure to warn actions.

- Wyeth's argument misconstrues the intent of congress behind the FDCA. Congress did not intend the FDCA to pre-empt state-law failure-to-warn actions.
- Wyeth's argument also misconstrues the capacity of agencies to preempt state law, as Wyeth's argument relies on the preamble to a 2006 FDA regulation declaring that state-law failure-to-warn claims threaten the FDA's statutorily prescribed role. Although an agency regulation with the force of law can pre-empt conflicting state requirements, this case involves no such regulation but merely an agency's assertion that state law is an obstacle to achieving its statutory objectives. Where, as here, Congress has not authorized a federal agency to pre-empt state law directly, the weight this Court accords the agency's explanation of state law's impact on the federal scheme depends on its thoroughness, consistency, and persuasiveness, e.g. Skidmore v. Swift & Co., 323 U. S. 134. Under this standard, the FDA's 2006 preamble does not merit deference: It is inherently suspect in light of the FDA's failure to offer interested parties notice or opportunity for comment on the pre-emption question; it is at odds with the available evidence of Congress' purposes; and it reverses the FDA's own longstanding position that state law is a complementary form of drug regulation without providing a reasoned explanation.

=== Concurrence ===
Justice Breyer noted that, while the issue was not present here, the FDA may create regulations that pre-empt state law tort claims.

=== Concurrence only in judgment ===
Justice Clarence Thomas wrote separately, concurring only in the judgment. He criticized the majority for implicitly endorsing a "far-reaching implied pre-emption doctrine" where the Court can invalidate state laws based on perceived conflicts with federal statutes by extrapolating from evidence not found in the text of the statute.

== Dissent ==
Justice Samuel Alito dissented and was joined by Chief Justice John G. Roberts and Justice Antonin Scalia. He disagreed with the Court's holding that a jury, rather than the FDA, is ultimately responsible for regulating warning labels for prescription drugs. He argued this is incompatible with Geier v. American Honda Motor Co., which established the principles of conflict preemption.

== See also ==
- Bruesewitz v. Wyeth (2011)
- Riegel v. Medtronic, Inc. (2008)
- FDA Preemption
