= English v. General Electric Co. =

English v. General Electric
- Supreme Court of the United States

Argued April 25, 1990 Decided June 4, 1990
- Full case name: Vera M. English v. General Electric Company
- Citations: 496 U.S. 72 (more) 110 S. Ct. 2270; 110 L. Ed. 2d 65; 1990 U.S. LEXIS 2892; 58 U.S.L.W. 4679; 115 Lab. Cas. (CCH) ¶ 56,262; 5 I.E.R. Cas. (BNA) 609; 14 OSHC (BNA) 1609; 113 P.U.R.4th 97

Case history
- Prior: 871 F.2d 22 (reversed and remanded)

Holding
- A state-law claim for intentional infliction of emotional distress is not pre-empted by the Energy Reorganization Act of 1974.

Court membership
- Chief Justice William Rehnquist Associate Justices William J. Brennan Jr. · Byron White; Thurgood Marshall · Harry Blackmun; John P. Stevens · Sandra Day O'Connor; Antonin Scalia · Anthony Kennedy

Case opinion
- Majority: Blackmun, joined by unanimous

Laws applied
- Energy Reorganization Act of 1974, 42 U.S.C.S. § 5851(a)

English v. General Electric, 496 U.S. 72 (1990), was a United States Supreme Court case in which the Court held that state-law claim for intentional infliction of emotional distress is not pre-empted by the Energy Reorganization Act of 1974.

== Background ==
Petitioner English, a laboratory technician at a nuclear facility operated by respondent General Electric Company (GE), complained to GE's management and to the Federal Government about several perceived violations of nuclear-safety standards at the facility, including the failure of her co-workers to clean up radioactive spills in the laboratory. Frustrated by GE's failure to address her concerns, English on one occasion deliberately failed to clean a work table contaminated with uranium during an earlier shift. Instead, she outlined the contaminated areas with red tape to make them conspicuous and, a few days later, called her supervisor's attention to the fact that the marked-off areas still had not been cleaned. Shortly after work was halted for inspection and cleaning of the laboratory, GE charged English with a knowing failure to clean up radioactive contamination, temporarily assigned her to other work, and ultimately discharged her. She then filed a complaint with the Secretary of Labor, alleging that GE's actions violated 210(a) of the Energy Reorganization Act of 1974, which makes it unlawful for a nuclear industry employer to retaliate against an employee for reporting safety violations. Although an Administrative Law Judge (ALJ) found a 210(a) violation, the Secretary dismissed the complaint as untimely under the 30-day limitations period provided by 210(b)(1). Subsequently, English filed a diversity action seeking compensatory and punitive damages from GE in the District Court, raising, inter alia, a state-law claim for intentional infliction of emotional distress. While rejecting GE's argument that the latter claim fell within a field - nuclear safety - that had been completely pre-empted by the Federal Government, the court nevertheless dismissed the claim on the ground that it conflicted with three particular aspects of 210 and was therefore pre-empted. The Court of Appeals affirmed.

== Held ==
English's state-law claim for intentional infliction of emotional distress is not pre-empted by federal law. pp. 78–90.

(a) The claim is not barred on a field pre-emption theory. After reviewing the relevant statutory provisions and legislative history, the Court in Pacific Gas & Electric Co. v. State Energy Resources Conservation and Development Comm'n, 461 U.S. 190, concluded that "the Federal Government has occupied the entire field of nuclear safety concerns," id., at 212, and expressed the view that Congress intended that only the "Government should regulate the radiological safety aspects involved in the construction and operation of a nuclear plant," id., at 205. English's action, however, does not fall within the boundaries of the pre-empted field as so defined, since the state tort law at issue is not motivated by safety concerns, see id., at 213, and since the claim's actual effect on the nuclear safety decisions made by those who build and run nuclear facilities is not sufficiently direct and substantial, cf. Silkwood v. Kerr-McGee Corp., 464 U.S. 238. It is thus not surprising that there is no evidence of the necessary "clear and manifest" intent by Congress to pre-empt such claims. pp. 80–86.

(b) English's claim does not conflict with particular aspects of 210. First, neither the text nor the legislative history of 210(g) - which provides that "Subsection (a) of this section [the prohibition on employer retaliation] shall not apply" where an employee "deliberately causes a violation of any requirement of this Act or the Atomic Energy Act" - reflects a congressional desire to preclude all relief, including state remedies, to a whistle-blower who deliberately commits a safety violation. Even if that were Congress' intent, the federal interest would be served by pre-empting recovery by violators of safety standards. Here, the ALJ found that English did not deliberately commit a violation. Second, absent some specific suggestion in the text or legislative history, the failure of 210 to provide general authorization for the Secretary to award punitive damages for 210(a) violations does not imply a congressional intent to bar a state action, like English's, that permits such an award. Third, the expeditious timeframes provided for the processing of 210 claims do not reflect a congressional decision that, in order to encourage the reporting of safety violations and retaliatory behavior, no whistle-blower should be able to recover under any other law after the time for filing under 210 has expired. Since many retaliatory incidents are a response to safety complaints made to the Federal Government, the Government is already aware of these safety violations even if employees do not invoke 210's remedial provisions. Moreover, the suggestion that employees will forgo their 210 options and rely solely on state remedies is simply too speculative a basis on which to rest a pre-emption finding. pp. 87–90.

=== Summary of preemption law ===
The court provided a summary of preemption law.

=== Excerpt (summary of preemption law) ===
Our cases have established that state law is pre-empted under the Supremacy Clause, U.S. Const., Art. VI, cl. 2, in three circumstances. First, Congress can define explicitly the extent to which its enactments pre-empt state law. See Shaw v. Delta Air Lines, Inc., 463 U.S. 85, 95-98, 103 S.Ct. 2890, 2898-2900, 77 L.Ed.2d 490 (1983). Pre-emption fundamentally is a question of congressional intent, see Schneidewind v. ANR Pipeline Co., 485 U.S. 293, 299, 108 S.Ct. 1145, 1150, 99 L.Ed.2d 316 (1988), and when Congress has made its intent known through explicit statutory language, the courts' task is an easy one.

Second, in the absence of explicit statutory language, state law is pre-empted where it regulates conduct in a field that Congress intended the Federal Government to occupy exclusively. Such an intent may be inferred from a "scheme of federal regulation . . . so pervasive as to make reasonable the inference that Congress left no room for the States to supplement it," or where an Act of Congress "touch[es] a field in which the federal interest is so dominant that the federal system will be assumed to preclude enforcement of state laws on the same subject." Rice v. Santa Fe Elevator Corp., 331 U.S. 218, 230, 67 S.Ct. 1146, 1152, 91 L.Ed. 1447 (1947). Although this Court has not hesitated to draw an inference of field pre-emption where it is supported by the federal statutory and regulatory schemes, it has emphasized: "Where . . . the field which Congress is said to have pre-empted" includes areas that have "been traditionally occupied by the States," congressional intent to supersede state laws must be " 'clear and manifest.' " Jones v. Rath Packing Co., 430 U.S. 519, 525, 97 S.Ct. 1305, 1309, 51 L.Ed.2d 604 (1977), quoting Rice v. Santa Fe Elevator Corp., 331 U.S., at 230, 67 S.Ct., at 1152.

Finally, state law is pre-empted to the extent that it actually conflicts with federal law. Thus, the Court has found pre-emption where it is impossible for a private party to comply with both state and federal requirements, see, e.g., Florida Lime & Avocado Growers, Inc. v. Paul, 373 U.S. 132, 142-143, 83 S.Ct. 1210, 1217-1218, 10 L.Ed.2d 248 (1963), or where state law "stands as an obstacle to the accomplishment and execution of the full purposes and objectives of Congress." Hines v. Davidowitz, 312 U.S. 52, 67, 61 S.Ct. 399, 404, 85 L.Ed. 581 (1941). See also Maryland v. Louisiana, 451 U.S. 725, 747, 101 S.Ct. 2114, 2129, 68 L.Ed.2d 576 (1981).
