= Kurns v. Railroad Friction Products Corp. =

- Supreme Court of the United States

Argued November 9, 2011 Decided February 29, 2012
- Full case name: Gloria Gail Kurns, Executrix of the Estate of George M. Corson, Deceased, et al. v. Railroad Friction Products Corp. et al.
- Docket no.: 10-879
- Citations: 565 U.S. 625 (more) 132 S. Ct. 1261; 182 L. Ed. 2d 116

Case history
- Prior: Affirmed, 620 F.3d 392 (3d Cir. 2010); cert. granted, 563 U.S. 999 (2011)

Holding
- The state-law design-defect and failure-to-warn claims of this case fell within the field of locomotive equipment regulation preempted by the LIA, as that field was defined in Napier v. Atlantic Coast Line R. Co..

Court membership
- Chief Justice John Roberts Associate Justices Antonin Scalia · Anthony Kennedy; Clarence Thomas · Ruth Bader Ginsburg; Stephen Breyer · Samuel Alito; Sonia Sotomayor · Elena Kagan

Case opinions
- Majority: Thomas, joined by Roberts, Scalia, Kennedy, Alito, Kagan
- Concurrence: Kagan
- Concur/dissent: Sotomayor, joined by Ginsburg, Breyer

Laws applied
- Locomotive Inspection Act

Kurns v. Railroad Friction Products Corp., 565 U.S. 625 (2012), was a United States Supreme Court case in which the Court held that state-law design-defect and failure-to-warn claims arising from a railroad worker's exposure to asbestos in locomotive parts fell within the field of locomotive-equipment regulation preempted by the Locomotive Inspection Act, as that field was defined in Napier v. Atlantic Coast Line R. Co. (1926).

Justice Clarence Thomas wrote for a six-justice majority. Justice Elena Kagan concurred, and Justice Sonia Sotomayor, joined by two other justices, concurred in the judgment on the design-defect claims but dissented on the failure-to-warn claims.

== Background ==
George Corson worked as a welder and machinist for a railroad carrier. After retirement, Corson was diagnosed with mesothelioma. His wife and he sued Railroad Friction Products Corporation and Viad Corporation in state court, claiming injury from Corson's exposure to asbestos in locomotives and locomotive parts distributed by respondents. The Corsons alleged state-law claims of defective design and failure to warn of the dangers posed by asbestos. After Corson died, Kurns was substituted as a party as the executrix of his estate. The corporations removed the case to the federal District Court, which granted them summary judgment, ruling that the state-law claims were preempted by the Locomotive Inspection Act (LIA), 49 U. S. C. §20701. The Third Circuit Court of Appeals affirmed.

== Opinion of the Court ==
Writing for a six-justice majority, Justice Clarence Thomas held that the petitioners' state-law claims for defective design and failure to warn were preempted because they fell within the field of locomotive-equipment regulation occupied by the LIA. The Court treated the case as one of field preemption, in which state law is displaced when a federal statute's scope indicates that Congress intended federal law to occupy a field exclusively.

The Court found the question controlled by Napier v. Atlantic Coast Line R. Co. (1926), which had held that the LIA occupied "the entire field of regulating locomotive equipment" and defined that field by the physical elements affected rather than the purpose of the regulation. Because the petitioners' claims were directed at the equipment of locomotives, they fell within the preempted field. The Court rejected the arguments that repair-and-maintenance or failure-to-warn claims lay outside the field, reasoning that a failure-to-warn claim alleges the product itself is defective without adequate warnings and so is likewise directed at the equipment. It also held that the field extended to state common-law duties, and that neither the later Federal Railroad Safety Act nor the fact that manufacturers were not directly regulated narrowed Napier's scope.

=== Concurrence ===
Justice Elena Kagan joined the majority in full but wrote separately. She agreed that Napier governed under stare decisis while doubting the Court would decide it the same way today, calling it "an anachronism" under modern preemption law. She agreed that failure-to-warn claims were preempted, reasoning that an agency empowered to prohibit equipment may also condition its use on warnings.

=== Concurrence and dissent ===
Justice Sonia Sotomayor, joined by Justices Ruth Bader Ginsburg and Stephen Breyer, concurred in the judgment as to the design-defect claims but dissented as to the failure-to-warn claims. Accepting Napier under statutory stare decisis, she argued that the preempted field concerned the physical composition of locomotive equipment, and that failure-to-warn claims rest on a different theory that does not implicate a product's physical composition, so they should escape preemption.

== Significance ==
Kurns reaffirmed Napier v. Atlantic Coast Line R. Co. as the controlling authority on field preemption under the Locomotive Inspection Act and extended its reach to state common-law tort duties, foreclosing design-defect and failure-to-warn suits against makers of locomotive parts. The decision left a tension noted by four justices: while Napier's inference of field preemption is difficult to reconcile with modern preemption doctrine, statutory stare decisis preserves it unless Congress acts.
