= ERISA reimbursement =

In the United States, ERISA reimbursement refers to the efforts of an ERISA Plan administrator (an insurer) to obtain repayment from an insured person who had previously received payments for personal injury medical bills.

When an insurer pays an injury claim to someone, the insurer can seize cash settlements from whoever caused the injury. This “right of reimbursement” is essentially a subrogation claim. Although there are subtle legal distinctions between “subrogation” and “reimbursement,” these devices are essentially the same.

Historically, subrogation actions were limited at common law to matters involving property damage claims, with subrogation on personal injury claims being specifically prohibited. Authority for “ERISA reimbursement" claims is attributed to federal preemption under the auspices of ERISA which was enacted in 1974. At the time ERISA was enacted by the US Congress, however, subrogation for health insurers was uniformly prohibited in the United States. Such claims were deemed unlawful in all jurisdictions.

The first reported judicial decision involving an effort of a health insurer to seek subrogation on a personal injury claim is the 1982 decision in Frost v. Porter Leasing Corp., 436 N.E.2d 387 (Mass. 1982) in which subrogation was denied. “ERISA reimbursement” claims began arising in the late 1980s and have been resisted by some federal courts.

According to industry statistics, ERISA plans and related insurers are collecting close to $1 billion per year through the seizure of tort recoveries or other contractual payments received by insured personal injury victims. The plans tend to pursue reimbursement on a "first dollar priority" basis in order to maintain steady insurance premiums for their members.
