= Eli Lilly & Co. v. Medtronic, Inc. =

- Supreme Court of the United States

Argued February 26, 1990 Decided June 18, 1990
- Full case name: Eli Lilly and Company v. Medtronic, Inc.
- Docket no.: 89-243
- Citations: 496 U.S. 661 (more) 110 S. Ct. 2683; 110 L. Ed. 2d 605; 1990 U.S. LEXIS 3184; 58 U.S.L.W. 4838; 15 U.S.P.Q.2d (BNA) 1121

Case history
- Prior: Judgment for plaintiff, 696 F. Supp. 1033 (E.D. Pa. 1988); reversed, 872 F.2d 402 (Fed. Cir. 1989); rehearing en banc denied, 879 F.2d 849 (Fed. Cir. 1989); cert. granted, 493 U.S. 889 (1989).
- Subsequent: Rehearing Denied, August 14, 1990, 1990 U.S. LEXIS 3730; remanded to District Court, 915 F.2d 670 (1990).

Holding
- Section 271(e)(1) exempts from infringement the use of patented inventions reasonably related to the development and submission of information needed to obtain marketing approval of medical devices under the FDCA.

Court membership
- Chief Justice William Rehnquist Associate Justices William J. Brennan Jr. · Byron White; Thurgood Marshall · Harry Blackmun; John P. Stevens · Sandra Day O'Connor; Antonin Scalia · Anthony Kennedy

Case opinions
- Majority: Scalia, joined by Rehnquist, Brennan, Marshall, Blackmun, Stevens
- Dissent: Kennedy, joined by White
- O'Connor took no part in the consideration or decision of the case.

Laws applied
- 35 U.S.C. § 271

Eli Lilly and Company v. Medtronic, Inc., 496 U.S. 661 (1990), is a United States Supreme Court case related to patent infringement in the medical device industry. It held that 35 U.S.C. § 271(e)(1) of United States patent law exempted premarketing activity conducted to gain approval of a device under the Federal Food, Drug, and Cosmetic Act from a finding of infringement.

== See also ==
- Medtronic, Inc. v. Lohr (1996)
- Riegel v. Medtronic, Inc. (2008)
- List of United States Supreme Court cases, volume 496
