= Gasperini v. Center for Humanities, Inc. =

Gasperini v. Center for Humanities
- Supreme Court of the United States

Argued April 16, 1996 Decided June 24, 1996
- Full case name: William Gasperini v. Center for Humanities, Inc.
- Citations: 518 U.S. 415 (more) 116 S. Ct. 2211; 135 L. Ed. 2d 659; 1996 U.S. LEXIS 4051

Case history
- Prior: Judgment for plaintiff, S.D.N.Y.; vacated and remanded for new trial, 66 F.3d 427 (2nd Cir. 1995)
- Subsequent: On remand, judgment for plaintiff (remittitur); affirmed in part, 149 F.3d 137 (2nd Cir. 1998)

Holding
- The federal trial court should apply the state law standard for excessiveness of a jury award. The appeals court should not apply the standard due to the Seventh Amendment.

Court membership
- Chief Justice William Rehnquist Associate Justices John P. Stevens · Sandra Day O'Connor; Antonin Scalia · Anthony Kennedy; David Souter · Clarence Thomas; Ruth Bader Ginsburg · Stephen Breyer

Case opinions
- Majority: Ginsburg, joined by O'Connor, Kennedy, Souter, and Breyer
- Dissent: Stevens
- Dissent: Scalia, joined by Rehnquist, and Thomas

Laws applied
- U.S. Const. amend. VII; N.Y. Civ. Prac. Law and Rules (CPLR) §5501(c) (1995).

Gasperini v. Center for Humanities, 518 U.S. 415 (1996), was a decision by the Supreme Court of the United States in which the Court further refined the Erie doctrine regarding when and how federal courts are to apply state law in cases brought under diversity jurisdiction. The Court held that the New York state rule applied.

== Background of the case ==
The plaintiff, William Gasperini, was an American journalist and photographer for CBS News and the Christian Science Monitor who, during the course of seven years in Central America, took over 5,000 slide transparencies depicting war, political leaders and everyday life. In 1990, Gasperini supplied 300 of his original transparencies to The Center for Humanities for use in an educational video. The center agreed to return the transparencies, but they were lost. Gasperini commenced suit in the United States District Court for the Southern District of New York, invoking diversity jurisdiction. The trial jury applied New York law and found for Gasperini, awarding him $450,000 in compensatory damages. The defendant moved for a new trial, asserting, among other things, excessiveness of the award. The district court dismissed the motion and the defendant appealed. The United States Court of Appeals for the Second Circuit vacated the judgment and remanded for a new trial, unless the plaintiff accepted a remittitur for $100,000. Gasperini petitioned and the Supreme Court granted certiorari.

== Issue ==
The case involved an important issue of what standard of review should be used by a federal court in measuring the excessiveness of a jury verdict. The standard typically applied by federal courts was that a verdict was excessive if it "shocked the conscience of the court." New York had recently enacted legislation changing the standard as a part of a tort reform initiative, codifying in CPLR §5501(c) the standard that an award was excessive if it "deviates materially from what would be reasonable compensation." The question arose as to whether the standard was substantive or procedural, as the Erie Doctrine stipulated that the federal court should apply the substantive law of the state and federal procedural law.

== The court's decision ==
Justice Ginsburg delivered the majority opinion of the Court, which held that the federal district court should apply the New York standard for excessiveness, reasoning that the case did not include a distinct choice between federal and state interests, but rather presented an opportunity to serve both interests. The New York excessiveness standard reflected the state’s substantive interest in tort reform, so the federal courts should follow it. The Seventh Amendment, which limits court review of facts tried by a jury, did not prevent application of that standard in federal court. The only federal interest was to ensure that responsibility for this review should rest primarily with the trial court, not the court of appeals. That norm was procedural, because it reflected standard practice in federal civil trials. Accordingly, the Court vacated the judgment of the Second Circuit and ordered the case remanded to the district court for a new trial so that the trial judge could test the jury's verdict against the state standard.

== See also ==
- Erie Doctrine
- List of United States Supreme Court cases, volume 518
