= Jaffee v. Redmond =

- Supreme Court of the United States

Argued February 26, 1996 Decided June 13, 1996
- Full case name: Carrie Jaffee, Special Administrator for Ricky Allen, Sr., Deceased, Petitioner v. Mary Lu Redmond and the Village of Hoffman Estates, Illinois
- Citations: 518 U.S. 1 (more) 116 S. Ct. 1923; 135 L. Ed. 2d 337; 1996 U.S. LEXIS 3879; 64 U.S.L.W. 4490; 44 Fed. R. Evid. Serv. (Callaghan) 1; 96 Cal. Daily Op. Service 4192; 96 Daily Journal DAR 6783; 9 Fla. L. Weekly Fed. S 678

Case history
- Prior: Jury verdict for petitioners reversed by Seventh Circuit.

Holding
- The Federal Rules of Evidence recognize a psychotherapist-patient evidentiary privilege that extends to licensed social workers.

Court membership
- Chief Justice William Rehnquist Associate Justices John P. Stevens · Sandra Day O'Connor; Antonin Scalia · Anthony Kennedy; David Souter · Clarence Thomas; Ruth Bader Ginsburg · Stephen Breyer

Case opinions
- Majority: Stevens, joined by O'Connor, Kennedy, Souter, Thomas, Ginsburg, Breyer
- Dissent: Scalia, joined by Rehnquist (part III)

Laws applied
- Fed. R. Evid. 501

Jaffee v. Redmond, 518 U.S. 1 (1996), was a United States Supreme Court case in which the Court created a psychotherapist-patient privilege in the Federal Rules of Evidence.

== Background ==
Mary Lu Redmond was a police officer for the Village of Hoffman Estates, Illinois. On June 27, 1991, she was the first to respond to a fight-in-progress call. She arrived to find Ricky Allen chasing another man and brandishing a butcher knife. Redmond repeatedly ordered Allen to drop the knife, but Allen ignored her. At one point in the chase, it appeared to Redmond that Allen was about to stab the man he was chasing, and so she shot Allen. Allen died at the scene.

Acting as the representative of Allen's estate, Jaffee filed suit under 42 U.S.C. § 1983, claiming that Redmond had used excessive force during the altercation. Witnesses testified that Allen was not armed during the altercation. During discovery, Jaffee discovered that Redmond had sought counseling from a licensed clinical social worker. Jaffee sought the social worker's notes for the purpose of cross-examining Redmond at the trial. Redmond opposed the request, claiming that the notes were protected by the psychotherapist-patient privilege. The trial judge rejected this argument, and the jury later awarded Allen's estate $545,000 in damages.

Redmond appealed to the Seventh Circuit, which vacated the decision of the trial court and remanded. In its opinion, the privilege of which Redmond sought to avail herself did exist in federal law, and the trial court should have applied it. Jaffee asked the Supreme Court to review the Seventh Circuit's decision, and it agreed to do so.

== Majority opinion ==
When the United States Congress enacted the Federal Rules of Evidence in 1975, it expressly left the development of evidentiary privileges to the courts. The "privilege of a witness... shall be governed by the principles of the common law as they may be interpreted... in the light of reason and experience." Under these common-law principles, the law favors compelling witnesses to give whatever evidence they can, unless there is some other "public good transcending the normally predominant principle of utilizing all rational means for ascertaining truth."

The psychotherapist-patient privilege, like the attorney–client and spousal privileges, flows from society's desire to facilitate certain relationships of confidence and trust. "Effective psychotherapy... depends upon an atmosphere of confidence and trust in which the patient is willing to make a frank and complete disclosure of facts, emotions, memories, and fears. Because of the sensitive nature of the problems for which individuals consult psychotherapists, disclosure of confidential communication made during counseling sessions may cause embarrassment or disgrace. For this reason, the mere possibility of disclosure may impede disclosure of the confidential relationship necessary for successful treatment." These are the important societal interests the psychotherapist-patient privilege works to protect.

By contrast, if there existed no privilege for communications between psychotherapists and their patients, people would decide not to seek treatment for mental illness, particularly illnesses and traumas that are likely to result in litigation. If there were no privilege, evidence such as that sought from Redmond by Allen's estate would not likely arise in the first place, and would remain out of court just as if it were privileged.

Two other considerations favored recognizing a federal psychotherapist-patient privilege. First, all 50 states recognized some form of the psychotherapist-patient privilege; thus, the "reason and experience" of those states counseled in favor of recognizing the privilege in federal courts. Indeed, as long as federal courts declined to recognize the privilege, those courts undermined the promise made by the states that afforded the privilege to their citizens. The secrets they shared with their psychologists could still be revealed to the world in federal courts housed across the street from the courts of their own states.

Second, the proposed draft of the Federal Rules of Evidence included nine specific privileges, one of which was a psychotherapist-patient privilege. In the past, the Court had rejected an attempt to create a state legislative privilege within the Federal Rules of Evidence because that privilege was not included in the draft version of the Rules. When it rejected the draft including specific privileges, Congress did not specifically intend to reject the individual privileges. It simply intended to leave the contours of the privileges to the Courts. For all these reasons, the Court held that a psychotherapist-patient privilege existed within the Federal Rules of Evidence.

The Court also had no trouble applying it to therapy provided by a licensed clinical social worker. Social workers provide a significant amount of mental health treatment. Their clients often are of modest means and cannot afford the assistance of psychiatrists and psychologists. The vast majority of states explicitly extend a testimonial privilege to social workers. Thus, the Court saw no reason to delimit the privilege so as to exclude social workers from the privilege.

== Dissenting opinion ==
Justice Scalia disputed every major logical premise on which the majority's decision rested. The heart of his dissent, however, stemmed from two basic propositions. First, that the relative social importance of psychotherapy was not established.

Effective psychotherapy undoubtedly is beneficial to individuals with mental problems, and surely serves some larger social interest in maintaining a mentally stable society. But merely mentioning these values does not answer the critical question: Are they of such importance, and is the contribution of psychotherapy to them so distinctive, and is the application of normal evidentiary rules so destructive to psychotherapy, as to justify making our federal courts occasional instruments of injustice [by excluding truthful evidence from court]?

Second, the lack of sufficient basis to distinguish psychotherapists from others in society in whom people place valuable confidences. "For most of history, men and women have worked out their difficulties by talking to... parents, siblings, best friends, and bartenders—none of whom was awarded a privilege against testifying in court." As a result, he could not see how extending an evidentiary privilege to psychotherapists would facilitate mental health treatment.

From Scalia's vantage point, two flaws in the majority's argument were most troubling. Although all states had a psychotherapist privilege as part of their law, those states had enacted the law through legislation. The majority, by contrast, was creating one judicially after Congress had expressly declined to do so. The majority's justification—that the federal privilege was necessary to avoid undermining the laws of the states—seemed to Scalia to be an inverse form of preemption.

Also, the states were not uniform in their treatment of the question presented in the case—whether the testimony of a licensed social worker should be privileged from disclosure in court. Social workers serve a variety of roles and have a variety of backgrounds and training. "Does a social worker bring to bear at least a significantly heightened degree of skill — more than a minister or rabbi, for example? I have no idea, and neither does the Court."

== See also ==
- List of United States Supreme Court cases, volume 518
- List of United States Supreme Court cases
- Lists of United States Supreme Court cases by volume
