= Napier v. Atlantic Coast Line Railroad Co. =

- Supreme Court of the United States

Decided November 29, 1926
- Full case name: Napier v. Atlantic Coast Line Railroad Co.
- Citations: 272 U.S. 605 (more)

Holding
- The Boiler Inspection Act has so occupied the field of regulating locomotive equipment on interstate highways that state legislation requiring cab curtains and automatic firebox doors is precluded and must be addressed by the Interstate Commerce Commission.

Court membership
- Chief Justice William H. Taft Associate Justices Oliver W. Holmes Jr. · Willis Van Devanter; James C. McReynolds · Louis Brandeis; George Sutherland · Pierce Butler; Edward T. Sanford · Harlan F. Stone

Case opinion
- Majority: Brandeis, joined by unanimous

Laws applied
- Boiler Inspection Act

Napier v. Atlantic Coast Line Railroad Co., 272 U.S. 605 (1926), was a United States Supreme Court case in which the court held that the Boiler Inspection Act has so occupied the field of regulating locomotive equipment on interstate highways that state legislation requiring cab curtains and automatic firebox doors is precluded and must be addressed by the Interstate Commerce Commission.

== Later developments ==
The Supreme Court returned to the Boiler Inspection Act, now renamed the Locomotive Inspection Act, in Kurns v. Railroad Friction Products Corp., a case in which the court also held that field preemption applied.
