= Denver Area Educational Telecommunications Consortium, Inc. v. FCC =

- Supreme Court of the United States

Argued February 21, 1996 Decided June 28, 1996
- Full case name: Denver Area Educational Telecommunications Consortium, Inc. v. Federal Communications Commission
- Citations: 518 U.S. 727 (more) 116 S.Ct. 2374, 135 L.Ed.2d 888
- Argument: Oral argument
- Opinion announcement: Opinion announcement

Case history
- Prior: 56 F. 3d 105 (CADC 1995)

Holding
- Sections 10(b) and 10(c) of the Cable Television Consumer Protection and Competition Act of 1992 violate the First Amendment to the United States Constitution, but section 10(a) of that act is constitutional.

Court membership
- Chief Justice William Rehnquist Associate Justices John P. Stevens · Sandra Day O'Connor; Antonin Scalia · Anthony Kennedy; David Souter · Clarence Thomas; Ruth Bader Ginsburg · Stephen Breyer

Case opinions
- Majority: Breyer (Part III), joined by Stevens, O'Connor, Kennedy, Souter, Ginsburg
- Plurality: Breyer (Parts I, II, and V), joined by Stevens, O'Connor, Souter
- Plurality: Breyer (Parts IV and VI), joined by Stevens, Souter
- Concurrence: Stevens
- Concurrence: Souter
- Concur/dissent: O'Connor
- Concur/dissent: Kennedy, joined by Ginsburg
- Concur/dissent: Thomas, joined by Rehnquist, Scalia

Denver Area Educational Telecommunications Consortium v. Federal Communications Commission, 518 U.S. 727 (1996), was a 1996 United States Supreme Court case concerning the constitutionality of certain provisions of the Cable Television Consumer Protection and Competition Act of 1992. The Court held that provisions 10(b) and 10(c) of this Act violated the First Amendment to the United States Constitution. Provision 10(b) required operators of leased access television stations to segregate "patently offensive" programming on a separate channel, to block access to that channel from viewers, and to unblock it in response to a viewer's written request. Provision 10(c) allowed the operators of public access channels to prohibit the broadcasting of programming that the operator "reasonably believes describes or depicts sexual or excretory activities or organs in a patently offensive manner". The Court also upheld section 10(a) of the same Act, which granted a similar ability as 10(c) to leased access channels rather than public access channels, as consistent with the First Amendment.

== Background ==
Congress enacted the Cable Television Consumer Protection and Competition Act of 1992 (the Act) in order to limit the availability of sexually explicit programming on cable television. The three provisions of the Act that were challenged in this case were as follows:

1. 10(a), which permits cable broadcasters on leased access channels to prohibit content that the "operator reasonably believes describes or depicts sexual or excretory activities or organs in a patently offensive manner."
2. 10(b), which requires leased access channel broadcasters to segregate and block obscene programming if they choose to permit its broadcast.
3. 10(c), which permits public access channel broadcasters to prohibit "any programming which contains obscene material, sexually explicit conduct, or material soliciting or promoting unlawful conduct."

Petitioners sought judicial review of all three of these provisions in the United States Court of Appeals for the District of Columbia Circuit. A three-judge panel agreed with the petitioners that these provisions violated the First Amendment, but on rehearing en banc, the full Court of Appeals reversed, holding that all three provisions were constitutional. Four of the eleven judges on the Court of Appeals dissented either in full or in part, stating that they would have held at least one of the provisions unconstitutional; two judges stated that they would have held all three provisions unconstitutional.

== Opinions ==
The Court's decision, announced on June 28, 1996, produced numerous fractured opinions. A total of six justices wrote opinions in this case, but only Part III of Justice Stephen Breyer's opinion commanded the support of a majority of justices, so only this part represented the opinion of the Court.

=== Justice Breyer's opinion ===
In Part III, Justice Breyer concluded that section 10(b) of the Act violates the First Amendment because it significantly restricts viewers' access to protected speech on blocked channels, and because this provision was not sufficiently narrowly tailored to the problem it was intended to address. In Parts I and II of his opinion, Justice Breyer, joined by Justices John Paul Stevens, Sandra Day O'Connor, and David Souter, concluded that section 10(a) of the Act does not violate the First Amendment. As these parts were joined by only three other justices, they represented a plurality opinion rather than the opinion of the Court, the latter of which requires endorsement from a majority of the Court's nine justices. In Part IV of his opinion, Justice Breyer concluded that 10(c) violates the First Amendment; this part was joined only by Justices Stevens and Souter.

=== Concurrences ===
Both Justice Stevens and Justice Souter filed concurring opinions, neither of which was joined by any other justice. Both justices' concurrences explained why they agreed with Justice Breyer's refusal to adopt a definite categorical rule for how the First Amendment should apply to cable television in general, in explicit contrast to Justice Anthony Kennedy, who vigorously advocated for such categorical rules for analyzing whether any law violates the First Amendment.

=== Justice Kennedy's opinion ===
Justice Kennedy authored an opinion concurring in part and dissenting in part, in which Justice Ruth Bader Ginsburg joined. Justice Kennedy argued that all three provisions of the Act violate the First Amendment and so should be struck down. Both Kennedy and Ginsburg also joined Part III of Breyer's opinion, in which he held section 10(b) unconstitutional. Kennedy did not join Part IV of Breyer's opinion because, though he agreed with its conclusion that 10(c) is unconstitutional, he would have given different reasons for this conclusion. However, the fact that both Kennedy and Ginsburg agreed that 10(c) was unconstitutional meant that, combined with the votes of Breyer, Stevens, and Souter, there were five votes for this outcome, representing a majority of the Court's justices.

=== Justice O'Connor's opinion ===
Justice O'Connor authored an opinion concurring in part and dissenting in part. She agreed with Justice Breyer that 10(a) is constitutional and that 10(b) is unconstitutional, but she would have held that 10(c) was also constitutional because of its similarities to 10(a), which she felt were more important than its differences.

=== Justice Thomas's opinion ===
Justice Clarence Thomas, joined by Chief Justice William Rehnquist and Justice Antonin Scalia, authored an opinion concurring in part and dissenting in part. These three justices would have upheld all three provisions of the Act as constitutional. Justice Thomas also criticized the plurality for not explicitly addressing what First Amendment protection applies to cable operators and consumers.
