= United States v. One Assortment of 89 Firearms =

- Supreme Court of the United States

Decided February 22, 1984
- Full case name: United States v. One Assortment of 89 Firearms
- Citations: 465 U.S. 354 (more)

Holding
- A gun owner's acquittal on criminal charges involving firearms does not preclude a subsequent in rem forfeiture proceeding against those firearms when that subsequent proceeding is civil rather than criminal.

Court membership
- Chief Justice Warren E. Burger Associate Justices William J. Brennan Jr. · Byron White; Thurgood Marshall · Harry Blackmun; Lewis F. Powell Jr. · William Rehnquist; John P. Stevens · Sandra Day O'Connor

Case opinion
- Majority: Burger, joined by unanimous

United States v. One Assortment of 89 Firearms, 465 U.S. 354 (1984), was a United States Supreme Court case in which the court held that a gun owner's acquittal on criminal charges involving firearms does not preclude a subsequent in rem forfeiture proceeding against those firearms when that subsequent proceeding is civil rather than criminal.

== Background ==
The United States has a long history of initiating civil forfeiture proceedings in parallel to criminal proceedings that are treated as unconnected to those criminal matters. This issue reached the Supreme Court several times, in cases such as Dobbins's Distillery v. United States (1877) and Various Items of Personal Property v. United States (1931). In the 1970s, Congress passed laws expanding the civil forfeiture further. In One Lot Emerald Cut Stones v. United States (1974), the court held that civil forfeiture of the emeralds was not barred by the Double Jeopardy Clause because the forfeiture proceeding was not criminal punishment. However, the court said there that a forfeiture could actually be criminal if it was not remedial in nature.

Upon trial in federal District Court, Patrick Mulcahey, who asserted the defense of entrapment, was acquitted of charges of knowingly engaging in the business of dealing in firearms without a license, in violation of 18 U.S.C. § 922(a)(1). The government then instituted an in rem action for forfeiture of the firearms involved, pursuant to 18 U.S.C. § 924(d), which authorizes forfeitures of any firearms "involved in or used or intended to be used in, any violation of the provisions of this chapter." Ordering forfeiture, the District Court rejected Mulcahey's defenses of res judicata and collateral estoppel based on his earlier acquittal. The Fourth Circuit Court of Appeals reversed, concluding that, because the § 924(d) forfeiture proceeding was criminal and punitive in nature, it was barred by double jeopardy principles in view of Mulcahey's prior acquittal. Relying on Coffey v. United States, 116 U. S. 436, the Court of Appeals also held that the forfeiture action was barred by collateral estoppel because it was based upon the same facts as the earlier criminal action.

The Supreme Court granted certiorari.

== Opinion of the court ==
The Supreme Court issued an opinion on February 22, 1984.

== Later developments ==
This case added a second step to the determination of whether a penalty is civil or criminal that continues to be used. First, per Mitchell v. Helvering, a court determines whether Congress intended for the penalty to the civil or criminal. Second, per 89 Firearms, where Congress has indicated an intention to establish a civil penalty, a court determines whether the statutory scheme is so punitive either in purpose or effect as to make it criminal punishment. This doctrine was further developed in cases such as United States v. Halper, which determined that a particular in personam penalty marked as civil was actually criminal and significantly expanded what could be considered criminal punishment. However, subsequent cases like United States v. Ursery restricted the doctrine.
