= United States v. Ursery =

- Supreme Court of the United States

Decided June 24, 1996
- Full case name: United States v. Ursery
- Citations: 518 U.S. 267 (more)

Holding
- In rem civil forfeitures are not "punishment" for purposes of the Double Jeopardy Clause.

Court membership
- Chief Justice William Rehnquist Associate Justices John P. Stevens · Sandra Day O'Connor; Antonin Scalia · Anthony Kennedy; David Souter · Clarence Thomas; Ruth Bader Ginsburg · Stephen Breyer

Case opinions
- Majority: Rehnquist, joined by O'Connor, Kennedy, Souter, Ginsburg, Breyer
- Concurrence: Kennedy
- Concurrence: Scalia (in judgment), joined by Thomas
- Concur/dissent: Stevens (in judgment)

Laws applied
- Double Jeopardy Clause

United States v. Ursery, 518 U.S. 267 (1996), was a United States Supreme Court case in which the court held that in rem civil forfeitures are not "punishment" for purposes of the Double Jeopardy Clause.

== Background ==
In No. 95-345, the government instituted civil forfeiture proceedings under 21 U.S.C. § 881(a)(7) against Ursery's house, alleging that it had been used to facilitate illegal drug transactions. Shortly before Ursery settled that claim, he was indicted, and was later convicted, of manufacturing marijuana in violation of.

In No. 95-346, the government filed a civil in rem complaint against various property seized from, or titled to, Arlt and Wren or Arlt's corporation, alleging that each item was subject to forfeiture under 18 U.S.C. § 981(a)(I)(A) because it was involved in money laundering, and to forfeiture under 21 U.S.C. § 881(a)(6) as the proceeds of a felonious drug transaction. Litigation of the forfeiture action was deferred while Arlt and Wren were prosecuted on drug and money laundering charges. After their convictions, the federal District Court granted the Government's motion for summary judgment in the forfeiture proceeding.

The Courts of Appeals reversed Ursery's conviction and the forfeiture judgment against Arlt and Wren, holding that the Double Jeopardy Clause prohibits the government from both punishing a defendant for a criminal offense and forfeiting his property for that same offense in a separate civil proceeding. The courts reasoned in part that United States v. Halper and Austin v. United States meant that, as a categorical matter, civil forfeitures always constitute "punishment" for double jeopardy purposes.

The Supreme Court consolidated the cases.

== Opinion of the court ==
The Supreme Court issued an opinion on June 24, 1996. The chief Justice Rehnquist, joined by four other Justices wrote the opinion of the court holding that civil forfeitures are not a violation of the Double Jeopardy clause if they are nonpunitive and remedial in nature. The court reversed the rulings of the Sixth and Ninth Circuit Courts of Appeal because of a long line of precedents in favor of civil forfeitures.

== See also ==
- United States v. One Assortment of 89 Firearms, another case about whether an in rem forfeiture is criminal punishment.
