= FDA preemption =

FDA preemption is the legal theory in the United States that products licensed or otherwise approved for use by the Food and Drug Administration (FDA) are exempt from various state efforts to preclude their use. It has been raised as a counter to both direct efforts to ban such products, and as a defense against tort claims regarding such products. The doctrine hinges on the assertion of Congressional intent to designate FDA as the national clearinghouse for determinations of the safety of pharmaceutical products, and the Supremacy Clause of the Constitution of the United States placing federal law over state law.

The doctrine has also been raised in connection with the growing efforts of some states to ban or severely restrict the use of the abortion drug mifepristone, in a manner contrary to the regimen set forth by FDA.

Michigan was the only state that voluntarily applied FDA preemption to its own state tort law through a regulatory compliance defense, having enacted this provision in 1995 to draw pharmaceutical companies to the state, but the law was controversial and efforts to repeal it were underway in 2009. In 2023, a bill to repeal the Michigan statute passed both houses of the Michigan state legislature, and was signed into law in December 2023.

FDA preemption has also been raised against direct efforts by states to ban disfavored FDA-licensed pharmaceutical products, as with the failed effort by the state of Massachusetts to ban opioid analgesic Zohydro.

== Relevant cases ==
- Riegel v. Medtronic, Inc. (2008): The U.S. Supreme Court ruled that manufacturers of FDA-approved devices are protected from liability under state laws.
- Wyeth v. Levine (2009): The U.S. Supreme Court ruled that Vermont tort law was not preempted.
- Mutual Pharmaceutical Co. v. Bartlett (2013): The U.S. Supreme Court ruled that generic drug manufactures cannot be held liable under state law for not adequately labeling medication when federal law prohibits them from changing the label from the original brand name drug.

== See also ==
- National Childhood Vaccine Injury Act (NCVIA)
