= United States v. Virginia =

- Supreme Court of the United States

Argued January 17, 1996 Decided June 26, 1996
- Full case name: United States v. Virginia et al.
- Citations: 518 U.S. 515 (more) 116 S. Ct. 2264; 135 L. Ed. 2d 735; 1996 U.S. LEXIS 4259; 64 U.S.L.W. 4638; 96 Cal. Daily Op. Service 4694; 96 Daily Journal DAR 7573; 10 Fla. L. Weekly Fed. S 93

Case history
- Prior: Judgment for defendants, 766 F. Supp. 1407 (W.D. Va. 1991) vacated, 976 F.2d 890 (4th Cir. 1992), certiorari denied, 508 U.S. 946 (1993), on remand, judgment for defendants, 852 F. Supp. 471 (W.D. Va. 1994), aff'd, 44 F.3d 1229 (4th Cir. 1995), motion for rehearing en banc denied, 52 F.3d 90 (4th Cir. 1995), certiorari granted 516 U.S. 910 (1995).

Holding
- Parties who seek to defend gender-based government action must demonstrate an "exceedingly persuasive justification" for that action.; Virginia's categorical exclusion of women from the educational opportunities VMI provides denies equal protection to women.; The remedy proffered by Virginia-maintain VMI as a male-only college and create VWIL as a separate program for women-does not cure the constitutional violation.

Court membership
- Chief Justice William Rehnquist Associate Justices John P. Stevens · Sandra Day O'Connor; Antonin Scalia · Anthony Kennedy; David Souter · Clarence Thomas; Ruth Bader Ginsburg · Stephen Breyer

Case opinions
- Majority: Ginsburg, joined by Stevens, O'Connor, Kennedy, Souter, Breyer
- Concurrence: Rehnquist (in judgment)
- Dissent: Scalia
- Thomas took no part in the consideration or decision of the case.

Laws applied
- U.S. Const. amend. XIV

United States v. Virginia, 518 U.S. 515 (1996), is a landmark case in which the Supreme Court of the United States struck down the long-standing male-only admission policy of the Virginia Military Institute (VMI) in a 7–1 decision. Justice Clarence Thomas, whose son was enrolled at the university at the time, recused himself.

== Majority decision ==
Writing for the majority, Justice Ruth Bader Ginsburg found that VMI had failed to show "exceedingly persuasive justification" for its sex-based admissions policy, violating the Fourteenth Amendment's Equal Protection Clause. In an attempt to satisfy equal protection requirements, the state of Virginia had proposed a parallel program for women, called the Virginia Women's Institute for Leadership (VWIL), located at Mary Baldwin College, a private liberal arts women's college.

Justice Ginsburg found, however, that the VWIL would not provide women with the same type of rigorous military training, facilities, courses, faculty, financial opportunities, and alumni reputation and connections that VMI affords male cadets, a decision evocative of Sweatt v. Painter (1950), in which the Court ruled that segregated law schools in Texas were unconstitutional, since a newly formed black law school clearly did not provide the same benefits to its students as the state's prestigious and long-maintained white law school. In her opinion, she stated: "The VWIL program is a pale shadow of VMI in terms of the range of curricular choices and faculty stature, funding, prestige, alumni support and influence."

=== Rehnquist concurrence ===
Chief Justice William Rehnquist wrote a concurrence agreeing to strike down the male-only admissions policy of the Virginia Military Institute, as violative of the Fourteenth Amendment's Equal Protection Clause. However, he declined to join the majority opinion's basis for using the Fourteenth Amendment, writing: "Had Virginia made a genuine effort to devote comparable public resources to a facility for women, and followed through on such a plan, it might well have avoided an equal protection violation." This rationale supported separate but equal facilities separated on the basis of sex: "[I]t is not the 'exclusion of women' that violates the Equal Protection Clause, but the maintenance of an all-men school without providing any—much less a comparable—institution for women ... It would be a sufficient remedy, I think, if the two institutions offered the same quality of education and were of the same overall caliber."

=== Scalia dissent ===
Justice Scalia's lone dissent argued that the standard applied by the majority was closer to a strict scrutiny standard than the intermediate scrutiny standard applied to previous cases involving equal protection based on sex. Notably, however, the opinion for the Court eschewed either standard; its language did not comport with the "important governmental interest" formula used in prior intermediate scrutiny cases. Scalia argued: "[I]f the question of the applicable standard of review for sex-based classifications were to be regarded as an appropriate subject for reconsideration, the stronger argument would be not for elevating the standard to strict scrutiny, but for reducing it to rational-basis review."

Scalia made sure to provide Ginsburg with a copy of his dissent as quickly as he could, in order for her to better respond to it in her majority opinion. Ginsburg later recalled that Scalia "absolutely ruined my weekend, but my opinion is ever so much better because of his stinging dissent".

== Aftermath ==
The senior justice in the majority, John Paul Stevens, had assigned Sandra Day O'Connor to write the opinion, but in an act of generosity, she demurred, saying, "This should be Ruth's." With the VMI decision, the high court effectively struck down any law which, as Justice Ginsburg wrote, "denies to women, simply because they are women, full citizenship stature — equal opportunity to aspire, achieve, participate in and contribute to society." Nina Totenberg, journalist and legal affairs correspondent for National Public Radio, hailed Ginsburg's majority opinion as "the jewel in the crown of Ginsburg majority opinions". Professor of Law at the Georgetown University Law Center Steve Vladeck was highly positive of the Ginsburg decision: "The majority opinion in the VMI case is perhaps the best-known and most important majority opinion Justice Ginsburg has penned in her 24 years on the Supreme Court. That case, more than any other, epitomized the justices’ effort to establish true sex equality as a fundamental constitutional norm, and its effects are continuing to reverberate today."

Following the ruling, VMI contemplated going private to exempt itself from the 14th Amendment, and thus this ruling. The Department of Defense warned the school that it would withdraw all ROTC programs from the school if this privatization took place. As a result of the DOD action, Congress amended 10 U.S.C. § 2111a, to prohibit the military from withdrawing or diminishing any ROTC program at one of the six senior military colleges, including VMI. However, VMI's Board of Visitors had already voted 9–8 to admit women and did not revisit the issue after the law was amended.

VMI was the last all-male public university in the United States. Justice Ginsburg told cadets of the Virginia Military Institute in 2018 that she knew her opinion “would make VMI a better place”. She also thought that those who were initially opposed would learn from their women classmates “how much good women could do for the institution.”

== See also ==
- Mississippi University for Women v. Hogan – 1982 case holding the Mississippi University for Women's single-sex admissions policy unconstitutional
