= List of United States Supreme Court cases, volume 518 =

This is a list of all the United States Supreme Court cases from volume 518 of the United States Reports:

Case name	Citation	Date decided
Jaffee v. Redmond	518 U.S. 1	1996
Montana v. Egelhoff	518 U.S. 37	1996
Koon v. United States	518 U.S. 81	1996
An appellate court should not review de novo a decision to depart from the Guideline sentencing range, but instead should ask whether the sentencing court abused its discretion.
Melendez v. United States	518 U.S. 120	1996
A government motion attesting to the defendant's substantial assistance in a criminal investigation and requesting that the district court depart below the minimum of the applicable Guideline sentencing range does not also authorize the court to depart below a lower statutory minimum sentence.
Leavitt v. Jane L.	518 U.S. 137	1996
Calderon v. Moore	518 U.S. 149	1996
Gray v. Netherland	518 U.S. 152	1996
Lane v. Peña	518 U.S. 187	1996
Congress has not waived the Government's sovereign immunity against monetary damages awards for § 504(a) violations.
United States v. Reorganized CF&I Fabricators of Utah, Inc.	518 U.S. 213	1996
Brown v. Pro Football, Inc.	518 U.S. 231	1996
Federal labor laws shield from antitrust attack an agreement among several employers bargaining together to implement after impasse the terms of their last best good-faith wage offer.
United States v. Ursery	518 U.S. 267	1996
Lewis v. United States	518 U.S. 322	1996
Lewis v. Casey	518 U.S. 343	1996
Gasperini v. Center for Humanities, Inc.	518 U.S. 415	1996
Medtronic, Inc. v. Lohr	518 U.S. 470	1996
United States v. Virginia	518 U.S. 515	1996
Colorado Republican Federal Campaign Committee v. FEC	518 U.S. 604	1996
The First Amendment protects independent contractors from the termination or prevention of automatic renewal of at-will government contracts in retaliation for their exercise of the freedom of speech, and the Pickering balancing test, adjusted to weigh the government's interests as contractor rather than as employer, determines the extent of that protection.
Felker v. Turpin	518 U.S. 651	1996
Board of Comm'rs, Wabaunsee Cty. v. Umbehr	518 U.S. 668	1996
O'Hare Truck Service, Inc. v. City of Northlake	518 U.S. 712	1996
Denver Area Ed. Telecommunications Consortium, Inc. v. FCC	518 U.S. 727	1996
United States v. Winstar Corp.	518 U.S. 839	1996
Pennsylvania v. Labron	518 U.S. 938	1996
