= Perez v. Campbell =

- Supreme Court of the United States

Argued January 19, 1971 Decided June 1, 1971
- Full case name: Perez et ux. v. Campbell, Superintendent, Motor Vehicle Division, Arizona Highway Department, et al.
- Citations: 402 U.S. 637 (more) 91 S. Ct. 1704; 29 L. Ed. 2d 233

Holding
- Arizona's law suspending a driver's license because he could not pay the costs associated with a traffic accident was unconstitutional due to its conflict with the federal Bankruptcy Act under the Supremacy Clause of the U.S. Constitution.

Court membership
- Chief Justice Warren E. Burger Associate Justices Hugo Black · William O. Douglas; John M. Harlan II · William J. Brennan Jr. Potter Stewart · Byron White; Thurgood Marshall · Harry Blackmun

Case opinions
- Majority: White, joined by Black, Douglas, Brennan, Marshall
- Concur/dissent: Blackmun, joined by Burger, Harlan, Stewart

Laws applied
- U.S. Const. art. VI
- This case overturned a previous ruling or rulings
- Reitz v. Mealey (1941); Kesler v. Department of Public Safety (1962)

Perez v. Campbell, 402 U.S. 637 (1971), was a case in which the Supreme Court of the United States held that Arizona's law suspending a driver's license was unconstitutional due to its conflict with the federal Bankruptcy Act under the Supremacy Clause of the Constitution.

== Background ==
The plaintiffs, Mr. Adolfo and Mrs. Emma Perez, were licensed uninsured motorists in the state of Arizona. Insurance was not required under Arizona law. Mr. Perez was involved in a traffic accident and, unable to pay the associated costs, soon filed for bankruptcy. Arizona, under its financial responsibility laws, withdrew the Perez' licenses, and the couple filed suit in district court, where their claim was denied. The Perez family's appeal to the United States Court of Appeals for the Ninth Circuit was denied, and they subsequently appealed to the United States Supreme Court, which granted certiorari.

== Opinion of the Court ==
Justice White delivered the five-justice majority opinion, which held that the Motor Vehicle Safety Responsibility Act interfered with the purpose of the Bankruptcy Act § 17, a purpose which included giving those exiting bankruptcy the chance for a "clear field for future effort, unhampered by ... pre-existing debt."

This decision overruled precedent in Keeler v. Department of Public Safety, 269 US 153 (1962) and Reitz v. Mealey, 314 US 33 (1941), stating that those rulings "have no authoritative effect to the extent they are inconsistent with the controlling principle that state legislation that frustrates the full effectiveness of federal law is invalidated by the Supremacy Clause.", and was seen as reinforcing "the Hines test", the rule specified for identifying Supremacy Clause violations in Hines v. Davidowitz (1941).

Justice Blackmun, writing for a four-member minority, concurring in part and dissenting in part, would have upheld Keeler and Reitz, suggesting that the primary purpose of the Arizona law was not bankruptcy, but motorist responsibility.
