= Rice v. Santa Fe Elevator Corp. =

- Supreme Court of the United States

Argued February 13–14, 1947 Decided May 5, 1947
- Full case name: Rice v. Santa Fe Elevator Corp.
- Citations: 331 U.S. 218 (more) 67 S. Ct. 1146; 91 L. Ed. 1447; 1947 U.S. LEXIS 2938

Case history
- Prior: Bd. of Trade of Chicago v. Illinois Commerce Commission, 156 F.2d 33 (7th Cir. 1946); cert. granted, 329 U.S. 701 (1946); cert. dismissed in part, 330 U.S. 810 (1947).

Holding
- When Congress legislates in a field which the States have traditionally occupied the Court starts with the assumption that the police powers of the States were not superseded by the federal law unless that was the clear and manifest purpose of Congress.

Court membership
- Chief Justice Fred M. Vinson Associate Justices Hugo Black · Stanley F. Reed; Felix Frankfurter · William O. Douglas; Frank Murphy · Robert H. Jackson; Wiley B. Rutledge · Harold H. Burton

Case opinions
- Majority: Douglas, joined by Vinson, Black, Reed, Murphy, Jackson, Burton
- Dissent: Frankfurter, joined by Rutledge

Laws applied
- United States Warehouse Act, Illinois Public Utilities Act, Illinois Grain Warehouse Act

Rice v. Santa Fe Elevator Corp., 331 U.S. 218 (1947), is a case dealing with "field preemption": the United States Supreme Court held that when a federal law regulates a field traditionally occupied by the states, the police powers of the States in that area of law are not necessarily preempted; Congress must also manifest a clear and manifest purpose to do so.

== Background information ==
Illinois sued several grain warehousemen for violating Illinois grain warehousing regulations. The warehouseman sued in federal court, arguing that the state regulations were preempted by a related federal law. The District Court overturned his claim, but the appellate court reversed.

The question turned on how to interpret the intention of Congress. Respondents argued that the law should be construed to mean that Illinois may not regulate subjects in any related area, even though the scope of federal regulation is not as broad as the regulatory scheme of the state and even though there is or may be no necessary conflict between what the state agency and the federal agency do. Petitioners (Illinois') argue that since the area taken over by the federal government is limited, the rest may be occupied by the States; that State regulation should not give way unless there is a precise coincidence of regulation or an irreconcilable conflict between the two.

=== State law ===
The Illinois Commerce Commission regulated grain warehouses, pursuant to the Illinois Public Utilities Act, Ill.Rev. Stats.1945, ch. 111 2/3, the Illinois Grain Warehouse Act, Ill.Rev. Stats.1945, ch. 114, §§ 189 et seq., and Art. XIII of the Illinois Constitution.

[Illinois] charged [the grain warehousemen] with discrimination in storage rates in favor of the Federal Government and its agencies and against other customers, contrary to the Public Utilities Act and the Illinois Grain Warehouse Act, Ill.Rev.Stats.1945, ch. 114, 189 et seq. It alleged that respondents were both warehousemen and dealers in grain and by reason of those dual and conflicting positions had received undue preferences and advantages to the detriment of and in discrimination against petitioners and other customers of respondents,2 all in violation of provisions of the Public Utilities Act, the Grain Warehouse Act, or the Illinois Constitution of 1870, Article XIII, Smith-Hurd Stats. It charged respondents with having failed to provide reasonable, safe, and adequate public grain warehouse service and facilities, with issuing securities, with abandoning service, and with entering into various contracts with [331 U.S. 218, 222] their affiliates without prior approval of the Commission; with rendering storage and warehousing services without having filed and published their rates; with operating without a state license; and with mixing public grain with grains of different grades-all in violation of provisions of the Public Utilities Act or the Grain Warehouse Act.

=== Federal law ===
The original U.S. Warehouse Act, as enacted in 1916 (39 Stat. 486), explicitly made federal regulation in this field subservient to state regulation.

- Section 29 provided that 'nothing in this act shall be construed to conflict with, or to authorize any conflict with, or in any way to impair or limit the effect or operation of the laws of any State relating to warehouses, warehousemen....'
- Section 6 required an applicant for a federal warehouse license to provide a bond 'to secure the faithful performance of his obligations as a warehouseman' under state as well as under federal law.

In 1931, Congress amended the act. 46 Stat. 1463.

- Section 29 now provided that although the Secretary of Agriculture 'is authorized to cooperate with State officials charged with the enforcement of State laws relating to warehouses, warehousemen', and their personnel, 'the power, jurisdiction, and authority conferred upon the Secretary of Agriculture under this act shall be exclusive with respect to all persons securing a license hereunder so long as said license remains in effect.'
- Section 6 now omitted the requirement that the bond be conditioned on compliance with requirements of state law.

== Court's decision ==
=== Settled doctrines relied upon ===
- "[S]ince warehouses engaged in the storage of grain for interstate or foreign commerce are in the federal domain, United States v. Hastings, 296 U.S. 188, Congress may, if it chooses, take unto itself all regulatory authority over them (see New York Central R. Co. v. New York & Pennsylvania Co., 271 U.S. 124 ), share the task with the States, or adopt as federal policy the state scheme of regulation. See Prudential Ins. Co. v. Benjamin, 328 U.S. 408, 430-436, 1155-1159. The question in each case is what the purpose of Congress was."(emphasis added)
- "[I]n a field which the States have traditionally occupied[, see] Munn v. Illinois, 94 U.S. 113; Davies Warehouse Co. v. Bowles, 321 U.S. 144, 148-149, 477, 478 ... we start with the assumption that the historic police powers of the States were not to be superseded by the Federal Act unless that was the clear and manifest purpose of Congress. Napier v. Atlantic Coast Line R. Co., 272 U.S. 605, 611, 209; Allen-Bradley Local v. Wisconsin Employment Relations Board, 315 U.S. 740, 749, 825.(emphasis added)
- Such a purpose may be evidenced in several ways:

1. "The scheme of federal regulation may be so pervasive as to make reasonable the inference that Congress left no room for the States to supplement it. Pennsylvania R. Co. v. Public Service Commission, 250 U.S. 566, 569, 40 S. Ct. 36, 37; Cloverleaf Butter Co. v. Patterson, 315 U.S. 148, 786." (emphasis added)
2. "Or the Act of Congress may touch a field in which the federal interest is so dominant that the federal system will be assumed to preclude enforcement of state laws on the same subject. Hines v. Davidowitz, 312 U.S. 52." (emphasis added)
3. "Likewise, the object sought to be obtained by the federal law and the character of obligations imposed by it may reveal the same purpose. Southern R. Co. v. Railroad Commission, 236 U.S. 439; Charleston & W.C.R. Co. v. Varnville Furniture Co., 237 U.S. 597, Ann.Cas.1916D, 333; New York Central R. Co. v. Winfield, 244 U.S. 147, L.R.A.1918C, 439, Ann.Cas.1917D, 1139; Napier v. Atlantic Coast Line R. Co., supra." (emphasis added)
4. "Or the state policy may produce a result inconsistent with the objective of the federal statute. Hill v. Florida, 325 U.S. 538." (emphasis added)

=== Intent of Congress ===
In this case, the Court determined that Congress's intent, when it amended § 6 and § 29 of the Act, was to eliminate the dual state and federal regulation of any warehouse that chose to obtain a federal license:

It is often a perplexing question whether Congress has precluded state action or by the choice of selective regulatory measures has left the police power of the States undisturbed except as the state and federal regulations collide. Townsend v. Yeomans, 301 U.S. 441; Kelly v. Washington, 302 U.S. 1; South Carolina State Highway Dept. v. Barnwell Bros., 303 U.S. 177, 625; Union Brokerage Co. v. Jensen, 322 U.S. 202, 152 A.L.R. 1072.

...

The amendments to § 6 and § 29, read in light of the Committee Reports, say to us in plain terms that a licensee under the Federal Act can do business "without regard to State acts"; that the matters regulated by the Federal Act cannot be regulated by the States; that, on those matters, a federal licensee (so far as his interstate or foreign commerce activities are concerned) is subject to regulation by one agency and by one agency alone. [Footnote 12] That is to say, Congress did more than make the Federal Act paramount over state law in the event of conflict. It remedied the difficulties which had been encountered in the Act's administration by terminating the dual system of regulation.

Conclusion:

The test, therefore, is whether the matter on which the State assets the right to act is in any way regulated by the Federal Act. If it is, the federal scheme prevails though it is a more modest, less pervasive regulatory plan than that of the State. By that test each of the nine matters we have listed is beyond the reach of the Illinois Commission since on each one Congress has declared its policy in the Warehouse Act. The provisions of Illinois law on those subjects must therefore give way by virtue of the Supremacy Clause. U.S.Const., Art. VI, Cl. 2.

== Dissent ==
By Mr. Justice FRANKFURTER, with whom Mr. Justice RUTLEDGE concurs ...
