= Federal preemption =

Federal supremacy

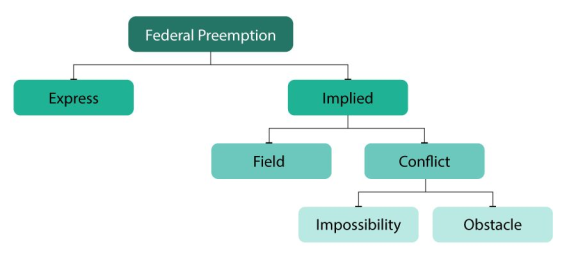
All of the kinds of federal preemption

In the law of the United States, federal preemption is the invalidation of a U.S. state law that conflicts with federal laws, treaties, or enforcement. The rules of preemption seek to restrict it to only where it is explicit or necessary. In the course of adjudicating cases, the issue of preemption may be heard in either state or federal court but is ultimately decided by the Supreme Court of the United States.

== Constitutional basis ==
According to the Supremacy Clause (Article VI, clause 2) of the United States Constitution,

This Constitution, and the Laws of the United States which shall be made in Pursuance thereof; and all Treaties made, or which shall be made, under the Authority of the United States, shall be the Supreme law of the land; and the Judges in every State shall be bound thereby, any Thing in the Constitution or Laws of any State to the Contrary notwithstanding.

As the Supreme Court stated in Altria Group v. Good, 555 U.S. 70 (2008), a federal law that conflicts with a state law will overtake, or "preempt", that state law:

Consistent with that command, we have long recognized that state laws that conflict with federal law are "without effect". Maryland v. Louisiana, 451 U. S. 725, 746 (1981)

Although many concurrent powers are subject to federal preemption, some are not, such as the power to tax private citizens.

=== Intent of Congress presumed to be deference to states ===
In Altria Group v. Good, 555 U.S. 70 (2008), the Court wrote:

When the text of a pre-emption clause is susceptible of more than one plausible reading, courts ordinarily "accept the reading that disfavors pre-emption. Bates v. Dow Agrosciences LLC, 544 U.S. 431, 449 (2005).

In Wyeth v. Levine, (2009), the Court emphasized what it called the "two cornerstones" of pre-emption jurisprudence:

First, "the purpose of Congress is the ultimate touchstone in every pre-emption case". Medtronic, Inc. v. Lohr, 518 U. S. 470, 485 (1996) (internal quotation marks omitted); see Retail Clerks v. Schermerhorn, 375 U. S. 96, 103 (1963). [Medtronic: "[O]ur analysis of the scope of the statute's pre-emption is guided by our oft-repeated comment, initially made in Retail Clerks v. Schermerhorn, 375 U.S. 96, 103, ... (1963), that 'the purpose of Congress is the ultimate touch-stone' in every pre-emption case."] Second, "[i]n all pre-emption cases, and particularly in those in which Congress has 'legislated ... in a field which the States have traditionally occupied', ... we 'start with the assumption that the historic police powers of the States were not to be superseded by the Federal Act unless that was the clear and manifest purpose of Congress'." Lohr, 518 U. S., at 485 (quoting Rice v. Santa Fe Elevator Corp., 331 U. S. 218, 230 (1947)).

See also Lorillard Tobacco Co. v. Reilly, 533 U.S. 525 (2001), at 541–542 (citation omitted):

Because "federal law is said to bar state action in [a] fiel[d] of traditional state regulation", namely, advertising, we "wor[k] on the assumption that the historic police powers of the States [a]re not to be superseded by the Federal Act unless that [is] the clear and manifest purpose of Congress.

=== Federal agency administration guiding principles ===
(Mandatory authority for independent agencies created by executive order and Cabinet departments; not binding on judicially-created tribunals; congressionally-created independent regulatory agencies are encouraged to comply)

Executive Order 13132 of August 4, 1999 – See 64 Fed. Reg. 43, 255 – August 10, 1999, Sec. 4. Special Requirements for Preemption.

Agencies, in taking action that preempts State law, shall act in strict accordance with governing law.

(a) Agencies shall construe, in regulations and otherwise, a Federal statute to preempt State law only where the statute contains an express preemption provision or there is some other clear evidence that the Congress intended preemption of State law, or where the exercise of State authority conflicts with the exercise of Federal authority under the Federal statute.

(b) Where a Federal statute does not preempt State law (as addressed in subsection (a) of this section), agencies shall construe any authorization in the statute for the issuance of regulations as authorizing preemption of State law by rulemaking only when the exercise of State authority directly conflicts with the exercise of Federal authority under the Federal statute or there is clear evidence to conclude that the Congress intended the agency to have the authority to preempt State law.

(c) Any regulatory preemption of State law shall be restricted to the minimum level necessary to achieve the objectives of the statute pursuant to which the regulations are promulgated.

(d) When an agency foresees the possibility of a conflict between State law and Federally protected interests within its area of regulatory responsibility, the agency shall consult, to the extent practicable, with appropriate State and local officials in an effort to avoid such a conflict.

(e) When an agency proposes to act through adjudication or rulemaking to preempt State law, the agency shall provide all affected State and local officials notice and an opportunity for appropriate participation in the proceedings.

== Evidence of congressional intent to preempt ==
In Altria Group v. Good, the Supreme Court reiterates that "Congress may indicate pre-emptive intent" in two ways: "through a statute's express language or through its structure and purpose. See Jones v. Rath Packing Co., 430 U. S. 519, 525 (1977)".

=== Express preemption ===
Express preemption occurs only when a federal statute explicitly confirms Congress's intention to preempt state law. English v. General Electric, 496 U.S. 72 (1990). "If a federal law contains an express pre-emption clause, it does not immediately end the inquiry because the question of the substance and scope of Congress' displacement of state law still remains." Altria Group v. Good. However, legislative preemption of federal common law does not implicate the same federalism concerns that require clear expressions of congressional intent before state law may be preempted.

=== Implied preemption ===
Implied preemption can occur in two ways: field preemption or conflict preemption. Massachusetts Association of Health Maintenance Organizations v. Ruthardt, 194 F.3d 176, 179 (1st Cir. 1999).

==== Conflict preemption ====
Under the Supremacy Clause, any state law that conflicts with a federal law is preempted. Conflict arises when it is impossible to comply with both the state and federal regulations, or the state law interposes an obstacle to the achievement of Congress's discernible objectives.

Actual conflict
A conflict exists if a party cannot comply with both state law and federal law (for example, if state law forbids something that federal law requires).
Obstacle
In addition, even in the absence of a direct conflict between state and federal law, a conflict exists if the state law is an obstacle to the accomplishment and execution of the full purposes and objectives of Congress. In Sperry v. Florida, 373 U.S. 379 (1963), the U.S. Supreme Court determined that a patent agent who was not a licensed attorney and was authorized to practice before the U.S. Patent Office pursuant to a federal statute could not be barred by Florida from continuing to practice as a patent agent in Florida, where the Florida Supreme Court determined that he was guilty of the unauthorized practice of law. The U.S. Supreme Court affirmed the constitutionality of the law authorizing the Patent Office to regulate patent agents, finding it within the scope of what was necessary and proper for Congress to exercise its authority under the Patent Clause and therefore did not violate the Tenth Amendment.
Minimum safety standard vs. uniform safety standard
Often, there may be a question of frustration of congressional purpose or the state law standing as an obstacle to congressional intent. That will raise a question of whether congressional or administrative intent in passing the law was uniformity or minimum national safety standards. Congressional intent may be to allow states to pass laws that will "establish greater safety than the minimum safety achieved by a federal regulation intended to provide a floor".
Alternatively, the purpose of a federal law could be to set a uniform national standard. This was the case in Geier v. American Honda Motor Co., where the National Traffic and Motor Vehicle Safety Act required auto manufacturers to equip a certain number of their 1987 vehicles with passive restraints. The question before the Supreme Court was whether the Act preempted state common-law tort claims saying that the auto manufacturer, although in compliance with the Act, "should nonetheless have equipped a 1987 automobile with airbags". The court indicated that, despite a savings clause, the statute "reflects a desire to subject the industry to a single, uniform set of federal safety standards. Its pre-emption of all state standards, even those that might stand in harmony with federal law, suggests an intent to avoid conflict, uncertainty, cost, and occasional risk to safety itself that too many different safety–standard cooks might otherwise create."

==== Field preemption ====
Even without a conflict between federal and state law or an express provision for preemption, the courts will infer an intention to preempt state law if the federal regulatory scheme is so pervasive as to "occupy the field" in that area of the law, i.e. to warrant an inference that Congress did not intend the states to supplement it. Gade v. National Solid Wastes Mgmt. Ass'n, 505 U.S. 88, 98 (1992). See also Rice v. Santa Fe Elevator Corp., 331 U.S. 218 (1947). For example, the courts have held that the National Labor Relations Act (NLRA) preempts state laws directed at conduct that is actually or arguably prohibited or protected by the Act or at conduct that Congress intended to leave unregulated. San Diego Building Trades Council v. Garmon, 359 U.S. 236, 244 (1959), Machinists v. Wisconsin Employment Relations Commission, 427 U.S. 132, 140–48 (1976).

=== Preemption in bankruptcy courts ===
The Bankruptcy Code, which is codified as Title 11 of the United States Code, is the uniform federal law that governs all bankruptcy cases.

There are several purposes behind the enactment of the law in its current form. The most important is a fresh start for the honest but unfortunate debtor and equality of distribution to creditors. Since state law governs most contracts, which usually form the basis for debt, there is much overlap between state laws and bankruptcy.

That overlap is ripe for preemption wherever state law interferes with either the debtor's fresh start or a creditor's right to equal distribution such as in the following examples:

- In Hawaii, a homeowner may not sue his homeowner's association (HOA) unless all fees have been paid in full. That was tremendous leverage for the HOA, but it has been recently held to be preempted. A homeowner may not sue the HOA in state court but may in bankruptcy court.
- In California, several laws, including portions of the California Constitution, have been held to be unconstitutional, such as California's one-action rule and protections given to CalPERS.

== Distinction from commandeering ==
Congress may enact federal law that supersedes, or preempts, state law, which makes it invalid. Under the Tenth Amendment, Congress may not make a law that forces a state government to take some action that it would not have otherwise taken. The distinction between commandeering and preemption was at issue in Murphy v. National Collegiate Athletic Association, 584 U.S. 453 (2018), a case in which New Jersey repealed laws criminalizing sports betting while a federal law prevented states providing that states may not "sponsor, operate, advertise, promote, license, or authorize by law or compact" sports gambling. The Supreme Court rejected the respondents' argument that the anti-authorization provision was a valid preemption of state law under the Supremacy Clause of the U.S. Constitution. The Supremacy Clause, the court pointed out, "is not an independent grant of legislative power to Congress" but "[i]nstead, it simply provides a rule of decision." For a federal provision to validly preempt state law, "it must represent the exercise of a power conferred on Congress by the Constitution[,] pointing to the Supremacy Clause will not do", and "since the Constitution confers upon Congress the power to regulate individuals, not States, [the] provision at issue must be best read as one that regulates private actors."

The Court then outlined the three types of preemption and illustrated them with cases. In Mutual Pharmaceutical Co. v. Bartlett, 570 U.S. 472 (2013), an example of conflict preemption, federal law enacted under Congress' Commerce Clause authority prohibited generic drug manufacturers from changing the composition or labeling of drugs approved by the Food and Drug Administration. Thus, state tort law could not force a generic drug manufacturer to add additional information to the FDA-approved label or hold it liable for not doing so. Express preemption "operates in essentially the same way, but this is often obscured by the language used by Congress in framing preemption provisions." The Court illustrated express preemption with Morales v. Trans World Airlines, 504 U.S. 374 (1992), concerning a provision of the Airline Deregulation Act that used language that seemed directed to the states and similar to the issue in Murphy:

[T]o ensure that the States would not undo federal deregulation with regulation of their own, the Act provided that 'no State or political subdivision thereof...shall enact or enforce any law, rule, regulation, standard, or other provision having the force and effect of law relating to rates, routes, or services of any [covered] air carrier.' This language might appear to operate directly on the States, but it is a mistake to be confused by the way in which a preemption provision is phrased. As we recently explained, we do not require Congress to employ a particular linguistic formulation when preempting state law. And if we look beyond the phrasing employed in the Airline Deregulation Act’s preemption provision, it is clear that this provision operates just like any other federal law with preemptive effect. It confers on private entities (i.e., covered carriers) a federal right to engage in certain conduct subject only to certain (federal) constraints."

The Court then explained that field preemption, the third type of preemption, occurs when federal regulation of a "'field' of regulation [is] so comprehensive[] that it has left no room for supplementary state legislation." The Court noted that even it used the same sort of abbreviated description as Congress has done in express preemption, such as involved in Morales, in a 2015 case in which the Court described field preemption: "Congress has forbidden the State to take action in the field that the federal statute pre-empts." However, "in substance, field preemption does not involve congressional commands to the States", but "like all other forms of preemption, it concerns a clash between a constitutional exercise of Congress’s legislative power and conflicting state law." The Court then explained why preemption was not applicable to the Professional and Amateur Sports Protection Act provision prohibiting states from authorizing sports betting:

In sum, regardless of the language sometimes used by Congress and this Court, every form of preemption is based on a federal law that regulates the conduct of private actors, not the States. Once this is understood, it is clear that the PASPA provision prohibiting state authorization of sports gambling is not a preemption provision because there is no way in which this provision can be understood as a regulation of private actors. It certainly does not confer any federal rights on private actors interested in conducting sports gambling operations. (It does not give them a federal right to engage in sports gambling.) Nor does it impose any federal restrictions on private actors. If a private citizen or company started a sports gambling operation, either with or without state authorization, §3702(1) would not be violated and would not provide any ground for a civil action by the Attorney General or any other party. Thus, there is simply no way to understand the provision prohibiting state authorization as anything other than a direct command to the States. And that is exactly what the anticommandeering rule does not allow.

== See also ==
- Conflict of laws in the United States – a set of doctrines for resolving horizontal conflicts between coequal state sovereigns
- Intergovernmental immunity
- Paramountcy (Canada), analogous doctrine in Canadian constitutional law
- State preemption
