= Felder v. Casey =

- Supreme Court of the United States

Argued March 28, 1988 Decided June 22, 1988
- Full case name: Bobby Felder v. Duane Casey, et al.
- Citations: 487 U.S. 131 (more) 108 S. Ct. 2302; 101 L. Ed. 2d 123

Holding
- A state notice-of-claim statute was preempted by § 1983.

Court membership
- Chief Justice William Rehnquist Associate Justices William J. Brennan Jr. · Byron White; Thurgood Marshall · Harry Blackmun; John P. Stevens · Sandra Day O'Connor; Antonin Scalia · Anthony Kennedy

Case opinions
- Majority: Brennan, joined by White, Marshall, Blackmun, Stevens, Scalia, Kennedy
- Concurrence: White
- Dissent: O'Connor, joined by Rehnquist

Laws applied
- U.S. Const. Art. VI, 42 U.S.C. § 1983

Felder v. Casey, 487 U.S. 131 (1988), was a United States Supreme Court case that held that a state notice-of-claim statute could not be applied to a civil rights suit under 42 U.S.C. § 1983 in state court.

== Background ==
A Wisconsin statute required people wishing to sue a state or local government entity or officer to give notice at least 120 days in advance of filing suit. The claimant must provide an itemized statement of the relief sought, and the lawsuit must be filed within six months of receiving notice that the claim has been disallowed. Failure to comply with the statute's requirements was grounds for dismissing the suit.

Bobby Felder, a black Milwaukee resident, alleged that he was beaten and arrested by white Milwaukee Police Department officers on July 4, 1981. Nine months later, he filed a lawsuit in Wisconsin state court against the city of Milwaukee and the police officers under 42 U.S.C. § 1983, a federal law that allows lawsuits for violations of constitutional rights. The officers moved to dismiss Felder's lawsuit because he had not complied with the state notice-of-claim statute, and on appeal the Wisconsin Supreme Court agreed that the statute applied and Felder had not adequately complied with it, so the case must be dismissed.

== Opinion of the Court ==
The Court held that Wisconsin's notice-of-claim statute was preempted because it "conflicts in both its purpose and effects with the remedial objectives of § 1983, and because its enforcement in such actions will frequently and predictably produce different outcomes in § 1983 litigation based solely on whether the claim is asserted in state or federal court." The state statute essentially imposed an exhaustion requirement, which the Court had previously held did not apply to § 1983 suits in Patsy v. Board of Regents of Florida, 457 U.S. 496 (1982).

== See also ==
- Exhaustion of remedies
