= Medtronic, Inc. v. Lohr =

- Supreme Court of the United States

Argued April 23, 1996 Decided June 26, 1996
- Full case name: Medtronic, Inc., Petitioner 95-754 v. Lora Lohr, et vir; Lora Lohr, et vir, Petitioners 95-886 v. Medtronic, Inc.
- Citations: 518 U.S. 470 (more) 116 S. Ct. 2240; 135 L. Ed. 2d 700; 1996 U.S. LEXIS 4260; 64 U.S.L.W. 4625; CCH Prod. Liab. Rep. ¶ 14,634; 29 U.C.C. Rep. Serv. 2d (Callaghan) 1077; 96 Cal. Daily Op. Service 4685; 96 Daily Journal DAR 7557; 10 Fla. L. Weekly Fed. S 83

Court membership
- Chief Justice William Rehnquist Associate Justices John P. Stevens · Sandra Day O'Connor; Antonin Scalia · Anthony Kennedy; David Souter · Clarence Thomas; Ruth Bader Ginsburg · Stephen Breyer

Case opinions
- Majority: Stevens, joined by Kennedy, Souter, Ginsburg, Breyer (parts I, II, III, V, VII); Kennedy, Souter, Ginsburg (parts IV, VI)
- Concurrence: Breyer
- Concur/dissent: O'Connor, joined by Rehnquist, Scalia, Thomas

Medtronic, Inc. v. Lohr, 518 U.S. 470 (1996), is a United States Supreme Court case dealing with the scope of federal preemption.

It was later limited by Riegel v. Medtronic, Inc.

== See also ==
- Eli Lilly & Co. v. Medtronic, Inc.
- List of United States Supreme Court cases, volume 518
