= National Waste & Recycling Association =

- Formation: 1962
- Type: Trade association
- Purpose: Advocacy, representation and service to private sector waste and recycling companies in the United States as well as the firms that service those companies.
- Headquarters: Washington, D.C.
- Region served: United States
- Members: Companies that collect and manage municipal solid waste, recycling and biomedical waste; waste equipment manufacturers and distributors; and other service providers who serve those businesses.
- Chairman: Don Ross
- Interim President and CEO: James T. Riley, Esq.
- Website: wasterecycling.org

The National Waste & Recycling Association (NWRA) is a Washington, D.C.–based trade association that represents private waste and recycling companies, as well as manufacturers and distributors of equipment that processes the material, and service providers who serve those businesses. Its nearly 700 members are a mix of publicly traded and privately owned local, regional and Fortune 500 national and international companies. The industry's publicly traded companies are among the largest components of the Dow Jones U.S. Waste & Disposal Index (DJUSPC). NWRA represents approximately 70 percent of the private sector waste and recycling market.

NWRA has chapters in about 30 states and New York City led by its company members to lobby on state and local legislative and regulatory issues, which range from road safety rules to recycling regulation. It also lobbies the U.S. government, mainly in the areas of landfill regulation, rules regarding truck drivers, and taxes.

Association members operate in all 50 states and the District of Columbia and can be found in most, if not all, U.S. congressional districts. Waste and recycling facilities number nearly 18,000 scattered throughout the U.S., mirroring population centers.

Founded in 1962 as the National Council of Refuse Disposal Trade Associations, the current organization is the result of a merger of Environmental Industry Associations and its sub-associations, the National Solid Wastes Management Association and the Waste Equipment Technology Association that occurred in November 2013.

NWRA includes interest groups that focus on landfills, recycling, and healthcare waste businesses as well as groups for younger members and women. It offers its members advocacy, safety expertise, education, statistical research, professional development, networking opportunities, discounts on business services and communications support.

== Slow Down to Get Around ==
The “Slow Down to Get Around” program encourages motorists to drive safely and slowly around the trucks collecting the trash and recycling from bins. (Many deaths and injuries of waste collectors occur when the workers are struck by drivers speeding around their vehicles.) NWRA adopted the program and partnered with the U.S. Occupational Safety and Health Administration to create a public service announcement video. To augment this, the association lobbies individual states to pass legislation that creates a speed limit around collection vehicle or mandates that motorists move over one lane as they pass them. Such laws now exist in Alabama, Florida, Georgia, Indiana, Michigan, Virginia, West Virginia, and Wisconsin.
