= Riegel v. Medtronic, Inc. =

- Supreme Court of the United States

Argued December 4, 2007 Decided February 20, 2008
- Full case name: Charles R. Riegel, et ux. v. Medtronic, Inc.
- Docket no.: 06-179
- Citations: 552 U.S. 312 (more) 128 S. Ct. 999; 169 L. Ed. 2d 892
- Argument: Oral argument

Holding
- The MDA's pre-emption clause bars common-law claims challenging the safety or effectiveness of a medical device marketed in a form that received premarket approval from the FDA.

Court membership
- Chief Justice John Roberts Associate Justices John P. Stevens · Antonin Scalia; Anthony Kennedy · David Souter; Clarence Thomas · Ruth Bader Ginsburg; Stephen Breyer · Samuel Alito

Case opinions
- Majority: Scalia, joined by Roberts, Kennedy, Souter, Thomas, Breyer, Alito; Stevens (except Parts III–A and III–B)
- Concurrence: Stevens (in part)
- Dissent: Ginsburg

Riegel v. Medtronic, Inc., 552 U.S. 312 (2008), is a United States Supreme Court case in which the Court held that the pre-emption clause of the Medical Device Amendment bars state common-law claims that challenge the effectiveness or safety of a medical device marketed in a form that received premarket approval from the Food and Drug Administration.

It modified the rule in Medtronic, Inc. v. Lohr.

== See also ==
- Eli Lilly & Co. v. Medtronic, Inc.
- FDA Preemption
- List of United States Supreme Court cases, volume 552
