= Locomotive Inspection Act =

Locomotive Inspection Act Amendments of 1915
- Other short titles: Boiler Inspection Act Amendments of 1915
- Long title: An Act To amend an Act entitled "An Act to promote the safety of employees and travelers upon railroads by compelling common carriers engaged in interstate commerce to equip their locomotives with safe and suitable boilers and appurtenances thereto," approved February seventeenth, nineteen hundred and eleven
- Acronyms (colloquial): LIA
- Enacted by: the 63rd United States Congress
- Effective: September 4, 1915

Citations
- Public law: Public Law 63-294
- Statutes at Large: 38 Stat. 1192

Codification
- Acts amended: Boiler Inspection Act of 1911
- U.S.C. sections amended: Sections 2, 3, 4, 5, 6, 7, and 8

Legislative history
- Introduced in the House of Representatives as H.R. 17894 by William C. Adamson (D‑GA) on July 14, 1914; Committee consideration by House Committee on Interstate and Foreign Commerce; Passed the House of Representatives on June 29, 1914 (Voice vote); Passed the Senate on March 2, 1915 (Voice vote) with amendment; House of Representatives agreed to Senate amendment on March 3, 1915 (Voice vote); Signed into law by President Woodrow Wilson on March 4, 1915

United States Supreme Court cases
- Napier v. Atlantic Coast Line Railroad Co. (1926)

The Federal Boiler Inspection Act, also called the Railroad Inspection Act, expanded the Boiler Inspection Act of 1911 to include federal interstate commerce clause regulation not just of train engine boilers, but of the entire train as well as cargo to ensure safety for workers and passengers. In 1915 the Boiler Inspection Act was expanded and retitled to the Locomotive Inspection Act.
