= Maryland v. Louisiana =

- Supreme Court of the United States

Argued January 19, 1981 Decided May 26, 1981
- Full case name: Maryland v. Louisiana
- Citations: 451 U.S. 725 (more)
- Argument: Oral argument

Holding
- Louisiana's exceptions to the Special Master's recommendation that the motion to dismiss be denied are rejected.

Court membership
- Chief Justice Warren E. Burger Associate Justices William J. Brennan Jr. · Potter Stewart; Byron White · Thurgood Marshall; Harry Blackmun · Lewis F. Powell Jr. William Rehnquist · John P. Stevens

Case opinions
- Majority: White, joined by Burger, Brennan, Stewart, Marshall, Blackmun, Stevens
- Concurrence: Burger
- Dissent: Rehnquist
- Powell took no part in the consideration or decision of the case.

Maryland v. Louisiana, 451 U.S. 725 (1981), is a U.S. Supreme Court case in which Maryland challenged a Louisiana law that prevented any tax on natural gas that would be extracted within the state. Maryland argued that it broke the Commerce Clause, and the Court rules in its favor.

== Bacckground ==
Many different entities including the United States, the Federal Energy Regulatory Commission (FERC), several states including Maryland, and multiple gas pipeline companies, called the Louisiana tax unconstitutional. They declared that the tax should not be able allocate the tax to other consumers, only to the ultimate consumer.

During the case's hearing of evidence, Louisiana's purposes for passing the Natural Gas Act were said to pay back the state's citizens who were affected by the damages to the state's coastal regions and to compensate citizens for the costs that the state paid to protect those resources. The act was said to violate the Supremacy Clause by requiring FERC to determine pipeline and producer costs and by subjecting them to judicial review.

== Decision ==
The U.S. Supreme Court supported Maryland in a 7-1 ruling. The favor ruled that Louisiana unconstitutionally used its "first-use" tax on natural gases and violated the Commerce Clause of the U.S. Constitution, which gives U.S. Congress the power to regulate commerce with foreign nations, several states, even Indian tribes.

The clause was first designed to prevent individual states from making laws that can unfairly restrict or hurt trade between the states. That helps keep the country's market open and fair. The Court decided that the Natural Gas Act violated the clause by the taxing that took place, and it also affirmed the Supremacy Clause.

== Aftermath ==
After the Supreme Court ruling, Louisiana had to stop its "first-use" tax. The decision gave a precedent in enforcing the Supremacy Clause for future cases.
