= Hines v. Davidowitz =

- Supreme Court of the United States

Argued December 10–11, 1940 Decided January 20, 1941
- Full case name: Hines, Secretary of Labor and Industry of Pennsylvania, et al. v. Davidowitz, et al.
- Citations: 312 U.S. 52 (more) 61 S. Ct. 399; 85 L. Ed. 581; 1941 U.S. LEXIS 1103

Case history
- Prior: Appeal from the District Court of the United States for the Middle District of Pennsylvania

Holding
- A state system of alien registration was superseded by a federal system (the Alien Registration Act) because it was an "obstacle to accomplishment" of its goals.

Court membership
- Chief Justice Charles E. Hughes Associate Justices James C. McReynolds · Harlan F. Stone; Owen Roberts · Hugo Black; Stanley F. Reed · Felix Frankfurter; William O. Douglas · Frank Murphy

Case opinions
- Majority: Black, joined by Roberts, Reed, Frankfurter, Douglas, Murphy
- Dissent: Stone, joined by Hughes, McReynolds

Hines v. Davidowitz, 312 U.S. 52 (1941), is a case applying the law of conflict preemption. The United States Supreme Court held that a Pennsylvania state system of alien registration was superseded by a federal system (the Alien Registration Act) because it was an "obstacle to the accomplishment" of its goals.

== Background ==
Pennsylvania passed a statute requiring aliens to register with the state, carry a state-issued identification card, and pay a small registration fee. The next year, Congress enacted a law requiring alien registration, but it did not require aliens to carry an identification card. The plaintiff conceded that there was neither explicit preemption nor field preemption.

== Opinion ==
The Court applied the prong of preemption doctrine which inquires whether state "law stands as an obstacle to the accomplishment and execution of the full purposes and objectives of Congress." Under the preemption doctrine, enforcement of a state alien registration law was barred by the federal Alien Registration Act.

Justice Hugo L. Black emphasized the supremacy of federal power over this area of law:

That the supremacy of the national power in the general field of foreign affairs, including power over immigration, naturalization and deportation, is made clear by the Constitution, was pointed out by the authors of The Federalist in 1787, and has since been given continuous recognition by this Court. When the national government by treaty or statute has established rules and regulations touching the rights, privileges, obligations or burdens of aliens as such, the treaty or statute is the supreme law of the land. No state can add to or take from the force and effect of such treaty or statute, for Article 6 of the Constitution provides that "This Constitution, and the Laws of the United States which shall be made in Pursuance thereof; and all Treaties made, or which shall be made, under the Authority of the United States, shall be the supreme Law of the Land; and the Judges in every State shall be bound thereby, any Thing in the Constitution or Laws of any State to the Contrary notwithstanding." The Federal Government, representing as it does the collective interests of the forty-eight states, is entrusted with full and exclusive responsibility for the conduct of affairs with foreign sovereignties. "For local interests the several States of the Union exist, but for national purposes, embracing our relations with foreign nations, we are but one people, one nation, one power.

In his dissent, Justice Stone noted the absence of any conflict between state and federal laws or any express congressional prohibition of state regulation.
