= Aveek Sarkar v. State of West Bengal =

2014 Supreme Court of India judgement

Aveek Sarkar v State Of West Bengal
- Court: Supreme Court of India
- Full case name: Aveek Sarkar & Anr vs State Of West Bengal And Anr
- Decided: 3 February 2014
- Citations: AIR 2014 SUPREME COURT 1495, 2014 (4) SCC 257, 2014 AIR SCW 1201, AIR 2014 SC (CRIMINAL) 800, 2014 (3) AJR 552, (2014) 2 MAD LW 944, 2014 (1) CALCRILR 810, 2014 (1) MADLW(CRI) 585, 2014 (2) SCALE 16, (2014) 137 ALLINDCAS 211 (SC), 2014 CALCRILR 1 810, (2014) 2 DLT(CRL) 244, (2014) 3 MH LJ (CRI) 166, (2014) 1 ORISSA LR 833, (2014) 2 CRILR(RAJ) 523, (2014) 2 ALLCRIR 1360, (2014) 1 MADLW(CRI) 677, 2014 (2) SCC (CRI) 291, (2014) 3 RAJ LW 2449, (2014) 1 KER LJ 695, (2014) 57 OCR 865, 2014 CRILR(SC&MP) 523, 2014 CRILR(SC MAH GUJ) 523, 2014 (1) ABR (CRI) 757, (2014) 1 MAD LJ(CRI) 585, (2014) 1 KER LT 62, (2014) 1 RECCRIR 919, (2014) 1 CURCRIR 447, (2014) 2 SCALE 16, (2014) 1 UC 558, (2014) 1 CRIMES 218, (2014) 2 ALD(CRL) 131, 2014 (4) KCCR SN 341 (KAR)

Case history
- Appealed from: Calcutta High Court

Outcome
- Hicklin test rejected and community standards test adopted

Court membership
- Judges sitting: Arjan Kumar Sikri and [K. S. Panicker Radhakrishnan]
- Chief judge: Rajendra Mal Lodha

Laws applied
- This case overturned a previous ruling
- Ranjit D. Udeshi v. State Of Maharashtra

Aveek Sarkar v. State of West Bengal (2014) 4 SCC 257 is a landmark judgment of the Supreme Court of India that redefined the legal standard for determining obscenity under Indian law. Delivered on February 3, 2014, by a bench comprising Justice K.S. Radhakrishnan and Justice A.K. Sikri, the decision rejected the outdated Hicklin test in favor of the more progressive "community standards test," aligning Indian jurisprudence with contemporary societal values.

== Background ==
The case originated from a controversy surrounding the publication of a photograph in two Indian publications: Sports World magazine and the Bengali newspaper Anandabazar Patrika. The image, originally published in the German magazine Stern, depicted renowned tennis player Boris Becker posing nude alongside his fiancée, Barbara Feltus, a film actress. The photograph, taken by Feltus's father, accompanied an article in which Becker and Feltus discussed their engagement and their intent to protest racial discrimination, particularly the practice of apartheid. In the image, Becker's hand covered Feltus's breasts, prompting debate over its propriety.

In 1993, a lawyer filed a complaint against Aveek Sarkar, the editor of Sports World, and others involved with Anandabazar Patrika, alleging that the photograph violated Section 292 of the Indian Penal Code (IPC), which criminalizes the sale, distribution, or public exhibition of obscene material. The complainant further argued that the image contravened Section 4 of the Indecent Representation of Women (Prohibition) Act, 1986, asserting that it was sexually titillating, morally degrading, and likely to encourage sexual offenses. A magistrate in Kolkata found a prima facie case under Section 292 IPC and issued summons to the accused on May 10, 1993.

The accused sought to quash the proceedings, contending that reproducing the Stern article and photograph did not constitute an offense, as it carried a socially significant message. However, the Calcutta High Court declined to intervene, leading to an appeal before the Supreme Court of India.

== Legal issues ==
The primary legal question before the Supreme Court was whether the photograph constituted "obscene" material under Section 292 of the IPC. This required the court to evaluate the applicable test for obscenity and determine whether the publication's context and intent mitigated its alleged offensiveness.

Historically, Indian courts had relied on the Hicklin test, established in the 1868 English case R v. Hicklin. This test deemed material obscene if it tended to "deprave and corrupt" those whose minds were open to immoral influences, assessed from the perspective of the most vulnerable individuals. Critics argued that this standard was overly subjective and disconnected from modern societal norms.

== Judgement ==
In its judgment, the Supreme Court explicitly discarded the Hicklin test, deeming it anachronistic and ill-suited to contemporary India. Instead, the Court adopted the "community standards test," which evaluates obscenity based on the prevailing standards of the broader community Ascertainment of this standard was influenced by precedents from the United States, notably Miller v. California (1973), where a similar test was established.

Justice K.S. Radhakrishnan, writing for the bench, emphasized that obscenity must be assessed holistically, considering the material's context, intent, and overall message, rather than isolating specific elements. Applying this standard, the court held that the photograph of Becker and Feltus did not qualify as obscene. The justices noted that the image conveyed a message of racial equality and love triumphing over hatred, rather than appealing to prurient interests. Furthermore, the court observed that Feltus's breasts were fully covered by Becker's hand, and the photograph was taken by her father, reinforcing its non-sexual intent.

The court ruled that a nude or semi-nude image is not per se obscene unless it is designed to arouse sexual passion or reveal an overt sexual desire, judged by contemporary community standards rather than the sensibilities of a hypersensitive minority. Consequently, no offense was established under Section 292 IPC, and the criminal proceedings against Sarkar and others were quashed.

== Significance ==
The decision in Aveek Sarkar v. State of West Bengal marked a significant shift in Indian obscenity law, modernizing the legal framework to reflect evolving societal norms. By adopting the community standards test, the court expanded protections for freedom of expression under Article 19(1)(a) of the Indian Constitution, balancing them against reasonable restrictions permissible under Article 19(2).

The ruling has been widely regarded as progressive, aligning Indian jurisprudence with global trends in freedom of expression and artistic liberty. It has influenced subsequent judicial interpretations of obscenity and remains a binding precedent under Article 141 of the Constitution, which mandates that Supreme Court decisions are authoritative for all courts in India.

== See also ==
- Section 292 of the Indian Penal Code
- Freedom of Expression in India
- Miller v. California
- R v. Hicklin
