= Hicklin =

Hicklin is a surname. Notable people with the surname include:

- Aaron Hicklin, American magazine editor
- Ashley Hicklin (born 1985), English singer-songwriter
- Barbara Roe Hicklin (1918–2010), Canadian painter
- Benjamin Hicklin (1818–1909), English solicitor and mayor
- Edwin Richley Hicklin (1895–1963), American judge and politician

== See also ==
- Hicklin test, a legal test
- Hicklin Lake
