= Memoirs v. Massachusetts =

- Supreme Court of the United States

Argued December 7–8, 1965 Decided March 21, 1966
- Full case name: A Book Named "John Cleland's Memoirs of a Woman of Pleasure", et al. v. Attorney General of Massachusetts
- Citations: 383 U.S. 413 (more) 86 S. Ct. 975; 16 L. Ed. 2d 1; 1966 U.S. LEXIS 2906; 1 Media L. Rep. 1390

Holding
- Since the First Amendment forbids censorship of expression of ideas not linked with illegal action, Fanny Hill cannot be proscribed.

Court membership
- Chief Justice Earl Warren Associate Justices Hugo Black · William O. Douglas; Tom C. Clark · John M. Harlan II; William J. Brennan Jr. · Potter Stewart; Byron White · Abe Fortas

Case opinions
- Plurality: Brennan, joined by Warren, Fortas
- Concurrence: Black, joined by Stewart
- Concurrence: Douglas
- Dissent: Clark
- Dissent: Harlan
- Dissent: White

Laws applied
- U.S. Const. amend. I

Memoirs v. Massachusetts, 383 U.S. 413 (1966), is a United States Supreme Court decision clarifying a holding regarding obscenity made a decade earlier in Roth v. United States (1957).

Roth established that for a work of literature to be considered obscene, it had to be proven by censors to: 1) appeal to prurient interest, 2) be patently offensive, and 3) have no redeeming social value. The literature in Roth v. United States was the 1749 erotic novel Memoirs of a Woman of Pleasure (popularly known as Fanny Hill) by John Cleland, and the Court held in Memoirs that, while Fanny Hill might fit the first two criteria (it appealed to prurient interest and was patently offensive), it could not be proven that it had no redeeming social value. Specifically, it was held by the plurality opinion that a book could not be banned unless it were held to be "utterly without redeeming social value" [emphasis in original]. The judgment continued that the book could still be held obscene under certain circumstances—for instance, if it were marketed solely for its prurient appeal.

== Subsequent developments ==
The Memoirs standard for obscenity prompted continued debate over the definition of obscenity and was superseded by the Supreme Court's 1973 decision in Miller v. California, which established a more flexible three‑prong test based on local community standards called the Miller test.

The fact that Memoirs was only decided by a plurality of justices led to controversy over whether it was controlling law until being superseded by Miller. This led to a decision in the 1977 Supreme Court case Marks v. United States regarding how the holding of a case should be viewed where there is no majority supporting the rationale of any opinion and the precedential value of such a holding. In Marks, the court held that when a split court decides a case and no single rationale explaining the result enjoys the assent of five Justices, "the holding of the Court may be viewed as that position taken by those members who concurred in the judgments on the narrowest grounds" (quoting the plurality opinion of Justices Potter Stewart, Lewis Powell, and John Paul Stevens in the 1976 case Gregg v. Georgia).

== See also ==
- Banned in Boston
- List of United States Supreme Court cases, volume 383
