= Heller v. New York =

- Supreme Court of the United States

Argued Nov 14, 1972 Decided June 25, 1973
- Full case name: Heller v. New York
- Citations: 413 U.S. 483 (more) 93 S. Ct. 2789; 37 L. Ed. 2d 745; 1973 U.S. LEXIS 30

Case history
- Prior: Found guilty by New York City Criminal Court, upheld by New York Supreme Court and New York Court of Appeals
- Subsequent: None

Holding
- 1. Where a film is seized for the bona fide purpose of preserving it as evidence in a criminal proceeding, and it is seized pursuant to a warrant issued after a determination of probable obscenity by a neutral magistrate, and following the seizure a prompt judicial determination of the obscenity issue in an adversary proceeding is available at the request of any interested party, the seizure is constitutionally permissible. On a showing to the trial court that other copies of the film are not available for exhibition, the court should permit the seized film to be copied so that exhibition can be continued pending judicial resolution of the obscenity issue in an adversary proceeding. Otherwise, the film must be returned. 2. The case is remanded to afford the state courts an opportunity to reconsider petitioner's substantive challenges in light of Miller v. California, ante, p. 413 U.S. 15, and Paris Adult Theatre I v. Slaton, ante, p. 413 U.S. 49, which establish guidelines for the lawful state regulation of obscene material. P. 413 U.S. 494.

Court membership
- Chief Justice Warren E. Burger Associate Justices William O. Douglas · William J. Brennan Jr. Potter Stewart · Byron White; Thurgood Marshall · Harry Blackmun; Lewis F. Powell Jr. · William Rehnquist

Case opinions
- Majority: Burger, joined by White, Blackmun, Powell, Rehnquist
- Dissent: Douglas
- Dissent: Brennan, joined by Stewart, Marshall

Laws applied
- U.S. Const. amends. I, XIV; N.Y.Penal Law § 235.05

Heller v. New York, 413 U.S. 483 (1973), was a United States Supreme Court decision which upheld that states could make laws limiting the distribution of obscene material, provided that these laws were consistent with the Miller test for obscene material established by the Supreme Court in Miller v. California, 413 U.S. 15 (1973). Heller was initially convicted for showing a sexually explicit film in the movie theater which he owned, under New York Penal Law § 235.0 which stated that and individual “is guilty of obscenity when, knowing its content and character, he 1. Promotes, or possesses with intent to promote, any obscene material; or 2. Produces, presents or directs an obscene performance or participates in a portion thereof which is obscene or which contributes to its obscenity."

Heller appealed this ruling to the supreme court, claiming that his first amendment rights had been violated due to the broad nature of New York's obscenity laws. The defendant also claimed that his 14th amendment rights had been violated due to the fact the film was seized prior to him receiving a hearing of any kind. The Supreme Court ruled in favor of Heller in a 5–4 decision, with the majority decision delivered by Justice Burger. The Court found the procedure by which the film was seized to be constitutional but ruled in favor of Heller in order to afford New York a chance to bring their obscenity laws in line with the guidelines established by the Supreme Court in Miller v. California. The dissenting opinions were written by Justices William O. Douglas and William J. Brennan Jr., the latter of which was joined by Justices Potter Stewart and Thurgood Marshall. These dissenting opinions argued that the obscenity laws that Heller was convicted under were themselves unconstitutional and thus the seizure of the film was unconstitutional. This case was one of several cases that the Burger court ruled on concerning obscenity laws in the early 1970s.

== Background ==
Heller was the manager of the New Andy Warhol Garrick movie theater in Greenwich Village, New York city. On July 29, 1969, the Andy Warhol film Blue Movie was displayed, a film which depicts a couple engaged in sexually explicit acts and discussing various subjects ranging from athletes foot the Vietnam War. Three police officers saw part of this screening of the film and based on their observations an assistant district attorney requested that a judge of the New York criminal court see the film. On July 31, 1969, a judge accompanied by a police inspector saw the film and deemed that the film was “obscene as I saw it then under the definition of obscene, that is [in] . . . section 235.00 of the Penal Law.". The judge thus issued John Doe warrants for the arrest of the not only the theater manager, but also the projectionist and ticket tacker. The judge and police inspector both stated that they did not recall seeing any signs that limited admission to film to only adults. The theater manager as well as the ticket taker and projectionists were arrested and the film seized. There was no pretrial claim that the copy of the film seized as evidence was the only copy.

The case came to trial in the New York City Criminal Court on September 16, 1969, before 3 judges. Heller provided several “experts” to testify that the film “had social, literary, and artistic importance” and also testified that in addition to signs restricting the admittance of anyone under 17 the staff had been instructed to not allow in those under 18. Heller argued that the seizure of the film violated his 14th amendment right and that the New York state obscenity laws under which the film was seized violated the first amendment because they were vague and more broad than necessary. Heller also argued that films shown exclusively to consenting adults in private are free speech protected by the constitution.

The defendant was found guilty by the New York City Criminal Court, a decision that was upheld on appeal by both the Supreme Court of the State of New York and the New York Court of Appeals. The Court of appeals cited the Supreme Court's ruling in Lee Art Theatre v. Virginia its decision, which stated that a judge could not issue a warrant for the seizure of a film based only the word of an officer. The Court of appeals felt that because the judge had in fact gone to see the film himself he had sufficient grounds to constitutionally issue a warrant for seizure of the film even without a formal hearing.

== Majority opinion ==
The majority opinion was delivered by Justice Berger and joined by justices White, Powell, Blackmun and Rehnquist. It held that the procedure by which the film was seized and the seizing of the film were constitutional and violated neither the first or fourteenth amendment. Burger held that Heller's assertion that films show only to consenting adults in private was protected was incorrect as the court ruled Paris Adult Theatre I v. Slaton 413 U.S. 49 (1973). that the privacy granted in the home does not necessarily extend to the theatre and that even consenting adults can be subject to governmental restrictions for the “legitimate state interests at stake in stemming the tide of commercialized obscenity".

Furthermore, the New York Court of Appeals applied correctly the precedent set in Lee Art Theatre v. Virginia, which ruled that as long as the judge's procedure prior to issuing the warrant was "designed to focus searchingly on the question of obscenity”, the judge did not have to even see the film himself. By doing so the Judge had made every effort to determine the question of obscenity for himself. Also the protection of seizure set forth in Quantity of Books v. Kansas 378 U.S. 205 (1964), only applied to obscene materials being seized for the expressed purpose of being destroyed.

As long as there was another copy of the film was available, the seizure for the purpose of evidence was okay, and if there was no other copy as long as the defendant could be allowed to make another pending a judicial decision it would still be constitutional. Since the record failed to show there were no other copies and there was no pretrial motion to make more copies the State was allowed to seize the film. However, the case was remanded in order to afford the New York Court of Appeals to make changes to the underlying definition of obscenity according to the guidelines laid out by the court in the recently decided Miller v. California.

== Dissenting opinion ==
There were two dissenting opinions in this case. Justice Douglas dissented on the grounds that he would have preferred to outright reverse the decision as he felt as though the underlying obscenity law for which Heller was charged was unconstitutional and violated the first amendment. Justice Douglas referenced his dissenting opinion in United States v. 12 200-ft. Reels of Film, in which he stated that “I know of no constitutional way by which a book, tract, paper, postcard, or film may be made contraband because of its contents”, as well as his dissenting opinion in Miller v. California in which he argued that the court should not try to define obscenity by itself as there are no constitutional guidelines for what should be considered obscene.

Justice Brennan dissented as well, joined by justices Stewart and Marshall, arguing that the obscenity law was too broad to be considered constitutional and thus there could be no grounds to seize the film. Justice Brennan also referenced his dissent in Paris Adult Theatre I v. Slaton in which he stated that the difficulty in precisely defining material as obscene is what makes it impossible to outright ban obscenity.

== Subsequent developments ==
During the time period between when the court agreed to hear Heller v. New York they ruled on Miller v. California, a ruling which established that states could make obscenity laws, provided they follow the guidelines of the Miller test. The Miller test contained 3 parts and became the standard for determining whether material was obscene. The 3 parts were:

Whether "the average person, applying contemporary community standards", would find that the work, taken as a whole, appeals to the prurient interest,

Whether the work depicts or describes, in a patently offensive way, sexual conduct or excretory functions specifically defined by applicable state law,

Whether the work, taken as a whole, lacks serious literary, artistic, political, or scientific value.

The Court also asked for the New York Court of Appeals to make sure that their definition of obscenity was concurrent with standard set in Miller v. California. The New York Court of Appeals later confirmed in a 5–4 decision that New York Penal Law § 235.0 was constitutional as it was already written, even after considering the new obsceneity definition put forth in Miller v. California.

Heller set the precedent that a judge who had seen a movie considered to be obscene could issue a warrant for its seizure without having to hold a hearing on whether or not the content was truly obscene, as long as there were other copies of the film were available, and in the case that no other copies existed, as long as the defendant was allowed to make copies prior to a formal hearing. This was an expansion on the precedent set in Lee Art Theatre v. Virginia that a judge must determine probable cause of something being obscene, by more explicitly saying that a judge having seen a film himself was sufficient grounds for the judge issuing a warrant to seize a film based on obscenity charges. This precedent was cited in New York v. P. J. Video, Inc., 475 U.S. 868 (1986), another obscenity case in which films were seized on charges of being obscene. In this case the owners of a video store tried to claim that there was a higher standard for determining probable cause in obscenity cases than an investigator simply watching the film. The supreme court ruled against PJ Video, citing there decision in Heller v. New York that an official watching the film themselves was sufficient probable cause for the seizure of a film.

This case is an interesting example of one section of free speech where American courts and European courts agree to an extent, as shown in the landmark case Handyside v United Kingdom (5493/72), where the seizure of materials deemed to be obscene was by the government was found to be permissible by the European Court of Human Rights, much like it was in this case and in New York v. Heller and New York v. P.j. Video. In Handyside v United Kingdom, Handyside had books seized for being obscene, not completely unlike Heller's film which was seized, although some key differences appear in the 2 cases, such as the intended audiences of each. However, the fact remains that in both these cases the government was able to seize material due to it being obscene, while both attempting to prevent, to an extent, the over labeling of materials as obscene.

== See also ==
- List of United States Supreme Court cases, volume 413
- Miller test
