= Ranjit D. Udeshi v. State of Maharashtra =

1964 decision of the Supreme Court of India

Ranjit D. Udeshi vs State Of Maharashtra
- Court: Supreme Court of India
- Full case name: Ranjit D. Udeshi vs State Of Maharashtra
- Decided: 19 August 1964
- Citation: 1965 AIR 881, 1965 SCR (1) 65, AIR 1965 SUPREME COURT 881, 1966 MAH LJ 257 1965 (1) SCWR 778, 1965 (1) SCWR 778, 1965 (2) CRI. L. J. 8, 1965 (1) SCR 65, 1966 MPLJ 273, 1967 BOM LR 506, 67 BOM L R 506

Outcome
- Constitutional Validity of Section 292 of Indian Penal Code upheld

Court membership
- Judges sitting: M. Hidayatullah, P. B. Gajendragadkar, Kailas Nath Wanchoo, J.C. Shah, N. Rajagopala Ayyangar
- Chief judge: P. B. Gajendragadkar

Laws applied
- Overruled by
- Aveek Sarkar v. State of West Bengal

Ranjit D. Udeshi v. State of Maharashtra (1965 AIR 881, 1965 SCR (1) 65) is a landmark decision by the Supreme Court of India that addressed the issue of obscenity under Indian law. The case involved the prosecution of Ranjit D. Udeshi, a bookseller, for selling copies of D.H. Lawrence's novel Lady Chatterley's Lover, which was deemed obscene under Section 292 of the Indian Penal Code (IPC). The ruling upheld the constitutionality of Section 292 and established the applicability of the Hicklin Test in India for determining obscenity, significantly influencing the country's jurisprudence on freedom of speech and expression until it was revisited in later cases.

== Background ==
Ranjit D. Udeshi was one of four partners of a firm that operated a bookstore called "Happy Book Stall" in Bombay (now Mumbai). On December 12, 1959, Udeshi and his partners were found in possession of the unexpurgated edition of Lady Chatterley's Lover for the purpose of sale. The novel, written by English author D.H. Lawrence and first published in 1928, contained explicit descriptions of sexual acts and challenged conventional social norms, leading to its ban in several countries. In India, the partners were prosecuted under Section 292 of the IPC, which criminalizes the sale, distribution, or possession of obscene material.

The case progressed through the lower courts, where Udeshi and his partners were convicted. The Bombay High Court upheld the conviction, prompting Udeshi to appeal to the Supreme Court of India by way of a special leave petition. The appeal raised significant constitutional questions about the balance between freedom of speech and expression under Article 19(1)(a) of the Indian Constitution and the state's power to impose restrictions under Article 19(2) in the interest of public decency and morality.

== Issues ==
The Supreme Court was tasked with addressing the following key issues:

1. Whether Section 292 of the IPC violated the fundamental right to freedom of speech and expression guaranteed under Article 19(1)(a) of the Constitution.
2. Whether the unexpurgated edition of Lady Chatterley's Lover was obscene within the meaning of Section 292.
3. Whether the prosecution needed to prove that the accused had knowledge of the book's obscene content to secure a conviction.

== Judgment ==
The Supreme Court delivered its judgment on August 19, 1964, in a unanimous decision by a five-judge Constitution Bench comprising Chief Justice P.B. Gajendragadkar, and Justices K.N. Wanchoo, M. Hidayatullah, J.C. Shah, and N. Rajagopala Ayyangar. Justice M. Hidayatullah authored the opinion.

The Court rejected Udeshi's contention that Section 292 was unconstitutional. It held that the provision fell within the permissible restrictions under Article 19(2), which allows the state to impose reasonable limitations on free speech in the interest of public decency or morality. The Court emphasized that obscenity, defined as material that tends to "deprave and corrupt" susceptible minds, was not protected speech under Article 19(1)(a). The ruling affirmed that the state had a legitimate interest in regulating such content to maintain societal standards of morality.

The Court adopted the Hicklin Test, derived from the English case Regina v. Hicklin (1868), to determine what constitutes obscenity. Under this test, material is deemed obscene if it has the tendency "to deprave and corrupt those whose minds are open to such immoral influences and into whose hands a publication of this sort may fall." The Court applied this standard to Lady Chatterley's Lover and found that specific passages, when viewed in isolation, met the criteria for obscenity due to their explicit sexual content. The justices declined to consider the book as a whole or evaluate its artistic or literary merit, focusing instead on the potentially corrupting effect of isolated sections.

Udeshi argued that he should not be held liable unless the prosecution proved he knowingly sold obscene material. The Court dismissed this contention, ruling that Section 292 imposed strict liability. It held that the mere act of selling or possessing obscene material for sale was sufficient to establish guilt, regardless of the accused's intent or awareness of the content. This interpretation underscored the protective intent of the law over individual mens rea (guilty mind).

The Supreme Court upheld Udeshi's conviction, affirming the fines imposed by the lower courts (Rs. 20 with one week's simple imprisonment in default for each partner). The decision solidified the legal framework for obscenity in India at the time, prioritizing public morality over artistic freedom.

== Significance ==
Ranjit Udeshi v. State of Maharashtra was a pivotal case in Indian constitutional and criminal law. It established the Hicklin Test as the standard for obscenity in India, a precedent that persisted for nearly five decades. The ruling also clarified the scope of Article 19(2), reinforcing the state's authority to curb free expression when it conflicted with societal norms of decency.

The decision reflected the conservative judicial and social attitudes of mid-20th-century India, where explicit discussions of sexuality were largely taboo. Critics later argued that the Hicklin Test, with its focus on isolated passages and vulnerable audiences, was overly restrictive and failed to account for the broader context or artistic value of a work.

== Subsequent developments ==
The Hicklin Test remained the dominant standard in India until it was overruled by the Supreme Court in Aveek Sarkar v. State of West Bengal (2014). In that case, the Court adopted the "Community Standards Test," which assesses material in its entirety and considers contemporary societal norms rather than the susceptibility of particular individuals. The shift marked a significant evolution in Indian obscenity law, aligning it more closely with modern liberal perspectives on free expression.

Ranjit Udeshi continues to be studied as a foundational case in the development of Indian jurisprudence on obscenity, illustrating the tension between individual rights and collective moral standards.

== See also ==
- Aveek Sarkar v. State of West Bengal
- Article 19 of the Constitution of India
- Section 292 of the Indian Penal Code
- Hicklin Test
- Freedom of speech and expression in India
