= Wharfinger =

Archaic term for a person who is the keeper or owner of a wharf

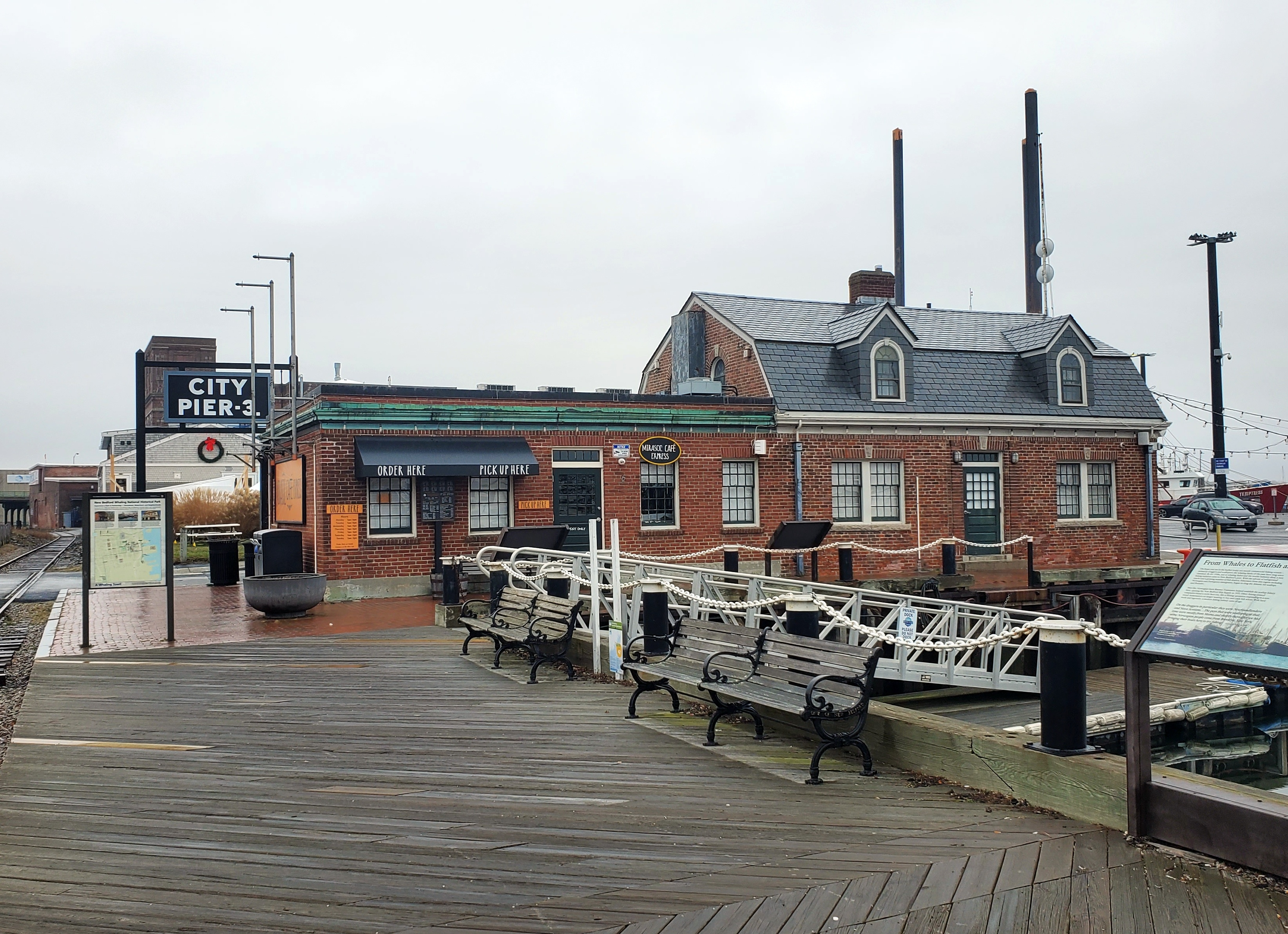
The former Wharfinger's Building in New Bedford, Massachusetts

Wharfinger (pronounced WORF-in-jer) is an archaic term for a person who is the keeper or owner of a wharf. The wharfinger takes custody of and is responsible for goods delivered to the wharf, typically has an office on the wharf or dock, and is responsible for day-to-day activities including slipways, keeping tide tables and resolving disputes.

The term is rarely used; today a wharfinger is usually called a "harbourmaster".

== Etymology ==
The word's etymology is probably Elizabethan-era English, and possibly a corruption of wharfager. An 1844 usage appears in Pigot's Directory of Dorset in which Beales and Cox are noted to be wharfingers for the Port of Weymouth.

== Duties ==
In Smith v. Burnett, 173 U.S. 430 (1899), the US Supreme Court set forth the primary duties a wharfinger owes to vessels using the dock. A wharfinger does not guarantee the safety of the vessels using its dock, but must exercise reasonable diligence to determine the condition of the berth, remove dangerous obstructions or provide a warning thereof, provide a usable entrance and exit to the dock, maintain sufficient depth for anticipated vessels by dredging, and warn of latent hazards and dangers.

== Current usage ==
While the term "harbormaster" has supplanted the term "wharfinger" in some areas, it remains in popular use. For example, in the town of Saint Andrews in the Canadian province of New Brunswick, wharfinger is the name for the official responsible for the Market Wharf. The same is true in the Port of Nanaimo in the Canadian province of British Columbia. At the Port of Los Angeles, wharfingers are facilitators and problem solvers.

== Historical and literary uses ==
- Richard Wharfinger is the name of a fictional Jacobean playwright—author of The Courier's Tragedy—in Thomas Pynchon's 1965 novel The Crying of Lot 49.
- British author Jane Wilson-Howarth's grandfather listed his occupation on his daughter's birth certificate in 1926 as wharfinger; he was supervisor of a warehouse in the London Docks between the wars.
- Benjamin Hicklin's father, also Benjamin, was a wharfinger at the time of the signing of young Benjamin's articles to an attorney at law in 1832. Hicklin, the son, is remembered through the Hicklin test, a legal definition of obscenity.
- In the 1832 novel The Pickwick Papers by Charles Dickens, the father of Mr. Winkle is a wharfinger.

== See also ==
- Slipway
- Wharf
- Demurrage
- bonded warehouse
- Berth
- yacht
- yacht broker
- houseboat
