= Redrup v. New York =

- Supreme Court of the United States

Argued October 10–11, 1966 Decided May 8, 1967
- Full case name: Robert Redrup, Petitioners v. State of New York; William L. Austin, Petitioner v. State of Kentucky; Gent, et al., Appellants v. State of Arkansas
- Citations: 386 U.S. 767 (more) 87 S. Ct. 1414; 18 L. Ed. 2d 515; 1967 U.S. LEXIS 1571

Holding
- Written materials that were not sold to minors, or foisted on unwilling audiences were constitutionally protected.

Court membership
- Chief Justice Earl Warren Associate Justices Hugo Black · William O. Douglas; Tom C. Clark · John M. Harlan II; William J. Brennan Jr. · Potter Stewart; Byron White · Abe Fortas

Case opinions
- Per curiam
- Dissent: Harlan, joined by Clark

Redrup v. New York, 386 U.S. 767 (1967), was a May 8, 1967 ruling by the Supreme Court of the United States, widely regarded as the end of American censorship of written fiction. Robert Redrup was a Times Square newsstand clerk who sold two of William Hamling's Greenleaf Classics paperback pulp sex novels, Lust Pool and Shame Agent, to a plainclothes police officer. He was tried and convicted in 1965.

With financial backing from Hamling, Redrup appealed his case to the Supreme Court where his conviction was overturned by 7–2. The court's final ruling affirmed that written materials that were neither sold to minors nor foisted on unwilling audiences were constitutionally protected, thereby de facto ending American censorship of written material. After this decision, the Supreme Court systematically and summarily reversed, without further opinion, scores of obscenity rulings involving paperback sex books.

== "Redrupping" ==
The Court's decision came at a time when the Justices were unable to agree upon a single, workable test regarding what would constitute obscenity. For example, Justice Stewart's belief that hard-core pornography should be covered by obscenity law, even if he was unable to state a clear definition for what exactly constituted "hard-core" material, was summed up with his notorious expression: "I know it when I see it."

Accordingly, the Court adopted a process by which each justice would review the material in question and determine, according to their own understanding, whether or not it constituted obscenity. To do this, the Justices would gather in a conference room in the U.S. Supreme Court Building to watch the films being challenged by obscenity cases. This process was referred to in lawyer's slang as "redrupping."

Justices Douglas and Black did not attend these screenings; both men took an absolutist, anti-censorship approach towards the First Amendment and did not believe that any films should be banned. Justice Burger also preferred not to go. Justice Harlan, whose eyesight was deteriorating in old age, would sit closest to the screen in order to see the outlines of what was happening on-screen, and often required clerks or fellow Justices to describe the action.

The "redrupping" era came to an end with the 1973 decision Miller v. California, which laid down the three-prong standard known as the Miller test for obscenity.

== See also ==
- Roth v. United States, 354 U.S. 476 (1957)
- Miller v. California, 413 U.S. 15 (1973)
