= Indecent behavior =

Indecent behavior may refer to:

- Indecent exposure
- Lascivious behavior
