= United States v. Kilbride =

Appellate case decided in 2009

- Court: United States Court of Appeals for the Ninth Circuit
- Full case name: United States of America v. Jeffrey A. Kilbride and James Robert Schaffer
- Argued: June 8 2009
- Decided: October 29 2009
- Citation: 584 F.3d 1240 (2009)

Case history
- Prior history: Appeal from the United States District Court for the District of Arizona

Holding
- Affirmed, but remanded for a clerical correction.

Court membership
- Judges sitting: Procter Hug, Jr., Betty B. Fletcher, Michael Daly Hawkins

Case opinions
- Majority: Betty B. Fletcher

Laws applied
- 18 U.S.C. § 1037(a)(3), 18 U.S.C. § 1037(a)(4), 18 U.S.C. § 1462, 18 U.S.C. § 1465, 18 U.S.C. § 1956

United States v. Kilbride, 584 F.3d 1240 (9th Cir. 2009) is a case from the United States Court of Appeals for the Ninth Circuit rejecting an appeal from two individuals convicted of violating the Can Spam Act and United States obscenity law. The defendants were appealing convictions on 8 counts from the District Court of Arizona for distributing pornographic spam via email. The second count which the defendants were found guilty of involved the falsification of the "From" field of email headers, which is illegal to do multiple times in commercial settings under 18 USC § 1037(a)(3). The case is particularly notable because of the majority opinion on obscenity, in which Judge Fletcher writes an argument endorsing the use of a national community obscenity standard for the internet.

== Background ==
Jeffrey A. Kilbride and James Robert Schaffer ran an unsolicited bulk email company called Ganymede Marketing, which sent hundreds of thousands to millions of spam emails a year. These emails advertised a variety of products, including sexually explicit websites, and a portion of them contained sexually explicit images. Kilbride and Schaffer set up Ganymede as a foreign shell company in an attempt to avoid United States laws and gave fake contact information both in the emails they sent and their website registrations. The FTC and AOL claimed to have received over 600,000 complaints relating to spam emails sent by Ganymede, before they were finally taken to court in Arizona for violating anti-spam and obscenity laws.

On June 25, 2007, the United States District Court, D. Arizona found the defendants guilty of 8 counts:

- Count 1: Conspiring to violate 18 U.S.C. § 1037(a)(3) and 18 U.S.C. § 1037(a)(4) from the Can Spam Act
- Count 2 and 3: Violating two of the Can Spam Act's provisions, 18 U.S.C. § 1037(a)(3) and 18 U.S.C. § 1037(a)(4), for falsifying email header information including the "from" field and registering domain names using false information, respectively
- Count 4-7: Violating 18 U.S.C. § 1462 and 18 U.S.C. § 1465, for transporting obscenity and transporting obscenity with the intent of commerce, respectively. The defendants were charged with violations for each of two specific obscene pictures that their company had sent out as an advertisement.
- Count 8: Violating 18 U.S.C. § 1956 for money laundering due to moving money obtained from their illegal spamming business overseas in an attempt to conceal its origin

Following their conviction, Kilbride and Schaffer moved for acquittal or a retrial based on a number of arguments involving jury instructions and evidence pertaining to the obscenity charges. The District Court rejected these arguments and denied their motion.

Subsequently, Kilbride and Schaffer appealed to the Ninth Circuit Court of Appeals (this case), arguing that:

- The jury instructions for determining obscenity were flawed
- The relevant sections of the Can Spam Act are overly vague, and therefore unconstitutional
- There is a clerical error causing counts 1–3 to be listed as felonies, when they should be misdemeanors
- If the preceding appeals are successful, the count of conspiracy money laundering is invalid, because it no longer has a prerequisite felony charge
- An obstruction of justice charge against Kilbride was in error

== Opinion of the court ==
In the majority opinion, Judge Fletcher agreed with the defendants that there was a clerical error regarding counts 1-3 and remanded, but affirmed the other District court rulings. In each case, either the appeal was rejected outright, or error from the district court was recognized, but found not to be plain error or have significantly affected the outcome of the case.

=== Obscenity and community standards ===
The most involved and important section of the opinion deals with the defendants' argument that the instructions given the jury regarding determining obscenity were flawed. This argument focuses on the District Court's implementation of the Miller Test for determining that the images distributed by Kilbride and Schaffer were obscene and therefore not protected as free speech. The relevant section of the Miller Test states that to be obscene, "'the average person, applying contemporary community standards', would find that the work, taken as a whole, appeals to the prurient interest".

The defendants challenged the instructions given to the jury on obscenity in two ways. First, they challenged that the jury was instructed to "apply the standards of communities outside their own community" in contrast with precedent. Second, they challenged that the court was even correct in applying a community standard given that email is not constrained to certain geographical areas or communities.

In response to the first challenge, the court cites precedent, suggesting that the "portion of the instruction explicitly and implicitly allowing jurors to consider evidence of standards existing in places outside of the district is clearly permitted under Hamling." Additionally, they argue that referencing standards outside of the immediate community in no way prejudices jurors against the defendants.

In contrast, the court agrees with the main point in the second challenge - that community standards are outmoded in the age of the internet. As Judge Fletcher writes in the opinion: "We agree with Defendants that the district court should have instructed the jury to apply a national community standard." The court argues that email is different from other communication subject to community standards because "they cannot tailor their message to the specific communities into which they disseminate their speech and truly must comply with the standards of the least tolerant community in a manner the defendants in [precedent] did not."

Since this position was novel and not clearly supported by precedent, the court turned to a supreme court case to find justification. Citing many different opinions in Ashcroft v. ACLU, 535 U.S. 564 (2002), the court builds a case that the majority of justices view local community standards as a problem when applied to the internet. Additionally, evidence is provided that many justices do not see a national community standard to be a problem, or unconstitutional. In summary, Judge Fletcher writes: "Accordingly, five Justices concurring in the judgment, as well as the dissenting Justice, viewed the application of local community standards in defining obscenity on the Internet as generating serious constitutional concerns. At the same time, five justices concurring in the judgment viewed the application of a national community standard as not or likely not posing the same concerns by itself."

Despite this huge shift in how the court is suggesting obscenity should be judged, the obscenity conviction in this case was confirmed. The court states that its reasoning, though distilled from "the various opinions in Ashcroft... was far from clear and obvious to the district court" and so it is not a reversible error to be addressed.

== Subsequent developments ==
Though the Ninth Circuit Court proposed new guidelines for judging internet obscenity, other Circuit Courts have chosen not to follow suit. In an unpublished opinion, the Eleventh Circuit Court rejected the idea of a national community standard, instead relying on a local one. This has been interpreted as proof that there is disagreement on whether the Ninth Circuit misinterpreted the Supreme Court's opinion. The Supreme Court has not directly weighed in on the matter since.

=== Prison escape and recapture ===
On December 27, 2013, Kilbride escaped from the federal prison in Lompoc. He was apprehended and returned to prison on December 28, 2013.
