= Patently offensive =

Term used in U.S. obscenity law

Patently offensive is a term used in United States law regarding obscenity under the First Amendment.

The phrase "offensive" first appeared in Roth v. United States (1957), referring to any obscene acts or materials that are considered to be openly, plainly, or clearly visible as offensive to the viewing public. The Roth standard outlined what is to be considered obscene and thus not under First Amendment protection. The Roth standard was further defined as "patently offensive" and largely replaced by the Miller test established by Miller v. California (1973).

== Roth standard ==
According to the "Roth Standard" a work is obscene if:

- The dominant theme of the material taken as a whole appeals to a prurient interest in sex,
- The material is patently offensive because it affronts contemporary community standards relating to the description or representation of sexual matters,
- The material is utterly without redeeming social value

== Miller test ==
The Miller test was developed in the 1973 case Miller v. California. It has three parts:

- Whether the average person, applying contemporary community standards, would find that the work, taken as a whole, appeals to the prurient interest,
- Whether the work depicts/describes, in a patently offensive way, sexual conduct or excretory functions (Note: The syllabus of the case mentions only sexual conduct, but excretory functions are explicitly mentioned on page 25 of the majority opinion.) specifically defined by applicable state law,
- Whether the work, taken as a whole, lacks serious literary, artistic, political or scientific value.

Chief Justice Warren E. Burger, writing for the majority, included the following definitions of what may be "patently offensive":

- "Representations or descriptions of ultimate sex acts normal or perverted, actual or simulated."
- "Representations or descriptions of masturbation, excretory functions, and lewd exhibitions of the genitals."
