= Paris Adult Theatre I v. Slaton =

- Supreme Court of the United States

Argued October 19, 1972 Decided June 21, 1973
- Full case name: Paris Adult Theatre I et al., Petitioners, v. Lewis R. Slaton, District Attorney, Atlanta Judicial Circuit, et al.
- Citations: 413 U.S. 49 (more) 93 S. Ct. 2628; 37 L. Ed. 2d 446

Holding
- A civil injunction barring the theatres in question from showing adult films was upheld; however, the State's definitions of obscene material must be re-evaluated in light of recent jurisprudence.

Court membership
- Chief Justice Warren E. Burger Associate Justices William O. Douglas · William J. Brennan Jr. Potter Stewart · Byron White; Thurgood Marshall · Harry Blackmun; Lewis F. Powell Jr. · William Rehnquist

Case opinions
- Majority: Burger, joined by White, Blackmun, Powell, Rehnquist
- Dissent: Douglas
- Dissent: Brennan, joined by Stewart, Marshall

Paris Adult Theatre I v. Slaton, 413 U.S. 49 (1973), was a case in which the U.S. Supreme Court upheld a state court's injunction against the showing of obscene films in a movie theatre restricted to consenting adults. The court distinguished the case from Stanley v. Georgia, saying that the privacy of the home that was controlling in Stanley was not present in the commercial exhibition of obscene movies in a theatre.

== Subsequent developments ==
The Supreme Court issued its decision on the same day it announced its landmark ruling in Miller v. California. In the Miller decision, the Court articulated a new, three-part test for determining whether material is obscene. The Court subsequently remanded the Paris Adult Theatre I case to the Georgia courts for reconsideration using the newly established Miller standard. On remand, the Georgia Supreme Court applied the Miller test, determined that the films in question were obscene, and ordered the trial court to issue a permanent injunction to prohibit their exhibition.

== See also ==
- Comstock laws
- List of United States Supreme Court cases, volume 413
- United States obscenity law
