= A Shot at History =

2011 autobiography by Abhinav Bindra and Rohit Brijnath

A Shot at History: My Obsessive Journey to Olympic Gold
- Author: Abhinav Bindra, Rohit Brijnath
- Language: English
- Subject: Sports
- Genre: Autobiography
- Publisher: Harper Sport
- Publication date: 2011
- Publication place: India
- Media type: Print (hardcover)
- Pages: 224
- ISBN: 9789350291122

A Shot at History: My Obsessive Journey to Olympic Gold is 2011 autobiography of Indian 2008 Summer Olympics Gold medalist Abhinav Bindra. He won the medal in the 10-metre air rifle category, which made him India's first ever individual gold medalist; this victory came after he received the seventh rank at the 2004 Athens Olympics. However, due to Bindra's inexperience in writing, he co-authored the book with sportswriter Rohit Brijnath, which took them two years to complete. After it was released on October 20, 2011, at nationwide stores by Harpercollins, Union Sports minister Ajay Maken formally released the book on October 27, 2011, at a function in New Delhi. The book's subsequent Bangalore release in November 2011 was done by Rahul Dravid and went on to receive good reviews.

== Synopsis ==
In this book, Bindra tells that only hunger for success and inner desire helps anyone to achieve his or her dreams. He denies that only the best training, coaches can lead to anyone's success. In this book, he tells how various coaches helped him to become a professional shooter. Especially, he gives credit to his German coach Gabriele Bühlmann, who helped him to win a gold medal after finishing 7th in the 2004 Summer Olympics in Athens which he states as "the darkest hour in his career". He says that how he drew inspiration from shooters like Gagan Narang, Samaresh Jung, Jaspal Rana and Anjali Bhagwat. The book also highlights the unique situation faced by an Olympic contestant. He says that a cricketer or a Professional golfer has many matches or tournaments to prove himself in a single year if he fails in one, but an Olympian has to wait 4 long years to prove himself if he fails once.
