= Sugarman v. Dougall =

- Supreme Court of the United States

Argued January 8, 1973 Decided June 25, 1973
- Full case name: Sugarman v. Dougall
- Citations: 413 U.S. 634 (more) 93 S. Ct. 2842; 37 L. Ed. 2d 853; 1973 U.S. LEXIS 147; 5 Fair Empl. Prac. Cas. (BNA) 1152; 6 Empl. Prac. Dec. (CCH) ¶ 8682

Case history
- Prior: 339 F. Supp. 906 (affirmed)

Holding
- Section 53 of the New York Civil Service Law violates the Equal Protection Clause of the Fourteenth Amendment.

Court membership
- Chief Justice Warren E. Burger Associate Justices William O. Douglas · William J. Brennan Jr. Potter Stewart · Byron White; Thurgood Marshall · Harry Blackmun; Lewis F. Powell Jr. · William Rehnquist

Case opinions
- Majority: Blackmun, joined by Burger, Douglas, Brennan, Stewart, White, Marshall, and Powell
- Dissent: Rehnquist

Laws applied
- U.S. Constitution amendment XIV

Sugarman v. Dougall, 413 U.S. 634 (1973), was a United States Supreme Court decision holding that a state law restricting certain civil service jobs to citizens violated the Equal Protection Clause of the Fourteenth Amendment because it "swep[t] indiscriminately". Plaintiffs were federally registered resident aliens. They sued when, because of their alienage, they were discharged from their competitive civil service positions with New York City. Respondents challenged the constitutionality of N.Y. Civil Service Law § 53, which denied all aliens the right to hold positions in New York's classified competitive civil service. Respondents sought a declaration that the statute was invalid under U.S. Constitution amendments I and XIV, injunctive relief, and damages for lost earnings.

The Court affirmed the lower court's decision and determined that aliens as a class were a prime example of a discrete and insular minority. Classifications based on alienage were subject to close judicial scrutiny. The Court looked to the substantially of the state's interest in enforcing the statute and to the narrowness of the limits within which the discrimination was confined. The Court concluded that § 53 was unconstitutional.

== Background ==
=== New York statute ===
Section 53 of the New York Civil Service Law provides that only United States citizens may hold permanent positions in the competitive class of the state civil service. N.Y. Civil Service Law § 53. Specifically:

- Section 53 (1) of the New York Civil Service Law reads:

"Except as herein otherwise provided, no person shall be eligible for appointment for any position in the competitive class [***856] unless he is a citizen of the United States." n1

The restriction has its statutory source in Laws of New York, 1939, c. 767, § 1. The legislation was declarative of an administrative practice that had existed for many years. (Tr. of Oral Arg. 43, 45.)

- Section 53 (2) of N.Y. Civil Service Law (Supp. 1972–1973) makes a temporary exception to the citizenship requirement:

"2. Notwithstanding any of the provisions of this chapter or of any other law, whenever a department head or appointing authority deems that an acute shortage of employees exists in any particular class or classes of positions by reason of a lack of a sufficient number of qualified personnel available for recruitment, he may present evidence thereof to the state or municipal civil service commission having jurisdiction which, after due inquiry, may determine the existence of such shortage and waive the citizenship requirement for appointment to such class or classes of positions. The state commission or such municipal commission, as the case may be, shall annually review each such waiver of the citizenship requirement, and shall revoke any such waiver whenever it finds that a shortage no longer exists. A non-citizen appointed pursuant to the provisions of this section shall not be eligible for continued employment unless he diligently prosecutes the procedures for citizenship."

The Court noted that an appointment under this exception permits the alien to continue his employment only until, on annual review, it is deemed that "a shortage no longer exists." And, in any event, the alien "shall not be eligible for continued employment unless he diligently prosecutes the procedures for citizenship."

=== Plaintiffs/Appellants ===
Four federally registered resident aliens, having been discharged from their competitive civil service positions with the City of New York because of the provisions of 53 of the New York Civil Service Law barring any person from the competitive class "unless he is a citizen of the United States," sued for declaratory and injunctive relief against enforcement of the statute.

The four respondents, Patrick McL. Dougall, Esperanza Jorge, Teresa Vargas, and Sylvia Castro, are federally registered resident aliens. Because of their alienage, they were discharged in 1971 from their competitive civil service positions with the city of New York

Prior to December 28, 1970, the respondents were employed by nonprofit organizations that received funds through HRA from the United States Office of Economic Opportunity. These supportive funds ceased to be available about that time and the organizations, with approximately 450 employees, including the respondents and 16 other non-citizens, were absorbed by the Manpower Career and Development Agency (MCDA) of HRA. The appellant Administrator advised the transferees that they would be employed by the city. (Section 45 of the New York Civil Service Law, applicable to employees of a private institution acquired by the State or a public agency, contains a restriction, similar to that in § 53 (1), against the employment of an alien in a position classified in the competitive class.) The respondents in fact were so employed in MCDA. In February, however, they were informed that they were ineligible for employment by the city and that they would be dismissed under the statutory mandate of § 53 (1). Shortly thereafter, they were discharged from MCDA solely because of their alienage. (The appellants in their answer alleged that respondent Castro was terminated for the additional reason that she lacked sufficient experience to qualify for the position of senior human resources technician. App. 49. The three-judge court in its order, App. 93, excluded respondent Castro from the recognized class. That exclusion is not contested here.)

=== Defendants/Respondents ===
The named defendants, and appellants here, were the Administrator of the city's Human Resources Administration (HRA), and the city's Director of Personnel and Chairman of its Civil Service Commission.

=== Claim ===
The respondents instituted this class action challenging the constitutionality of § 53.

The respondents sought (1) a declaration that the statute was invalid under the First and Fourteenth Amendments, (2) injunctive relief against any refusal, on the ground of alienage, to appoint and employ the respondents, and all persons similarly situated, in civil service positions in the competitive class, and (3) damages for lost earnings.

=== District Court ===
A defense motion to dismiss for want of jurisdiction was denied by Judge Tenney, 330 F.Supp. 265 (SDNY 1971).

A three-judge court was convened.

That court ruled that the statute was violative of the Fourteenth Amendment and the Supremacy Clause, and granted injunctive relief. 339 F.Supp. 906 (SDNY 1971). In reaching its conclusion that § 53 was unconstitutional under the Fourteenth Amendment, it placed primary reliance on the Supreme Court's decisions in Graham v. Richardson, 403 U.S. 365 (1971), and Takahashi v. Fish Comm'n, 334 U.S. 410 (1948), and, to an extent, on Purdy & Fitzpatrick v. State, 71 Cal. 2d 566, 456 P. 2d 645 (1969). On the basis of these cases, the court also concluded that § 53 was in conflict with Congress' comprehensive regulation of immigration and naturalization because, in effect, it denied respondents entrance to, and abode in, New York. Accordingly, the court held, § 53 encroached upon an exclusive federal power and was constitutionally impermissible under Art. VI, cl. 2, of the Constitution.

The court found jurisdiction in the Civil Rights Statutes, 28 U. S. C. §§ 1343 (3) and (4). 339 F.Supp. 906, 907 n. 5. It held that the suit was properly maintainable as a class action and defined the class as consisting of "all permanent resident aliens residing in New York State who, but for the enforcement of Section 53, would otherwise be eligible to compete for employment in the competitive class of Civil Service." Id., at 907 n. 4.

Judge Lumbard joined the court's opinion and judgment, but wrote separately in concurrence. Id., at 911. Probable jurisdiction was noted. 407 U.S. 908 (1972).

== Opinion of the court ==
Affirmed. Justice Blackmun wrote for an 8-1 Court.

The Court affirmed the lower court's decision and determined that aliens as a class were a prime example of a discrete and insular minority. Classifications based on alienage were subject to close judicial scrutiny. The Court looked to the substantiality of the state's interest in enforcing the statute and to the narrowness of the limits within which the discrimination was confined. The Court concluded that § 53 was unconstitutional.

Held:

1. Section 53 violates the Equal Protection Clause of the Fourteenth Amendment since, in the context of New York's statutory civil service scheme, it sweeps indiscriminately and is not narrowly limited to the accomplishment of substantial state interests. 413 U.S. 634, 638 (1973)

2. The "special public interest" doctrine has no applicability in this case. 413 U.S. 634, 643 (1973)

3. Nor can the citizenship requirement be justified on the unproved premise that aliens are less permanent employees than citizens, or on other grounds asserted by appellants. 413 U.S. 634, 645 (1973)

4. While the State has an interest in defining its political community, and a corresponding interest in establishing the qualifications for persons holding state elective or important non-elective executive, legislative, and judicial positions, the broad citizenship requirement established by § 53 cannot be justified on this basis. 413 U.S. 634, 646 (1973)

== Dissent ==
Justice Rehnquist dissented on the ground that the Fourteenth Amendment does not protect minorities other than racial minorities.

== See also ==
- List of United States Supreme Court cases, volume 413
