= New York State Department of Social Services v. Dublino =

New York State Dept. of Social Servs. v. Dublino
- Supreme Court of the United States

Argued April 17–18, 1973 Decided June 21, 1973
- Full case name: New York State Department of Social Services et al. v. Dublino et al.
- Citations: 413 U.S. 405 (more) 93 S. Ct. 2507; 37 L. Ed. 2d 688

Holding
- In enacting the Work Incentive Program (WIN) Congress did not intend and therefore the Court did not find that the federal WIN program preempted a similar New York State statute.

Court membership
- Chief Justice Warren E. Burger Associate Justices William O. Douglas · William J. Brennan Jr. Potter Stewart · Byron White; Thurgood Marshall · Harry Blackmun; Lewis F. Powell Jr. · William Rehnquist

Case opinions
- Majority: Powell, joined by Burger, Douglas, Stewart, White, Blackmun, Rehnquist
- Dissent: Marshall, joined by Brennan

Laws applied
- Work Incentive Program (WIN), part of the Social Security Act of 1935, 42 U.S.C. 630; New York Work Rules, N.Y. Soc. Serv. Law §131.

New York State Dept. of Social Servs. v. Dublino, 413 U.S. 405 (1973), was a Supreme Court of the United States case that primarily dealt with the issue of post-enactment legislative history.

== Background ==
The case involved the interaction of a New York state law and a provision of the federal Social Security Act. In 1967 an amendment to the Social Security Act was passed that mandated that states had to incorporate a new program, the Work Incentive Program (WIN), into their existing state Aid to Families with Dependent Children plans. The New York law in question was the New York Work Rules which were enacted in 1971 that mandated various conditions for unemployed New Yorkers to continue receiving public assistance. Recipients of public assistance in New York sued claiming that the Work Rules were preempted by the federal WIN provision of the Social Security Act.

== Decision ==
In overturning the New York District Court's ruling that the New York statute was preempted by the federal statute the Supreme Court relied heavily on legislative history. The Court found persuasive the legislative debates that occurred after the District Court's ruling in which senators and representatives stated that they did not believe that Congress had intended for the federal statute to preempt the state statute. The legislators felt that as long as state courts did not contravene federal law then states were free to operate their programs as supplementary to WIN.

The Court reasoned that if Congress had intended for the federal statute to preempt any future state plans for employment then they would have expressed that intention expressly and in “direct and unambiguous language.” The Court found no manifestation of congressional intent for the federal statute to preempt state statutes.

Finally, the majority opinion also found persuasive that the Department of Health, Education, and Welfare (HEW) is the government agency that administers the Social Security Act and that agency never considered the WIN statute to preempt state laws. HEW, as the legislators suggested in the floor debates, routinely approved state laws such as New York's Work Rules as long as the requirements were not arbitrary or unreasonable. Quoting Red Lion Broadcasting Co. v. FCC, 395 U.S. 367 at 381, the Court stated that “the construction of a statute by those charged with its execution should be followed unless there are compelling indications that it is wrong...” The Court found no indication that HEW was wrong to approve state programs.

== Post-Enactment Legislative History ==
This case is important for its use of post-enactment statutory interpretation. This type of legislative history is most commonly used by courts to determine what the congress who enacted the statute intended to include or not include in the statutory language; thus, it is a record of what occurred before the statute was enacted. The Court's analysis centered heavily on Congressional debates about WIN that occurred after the statute had been passed.

== Subsequent History ==
The WIN program was repealed by Congress on October 13, 1988.
