= Committee for Public Education v. Nyquist =

- Supreme Court of the United States

Argued April 16, 1973 Decided June 25, 1973
- Full case name: Committee for Public Education v. Nyquist
- Citations: 413 U.S. 756 (more)

Case history
- Prior: Committee for Public Education v. Nyquist, 350 F. Supp. 655 (S.D. NY. 1972)

Holding
- New York maintenance and repair grants to nonpublic schools, and tuition reimbursements and tax credits fail the effect test and violate the Establishment Clause.

Court membership
- Chief Justice Warren E. Burger Associate Justices William O. Douglas · William J. Brennan Jr. Potter Stewart · Byron White; Thurgood Marshall · Harry Blackmun; Lewis F. Powell Jr. · William Rehnquist

Case opinions
- Majority: Powell, joined by Douglas, Brennan, Stewart, Marshall, Blackmun
- Concur/dissent: Rehnquist joined by White, Burger

Laws applied
- U.S. Const. amend. I

Committee for Public Education v. Nyquist, 413 U.S. 756 (1973), was a United States Supreme Court case which held New York state policies providing repair and maintenance grants to non-public schools, and tuition reimbursement or tax credits to parents of students were Establishment Clause violations. The Court found that the three New York State programs failed the primary effect prong of the Lemon test.

== Background ==
Three programs providing financial aid to non-public schools were established under several amendments to New York State law in May 1972 providing "maintenance and repair" grants to schools, and tuition reimbursement or tax benefits to parents.

A taxpayer complaint was soon filed in the Southern District of New York claiming the programs violated the Establishment Clause. The district court upheld the constitutionality of the tax benefit but agreed that the direct money grants and tuition reimbursement violated the Establishment Clause. The plaintiffs (appellants) appealed directly to the Supreme Court. (Note: Committee for Public Education v. Nyquist, 413 U.S. 756, 769)

== Legal history ==
Several cases decided before Lemon v. Kurtzman had upheld the constitutionality of various provisions that were challenged on Establishment grounds. In these cases the Court considered the benefits to the religious organization were "indirect" or "incidental". (Note: Walz v. Tax Comm'n, 397 U.S. 664)

Everson v. Board of Education was the first Supreme Court case that heard a challenge to a state law on Establishment grounds. Justice Hugo Black writing for the majority in Everson upheld a New Jersey state law that reimbursed the parents of parochial school students for transportation costs.

The reimbursement to parents provided only an indirect benefit to the schools and student bus fares were "indisputably marked off from religious function". (Note: Everson v. Board of Education, 330 U.S. 1, 24 (1947))

== Supreme Court ==
All three of the Lemon criteria must be met for a law to be upheld against an Establishment Clause challenge. First, the Court determines whether there is a legitimate secular purpose for the legislation such as a state interest in the general welfare of students. If the Court finds a legitimate secular purpose, the law may still be unconstitutional if the primary effect advances religion or results in excessive entanglement between government and religious orders. (Note: Nyquist, 413 U.S. at 774) In Nyquist all three provisions failed the second "primary effect" prong. There was no entanglement analysis.

=== Majority decision ===
Writing for the majority, Justice Lewis Powell recognized as valid the legislative findings of the statute for all three programs, including the interest in "promoting pluralism and diversity" of school choice.

The "maintenance and repair" expenditures were not restricted by statue and "virtually all" of the recipients were Roman Catholic schools in low-income areas. Distinguishing Everson, Allen and Tilton, the Court found that without restricting the grants to exclusively secular facilities the law "has a primary effect that advances religion in that it subsidizes directly the religious activities of sectarian elementary and secondary schools." (Note: Nyquist, 413 U.S. at 774)

The Court found that the tuition reimbursement program failed the effect prong for similar reasons: (Note: Nyquist, 413 U.S. at 780)

In the absence of an effective means of guaranteeing that the state aid derived from public funds will be used exclusively for secular, neutral, and non ideological purposes, it is clear from our cases that direct aid in whatever form is invalid.

Even though parents were reimbursed directly for tuition costs the Court distinguished Everson and Allen: "the fact that aid is distributed to parents rather than schools is only one among many factors to be considered". (Note: Nyquist, 413 U.S. at 781)

The Court ruled against the tax benefit program for the same reason: the program was not "sufficiently restricted to assure that it will not have the impermissible effect of advancing the sectarian activities of religious schools." (Note: Nyquist, 413 U.S. at 784)

== See also ==
- Walz v. Tax Comm'n, upholding tax exemptions for religious properties.

== Sources ==
- Dry, Murray (2004). Civil Peace and the Quest for Truth: The First Amendment Freedoms in Political Philosophy and American Constitutionalism. Lexington Books. ISBN 978-0-7391-5305-5.
- Finkelman, Paul (2003). Religion and American Law: An Encyclopedia. Routledge. ISBN 978-1-136-91956-5.
- Meyer, Bernard S.; Agata, Burton C.; Agata, Seth H. (2006). The History of the New York Court of Appeals: 1932-2003. Columbia University Press. ISBN 978-0-231-50990-9.
