= Rohit Brijnath =

Indian sports journalist

- Occupation: Sports journalist
- Notable work: A Shot at History: My Obsessive Journey to Olympic Gold (co-authored with Abhinav Bindra)

Rohit David Brijnath is a veteran Indian sports journalist. Early in his career, Brijnath was a key member of the now-defunct weekly magazine Sportsworld, where he wrote alongside young journalists such as Mudar Patherya and Andy O'Brien. He has also worked for India Today and has written a recurring sports column for the BBC News website since 2004. He has also written for the Indian publication The Sportstar. He currently resides in Singapore with his wife, where he writes for the Straits Times. He also has a column called 'Game Theory' in the Indian publication 'Mint'.

He has co-authored the biography of Indian shooter Abhinav Bindra titled A Shot at History: My Obsessive Journey to Olympic Gold, published in 2011.

Indian commentator 'Harsha Bhogle' has referred to him as the 'best Indian sportswriter by a long margin'.
