= Abhinav Bindra =

Indian businessman and retired professional shooter (born 1982)

Abhinav Bindra OLY
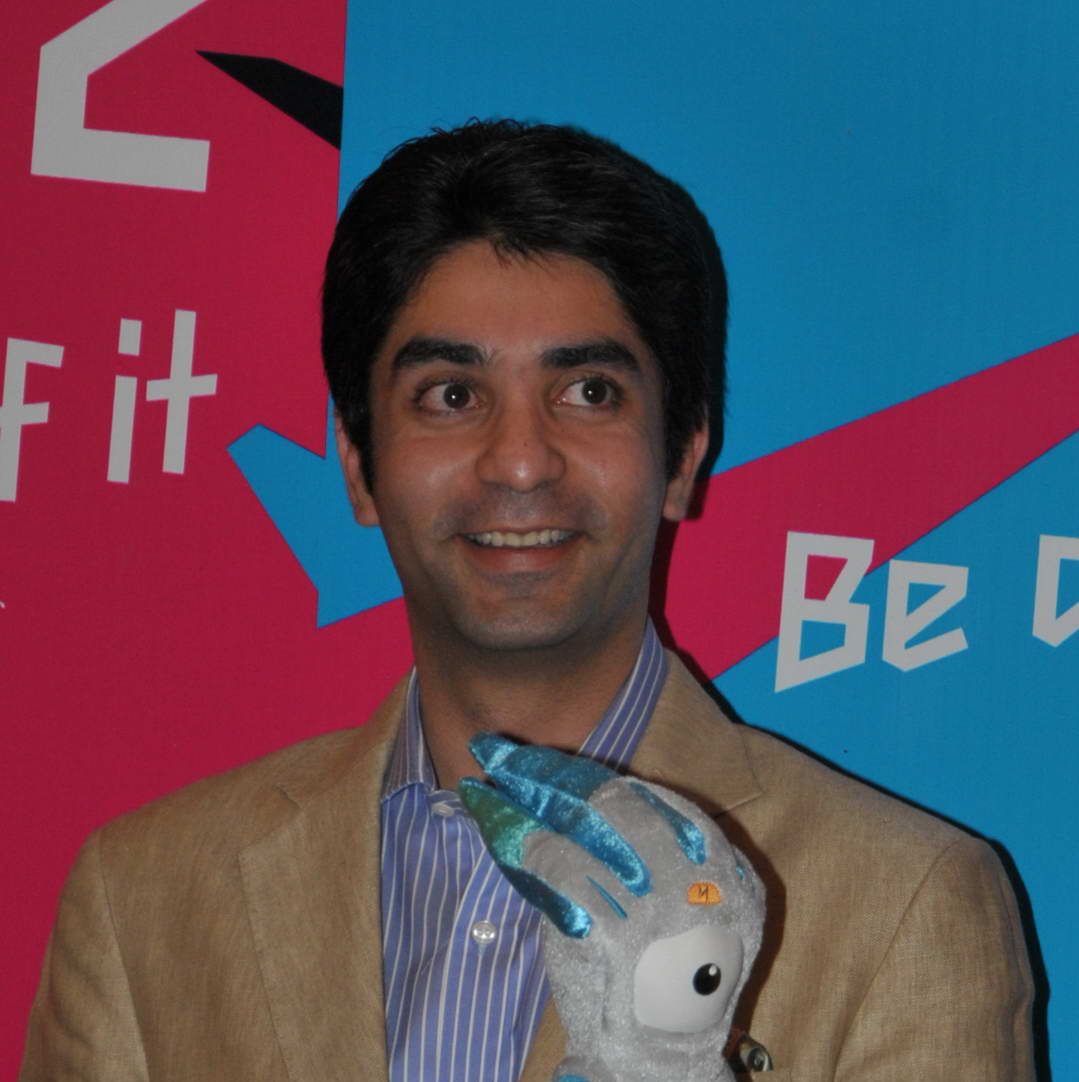
- Bindra in 2011

Personal information
- Born: 28 September 1982 (age 44) Dehradun, Uttarakhand, India
- Education: The Doon School; St. Stephen's School; University of Colorado at Boulder
- Occupations: Shooter; Businessman
- Height: 1.73 m (5 ft 8 in)
- Weight: 65.5 kg (144 lb)

Military service
- Allegiance: India
- Branch/service: Indian Army
- Years of service: 2011–present
- Rank: Honorary Lieutenant Colonel
- Unit: Territorial Army

Sport
- Country: India
- Sport: Shooting
Medal record
Men's shooting
Representing India
Event	1st	2nd	3rd
Olympic Games	1	–	–
World Championships	1	–	–
Asian Games	–	1	2
Commonwealth Games	4	2	1
Total	6	3	3
Olympic Games
Gold medal – first place	2008 Beijing	10 m air rifle
World Championships
Gold medal – first place	2006 Zagreb	10 m Air Rifle
Commonwealth Games
Gold medal – first place	2002 Manchester	10 m Air Rifle (Pairs)
Gold medal – first place	2006 Melbourne	10 m Air Rifle (Pairs)
Gold medal – first place	2010 Delhi	10 m Air Rifle (Pairs)
Gold medal – first place	2014 Glasgow	10 m Air Rifle
Silver medal – second place	2002 Manchester	10 m Air Rifle (Singles)
Silver medal – second place	2010 Delhi	10 m Air Rifle
Bronze medal – third place	2006 Melbourne	10 m Air Rifle (Singles)
Asian Games
Silver medal – second place	2010 Guangzhou	10 m Air Rifle (Team)
Bronze medal – third place	2014 Incheon	10 m Air Rifle (Team)
Bronze medal – third place	2014 Incheon	Men's 10 m Air Rifle

Abhinav Bindra (born 28 September 1982) is an Indian former sport shooter and a businessman. He is an Olympic gold medalist as well as the first and one of only two Indians to win an individual Olympic gold medal. Bindra is also the first Indian to have held concurrently the World and Olympic titles for the men's 10-metre air rifle event, having earned those honours at the 2008 Summer Olympics and the 2006 World Championships. Bindra has won seven medals at the Commonwealth Games and three medals at the Asian Games.

With more than 150 medals in his 22-year career, he is the recipient of the Padma Bhushan from the Government of India and is one of the top influencers of sport policy in the country.

At the 2016 Summer Olympics in Rio de Janeiro, Bindra finished fourth in the finals of the 10-metre air rifle event. He also served as a goodwill ambassador for the Rio 2016 Olympics Indian contingent, having been appointed to that post by the Indian Olympics Association (IOA). On 5 September 2016, he announced his retirement. Bindra's primary outreach to Indian sports is through the Abhinav Bindra Foundation, a non-profit organisation that works to integrate sports, science, and technology into Indian sports and encourage high-performance physical training.

In 2018, Abhinav was bestowed with the prestigious Blue Cross, the ISSF's highest honour. He is also currently a member of the IOC Athletes' Commission. Bindra carried the Olympic torch at the 2024 Summer Olympics in Paris.

== Career ==
=== Early years ===
Abhinav Bindra was born in Dehradun in Uttarakhand, to a Punjabi Sikh Khatri family. He was educated at the Doon School in Dehradun and at St. Stephen's School in Chandigarh. He studied business administration at the University of Colorado Boulder. Determined to train with the best possible facilities, which were then not available in India, he would train for prolonged periods in Germany, where he was coached by Gaby Buhlmann.

=== Notable international performances ===
At the age of 15, Bindra was the youngest participant in the 1998 Commonwealth Games. He was also the youngest Indian participant at the 2000 Summer Olympics in Sydney. At the 2000 Olympics, he achieved a score of 590, placing him 11th in the qualification round. With that score, he was not able to qualify for the finals. He was also honoured with the Arjuna Award that year.

In international competitions, he won his first medal, a bronze, at the 2001 Munich World Cup with a new junior world record score of 597/600. He won six gold medals at various international meets that year and received the prestigious Major Dhyan Chand Khel Ratna award, India's highest sports award. In the air rifle event at the 2002 Commonwealth Games in Manchester, he finished with gold in the pairs event and silver in the individual event.

In the 2004 Summer Olympics in Athens, he broke the previous Olympic record but did not win a medal. He scored 597 in the qualification round and placed third, preceded by Qinan Zhu (599, a new Olympic record) and Li Jie (598). In the finals, Abhinav finished with 97.6 points, last in the field of eight; he was the only player with less than 100 points and dropped to the seventh position.

After these successes, a severe back injury incapacitated him and he was unable to lift a rifle for a year, interrupting his preparation for the 2008 Summer Olympics. Bindra returned to compete and won the title at the 2006 ISSF World Shooting Championships with a score of 699.1, qualifying him for the 2008 Summer Olympics.

At the 2008 Summer Olympics in Beijing, Bindra won the men's 10-metre air rifle event, shooting a total of 700.5. He scored 596 in the qualifying round, finishing fourth, and outscored all other shooters in the finals with a round of 104.5. In the finals, he started with a shot of 10.7, and all others never dipped below 10.0. Bindra was tied with Henri Häkkinen heading into his final shot. Bindra scored his highest of the finals – 10.8 – while Hakkinen shot 9.7 to settle for the bronze medal.

At the 2010 Commonwealth Games in New Delhi, Bindra was honoured as the national flag-bearer at the opening ceremony. He also was given the honour of taking the athletes' oath on behalf of the 6,700 participants from 71 countries and territories. Bindra, along with Gagan Narang, shot in unison to set a games record of 1,193 points in the 10-metre air rifle pairs event for men to win India's inaugural gold medal at the 19th Commonwealth Games. He brought home a silver medal in the individual event.

Bindra won the gold medal in the men's 10-metre air rifle event at the 12th Asian Shooting Championships, held in Doha, Qatar. He lost in the qualification round at the 2012 Summer Olympics in London, finishing in the 16th place with a score of 594. In the 2014 Commonwealth Games in Glasgow, Bindra again won gold in the men's 10-metre air rifle singles event. At the 2016 Summer Olympics in Rio de Janeiro, he came fourth in the men's 10-metre air rifle singles event after losing a shoot-off for the top 3 to Serhiy Kulish, who eventually won the silver medal.

=== Business career ===
Bindra has a bachelor's degree in business administration from the University of Colorado. Bindra is the CEO of Abhinav Futuristics Private Limited, an organisation that works to bring science and technology into the sport and healthcare sectors. With ABTP, a group of sports science and advanced physical medicine and rehabilitation (PMR) centres, the organisation has served more than 5,000 athletes and medical patients. Under the Abhinav Bindra Foundation, a non-profit initiative, athletes are provided access to the latest sports technology and high-performance physical training for free. Many athletes from sports such as swimming, badminton, boxing, and para-athletics have benefited from the foundation's various programmes. In 2020, he launched the Abhinav Bindra Sports Medicine and Research Institute at Bhubaneswar with the mission of bringing Global Best Practice to the Indian Healthcare and Sports Medicine Sector.

Since his retirement, Bindra has been involved with the TOP Scheme, one of India's most significant policies for athlete development. He was a member of the ISSF Athlete Committee from 2010 to 2020, serving as Chair from 2014, and was appointed to the IOC Athlete Commission in 2018. In these roles he has worked for the development of athletes through mental health, financial stability, and entrepreneurship initiatives. In 2017 whilst Chair of the ISSF Athletes Committee, Bindra was criticised for approving the removal of three events from the Olympic programme in what was described as an undemocratic and un-transparent manner. Bindra's net worth is estimated to be around $10 million.

== Summer Olympics ==
Year	Event	Rank	Notes
(Australia) 2000 Sydney	10 m air rifle	11	590
(Greece) 2004 Athens	10 m air rifle	7	694.6
(China) 2008 Beijing	10 m air rifle	1st place, gold medalist(s)	700.5
(United Kingdom) 2012 London	10 m air rifle	16	594
(Brazil) 2016 Rio de Janeiro	10 m air rifle	4	625.7/163.8

== Personal life ==
Harper Sport published Bindra's autobiography, A Shot at History: My Obsessive Journey to Olympic Gold, which he co-authored with sportswriter Rohit Brijnath in October 2011. It was formally released by Union Sports Minister Ajay Maken on 27 October 2011, at a function in New Delhi. The book received positive reviews, and Harshvardhan Kapoor has been cast for the lead role in a future biopic based on the memoir.

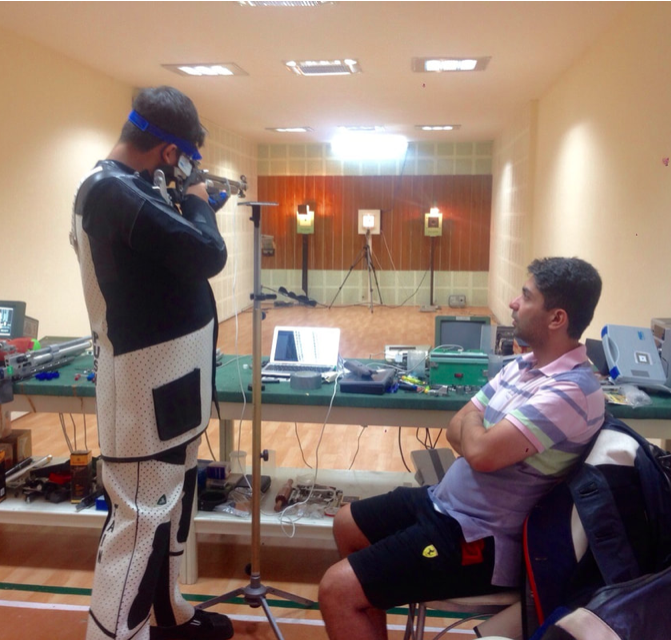
Abhinav Bindra Coaching

Bindra belongs to a Sikh family and a descendant of legendary warrior Hari Singh Nalwa, who was commander-in-chief of the Sikh army during Maharaja Ranjit Singh's reign.

== Awards and accolades ==
- 2000 – Arjuna award
- 2002 – Major Dhyan Chand Khel Ratna (India's highest sports award)
- 2008 − Honorary doctorate (D.Litt) from SRM University
- 2009 – Padma Bhushan
- 2011 – Made an honorary lieutenant colonel by the Indian Territorial Army
- 2018 – Blue Cross, highest shooting honour by International Shooting Sport Federation
- 2019 – Honorary doctorate (DPhil) from Kaziranga University
- 2024 – Olympic Order, highest honour by the International Olympic Committee

Awards for 2008 Olympic gold medal

- ₹15 million (US$160,000) by Mittal Champions Trust
- ₹5 million (US$53,000) cash prize from the Indian Central Government
- ₹2.5 million (US$27,000) cash prize by the state government of Haryana
- ₹2.5 million (US$27,000) cash prize by the Board of Control for Cricket in India
- ₹1.5 million (US$16,000) cash prize by the Steel Ministry of India
- ₹1.1 million (US$12,000) cash prize by the state government of Bihar. The Patna Indoor Stadium will be renamed after Bindra.
- ₹1 million (US$11,000) prize by the state government of Karnataka
- ₹1 million (US$11,000) cash prize by S. Amolak Singh Gakhal, chairman, Gold's Gym
- ₹1 million (US$11,000) cash prize by the chief minister of Maharashtra state
- ₹500,000 (US$5,300) cash prize by the state government of Orissa
- ₹500,000 (US$5,300) cash prize by government of Tamil Nadu
- ₹100,000 (US$1,100) cash prize by the state government of Chhattisgarh
- ₹100,000 (US$1,100) cash prize by the state government of Madhya Pradesh
- A free lifetime railway pass by the Railway Ministry of India
- A gold medal by the state government of Kerala

== Bibliography ==
- Bindra, Abhinav; Brijnath, Rohit (2011). A Shot at History: My Obsessive Journey to Olympic Gold. HarperCollins India. ISBN 9789350291122.

== See also ==
- Sport in India – Overview of sports in India
- Shooting sports in India
- Shooting at the Summer Olympics

Olympic Games
Preceded by Sushil Kumar	Flagbearer for India; Rio de Janeiro 2016	Succeeded by Mary Kom & Manpreet Singh
