= Cady v. Dombrowski =

- Supreme Court of the United States

Argued March 2, 1973 Decided June 21, 1973
- Full case name: Elmer O. Cady, Warden v. Chester J. Dombrowski
- Citations: 413 U.S. 433 (more)

Case history
- Prior: Certiorari to the United States Court of Appeals for the Seventh Circuit

Holding
- A warrantless inventory search of a vehicle under police custody for being a hazard on the highway, and whose owner was heavily intoxicated to the point of comatose unconsciousness, was reasonable and not prohibited by the Fourth Amendment. The search for weapons inside the car also served a purpose to preserve public safety. Subsequent seizure of items inside a vehicle described in a search warrant upheld as valid.

Court membership
- Chief Justice Warren E. Burger Associate Justices William O. Douglas · William J. Brennan Jr. Potter Stewart · Byron White; Thurgood Marshall · Harry Blackmun; Lewis F. Powell Jr. · William Rehnquist

Case opinions
- Majority: Rehnquist, joined by Blackmun, Powell, White, Burger
- Dissent: Brennan, joined by Douglas, Stewart, Marshall

Laws applied
- U.S. Const. amend. IV

Cady v. Dombrowski, 413 U.S. 433 (1973), was a United States Supreme Court case that introduced the community caretaking doctrine. Under the Fourth Amendment, "unreasonable" searches and seizures are forbidden. In addition to their law-enforcement duties, the police must engage in what the court has termed a community caretaking role, including the removal of obstructions from roadways to ensure the free flow of traffic. If either the vehicle is incapable of being driven or the owner is unavailable to claim it, they may inventory those vehicles they have seized without "unreasonably" searching those cars as long as proper procedures are followed.

== Facts of the case ==
Chester J. Dombrowski, a Chicago police officer drove to West Bend, Wisconsin on September 9, 1969, in a 1960 Dodge car. After visiting two taverns in Kewaskum on the 9th and the early morning of the 10th, his Dodge became disabled at noon. Dombrowski had the Dodge towed to his brother's farm in Fond du Lac County. Then, he drove back to Chicago with his brother.

Shortly before midnight, Dombrowski rented a maroon 1967 Ford Thunderbird and drove back to Wisconsin. A tenant on his brother's farm witnessed the Thunderbird pulling alongside the disabled Dodge at around September 11, 4 AM. At approximately 9:30 AM, Dombrowski purchased two towels from a Kewaskum department store.

From 7 to 10:15 PM, Dombrowski apparently drank heavily while eating dinner in a restaurant. After his meal, he broke through a guardrail and crashed into a bridge abutment while driving back to his brother's farm. A passing motorist then picked him up, drove him to Kewaskum, and telephoned the local police. Eventually, the officers encountered Dombrowski at a bar and drove him to the accident scene. While driving, the officers took note of his appearance and how he offered three conflicting versions of the accident's timeline. As the officers observed the Thunderbird and began their investigation, Dombrowski stated his law enforcement status. Believing that he possessed a revolver as part of his standard equipment, the officers frisked him but found nothing. After calling for a tow truck, an officer looked into the front seat and searched the glove compartment to no avail. The Thunderbird was towed to a private garage seven miles from the West Bend police station, and left outside with no guard present.

Dombrowski was finally transported to the West Bend station where he reiterated his law enforcement status to the assistant district attorney. After being formally charged with drunk driving, the officers took him to a local hospital due to his injuries where he lapsed into a coma. One officer guarded Dombrowski while Officer Weiss drove to the garage on September 12 to find the revolver as "standard procedure." Arriving at the garage, Weiss opened the Thunderbird's door, finding a Chicago police regulations book on the floor and a flashlight "with a few spots of blood" between the two front seats. Unlocking the trunk, Weiss found a pair of trousers belonging to a police uniform, a raincoat, a part of a car floor mat, a night stick with Dombrowski's name stamped on it, a pair of gray pants, and a towel covered in type O blood (with the floor mat having a moist feel).

When Dombrowski was interrogated about these items, he requested counsel prior to making a statement. Soon, the attorney relayed to the police with permission that a dead body was on his brother's farm. The Fond du Lac County Sheriff's Office entered the farm and found the body of Herbert McKinney. McKinney was naked from the waist-up, wearing only a sports shirt. His head was bloody as well. Finding a sock near the body, one deputy looked through the window of the disabled Dodge. Discovering a pillowcase, briefcase, and the back seat covered in blood, deputies obtained search warrants to fully examine both the Thunderbird and the Dodge. After criminologists from the Wisconsin Crime Laboratory took the seats, socks, briefcase, and floor mats from the Dodge on September 13, the results of the search warrant were filed in the county court on the 14th, but did not specifically mention the socks and floor mat.

Dombrowski was tried for murder based on circumstantial evidence around the seized items and convicted. He appealed to the Wisconsin Supreme Court where his conviction was upheld. However, the United States Court of Appeals for the Seventh Circuit reversed his conviction on the basis that the socks and floor mat were improperly seized.

== Decision ==
In a 5–4 decision, Justice William Rehnquist wrote for the majority that since state and local law enforcement agencies engage with vehicles more frequently than federal agents, the former take a "community caretaker" role of ensuring safe travels on public roads. Even as the majority of vehicle accidents are of a non-criminal nature, the frequent response from local police brings evidence and contraband into plain view. Furthermore, Dombrowski was incapable of making arrangements for the disabled Thunderbird, and Officer Weiss had to make sure that Dombrowski's revolver was not stolen as the car was not guarded. Differentiating from Preston v. United States (1964) where the Court upheld the suppression of bank robbery conspiracy evidence (as the defendants were initially arrested for vagrancy), the search of the Thunderbird was justified under procedure. Finally, the Dodge was a "particularly described" item in the Fond du Lac Sheriff's search warrant; thus the sock and mat could be seized under plain view. Any errors made would be rectified by the state.

=== Dissent ===
Justice William Brennan dissented, arguing that the search was not justifiable without a warrant as the vehicle was not forfeited and the officers removed it from the highway. Additionally, the officers only assumed that Dombrowski was carrying a revolver without asking him, and Officer Weiss did not look for the gun until two and a half hours after Dombrowski was formally charged.

== See also ==
- South Dakota v. Opperman
- Caniglia v. Strom
