= Miller test =

Obscenity test in U.S. law

The Miller test, also called the three-prong obscenity test, is the United States Supreme Court's test for determining whether speech or expression can be labeled obscene, in which case it is not protected by the First Amendment to the United States Constitution and can be prohibited.

== History and details ==
In Redrup v. New York, the Supreme Court decided that written materials that were not sold to minors or foisted on unwilling audiences were constitutionally protected. Afterward, the Supreme Court systematically and summarily reversed, without further opinion, scores of obscenity rulings involving paperback sex books.

The Miller test was developed in the 1973 case Miller v. California. It has three parts:

- Whether "the average person, applying contemporary community standards", would find that the work, taken as a whole, appeals to the prurient interest;
- Whether the work depicts or describes, in a patently offensive way, sexual conduct or excretory functions specifically defined by applicable state law (the syllabus of the case mentions only sexual conduct, but excretory functions are explicitly mentioned in the majority opinion);
- Whether the work, taken as a whole, lacks serious literary, artistic, political, or scientific value. (Note: This is also known as the (S)LAPS test- [Serious] Literary, Artistic, Political, Scientific.)

The work is considered obscene only if all three conditions are satisfied.

The first two prongs of the Miller test are held to the standards of the community, and the third prong is based on "whether a reasonable person would find such value in the material, taken as a whole".

For legal scholars, several issues are important. One is that the test allows for community standards rather than a national standard. What offends the average person in one community may differ from what offends the average person in another community.

Another important issue is that the Miller test asks for an interpretation of what the "average" person finds offensive, rather than what the more sensitive persons in the community are offended by, as obscenity was defined by the previous test, the Hicklin test, stemming from the English precedent.

In practice, the depiction of genitalia and sexual acts is not ipso facto obscene according to the Miller test. The first prong cannot be satisfied if the pornographic material reflects a healthy, ordinary interest in sex, rather than one that is shameful and morbid according to contemporary community standards. In an independent review by the Fifth Circuit of the January 1978 editions of Penthouse, Oui, and Playboy, the Miller test was utilized to determine whether each work classified as obscenity. Although all three magazines featured pictorials of female genitalia, only Playboy was unanimously agreed by the three judges to have failed prong one. The court's rationale was that "Nudity alone is not obscene", as declared in Jenkins v. Georgia. When evaluated as a whole, Playboy did not solely appeal to the prurient interest due to its significant amount of non-sexual content, including, but not limited to, interviews involving prominent writers such as Jean-Paul Sartre and Alex Haley, four articles about filmmaking, and two short-stories.

== Criticism ==
=== Miller test may lead to greater censorship ===
Because it allows for community standards and demands "serious" value, Justice Douglas worried in his dissent that this test would make it easier to suppress speech and expression. Miller replaced a previous test asking whether the speech or expression was "utterly without redeeming social value". As used, however, the test generally makes it difficult to outlaw any form of expression. Many works decried as pornographic have been successfully argued to have some artistic or literary value, most publicly in the context of the National Endowment for the Arts in the 1990s.

The first two prongs of the Miller test – that material appeal to the prurient interest and be patently offensive – have been said to require the impossible: "They require the audience to be turned on and grossed out at the same time".

=== Problem of jurisdiction in the Internet age ===
The advent of the Internet has made the "community standards" part of the test even more difficult to judge; as material published on a web server in one place can be read by a person residing anywhere else, there is a question as to which jurisdiction should apply. In United States v. Extreme Associates, a pornography distributor from North Hollywood, California, was judged to be held accountable to the community standards applying in western Pennsylvania, where the Third Circuit made its ruling, because the materials were available via Internet in that area. The United States Court of Appeals for the Ninth Circuit has ruled in United States v. Kilbride that a "national community standard" should be used for the Internet, but this has yet to be upheld at the national level.

== See also ==
- Artistic freedom
- Artistic merit
- Dost test
- I know it when I see it
- Literary merit
- Nitke v. Gonzales – a case involving Barbara Nitke and the National Coalition for Sexual Freedom regarding Internet obscenity
- Jack Thompson
- United States v. Extreme Associates, Inc.
