= United States v. Ash =

- Supreme Court of the United States

Decided June 21, 1973
- Full case name: United States v. Ash
- Citations: 413 U.S. 300 (more)

Holding
- The Sixth Amendment does not grant a criminal defendant the right to have counsel present when the government uses a photo array to elicit an identification of the defendant from a witness.

Court membership
- Chief Justice Warren E. Burger Associate Justices William O. Douglas · William J. Brennan Jr. Potter Stewart · Byron White; Thurgood Marshall · Harry Blackmun; Lewis F. Powell Jr. · William Rehnquist

Case opinions
- Majority: Blackmun
- Concurrence: Stewart
- Dissent: Brennan, joined by Douglas, Marshall

Laws applied
- U.S. Const. amend. VI

United States v. Ash, 413 U.S. 300 (1973), was a United States Supreme Court case in which the court held that the Sixth Amendment does not grant a criminal defendant the right to have counsel present when the government uses a photo array to elicit an identification of the defendant from a witness.
