= Lascivious behavior =

Sexual behavior or conduct that is considered crude and offensive

Lascivious behavior is sexual behavior or conduct that is considered crude and offensive, or contrary to local moral or other standards of appropriate behavior. In this sense, "lascivious" is similar in meaning to "lewd", "indecent", "lecherous", "unchaste", "licentious", "libidinous" or "lustful".

== Legal usage ==
In American legal jargon, lascivious is a semi-technical term indicating immoral sexual actions and in certain cases, words or thoughts. It is often used in the legal description of criminal acts in which some sort of sexual activity is prohibited. The legal definition of the term varies greatly across jurisdictions, and has evolved significantly over time, reflective of current moral values as they relate to sexuality.

For example, in 1896, lascivious cohabitation referred to the now-archaic crime of living with a member of the opposite sex and having premarital sex with him or her. In 2015, the laws of three states of the United States (Florida, Michigan and Mississippi) still considered "lascivious cohabitation" as a crime. In 2016, Governor Rick Scott of Florida signed into law SB 0498 which no longer makes "lascivious cohabitation" a crime. In 2023, Governor Gretchen Whitmer of Michigan signed into law SB 56 which no longer makes "lewd or lascivious cohabitation" a crime.

In the 2000s, the term is often used as one of several adjectives to describe pornography, solicitation for prostitution, and indecent acts, such as the exposure of one's genitalia in public (e.g. indecent exposure).

In American law, mailing lascivious matter is prohibited thus:

Every obscene, lewd, lascivious, indecent, filthy or vile article, matter, thing, device, or substance ... [i]s declared to be nonmailable matter and shall not be conveyed in the mails or delivered from any post office or by any letter carrier.

"Lewd and lascivious" behavior has varying definitions across jurisdictions. Indecent exposure, for example, generally refers to the exposure of one's "private parts", which, as noted in a 1992 court case, depending on the jurisdiction, may or may not include one's buttocks, female breasts, or even pubic hair. At that time, 22 states prohibited only indecent exposure of genitalia; "only three States (Indiana, Iowa, and New Mexico), would treat as indecent the intentional exposure of the genital area or pubic hair, and these jurisdictions do so by means of legislation which is explicit in its terms. It thus appears that the term 'indecent exposure' lacks a 'commonly understood meaning', when considered with respect to parts of the body other than the genitalia."

== Lechery ==
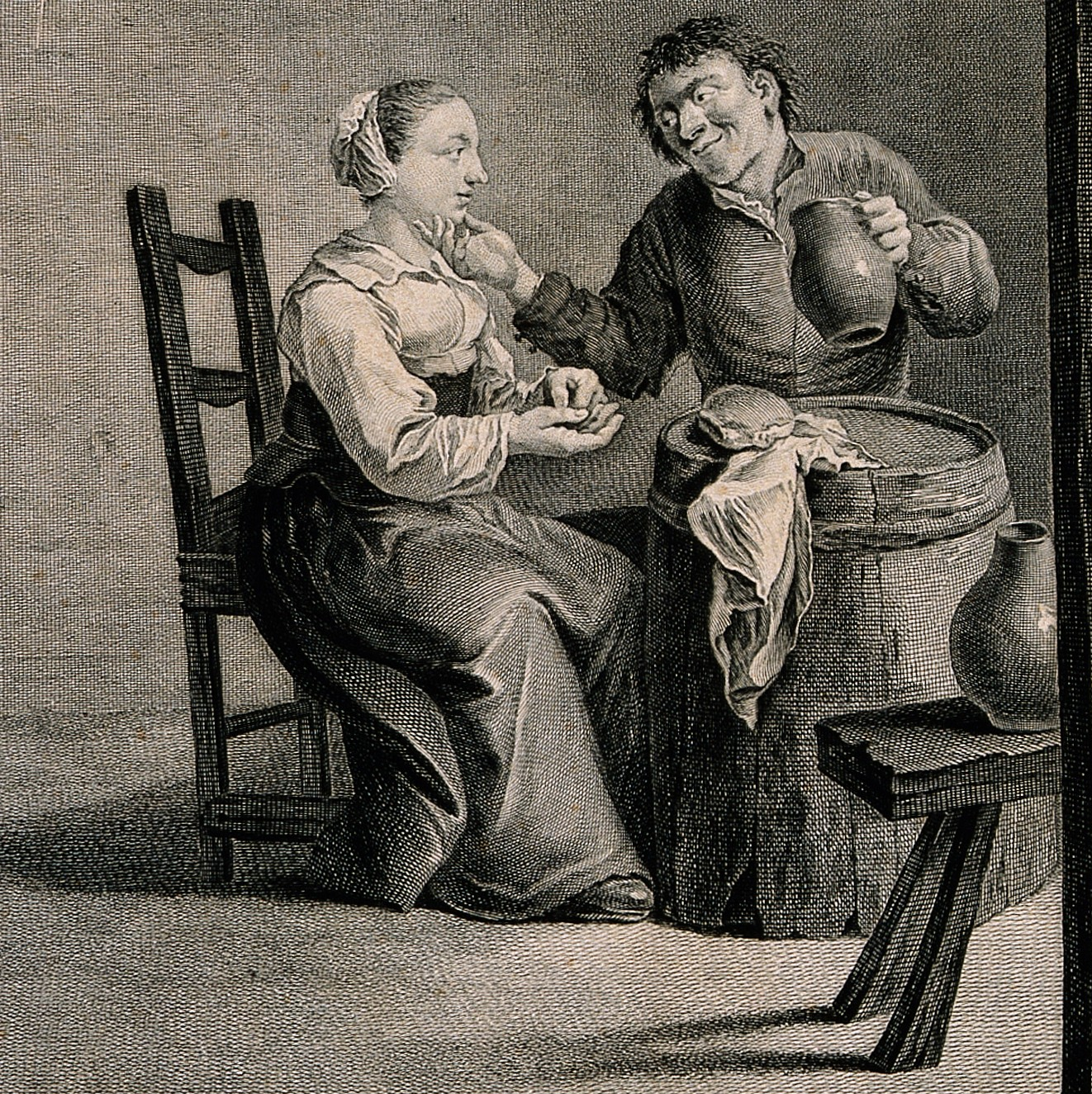
Engraving by P. Cannot, c. 1756, after D. Teniers, the younger.

Lechery is a behavioral pattern that includes:

- Inordinate indulgence in sexual activity
- Unrestrained and promiscuous sexuality
- Immoderate indulgence of sexual desire
- Lewd and lustful behavior

Lechery is not the same as lust. Lust is an interior psychological state, the thinking about sex, the desire for it. Lechery is an outward behavior, a physical manifestation or behavior pattern of an interior condition of lust. Lust does not necessarily result in the action of lechery. Someone exhibiting lechery is said to be lecherous, or simply a lecher.

== See also ==
- Indecent exposure
  - Indecent exposure in the United States
- Lust
- Mooning
- Obscenity
- Sexual misconduct
- Sexual norm
