= Barbara Roe Hicklin =

Canadian painter

- Born: Barbara Jane Roe; December 8, 1918; Toronto, Ontario, Canada
- Died: December 24, 2010 (aged 92)
- Known for: Painter
- Spouse: Hugh Hicklin

Barbara Roe Hicklin (December 8, 1918 – December 24, 2010) was a Canadian painter who, in 1975, became the first woman president of the Alberta Society of Artists.

== Biography ==
Barbara Roe Hicklin (née Barbara Jane Roe) was born in Toronto, Ontario on December 8, 1918. The Roe family moved to Jasper, Alberta in the early 1920s and then, after the death of her father, they moved back to Ontario.

Hicklin studied art in the 1930s at the Central Technical School and the Ontario College of Art and Design, both located in Toronto. In the early 1940s, Hicklin moved to New York where she studied at the New York Phoenix School of Design and she graduated in 1946. While attending school she worked as a commercial artist.

From 1951 to 1956, Hicklin worked as a theatre set designer in Sarnia, Ontario. She married Hugh Hicklin sometime after World War II.

In the late 1950s, Hicklin relocated again, this time to Edmonton, Alberta. There she took up water colour painting and joined the Alberta Society of Artists and the Edmonton Art Club.

In the mid-1970s, Hicklin outfitted a vehicle (the "Van Go") to tour the Canadian countryside in order to create watercolour landscapes. In 1980, she became a member of Canadian Society of Painters in Water Colour.

Hicklin continued her peripatetic life, crossing the country, and making several trips to the Yukon.

She died on December 24, 2010.

== Exhibitions ==
One woman shows

- Centennial Library Art Gallery, Edmonton; 1970
- Canadian Art Galleries, Calgary; 1971
- Canadian Art Galleries, Edmonton; 1973
- University of Calgary, Calgary; 1976
- Canadian Art Galleries, Calgary; 1977
- Nichols Arts Museum, Calgary; 1979

Select group exhibitions

- Alberta '73, the Edmonton Art Gallery, Edmonton; 1973
- Prairie '74, the Edmonton Art Gallery, Edmonton; 1974
- Canadian Society of Painters in Watercolor, The Glenbow-Alberta Institute, Calgary; 1976
