= Benjamin Hicklin =

British licensed carrier and solicitor

Alderman Benjamin Hicklin, JP
- Born: Benjamin Hicklin; 11 November 1816; Wolverhampton, Staffordshire, England
- Died: 16 March 1909 (aged 92); Worthing, Sussex, England
- Occupations: Solicitor, licensed carrier, farmer
- Known for: Mayor of Wolverhampton, Hicklin test

Benjamin Hicklin JP (11 November 1816 – 16 March 1909) was an English licensed carrier, farmer, solicitor and Borough Magistrate, who served as Mayor of Wolverhampton in 1859 and 1860.

== Hicklin case ==
The case centred on a Wolverhampton resident, metal broker Henry Scott, a Protestant activist, who was reselling anti-catholic pamphlets obtained from London. The pamphlet The Confessional Unmasked: Shewing the Depravity of the Romanish Priesthood, the Iniquity of the Confessional, and the Questions Put to Females in Confession put out by the Protestant Electoral Union which contained sections which appeared to contravene the recently enacted Obscene Publications Act 1857. The borough Watch Committee directed a police officer to bring a complaint before two justices of the borough, Hicklin being one of the justices. They issued a warrant for seizure and destruction of the pamphlets and 252 pamphlets were seized. On 26 May 1867 Scott appealed the order at the borough quarter sessions. The recorder overturned the order of the justices and directed that the pamphlets be returned to Scott, subject to the opinion of the Court of the Queen's Bench. On 29 April the Court decided, "We have considered this matter, and we are of opinion that the judgment of the learned recorder must be reversed, and the decision of the magistrates affirmed."

== Hicklin test ==
The Hicklin test is a legal test for obscenity established by the English case Regina v. Hicklin. At issue was the statutory interpretation of the word "obscene" in the Obscene Publications Act 1857, which authorized the destruction of obscene books. The court held that all material tending "to deprave and corrupt those whose minds are open to such immoral influences" was obscene, regardless of its artistic or literary merit.

American courts adopted the Hicklin Test in applying the 1873 Comstock Act, but it later did not survive scrutiny in the US under the First Amendment.

== Politics ==
Hicklin served as Mayor of Wolverhampton 1859/60

== Family ==
Hicklin was born in Wolverhampton on 11 November 1816, the son of wharfinger Benjamin Hickin and Elizabeth née Barney. Hicklin became articled for five years to attorney at law, Joseph Foster of Wolverhampton, on 26 May 1832. In 1844 he was living at Graiseley House, and owned a part share of houses and land with his elder brother, James.

Hicklin married Mary Hatfield of Rugeley, Staffordshire on 22 August 1848. They lived at Wightwick, Staffordshire, then The Holmes, Fordhouses, Bushbury, Staffordshire. After Hicklin retired they settled in Worthing, Sussex, England where he died in 1909, aged 92.

Political offices
Preceded by John Hartley	Mayor of Wolverhampton; 1859–1860	Succeeded by Charles Clarke
