= Sportsworld (magazine) =

Indian sports magazine (1978–94)

Sportsworld is a defunct Indian sports magazine that was published by the Ananda Bazar group from 1978 to 1994.

== History and profile ==
Sportsworld was founded in 1978. The first editor of the magazine was Mansoor Ali Khan Pataudi who edited the magazine until 1994 when it was closed. Published in Calcutta, the magazine was one of the major English-language sports magazines in India. The magazine was published weekly. It was sold to the other magazine Sportstar, published by The Hindu Group in Madras. The magazine was the home of young journalists such as Rohit Brijnath, Mudar Patherya and quizmaster Derek O'Brien. The magazine ceased publication in 1994.
