= Community standards =

As a legal term in the United States, community standards arose from a test to determine whether material is or is not obscene as explicated in the 1957 Supreme Court decision in the matter of Roth v. United States. In its 6–3 decision written by William J. Brennan Jr., the court held that material being obscene depended upon "whether to the average person, applying contemporary community standards, the dominant theme of the material taken as a whole appeals to prurient interest." With its emphasis on the reaction of an average person rather than that of an especially susceptible person, the court rejected applying the Hicklin test as a means of determining whether material is obscene, and the ruling represented a liberalization of the nation's obscenity laws.

The concept was further refined in the matter of Miller v. California in which the Court's adoption of the Miller test, also based upon community standards, had the opposite effect. Chief Justice Warren E. Burger, the author of the Court's 5–4 opinion, wrote that it is not "constitutionally sound to read the First Amendment as requiring that the people of Maine or Mississippi accept public depiction of conduct found tolerable in Las Vegas, or New York City," thus opening the way for the Justice Department to prosecute adult entertainment businesses that distribute their products nationally in especially conservative jurisdictions.

Some social media companies operate community standards providing rules or guidance on what it is and what it is not acceptable to post online. On 25 April 2017, the UK House of Commons Home Affairs Committee stated:

We welcome the fact that YouTube, Facebook and Twitter all have clear community standards that go beyond the requirements of the law. We strongly welcome the commitment that all three social media companies have to removing hate speech or graphically violent content, and their acceptance of their social responsibility towards their users and towards wider communities.

Colleges and universities enforce their standards through conduct offices in their Student Affairs divisions.
