= Sexual norm =

Concept of normal sexuality, whether social or personal

A sexual norm can refer to a personal or a social norm. Most cultures have social norms regarding sexuality, and define normal sexuality to consist only of certain sex acts between individuals who meet specific age criteria, nonconsanguinity (vs. incest), race/ethnicity (vs. interracial relationships), and/or social role and socioeconomic status.

In most societies, the term normal identifies a range or spectrum of behaviors. Rather than each act being classified as "acceptable" or "not acceptable", many acts are viewed as "more or less accepted" by different people, and the degree to which they are considered normal or acceptable depends greatly on the individual making the assessment and the culture itself. Based on information gained from sexological studies, a great many ordinary people's sex lives are very often quite different from popular beliefs about normal, in private.

If non-restrictive sexual norms are regarded positively, they may be called "sexual freedom", "sexual liberation" or "free love". If they are regarded negatively, they may be called "sexual licence" or "licentiousness". Restrictive social norms, if judged negatively, are called sexual oppression. If the restrictive norms are judged positively, they may be regarded as encouraging chastity, "sexual self-restraint" or "sexual decency", and negative terms are used for the targeted sexuality, e.g. sexual abuse and perversion.

== Social attitudes ==
In the West, some people have relaxed the traditional definitions of normality, choosing instead to define normal sexuality as any sexual practice which does not involve what are regarded as sexual perversions. However, using this definition makes use of a long list of sexual perversions, which themselves show up hidden assumptions about cultural norms. Recently, in Western society, consensual paraphilias are becoming more acceptable, in particular "any activity, not otherwise illegal, performed between consenting adults in private".

This liberalization of attitudes has resulted in the decriminalisation of homosexuality in many countries, following the ground-breaking Wolfenden report in the United Kingdom.

There is a tendency in Western countries towards serial monogamy as a normal heterosexual lifestyle. There is also a movement towards recognizing long-term homosexual relationships (see same-sex marriage).

There is also greater acceptance of sexual relationships (partnerships) without requiring the sanction of a form of marriage recognised by the church, state or legal system.

These liberalizing trends can be contrasted with conservative social trends that seek to reverse these patterns of behaviour, with encouragement for young people to choose traditionally accepted roles, beliefs and behaviors, and to exercise sexual abstinence or non-promiscuous lifestyles before marriage.

There is an opposing trend in reaction, that views such changes as a socially destructive force, and is opposed to them. It is often, though not exclusively, associated with people who have religious beliefs, and is prevalent in much of Christianity in America, as well as Islam in the Middle East and Asia, and other devout religious groups such as Haredi Jews in Israel. In such countries there is often strong criticism of non-traditional sexualities and sexual liberation.

Some social unrest in both Eastern and Western cultures is due to this conflict between these two trends, and views upon acceptability and control of social and sexual norms.

== See also ==
- Catholic teachings on sexual morality
- Gender role
- Religion and sexuality
- Reproductive rights
- Same-sex marriage
- Sex and the law
- Sex-positive feminism
- Sex-positive movement
- Sexual script theory
