= List of United States Supreme Court cases, volume 413 =

This is a list of all the United States Supreme Court cases from volume 413 of the United States Reports:

Case name	Citation	Date decided
Gilligan v. Morgan	413 U.S. 1	1973
Miller v. California	413 U.S. 15	1973
Paris Adult Theatre I v. Slaton	413 U.S. 49	1973
Kaplan v. California	413 U.S. 115	1973
United States v. 12 200-ft. Reels of Film	413 U.S. 123	1973
United States v. Orito	413 U.S. 139	1973
Keyes v. School District No. 1, Denver	413 U.S. 189	1973
Almeida-Sanchez v. United States	413 U.S. 266	1973
United States v. Ash	413 U.S. 300	1973
NAACP v. New York	413 U.S. 345	1973
Pittsburgh Press Co. v. Pittsburgh Commission on Human Relations	413 U.S. 376	1973
New York State Department of Social Services v. Dublino	413 U.S. 405	1973
Cady v. Dombrowski	413 U.S. 433	1973
Levitt v. Comm. for Pub. Educ. & Religious Liberty	413 U.S. 472	1973
Heller v. New York	413 U.S. 483	1973
Roaden v. Kentucky	413 U.S. 496	1973
Department of Agriculture v. Murry	413 U.S. 508	1973
Department of Agriculture v. Moreno	413 U.S. 528	1973
United States Civil Service Commission v. National Association of Letter Carriers	413 U.S. 548	1973
Broadrick v. Oklahoma	413 U.S. 601	1973
Sugarman v. Dougall	413 U.S. 634	1973
Gosa v. Mayden	413 U.S. 665	1973
In re Griffiths	413 U.S. 717	1973
Hunt v. McNair	413 U.S. 734	1973
Committee for Public Education v. Nyquist	413 U.S. 756	1973
Sloan v. Lemon	413 U.S. 825	1973
Alexander v. Virginia	413 U.S. 836	1973
Fausner v. Comm'r	413 U.S. 838	1973
