= Roth v. United States =

1957 U.S. Supreme Court case

- Supreme Court of the United States

Argued April 22, 1957 Decided June 24, 1957
- Full case name: Samuel Roth v. United States; David S. Alberts v. California
- Citations: 354 U.S. 476 (more) 77 S. Ct. 1304; 1 L. Ed. 2d 1498; 1957 U.S. LEXIS 587; 14 Ohio Op. 2d 331; 1 Media L. Rep. 1375

Case history
- Prior: United States v. Roth, 237 F.2d 796 (2d Cir. 1957); cert. granted, 352 U.S. 964 (1957); People v. Alberts, 138 Cal.App.2d Supp. 909, 292 P.2d 90 (1955); probable jurisdiction noted, 352 U.S. 962 (1957).

Holding
- Obscenity is not protected by the First Amendment; more strictly defined "obscene."

Court membership
- Chief Justice Earl Warren Associate Justices Hugo Black · Felix Frankfurter; William O. Douglas · Harold H. Burton; Tom C. Clark · John M. Harlan II; William J. Brennan Jr. · Charles E. Whittaker

Case opinions
- Majority: Brennan, joined by Frankfurter, Burton, Clark, Whittaker
- Concurrence: Warren (in the judgment of the court only)
- Dissent: Harlan
- Dissent: Douglas, joined by Black
- Overruled by
- Miller v. California, 413 U.S. 15 (1973)

Roth v. United States, 354 U.S. 476 (1957), along with its companion case Alberts v. California, was a landmark decision of the Supreme Court of the United States which redefined the constitutional test for determining what constitutes obscene material unprotected by the First Amendment. The Court, in an opinion by Justice William J. Brennan Jr. created a test to determine what constituted obscene material: Whether the average person, applying contemporary community standards, would find that the material appeals to a prurient interest in sex, and whether the material was utterly without redeeming social value. Although the Court upheld Roth’s conviction and allowed some obscenity prosecutions, it drastically loosened obscenity laws. The decision dissatisfied both social conservatives who thought that it had gone too far in tolerating sexual imagery, and liberals who felt that it infringed on the rights of consenting adults.

The decision was modified by Miller v. California (1973), which removed the "utterly without redeeming social value" test, and replaced it with a three-part test. In that case, Justice Brennan dissented, repudiating his previous position in Roth, arguing that states could not ban the sale, advertisement, or distribution of obscene materials to consenting adults.

== Prior history ==
Under the common law rule that prevailed before Roth, articulated most famously in the 1868 English case Regina v Hicklin, any material that tended to "deprave and corrupt those whose minds are open to such immoral influences" was deemed "obscene" and could be banned on that basis. Thus, works by Balzac, Flaubert, James Joyce and D. H. Lawrence were banned based on isolated passages and the effect they might have on children.

Samuel Roth, who ran an adult book-selling business in New York City, was convicted under a federal statute criminalizing the sending of "obscene, lewd, lascivious or filthy" materials through the mail for advertising and selling a publication called American Aphrodite ("A Quarterly for the Fancy-Free") containing literary erotica and nude photography. David Alberts, who ran a mail-order business from Los Angeles, was convicted under a California statute for selling lewd and obscene books. The Court granted certiorari and affirmed both convictions.

== Ruling ==
Roth came down as a 6–3 decision, with the opinion of the Court authored by William J. Brennan Jr. The Court repudiated the Hicklin test and defined obscenity more strictly, as material whose "dominant theme taken as a whole appeals to the prurient interest" of the "average person, applying contemporary community standards." Only material meeting this test could be banned as "obscene." However, Brennan reaffirmed that obscenity was not protected by the First Amendment and thus upheld the convictions of Roth and Alberts for publishing and sending obscene material through the mail.

Congress could ban material, "utterly without redeeming social importance," or in other words, "whether to the average person, applying contemporary community standards, the dominant theme of the material taken as a whole appeals to the prurient interest."

Chief Justice Earl Warren worried that "broad language used here may eventually be applied to the arts and sciences and freedom of communication generally," but, agreeing that obscenity is not constitutionally protected, concurred only in the judgment.

Justices Hugo Black and William O. Douglas, First Amendment "literalists," dissented in Roth, arguing vigorously that the First Amendment protected obscene material.

Justice John Marshall Harlan II dissented in Roth, involving a federal statute, but concurred in Alberts, involving a state law, on the grounds that while states had broad power to prosecute obscenity, the federal government did not.

== Legacy ==
In Memoirs v. Massachusetts (1966), a plurality of the Court further redefined the Roth test by holding unprotected only that which is "patently offensive" and "utterly without redeeming social value," but no opinion in that case could command a majority of the Court either, and the state of the law in the obscenity field remained confused.

Pornography and sexually oriented publications proliferated as a result of the Warren Court's holdings, the "Sexual Revolution" of the 1960s flowered, and pressure increasingly came on the Court to allow leeway for state and local governments to crack down on obscenity. During his ill-fated bid to become Chief Justice, Justice Abe Fortas was attacked vigorously in Congress by conservatives such as Strom Thurmond for siding with the Warren Court majority in liberalizing protection for pornography. In his 1968 presidential campaign, Richard Nixon campaigned against the Warren Court, pledging to appoint "strict constructionists" to the Supreme Court.

In Miller v. California (1973), a five-person majority agreed for the first time since Roth on a test for determining constitutionally unprotected obscenity, thereby replacing the Roth test. By the time Miller was considered in 1973, Justice Brennan had abandoned the Roth test and argued that "no formulation of this Court, the Congress, or the States can adequately distinguish obscene material unprotected by the First Amendment from protected expression."

== See also ==
- List of United States Supreme Court cases, volume 354
- Freedom of speech
- United States Bill of Rights
- United States Constitution
- One, Inc. v. Olesen, 355 U.S. 371 (1958), an application of the Roth standard.
- Censorship
