= Miller v. California =

1973 U.S. Supreme Court case on obscenity

- Supreme Court of the United States

Argued January 18–19, 1972 Reargued November 7, 1972 Decided June 21, 1973
- Full case name: Marvin Miller v. State of California
- Citations: 413 U.S. 15 (more) 93 S. Ct. 2607; 37 L. Ed. 2d 419; 1973 U.S. LEXIS 149; 1 Media L. Rep. 144.1

Case history
- Prior: Summary affirmation of jury verdict by Appellate Department, Superior Court of California, County of Orange, was unpublished.

Holding
- Obscene materials are defined as those that the average person, applying contemporary community standards, find, taken as a whole, appeal to the prurient interest; that depict or describe, in a patently offensive way, sexual conduct or excretory functions specifically defined by applicable state law; and that the work, taken as a whole, lacks serious literary, artistic, political, or scientific value.

Court membership
- Chief Justice Warren E. Burger Associate Justices William O. Douglas · William J. Brennan Jr. Potter Stewart · Byron White; Thurgood Marshall · Harry Blackmun; Lewis F. Powell Jr. · William Rehnquist

Case opinions
- Majority: Burger, joined by White, Blackmun, Powell, Rehnquist
- Dissent: Douglas
- Dissent: Brennan, joined by Stewart, Marshall

Laws applied
- U.S. Const. amend. I; Cal. Penal Code 311.2(a)

Miller v. California, 413 U.S. 15 (1973), is a landmark decision of the U.S. Supreme Court clarifying the legal definition of obscenity. The ruling was the origin of the three-part judicial test for determining obscene media content that can be banned by government authorities, which is now known as the Miller test.

== Background ==
In 1971, Marvin Miller, owner of a California mail-order business specializing in pornographic films and books, mass-mailed a brochure advertising products that graphically depicted sexual activity between men and women. Five of the brochures were mailed to a restaurant in Newport Beach, California. The owner and his mother opened the envelope and, upon seeing the brochures, called the police.

Miller was arrested and charged with violating California Penal Code 311.2(a) which says in part: "Every person who knowingly sends or causes to be sent, or brings or causes to be brought, into this state for sale or distribution, [...] any obscene matter is for a first offense, guilty of a misdemeanor." California lawmakers wrote the statute based on two previous Supreme Court obscenity rulings: Memoirs v. Massachusetts and Roth v. United States.

Miller was tried by jury at the Superior Court of Orange County. The judge instructed the jury to evaluate the evidence by the community standards of California as defined by the statute. The jury returned a guilty verdict.

Miller appealed to the Appellate Division of the Superior Court, arguing that the jury instructions did not use the standard set in Memoirs v. Massachusetts which said that in order to be judged obscene, materials must be "utterly without redeeming social value." The appellate division rejected this argument and upheld the jury verdict. Miller then filed an appeal with the California Court of Appeal for the Third District, which declined to review the lower court rulings.

Adopting a freedom of speech argument, Miller applied to the U.S. Supreme Court for certiorari, which was granted. The first oral arguments were heard in January 1972.

== Supreme Court precedents on obscenity ==
The U.S. Supreme Court granted certiorari to Miller because the California statute at issue was based on two previous obscenity precedents that the Court wanted to revisit. Chief Justice Warren Burger believed that the Court's obscenity jurisprudence was misguided and that governments should be given more leeway to ban obscene materials. Burger pushed for a looser definition of "obscenity" which would allow local prosecutions. Meanwhile, Justice William J. Brennan, Jr., pushed for First Amendment protection for all "obscenity" unless distributed to minors or exposed offensively to unconsenting adults. These disagreements among the Justices resulted in three different hearings, pushing Miller's case into 1973.

Since the Roth v. United States ruling in 1957, the Supreme Court had struggled to define what embodied constitutionally unprotected obscene material. Under the Comstock laws controlling mail distribution that prevailed before Roth, any material that tended to "deprave and corrupt those whose minds are open to such immoral influences" was deemed "obscene" and could be banned on that basis. Roth defined obscenity more strictly, as material whose "dominant theme taken as a whole appeals to the prurient interest" to the "average person, applying contemporary community standards". Only material meeting this test could now be banned as "obscene".

In Jacobellis v. Ohio in 1964, concerning a state ban of an adult-oriented film, Justice Potter Stewart opined that the Court "was faced with the task of trying to define what may be indefinable", and that criminal laws were constitutionally limited to hardcore pornography, which he did not try to define: "perhaps I could never succeed in intelligibly doing so. But I know it when I see it". In Memoirs v. Massachusetts in 1966, the Supreme Court refined the Roth test to material that is "patently offensive" and "utterly without redeeming social value". These precedents resulted in an unclear definition of obscene material that could be banned by government authorities.

In Redrup v. New York in 1967, the Supreme Court decided that written materials that were not sold to minors or foisted on unwilling audiences were constitutionally protected. Afterward, the Supreme Court systematically and summarily reversed, without further opinion, scores of obscenity rulings involving paperback sex books.

== Opinion of the Court ==
Miller had based his appeal in California on the Memoirs v. Massachusetts precedent, particularly its test for material without any redeeming social value. Miller believed that such material had value for consenting adults who purchased it voluntarily. Per this argument positioning such material as items of expression, the question before the Court was whether the sale and distribution of that material was protected under the First Amendment's guarantee of freedom of speech. The Court determined that the material at issue in Miller's case was pornography that could have been banned under the Roth precedent.

However, the Court acknowledged "the inherent dangers of undertaking to regulate any form of expression", and said that "State statutes designed to regulate obscene materials must be carefully limited." The Court, in an attempt to set such limits, devised a set of three criteria which must be met for a media item to be legitimately subjected to state regulatory bans:

1. whether the average person, applying contemporary community standards, would find that the work, taken as a whole, appeals to the prurient interest;
2. whether the work depicts or describes, in a patently offensive way, sexual conduct or excretory functions, as specifically defined by applicable state law; and
3. whether the work, taken as a whole, lacks serious literary, artistic, political, or scientific value.

This test clarified the definition of obscenity originally set out in the Memoirs precedent. This three-part analysis became known as the Miller test.

The result of the ruling was that the Supreme Court overturned Miller's criminal conviction and remanded the case back to the California Superior Court for reconsideration of whether Miller had committed a misdemeanor. On overturning Miller's conviction, the Court stated: "Under the holdings announced today, no one will be subject to prosecution for the sale or exposure of obscene materials unless these materials depict or describe patently offensive 'hard core' sexual conduct specifically defined by the regulating state law, as written or construed."

=== Dissents ===
Four justices dissented in Miller v. California and rejected the Court's revised obscenity standard. Justice Douglas, in his dissent, argued that obscenity is not mentioned in the Constitution and that the First Amendment provides no exception for it, asserting that obscenity cases "have no business in the courts" and that the new three-pronged test was vague and created a criminal law "trap" for publishers. Justice Brennan's dissent, joined by Justices Stewart and Marshall, referred to his reasoning in the companion case Paris Adult Theatre I v. Slaton decided the same day, where he maintained that obscenity laws could not be drafted consistently with the First Amendment due to the difficulty of creating an objective definition, making state-ordered regulation inherently problematic.

== Impact and subsequent events ==
The Miller ruling, and particularly the resulting Miller test, was the Supreme Court's first comprehensive explication of obscene material that does not qualify for First Amendment protection and thus can be banned by governmental authorities with criminal charges for those who distribute it. Furthermore, due to the three-part test's stringent requirements, very few types of content can now be completely banned, and material that is appropriate for consenting adults can only be partially restricted per delivery method.

Miller failed to directly address government restrictions on public exhibitions of adult entertainment; this issue was handled in a companion case, Paris Adult Theatre I v. Slaton, which was decided by the Supreme Court on the same day.

Categories of media material that completely fail the Miller test, and thus can be completely banned by government authorities, have been narrowed down in later Supreme Court rulings. Child pornography was deemed to be unprotected by the First Amendment in New York v. Ferber in 1982, because it has no redeeming social value per the Miller test. In Ashcroft v. Free Speech Coalition in 2002, however, the Court held that sexually explicit material that only appears to depict minors, but actually does not, might also be considered obscenity with no redeeming social value.

The "community standards" portion of the Miller test is of particular relevance with the rise of the Internet, as materials believed by some to be "obscene" can be accessed from anywhere in the nation, including places where there is a greater concern than other areas of the nation. Enforcing and applying obscenity laws to the Internet have proven difficult. Due to the difficulty in determining which "community" is most relevant, both the Child Pornography Prevention Act (CPPA) and the Child Online Protection Act (COPA) have had sections struck down as unconstitutional in cases such as Ashcroft v. Free Speech Coalition and Ashcroft v. ACLU.

== See also ==
- List of United States Supreme Court cases, volume 413
- Sex-related court cases
- United States obscenity law
