= Obscenity =

Act or statement that offends the morality of the period

An obscenity is any utterance or act that strongly offends the prevalent morality of the time. It is derived from the Latin obscēnus, obscaenus, "boding ill; disgusting; indecent", of uncertain etymology. Generally, the term can be used to indicate strong moral repugnance and outrage in expressions such as "obscene profits" and "the obscenity of war". As a legal term, it usually refers to descriptions and depictions of people engaged in sexual and excretory activity.

== United States obscenity law ==
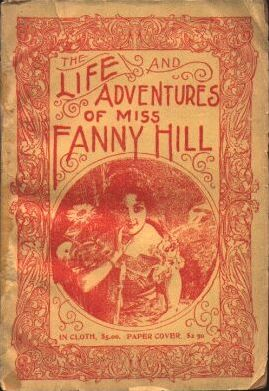
Cover of an undated American edition of Fanny Hill, c. 1910

In the United States, issues of obscenity raise issues of limitations on the freedom of speech and of the press, which are otherwise protected by the First Amendment to the U.S. Constitution.

Federal obscenity law in the U.S. is unusual in that there is no uniform national standard. Former Justice Potter Stewart of the Supreme Court of the United States, in attempting to classify what material constituted exactly "what is obscene", famously wrote, "I shall not today attempt further to define the kinds of material I understand to be embraced ... [b]ut I know it when I see it...." In the U.S., the 1973 ruling of the U.S. Supreme Court in Miller v. California established a three-tiered test to determine what was obscene—and thus not protected, versus what was merely erotic and thus protected by the First Amendment. Delivering the opinion of the court, Chief Justice Warren Burger wrote:

The basic guidelines for the trier of fact must be: (a) whether the average person, applying contemporary community standards, would find that the work, taken as a whole, appeals to the prurient interest, (b) whether the work depicts or describes, in a patently offensive way, sexual conduct specifically defined by the applicable state law; and (c) whether the work, taken as a whole, lacks serious literary, artistic, political, or scientific value.

=== Non image-based obscenity cases in the U.S. ===
While most recent (2016) obscenity cases in the U.S. have revolved around images and films, the first obscenity cases dealt with textual works.

The classification of "obscene" and thus illegal for production and distribution has been judged on printed text-only stories starting with Dunlop v. U.S., 165 U.S. 486 (1897), which upheld a conviction for mailing and delivery of a newspaper called the Chicago Dispatch, containing "obscene, lewd, lascivious, and indecent materials", which was later upheld in several cases. One of these was "A Book Named John Cleland's Memoirs of a Woman of Pleasure" v. Attorney General of Com. of Massachusetts, "383 U.S. 413 (1966)" wherein the book Fanny Hill, written by John Cleland c. 1760, was judged to be obscene in a proceeding that put the book itself on trial rather than its publisher. Another was Kaplan v. California, 413 U.S. 115 (1973) whereby the court most famously determined that "Obscene material in book form is not entitled to any First Amendment protection merely because it has no pictorial content."

Literature (non-fiction) communicating contraceptive information was prohibited by several states. The last such prohibition, in Connecticut, was overturned judicially in 1965.

In 2005, the U.S. Department of Justice formed the Obscenity Prosecution Task Force in a push to prosecute obscenity cases. Red Rose Stories, a site dedicated to text-only fantasy stories, became one of many sites targeted by the FBI for shutdown. The government alleged that Red Rose Stories contained depictions of child rape. The publisher pleaded guilty.

Many U.S. states have had bans on the sale of sex toys, regulating them as obscene devices. Some states have seen their sex toy bans ruled unconstitutional in the courts. That ruling leaves only Mississippi, Alabama, and Virginia with current bans on the sale of obscene devices.

=== Key U.S. court cases on obscenity ===
- In 1957, two associates of acclaimed poet Allen Ginsberg were arrested and jailed for selling his book "Howl and Other Poems" to undercover police officers at a beatnik bookstore in San Francisco. Eventually the California Supreme Court declared the literature to be of "redeeming social value" and therefore not classifiable as "obscene". Because the poem "Howl" contains pornographic slang and overt references to drugs and homosexuality, the poem was (and is) frequently censored and confiscated; however, it remains a landmark case.
- FCC v. Pacifica Foundation (1978), better known as the landmark "seven dirty words" case. In that ruling, the Court found that only "repetitive and frequent" use of the words in a time or place when a minor could hear, can be punished.
- In State v. Henry (1987), the Oregon Supreme Court ruled that the Oregon state law that criminalized obscenity was an unconstitutional restriction of free speech under the free speech provision of the Oregon Constitution, with the ruling making Oregon the "first state in the nation to abolish the offense of obscenity".
- In Cohen v. California, 403 U.S. 15 (1971), the U.S. Supreme Court ruled that the word "fuck", although almost universally considered obscene when used to describe sexual intercourse, is speech-protected by the First Amendment to the United States Constitution when used to express a political belief. On 26 April 1968, Paul Robert Cohen, then 19 years old, wore a jacket bearing the words "Fuck the Draft" while visiting the Los Angeles Courthouse to testify as a defense witness in a court hearing. Although Cohen removed the jacket before entering the courtroom, he had been observed wearing it in the courthouse corridor by a court officer. When Cohen left the courtroom, the officer arrested him for disturbing the peace. Cohen defended his attire as being an expression of disapproval of the war in Vietnam. Nonetheless, he was convicted of "maliciously and willfully disturbing the peace" and sentenced to 30 days in jail. The conviction was eventually upheld by the Supreme Court of California but reversed by the Supreme Court of the United States. In a 5–4 decision, Justice Harlan wrote for the Court that Cohen's conviction was based solely on speech and was protected by the First Amendment. In a dissenting opinion, Justice Blackmun countered that Cohen's wearing of the jacket in the courthouse was not speech but conduct amounting to an "absurd and immature antic".
- In Miller v. California (1973) – the currently-binding Supreme Court precedent on the issue –, the Court ruled materials were obscene if they appealed "to a prurient interest", showed "patently offensive sexual conduct" that was specifically defined by a state obscenity law, and "lacked serious artistic, literary, political, or scientific value." Decisions regarding whether material was obscene should be based on local, not national, standards.
  Standards superseded by the Miller Test include:
  - Wepplo (1947): If material has a substantial tendency to deprave or corrupt its readers by inciting lascivious thoughts or arousing lustful desires. (People v. Wepplo, 78 Cal. App.2d Supp. 959, 178 P.2d 853).
  - Hicklin test (1868): the effect of isolated passages upon the most susceptible persons. (British common law, cited in Regina v. Hicklin, 1868. LR 3 QB 360 – overturned when Michigan tried to outlaw all printed matter that would 'corrupt the morals of youth' in Butler v. State of Michigan 352 U.S. 380 (1957))
  - Roth Standard (1957): "Whether to the average person applying contemporary community standards, the dominant theme of the material, taken as a whole, appeals to the prurient interest". Roth v. United States 354 U.S. 476 (1957) – overturned by Miller
  - Roth-Jacobellis (1964): "community standards" applicable to an obscenity are national, not local standards. Material is "utterly without redeeming social importance". Jacobellis v. Ohio 378 (1964) – a famous quote from this case saying: "I shall not today attempt further to define [hardcore pornography] ... But I know it when I see it."
- Roth-Jacobellis-Memoirs Test (1966): Adds that the material possesses "not a modicum of social value". (A Book Named John Cleland's Memoirs of a Woman of Pleasure v. Attorney General of Massachusetts, 383 U.S. 413 (1966))
- In Reno v. ACLU (1997), the US Supreme Court struck down the anti-indecency provisions of the 1996 Communications Decency Act.

FCC rules and federal law govern obscenity in broadcast media. Many historically important works have been described as obscene or prosecuted under obscenity laws, including the works of Charles Baudelaire, Lenny Bruce, William S. Burroughs, Allen Ginsberg, James Joyce, D. H. Lawrence, Henry Miller, Samuel Beckett, and the Marquis de Sade.

=== Criticism ===
Obscenity law has been criticized in the following areas:

- Federal law forbids obscenity in certain contexts (such as broadcast); however, the law does not define the term.
- The U.S. Supreme Court similarly has had difficulty defining the term. In Miller v. California, the court defers definition to two hypothetical entities, "contemporary community standards" and "hypothetical reasonable persons".
- The courts and the legislature have had similar problems defining this term because it is paradoxical, and thus impossible to define.
- Because the term "obscenity" is not defined by either the statutes or the case law, this law does not satisfy the vagueness doctrine, which states that people must clearly be informed as to the prohibited behavior.
- Because the determination of what is obscene (offensive) is ultimately a personal preference, alleged violations of obscenity law are not actionable (actions require a right).
- Because no actual injury occurs when a mere preference is violated, alleged violations of obscenity law are not actionable (actions require an injury).

Obscenity laws remain enforceable under Miller despite these criticisms. Some states have passed laws mandating censorship in schools, universities, and libraries even if they are not receiving government aid that would require censorship in these institutions. These include Arizona, Kentucky, Michigan, Minnesota, South Carolina, and Tennessee. Twenty more states were considering such legislation in 2001–2002.

=== Child pornography ===
Child pornography refers to images or films (also known as child abuse images); as such, visual child pornography is a record of child sexual abuse. Abuse of the child occurs during the sexual acts that are recorded in the production of child pornography, and several professors of psychology state that memories of the abuse are maintained as long as visual records exist, are accessed, and are "exploited perversely". Some countries also bans writings—that depict sexually explicit activities involving a child.

In New York v. Ferber, 458 U.S. 747 (1982), the U.S. Supreme Court ruled that child pornography need not be legally obscene in order to be outlawed. The Court ruled that in contrast to the types of images considered in Miller, images that depicted underlying harm to children need not appeal to "the prurient interest of the average person", portray sexual conduct in "a patently offensive manner", nor be considered holistically, in order to be proscribed. Another difference between U.S. constitutional law concerning obscenity and that governing child pornography is that the Supreme Court ruled in Stanley v. Georgia, 394 U.S. 557 (1969), that possession of obscene material could not be criminalized, while in Osborne v. Ohio, 495 U.S. 103 (1990), the high court ruled that possession of child pornography could be criminalized. The reason was that the motive for criminalizing child pornography possession was "to destroy a market for the exploitative use of children" rather than to prevent the material from poisoning the minds of its viewers. The three dissenting justices in that case argued, "While the sexual exploitation of children is undoubtedly a serious problem, Ohio may employ other weapons to combat it."

=== Censorship in film ===
This is most notably shown with the "X" rating under which some films are categorized. The most notable films given an "X" rating were Deep Throat (1972) and The Devil in Miss Jones (1973). These films show explicit, non-simulated, penetrative sex that was presented as part of a reasonable plot with respectable production values. Some state authorities issued injunctions against such films to protect "local community standards"; in New York, the print of Deep Throat was seized mid-run, and the film's exhibitors were found guilty of promoting obscenity. According to the documentary This Film Is Not Yet Rated, films that include gay sex (even if implied) or female pleasure have been more harshly censored than their heterosexual, male counterparts. The Motion Picture Association of America (MPAA) issues ratings for motion pictures exhibited and distributed commercially to the public in the United States; the ratings are issued through the Classification and Rating Administration (CARA). The intent of the rating system is to provide information about the content of motion pictures so parents can determine whether an individual motion picture is suitable for viewing by their children.

== United Kingdom ==
Obscenity law in England and Wales is currently governed by the Obscene Publications Act, but obscenity law dates back much further into English common law. The conviction in 1727 of Edmund Curll for the publication of Venus in the Cloister or the Nun in her Smock under the common-law offence of disturbing the peace appears to be the first conviction for obscenity in the United Kingdom, and set a legal precedent for other convictions. These common-law ideas of obscenity formed the original basis of obscenity law in other common law countries, such as the United States. The classic definition of criminal obscenity is if it "tends to deprave and corrupt", stated in 1868 by Lord Justice Cockburn, in Regina v. Hicklin, now known as the Hicklin test.

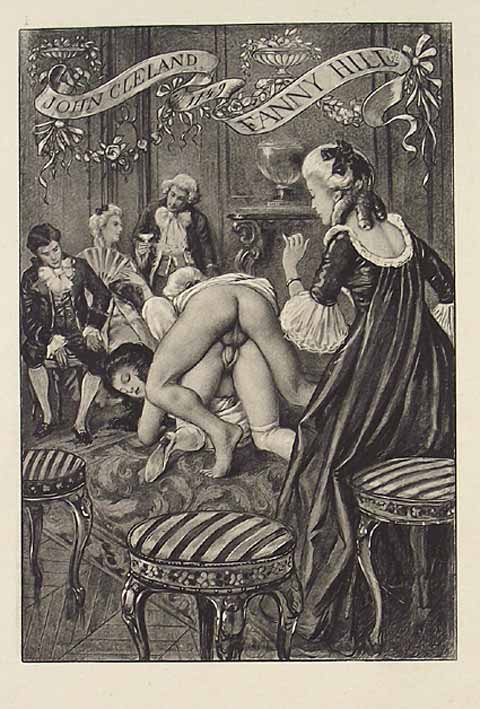
The 18th century book Fanny Hill (1748) has been subject to obscenity trials at various times.

Stanley Kauffmann's novel The Philanderer was published by Penguin Books in 1957 and was unsuccessfully prosecuted for obscenity.

The Obscene Publications Act is famously vague, defining obscenity with reference to material that is likely to "deprave and corrupt". The 1959 act was passed at the point when most Western countries were about to enter a new phase of sexual freedom. The trial of Penguin Books over their publication of Lady Chatterley's Lover in 1960 failed to secure a conviction and the conviction in the 1971 trial of Oz magazine was overturned on appeal. An attempt to prosecute the University of Central England in 1997 over a copy of a library book by Robert Mapplethorpe was abandoned amidst derision from academics and the media.

For visual works of art the main obscenity law in England and Wales was, until the 1960s, the Vagrancy Act 1838 which was successfully used in prosecutions against D.H. Lawrence for an exhibition of his paintings at the Warren Gallery, London, in 1929, and in 1966 against the British artist Stass Paraskos for an exhibition of his paintings held that year in the northern English city of Leeds. Parts of the Act were repealed shortly after the Paraskos trial and it has rarely been used since in relation to visual art.

Sex crime has generated particular concern. In 1976 the BBFC said that, in that year, it had viewed 58 films depicting "explicit rape", declaring scenes that glorified it as "obscene". As opposed to questions of "indecency", which have been applied to sexual explicitness, films charged with being obscene have been viewed as having "a tendency to deprave and corrupt" and been liable to prosecution. In 2008, the UK prosecuted a man for writing a fictional sex story (R v Walker). In 2009, the crown prosecution service (CPS) dropped the case.

During the 1960s and 1970s most Western countries legalised hardcore pornography. By the 1980s the UK was almost the only liberal democracy where the sale of hardcore pornography was still completely illegal, although ownership was not a criminal offence (except child pornography). Home videotape was a booming market and it was relatively simple for individuals to smuggle hardcore material in from Europe or the United States, where it could be purchased legally, either for personal use or to copy it for distribution. This resulted in a considerable black market of poor quality videotapes. Meanwhile, people attempting to buy pornography legally would often be sold heavily censored R18 certificate material.

While the authorities tried to prevent the illegal sale of pornography they found that juries, while not particularly liking the material, were reluctant to convict defendants where the material was intended for private use among consenting adults. During the 1990s the advent of the internet made it easier than ever before for British citizens to access hardcore material. Finally, in 2000, following the dismissal of a test case brought by the BBFC, hardcore pornography was effectively legalised, subject to certain conditions and licensing restrictions. It is still an offence to sell obscene material by mail order.

After 1984, videotape sellers were more likely to be prosecuted under the Video Recordings Act rather than the OPA. The VRA requires that all videos must have a certificate from the BBFC. If the BBFC refuses a certificate, a video is effectively banned for home viewing, but not necessarily in the cinema. Four films that were originally refused a certificate—The Exorcist, Straw Dogs, The Evil Dead, and The Texas Chainsaw Massacre—were granted a certificate in the late 1990s and have subsequently been screened on mainstream television.

== New Zealand ==
According to the Films, Videos, and Publications Classification Act 1993, "publication may be age-restricted if it contains highly offensive language likely to cause serious harm".

In New Zealand, screening of Deep Throat (1972) was only cleared in 1986. However, the film has not been screened because the only cinema that has tried to organize a screening was thwarted by the city council that owned the building's lease.

== China ==
Section 9 of the Criminal Law provides provisions against pornography, including creation, distribution and organizing public viewing.

In 2016, the Ministry of Culture in China censored 23 companies for hosting obscene content online. The take-down included over 20,000 live feeds from 26 different websites that were hosting a variety of content involving pornography and violence.

== Hong Kong SAR ==
The Control of Obscene and Indecent Articles Ordinance (Cap 390) imposes controls on the publication and display of obscene and indecent articles.

== Canada ==
Section 163 of the Canadian Criminal Code provides the country's legal definition of "obscenity". Officially termed as "Offences Tending to Corrupt Morals", the Canadian prohibited class of articles that are to be legally included as "obscene things" is very broad, including text-only written material, pictures, models (including statues) records or "any other obscene thing". According to Section 163(8), if "a dominant characteristic of the publication is the undue exploitation of sex, or the combination of sex and at least one of crime, horror, cruelty or violence", that publication is deemed to be "obscene" under the current law.

The current law states:

163. (1) Every person commits an offence who makes, prints, publishes, distributes, circulates or has in their possession for the purpose of publication, distribution or circulation any obscene written matter, picture, model, phonograph record or any other obscene thing.

The Canada Border Services Agency seizes items it labels obscene.

In 1993, Canadian police arrested the 19-year-old writer of a fictional sex story "The Forestwood Kids"; however, the case was dismissed in 1995.

In February 2009, citing its Policy On The Classification Of Obscene Material, the CBSA banned two Lucas Entertainment films because they show the "ingestion of someone else's urine... with a sexual purpose".

In 2016 Mark Marek, owner of bestgore.com, pleaded guilty to breaching obscenity legislation for posting the video of the murder of Jun Lin. He received a six-month non-custodial sentence in a plea agreement, and left court after sentencing with his mouth covered in duct tape to protest his prosecution.

== Brazil ==
Ever since 1940, in the Title VI of the Penal Code, naming crimes against sexual dignity (until 2009 crimes against social conventions), the fourth chapter is dedicated to a crime named "public outrage related to modesty" (Portuguese: ultraje público ao pudor).

It is composed of two articles, Art. 233 "Obscene Act", "to practice an obscene act in a public place, or open or exposed to the public", punished with arrest of 3 months to 1 year or a fine; and Art. 234 "Obscene Written Piece or Object", to do, import, export, purchase or have in one's property, to ends of trade, distribution or public display, any written, drew, painted, stamped or object piece of obscenity, punished with arrest of 6 months to 1 year or a fine.

Criticism to the legislation have included:

- They do not attack anyone's sexual dignity, instead causing outrage at best, but generally just slight discomfort or embarrassment, that can be easily avoided through not looking to such a scene.
- The Art. 234 is aside obsolete, unconstitutional, for the 1988 post-military dictatorship Constitution having in its Fifth Chapter: "[the people] are free to the expression of intellectual, artistic, scientific and communicative activity, independently of censorship and license", reason to which, instead of making it suffer penal restriction, gives any distribution of media the right to be fully exerted.
- The flourishing internet culture of Brazil, where such media is freely shared, as well as its pornographic industry and shops catered to the interests of enhancing apparatus to masturbatory and sexual activity.

It is often used against people who expose their nude bodies in public environments that were not warranted a license to cater to the demographic interested in such practice (the first such place was the Praia do Abricó in Rio de Janeiro, in 1994), even if no sexual action took place, and it may include, for example, a double standard for the chest area of women and men in which only women are penalized. Such a thing took place in the 2012 FEMEN protests in São Paulo.

== India ==
In India the Obscenity law is governed by several laws ranging from Bhartiya Nyaya Sanhita, IT Act 2000, POSCO, Indecent Representation of Women (Prohibition) Act, etc. These are discussed below-

=== Legal Provisions Applicable against the obscene acts in India ===
==== Bhartiya Nyaya Sanhita (BNS), 2023 ====
===== Section 294: Sale, etc., of Obscene Books and Materials =====
This provision penalizes obscene acts performed in a public place if they cause annoyance to others. Additionally, it prohibits singing, reciting, or uttering obscene words, songs, or gestures in public spaces.

- Punishment: Imprisonment of up to three months, a fine, or both.

===== Section 295: Distribution of Obscene Material to Minors =====
This section criminalizes the sale, distribution, or circulation of obscene objects to minors.

- Punishable Actions: Selling, renting, distributing, or exhibiting obscene objects to a child.
- Punishment:
  - First Conviction: Imprisonment of up to three years and a fine of up to ₹2,000.
  - Subsequent Convictions: Imprisonment of up to seven years and a fine of up to ₹5,000.

===== Section 296: Obscene Acts and Expressions in Public Places =====
This section penalizes individuals who perform obscene acts in public or use obscene language that may annoy the public.

- Punishment:
  - Imprisonment of up to three months.
  - A fine of up to ₹1,000.
  - Both imprisonment and fine.

==== Information Technology Act, 2000 ====
===== Section 67: Punishment for Publishing or Transmitting Obscene Material in Electronic Form =====
This section criminalizes the publication and transmission of lascivious or prurient content in electronic form.

- Punishment:
  - First Conviction: Imprisonment of up to three years and a fine of up to ₹5 lakh.
  - Second or Subsequent Conviction: Imprisonment of up to five years and a fine of up to ₹10 lakh.

===== Section 67B: Protection Against Child Sexual Exploitation =====
This provision criminalizes the electronic publication, transmission, or distribution of content depicting children in sexually explicit acts.

- Punishment:
  - First Conviction: Imprisonment of up to five years and a fine of up to ₹10 lakh.
  - Subsequent Convictions: Imprisonment of up to seven years and a fine of up to ₹10 lakh.

==== Indecent Representation of Women (Prohibition) Act, 1986 ====
This act prohibits the indecent representation of women in any form, whether through advertisements, publications, or online content. If the show's content objectified or misrepresented women in a harmful manner, it could face legal action under this law.

==== Protection of Children from Sexual Offences (POCSO) Act, 2012 ====
The POCSO Act is a comprehensive law aimed at protecting minors from sexual exploitation and abuse. If minors were exposed to explicit content or involved in inappropriate material, the show’s creators could be subject to legal scrutiny under this act.

==== Information Technology (Intermediary Guidelines and Digital Media Ethics Code) Rules, 2021 ====
These rules regulate digital platforms and require them to monitor and remove unlawful content. The Indian government and regulatory bodies have directed online platforms to remove controversial content that violates these guidelines.

== Other countries ==
Various countries have different standings on the types of materials that they as legal bodies permit their citizens to have access to and disseminate among their local populations. The set of these countries' permissible content vary widely accordingly with some having extreme punishment up to and including execution for members who violate their restrictions, as in the case of Iran where the current laws against pornography now include death sentences for those convicted of producing pornography.

== See also ==
- Blasphemy
- Censorship
- Ecchi
- Flag desecration
- Freedom of speech
- Grotesque body
- Indecency
- Indecent exposure
- Insult
- Lascivious behavior
- Legal status of Internet pornography
- Obscene libel
- Obscene phone call
- Obscene Publications Acts
- Profanity
- Public morality
- Rudeness
- Seven dirty words
- Sexual norm
- Taboo
- Vulgarity
