= Ajmer rape case =

Coerced sexual exploitation case of girls in Rajasthan, India

1992 Ajmer serial gangrape and blackmailing scandal
- Date: 1990–1992
- Type: Sexual abuse and blackmailing (Estimated 250 (1991–1992, according to the media report) aged approximately 11–20
- Reporter: Deenbandhu Chaudary and Santosh Gupta; Dainik Navajyoti.
- Inquiries: Rajasthan Police (1992–2021)
- Trial: Rajasthan High Court and Supreme Court of India
- Convictions: Farooq Chishti: spent 6.5 years in jail under Section 376/120B, released.; Anwar Chisthi, Shamshuddin (Maredona), Moijullah (Puttan) and Ishrat Ali sentenced to 10 years from 1998; Anwar and Maredona under Section 376/120B, rest under Section 376.; Naseem (Tarzan), Nafees Chisthi, Salim Chisthi, Iqbal Bhati, Sohail Ghani and Zameer Hussain sentenced to life imprisonment; Tarzan under Section 376/120B and Section 37, rest under Section 376/120B.; Zahoor Chishti convicted under Section 377, still under trial for other charges.

The 1992 Ajmer rape scandal was a series of gangrapes and blackmailing in which 250 female students, aged between 11 and 20, were reportedly victims of a series of gang rapes and blackmailing. The perpetrators, led by Farooq and Nafees Chishti, were members of the hereditary caretaker Khadim family of Ajmer Sharif Dargah and leaders of the Indian Youth Congress in Ajmer. Over several years, ending in 1992, they lured victims to remote farmhouses or bungalows, where they were sexually assaulted by one or several of the men and photographed naked or otherwise revealing positions to prevent the women from speaking out. The scandal came to light through a local newspaper, Dainik Navajyoti, and subsequent police investigations, amid allegations of prior knowledge by local authorities.

N.K. Patni, the then Superintendent of Police of the CID Crime Branch, noted that the case emerged during a period of heightened communal tension. He highlighted the challenges in investigating the matter without it acquiring communal overtones, particularly given that the victims were young Hindu girls and the accused came from Muslim families with religious and local influence.

In September 1992, 18 offenders were charged, one of whom died by suicide in 1994. The first eight to stand trial received life sentences, though four were later acquitted by the Rajasthan High Court in 2001. In 2007, Farooq Chishti was convicted by a fast-track court but was released in 2013 after serving time. Retired Rajasthan DGP Omendra Bhardwaj noted the influence of the accused made it difficult for victims to testify. The Supreme Court acknowledged that many victims refused to testify due to the stigma and potential repercussions on their future lives, a concern acknowledged by the Supreme Court in its observations. The case was also linked to other criminal activities in the region, including the involvement of Khaleel Chishti, who was implicated in a murder case in Ajmer in 1992.

== Incidents ==
The blackmail operation was discovered to have been carried out by a chain of serial offenders. A specific group of local politically influential men were targeting young girls: for example, firstly Farooq Chishti lured one of the girls from Sophia Secondary School in Ajmer and took sexual photos of her. Then, the accused blackmailed the girl into introducing them to her classmates and friends. Eventually, other girls would be raped, sexually exploited, and have their pictures taken at a farmhouse. The cycle continued so forth, with the gang continuing to expand its operations and victimize an increasing number of girls. They photographed the girls in compromising positions, using the images to exploit the victims.

== Timeline ==
The known timeline of the Ajmer rape scandal begins in 1990. Among the victims was a Class 12 student at Sophia Senior Secondary School, who aspired to join the Congress party. She was introduced to Nafees and Farooq Chishti by an acquaintance who assured her that they were influential and could help her achieve her political ambitions.

According to her testimony, documented in a 2003 Supreme Court judgment, she was groomed, sexually assaulted, and subsequently blackmailed by the Chishti duo. They coerced her into bringing other young women into their circle, often under the guise of helping them join the Congress. Nafees and Farooq gained her trust by offering her a lift in their van and promising to discuss her entry into the party. Instead, they took her to a farmhouse, where Nafees assaulted her and threatened her life if she disclosed the incident. This marked the beginning of a series of similar assaults.

The perpetrators, sometimes introduced to the victims as her brothers, would invite them to "parties" at a farmhouse or Farooq's bungalow on Foy Sagar Road. Many of these women were drugged and sexually assaulted by one or more men, who often took photographs of the rapes to blackmail the victims into silence.

She also testified that she and another victim initially sought help from a police constable, who introduced them to an officer in the Ajmer police special branch. However, after receiving threatening calls, it became clear that the police were either complicit or ineffective in providing protection. At one point, a gang member, Moijullah, cryptically warned her that "the game which they were playing was a game they had played long back," underscoring the deeply entrenched nature of the criminal network.

The Chishti family, who held significant religious and political influence, were allegedly shielded by their status. According to journalist Santosh Gupta, law enforcement officials, from Superintendents of Police to Station House Officers, often sought the Chishtis' mediation in legal matters, making it difficult to hold them accountable.

The scandal came to public attention when employees at a photo lab, where the perpetrators had their incriminating photographs developed, began circulating the images. A reel developer, boasted about the photos to his neighbor, Devendra Jain, who then made copies and distributed them to Dainik Navajyoti and the local Vishwa Hindu Parishad (VHP) group. The VHP workers forwarded the images to the police, prompting an inquiry.

On 21 April 1992, journalist Santosh Gupta published the first report on the sexual exploitation in Dainik Navajyoti. However, it was the second report on 15 May 1992, which included blurred images of the victims, that caused a public outcry. The case gained widespread attention, leading to a complete shutdown of Ajmer on 18 May 1992, driven by public outrage over the scandal.

== Investigation ==
The editor of Navjyoti, Deenbandhu Chaudhary, had admitted that the local law enforcement authorities were aware of the scandal almost since a year before the story broke, but they allowed the local politicians to stall the investigations.

Chaudhary stated that they finally decided to go ahead with the story because that seemed to be the only way to prod the local administration into action. Finally, the police lodged an FIR against eight of the accused. Further investigations led to 18 men in total being charged and tensions ran high in the town for several days.

The case was indirectly connected to Khaleel Chishti, a relative of the accused, who had previously been implicated in a 1992 murder case in Ajmer, suggesting possible longstanding familial associations with criminal activity.

People took to the streets to protest and tension in the community grew. A three-day bandh was imposed and subsequent news of the widespread exploitation and blackmail started coming in. Retired Rajasthan DGP Omendra Bhardwaj, who was the Deputy Inspector General of Police in Ajmer at that time, stated that the social and financial aristocracy of the accused stopped many more victims from coming forward. The number of victims was believed to be several hundred. Another realisation was that many of the victims had already died by suicide.

The Rajasthan police's Special Operations Group (SOG) arrested Salim Chishti, 42, one of the accused from Khalid Mohalla in Ajmer town on 4 January 2012.

== Accused charged ==
All of the 19 accused were charged with abduction. The main accused Farooq Chishti was president of the Ajmer Youth Congress. Nafees Chishti was the vice-president of Ajmer Indian National Congress and Anwar Chishti was the Joint Secretary of Ajmer Indian National Congress. Moijullah (alias Puttan), Ishrat Ali, Anwar Chishti, and Shamshuddin (alias Meradona) were also sentenced by the court.

Multiple main accused of the case attempted to flee, absconder Suhail Ghani hid for 26 years before surrendering in 2018 while absconder Salim Chishti was arrested in 2012. Another main accused, Syed Almas, is still a fugitive and wanted in India. It is believed that he fled to the United States. Central Bureau of Investigation issued an Interpol red notice for his on the charges of rape and criminal extortion.

== Trial ==
According to the police and women-focused NGOs, it was difficult to build a case against the perpetrators, as most victims were reluctant to come forward. However, the photographs and videos used to blackmail the victims helped identify the accused and build the case against them.

Thirty victims were identified in the investigations. Out of these, only about a dozen filed cases, and ten later backed out. Only two victims pursued the case.

Of the 18 accused who were charged with abduction and gang rape under the Indian Penal Code and Indecent Representation of Women (Prohibition) Act, one has since died by suicide. In 2003, the Rajasthan High Court upheld the decision. In 2004 the Supreme Court dismissed both appeals filed by the state, as well as the convicts. A bench comprising Justice N. Santosh Hegde and Justice BP Singh reduced the life sentence to 10 years, they were released immediately as they had completed their sentence.

Farooq Chishti was declared schizophrenic, but later convicted by a fast track court in 2007. The Rajasthan High Court upheld the decision but reduced his sentence leading to his release in 2013.

On 20 August 2024, 6 accused were sentenced to life imprisonment by a special POCSO court in Ajmer. The convicts are Nafees Chishti, Naseem alias Tarzan, Salim Chishti, Iqbal Bhati, Sohail Ghani and Syed Zameer Hussain. Among them, Naseem alias Tarzan went absconding in 1994, and Zahoor Chishti was found guilty under Section 377 (unnatural sex) of the Indian Penal Code and his case was transferred to another court. They were also fined ₹5 lakh each.

== Victims ==
After the rape, most victims experienced harassment and threats, with no support from society or their families. According to police investigations, about six victims allegedly took their own lives. Ajmer Mahila Samooh (Ajmer Women Association), who tried to take up the victim's cause, withdrew after receiving threats. Small-time tabloids were quite a sensation in Ajmer at that time. Many victims were even allegedly blackmailed further by these tabloids and local papers. They had access to the explicit images of the girls, and the owners and publishers sought money from the families of the girls to keep them hidden.

Due to the multiple surrendering, sentencing, or any other development in the case, the survivors had to return to court and narrate their stories, causing them to relive the horror over and over. This caused many of the victims and witnesses to turn hostile. The Supreme Court, while reviewing appeals, observed that societal stigma and fear of repercussions deterred many victims from testifying, contributing to the weakening of the case.

== Aftermath ==
People took to the streets to protest, and communal tension grew. A three-day bandh was observed and much subsequent news of the widespread exploitation and blackmail started coming in. Ajmer was completely shutdown on 18 May 1992, following the public outrage after the victim's photographs were published in the newspaper. The police were also criticized for not acting even after having information about the ongoing sexual abuse. It had also stalled the case because the local politicians warned action against the accused would lead to massive community tension.

Musabbir Hussain, Joint Secretary of the Anjuman Committee which oversees the Ajmer Dargah, told Indian Express, "It's a case that nobody in Ajmer wants to talk about because of the nature of the crime. It's a blot on our city's history."

N. K. Patni, then Superintendent of Police of the CID-Crime Branch, remarked that the case emerged during a period of escalating communal tensions in India. Patni highlighted the challenges in preventing the communalization of the case, given that the main accused were Muslims and most victims were Hindus.

== Media portrayal ==
Ajmer 92, a film based upon the scandal was released on 21 July 2023. Reacting to the film's release, Sarwar Chishti of Ajmer Dargah was heard blaming women for the crimes against them. He later apologized saying that his comments were a slip of tongue and were recorded off-the record.

== See also ==
- Rape in India
- List of scandals in India
- Religious persecution
- Ajmer 92

== Sources ==
- "The Telegraph - Calcutta : Nation". Telegraphindia.com. 3 February 2004.
