= Khadem =

- Pronunciation: Arabic: [ˈxadɪm]
- Gender: Male

Origin
- Origin: Arabic

Other names
- Related names: Hadem

Khadem (Arabic: خادم) is a given name and surname; it may refer to:

== Given name ==
- Khadem al-Qubaisi (born 1971), Emirati managing director of the IPIC

== Surname ==
- Abdelaziz Belkhadem (born 1945), Algerian politician
- Ali Khademhosseini (born 1975), Iranian-Canadian bioengineer
- Amir Reza Khadem (born 1970), Iranian wrestler
- Dhikru'llah Khadem (1904–1986), Iranian Hand of the Cause
- Mohammad Khadem (born 1935), Iranian wrestler
- Rasoul Khadem (born 1972), Iranian wrestler
- Samir El-Khadem (born 1942), Lebanese former Commander of the Lebanese Naval Forces

== Places ==
- Khademabad, village in Razaviyeh District, Mashhad County, Iran
- Khadem Anlu, village in Chapeshlu District, Dargaz County, Iran

== See also ==
- Al-Akhdam, an ethnic group of Yemen
- Khadem (caste), a social group of India
- Khadim (disambiguation)
