= Khadim =

Khadim may refer to:

== People ==
Given name

- Khadim Ali (born 1978), Australian painter
- Khadim Diaw (born 1998), Mauritanian footballer
- Khadim Faye (born 1970), Senegalese footballer
- Khadim Hussain (disambiguation), multiple people
- Khadim Kane (born 2005), Senegalese footballer
- Khadim N'Diaye (born 1985), Senegalese footballer
- Khadim Ndiaye (born 2000), Senegalese professional soccer player
- Khadim Rassoul (born 1995), Senegalese professional footballer

Surname

- Ataur Rahman Khan Khadim (1933–1971), Bangladeshi engineer and academic
- Hussain Bakhsh Khadim (1930–1992), Pakistani singer and poet
- Mu'nis al-Khadim (845–933), Abbasid military leader
- Qiamuddin Khadim (1901–1979), Afghan scholar, poet and politician
- Sirajullah Khadim (born 1988), Bangladeshi cricketer
- Yazaman al-Khadim (died 891), Abbasid governor and military leader

Other name

- Abu Sulaym Faraj al-Khadim al-Turki, Abbasid court eunuch and official
- Chaudhry Khadim Hussain, Pakistani politician
- Joher Khadim Rassoul (born 1995), Senegalese footballer

== Places ==
- Khadim Nagar National Park, a national park in Bangladesh
- Serabit el-Khadim, an archaeological site and ancient turquoise mine in Egypt

== Businesses and organisations ==
- Khadim's, an Indian footwear company

== See also ==
- Khadem (disambiguation)
- Khadim, an alternative spelling of the Khadem caste, a Muslim community in Rajasthan, India
