= Clinton Bennett =

British–American religion scholar and Baptist minister (born 1955)

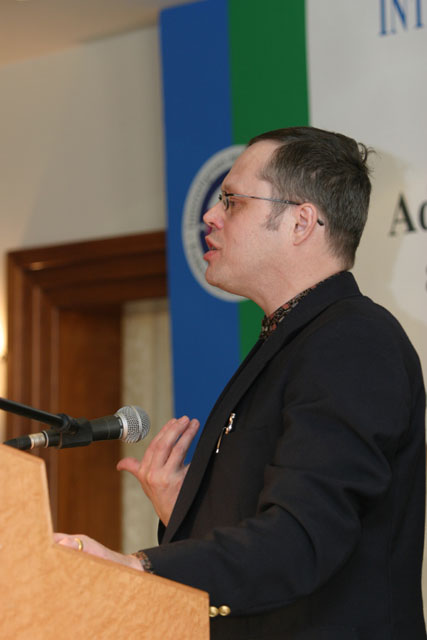
Clinton Bennett

Clinton Bennett (born 7 October 1955, Staffordshire, England) is a British-American scholar of Religious studies and participant in interfaith dialogue, specializing in Islamic studies and the relations between Islam and other religions. He is also a published author.

== Overview ==
Clinton Bennett has been an ordained Baptist Christian minister, a Christian missionary in Bangladesh, a professor in the UK and US, Director of Interfaith relations at the British Council of Churches and a writer.

He is a Fellow of the Royal Asiatic Society, and the Royal Anthropological Institute.

He has also taken part in the dialogue activities of the World Council of Churches.

He became a naturalized U.S. citizen in 2012.

Ahmad Shafaat writes, "Bennett's approach allows him to treat Islamic traditions and their Muslim interpretations with sensitivity and respect, not often found among Christian writings on Islam."

== Biography ==
=== Early life ===
Bennett was born in 1955 in Tettenhall, which was then an urban district in Staffordshire, England. He was raised in Australia and after gaining his School Certificate, he worked in Sydney as an officer in the civil service from 1972 to 1973.

=== Education ===
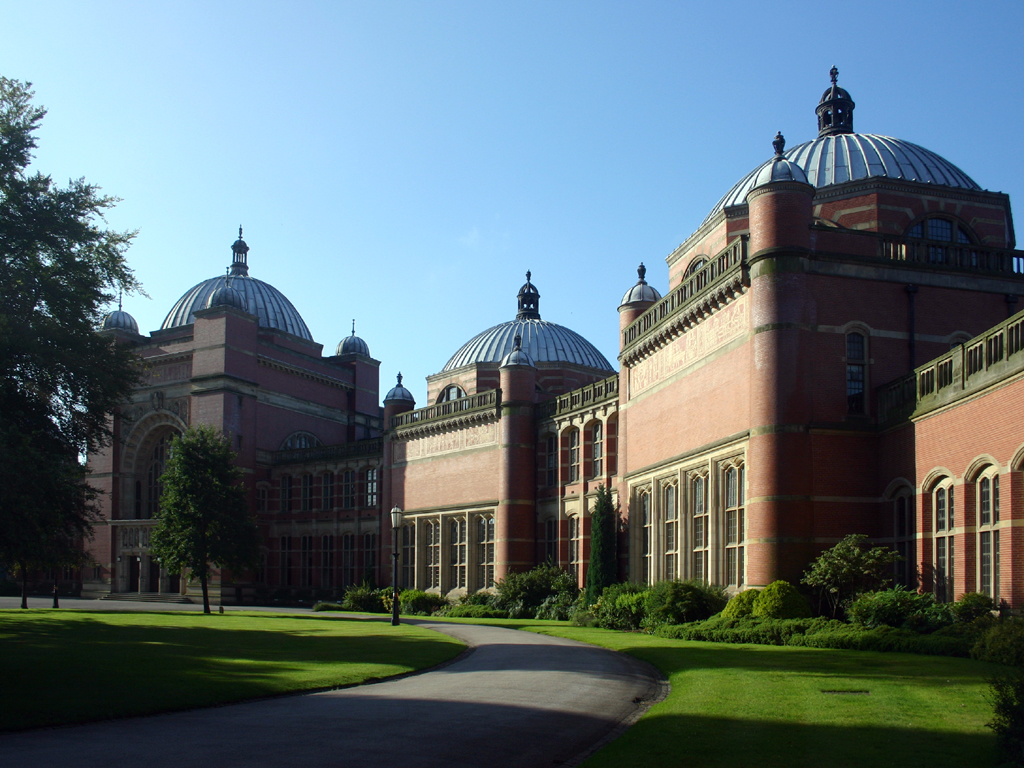
Aston Webb Building, University of Birmingham where Bennett obtained his MA and PhD.

He started training for the Baptist Ministry at Northern Baptist College, Manchester in 1974 and graduated with a BA in Theology from the University of Manchester in July 1978. He was ordained on 2 July 1978.

He spent a year at the Selly Oak Colleges preparing to serve with the Baptist Missionary Society in Bangladesh and received a Certificate in the Study of Islam from University of Birmingham.

In Bangladesh, he studied the language, pastored a congregation and tutored for the Bangladesh College of Christian Theology.

Returning to Birmingham in 1983 he gained an MA in 1985 and PhD in 1990, both in Islamic Studies.

In 1996 he received his MEd from the University of Oxford.

=== Career ===
Between 1985 and 1992 he was associate minister of Highgate Baptist Church, Birmingham.

Between 1986 and 1987 he was also part time Free Church Chaplain at Aston University, Birmingham

Between 1987 and 1992 Bennett was executive secretary of the Committee for Relations with People of Other Faiths at the British Council of Churches' Conference for World Mission.

He joined the faculty of Westminster College, Oxford in 1992 and taught there until 1998 when he became an associate professor of religion at Baylor University, Texas.

From 2017 to 2022 he was a member of the pastoral team at a United Methodist Church.

After a period working for an internet encyclopedia project he began teaching part-time at State University of New York at New Paltz in 2008 and has also taught at Marist College, Poughkeepsie.

On 17 December 2022 he was formally incardinated as a priest of the Old Catholic Apostolic Church by its Patriarch.

=== Involvement in the World Council of Churches ===
Bennett was a Consultant at the Baar Meeting of the WCC's Dialogue Sub Unit (1988) and a member of the Sub Unit's Working Party that drafted Issues in Christian Muslim Relations: Ecumenical Considerations (1991).

From 1992 to 1998 he was a member of the World Council of Churches' Consultation on the Church and the Jewish People (CCJP) representing the Baptist Union of Great Britain, attending meetings in Geneva (1992) and Budapest (1994).

=== Alliance of Baptists ===
He currently represents the Alliance of Baptists on the Inter-religious Relations and Collaboration on Topics of Mutual Concern Convening Table of the National Council of Churches US and on several national dialogues.

=== Links with the Indian subcontinent and the Muslim world ===
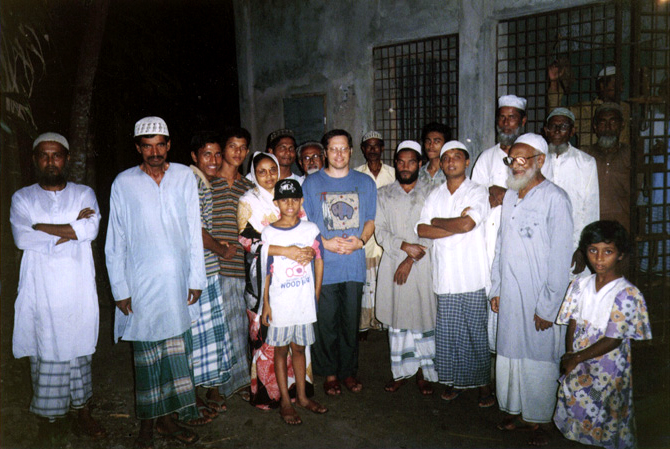
Clinton Bennett outside a mosque in Bangladesh while researching for his book on Muhammad. A. H. Mathias Zahniser describes Bennett's In Search of Muhammad (1998) as "a very personal narrative. Bennett takes us to mosques and coffee shops where he lays bare the depth of the Muslim experience of Muhammad".

Bennett has regularly researched and taught at summer schools in India mainly at the Henry Martyn Institute in Hyderabad, and for The Association for Theological Education by Extension based at Bangalore. He has attended conferences in or traveled to six Muslim majority states.

== Publications ==
Bennett has written a number of books on the history of Islam and Christian/Muslim relations.

=== Victorian Images of Islam ===
Bennett's first book was published in 1992. Victorian Images of Islam was well received and has been widely cited. The book was described as an "illuminating study into an overlooked corner of Victorian religious history".

Bennett described contributors as confrontational or conciliatory, analysing the work of three scholars in each category. The three conciliators were Charles Forster, Frederick Denison Maurice and Reginald Bosworth Smith and the three confrontationalists were William Muir, William St. Clair Tisdall and John Drew Bate. Conciliators were those "Western writers who questioned the prevailing attitude of cultural and religious superiority that led to a belittling of everything non-European" Confrontationalists perpetuated traditional anti-Muslim polemic.

Bennett stressed that the story of Christian-Muslim encounter includes examples of harmonious co-existence as well as of hostility. By remembering these experiences we can ensure that future relations are not solely defined by a negative historical memory.

Ahmad Gunney called the book "a valuable contribution to the debate on the important question of Islam and the West" and said that "the Baptist minister" had to a "certain extent" complemented "the work of three Muslim writers, M. A. Anees, Syed Zainul Abedin and Z. Sardar". One Muslim reviewer suggested that the book's study by Muslim Imams-in-training might "go some way towards breaking down barriers and misconceptions".

=== "In Search of" book series ===
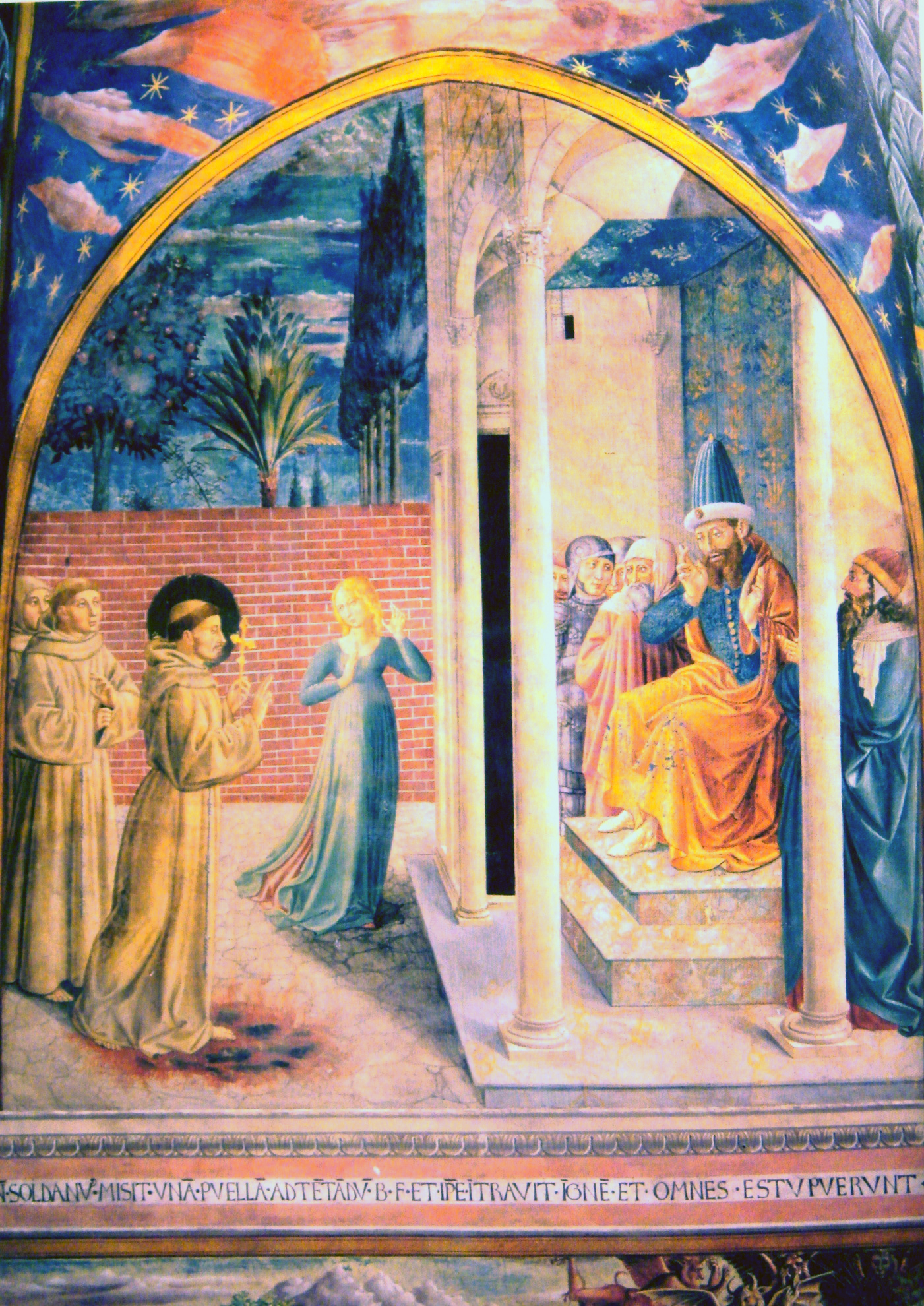
Francis of Assisi before the Sultan, Al-Kamil. Bennett writes, "St. Francis' ... willingness to negotiate peace with the Sultan of Egypt, and his rubric that while his Friars could pursue 'disputes and controversy', another method was to 'preach the word of God', qualify him as a conciliator."

In 1996, Bennett published the first of five books with 'In Search of' in their title. In Search of the Sacred: Anthropology and the Study of Religion called for a combination of historical, textual and participant observation research to shed light on how religion is lived, as well as on its history and official dogmas. He argued that no researcher is neutral and that all people need to engage in reflexivity to guard against bias and the imposition of a priori presuppositions. One reviewer commented, "suddenly the act of observation becomes the subject of observation".

Bennett followed this in 1998 with In Search of Muhammad and in 2001 with In Search of Jesus: Insider and Outsider Images. Both of these were well received.

The fourth 'In Search of' book, In Search of Solutions: The Problem of Religion and Conflict appeared in 2008 as part of a series edited by Rosemary Radford Ruether and Lisa Isherwood. The fifth, In Search of Understanding: Reflections on Christian Engagement with Muslims after Four Decades, with a foreword by Ataullah Siddiqui, was published in 2019,

== Selected publications ==
=== Books ===
- 1992, Victorian Images of Islam, London: Grey Seal, pp 204 (ISBN 1-85640-028-X); republished 2009, Piscataway, NJ: Gorgias Press (ISBN 9781607246732)
- 1996, In Search of the Sacred: Anthropology and the Study of Religions London: Cassell Academic (ISBN 0304 336815 hb; 0304 336823 pb) pp 218
- 1996, with Foreman-Peck, Lorraine and Higgins, Chris, Researching Into Teaching Methods in Colleges and Universities, London: Kogan Page (ISBN 0-7494-1768-4) pp 136, republished 2013 by Routledge
- 1998, In Search of Muhammad, London: Cassell Academic (ISBN 0-304-70401-6) pp 276.
- 2001, In Search of Jesus: Insider - Outsider Images London: Continuum (ISBN 0826449166) pp 364
- 2005, Muslims and Modernity: An Introduction to the Issues and Debates, London: Continuum (ISBN 082645481X) pp 286
- 2008, Understanding Christian Muslim Relations Past and Present, London: Continuum (ISBN 9780826487834)
- 2008, In Search of Solutions: the problem of religion and conflict, London: Equinox (ISBN 978-1845532390), republished 2014 by Routledge
- 2009, Interpreting the Qur'an: A Guide for the Uninitiated, London: Continuum (ISBN 9780826499448)
- 2010, Studying Islam: The Critical Issues, London: Continuum (ISBN 978-0-82649550-1)
- 2010, Muslim Women of Power: Gender, Politics and Culture in Islam, London: Continuum (ISBN 9780826400871)
- 2012, South Asian Sufis: Devotion, Deviation and Destiny, edited with Charles M. Ramsey, London: Continuum (ISBN 9781441151278)
- 2013, Bloomsbury Companion to Islamic Studies, (editor) London: Bloomsbury (ISBN 9781441127884)
- 2017, Sufism, Pluralism and Democracy, edited with Sarwar Alam, Equinox, Sheffield (ISBN 9781781792216)
- 2019, In Search of Understanding: Reflections on Christian Engagement with Muslims after Four Decades, Eugene, OR: Wipf and Stock (ISBN 9781532646553)
- 2023, Islam as Imagined in Eighteenth and Nineteenth Century English Literature, NY: Routledge (ISBN 9780367714536)

=== Chapters ===
- 1994, "Islam", pp 95–122, in J Holm with J Bowker (ed) Making Moral Decisions, London: Pinter (ISBN 1 85567 096 8).
- 1994, "Islam", pp 113–141, in J Holm with J Bowker (ed), Picturing God, London: Pinter (ISBN 1-85567-101-8).
- 1994, "Islam", pp 88–114, in J Holm with J Bowker, Sacred Place, London: Pinter (ISBN 1-85567-104-2).
- 1994, "Islam", pp 90–112, in J Holm with J Bowker (ed), Rites of Passage, London: Pinter (ISBN 1 85567 103 4).
- 1997, "Islam and Muhammad Iqbal," pp 127–143 in Modern Spiritualities: An Inquiry, ed Brown, Laurence, Farr, Bernard C and Hoffmann, Joseph R, Amherst, NY, Prometheous (ISBN 1-57392-112-2).
- 2008, "A Christian response to the Absence of the Cross in Islam", 171-179, in David Emmanuel Singh (ed) Jesus and the Cross: Reflections of Christians from Islamic Contexts, Oxford; Carlisle, Cumbria and Waynesboro, GA: Regnum/Paternoster (ISBN 978-1-870345-65-1).
- 2009, "W. R. W. Stephens, Christianity and Islam", xxxiii - xxvii, in W. R. W Stephens and Clinton Bennett, Christianity and Islam: The Bible and the Koran, NY: Gorgias Press (ISBN 9781607244127).
- 2010, "Subdivisions in Islam," pp 129–147 and "Mystical Islam," pp 148–150 in Marshall Cavendish Reference, Islamic beliefs, practices, and cultures, Tarrytown, NY: Marshall Cavendish Reference. (ISBN 9780761479260).
- 2011, "States, Politics and Political Groups," 144-163, "Focus on Al-Qaeda," 164-167, "Islamism in the 21st Century," 192-215, in Marshall Cavendish Reference, Modern Muslim Societies, Tarrytown, NY: Marshall Cavendish Reference (ISBN 978-0-7614-7927-7).
- 2011, "Saints, Incarnation and Christian-Muslim Relations: Reflections inspired by encountering Bangladeshi Islam", 99–111, in David Emmanuel Singh (ed)Jesus and the Incarnation: Reflections of Christians from Islamic Contexts. Oxford: Regnum Books (ISBN 978-1-870345-90-3).
- 2013, "Muslim Ideas about the 'Resurrection,'"155-162, in David Emmanuel Singh (ed) Jesus and the Resurrection: Reflections of Christians from Islamic Contexts, Oxford: Regnum Books (ISBN 978-1-908355-58-4)
- 2014, "Empires and Religions: Colonialism, Postcolonialism, and Orientalism," in Paul Hedges (ed), Controversies in Contemporary Religion: Education, Law, Politics, Society and Spirituality, Volume 1, 273-302, Santa Barbara, CA: ABC-CLIO (ISBN 9781440803420)
- 2015, "Christian-Muslim Relations in the USA: A Postmodern Analysis after 9/11," 151-166 in Paul Hedges (ed) Contemporary Muslim-Christian Encounters: Developments, Diversity and Dialogue, London: Bloomsbury (ISBN 9781472588531)
- 2017, "Christians and Muḥammad," pp. 296–303, and "Christian Minorities in Islamic Contexts," pp. 349–357, in Routledge Handbook on Christian-Muslim Relations, ed. David Thomas, London, Routledge (ISBN 978-1-138-81871-2)
- 2017, "Anabaptist Promotion of Church State Separation," 757-759, "Emancipation of Jews in France," 823-824, "Emancipation of Jews in Germany," 862-863 in F. Curta, Great events in religion: An encyclopedia of pivotal events in religious history, Santa Barbara, CA, ABC-CLIO (ISBN 9781610695657)
- 2018, "Education of Religious Minorities in Muslim Countries," pp. 377–387 in Handbook on Islamic Education, ed. Holger Daun and Reza Arjmand, Springer: Dordrecht (ISBN 9783319646824)
- 2019, "Syncretistic Sufi Gnosticism in South and South East Asia," pp. 595–602 in The Gnostic World, ed. Garry W Trompf, Gunner B. Mikklesten, and Jay Johnston, London: Routledge (ISBN 978-1-138-67393-9)
- 2019, "Promoting Social and Religious Harmony: Bāul's origin and migration West and Roji Sarker's performance in the British Bangladeshi Diaspora," pp. 72–92 in Cultural Fusion of Sufi Islam: Alternative Paths to Mystical Faith ed. Sarwar Alam, Abingdon: Routledge (ISBN 9781138615038)
- 2019, "William Brackney - Linking Baptist Genetics, Human Rights, and Openness to the Salvation of All," pp 56–72, in Crossing Baptist Boundaries: a Festschrift in Honor of William Henry Brackney, ed. Erich Geldback, Macon, GA: Mercer University Press (ISBN 9780881466942)

=== Articles ===
- 1992, "The Legacy of Henry Martyn" pp 10–15, International Bulletin of Missionary Research, Vol 16 No 1.
- 1993, "The Legacy of Lewis Bevan Jones" pp 126129, International Bulletin of Missionary Research, Vol 17 No 3.
- 1996, "The Legacy of Karl Gottlieb Pfander" pp 76–81, International Bulletin of Missionary Research, Vol 20 No 2

== Bibliography ==
- Anderson, Gerald H (ed) (1998) Biographical Dictionary of Christian Missions, NY, Simon & Schuster Macmillan (ISBN 0-02-864604-5)
- Contemporary Authors (1997) "Bennett, Clinton" Vol. 157, p 20, Detroit, MI: Gale Research, ISBN 0-7876-1183-2
- New World Encyclopedia: Selected Articles (2008) "Project Contributors: Clinton Bennett", p 462, 2008 (editor-in-chief Frank Kaufmann), St. Paul, MN: Paragon House (ISBN 978-1930549494) available at Clinton Bennett
- Gellner, David (1996) "Review of Clinton Bennett's In Search of the Sacred", 46-7, Discernment, new series 3: 2 (ISSN 0958-5532)
- Riddell, Peter G (2006) "Review of Clinton Bennett's Muslims and Modernity with Islam in Britain (Institute for the Study of Islam and Christianity) and Bill Musk's Kissing Cousins? Christians and Muslims face to face", Church Times, 2 June
