= Pilgrimage diplomacy =

Pilgrimage diplomacy or dargah diplomacy is a new term in political science and international relations. It usually refers to officials or politicians traveling to a non-friendly or enemy country under the pretext of pilgrimage or visiting a holy shrine, but with the aim of political discussion or a political visit. An example of such a pilgrimage is Iranian officials' travel to Mecca and to an Iraqi holy shrine in the 1970s and 1980s. Another example is Pakistani President Asif Ali Zardari's "private spiritual journey" to India to visit the Ajmer Sharif Dargah, which ended with acceptance by Indian Prime Minister Manmohan Singh to travel to Pakistan. Some mass media suggested that the pilgrimage visit should set the stage for the two sides to tackle contentious issues tensions and obstacles.
