= Anderkoti =

Muslim Religious Group In Pakistan

Regions with significant populations
- • India • Pakistan

Languages
- • Hindi • Rajasthani • Urdu

Religion
- Islam

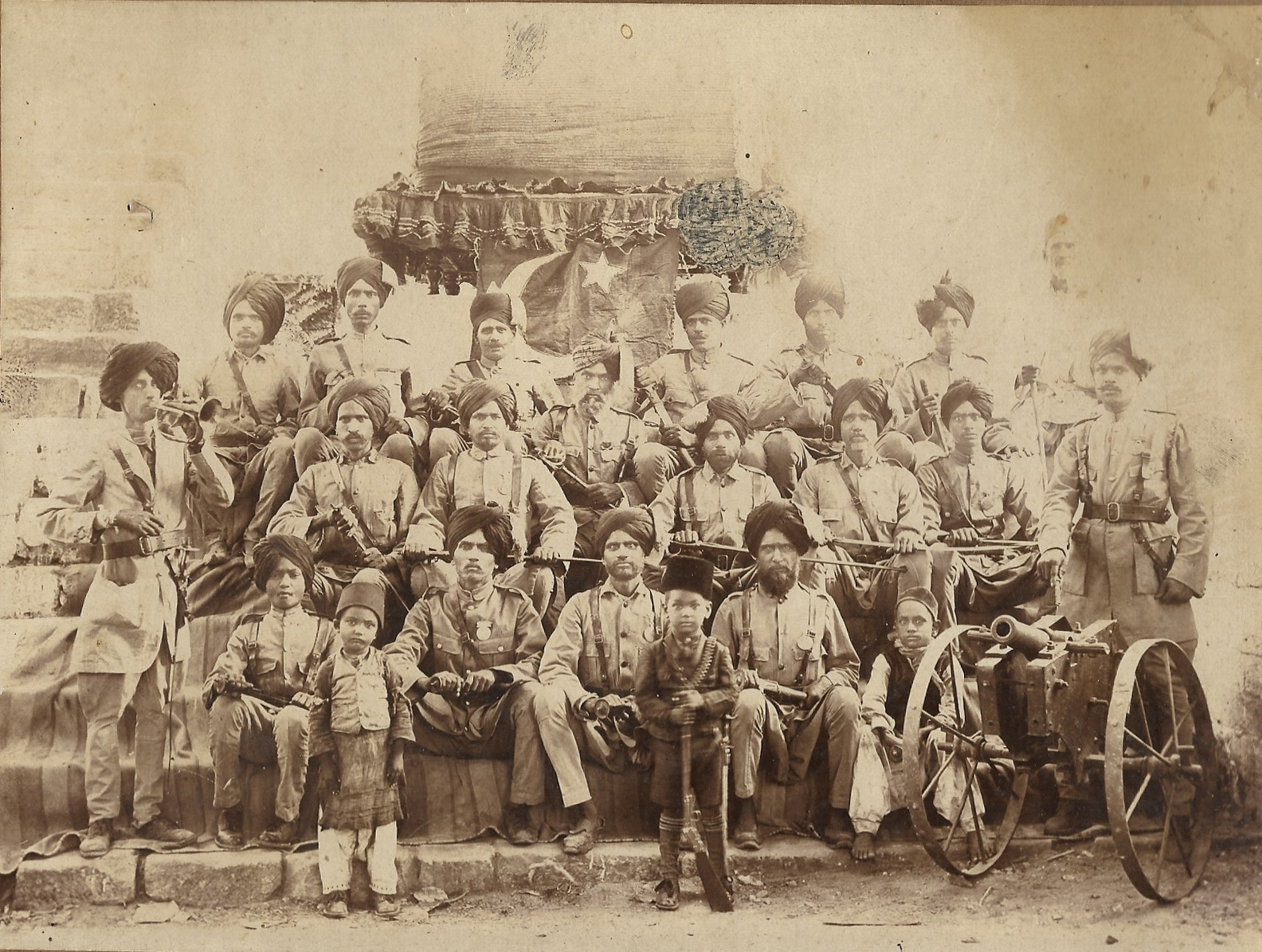
Anjuman Khadim-ul-Qoum Anderkotian circa 1922

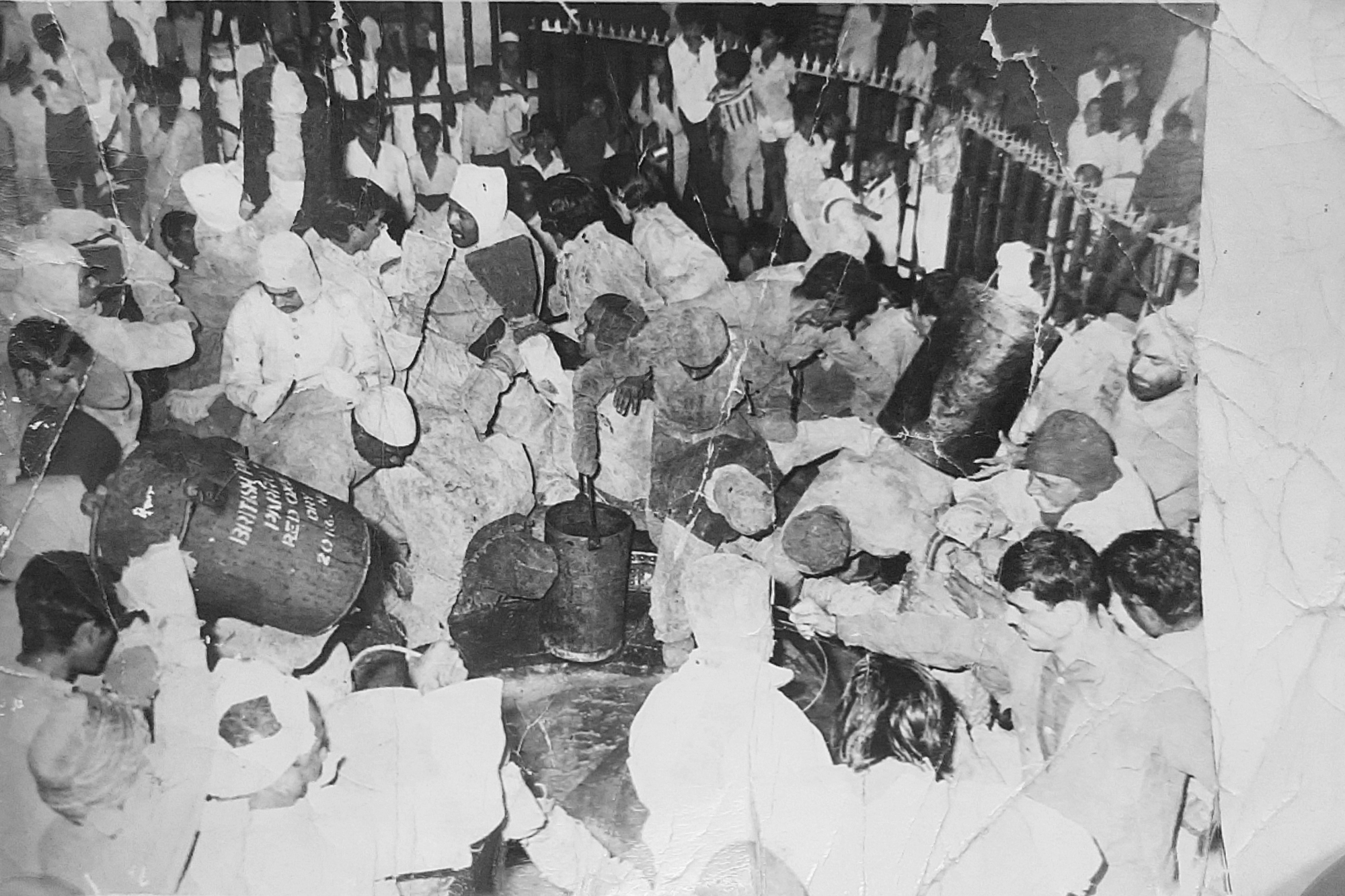
Looting of Deg

The Anderkoti, Koti or Kotiyan (Urdu; اندر کوٹی) are a Muslim community found in Ajmer in India, and in Pakistan.

== History and origin ==
Businessmen, moneylenders and wealthy people hire them as bodyguards for their fearlessness. In the past when the langar used to be cooked it was first set apart for the foreign pilgrims, and then it is the hereditary privilege of the people of Anderkot, and of the menials of Dargah to empty the cauldron. The custom of "looting of deg" is very ancient but no accounts of its origin can be given. However, now this practice has been discontinued.

== Haidos or Haiydos ==
In the Muharram month of Islamic calendar the Anderkotis do a ritual with their sharp swords known as "Haidos or Haydos ". People form a circle and move their sword in wild confusion on the 9th Muharram after Isha and on 10th after Zuhar Prayers. After the Partition Anderkoti people who migrated to Pakistan started this tradition in the Hyderabad, Sindh and still continued. Hundred men perform this and 100 Swords are given by Ajmer Administration.
