= Syed Zainul Abedin =

Indian sufi and custodian of Ajmer Sharif Dargah

Dewan Syed Zainul Abedin Ali Khan
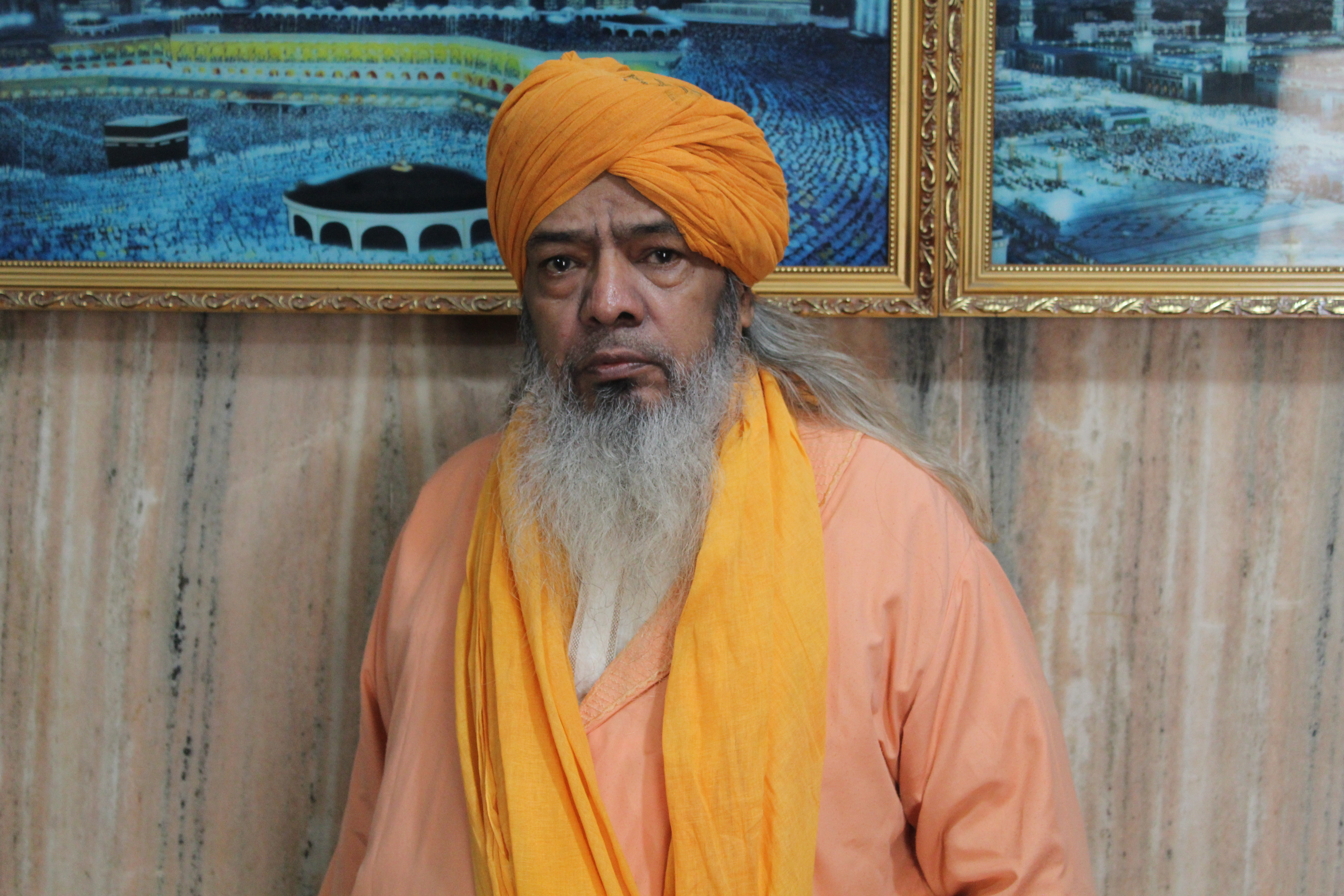
- Syed Zainul Abedin at his Office

Sajjadanasheen of Ajmer Sharif Dargah

Personal details
- Born: Ajmer, India
- Children: Syed Naseruddin Chishty (successor)
- Parent: Dewan Syed Ilmuddin Ali Khan (father)

Syed Zainul Abedin is the Dewan and Sajjada Nasheen of the Ajmer Sharif Dargah, the Shrine of Khawaja Moinuddin Chishti. He is a Sufi of the Chishti order. He is the son of Dewan Syed Ilmuddin Ali Khan, former Sajjada Nasheen.

== Lineage ==
Abedin is the direct descendant and 22nd generation of Khwaja Moinuddin Chishti, is the lawful authority according to the Apex court of India and the provisions of the Dargah Khawaja Saheb Act, 1955.]

He is the son of Syed Ilmuddin Ali Khan, who was the Sajjada Nasheen before Abedin.

== Activities ==
He used to visit and speak publicly at various shrines and other places in India and abroad, on religious and political affairs. He also visited Kanpur. Shiv Sena president Uddhav Thackeray said he should be awarded the Bharat Ratna award after he opposed the president of Pakistan to visit Dargah.

=== Ban on PFI ===
Abedin supported the decision of Government of India on Banning Popular Front of India. He stated that Muslime should not join radical figures like Popular Front of India and Social Democratic Party of India.

== Reports ==
=== Sajjada Nasheen ===
He became 29th direct descent successor of Ajmer Dargah Sajjadanashin (Spiritual Head) of the Shrine after the death of his father, Syed Ilmuddin Ali Khan.

In April 2017, Syed Alauddin Alimi alias Arif, the brother of Abedin sacked Abedin from the post of Spiritual head when Abedin spoke in support of Beef Ban and supporting ban on Triple Talaq. Alimi, a lawyer by profession, said that Abedin has to recant his statement which is against Islamic views.

In March 2018, Abedin announced his son Syed Naseeruddin Chishty as the next successor of Dargah. The Khadims of Ajmer Sharif Dargah opposed the decision of Abedin stating that it is not good to announce next successor when a Sajjada Nasheen is alive.

=== Against Khadims of Dargah ===
Abedin urged Prime Minister of India Narendra Modi to make a Committee for Religious Leader after misbehaving of history sheeter Khadim Salman Chishty supported Taliban.

In July 2022, The Khadim Salman Chishty announced bounty on killing Bharatiya Janata Party former Spokesperson Nupur Sharma when she quoted some controversial verses from Quran relating to Aisha's marriage, in response to Muslim Political Council of India spokesperson Taslim Ahmed Rehman's derogatory comments regarding Shiva and Krishna . Abedin opposed the bounty statement and stated that it is not the official stand of Dargah Committee.

=== Babri Masjid verdict ===
Abedin stated that decision of Ram Mandir or Babri Masjid is not win or lose of anyone.

=== Naming of University ===
In 2012, he opposed the renaming of Shri Kanshi Ram Ji Urdu Farsi University to Khwaja Moinuddin Chishti Language University, stating that naming a university on a Sufi Saint must be avoided.

=== Hijab ban ===
In February 2022, when an issue of Hijab Ban made a controversy in India, Abedin supported Hijab for women and stated that "Banning Hijab is like snatching rights of a girl and violating the constitution of India."

== See also ==
- Moinuddin Chishti
- Ajmer Sharif Dargah
