= Ajmer 92 =

2023 film directed by Pushpendra Singh

- Theatrical release poster
- Directed by: Pushpendra Singh
- Written by: Suraj Pal Rajak; Gyanendra Pratap Singh; Pushpendra Singh
- Produced by: Umesh Kumar Tiwari
- Starring: Karan Verma; Sumit Singh; Rajesh Sharma; Zarina Wahab; Brijendra Kala; Manoj Joshi; Sayaji Shinde
- Cinematography: Madhu Gowda
- Edited by: Sandeep Sethy
- Music by: Parthasakha Daskabi
- Production companies: U&K Films Entertainment; Sumit Motion Pictures
- Distributed by: Reliance Entertainment
- Release date: 21 July 2023
- Running time: 141 minutes
- Country: India
- Language: Hindi
- Box office: ₹1 crore

Ajmer 92 is a 2023 Indian Hindi-language crime drama film based on the 1992 Ajmer serial rapes. It is directed by Pushpendra Singh and written by Suraj Pal Rajak, Gyanendra Pratap Singh and Pushpendra Singh. The music of the film is given by Parthsakha Daskabi and all songs are written by Amrit. It stars Karan Verma and Sumit Singh.

== Plot ==
The film portrays the events that unfolded in Ajmer, Rajasthan, India, where a group of young men led by Farooq and Nafis Chishty, members of the prominent Khadim family, repeated gang-raped and blackmailed several girls including minors for several years, concluding in 1992.

== Cast ==
- Karan Verma as Madhav Verma
- Sumit Singh as Geeta Singh
- Rajesh Sharma as SP Ranjit Singh
- Ishan Mishra as Shibbu
- Alka Amin as Sumitra Verma, Madhav's mother
- Mahesh Balraj as Yaqub Ansari
- Aakash Dahiya as Mohan Singh
- Anoop Gautam as Mehboob Ansari
- Manoj Joshi as Minister
- Brijendra Kala as Jagdish Verma, Madhav's father
- Shalini Kapoor as Sunita Singh, Geeta's mother
- Seerat Kaur as Pooja
- Shehnawaz Khan as Anees Ansari
- Unnati Pandey as Shanti Bhargav
- Sayaji Shinde as DIG Shekhawat
- Zarina Wahab as Urmila
- Chelsha Gosai as Ayat

== Music ==
The music of the film is composed by Parthsakha Daskabi. All lyrics are written by Amrit.

== Controversies ==
Many Islamic organizations like Raza Academy and Jamiat Ulama e Hind have called for a ban on the film alleging that it would "create a rift in society", and that it is used to defame Khwaja Moinuddin Chishti Ajmeri.
