= Hindu Sena =

Indian militant organisation

- Leader: Vishnu Gupta
- Founded: August 10, 2011; 15 years ago
- Country: India
- Ideology: Hindutva
- Website: hindusenain.wordpress.com

The Hindu Sena (IAST: Hindu Sēnā; lit. 'Hindu Army'), is an Indian right-wing Hindutva militant organisation, founded on 10 August 2011 by Vishnu Gupta, who is also its current leader.

The Sena organized a birthday party for Donald Trump, then a candidate for U.S. President, on 14 June 2016. The Sena had previously prayed for his victory in the 2016 U.S. presidential election. In January 2016, four activists of the Hindu Sena vandalized the regional office of Pakistan International Airlines in New Delhi, demanding an end to diplomatic talks between India and Pakistan. One of the four men was arrested; the rest fled.

Hindu Sena chief Vishnu Gupta was arrested on 25 December 2015, two days after he called the police and claimed that the restaurant of the Kerala House hotel was serving beef. Later, police stated that they were considering action against Gupta under Section 182 of the Indian Penal Code (false information, with intent to cause public servant to use his lawful power to the injury of another person).

In 2019, Hindu Sena commemorated the 118th death anniversary of Queen Victoria, who ruled as the Empress of India from 1876 to 1901. Sena chief Vishnu Gupta said in the event that the "British contributed to giving India independence from foreign Islamic terrorists, tyrants, Mughals and ended hundreds of years of Islamic rule". He also claimed that the British united the kingdoms of India into a single state. He praised the British "for giving India the postal system, railways, freedom of expression, women's rights and democracy among other things". Gupta, however admitted that the British committed atrocities in India but emphasized that it was far less than the Islamic atrocities in India.

In March 2022, Hindu Sena put up posters on the statue of Alexander Pushkin in Delhi expressing support for the 2022 Russian invasion of Ukraine and calling for Greater Russia.

In October 2023, Hindu Sena put up posters expressing solidarity with Israel in the Gaza war and suggesting that "Hindus will fight for Israel".

== Criminal activities ==
On 22 September 2021, 5 men from Hindu Sena were arrested for vandalizing residence of Asaduddin Owaisi, the President of the All India Majlis-e-Ittehadul Muslimeen.

== See also ==
- List of political parties in India
