= Anjuman Syedzadgan =

Indian representative body

Anjuman Syedzadgan Ajmer
- Anjuman Moinia Fakhria Chishtiya Khuddam Khwaja Saheb ( Syedzadgan)
- Formation: 1947
- Type: Registered Society
- Headquarters: Dargah Bazar, Ajmer
- Members: 2100
- President: Syed Ghulam Qibria Chishty
- Secretary: Syed Sarwar Chishty

Anjuman Moinia Fakhriya Chishtiya Khuddam Khwaja Saheb or Anjuman Khuddam Syedzadgan is an Indian representative body of Khadims of Ajmer Sharif Dargah for the affairs and rights of the Khadim Community, registered under the Society Registration Act, 1860.

The Khadims of Ajmer Sharif (trans: Caretakers of Ajmer Sharif) is a community founded in Ajmer only who belongs to the Sayyid lineage and are descendants of Syed Khwaja Fakhruddin Gurdezi.

== See also ==
- Dargah Committee, Ajmer
- Anderkoti
