= Dargah Committee, Ajmer =

Dargah Committee, Dargah Khwaja Sahab, Ajmer
- Formation: Dargah Khwaja Saheb Act, 1955
- Purpose: To administrate arrangements, functions and maintenance of Dargah Sharif endowments
- Headquarters: Ajmer Sharif Dargah, Ajmer
- President: Sayed Sahid Hussain Rizvi
- Vice President: Munawar Khan
- Nazim & CEO: Md Nadeem
- Affiliations: Ministry of Minority Affairs, Government of India
- Website: http://gharibnawaz.minorityaffairs.gov.in

Dargah Committee Dargah Khwaja Saheb, Ajmer, is a statutory body constituted by the Ministry of Minority Affairs, Government of India, under the provisions of Section 5 of the Dargah Khwaja Saheb Act, 1955 for the administration of Dargah Sharif, Ajmer.

== Creation ==
The Dargah Khwaja Saheb Act, passed by the Parliament of India in 1955, provided for the creation of the Dargah Committee as a statutory body to manage the Dargah Sharif in Ajmer. The Dargah Committee is appointed by the Government and manages donations, takes care of the maintenance of the shrine, and runs charitable institutions like dispensaries, and guest houses for the devotees.

== Functions ==
- To administer, control and manage Dargah Endowment.
- Arrangements of the Urs of Khwaja Saheb and his Peer-o-Murseed Khwaja Usman Harooni every year.
- Providing free langar twice a day.
- To receive money and other income of Dargah Endowment and spent in sound manner.
- To determine the privileges of the Khadims and to regulate their presence in the Dargah by the grant of them licenses in that behalf, if the Committee thinks it necessary.
- Arrangements of Unani and Homeopathic dispensaries and supply of free medicine.
- Maintenance of Khwaja Model School and Darul Uloom Moinia Usmaniya.

== See also ==
- Ajmer Sharif Dargah
- Khwaja Gareeb Nawaz
