= Indecent Representation of Women (Prohibition) Act, 1986 =

Parliament of India
- Enacted by: Parliament of India
- Status: In force

The Indecent Representation of Women (Prohibition) Act, 1986 is an Act of the Parliament of India which was enacted to prohibit indecent representation of women through film, web series, advertisement or in publications, writings, paintings, figures or in any other manner. If any OTT platforms presented women as a sex object or showing nudity and obscenity towards women in its shows, then it would be a punishable offence and this may lead to banning of the series or its OTT platform.
