= Qiamuddin Khadim =

Mawlana Qiamuddin Khadim(1901 - 1979, Afghanistan, Kabul) (Pashto: مولنا قیام الدین خادم) was a renowned Afghan scholar, poet, writer, journalist, public speaker and one of the founding member of the first political party of Afghanistan, Weekh Zalmian (the vigilant youth). His scholastic achievements, political contribution and dedication to the Afghan national cause earned him the title Mawlana. He was also a senator in the era of King Mohammad Zahir Shah. He was the author and publisher of hundreds of Afghan books and articles.

== Books by Qiamuddin Khadim ==
1. د کوچنيانو اخلاقي پالنه Ethical education of children
2. نوی ژوندون New Life
3. پښتونولي Pakhtunwali
4. د شريف سرگذشت Sharif's fate
5. د ملغلرو امېل Necklace of pearls
6. بايزيد روښان Bayazid Rokhan
7. مکارم اخلاق High Ethics
8. خيالي دنيا Fantasy World
9. نبوغ او عبقريت Intelligence and Genius
10. نوې رڼا New light
11. اوسني پښتانه لیکوالان Contemporary Afghan Writers
12. لوی اصحابان Great Companions
13. کاروان Caravan
14. د نثر او نثاراو تذکره Prose and Prose writers' biography
15. پښتو کلي، دويم جلد Pakhto Kele, second volume
16. د معلم پښتو يوه برخه Pashto Teacher's co-writer
17. پښتانه شعرا ، لومړۍ لويه برخه Afghan Poets co-writer
18. د مولانا جامي د کافۍ شرحه Description of Mawlana Jami's Kafi
19. د خوشحال او رحمان موازنه The comparison of Khushal & Rahman
20. افغاني تهذيب او تمدن Afghan customary and civilization
21. د خوشحال خان پر دستار نامه شرحه The Description of Khushal Khan's Dastarnama
22. د تاريخ يوه سره پاڼه A red page of History
23. د پارتيانو حکومت The rule of Parthia
24. د کوشانيانو حکومت The rule of Kushans
25. علمي پښتونولي Scientific Pashtunwali
26. د روښانيانو مبارزې The struggles of The Rokhanians
27. پر تذکرة الاوليا تبصره A commentary on Tazkiratulawliya
28. د بابا نصيحت The Advice of Baba
29. سيد کمال او بوبو جانه Sayed Kamal & Bobo jan
30. غلجي په تاريخ کې Ghilji in the course of history
31. د مور حماسه Enthusiasm of Mother
32. لرغونې پښتانه قومونه Ancient Afghan Tribes
33. ټولنپال افغان مونوفېسټ Social Afghan Mono fest
34. نصوص الحکم Provisions of Governance
35. د مور مينه Mother's love
36. بلکا Balka
37. پښتون او پښتونولي Pakhtun & Pakhtunwali
38. زما د ژوند کيسه The story of my life
39. زريادريس او اوداتيس کيسه The story of Zaryadis & Odatis
40. کره پښتو گرامر Concise Pashto Grammar
41. نوې لار The New path
42. مکالمات Conversation
43. غريزه حب الخير Instinct Philanthropy
