= Khademabad =

Khademabad خادم اباد
- Village
- Location within Iran
- Coordinates: 36°13′02″N 59°48′24″E
- Country: Iran
- Province: Razavi Khorasan
- County: Mashhad
- Bakhsh: Razaviyeh
- Rural District: Meyami

Population (2006)
  - Total: 479
- Time zone: UTC+3:30 (IRST)
  - Summer (DST): UTC+4:30 (IRDT)

Khademabad (Persian: خادم اباد, also Romanized as Khādemābād and Khādemabād; also known as Kalāteh-ye Khādemābād) is a village in Meyami Rural District, Razaviyeh District, Mashhad County, Razavi Khorasan Province, Iran. At the 2006 census, its population was 479, in 112 families.
