= Khadim Hussain =

Khadim Hussain may refer to:

- Khadim Hussain Wattoo, Pakistani politician
- Khadim Hussain Rizvi, Pakistani cleric
- Khadim Hussain (cricketer), Pakistani cricketer
- Khadim Hussain Raja, Pakistan Army officer
