= Khaleel Chishty =

Pakistani citizen

Dr Khaleel Chishty was a Pakistani citizen who was convicted and sentenced to life imprisonment in January 2011 for killing a man after a fight in the Indian town of Ajmer in 1992. The trial lasted 18 years, during which he was kept under house arrest in his ancestral home in Ajmer.

In April 2012, during a meeting, Pakistan's President Asif Ali Zardari discussed Dr. Chishty's release with Indian Prime Manmohan Singh. In May 2012, the Supreme Court of India granted him bail on humanitarian grounds, allowing him to visit his home in Karachi, Pakistan. He was required to return for his next court hearing on 20 November 2012. Upon his return to India, the Indian Supreme Court freed him by dropping the murder charges against him.

== Background ==
Chishty was a Professor of virology in Karachi Medical College and also held a PhD from the University of Edinburgh.

== Arrest and prosecution ==
In 1992, Chishty visited Ajmer to see his ailing mother. He was involved in a family feud which resulted in a man being murdered in the same year. He was arrested and charged with the murder though he protested his innocence all along. During the lengthy trial he remained under house arrest at his ancestral home in Ajmer.

In January 2011 he was finally convicted and sentenced to life imprisonment in Ajmer jail. The trial lasted an unusual 18 long years.

== Clemency appeals ==
On 17 June 2011, Justice Markandey Katju made a personal appeal to Prime Minister Manmohan Singh to release Chishty on humanitarian grounds. BJP, the main Indian opposition party expressed its dismay at a judge writing to the Prime Minister for securing the release of a Pakistani prisoner in his individual capacity.

In April 2012, Pakistan President Zardari appealed to Indian Prime Minister Singh to release him on humanitarian grounds and allow him to return to Pakistan.

=== Reference to the Sarabjit Singh case ===
In November 2012 ex-justice Katju wrote to the President and Prime Minister of Pakistan requesting clemency for Sarabjit Singh on similar grounds. Sarabjit Singh is an Indian citizen who has also spent the last 22 years in Pakistani jail under conviction of terrorism. His family and supporters have maintained Sarabjit's innocence and claim that the arrest was on the grounds of mistaken identity.

== Release on bail ==
At the intervention of the Indian Prime Minister Dr Singh, the Indian supreme court granted Chishty bail on humanitarian grounds in April 2012. He was subsequently also allowed to visit Pakistan until 1 November 2012 on a security deposit of 500,000 Indian Rupees.

== Release ==
On his return from bail in Pakistan, Dr. Chishty was freed by the Indian Supreme Court in December 2012 and allowed to return to Pakistan.
