= Samir El-Khadem =

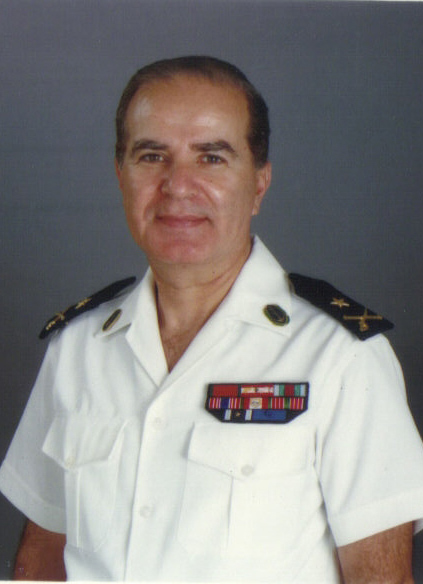
Samir El-Khadem

Samir El-Khadem (Arabic: سمير الخادم; born September 25, 1942, in Tripoli, Lebanon) is the former Commander of the Lebanese Naval Forces, and an author, historian, and currently the director of the Institute for East and West Studies in Beirut, Lebanon. El-Khadem retired from the Lebanese Army on September 25, 2000, reaching the rank of Rear Admiral after serving for 39 years. As of 2007, he is the President of the Numismatic Society for the Arab and Muslim World.

== Background ==
El-Khadem was born in a small Muslim Sunni family in the sea port city of Tripoli. He finished his secondary education at Lycee of Tripoli in 1962 and was enrolled in the Military Academy as a cadet officer. Two years later, he was selected to embark on a one-year training course on board of the Jeanne d’Arc, French Porte Helicoptere. El-Khadem married Nahida Koleilat and they have three children: Rajai, Arige, and Raed.

== Military career ==
El-Khadem joined the Lebanese Military Academy in 1962 as a young cadet (ranking 2nd place in admission exams), and soon afterwards was selected to complete his training in France where he graduated from the Naval Academy of Brest in 1964 as a Naval Lieutenant and Engineer.

During his military service, he assumed critical positions, notably, at the time of Lebanese Civil War. He was appointed during the tragic events striking Lebanon in the years 1975-76, as a liaison officer to control and supervise operations of the Lebanese Army liaison office located at the Museum area in Beirut.

In 1977, and during President Elias Sarkis term, he was appointed at the Lebanese Intelligence Directorate to assume the post of Military Attachés Bureau Chief and also was assigned to head the strategic section at the Intelligence Directorate until 1982.

In 1982, he was delegated by Army Command to follow Advanced Naval Command and Staff Studies in France for two years. Upon his return to Lebanon, he was appointed Deputy Commander of Naval Forces, Chief of Joint Naval Operations Center, and Instructor at the Command and Staff faculty, in the domains of intelligence, naval support, and supervision of officers’ research theses.

On November 26, 1996, he was appointed as the 10th Commander of Lebanese Naval Forces. El-Khadem left the Navy Commandment on February 26, 1999, and was appointed at the Army Headquarters as director of the Council of Strategic and Military Studies.

== Education ==
In 1980, he earned a master's degree in history from the Lebanese University. In June 1988, he received his Ph.D. degree in history from the Lebanese University; its major topic revolved around “Commercial, Diplomatic and Human Relations Between Italian Cities and the Eastern Mediterranean Region” which was published in 1989.

== Military achievements ==
El-Khadem throughout his military career has been awarded numerous medals and honors for his service. He received more than 15 citations from the Ministry of Defense and Army Headquarters for courage, duty performance, proficiency, and search and rescue. Among them are:

- Order of Cedars: third degree, second degree, and first degree
- Order of Merit: Great Commodore
- Ordre de Mérite National Français Grade Officier
- Medal of Sacrifice and Devotion (December 31, 1961)
- Medal of the Navy
- Medal of the Dawn of the South
- Medal of Military high performance
- Medal of Liberation

== Published works ==
- Numismatics and Monetary Reform In Early Islam The Dawn of Islamic Numismatics, Beirut, first edition, February 2010, second edition, August 2010
- The War of Surprises and Deceptions, Beirut 2006 Beirut, first edition 2007, second edition 2008
- The New and Revised Dictionary for Diplomatic Terms, Beirut, 1996
- In the Footsteps of Jesus, The Messiah, In Phoenicia/Lebanon - Written by: Professor M. P. Roncaglia, Foreword by: Rear Admiral Samir El-Khadem, Ph.D.
- While Christopher Columbus Was Heading West, What was Happening in the East?, Beirut, 1992
- Islamic East and The Christian West, Beirut, 1991
- Opinions of the Inhabitants of Beirut Virtuous City, Beirut, 1991
- Firearm and Its Influence on The Orient 15-16 Centuries, Beirut, 1978

== References & Media coverage ==
- Numismatics Society of the Arab and Islamic World
- Lebanon Files
- The Maritime Security Cooperation Conference
- Radio France Internationale
- Institute for Near East & Gulf Military Analysis
- Al-Ahram Weekly
- Aristocratic Coin Analysis & Testimony
- Gold Bulletin
- Coin News

TV interviews:

- Dinar of the standing caliph, Abdul Malik bin Marwan al-Umawi - Part 1 on YouTube
- Dinar of the standing caliph, Abdul Malik bin Marwan al-Umawi - Part 2 on YouTube
