= Langar (Sufism) =

Charitable religious practice

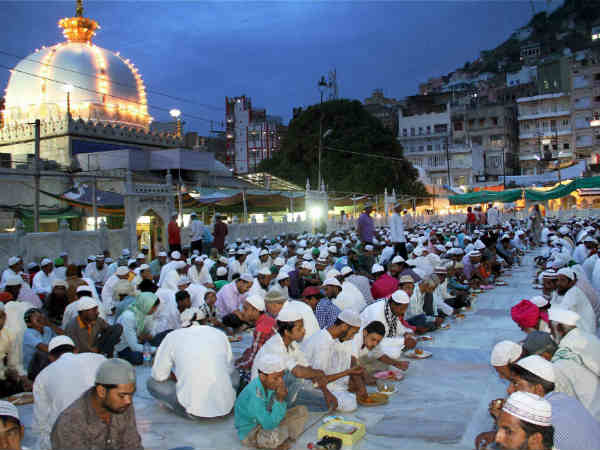
Langar at shrine of Sufi, Khawaja Moinuddin Chishti

Langar (Persian: لنگر, Punjabi: لنگر) is an institution among Sufi Muslims in South Asia whereby food and drink are given to the needy regardless of social or religious background. Its origins in Sufism are tied to the Chishti Order.

== Etymology ==
Langar (لنگر) is originally a Persian word meaning "anchor" or "a place for resting." The term was later adopted into Punjabi, in which it was used by the founder of the Langar practice and institution, and eventually entered other South Asian languages.

== History ==
The institution and practice of langar were first initiated by Baba Farid, a Punjabi Muslim saint of the Chishti Order, a prominent Sufi tradition. By the 12th and 13th centuries, the concept of langar had become common among Sufi communities across the Indian subcontinent. It is referenced in historical texts such as the Jawahir al-Faridi, compiled in 1623 CE.

The practice of langar — offering free food to all visitors regardless of background — was later adopted by the Sikhs, who institutionalized it further as a central part of their religious and social practice.

Traditionally, food was (and still is) prepared in a large cauldron known as a deg and served within the precincts of a dargah (Sufi shrine).

=== Religious meaning ===
Serving food to the needy has been a rich tradition among Sufis, especially of the Chishti Order.

There is extensive use of free food imagery and metaphor in Sufi writings. Sugar and other sweet foods represent the sweetness of piety and community with God, while salt symbolizes purity and incorruptibility. The transformation of the raw wheat to finished bread is used as an analogy for Sufi spiritual development.

Sufi ritual observances (dhikr) are concerned with remembrance of God through exaltation and praise. Singing, dancing, and drumming are commonly part of such rituals, as is sharing of food. The tradition of langar was also adopted by the Sikh community, where it goes by the same name.

== Langar khana ==
Langar is distributed to all in a langar khana (lit. 'Alms-house'). In a large dargah there are two degs (cauldrons for cooking food) on either side of the saham chiragh (courtyard lamp) fixed into solid masonry in which a palatable mixture of rice, sugar, ghee (butter) and dried fruits is cooked for distribution to the public as tabarruk. The circumference at the edge of the larger cauldron is 3.1 metres (10 1/4 ft). It cooks 70 mounds of rice, while the smaller deg takes 28 mounds. In the dergah at Ajmer, one of them was presented by Emperor Akbar in 1567 CE. The princes or the well-to-do pilgrims order these degs to be cooked generally during the Urs period.

=== The langar khana at Ajmer ===
Bari Deg: Inside the Sahan-e-Chiragh and on the right side of Buland Darwaza is located Bari Deg. Emperor Akbar pledged to visit Ajmer Sharif on foot and presented a large cauldron if victorious in Chittaurgarh battle. So he kept his words after winning the battle. The circumference of the cauldron (Deg) is 11.4 metres (12 1/2 yd) and 125 mounds of rice can be cooked in it at a time. It was presented in 976 AH (1568/1569 CE).

Chhoti Deg: It is located on the left side of Buland Darwaza inside Sahan-e-Chiragh. It was presented by Sultan Nooruddin Jahangir in 1013 AH (1604/1605 CE). Eighty mounds of rice can be cooked in it at a time.
