= Dainik Navajyoti =

Indian newspaper

- Type: Daily newspaper
- Format: Broadsheet
- Owner(s): Navajyoti Printing Press Pvt. Ltd.
- Founded: 1936
- Political alignment: Liberal
- Language: Hindi
- Headquarters: Ajmer
- Circulation: 8 Lakh+
- Website: www.dainiknavajyoti.com
- Free online archives: epaper.dainiknavajyoti.com

Dainik Navajyoti (Hindi: दैनिक नवज्योति, romanized: Dainik Navajyoti, lit. 'The Daily New Light') is a Hindi language daily newspaper published in Rajasthan from Jaipur, Jodhpur, Ajmer, Udaipur & Kota. It was founded in 1936 by freedom fighter Captain Durgaprasad Chaudhary.

== Editions ==
Dainik Navajyoti is printed from the following places:

- Ajmer
- Jaipur
- Jodhpur
- Kota, Rajasthan
- Nagaur
- Udaipur
- Gangapur City
