= Shrine of Mu'in al-Din Chishti =

Sufi tomb of Moinuddin Chishti at Ajmer

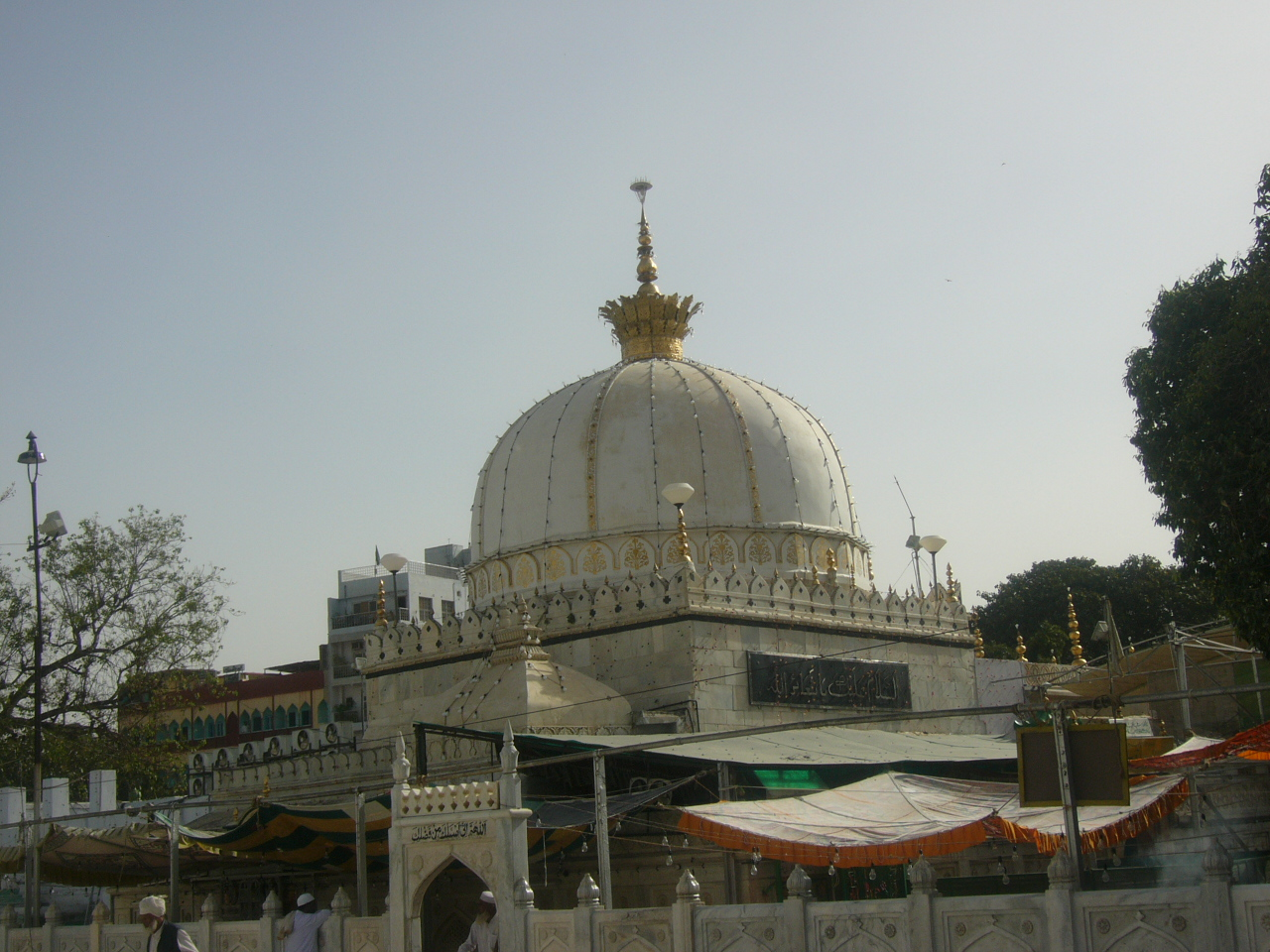
- The tomb of Moinuddin Chishti

- Location of the dargah complex in Rajasthan

Religion
- Affiliation: Sunni Islam
- Sect: Sufism
- Festivals: Urs festival, Ajmer (Rajab)
- Ecclesiastical or organisational status: Sufi mausoleum and mosque
- Ownership: Government of Rajasthan

Location
- Location: Ajmer, Ajmer district, Rajasthan
- Country: India
- Administration: Dargah Committee, Ajmer
- Coordinates: 26°27′22″N 74°37′41″E

Architecture
- Type: Mosque architecture
- Style: Indo-Islamic
- Completed: 1236 CE

Specifications
- Direction of façade: West
- Dome: One
- Minaret: One
- Shrines: One (Chishti); 8 additional tombs

Website
- ajmerdargahsharif.com

The Shrine of Mu'in al-Din Chishti, also known as the Ajmer Dargah Shareef, is a Sufi dargah complex incorporating the shrine of Mu'in al-Din Chishti, several tombs, and a mosque, located at Ajmer, in the state of Rajasthan, India. The shrine is significant and it is one of the most popular sites of religious visitation for Sunni Muslims in the Indian subcontinent that can attract up to 20,000 pilgrims per day, swelling to hundred of thousands on Chishti's urs.

== Background ==
Mu'in al-Din Chishti was a 13th-century Sufi saint and philosopher. Born in Sanjar (of modern-day Iran), or in Sistan, he arrived in Delhi during the reign of the Sultan Iltutmish (d. 1236). Mu'in al-Din moved from Delhi to Ajmer shortly thereafter, at which point he became increasingly influenced by the writings of the famous Sunni Hanbali scholar and mystic ʿAbdallāh Anṣārī (d. 1088), whose famous work on the lives of the early Islamic saints, the Ṭabāqāt al-ṣūfiyya, may have played a role in shaping Mu'in al-Din's worldview. It was during his time in Ajmer that Mu'in al-Din acquired the reputation of being a charismatic and compassionate spiritual preacher and teacher; biographical accounts of his life written after his death report that he received the gifts of many "spiritual marvels (karāmāt), such as miraculous travel, clairvoyance, and visions of angels" in these years of his life.

== History ==
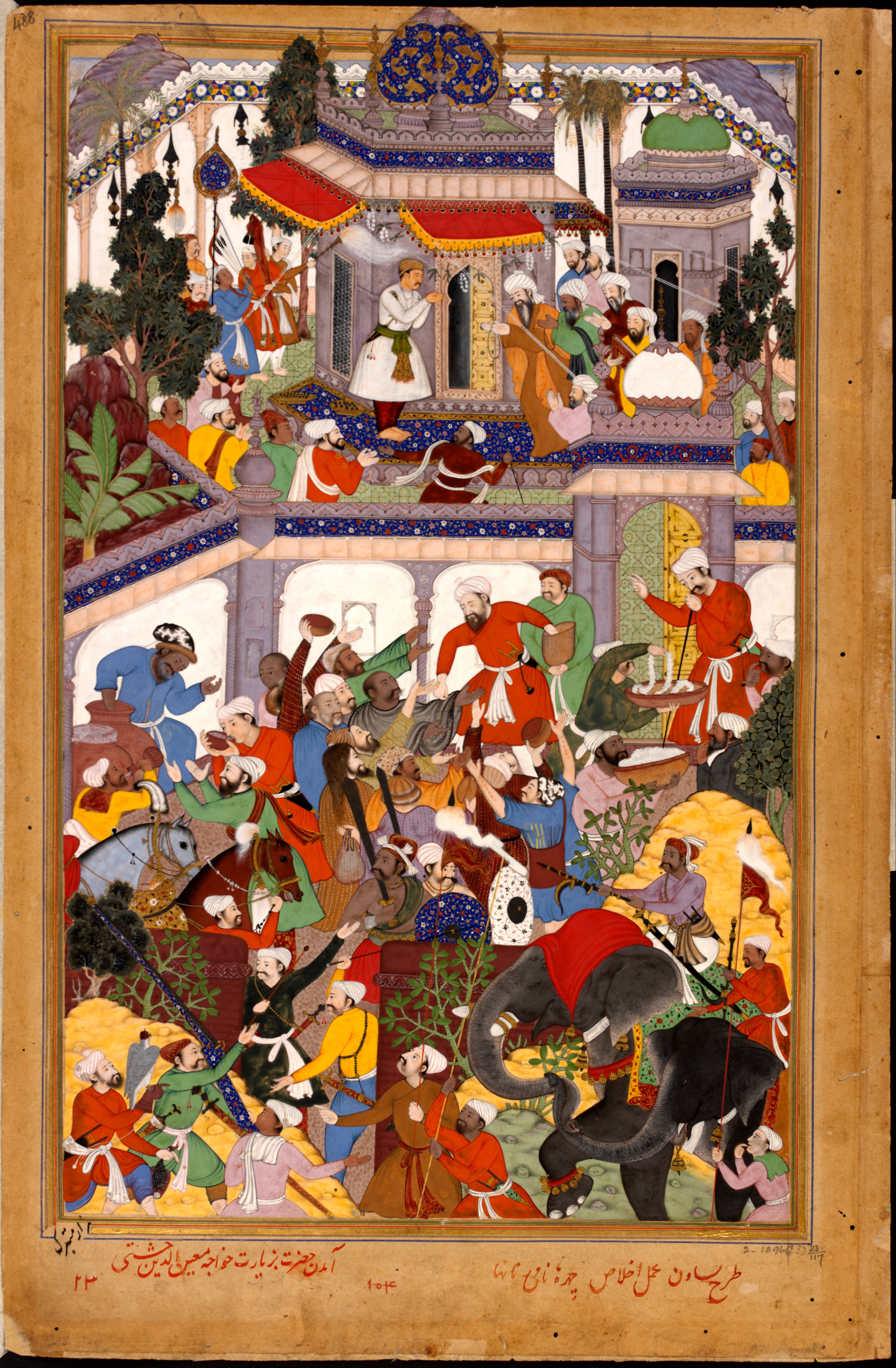
Akbar visiting the tomb of Khwajah Mu'in ad-Din Chishti at Ajmer - 16th century painting by Basawan

Mu'in al-Din seems to have been unanimously regarded as a great saint after his passing. The tomb (dargāh) of Mu'in al-Din became a deeply venerated site in the century following the preacher's death in March 1236. Honoured by members of all social classes, the tomb was treated with great respect by the era's most important Sunni rulers. The 13th-century Sultan of Delhi Iltutmish paid a famous visit to the tomb in 1232 to commemorate the memory of the saint. In a similar way, the later Mughal Emperor Akbar (d. 1605) visited the shrine no less than fourteen times during his reign. He also made a pilgrimage to this tomb in 1566, with his Hindu consort, Mariam-uz-Zamani barefoot in the hopes of having sons born to them. He also reconstructed the tomb's sanctum sanctorum in 1579. Jahangir, Shah Jahan, and Jahanara later renovated the structure. Kumar Rao Scindia added residences as he believed the khwaja had blessed him with a son. Structures were also built by Maharani Baiza Bai Scindia in the 18th century and Ajit Singh of Jodhpur in 1709. An elegant covering over the dargah was constructed in 1800 by the Maharaja of Baroda.

Local and national rulers came to pray here, the dargah grew in popularity and size over the years. Razia Sultana, Nasiruddin Mahmud, Muhammad bin Tughluq, Sher Shah Suri, and Akbar, Mariam-uz-Zamani and his descendants Jahangir, Shah Jahan, Aurangzeb, Dara Shikoh and Jahanara Begum were known to have visited the shrine.

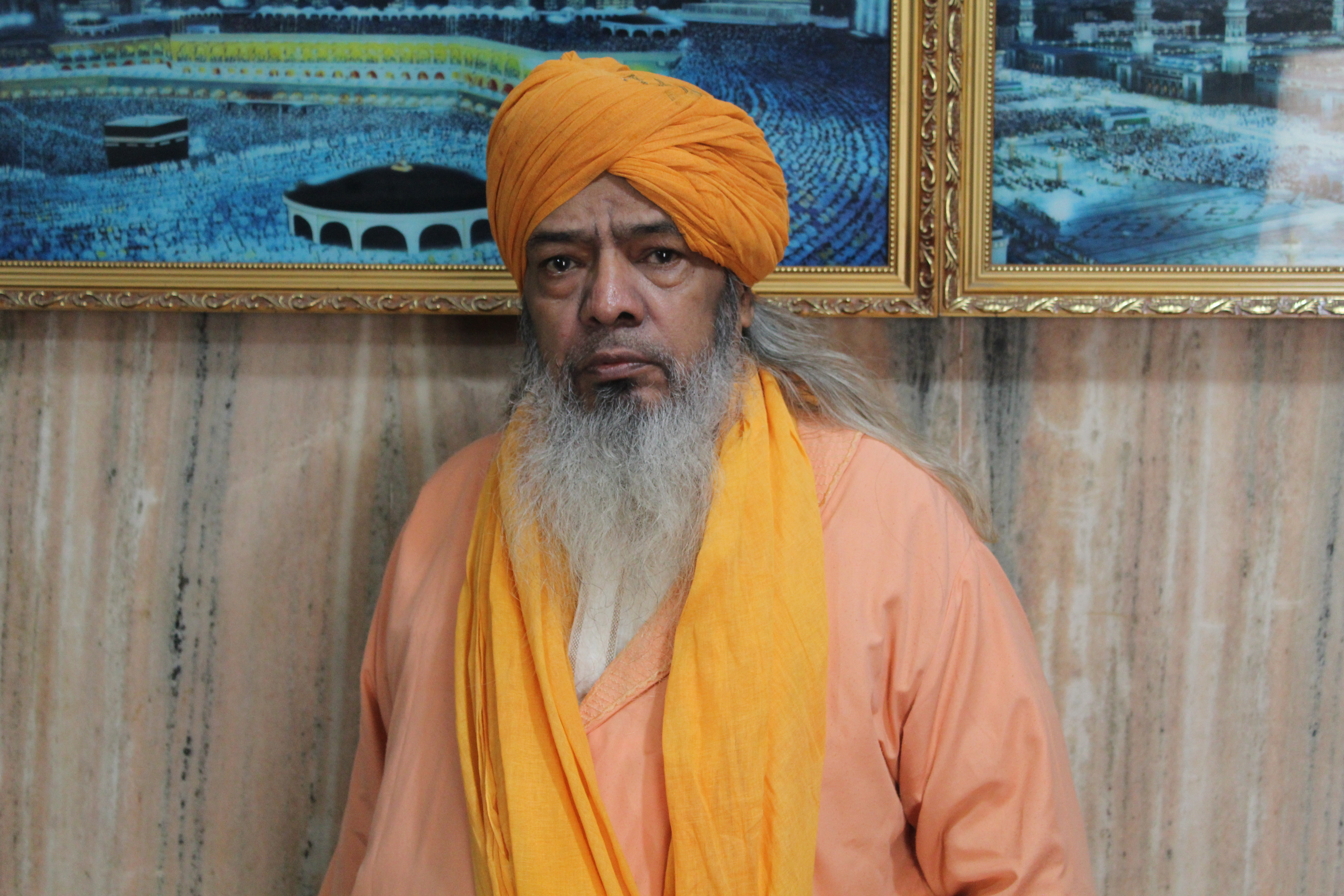
Head priest of the shrine, Dewan Syed Zainul Abedin Chisti Ajmeri

In the present day, the tomb of Mu'in al-Din Chishti continues to be one of the most popular sites of religious visitation for Sunni Muslims in the Indian subcontinent, with over "hundreds of thousands of people from all over the Indian sub-continent assembling there on the occasion of [the saint's] ʿurs or death anniversary."

Additionally, the site attracts many Hindus, who have also venerated the Islamic saint since the medieval period. That said, some Hindu nationalists subscribing to the Hindutva ideology recent years have challenged the site's Islamic identity. In 2024, the Hindu Sena organisation initiated a legal proceeding against the site, arguing that it was built over a Siva temple.

In 2019, the Hindustan Zinc Limited decided to renovate the complex under the Swachh Bharat Abhiyan, including many plans specifically targeted at sanitation and hygiene.

== Architecture ==
The white marble dome of Chishti's shrine, as seen today, was built in 1532. This date is inscribed in golden letters on the Northern wall of the dargah. It is an example of Indo-Islamic architecture and the dome features a lotus and a crown of gold, donated by Rampur's Nawab Haider Ali Khan. It is located in the Ihaata Noorani (transl. Quarter of Light) of the complex. Materials used to build it include marble, brick and sandstone. The dargah has a royal darbar, Mehfil Khana, that was constructed in 1888. It is a square structure and has a patterned ceiling. Jahanara Begum donated the dargah's left facet (Begumi Dalaan), the railing around the dargah and also constructed a small platform, the Begumi Chabutra. The sanctum of the dargah has two doors. The canopy made of mother-of-pearl and silver was commissioned by Jahangir and is visible from the cenotaph's four silver posts. The ceiling is etched with gold and in 1888, the walls were gilded.

The complex has multiple structures and has eight entrance gates. However, only three of these are in use. The Nizam Gate, a yellow structure with floral designs, is the main gate and was donated by the 7th Nizam of Hyderabad Mir Osman Ali Khan in 1911. An older gate, the Shahjahani Gate, was donated by the Mughal emperor Shah Jahan. It marked the expansion of the shrine complex beyond the Buland Darwaza, (Note: This "high gate" or "buland darwaza" should not be confused with Akbar's more famous Buland Darwaza in Fatehpur Sikri.) built by Sultan Mahmud Khalji. (Note: Sultan Mahmood Khilji II (Shihab-ud-Din Mahmud Shah II) ruled Malwa from 1510 to 1531.) Other gates include the Madar Gate and the Delhi Gate. The Jannati Darwaza is a door made of silver that is used only on rare occasions. It is also referred to as the Bihisti Darwaza.

The complex has eight tombs besides that of Chishti, belonging to members of his family. Some of these include Chishti's daughter Bibi Hafiza Jamal and Nizam Sikka, who was a water-carrier who saved Humayun's life. A huge chandelier, Sahn Chirag, was commissioned by Akbar. The Ahaat-e-Noor is a large courtyard where religious functions are held and qawwalis are sung. Near the Nizam Gate is the Naqqar Khana (transl. drum house) where music was once played from to greet visitors. A large silver chandelier was donated by the Golden Temple. The Akbari Mosque is made of red sandstone and was probably commissioned by Akbar. A more elegant mosque was commissioned by Shah Jahan in 1637 and is called the Jami Masjid. It is made of white marble. The Sandali Masjid was constructed by Aurangzeb. The complex also has a Langar Khana and a Mahfil Khana (assembly hall for qawwals, opened only during the urs). The Jhalara is a natural tank of water that is used by pilgrims. Other tanks were donated by Shah Jahan and Queen Mary in 1911.

The Jami Masjid, or Friday mosque, is located to the west of the dargah, while the large marble courtyard is located on its eastern side. The Arhat-i-Noor is an enclosure restricted to women that is located on the southern side and houses the tombs of Chishti's daughter and granddaughter. More than 40 graves lie behind the Jami Masjid.

In 1568, Akbar donated a deeg (cauldron) to the dargah since he made a wish to donate it after winning the battle of Chittorgarh. The deeg was made of an alloy of seven metals, one of which was brought from Colombo, Sri Lanka. The diameter of the deeg is 6.1 metres (20 ft). The rim of the deeg was made in such a way that it never gets hot even while the bottom of the deeg is ignited and the food is being cooked. The deeg was brought on elephants as three separate parts and the three parts were reassembled there. This deeg is the biggest deeg in the world. Akbar prepared the first dish in this deeg, tasted it and shared it with other fakirs near the dargah. The smaller deeg was donated by Jahangir as a part of family tradition.

== Culture ==
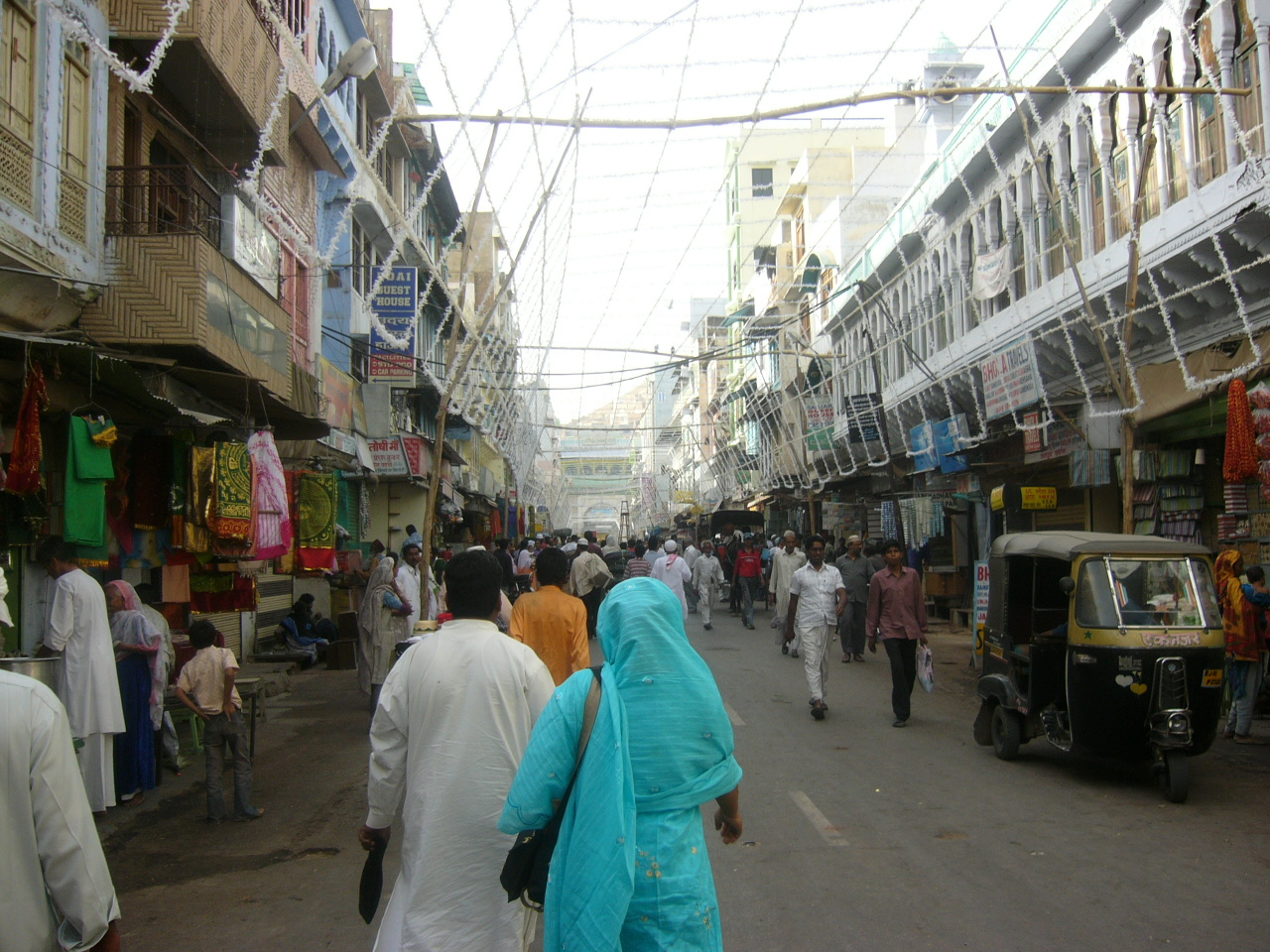
The street approaching the dargah

The dargah has been a site for pilgrims venerated by followers of Hinduism and Islam since medieval times. Pilgrims come here from around the world and offer chaddars (sacred sheets) to the shrine. Pilgrims also offer rose petals, which total up to seven tonnes per day. Women are allowed to enter the dargah. It has been estimated that around 20,000 pilgrims visit the site every day. After pilgrims exit the shrine, photographers from photo studios offer professional photos of the pilgrims at rates from ₹20. Most of these photographers are Hindus who migrated to Ajmer during the Partition of India.

For the langar of the shrine, Akbar and Jahangir donated degh (transl. cauldron) in 1568 and 1614, respectively. These two degh are in use even today, as the dargah is known for its degh ka khana (transl. food from a cauldron). This is made of rice, ghee, cashew nuts, almonds and raisins.

Sharif Dargah ritual purification at the ablution pool, Ajmer

People undergo the Islamic ritual purification of wudu, in which pilgrims wash their face, hands and feet prior to offering namaz.

The street approaching the dargah is well-known for its food, craft items and gota work.

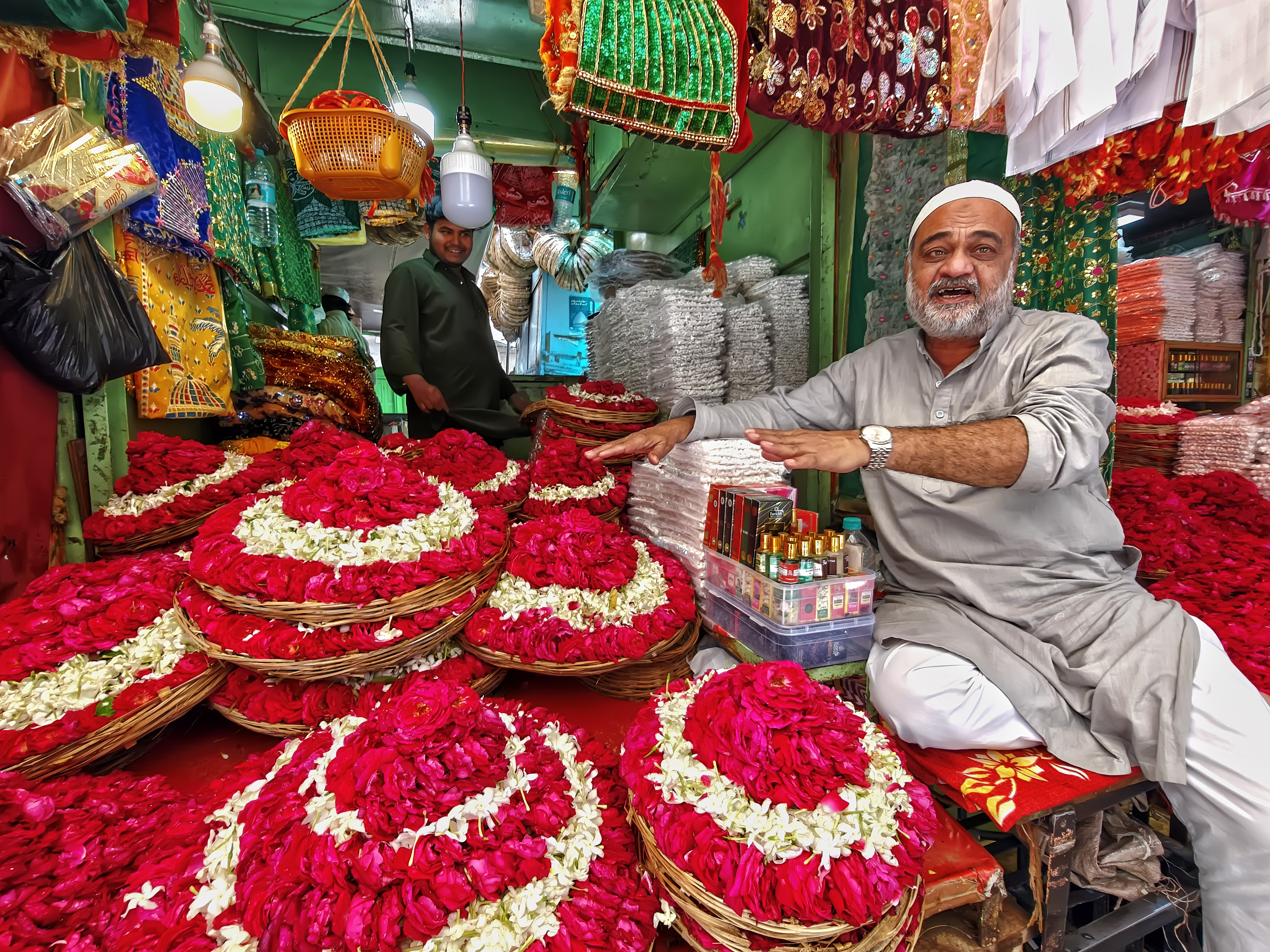
Shopkeepers selling flower petals and other religious offerings outside the Ajmer Sharif Dargah in Rajasthan. Ajmer Sharif Dargah

The daily rituals at the dargah are mainly the five mandatory prayers of Muslims, the namaz. At sunset, there is the ceremony of the Dua-e-Roshni (transl. Prayer of Lights), in which large yellow candles are carried to the darbar by the khadims. Following the prayers at night, qawwalis are sung, after which all visitors are asked to leave. Three khadims then clean the durbar with brooms made of peacock feathers. After the last person is out of the shrine, the qawwals recite the Karka, which is a musical verse in Sanskrit, Brij and Persian. The dargah is then locked and reopened only for the next day's pre-dawn prayer.

Some attribute the influence of Islam on Indian culture to have begun from the dargah, including in Tansen's music; the tolerance practiced by Salim Chishti, Abul Fazl and Abul Faizi; and in Indo-Saracenic architecture. It has been the tradition to source the incense, sandalwood paste and ittar used in the dargah from a Brahmin family, right from the times of Chishti. One shrine in the dargah complex is revered by Sikhs.

=== Urs Sharif festival ===
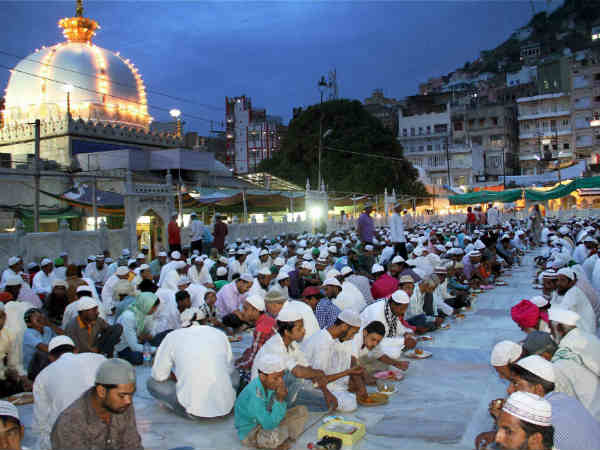
Langar at the shrine

The death anniversary of Mu'in al-Din Chishti, the urs, is not mourned and is celebrated since according to Islamic belief, and especially in the philosophy of the Sufi Chishti Order, it is the very day the disciple is reunited with his maker (Allah). The celebrations begin with the end of the Islamic month of Jumada al-Thani and conclude on the sixth day of the month of Rajab, a total of six days. Members of Bhilwara's Gori family march through the city towards the Nizam gate and hoist the flag on the Buland Darwaza, marking the beginning of the festival. Following this, the urs rituals begin with the sighting of the moon. This is followed by the Aser ki Namaz. Every night a mehfil-i-sama takes place at the Mahfil Khana of the complex, in which women are allowed to participate (which is not common in a dargah). The urs end with the Qul, the final prayer. During this period, pilgrims attempt to enter the dargah as many times as possible and make their prayers. The Bihisti Darwaza(made of silver) is washed with rose water by pilgrims in the afternoon. It is believed that roses offered to the dargah during the festival are sourced from Pushkar.

About five lakh people, the approximate population of the city of Ajmer, come to attend the urs. About 2,700 buses of pilgrims enter the city. Indian Railways launches a special train service, the Garib Nawaz trains, to facilitate transport for pilgrims around the country. Vishram Sthali in the Kayad locality of Ajmer serves as a place for lakhs of pilgrims to stay during this time, although every kind of accommodation is occupied with the sheer number of pilgrims. In March 2020, it was announced that a large guest house, Rubath, would be constructed in Ajmer for the same.

In January 2026, India's Supreme Court rejected a petition that sought to end the state's official involvement in the urs and recognition of the shrine. The court decision cited government involvement in the festival as a time-honoured tradition since the country's independence in 1947, including successive prime ministers offering a chadar.

== Major events ==
=== Chadar offerings ===
- Various public figures send 'chadar' during the Urs.
- A red and green 'chadar' offered by the United States Embassy on behalf of US President Barack Obama and the people of the country was presented at the Ajmer Sharif Dargah on the occasion of the 803rd Urs with a message of 'deepest friendship' and 'peace'.
- Delhi Chief Minister Arvind Kejriwal sent a 'chadar' offered at the dargah of Khwaja Mu'in al-Din Chishti in Ajmer on the occasion of the Sufi saint's 809th Urs on Wednesday and prayed for the end of COVID-19.
- Congress leader Rahul Gandhi met a delegation of the Congress Minority Department in the presence of its National Chairman Imran Pratapgarhi and others and sent a chadar for the 810th Urs of Ajmer Sharif Dargah.
- Chadar by Afghan President Ashraf Ghani for Ajmer Sharif arrived from Kabul and was offered at the Dargah in 2021.
- In 2015, Prime Minister Narendra Modi handed over a 'chadar' offered at the Ajmer Sharif dargah, in a meeting with Muslim clerics on 808th Urs of Mu'in al-Din Chisty.

== Reception ==
=== Sexual grooming scandal ===
The 1992 Ajmer rape scandal was a series of gangrapes and blackmailing in which 250 female students, aged between 11 and 20, were victims of a series of gang rapes and blackmailing. The perpetrators, led by Farooq and Nafees Chishti, were members of the hereditary caretaker Khadim family of Ajmer Sharif Dargah and leaders of the Indian Youth Congress in Ajmer. Over several years, ending in 1992, they lured victims to remote farmhouses or bungalows, where they were sexually assaulted by one or several of the men and photographed naked or otherwise revealing positions to prevent the women from speaking out. The scandal came to light through a local newspaper, Dainik Navajyoti, and subsequent police investigations, amid allegations of prior knowledge by local authorities.

=== 2007 bombing ===
On 11 October 2007, an explosion occurred in Dargah Khwaja Mu'in al-Din Chishti's courtyard in Ajmer in Rajasthan. It was the holy fasting period of Ramazan and evening prayers had just ended. A crowd had gathered at the courtyard to break their fast. A bomb was placed inside a tiffin carrier went off. Reports said the blast claimed 7 lives and injured 17.

Special Judge Dinesh Gupta's nearly 500-page judgment was based on testimonies of 149 witnesses and 451 document submitted to his court.

On 22 March 2017, the National Investigation Agency (NIA) Special Court, sentenced two murderers named Bhavesh Patel and Davendra Gupta to life imprisonment, who were convicted along with Sunil Joshi, all of them ex-pracharaks of Rashtriya Swayamsevak Sangh. Those convicted were held guilty under the Unlawful Activities Prevention Act, Explosives Act and various sections of Indian Penal Code.

=== Legal challenges by Hindu organisations ===
In recent years, Hindu nationalist groups subscribing to the Hindutva ideology have challenged the site's Islamic identity.

On 27 November 2024, the Ajmer Civil Court issued notices to the Archaeological Survey of India (ASI) and other authorities in response to a petition, filed by Hindu Sena, that claimed the site to have been built over a Shiva temple and prayed for a survey by ASI. The petition was based on the 1911 book Ajmer: Historical and Descriptive, by Har Bilas Sarda which narrates the tradition says that inside the cellar, priest prayer (Puja) of Mahadeva in a temple. The Dargah Committee has rejected the claims, calling them divisive and harmful to communal harmony.

The Ajmer Civil Court accepted a separate petition in January 2026 filed by the Hindutva group Maharana Pratap Sena, which also maintained that a Shiva temple had been on the site of the Sufi shrine. In May 2026, the civil court held a hearing examining the petition, to which Hindu Sena had been added as a petitioner. Reports described as including "intense arguments" by both supporters and opponents of the petition.

== In popular culture ==
The 1973 Indian film Mere Gharib Nawaz, directed by G. Ishwar, centres around a family who overcomes adversities through their piety at the shrine of Mu'in al-Din Chishti in Ajmer. Other Indian films revolving around the dargah and the saint include Sultan E Hind (1973) by K. Sharif, Mere Data Garib Nawaz (1994) by M Gulzar Sultani.

== Location ==
The Ajmer Sharif Dargah is 2 kilometres (1.2 mi) from the main central Ajmer Railway station and 500 metres (1,600 ft) from the Central Jail and is situated at the foot of the Taragarh hill.

== Gallery ==
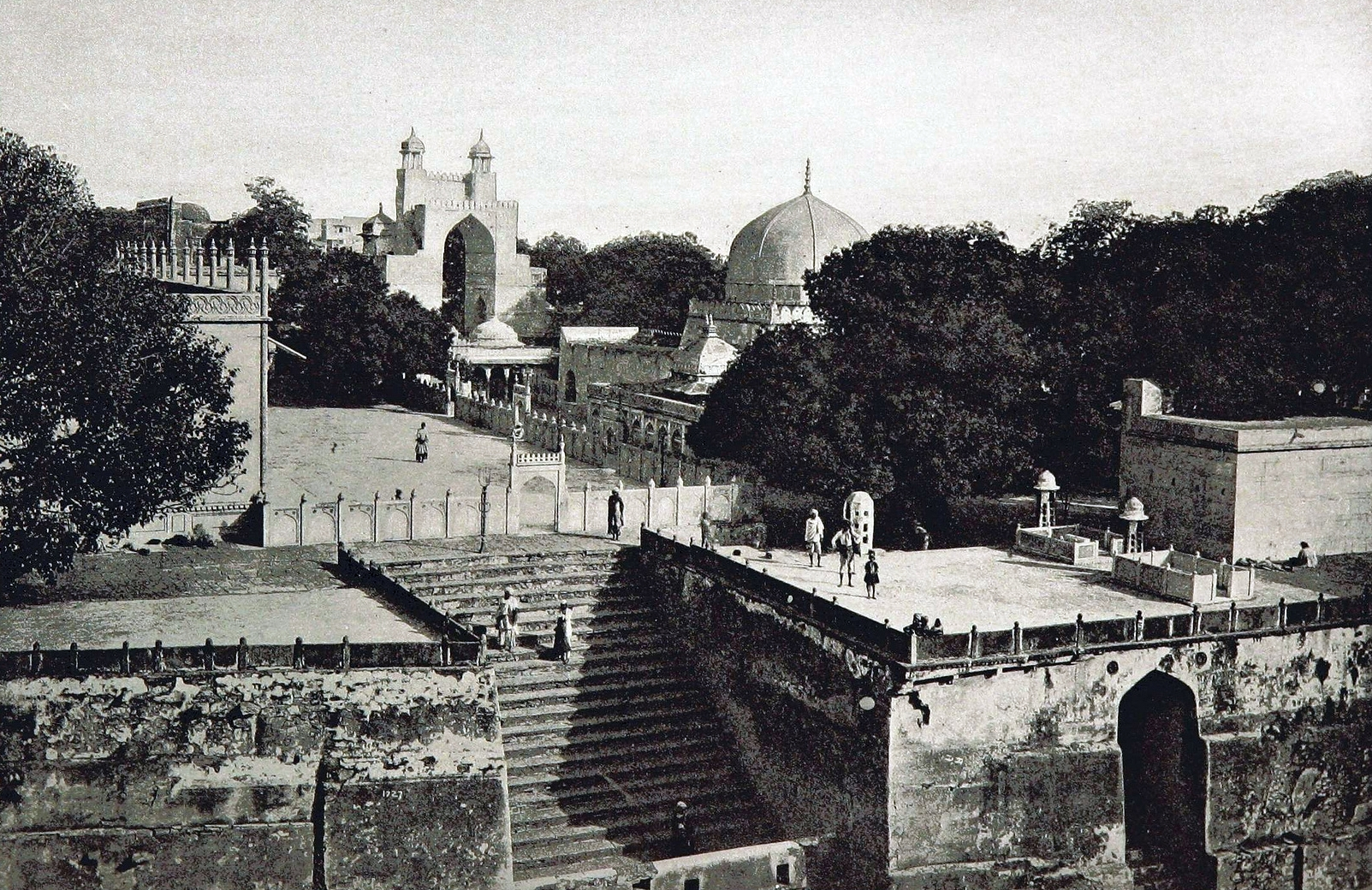
Dargah Sharif, Ajmer, 1893

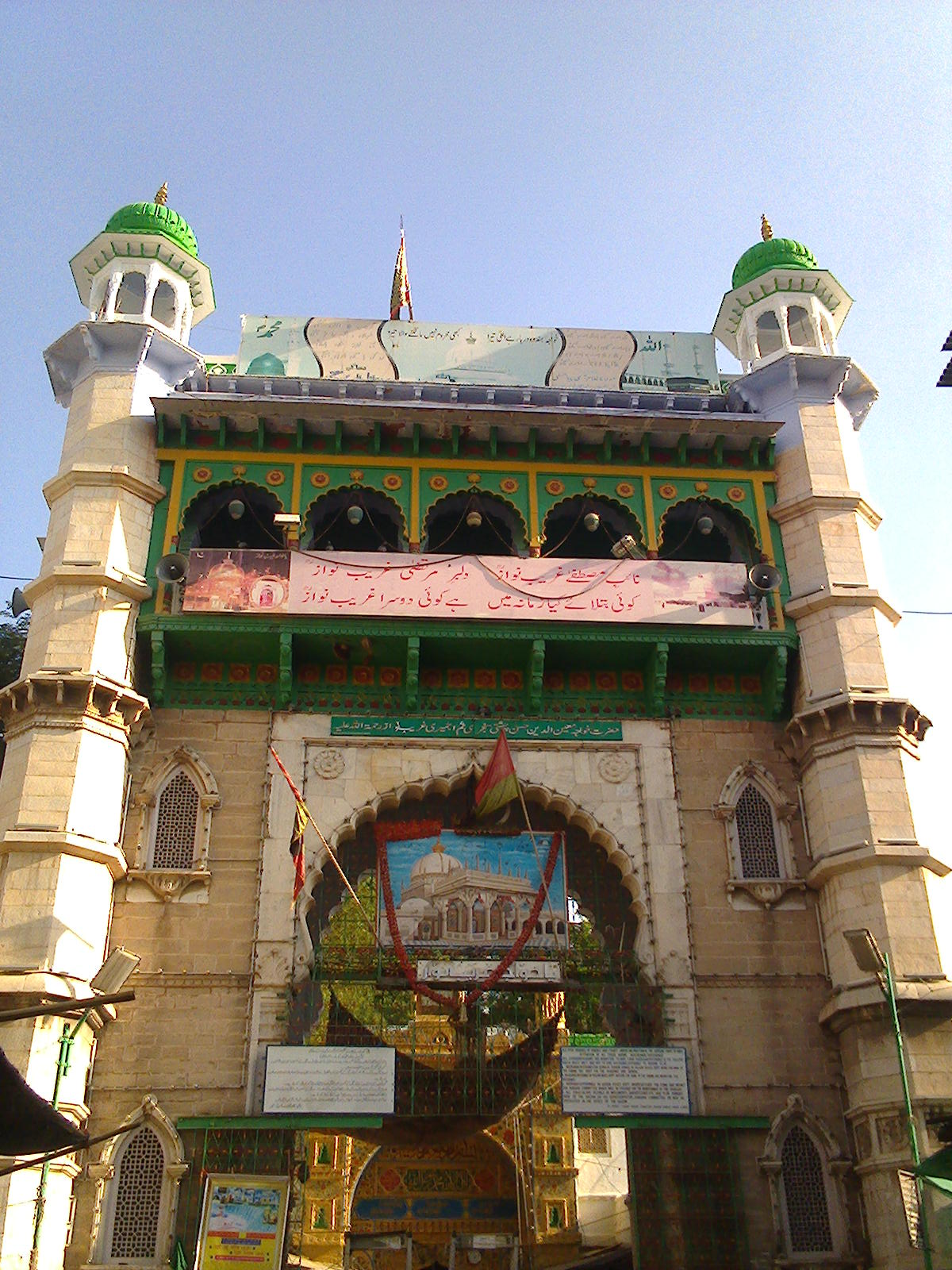
Buland Darwaza, erected by Sultan Mahmood Khilji

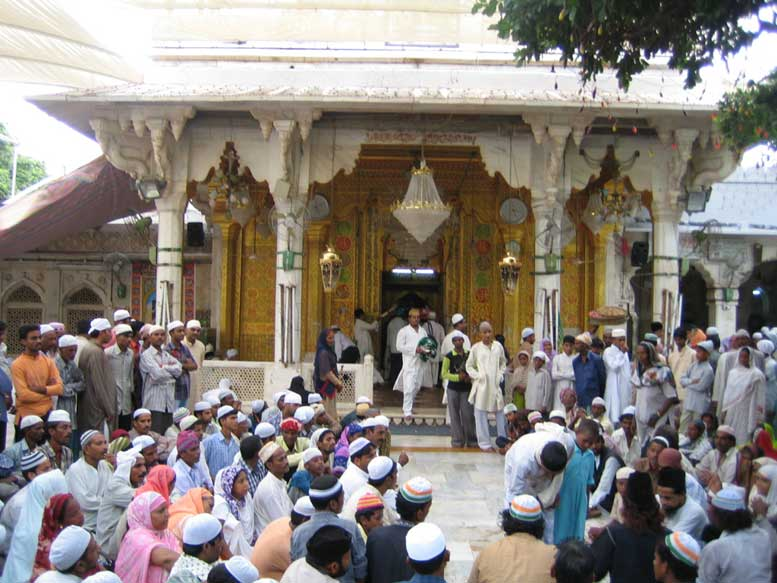
Mausoleum of Mu'in al-Din Chishti

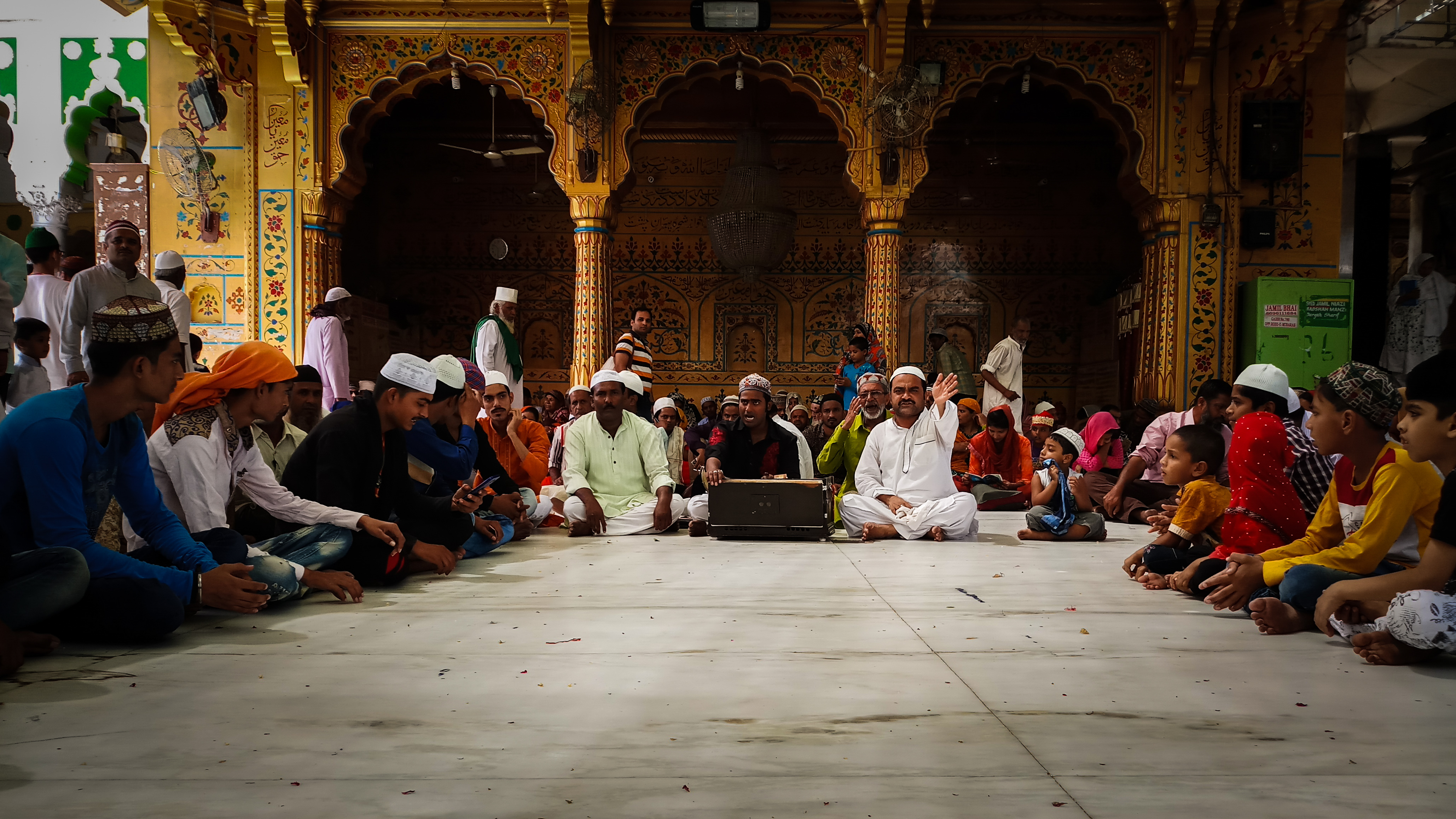
Qawali at the front of Dargah

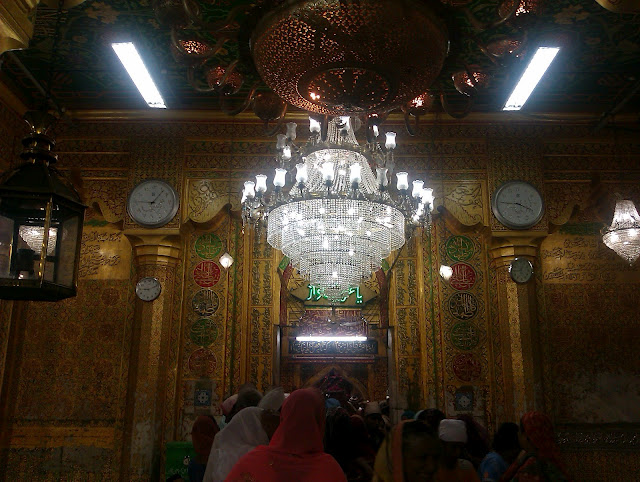
Inside the mausoleum

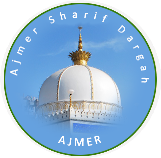
Dargah Emblem

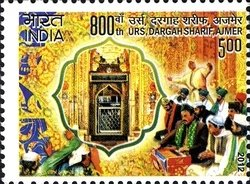
Indian Postage Stamp commemorating 800th Urs

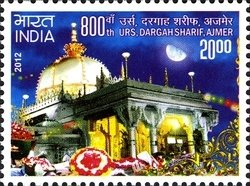

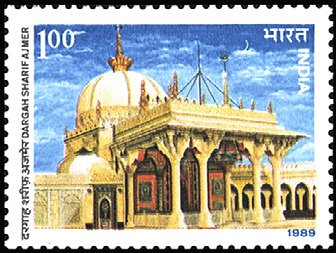
1989

== See also ==
- Islam in India
- List of mosques in India
- Hazrat Nizamuddin Dargah
- Mirza Halim Shah Dargah
- Shah Jalal Dargah
- Shrine of Baba Farid
- Turabul Haq Dargah
