= United States v. 12 200-ft. Reels of Film =

- Supreme Court of the United States

Argued January 19, 1972 Reargued November 7, 1972 Decided June 21, 1973
- Full case name: United States v. 12 200-ft. Reels of Super 8MM. Film et al
- Docket no.: 70-002
- Citations: 413 U.S. 123 (more) 93 S. Ct. 2665; 37 L. Ed. 2d 500
- Argument: Oral argument
- Reargument: Reargument
- Opinion announcement: Opinion announcement

Case history
- Prior: Judgment for claimant, unreported (C.D. Cal.)

Holding
- Reach of previous holding that possession of obscene material in home for personal use does not extend to import of same material; obscenity of material at issue to be re-adjudicated under newly established Miller v. California standard. Central District of California vacated and remanded

Court membership
- Chief Justice Warren E. Burger Associate Justices William O. Douglas · William J. Brennan Jr. Potter Stewart · Byron White; Thurgood Marshall · Harry Blackmun; Lewis F. Powell Jr. · William Rehnquist

Case opinions
- Majority: Burger, joined by White, Blackmun, Powell, Rehnquist
- Dissent: Douglas
- Dissent: Brennan, joined by Stewart, Marshall

Laws applied
- U.S. Const. amend. I

United States v. 12 200-ft. Reels of Film, 413 U.S. 123 (1973), was an in rem case decided by the United States Supreme Court that considered the question of whether the First Amendment required that citizens be allowed to import obscene material for their personal and private use at home, which was already held to be protected several years earlier. By a 5–4 margin, the Court held that it did not.

This case was very similar to United States v. Thirty-seven Photographs, a case the Court had heard two years earlier. It began when the films, and other visual and textual material with predominant explicit sexual content, were seized by customs agents from Paladini, a California man returning from Mexico. Federal law at the time prohibited the import of any material that might be judged to be obscene. Paladini challenged the forfeiture proceedings the government initiated, on the grounds that he intended the material for his personal use in the privacy of his own home, an activity the Court had ruled was protected under the First Amendment in Stanley v. Georgia. Thus, he argued, he had a right to obtain such material abroad for that purpose.

After a district court panel agreed with him and declared the statute unconstitutional, the case went to the Supreme Court directly. Its opinion was one of four obscenity cases handed down, along with Miller v. California, in which the Court announced a new standard of obscenity for the first time since Roth v. United States 17 years before. By a 5–4 margin, the Court held that the statute was constitutional, but it also ordered the district court to review the material under its new standard and consider whether it was still obscene.

Chief Justice Warren Burger wrote for the majority, reaffirming a similar holding in Thirty-seven Photographs that the right to possess something in one's home which might otherwise be unlawful outside of it did not give rise to a right to import it. William O. Douglas wrote a lengthy dissent, responding as much to the majority holding in Miller, arguing that history showed obscenity laws were not vigorously enforced at the time the Bill of Rights was adopted and thus could not be justified on traditionalist grounds. William Brennan wrote a shorter dissent, joined by the other two justices, calling the statute overbroad.

== Background of the case ==
For most of American history, literary and artistic works depicting, or even alluding to, sexual acts and topics or using profane language had been banned from publication or distribution, often by both confiscation of the works themselves and criminal prosecution of all individuals involved, following the traditions of English common law on obscenity and statutes at the state and federal levels. At the same time, demand for such materials continued, and the laws were often widely flouted. No defendant or claimant in such an action had ever persuaded a court to entertain the argument that the First Amendment's guarantees of free speech and free expression barred them.

That began to change during the 20th century, in response to social and cultural trends of greater tolerance for literature and art that depicted such proscribed material. In the landmark 1933 case United States v. One Book Called Ulysses, Judge John M. Woolsey of the Southern District of New York ruled that James Joyce's novel Ulysses, chapters of which had been held obscene over a decade earlier when published in a literary review, could not be barred from the United States purely on the basis of its language and content without considering its literary merit. Second Circuit judges Learned and Augustus Hand upheld Woolsey on appeal, and the book, considered a masterpiece of modernist literature, could be freely published and sold.

Censorship battles continued in the next decades over other works of literature and art, such as Lady Chatterley's Lover, expanding to include films. In 1957, the Supreme Court finally considered a case arising from an obscenity prosecution, Roth v. United States. William Brennan wrote for a 6–3 majority that upheld the criminal conviction but abandoned the century-old Hicklin test in favor of a narrower definition of obscenity. It did not settle the issue, however, and the Warren Court had to hear more cases arising from subsequent prosecutions in the next decade, during which the Sexual Revolution began a more direct challenge to social mores on the issue.

In some of those cases, like Memoirs v. Massachusetts, the justices realized their Roth standard was inadequate, but they could not agree on a new one. The search for a workable legal definition of obscenity led to Potter Stewart's famous line "I know it when I see it" in Jacobellis v. Ohio. Other Court decisions restricted the scope under which obscenity could be suppressed. Freedman v. Maryland held that local film boards could not ban films, effectively eliminating them, and that they had to approve a film within a specified period of time. In Stanley v. Georgia, the Court held that possession of obscene material in the privacy of the home was constitutionally protected as well.

=== United States v. Thirty-seven Photographs ===
United States v. Thirty-seven Photographs, like its companion case United States v. Reidel, was a Stanley-inspired challenge to the laws against the distribution of obscenity. In October 1969, Milton Luros, an adult-magazine publisher from Southern California, had challenged the seizure of the photographs, depicting naked heterosexual couples in various sexual positions, on his return to Los Angeles from Europe. He claimed he later planned to use them to illustrate a copy of the Kama Sutra.

In addition to arguing that Stanley gave him the right to import such material, Luros also challenged the procedures of the case under the Fifth Amendment, pointing out that the statute, Section 1305 of Title 18 of the United States Code, did not give a time frame within which the government had to begin forfeiture proceedings against the seized material and did not even require the government move in a timely fashion. A panel of two judges from the Central District of California and one judge from the Ninth Circuit Court of Appeals disagreed with him on the Stanley claim but found the lack of a time limit alone enough to hold Section 1305 unconstitutional.

The statute provided for direct appeal to the Supreme Court, which heard the case in 1971. By a 6–3 margin, the Supreme Court reversed the district court panel. "[A] port of entry is not a traveler's home," Justice Byron White wrote for the majority. "His right to be let alone neither prevents the search of his luggage nor the seizure of unprotected, but illegal, materials when his possession of them is discovered during such a search." Justice White found the Stanley argument less applicable, since Luros had admitted to the intent of commercial use.

However, Justice White agreed that without a time limit for when forfeiture proceedings had to begin, Section 1305 was an unconstitutional violation of due-process rights. Since Court doctrine holds that if it is possible to construe a statute in a way that avoids the constitutional question, it should be done, White construed Section 1305 to require a 14-day maximum time-frame from initial seizure to forfeiture filing. In separate concurrences, John Marshall Harlan II defended the statute against Luros's claim it was overbroad and Potter Stewart indicated his disagreement with the majority holding that Stanley did not extend to importing obscene material.

In dissent, Hugo Black, joined by William O. Douglas, reiterated his opposition to legally enforceable obscenity, and he attacked the majority both for usurping the legislative prerogative of imposing a time limit where there had been none and not extending Stanley: "The right to read and view any literature and pictures at home is hollow indeed if it does not include a right to carry that material privately in one's luggage when entering the country." Thurgood Marshall's dissent was at Reidel, where he felt that, since Luros had those pictures in his private personal possession when he cleared customs, Stanley was applicable.

== Underlying dispute ==
Paladini returned to Los Angeles International Airport after a trip to Mexico in April 1970. Customs agents inspecting his belongings discovered "movie films, color slides, photographs, and other printed and graphic material" of a possibly obscene nature, and confiscated them, without charging Paladini. Paladini claimed that they were for his own personal use, and he challenged the asset forfeiture proceedings as Luros had before him. Since he had not been criminally charged, the case was an in rem civil forfeiture action, with the reels of film and other items named as defendants.

Unlike Luros, he alleged no procedural defect in Section 1305. Instead, he argued that the entire statute was unconstitutional, since Stanley v. Georgia had held that the First Amendment protected the right to possess, read and view obscene material in the home and that allowed him to import such material for that use. The district court panel agreed, citing Thirty-seven Photographs, and struck down the statute. Again, the government appealed directly to the Supreme Court.

== Before the Court ==
The Court, as it had in Thirty-seven Photographs, granted certiorari and agreed to hear the case. Oral argument in Reels of Film was held in January 1972, with no decision for the rest of the term, since the Court had agreed to take some other obscenity cases. Before the beginning of the October 1972 term, Justices Hugo Black and John Marshall Harlan II retired, their deaths imminent. President Richard Nixon appointed William Rehnquist and Lewis Powell to replace them. Arguments were reheard in November 1972.

Thomas Kuchel, recently defeated in his re-election bid for his U.S. Senate seat from California, argued the case for the claimant at rehearing, by invitation of the Court. Solicitor General Erwin Griswold argued the case for the government. Amicus curiae briefs were filed by the American Civil Liberties Union and First Amendment Lawyers Association in support.

== Decision ==
In June 1973, near the end of the term, the Court handed down its opinion in all five cases. In Miller v. California, it succeeded, where it had failed seven years earlier in Memoirs v. Massachusetts, producing a new standard for obscenity that superseded the 1957 Roth v. United States holding. Miller impacted all the cases decided that day.

As he had in Miller, Chief Justice Warren Burger wrote for a five-justice majority in Reels of Film. He reaffirmed the Thirty-seven Photographs holding on the import ban, finding no distinction for private use and noting how holding it a protected activity could create a loophole that would make other laws intended to suppress the domestic distribution of obscenity ineffectual. However, in this case, the majority ordered the case remanded to district court to determine whether Paladini's materials were obscene under Miller, which called for "contemporary community standards" to be applied, rather than a national standard.

William O. Douglas wrote a lengthy dissent, responding in part to the Miller majority. At length, citing from histories of the era, he argued that, at the time of the country's founding, writers like Benjamin Franklin and John Cleland had enjoyed far greater freedom to write about sexual topics than even current law now allowed. The rights granted by Stanley were useless, he said, if one could not freely obtain the materials to read or view in the home. In a separate dissent, William Brennan said Section 1305 was overbroad and unconstitutional.

=== Majority ===
Burger recounted the facts of the case, and he then turned to the Stanley argument. "But it is now well established that obscene material is not protected by the First Amendment", he wrote, referring to the Court's other holdings that day. Stanley he continued, was fundamentally a case about privacy and the Fourth Amendment rather than free speech and the First.

Courts should avoid granting inferential, incremental steps like these, Burger cautioned, in one of the most frequently quoted sections of the case:

The seductive plausibility of single steps in a chain of evolutionary development of a legal rule is often not perceived until a third, fourth, or fifth "logical" extension occurs. Each step, when taken, appeared a reasonable step in relation to that which preceded it, although the aggregate or end result is one that would never have been seriously considered in the first instance. This kind of gestative propensity calls for the "line drawing" familiar in the judicial, as in the legislative process: "thus far, but not beyond."

It did not matter that, unlike the claimant in Thirty-seven Photographs, Paladini insisted that the materials were for private personal use. "To allow such a claim would be not unlike compelling the Government to permit importation of prohibited or controlled drugs for private consumption as long as such drugs are not for public distribution or sale." In one of the other cases, United States v. Orito, the Court had upheld federal law prohibiting obscenity from being sent through domestic cargo shippers, paralleling its decision of two years earlier in Thirty-seven Photographs's companion case United States v. Reidel, which affirmed the prohibition on sending obscenity through the mail. Congress could, Burger admitted, allow the transmission and import of such materials with appropriate security measures to prevent unwilling recipients or children from being exposed to them, two legitimate state interests Stanley had recognized. But it had not.

Having dealt with the major issue, Burger added an afterthought, observing "that it is extremely difficult to control the uses to which obscene material is put once it enters this country" since it was by then technologically possible to make many copies very quickly and cheaply of a single original. But, "[w]hile it is true that a large volume of obscene material on microfilm could rather easily be smuggled into the United States by mail, or otherwise, and could be enlarged or reproduced for commercial purposes, Congress is not precluded from barring some avenues of illegal importation because avenues exist that are more difficult to regulate."

=== Dissents ===
"I know of no constitutional way by which a book, tract, paper, postcard, or film may be made contraband because of its contents", Douglas began, reiterating the opposition to obscenity laws he had stated in many opinions over the preceding years. "The Constitution never purported to give the Federal Government censorship or oversight over literature or artistic productions, save as they might be governed by the Patent and Copyright Clause ..."

Justice Douglas responded to the Miller majority's argument that the First Amendment necessarily incorporated the common-law strictures on obscenity that existed at that time. James Madison, in drafting the Bill of Rights, intended for them to apply strictly to the federal government. (Note: After the Fourteenth Amendment was adopted following the Civil War, the Bill of Rights was held to apply to the states as well.) "Tying censorship to the movement of literature or films in interstate commerce or into foreign commerce would have been an easy way for a government of delegated powers to impair the liberty of expression. It was to bar such suppression that we have the First Amendment. I daresay Jefferson and Madison would be appalled at what the Court espouses today."

Histories of the era, Douglas wrote, show that at the time of the Constitution's adoption many sexually frank works such as Fanny Hill circulated widely, with little censorship or prosecution." In Bridges v. California, a 1941 decision overturning the contempt conviction of a labor leader for publishing a telegram from a state official, the Court had itself quoted Madison to the effect that the Revolution specifically intended to replace English common law on freedom of speech and the press, since Magna Carta said nothing about them. And the Court's own recent efforts to define obscenity "have not been productive of meaningful standards ... The reason is not the inability or mediocrity of judges".

"[I]t is ironic to me," Douglas concluded, "that, in this Nation, many pages must be written and many hours spent to explain why a person who can read whatever he desires ... may not without violating a law carry that literature in his briefcase or bring it home from abroad. Unless there is that ancillary right, one's Stanley rights could be realized, as has been suggested, only if one wrote or designed a tract in his attic and printed or processed it in his basement, so as to be able to read it in his study." (Note: Douglas was referring to Black's suggestion as such in his Thirty-seven Photographs dissent, 402 U.S. at 382.)

Brennan's short dissent reflected the change in his thinking about obscenity. It alluded to his dissent in another of the companion cases, Paris Adult Theatre I v. Slaton, in which he said he no longer believed it was reasonably possible for judges to define obscenity, even narrowly. For that reason, he considered any statute that attempted to do so, or suppressed obscenity based on that definition, as overbroad and unconstitutional on its face.

== Subsequent jurisprudence ==
The Court's clear holding that the privately possessed obscene material did not create the right to distribute it became part of its general body on the subject. In the wake of Miller, that has not had to be revisited, since general obscenity prosecutions declined, technology allowed more discreet methods of obtaining pornography, and the Court has not had to reconsider its standard. Enforcement mostly turned to child pornography, the production and distribution of which Congress banned with the Child Protection Act of 1978. Four years later, the Court held that obscene material depicting actual children was not protected speech in New York v. Ferber in 1982.

Until that statute was further revised in 1984, possession of child pornography was still legal. (Note: The Court upheld possession bans in Osborne v. Ohio, 495 U.S. 103 (1990).) An Oregon man appealed his 1983 conviction, for receiving sexually explicit films with underage teenagers in the mail from Sweden, and asked the Ninth Circuit to reject the Reels of Film holding. It instead relied on it in upholding the conviction, telling the appellee to take it up with the Supreme Court.

Justice Antonin Scalia, who replaced Burger in 1986, twice approvingly quoted the chief justice's warning in Reels of Film about the dangers of incremental judicial expansion of a statutory construction. In NLRB v. Electrical Workers, upholding union disciplinary action against members who had worked for a nonunion employer, decided in Scalia's first term, he cited Burger in his concurrence, explaining his textualist approach to jurisprudence, calling it "nowhere more applicable". Almost two decades later, dissenting in Tennessee v. Lane, Scalia repeated the entire passage again.

== See also ==
- List of United States Supreme Court cases, volume 413
- List of United States Supreme Court cases by the Burger Court
- List of United States Supreme Court cases involving the First Amendment
