= United States v. Thirty-seven Photographs =

- Supreme Court of the United States

Argued January 20, 1971 Decided May 3, 1971
- Full case name: United States v. Thirty-seven Photographs
- Docket no.: 70-133
- Citations: 402 U.S. 363 (more) 91 S. Ct. 1400; 28 L. Ed. 2d 822
- Argument: Oral argument
- Opinion announcement: Opinion announcement

Case history
- Prior: Judgment for petitioner, 309 F.Supp 36, (C.D. Cal., 1970)

Holding
- Federal statute prohibiting importation of obscene material is not overbroad as long as forfeiture proceedings are commenced within 14 days of seizure, nor does First Amendment require exception for importation of such material for private use. Central District of California reversed and remanded

Court membership
- Chief Justice Warren E. Burger Associate Justices Hugo Black · William O. Douglas; John M. Harlan II · William J. Brennan Jr. Potter Stewart · Byron White; Thurgood Marshall · Harry Blackmun

Case opinions
- Majority: White (Part I), joined by Burger, Harlan, Brennan, Stewart and Blackmun
- Plurality: White (Part II), joined by Burger, Brennan, Blackmun
- Concurrence: Harlan (in part and in judgment)
- Concurrence: Stewart (in part and in judgment)
- Dissent: Black, joined by Douglas
- Dissent: Marshall

Laws applied
- U.S. Const. Amendment I; 19 USC 1305

United States v. Thirty-seven Photographs, 402 U.S. 363 (1971), is a United States Supreme Court decision in an in rem case on procedures following the seizure of imported obscene material. A 6–3 court held that the federal statute governing the seizures was not in violation of the First Amendment as long as the government began forfeiture proceedings within 14 days of the seizure.

The case began with the seizure of the photographs, depicting various sexual positions, from Milton Luros, a Southern California publisher who was returning from Europe. He had intended to use them to illustrate a volume of the Kama Sutra, or failing that, to keep them for his own personal use. A district court panel, guided by the Court's Freedman v. Maryland decision of several years before, rejected his claims that the First Amendment allowed citizens to import obscene material, but found the statute unconstitutional due to the lack of time limits and ordered the Customs Service to return the images to Luros. The government appealed directly to the Supreme Court.

Justice Byron White wrote for the majority, distinguishing the case from Freedman v. Maryland, which had also involved time limits, by noting that it was a federal statute rather than a state one and therefore the Court could give it an authoritative construction. John Marshall Harlan and Potter Stewart also wrote concurring opinions expanding on aspects of the majority holding. Stewart did not agree with the majority that the ban on personal importation of obscene material was consistent with Stanley v. Georgia.

The dissenting justices wrote two opinions. Hugo Black and William O. Douglas took issue with every aspect of the holding, believing the government had no power to regulate obscenity. Thurgood Marshall agreed with them and Stewart that the blanket importation ban was constitutional. That issue would be reconsidered in a similar case two years later, United States v. 12 200-ft. Reels of Film. The case would have little impact on the future development of obscenity law. It has, however, been cited as the first forfeiture case to deal with the question of time limits, and also reaffirmed a principle by which the Court avoids dealing with constitutional questions when it can through alternative constructions.

== Background of the case ==
For most of American history, literary and artistic works depicting or even alluding to sexual acts and topics or using profane language, had been banned from publication or distribution, often by both confiscation of the works themselves and criminal prosecution of all individuals involved, following the traditions of English common law on obscenity and statutes at the state and federal levels. At the same time, demand for such materials continued, and the laws were often widely flouted. No defendant or claimant in such an action had ever persuaded a court to entertain the argument that the First Amendment's guarantees of free speech and free expression barred them.

That began to change during the 20th century, in response to social and cultural trends of greater tolerance for literature and art that depicted such proscribed material. In the landmark 1933 case United States v. One Book Called Ulysses, Judge John M. Woolsey of the Southern District of New York ruled that James Joyce's novel Ulysses, chapters of which had been held obscene over a decade earlier when published in a literary review, could not be barred from the United States purely on the basis of its language and content without considering its literary merit. Second Circuit judges Learned Hand and Augustus Hand upheld Woolsey on appeal, and the book, considered a masterpiece of modernist literature, could be freely published and sold.

Censorship battles continued in the next decades over other works of literature and art, such as Lady Chatterley's Lover, expanding to include films. In 1957, the Supreme Court finally considered a case arising from an obscenity prosecution, Roth v. United States. William Brennan wrote for a 6–3 majority that upheld the criminal conviction but abandoned the century-old Hicklin test in favor of a narrower definition of obscenity. It did not settle the issue, however, and the Warren Court had to hear more cases arising from subsequent prosecutions in the next decade, during which the Sexual Revolution began a more direct challenge to social mores on the issue.

In some of those cases, like Memoirs v. Massachusetts, the justices realized their Roth standard was inadequate, but they could not agree on a new one. The search for a workable legal definition of obscenity led to Potter Stewart's famous line "I know it when I see it", in Jacobellis v. Ohio. Other Court decisions restricted the scope under which obscenity could be suppressed. Freedman v. Maryland held that local film boards could not ban films, effectively eliminating them, and had to approve a film within a specified time. In Stanley v. Georgia, the Court held that possession of obscene material in the privacy of the home was constitutionally protected as well.

== Underlying dispute ==
In October 1969, Milton Luros, a former illustrator turned adult magazine publisher, returned to Los Angeles from a trip to Europe. Customs agents at Los Angeles International Airport searched his luggage and found 37 photographs depicting naked heterosexual couples having sexual intercourse in different positions. They confiscated them pursuant to Title 19, Section 1305, of the United States Code, a federal law passed in 1930 absolutely prohibiting the importation of any obscene material, but they did not arrest Luros for attempting to violate the law. He later revealed he had planned to use the photos to illustrate a copy of the Kama Sutra, the classic Indian treatise on human sexuality.

Two weeks later, lawyers with the office of United States Attorney William Matthew Byrne, Jr. filed for forfeiture. A week later, Luros filed a counterclaim. He argued that the images were not obscene, and he claimed that both the seizure and the statute authorizing it were unconstitutional. The seizure had violated his First Amendment rights since the pictures were meant to be viewed by adults only within the privacy of their own homes, which the Supreme Court had recently held was protected activity in Stanley. As for the statute, not only was it too vague to be enforceable, it allowed seizures prior to an adversary hearing and did not require that the forfeiture action be commenced within a specified time period, both violating due process requirements, Luros argued.

== In district court ==
The law provided for contested forfeitures to be heard by a panel of three judges, similar to an appellate hearing. Since Luros had not been criminally charged himself, the case was an in rem action, with the photographs themselves as the defendants. Stanley Barnes from the Ninth Circuit Court of Appeals was seated along with Central District of California judges Jesse William Curtis Jr. and Warren John Ferguson. They heard arguments from Luros's attorney Stanley Fleishman and the assistant U.S. attorneys representing Byrne's office, and they then issued their decision in January 1970.

Ferguson wrote for the panel, which unanimously ruled for Luros. After rejecting the publisher's argument that Stanley absolutely covered the photographs, since he had admitted to planning a commercial use for them, the judge considered the other element of the First Amendment argument: the right of other adults to receive the book. While quoting from William Brennan's concurrence in Lamont v. Postmaster General to demonstrate his agreement that it was a fundamental right, he nevertheless found it inapplicable to the case, since ruling otherwise would have an economically disparate impact: "The First Amendment cannot be construed to permit those who have funds for foreign travel to bring back constitutionally protected literature while prohibiting its access by the less affluent."

Instead, Ferguson found the due-process claims much more relevant. Freedman had held that any statutory process by which obscene material was seized and potentially suppressed must explicitly require a hearing within a brief period of the time of seizure. While Luros admitted that the government had moved to hold a forfeiture hearing within a reasonable time period of the photographs' seizure, it still took 76 days until the court had heard the case. "All concede that under present statutory procedures it could not have been accomplished any sooner." The delay was also not necessarily due to bureaucratic delays. Ferguson observed that "Section 1305 does not prohibit customs agents from long delaying judicial determination. The First Amendment does not permit such discretion." Having reached that conclusion, he declined to consider Luros's other arguments and ordered the photographs returned following a 30-day stay to allow the government time to appeal if it wished to do so.

== Before the Court ==
The government appealed directly to the Supreme Court, as statute allowed it to do so, and was granted certiorari. The Court heard oral arguments almost a year later, on the same day as United States v. Reidel, another case directly appealed from the Central District of California challenging, under Stanley as well, the prohibitions against mailing obscene material to willing adult recipients.

Fleishman argued for Luros and the photographs again. Solicitor General Erwin Griswold appeared for the government.

== Decision ==
The Court handed down its decision in the case in May 1971, on the same day as Reidel. In both cases, the majorities had declined to extend Stanley to cover the distribution of obscene material. Justice White wrote both opinions.

In Thirty-seven Photographs, two of the justices who had joined the majority, John Marshall Harlan and Potter Stewart, also wrote concurrences. Hugo Black and William O. Douglas, both of whom had long made it clear they believed the government had no business forbidding obscenity, wrote an extensive dissent critical of all elements of White's opinion. Thurgood Marshall wrote a separate concurrence in Reidel that also explained his reasons for dissenting in Thirty-seven Photographs.

=== Majority opinion ===
Unlike the situation in Freedman, Justice White observed, the challenged statute was federal, rather than state. Thus, "it is possible to construe the section to bring it in harmony with constitutional requirements." He reviewed the legislative history of Section 1305 and found that senators during debate had been concerned about putting so much power in the hands of a low-level official. As a result, the bill was amended to allow for review.

At that time, no time requirement was included. Perhaps those senators, Justice White speculated, had not seen a need to do so, but, nearly four decades later, there was. In some cases, months had passed between the seizure and the hearing. "[F]idelity to Congress' purpose dictates that we read explicit time limits into the section," he wrote. Otherwise, the only possible resolution to the case was to hold the statute unconstitutional, but that, too, had been prevented by a severability provision. Based on other such statutes with a time-limit provision, Justice White found 14 days to be an apt requirement.

Justice White did not find the analogy to Stanley convincing. That case did not support a right to import obscene materials for private use. "[A] port of entry is not a traveler's home. His right to be let alone neither prevents the search of his luggage nor the seizure of unprotected, but illegal, materials when his possession of them is discovered during such a search."

=== Concurrences ===
Justices Harlan and Stewart had also joined the first part of White's opinion, creating the 14-day rule from Freedman. Harlan chose to defend the statute from Luros's claim that it was overbroad, which the district court had not ruled on and so did not have to be addressed by the majority. "It is incontestable that 19 U.S.C. § 1305(a) is intended to cover, at the very least, importation of obscene materials for commercial purposes," he wrote. "Since the parties stipulated that the materials were imported for commercial purposes, Luros cannot claim that his primary conduct was not intended to be within the statute's sweep." Only a holding that Stanley covered the importation of obscene material for private use would force a reconsideration of the constitutionality of the entire statute, due to the severability clause, and Harlan thought that should be avoided since it was not necessary to decide that question in order to resolve the case.

Stewart's short concurrence differed with Justice White and the other justices over the applicability of the Stanley holding to the importation of obscene material for private use. "The terms of the statute appear to apply to an American tourist who, after exercising his constitutionally protected liberty to travel abroad, returns home with a single book in his luggage, with no intention of selling it or otherwise using it, except to read it," he wrote. "If the Government can constitutionally take the book away from him as he passes through customs, then I do not understand the meaning of Stanley v. Georgia".

=== Dissents ===
At the beginning of his dissent, Justice Black reiterated his opposition to the concept of obscenity as completely beyond the reach of the Constitution. "In my view, the First Amendment denies Congress the power to act as censor and determine what books our citizens may read and what pictures they may watch." He found it most objectionable that the majority had returned to that aspect of the Roth holding, since the Court's own jurisprudence since then had found the concept difficult to define. "After Roth, our docket and those of other courts have constantly been crowded with cases where judges are called upon to decide whether a particular book, magazine, or movie may be banned. I have expressed before my view that I can imagine no task for which this Court of lifetime judges is less equipped to deal." As such, he had thought the Court was beginning to abandon Roth. Since it had instead affirmed it in both of the cases that it decided that day, he warned that:

... for the foreseeable future, this Court must sit as a Board of Supreme Censors, sifting through books and magazines and watching movies because some official fears they deal too explicitly with sex. I can imagine no more distasteful, useless, and time-consuming task for the members of this Court than perusing this material to determine whether it has "redeeming social value." This absurd spectacle could be avoided if we would adhere to the literal command of the First Amendment that "Congress shall make no law ... abridging the freedom of speech, or of the press."

Justice Black turned to specific issues with the majority. He had not found its explanation of how the district court had erred in applying Stanley to the importation of images for private use. As a general matter, he wrote, "[t]he mere act of importation for private use can hardly be more offensive to others than is private perusal in one's home. The right to read and view any literature and pictures at home is hollow indeed if it does not include a right to carry that material privately in one's luggage when entering the country." Nor did he find the majority's specific reason, that travelers returning from abroad and their luggage are routinely subject to search, compelling since it was just as likely that police would search a private home for reasons unrelated to suspected possession of obscene material. (Note: As had occurred in Stanley.)

Perhaps, he speculated, the majority had assumed, without actually saying so, that the import ban was necessary to prevent the distribution of obscene material through domestic commercial channels. However, an analogous argument had been specifically rejected in Stanley, and, as a general principle, the Court had held in other First Amendment cases that a restriction on protected rights that served a state interest had to be narrowly tailored to that interest. Since the plurality (Note: Because Harlan had indicated he merely concurred in the Stanley analysis without joining it, and Stewart did not concur with it at all, that section of the majority opinion is considered a plurality, since it does not command a majority of the justices.) did not make that distinction, "I can only conclude that, at least four members of the Court would overrule Stanley. Or perhaps, in the future, that case will be recognized as good law only when a man writes salacious books in his attic, prints them in his basement, and reads them in his living room." (Note: By the 21st century, three decades after Thirty-seven Photographs was decided, this was actually possible and practical.)

Justice Black also criticized the imposition of the 14-day time limit on a textualist basis, an approach he commonly employed. The majority should have simply found the statute unconstitutional for lacking one and affirmed the district court on that basis, leaving the actual revision of Section 1305 to Congress. As it was, the Court's action "represents a seizure of legislative power that we simply do not possess under the Constitution."

There were also specific problems with that action in the instant case. Justice Black also argued that the legislative history of the statute's adoption, which the majority had used as a basis for imposing this limit, did not, in fact, support its action, since it referred to a version of the statute that was never actually adopted. In previous obscenity-related cases, where the Court had held that the statutes could be amended to bring them into constitutional compliance, it had declined to do so. Nor had it let severability provisions stop such holdings.

Since he could not find the time limit justified by either previous jurisprudence or the legislative history of the statute, Justice Black suspected the majority was deriving them from the First Amendment itself. If that was so, he found it:

... both peculiar and disturbing. The rules are not derived by considering what the First Amendment demands, but by surveying previously litigated cases and then guessing what limits would not pose an "undue hardship" on the Government and the lower federal courts. Scant attention is given to the First Amendment rights of persons entering the country. Certainly it gives little comfort to an American bringing a book home to Colorado or Alabama for personal reading to be informed without explanation that a 74-day delay at New York harbor is not "undue." Faced with such lengthy legal proceedings and the need to hire a lawyer far from home, he is likely to be coerced into giving up his First Amendment rights. Thus, the whims of customs clerks or the congestion of their business will determine what Americans may read.

Marshall's dissent, at Reidel, distinguished that case from Thirty-seven Photographs by noting that the delivery of obscene material via the mail presented the hazard that children or unwilling recipients would be exposed to it, which the state had an interest in preventing, whereas only Luros would be exposed to the photographs. "[T]he seized items were then in his purely private possession and threatened neither children nor anyone else.

== Subsequent jurisprudence ==
The Supreme Court got a chance to reconsider Thirty-seven Photographs very quickly. While it reached a broader, similar conclusion, the law was eventually repealed, and there were no further cases. The case has also been cited for its procedural holdings in other forfeiture cases.

=== United States v. 12 200-ft. Reels of Film ===
Shortly after the case had been heard in district court, another, very similar seizure action started the next case that would allow the Supreme Court to revisit the issues of Thirty-seven Photographs, with a key difference. In April 1970, a California resident named Paladini was searched by customs agents in Los Angeles upon returning from Mexico. As they had with Luros, they found obscene material in his luggage, described later as "movie films, color slides, photographs, and other printed and graphic material". He, too, was not charged, and challenged the forfeiture.

Another in rem case, United States v. 12 200-ft. Reels of Super 8MM. Film et al, began. This time, the claimant insisted the subject materials were intended for purely private and personal use, and they asserted, as Luros had, that Stanley permitted such importation. A similar panel relied on its predecessor's opinion in Thirty-seven Photographs and likewise held Section 1305 unconstitutional, not just for the procedural shortcomings but as a violation of the First Amendment on its face. The government appealed to the Supreme Court, which decided to hear what was now United States v. 12 200-ft. Reels of Film.

Justices Black and Harlan, both of whom died shortly thereafter, retired before the October 1971 term began. With their seats vacant, the case would be argued twice, along with four other obscenity-related cases the Court had decided to take. William Rehnquist had been seated to replace Harlan before the January hearing, but the delay in seating Lewis Powell to bring the Court back to full strength delayed a rehearing into the next term, to November 1972.

The decisions in all five cases were announced on the same day at the end of the term, since one was Miller v. California, in which a majority had agreed on a new standard of obscenity, superseding Roth. It governed the application of the other cases, including Reels of Film, which was remanded to the district court to determine if the materials met the new standard of obscenity, which relied on contemporary community standards rather than a national one.

Chief Justice Warren Burger wrote for a 5–4 majority, including the two new justices, that Stanley was still inapplicable to the importation of obscene material. "To allow such a claim would be not unlike compelling the Government to permit importation of prohibited or controlled drugs for private consumption as long as such drugs are not for public distribution or sale." Justice Douglas's much lengthier dissent reviewed the history of obscenity in the United States, noting it appeared not to have been vigorously prosecuted in Colonial America, if at all, and thus an obscenity exemption could not be presumed to have been implicit in the First Amendment as the Miller majority had suggested. "[I]t is ironic to me that, in this Nation, many pages must be written and many hours spent to explain why a person who can read whatever he desires", he wrote, "may not without violating a law carry that literature in his briefcase or bring it home from abroad." William Brennan wrote a shorter dissent, joined by Justices Stewart and Marshall, agreeing with the district court that Section 1305 was unconstitutional.

=== Other cases ===
Most later jurisprudence that has relied on Thirty-seven Photographs has referred to its requirement of a time limit for forfeiture proceedings. Within six months, the Tenth Circuit heard and decided Sarkisian v. United States, (Note: Alternatively known by the in rem name United States v. One Package of Antiques and Indian Jewelry.) in which the Customs Service had refused to return a parcel containing jewelry purchased in Lebanon, claiming that it had been fraudulently misrepresented as antique. As in Thirty-seven Photographs, the statute authorizing the seizure set no time limit for formal proceedings to begin, and the court was unconvinced by government attempts to distinguish the case for lack of an obscenity allegation. "The withholding of Sarkisian's property under the circumstances before us presents a constitutional claim of no less dignity than that arising from the dirty pictures. We thus apply the same principles", wrote Judge Oliver Seth. It remanded the case with instructions to return the package. Several years later, Judge Walter Herbert Rice of the Southern District of Ohio described Thirty-seven Photographs as "the earliest significant treatment of delay in a forfeiture context."

It has also been a touchstone case for the Court's standard of review. Later cases cited it as reaffirming the principle by which the Court avoids ruling on the constitutionality of a statute if it can find a way to construe the statute such that the constitutional question is avoided. (Note: The language quoted where the case is cited to this effect—"It is a cardinal principle that this Court will first ascertain whether a construction of the statute is fairly possible by which the constitutional question may be avoided"—is actually from a much earlier case, Crowell v. Benson, 285 U.S. 22, 62 (1932), Hughes, C.J. The Court itself quoted this section in Lorillard v. Pons, (434 U.S. 575, 577, (1978), Marshall, J.). The Third Circuit's citation of this in Cox v. Keystone Carbon Co., 861 F.2d 390, 393 note 4 (3rd Cir.,1988), is the most notable lower-court reference.) In New York v. Ferber, its landmark 1982 holding that child pornography was outside First Amendment protection, the Court clarified that under Thirty-seven Photographs, if such a construction was impossible but the statute was severable, only the unconstitutional portions should be invalidated.

== See also ==
- List of United States Supreme Court cases, volume 402
- List of United States Supreme Court cases by the Burger Court
- List of United States Supreme Court cases involving the First Amendment
