= Definitions of pornography =

Pornography definitions

One of the biggest issues in the pornography debate has been defining pornography. Some consider pornography as any depiction of nudity or sexual activity, while others only count depictions in which a participant is abused or degraded. There also exists disputes on whether erotica is inherently pornographic or not.

== By dictionaries and encyclopedias ==
=== Merriam-Webster ===
On December 15, 2005, the Merriam-Webster Online Dictionary defined pornography under 3 definitions:

- the depiction of erotic behavior (as in pictures, or writing) intended to cause sexual excitement
- material (as books, or a photograph) that depicts erotic behavior and is intended to cause sexual excitement
- the depiction of acts in a sensational manner so as to arouse a quick intense emotional reaction

They defined the etymology of pornography as being derived from the Greek word "pornographos" meaning "writing about prostitutes", which comes from "pornE" meaning "prostitute" and "graphein" meaning "to write", relating this to the Greeks word "pernanai" meaning "to sell" and "poros" meaning journey.

Sometime from June 9, 2017, up to July 8, 2017, this dictionary added a new section where they claimed the first known use of the term "pornography" was in 1842.

Additionally, sometime from September 17, 2025, up to November 6, 2025, this dictionary included "movies" in the first and second definition, alongside "often disapproving" for all three.

== By government bodies ==
=== Canada ===
The Special Committee on Pornography and Prostitution was established by the Canadian government in June 1983. In their 1985 report, while not providing an exact definition of pornography, they believed pornography should be distinguished from erotica.

=== China ===
On March 14, 1997, the Criminal Law of the People's Republic of China was promulgated with a definition for pornographic materials. Under Article 367, "pornographic materials refer to obscene books, periodicals, movies, video-and audio-tapes, pictures, etc. that explicitly portray sexual behavior or undisguisedly publicize pornographic materials." Under this Law, human physiology or medical knowledge classified as scientific works are not considered pornographic materials. Additionally, any art work or literature containing erotic content that is deemed to have artistic value is not classified in this Law as pornographic materials.

== By lawyers ==
=== Potter Stewart ===
Potter Stewart served as Justice for the 1964 United States Supreme Court case Jacobellis v. Ohio where he wrote in terms of hard-core pornography that "I shall not today attempt further to define the kinds of material I understand to be embraced within that shorthand description; and perhaps I could never succeed in intelligibly doing so. But I know it when I see it, and the motion picture involved in this case is not that." However, some have argued that Stewart's phrase "I know it when I see it" applies to all forms of pornography. Sometime from October 16, 2016, and November 6, 2016, the Meriam-Webster dictionary commented on this trend with a new section stating "For many people, any attempt to define the word pornography calls to mind the oft-quoted line from Supreme Court Justice Potter Stewart in 1964: “. . . I know it when I see it.” While compilers of dictionaries might wish to be granted such latitude in explaining the meaning of certain words, they are held to a higher standard."
