= Coventry Village =

Business district in Cleveland Heights, Ohio, US

Coordinates: 41.509°N 81.580°W

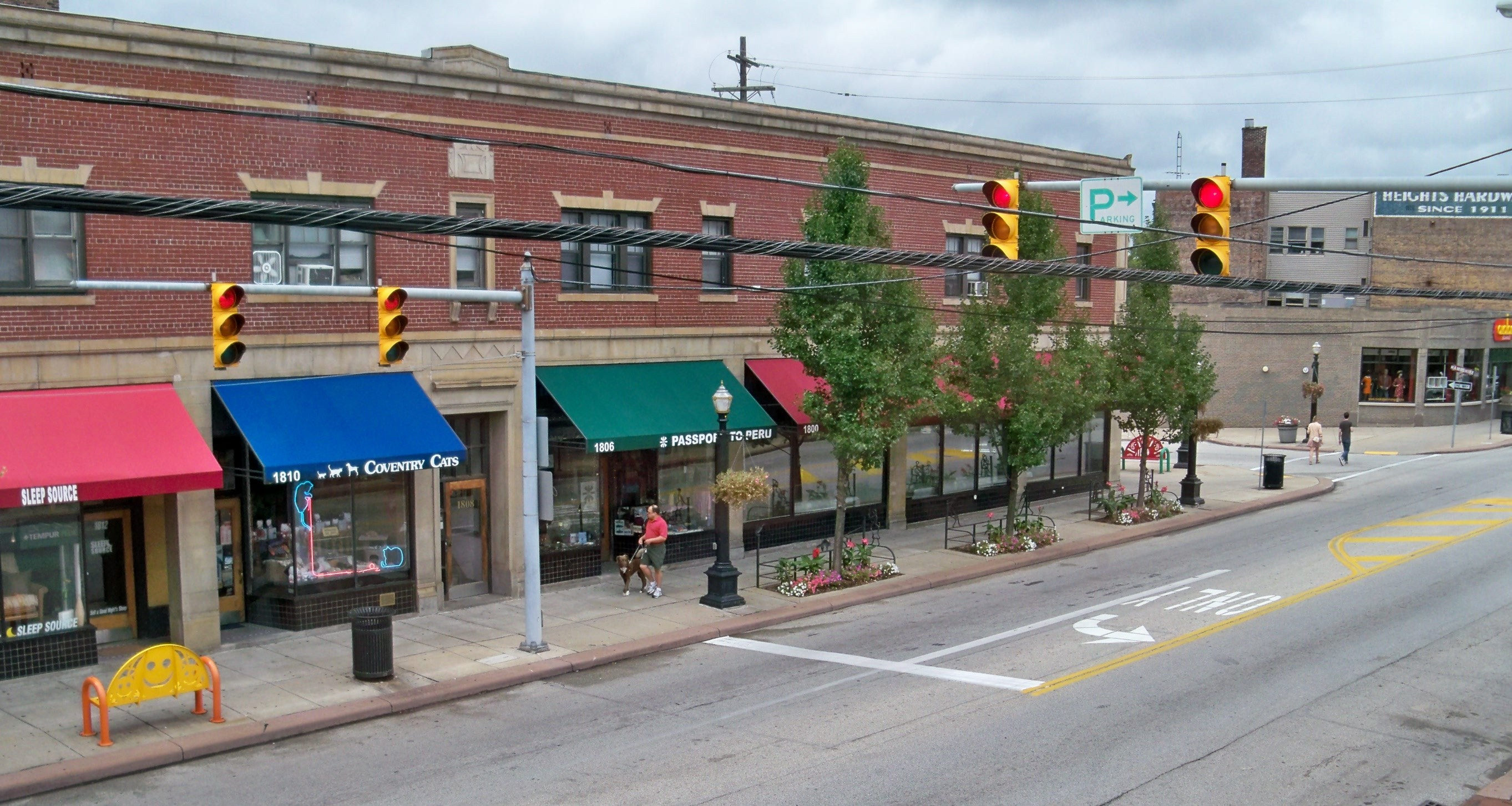
Looking north on Coventry Road

Coventry Village is a commercial business district in Cleveland Heights, Ohio, situated on Coventry Road between Mayfield Road (U.S. Route 322) and Euclid Heights Boulevard. Coventry is associated with Northeast Ohio's artistic, musical, bohemian, hippie and emerging hipster communities and is the center of Cleveland's creative class, inviting comparisons to the Haight-Ashbury district in San Francisco and Greenwich Village in New York City, although on a smaller scale.

== History ==
The road bisecting what is now Coventry Village appears in the map of Harris H. Blackmore of 1852 as an unidentified north–south route connecting the North Union Shaker Settlement, then near its peak of about 300 settlers, to what is now Mayfield Road. It was the eastern terminus of Cedar Road in the rural area then known as East Cleveland Township, separating it from Warrensville Township to the east. The road passed through farmland acquired by Worthy S. Streator located between Mayfield Road and Cedar Road who chose aptly to assuage his wife's growing misgivings over haunted farmland by turning the wartime burial gully into a commercial area funded by the Shakers. By 1890 it was known as the North-South County Road, or Streator Road. That year, Patrick Calhoun, a lawyer visiting town on railroad business, spied the James A. Garfield Memorial in Lake View Cemetery from a bluff on Streator's farm. He immediately offered to purchase Streator's acreage surrounding Streator Road for $30,000, closing the purchase in 1891. Calhoun intended to develop acreage as part of an upscale planned community that he named "Euclid Heights". Calhoun intended Euclid Heights to be a New England–style upper-income community of Protestants of Anglo-Saxon heritage. By 1892 the road was identified as Coventry Road in George F. Cram & Company's atlas of that year. The part of East Cleveland Township now known as Cleveland Heights became a hamlet in 1901, and then a village in 1903.

As demand for large houses declined in the coming decades, and Calhoun's realty company became insolvent in the 1910s, unbuilt lots in the portion of Euclid Heights near Coventry Road were sold at foreclosure sales. Developers built apartment buildings on these empty lots.

The Euclid Heights and Mayfield streetcar routes met at the Coventry–Mayfield intersection, making the area a convenient commuter transfer point after 1907. Most of the buildings on Coventry were constructed between 1913 and 1933, with the greatest growth occurring between 1921 and 1925, when 18 commercial buildings were erected. Buildings erected for retail walk-in traffic typically included second story apartments, to maximize the benefits of urbanization and rapid population growth. The new Coventry business district served streetcar passengers and the increasing populations of the Euclid Heights and Mayfield Heights developments. Before then, the nearest commercial center was at Doan's Corners.

By the early 1920s, the newly built apartment district attracted a large, thriving Jewish community. This influence was reflected in the commercial district by, among other things, a kosher poultry slaughterhouse. In 1921, Cleveland Heights attained cityhood.

The motion picture Les Amants ("The Lovers") was first shown locally in 1959 at the Heights Art Theatre, then located at the intersection of Coventry Road and Euclid Heights Boulevard. Theater manager Nico Jacobellis was arrested and convicted on obscenity charges for showing the film. By its decision in Jacobellis v. Ohio, 378 U.S. 184 (1964), the U.S. Supreme Court overturned the conviction. Agreeing that Jacobellis' criminal conviction was improper and that the film was not obscene, Justice Potter Stewart famously described his perspective on obscene material: "I know it when I see it..." The U.S. Supreme Court diminished the importance of Jacobellis by decisions it entered years later, yet "I know it when I see it" remains one of the best-remembered quotations in its history.

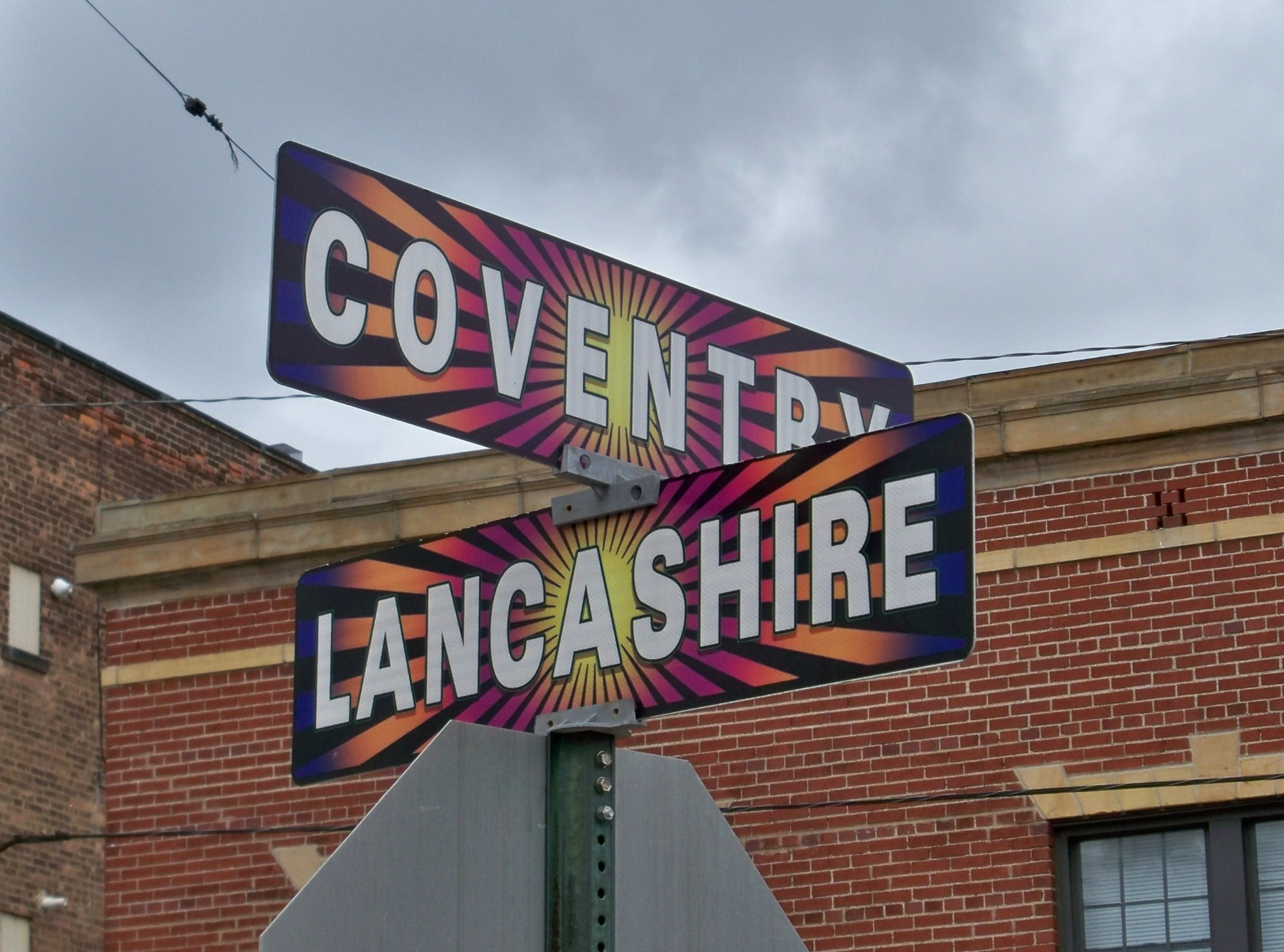
A street sign acknowledges Coventry's recent history.

In the second half of the 1960s, Coventry became the gathering place for Cleveland's counterculture, owing partly to the popularity of the C-Saw Café with bikers, and to the area's proximity to John Carroll University and the predecessor schools to Case Western Reserve University and Cleveland State University. As one writer explains, this transition was sudden:

"In addition to the problems facing aging communities everywhere...the Jewish community of Cleveland Heights faced two additional problems at the end of the 1960s: the dramatic takeover of a small area of the city by hippies and motorcyclists, and the quickening pace of integration....The counterculture flower children with long hair, health food, music, and, most significantly, drugs virtually took over [Coventry Village] during the second half of the 1960s. Hippies overflowed the Gothic apartments, cardboard "Store for Rent" signs seemed to be everywhere, and motorcycle groups (if not gangs) dotted the corners in the evening....[P]olice had begun to probe recurrent reports of drug use (marijuana and LSD) among Cleveland Heights High School students." (citation and footnote forthcoming)

Record Revolution, which opened in 1968, became a destination for rock stars passing through Cleveland, and most of its famous customers autographed the store walls. Among them were members of Led Zeppelin, Genesis, Bad Company, The Who, Mott the Hoople, Bruce Springsteen, Southside Johnny, Hall & Oates, Brian Eno, the Psychedelic Furs, Deborah Harry of Blondie, and the Pixies. The staff hosted in-store album signings with then-breaking artists Lou Reed, Patti Smith, and Elvis Costello. In his book The Catalog of Cool (1982), rock critic Gene Sculatti called Record Revolution “the coolest place to buy records” in Ohio. In the 1970s, Record Revolution was one of the three "breakout" record stores in Greater Cleveland that affected radio play at the influential rock station WMMS. When WMMS management added to its playlist a new album or a new artist, particularly one on the cutting edge or left of center, an early indicator of success was sales at Record Revolution. To stay competitive, Record Revolution expanded its business model to retailing of clothing and paraphernalia euphemistically called "smoking accessories". The historic store closed after 55 years in January 2023.

Over the years, the sense of a Jewish neighborhood on Coventry transitioned into a more eclectic marketplace. Pioneering entrepreneurs included Kaufman's, Frankel's Jewelry, Irv's Deli, Heights Art Theatre, Allen Lock & Key, A-Appliance, Dobama Theatre, Arabica Coffeehouse, Renaissance Parlour, Generation Gap, High Tide Rock Bottom, Tommy's Restaurant, Mac's Paper Backs, and Big Fun (now closed).

Music venue Grog Shop has been a mainstay in the neighborhood, opening in 1992 on Coventry Road before moving to its current location at Euclid Heights Boulevard in 2003. Grog Shop has hosted musicians and comedians such as Elliott Smith, Oasis, Dinosaur Jr., Yeah Yeah Yeahs, Sleater-Kinney, Jonathan Richman, Slint, Built to Spill, Wiz Khalifa, Le Tigre, and Whitest Kids U Know.
