= Duck test =

Classification based on observable evidence

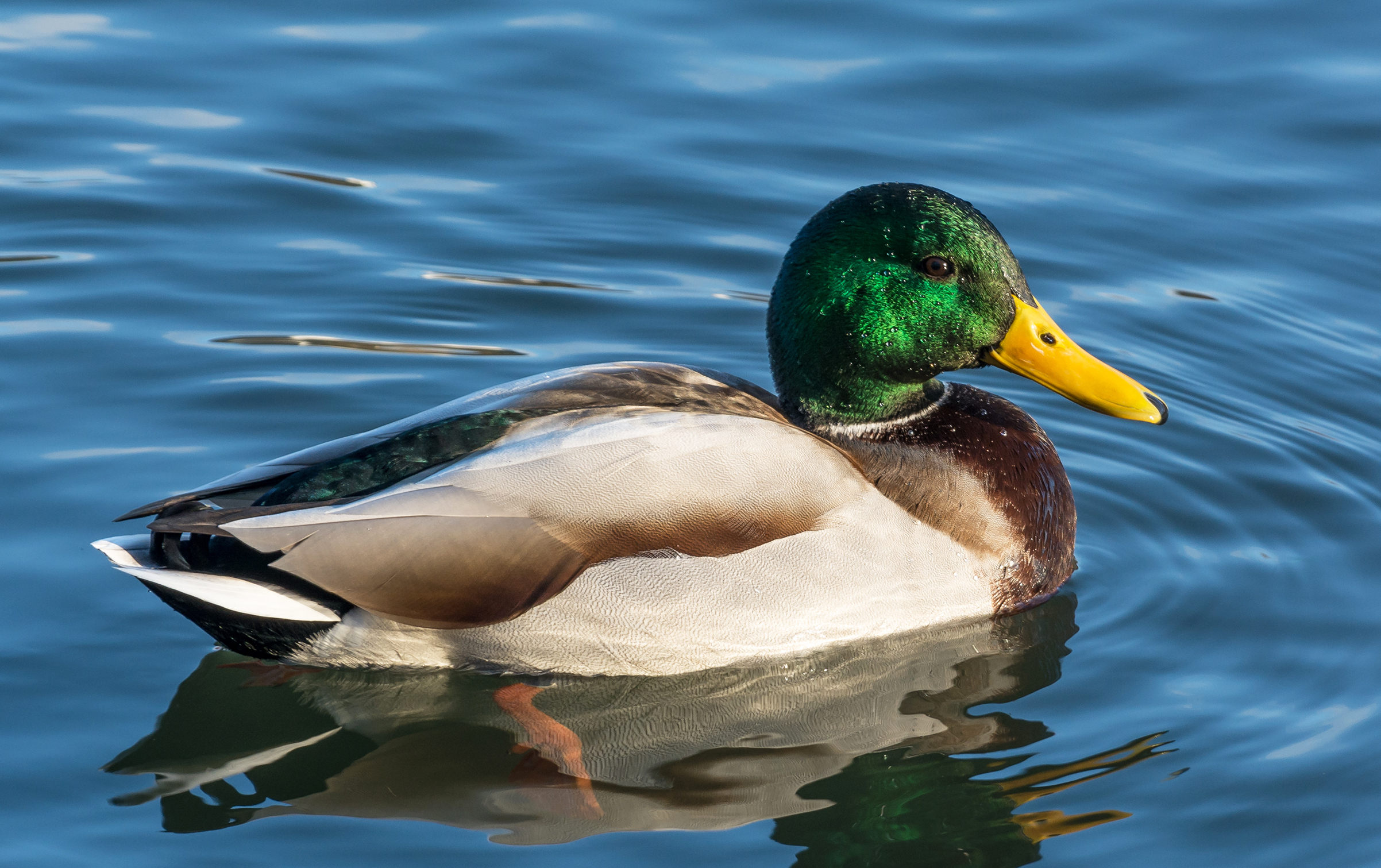
A mallard, shown looking like a duck and swimming like a duck

The duck test is a frequently cited colloquial example of abductive reasoning. Its usual expression is:

If it looks like a duck, swims like a duck, and quacks like a duck, then it probably is a duck.

The test implies that a person can identify an unknown subject by observing that subject's habitual characteristics. It is sometimes used to counter abstract arguments that something might not be what it appears to be.

== Notable uses ==
Indiana poet James Whitcomb Riley (1849–1916) may have coined the phrase when he wrote:

When I see a bird that walks like a duck and swims like a duck and quacks like a duck, I call that bird a duck.

A common variation of the wording of the phrase may have originated much later with Emil Mazey, secretary-treasurer of the United Auto Workers, at a labor meeting in 1946 accusing a person of being a communist:

I can't prove you are a Communist. But when I see a bird that quacks like a duck, walks like a duck, has feathers and webbed feet and associates with ducks—I'm certainly going to assume that he is a duck.

The term was later popularized in the United States by Richard Cunningham Patterson Jr., United States ambassador to Guatemala in 1950 during the Cold War, who used the phrase when he accused Guatemala's Jacobo Arbenz Guzmán government of being Communist. Patterson explained his reasoning as follows:

Suppose you see a bird walking around in a farm yard. This bird has no label that says 'duck'. But the bird certainly looks like a duck. Also, he goes to the pond and you notice that he swims like a duck. Then he opens his beak and quacks like a duck. Well, by this time you have probably reached the conclusion that the bird is a duck, whether he's wearing a label or not.

A female mallard, quacking like a duck

Later references to the duck test include Cardinal Richard Cushing's, who used the phrase in 1964 in reference to Fidel Castro.

Douglas Adams parodied this test in his book Dirk Gently's Holistic Detective Agency:

If it looks like a duck, and quacks like a duck, we have at least to consider the possibility that we have a small aquatic bird of the family Anatidae on our hands.

Monty Python referenced the test in the Witch Logic scene in their 1975 film Monty Python and the Holy Grail, where a mob of villagers reason that because witches burn, they must be made of wood, which floats in water, and since ducks also float in water:

Villagers: "If she weighs the same as a duck, she's made of wood..."
Bedevere: "and therefore..."
Villagers: "a witch!"

In 2015, a variation of the duck test was applied in the revocation of tax exempt "nonprofit" status to Blue Shield of California:

In a startling blow to one of California's biggest health insurers, the state has revoked the tax-exempt status of Blue Shield of California, forcing the company to pay tens of millions of dollars in back taxes and unleashing a torrent of calls for it to return billions of dollars to customers. The tax board's action 'was an acknowledgment of what Blue Shield was already doing, or not doing,' said Anthony Wright, head of Health Access California, a consumer advocacy group. 'And if it looks like a duck and talks like a duck, it should be taxed like a duck.

The Liskov substitution principle in computer science is sometimes expressed as a counter-example to the duck test:

If it looks like a duck and quacks like a duck but it needs batteries, you probably have the wrong abstraction.

Russian Minister of Foreign Affairs Sergey Lavrov used a version of the duck test in 2015 in response to allegations that Russian airstrikes in Syria were not targeting terrorist groups, primarily ISIS, but rather West-supported groups such as the Free Syrian Army. When asked to elaborate his definition of 'terrorist groups', he replied:

If it looks like a terrorist, if it acts like a terrorist, if it walks like a terrorist, if it fights like a terrorist, it's a terrorist, right?

The philosopher Slavoj Žižek frequently references the Marx Brothers' rewording of the duck test in Duck Soup: "He may look like an idiot and talk like an idiot, but don't let that fool you. He really is an idiot." The humorousness of this line lies in its violation of an expected opposite.

== Elephant test ==
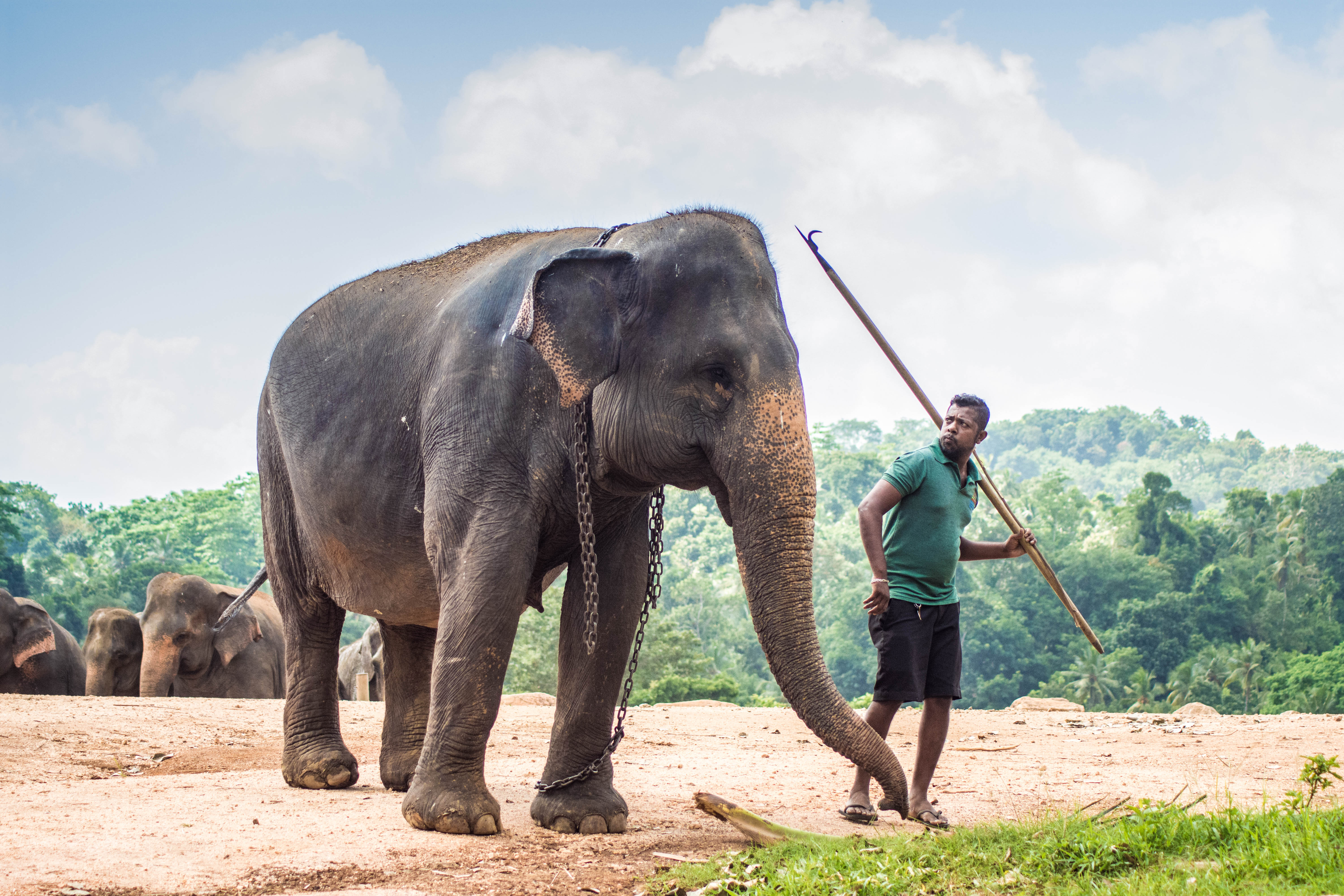
"Hard to describe, but instantly recognizable when spotted"

Similarly, the term elephant test refers to situations in which an idea or thing, "is hard to describe, but instantly recognizable when spotted".

The term is often used in legal cases when there is an issue which may be open to interpretation, such as in the case of Cadogan Estates Ltd v Morris, when Lord Justice Stuart-Smith referred to "the well known elephant test. It is difficult to describe, but you know it when you see it", and in Ivey v Genting Casinos, when Lord Hughes (in discussing dishonesty) opined "like the elephant, it is characterised more by recognition when encountered than by definition." Overruling in part R v Ghosh.

A similar incantation (used however as a rule of exclusion) was invoked by the concurring opinion of Justice Potter Stewart in Jacobellis v. Ohio, 378 U.S. 184 (1964), an obscenity case. He stated that the Constitution protected all obscenity except "hard-core pornography". Stewart opined, "I shall not today attempt further to define the kinds of material I understand to be embraced within that shorthand description; and perhaps I could never succeed in intelligibly doing so. But I know it when I see it, and the motion picture involved in this case is not that."

== See also ==
- Call a spade a spade – Figurative expression
- Duck typing – Style of dynamic typing in object-oriented programming
- Extensionality – Logic principle
- I know it when I see it – United States obscenity law expression
- Identity of indiscernibles – Impossibility for separate objects to have all their properties in common
- Inductive reasoning – Method of logical reasoning
- Operational definition – Defining a concept in terms of specific, replicable actions or procedures
- Philosophical razor – Principle that allows one to eliminate unlikely explanations
- Sympathetic magic – Type of magic based on imitation or correspondence
- Zebra (medicine) – Exotic diagnosis in medicine which is usually unnecessary and wrong
