= Commonwealth v. Sharpless =

Obscenity trial in Pennsylvania

Commonwealth v Sharpless (2 Serg & Rawle 91 (Sup. Ct. Penn. 1815) ) was an obscenity trial. It has been described as the first obscenity trial in the United States.

An action was brought by the Commonwealth of Pennsylvania against one Jesse Sharpless and five others in 1815. The item concerned was a painting, exhibited by the defendant for money, that showed "a man in an obscene, impudent, and indecent posture with a woman." The name of the painting has not been preserved. His defense was that the painting was located in his home and not in a public place. He was ultimately found guilty. He appealed, as there was no statute in Pennsylvania against obscenity at the time. The judgement was affirmed, since the prosecution of obscenity was not barred.

The language used in court documents is similar to that used in the charge against Peter Holmes in 1821, for the publication of Memoirs of a Woman of Pleasure. (Com. v. Holmes, 17 Mass. 336)

== Cases cited in ==
- Roth v. United States
- Rosen v. United States
- United States v. 12 200-ft. Reels of Film
