= The Lovers (1958 film) =

- Theatrical release poster
- Directed by: Louis Malle
- Screenplay by: Louise de Vilmorin
- Based on: "Point de Lendemain" by Dominique Vivant
- Starring: Jeanne Moreau; Alain Cuny; Jean-Marc Bory
- Cinematography: Henri Decaë
- Edited by: Léonide Azar
- Music by: Alain Derosnay; Johannes Brahms
- Distributed by: Lux Compagnie Cinématographique de France
- Release dates: 30 September 1958 (Venice); 5 November 1958 (France)
- Running time: 89 minutes
- Country: France
- Language: French

The Lovers (French: Les amants) is a 1958 French drama film directed by Louis Malle which stars Jeanne Moreau, Alain Cuny, and Jean-Marc Bory. Based on the posthumously-published 1876 short story "Point de Lendemain" ("No Tomorrow") by Dominique Vivant (1747–1825), the film concerns a woman involved in adultery who rediscovers human love. The Lovers was Malle's second feature film, made when he was 25 years old. The film was a box-office hit in France when released theatrically, gaining 2,594,160 admissions in France alone. The film was highly controversial when released in the United States for its depiction of allegedly obscene material. At the 1958 Venice Film Festival, the film won the Grand Jury Prize and was nominated for the Golden Lion.

== Plot ==
Jeanne Tournier (Jeanne Moreau) lives with her husband Henri (Alain Cuny) and young daughter, Catherine, in a mansion near Dijon. Her emotionally remote husband is a busy newspaper owner who has little time for his wife, except when he chooses to place demands upon her; often they sleep in separate rooms. Jeanne escapes to Paris regularly where she can spend time with her chic friend Maggy (Judith Magre) and the polo-playing Raoul (José Luis de Vilallonga), Maggy's friend and Jeanne's lover.

Jeanne's constant talk of her two friends leads to Henri demanding that she invite them to dinner and to stay as overnight guests. Jeanne's car, however, breaks down on the day of the dinner party. Because of this, she accepts a lift from a younger man named Bernard (Jean-Marc Bory) and then asks him to drive her home. By the time they get back, Maggy and Raoul have already arrived at the mansion. It transpires that Bernard, an archaeologist, is the son of a friend of Jeanne's husband, and he too is added to the guest list. Jeanne spurns Raoul's advances, claiming that it is too dangerous.

Late at night, Jeanne pours herself a drink and, wearing her nightgown, walks on the gardens outside the mansion. There, she stumbles upon Bernard, who is smitten with her. At first, she wants him to leave her alone, but the two eventually start connecting. The two kiss and end up spending time in a small boat on a nearby river. They then sneak back into the mansion, where he learns of Catherine's existence and later has sex with Jeanne. In the morning, to the surprise of everyone, Jeanne leaves with Bernard, planning to never return. Initially, she has doubts, but ends up committing to spending the rest of her life with him.

== Cast ==
- Jeanne Moreau as Jeanne Tournier
- Jean-Marc Bory as Bernard Dubois-Lambert
- Judith Magre as Maggy Thiebaut-Leroy
- José Luis de Vilallonga as Raoul Flores
- Gaston Modot as Coudray
- Pierre Frag
- Michèle Girardon as the secretary
- Gib Grossac
- Lucienne Hamon as Chantal
- Georgette Lobre as Marthe
- Claude Mansard as Marcelot
- Alain Cuny as Henri Tournier

== Production ==
Filming took place in Bligny-sur-Ouche, in the village square, as well as in Dijon, Lusigny-sur-Ouche, Veuvey-sur-Ouche and Vandenesse-en-Auxois.

== Critical reception ==
John Simon described The Lovers as "undistinguished but sexy".

Critic Pauline Kael wrote that the film was "facile movie-poetry but erotic and beautifully made."

== American obscenity case ==
The film is important in American legal history as it resulted in a court case that questioned the definition of obscenity. A showing of the film at Coventry Village in Cleveland Heights, Ohio resulted in a criminal conviction of the theatre manager for public depiction of obscene material. He appealed his conviction to the United States Supreme Court, which reversed the conviction and ruled that the film was not obscene in its written opinion (Jacobellis v. Ohio). The case resulted in Justice Potter Stewart's famously subjective definition of hard-core pornography: "I know it when I see it." (Stewart did not consider the film to be such.)
