= Stanley v. Georgia =

- Supreme Court of the United States

Argued January 14–15, 1969 Decided April 7, 1969
- Full case name: Robert Eli Stanley v. State of Georgia
- Citations: 394 U.S. 557 (more) 89 S. Ct. 1243; 22 L. Ed. 2d 542
- Argument: Oral argument
- Reargument: Reargument

Case history
- Prior: Stanley v. State, 224 Ga. 259, 161 S.E.2d 309 (1968); probable jurisdiction noted, 393 U.S. 819 (1968).

Holding
- The First Amendment, as applied to the States under the Due Process Clause of the Fourteenth Amendment, prohibits making mere private possession of obscene material a crime. Supreme Court of Georgia reversed.

Court membership
- Chief Justice Earl Warren Associate Justices Hugo Black · William O. Douglas; John M. Harlan II · William J. Brennan Jr. Potter Stewart · Byron White; Abe Fortas · Thurgood Marshall

Case opinions
- Majority: Marshall, joined by Warren, Black, Douglas, Harlan, Fortas
- Concurrence: Black
- Concurrence: Stewart (in result), joined by Brennan, White

Laws applied
- U.S. Const. Amend. I, XIV

Stanley v. Georgia, 394 U.S. 557 (1969), is a landmark decision of the United States Supreme Court that helped to establish an implied "right to privacy" in U.S. law in the form of mere possession of obscene materials.

The home of Robert Eli Stanley, a suspected bookmaker, was searched by police with a federal warrant to seize betting paraphernalia. They found none, but instead seized three reels of pornographic material from a desk drawer in an upstairs bedroom, and later charged Stanley with the possession of obscene materials, a crime under Georgia law. The conviction was upheld by the Supreme Court of Georgia.

In the Supreme Court of the United States, Justice Thurgood Marshall wrote the unanimous opinion that overturned the earlier decision and invalidated all state laws that forbade the private possession of materials judged obscene on the grounds of the First and Fourteenth amendments to the United States Constitution. Justices Potter Stewart, William J. Brennan, and Byron White contributed a joint concurring opinion with a separate opinion having to do with the Fourth Amendment search and seizure provision. Justice Hugo Black also concurred expressing the view that all obscenity laws were unconstitutional.

The case also established an implied right to pornography, but not an absolute right, since in Osborne v. Ohio (1990), the Supreme Court upheld a law which criminalized the possession of child pornography.

== Legal background ==
Prior to the Stanley case, the prevailing precedent was that of Roth v. United States in 1957, where obscene material was determined to be unprotected by the First Amendment right to speech. In Roth, the defendant sent lewd advertisements by mail and sold American Aphrodite, a magazine containing erotic and pornography content.

A California court convicted Roth under state law. He appealed the decision, and the Supreme Court upheld the conviction. In the majority decision, written by Justice Brennan, a new test was created for determining what can be considered obscene. The Hicklin test was used since a ruling in 1857, which the Court abandoned in Roth. Since the ruling in Roth in 1957, many cases in state and federal courts were determined using the case as primary justification.

== Facts ==
Robert Eli Stanley, a resident of Atlanta, Georgia, was a suspected bookmaker. A warrant was granted to search his home. The searching officials did not find evidence of bookmaking, but instead discovered three reels of eight-millimeter film. They watched the films using a projector that they found in Stanley's home, and upon discovering that the films were pornographic, they seized the films as evidence and arrested Robert Stanley for possession of obscene matter, which was illegal by Georgia statute. Stanley was tried and convicted of possession of obscene material. Stanley appealed to the Supreme Court of Georgia, in which the court affirmed the decision of the lower court.

== Ruling ==
The majority opinion was written by Justice Thurgood Marshall, joined by Chief Justice Warren, Justice Douglas, Justice Harlan, and Justice Fortas. In a unanimous ruling, the court reversed the decision of Supreme Court of Georgia and held that "the mere private possession of the obscene matter cannot be constitutionally be made a crime".

Although the defendant presented multiple arguments in his defense, the Court was able to reverse Georgia's decision using just one of them. A distinction was drawn by the Court between public display and private possession of obscenity. Neither Roth nor any other case at the time set a precedent for private possession of obscenity. The Court thus decided to set precedent on this issue in this case. Roth dealt with the mailing and advertising of obscenity. A companion case, Alberts v. California, involved the advertising and sale of obscene materials. All earlier cases were decided with the negative externality of obscenity in mind. They reasoned that members of the public, especially impressionable children, should have a valid expectation to not be inadvertently exposed to obscenity. Public display of obscenity was deemed an "important interest" in Roth. Private possession was not as interesting in the eyes of the Court.

Justice Marshall, wrote in his majority opinion that "If the first amendment means anything...it means that a State has no business telling a man, sitting in his own house, what books he may read, what films he may watch. Our whole constitutional heritage rebels at the thought of giving government the power to control men's minds."

The First Amendment to the U.S. Constitution protects freedom of speech. In Winters v. New York, a notion was established that freedom of speech extended to what an individual possesses and chooses to read. "The Constitution protects the right to receive information and ideas, regardless of their social worth". For this reason, the Court dismissed Georgia's argument that drew a line between communication of ideas and "mere entertainment". Marshall noted that such a line could not be objectively drawn.

The Court argued that the Georgia decision encroached on Stanley's pursuit of happiness. Stanley should have a right to define his own spiritual nature. An individual's First Amendment rights must always be protected, unless there is cause to believe that a certain type of expression may cause significant public harm.

The Court dismissed Georgia in claiming that possession of obscenity necessarily led to "deviant sexual behavior" and "crimes of sexual violence", as there was little empirical evidence supporting the claim. The Court reasoned that primary crime deterrents should be education and punitive measures for violation of the law. Punishment for an act solely as a preventative measure to ensure that another law would not be violated was discouraged. Georgia also claimed that the possession of obscenity was indistinguishable from its distribution. They claimed that it would be impossible to effectively control distribution if possession was permissible. The Court did not agree with the validity of this claim, and further asserted that an individual's First Amendment rights were more important in this case.

By the First Amendment, as applied to the states by the Fourteenth, private possession of obscenity was decided to be legal. The Court noted that this does not affect or change Roth or other cases that deal with public obscenity.

The Warren Court fashioned the right of privacy that is not explicitly said by the constitution. The court established a comprehensive right of the citizens to be let alone by the government.

=== Stewart concurrence ===
Justice Potter Stewart wrote a concurring opinion which Justice William J. Brennan and Justice Byron White joined.

There was also another issue with the Constitutionality of the case, which was not addressed in the majority decision. The films were seized in violation of the Fourth Amendment as applied to the states by the Fourteenth. The Fourth Amendment prohibits the issuance of general warrants to search a person's home. A warrant can only be issued by a judge when there is probable cause. The particular items to be found must be enumerated on the warrant. The search warrant issued was for the seizure of materials in Stanley's home relating to bookmaking. There was no mention of obscene films on the warrant, and so the seizure of the films as evidence was unconstitutional.

General searches and seizures were made unconstitutional because of the prevailing policy during colonial rule of colonial courts issuing writs of assistance directing law enforcement officers to search all of a person's belongings to find anything that is incriminating.

The films and their content were not in "plain view". The record showed that the officers had to play the films on a projector to determine that they violated the Georgia obscenity statute. So the films are not admissible as evidence under the plain view doctrine, which requires that the character of the object is "immediately apparent".

A search warrant cannot be used as a "ticket" to enter private property. Once inside, an officer cannot assume the privileges of a general warrant.

For these reasons, the films are inadmissible as evidence. Stanley made a motion to exercise this Fourth Amendment right during his trial, and the motion was unconstitutionally denied. The Georgia Supreme Court also overlooked this Constitutional violation. The conviction must be reversed.

== Impact ==
Stanley v. Georgia limited the power of the government to police the private possession of obscenity. The majority opinion defended the free and unimpeded acquisition of facts and knowledge, regardless of their apparent social value. The Court reasoned that unless the pornography is presented in a way that creates a negative externality on others, especially minors, no individual can be stopped from owning and viewing pornography in private.

== Subsequent cases ==
- United States v. Thirty-seven Photographs (1971) – Upheld that importation of pornography is illegal
- United States v. Reidel (1971) – Upheld a postal regulation barring the distribution of pornography through the mail
- Paris Adult Theatre I v. Slaton (1973) – Privacy required in Stanley decision is not sufficient for a commercial movie theater
- Osborne v. Ohio (1990) – The Stanley case distinguished, upheld law criminalizing mere possession of child pornography
- Reno v. ACLU (1997) – Upheld legality of distribution of pornography on the Internet
- Ashcroft v. ACLU (2002) – Protected use of "community standards" to identify material unsuitable for minors

== See also ==
- Attorney General's Commission on Pornography (report published July 1986)
- Committee on Obscenity and Film Censorship
- Comstock laws
- Effects of pornography
- List of United States Supreme Court cases, volume 394
- President's Commission on Obscenity and Pornography (1969–1970)
- United States obscenity law
- Anti-pornography movement in the United States
