= United States v. Reidel =

- Supreme Court of the United States

Argued January 20, 1971 Decided May 3, 1971
- Full case name: United States v. Reidel
- Citations: 402 U.S. 351 (more) 91 S. Ct. 1410; 28 L. Ed. 2d 813; 1971 U.S. LEXIS 46

Case history
- Prior: Stanley v. Georgia, Roth v. United States

Court membership
- Chief Justice Warren E. Burger Associate Justices Hugo Black · William O. Douglas; John M. Harlan II · William J. Brennan Jr. Potter Stewart · Byron White; Thurgood Marshall · Harry Blackmun

Case opinions
- Majority: White, joined by Burger, Harlan, Brennan, Stewart, Blackmun
- Concurrence: Harlan
- Concurrence: Marshall
- Dissent: Black, joined by Douglas

United States v. Reidel, 402 U.S. 351 (1971), was a United States Supreme Court case in which the Court held that a postal regulation that banned the sale of adult materials was constitutionally permissible.

== Background ==
At the time of this case, § 1461 of Title 18 prohibited the mailing of any "obscene, lewd, lascivious, indecent, filthy or vile article, matter, thing, device, or substance..." § 1461 provided for fines and/or up to five years imprisonment for first offenders, and up to ten years for later offenses.

Two years earlier, in Stanley v. Georgia (1969), the Court had found a constitutional right to possess pornographic materials.

In 1970, Norman Reidel advertised, sold, and mailed copies of his $1 booklet, The True Facts about Imported Pornography, to adult-identified customers. Reidel was prosecuted under three counts of violating § 1461. The United States District Court for the Central District of California dismissed the case, whereupon the U.S. appealed directly to the Supreme Court.

The Court heard and decided this case along with United States v. Thirty-seven Photographs.

== Opinion of the Court ==
Associate Justice Byron White penned the Court's opinion reversing the district court and finding the postal regulation Constitutional. While individuals still retain a right to possess pornography, as the Court had found in Stanley v. Georgia, the government still had the power to regulate the distribution and sale of obscene materials, as it had found in Roth v. United States (1957).

Justice Hugo Black, joined by Justice William O. Douglas, dissented in both this case and in Thirty-seven Photographs case, arguing that § 1461 was unconstitutional, that the First Amendment to the United States Constitution "denies Congress the power to act as censor".
