= Osborne v. Ohio =

- Supreme Court of the United States

Argued December 5, 1989 Decided April 18, 1990
- Full case name: Clyde Osborne v. State of Ohio
- Citations: 495 U.S. 103 (more) 110 S. Ct. 1691; 109 L. Ed. 2d 98
- Argument: Oral argument

Case history
- Prior: Conviction affirmed by the Ohio Court of Appeals and Ohio Supreme Court. Defendant appealed to the U.S. Supreme Court.
- Subsequent: Statute upheld; case remanded for new trial.

Holding
- The First Amendment allows states to outlaw the mere possession, as distinct from the distribution, of child pornography.

Court membership
- Chief Justice William Rehnquist Associate Justices William J. Brennan Jr. · Byron White; Thurgood Marshall · Harry Blackmun; John P. Stevens · Sandra Day O'Connor; Antonin Scalia · Anthony Kennedy

Case opinions
- Majority: White, joined by Rehnquist, Blackmun, O'Connor, Scalia, Kennedy
- Concurrence: Blackmun
- Dissent: Brennan, joined by Marshall, Stevens

Laws applied
- U.S. Const. amend. I

Osborne v. Ohio, 495 U.S. 103 (1990), is a U.S. Supreme Court case in which the Court held that the First Amendment to the United States Constitution allows states to outlaw the possession, as distinct from the distribution, of child pornography. In doing so, the Court extended the holding of New York v. Ferber, which had upheld laws banning the distribution of child pornography against a similar First Amendment challenge, and distinguished Stanley v. Georgia, which had struck down a Georgia law forbidding the possession of pornography by adults in their own homes. The Court also determined that the Ohio law at issue was not overbroad, relying on a narrowing interpretation of the law the Ohio Supreme Court had adopted in prior proceedings in the case; however, because it was unclear whether the state had proved all the elements of the crime, the Court ordered a new trial.

== Decision ==
The Court held that, with respect to child pornography, the government does not act out of a "paternalistic interest" in regulating a citizen's mind. By outlawing the possession of child pornography, the government seeks to eradicate legitimate harms by diminishing the market for child pornography. These harms include the psychological damage to children—both the children depicted in the pornography, for whom the images produced serve as a permanent record of the abuse, and the children whom potential abusers might lure with such images. "Given the importance of the State's interest in protecting the victims of child pornography, we cannot fault Ohio for attempting to stamp out this vice at all levels in the distribution chain."

Even if the First Amendment did not categorically forbid the government to ban the possession of child pornography, Osborne argued that the Ohio statute under which he was convicted was overbroad. A ban on speech is "overbroad" if it outlaws both prohibited speech as well as a substantial amount of legitimate speech. The statute, as written, banned depictions of nudity, and the Court had previously held that nudity was protected expression. But the Ohio Supreme Court had held that the statute only applied to nudity that "constitutes a lewd exhibition or involves a graphic focus on the genitals, and where the person depicted is neither the child nor the ward of the person charged" with violating it. Furthermore, the Ohio Supreme Court had required that the defendant had to know that the images depicted children before being convicted of possession of child pornography. By narrowing the scope of the statute in these ways, the Ohio Supreme Court had sufficiently tailored the law only to those images most harmful to children.

However, the Court reversed Osborne's conviction because, after reviewing the record of the trial, it observed that the State did not present evidence that the images were "lewd" within the meaning of the statute. Because lewdness was an essential element of the crime, the State had not satisfied its obligation to prove all the elements of the crime beyond a reasonable doubt.

The dissenting opinion, written by Justice Brennan and joined by Justices Marshall and Stevens, argued, "When speech is eloquent and the ideas expressed lofty, it is easy to find restrictions on them invalid. But were the First Amendment limited to such discourse, our freedom would be sterile indeed. Mr. Osborne's pictures may be distasteful, but the Constitution guarantees both his right to possess them privately and his right to avoid punishment under an overbroad law."

== See also ==
- State law (United States)
