= Freedman v. Maryland =

- Supreme Court of the United States

Argued November 19, 1964 Decided March 1, 1965
- Full case name: Freedman v. Maryland
- Citations: 380 U.S. 51 (more) 85 S. Ct. 734; 13 L. Ed. 2d 649; 1965 U.S. LEXIS 1732; 1 Media L. Rep. 1126

Holding
- The Maryland law is unconstitutional, since it provides the danger of unduly suppressing protected expression.

Court membership
- Chief Justice Earl Warren Associate Justices Hugo Black · William O. Douglas; Tom C. Clark · John M. Harlan II; William J. Brennan Jr. · Potter Stewart; Byron White · Arthur Goldberg

Case opinions
- Majority: Brennan, joined by unanimous
- Concurrence: Douglas, joined by Black

Freedman v. Maryland, 380 U.S. 51 (1965), was a United States Supreme Court case that ended government-operated rating boards with a decision that a rating board could only approve a film and had no power to ban a film. The ruling also concluded that a rating board must either approve a film within a reasonable time, or go to court to stop a film from being shown in theatres. Other court cases determined that television stations are federally licensed, so local rating boards have no jurisdiction over films shown on television. When the movie industry set up its own rating system—the Motion Picture Association of America—most state and local boards ceased operating.

== Background ==
Ronald Freedman challenged the law of Maryland that films must be submitted to the Maryland State Board of Censors before being shown in theaters, claiming it unconstitutional; violating freedom of expression granted by the First Amendment.

== Opinion of the Court ==
In a unanimous opinion by Justice Brennan, the Court held that a rating board could only approve a film and had no power to ban a film.

== See also ==
- Film censorship in the United States
- Production Code
- Joseph Burstyn, Inc v. Wilson
