= Jacobellis v. Ohio =

- Supreme Court of the United States

Argued March 26, 1963 Decided June 22, 1964
- Full case name: Nico Jacobellis v. Ohio
- Citations: 378 U.S. 184 (more) 84 S. Ct. 1676; 12 L. Ed. 2d 793; 1964 U.S. LEXIS 822; 28 Ohio Op. 2d 101

Case history
- Prior: Defendant convicted, Court of Common Pleas of Cuyahoga County, Ohio, 6-3-60; affirmed, 175 N.E.2d 123 (Ohio Ct. App. 1961); affirmed, 179 N.E.2d 777 (Ohio 1962); probable jurisdiction noted, 371 U.S. 808 (1962).
- Subsequent: None

Holding
- The First Amendment, as applied through the Fourteenth, protected a movie theater manager from being prosecuted for possessing and showing a film that was not obscene.

Court membership
- Chief Justice Earl Warren Associate Justices Hugo Black · William O. Douglas; Tom C. Clark · John M. Harlan II; William J. Brennan Jr. · Potter Stewart; Byron White · Arthur Goldberg

Case opinions
- Plurality: Brennan, joined by Goldberg
- Concurrence: Black, joined by Douglas
- Concurrence: Stewart
- Concurrence: White
- Dissent: Warren, joined by Clark
- Dissent: Harlan

Laws applied
- U.S. Const. amends. I, XIV; Ohio Rev. Code § 2905.34

Jacobellis v. Ohio, 378 U.S. 184 (1964), was a United States Supreme Court decision handed down in 1964 involving whether the state of Ohio could, consistent with the First Amendment, ban the showing of the Louis Malle film The Lovers (Les Amants), which the state had deemed obscene.

== Background ==
Nico Jacobellis, manager of the Heights Art Theatre in the Coventry Village neighborhood of Cleveland Heights, Ohio, was charged with two counts of possessing and exhibiting an obscene film in [378 U.S. 184, 186] violation of Ohio Revised Code (1963 Supp.), convicted and ordered by a judge of the Cuyahoga County Court of Common Pleas to pay fines of $500 on the first count and $2,000 on the second (equivalent to $27,000 in 2025), or if the fines were not paid, to be incarcerated at the workhouse, for exhibiting the film. Jacobellis' conviction was upheld by the Ohio Court of Appeals and the Supreme Court of Ohio.

== Supreme Court ==
The Supreme Court of the United States reversed the conviction by ruling that the film was not obscene and so was constitutionally protected. However, the Court could not agree as to a rationale, yielding four different opinions from the majority. No opinion, including the two dissenting ones, had the support of more than two justices. The decision was announced by William J. Brennan, but his opinion was joined only by Justice Arthur Goldberg.

Justice Hugo Black, joined by Justice William O. Douglas, reiterated his well-known view that the First Amendment does not permit censorship of any kind. Chief Justice Earl Warren, in dissent, decried the confused state of the Court's obscenity jurisprudence and argued that Ohio's action was consistent with the Court's decision in Roth v. United States and furthered important state interests. Justice John Marshall Harlan II also dissented; he believed that states should have "wide, but not federally unrestricted" power to ban obscene films.

The most famous opinion from Jacobellis, however, was Justice Potter Stewart's concurrence, stating that the Constitution protected all obscenity except "hard-core pornography". He wrote, "I shall not today attempt further to define the kinds of material I understand to be embraced within that shorthand description; and perhaps I could never succeed in intelligibly doing so. But I know it when I see it, and the motion picture involved in this case is not that."

== Subsequent developments ==
The Court's obscenity jurisprudence would remain fragmented until 1973's Miller v. California.

== See also ==
- Elephant test
- List of United States Supreme Court cases, volume 378
