= I know it when I see it =

United States obscenity law expression

The phrase "I know it when I see it" was used in 1964 by United States Supreme Court Justice Potter Stewart to describe his threshold test for obscenity in Jacobellis v. Ohio. In explaining why the material at issue in the case was not obscene under the Roth test, and therefore was protected speech that could not be censored, Stewart wrote:

I shall not today attempt further to define the kinds of material I understand to be embraced within that shorthand description ["hard-core pornography"], and perhaps I could never succeed in intelligibly doing so. But I know it when I see it, and the motion picture involved in this case is not that.

The expression became one of the best-known phrases in the history of the Supreme Court. Though "I know it when I see it" is widely cited as Stewart's test for "obscenity", he did not use the word "obscenity" himself in his short concurrence, but stated that he knew what fit the "shorthand description" of "hard-core pornography" when he saw it.

Stewart's "I know it when I see it" standard was praised as "realistic and gallant" and an example of candor. It has also been criticized as being potentially fallacious, due to individualistic arbitrariness.

== History ==
The rulings of the United States Supreme Court concerning obscenity in the public square have been unusually inconsistent. Though First Amendment free speech protections have always been taken into account, both constitutional interpretationalists and originalists have limited this right to account for public sensibilities. Before Roth v. United States in 1957, common law rules stemming from the 1868 English case R v Hicklin have articulated that anything which "deprave[s] and corrupt[s] those whose minds are open to such immoral influences" was said to be obscene, and therefore banned. The Roth case gave a clearer standard for deciding what constitutes pornography, stating that obscenity is material where the "dominant theme taken as a whole appeals to the prurient interest", and that the "average person, applying contemporary community standards" would disapprove of, reaffirming the 1913 case United States v. Kennerley. This standard allowed for many works to be called obscene, and though the Roth decision acknowledged "all ideas having even the slightest redeeming social importance ... have the full protection of guaranties [sic]", the Justices put public sensibility above the protection of individual rights.

Jacobellis v. Ohio (1964) narrowed the scope of the Roth decision. Justice Potter Stewart, in his concurrence to the majority opinion, created the standard whereby all speech is protected except for "hard-core pornography". As for what, exactly, constitutes hard-core pornography, Stewart said "I shall not today attempt further to define the kinds of material I understand to be embraced within that shorthand description, and perhaps I could never succeed in intelligibly doing so. But I know it when I see it, and the motion picture involved in this case [Louis Malle's The Lovers] is not that."

This was modified in Memoirs v. Massachusetts (1966), in which obscenity was defined as anything patently offensive, appealing to prurient interest, and of no redeeming social value. Still, however, this left the ultimate decision of what constituted obscenity up to the whim of the courts, and did not provide an easily applicable standard for review by the lower courts. This changed in 1973 with Miller v. California. The Miller case established what came to be known as the Miller test, which clearly articulated that three criteria must be met for a work to be legitimately subject to state regulations. The Court recognized the inherent risk in legislating what constitutes obscenity, and necessarily limited the scope of the criteria. The criteria were:

1. whether the average person, applying contemporary community standards, would find that the work, taken as a whole, appeals to the prurient interest;
2. whether the work depicts or describes, in an offensive way, sexual conduct or excretory functions, as specifically defined by applicable state law; and
3. whether the work, taken as a whole, lacks serious literary, artistic, political, or scientific value.

The third criterion pertains to judgment made by "reasonable persons" of the United States as a whole, while the first pertains to that of members of the local community. Due to the larger scope of the third test, it is a more ambiguous criterion than the first two.

In 1981, Stewart said of coining the phrase:

In a way I regret having said what I said about obscenity—that's going to be on my tombstone. When I remember all of the other solid words I've written, I regret a little bit that if I'll be remembered at all, I'll be remembered for that particular phrase.

The mathematician André Weil, paraphrasing A. E. Housman on poetry, used a similar phrase to define number theory in 1974.

== See also ==
- Abductive reasoning – Inference seeking the simplest and most likely explanation
- Case-based reasoning – Process of solving new problems based on the solutions of similar past problems
- Casuistry – Reasoning by extrapolation
- Common knowledge – Statement widely known to be true
- Commonsense reasoning – Branch of artificial intelligence aiming to create AI systems with "common sense"
- Duck test – Classification based on observable evidence
- Family resemblance – Philosophical idea popularized by Ludwig Wittgenstein
- Oracle machine
- Purposeful omission – Leaving out of nonessential details
- Qualia – Instances of subjective experience
- Tacit knowledge – Skills, ideas and experiences
- Waiter Rule – Common belief about true character
