= Potter Stewart =

US Supreme Court justice from 1958 to 1981

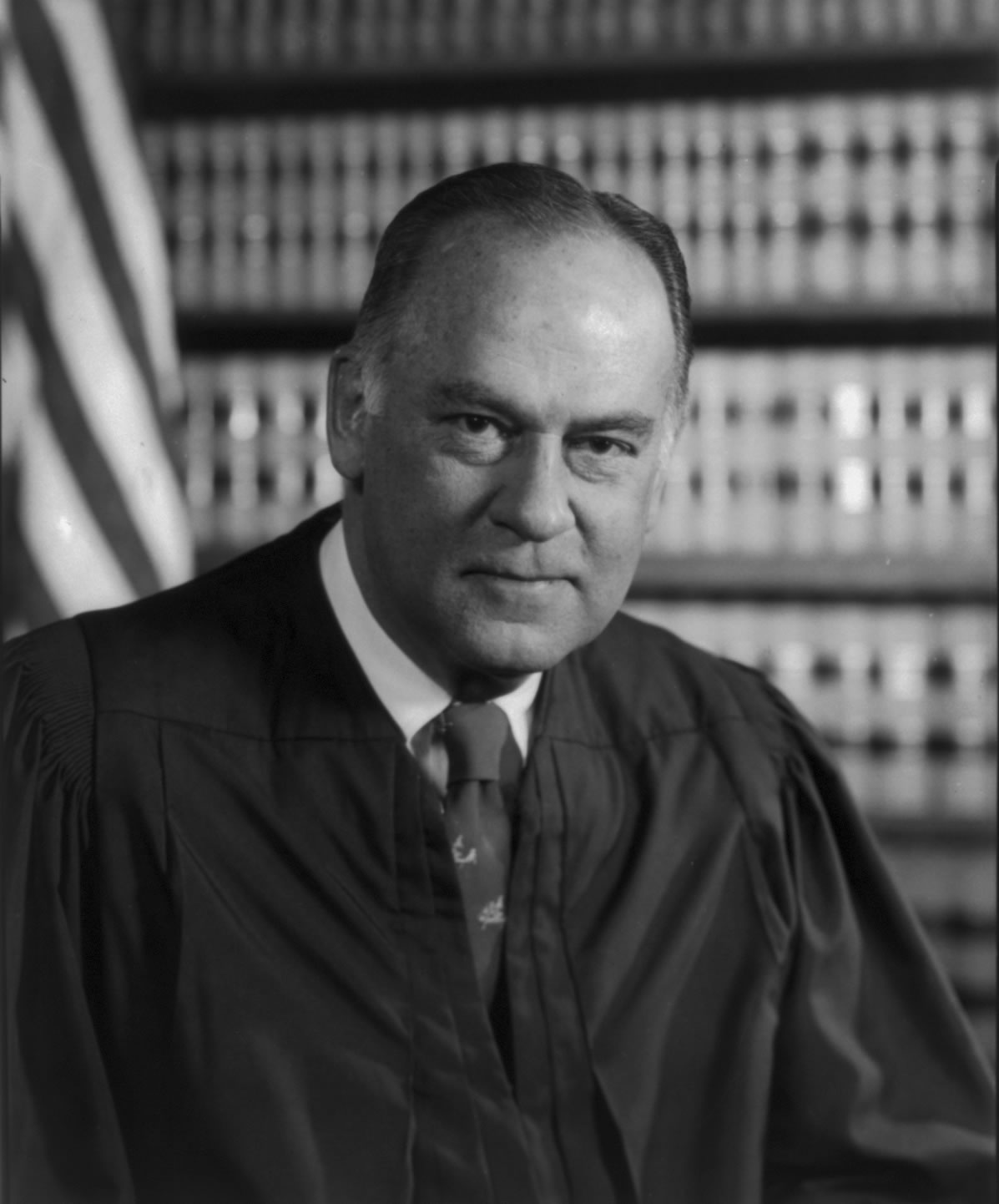
- Official portrait, 1976

Associate Justice of the Supreme Court of the United States
- In office October 14, 1958 – July 3, 1981
- Nominated by: Dwight D. Eisenhower
- Preceded by: Harold H. Burton
- Succeeded by: Sandra Day O'Connor

Judge of the United States Court of Appeals for the Sixth Circuit
- In office April 27, 1954 – October 13, 1958
- Nominated by: Dwight D. Eisenhower
- Preceded by: Xenophon Hicks
- Succeeded by: Lester LeFevre Cecil

Personal details
- Born: January 23, 1915 Jackson, Michigan, U.S.
- Died: December 7, 1985 (aged 70) Hanover, New Hampshire, U.S.
- Resting place: Arlington National Cemetery
- Party: Republican
- Spouse: Mary Ann Bertles (m. 1943)
- Children: 3
- Parent: James Garfield Stewart (father)
- Education: Yale University (BA, LLB); University of Cambridge

Military service
- Allegiance: United States
- Branch/service: United States Navy; Naval Reserve
- Years of service: 1941–1945
- Rank: Lieutenant (junior grade)
- Battles/wars: World War II
- Potter Stewart's voice Potter Stewart delivers the opinion of the Court in Dothard v. Rawlinson; Recorded June 27, 1977

Potter Stewart (January 23, 1915 – December 7, 1985) was an American lawyer and judge who was an associate justice of the United States Supreme Court from 1958 to 1981. During his tenure, he made major contributions to criminal justice reform, civil rights, access to the courts, and Fourth Amendment jurisprudence.

After graduating from Yale Law School in 1941, Stewart served in World War II as a member of the United States Navy Reserve. After the war, he practiced law and served on the Cincinnati city council. In 1954, President Dwight D. Eisenhower appointed Stewart to a judgeship on the U.S. Court of Appeals for the Sixth Circuit. In 1958, Eisenhower nominated Stewart, as a recess appointment, to succeed retiring Associate Justice Harold Hitz Burton, and Stewart won Senate confirmation afterwards. He was frequently in the minority during the Warren Court but emerged as a centrist swing vote on the Burger Court. Stewart retired in 1981 and was succeeded by the first female United States Supreme Court justice, Sandra Day O'Connor.

Stewart wrote the majority opinion in cases such as Jones v. Alfred H. Mayer Co., Katz v. United States, Chimel v. California, and Sierra Club v. Morton. He wrote dissenting opinions in cases such as Engel v. Vitale, In re Gault and Griswold v. Connecticut. He popularized the phrase "I know it when I see it" with a concurring opinion in Jacobellis v. Ohio, in which a theater owner had been fined for showing a supposedly obscene film. Upon announcing his retirement in 1981, when asked if he had any regrets from his time on the Court, he humorously lamented "In a way, I regret having once said about obscenity 'I know it when I see it' because I think that's gonna be on my tombstone."

== Early life and education ==
Stewart was born in Jackson, Michigan, on January 23, 1915, while his family was on vacation. He was the son of Harriett L. (Potter) and James Garfield Stewart. His father, a prominent Republican from Cincinnati, Ohio, served as mayor of Cincinnati for nine years and was later a justice of the Ohio Supreme Court.

Stewart earned an academic scholarship to attend the prestigious Hotchkiss School, where he graduated in 1933. He then went on to Yale University, where he was a member of Delta Kappa Epsilon (Phi chapter) and Skull and Bones, graduating Phi Beta Kappa in 1937 with a Bachelor of Arts degree cum laude. He served as chairman of the Yale Daily News. After studying international law at the University of Cambridge in England for a year, Stewart enrolled at Yale Law School where he graduated cum laude in 1941 with a Bachelor of Laws. While at Yale Law School, he was an editor of the Yale Law Journal and a member of Phi Delta Phi. Other members of that era included Gerald R. Ford, Peter H. Dominick, Walter Lord, William Scranton, R. Sargent Shriver, Cyrus R. Vance, and Byron R. White. The last would later become his colleague on the United States Supreme Court.

Stewart served in World War II as a member of the U.S. Naval Reserve aboard oil tankers from 1941 to 1945, attaining the rank of lieutenant junior grade. In 1943, he married Mary Ann Bertles in a ceremony at Bruton Episcopal Church in Williamsburg, Virginia (at which his brother Zeph—also an initiate of Delta Kappa Epsilon and Skull and Bones, and eventually a professor of classics at Harvard—was the best man). They eventually had a daughter: Harriet (Virkstis), and two sons: Potter Jr. and David. He was in private practice with Dinsmore & Shohl in Cincinnati. During the early 1950s, he was elected to the Cincinnati City Council.

== Sixth Circuit service ==
Stewart was nominated by President Dwight D. Eisenhower on April 6, 1954, to a seat on the United States Court of Appeals for the Sixth Circuit vacated by Judge Xenophon Hicks. He was confirmed by the United States Senate on April 23, 1954, and received his commission on April 27, 1954. His service terminated on October 13, 1958, due to his elevation to the Supreme Court of the United States.

== Supreme Court ==
Stewart received a recess appointment from President Eisenhower as an associate justice on the U.S. Supreme Court on October 14, 1958, to succeed Harold Hitz Burton. He took the judicial oath of office that same day. He was formally nominated to the same position by President Eisenhower on January 17, 1959. Public hearings were held before the Senate Judiciary Committee on April 9 and 14, 1959, and the Committee voted on May 5, 1959, to forward his nomination with a favorable report. He was confirmed by the Senate in a 70–17 vote on May 5, 1959. All 17 votes against his confirmation came from Southern Democrats (both senators from Alabama, Arkansas, Georgia, Louisiana, Mississippi, North Carolina, South Carolina and Virginia, plus Spessard Holland of Florida). He served as Circuit Justice for the Sixth Circuit from October 14, 1958, to July 3, 1981, and as Circuit Justice for the Fifth Circuit from October 12, 1971, to January 6, 1972.

Stewart came to a Supreme Court controlled by two warring ideological camps and sat firmly in its center. A case early in his Supreme Court career showing his role as the swing vote during that time is Irvin v. Dowd.

Stewart was temperamentally inclined to moderate, pragmatic positions, but was often in a dissenting posture during his time on the Warren Court. Stewart believed that the majority on the Warren Court had adopted readings of the First Amendment Establishment Clause (Engel v. Vitale (1962), Abington School District v. Schempp (1963)), the Fifth Amendment privilege against self-incrimination (Miranda v. Arizona (1966)), and the Fourteenth Amendment guarantee of Equal Protection with regard to voting rights (Reynolds v. Sims (1964)) that went beyond the framers' intention. In Engel, Stewart found no precedent to remove school sponsored prayer, and in Abington, Stewart refused to strike down the practice of school sponsored Bible reading in public schools; he was the only justice who took this position in both cases. Stewart dissented in Griswold v. Connecticut (1965) on the ground that, while the Connecticut statute barring the use of contraceptives seemed to him an "uncommonly silly law", he could not find a general "Right of Privacy" in the Fourteenth Amendment Due Process Clause.

Before the appointment of Warren Burger as Chief Justice, many speculated that President Richard Nixon would elevate Stewart to the post, some going so far as to call him the front-runner. Stewart, though flattered by the suggestion, did not want again to appear before and expose his family to the Senate confirmation process. He also did not relish the prospect of taking on the administrative responsibilities that were delegated to the Chief Justice. Accordingly, he met privately with the President to ask that his name be removed from consideration.

On the Burger Court, Stewart was seen as a centrist justice and was often influential. He joined the decision in Furman v. Georgia (1972), which invalidated all death penalty laws then in force, and he then joined in the Court's decision four years later, Gregg v. Georgia, which upheld the revised capital punishment legislation adopted in a majority of the states. Despite his earlier dissent in Griswold, Stewart changed his views on the right of privacy and was a key mover behind the Court's decision in Roe v. Wade (1973), which recognized the right to abortion under that right. Stewart opposed the Vietnam War and on a number of occasions urged the Supreme Court to grant certiorari on cases challenging the constitutionality of the war.

Stewart consistently voted against claims of criminal defendants in the area of federal habeas corpus and collateral review. He was concerned about broad interpretations of the Due Process and the Equal Protection Clauses.

He was the lone dissenter in the landmark juvenile law case In re Gault (1967). That case extended to minors the right to be informed of their rights and the right to an attorney, which had been granted to adults in Miranda v. Arizona (1966) and Gideon v. Wainwright (1963), respectively.

In the obscenity case of Jacobellis v. Ohio (1964), Stewart wrote in his short concurrence that "hard-core pornography" was hard to define, but "I know it when I see it, and the motion picture involved in this case is not that." Justice Stewart went on to defend the movie in question (Louis Malle's The Lovers) against further censorship. One commentator opined, "This observation summarizes Stewart's judicial philosophy: particularistic, intuitive, and pragmatic."

Justice Stewart commented about his second thoughts about that quotation in 1981. "In a way I regret having said what I said about obscenity—that's going to be on my tombstone. When I remember all of the other solid words I've written," he said, "I regret a little bit that if I'll be remembered at all I'll be remembered for that particular phrase."

=== Fourth Amendment ===
Before 1967, Fourth Amendment protections were mostly limited to notions of property: possessory geographical locations such as apartments or physical objects.

Stewart's opinion in Katz v. United States established that the Fourth Amendment "protects people, not places." Stewart wrote that the government's installation of a recording device in a public phone booth violated the reasonable expectation of privacy since the government was committing the "seizure" of callers' words. Katz therefore extended the reach of the Fourth Amendment beyond just physical intrusions and would also protect against the seizure of incorporeal words. In addition, the reach of the Amendment was no longer defined solely by property limits but now went as far as a person's reasonable privacy expectation. The Katz case made government wiretapping by both state and federal authorities subject to the Fourth Amendment's warrant requirements.

In Chimel v. California (1969), Stewart wrote an opinion stating that arresting a suspect in his house does not give the police the right to perform a warrantless search of the entire house, only the area surrounding the arrestee.

In Almeida-Sanchez v. United States (1973), Stewart wrote that roving patrols of the United States Border Patrol must have some justifiable reason before stopping a car. They could not stop and search automobiles without probable cause merely because a stop was made within 100 nautical miles (190 km) from the international border.

In Whalen v. Roe (1977), Stewart, in his concurrence, objected to any broad establishment of a right to privacy. He said that prior Court decisions did not "recognize a general interest in freedom from disclosure of private information."

=== Access to courts ===
Justice Stewart was a leader in trying to maintain access to federal courts in civil rights cases. Stewart was one of the strongest dissenters in the trend of denying litigants access to the federal courts.

Stewart wrote the Court's opinions in Sierra Club v. Morton (1972) and United States v. SCRAP (1973), broadly laying out the requirements of standing in federal actions.

=== Civil rights ===
In Jones v. Alfred H. Mayer Co. (1968), Stewart extended the 1866 Civil Rights Act to outlaw private refusals to buy, sell, or lease real or personal property for racially-discriminatory reasons. In 1976, Stewart extended the Act again in Runyon v. McCrary, which states that private schools open to all white students could no longer exclude black children, and all other offers to contract made to the general public were also made subject to the 1866 Act.

In Shuttlesworth v. City of Birmingham (1965), Stewart held for the Court that police could not use an anti-loitering law to keep civil rights workers from standing or demonstrating on a sidewalk.

In a dissenting opinion in Ginzburg v. United States, 383 U.S. 463 (1966), Stewart stated, "Censorship reflects a society's lack of confidence in itself. It is a hallmark of an authoritarian regime."

== Retirement and death ==
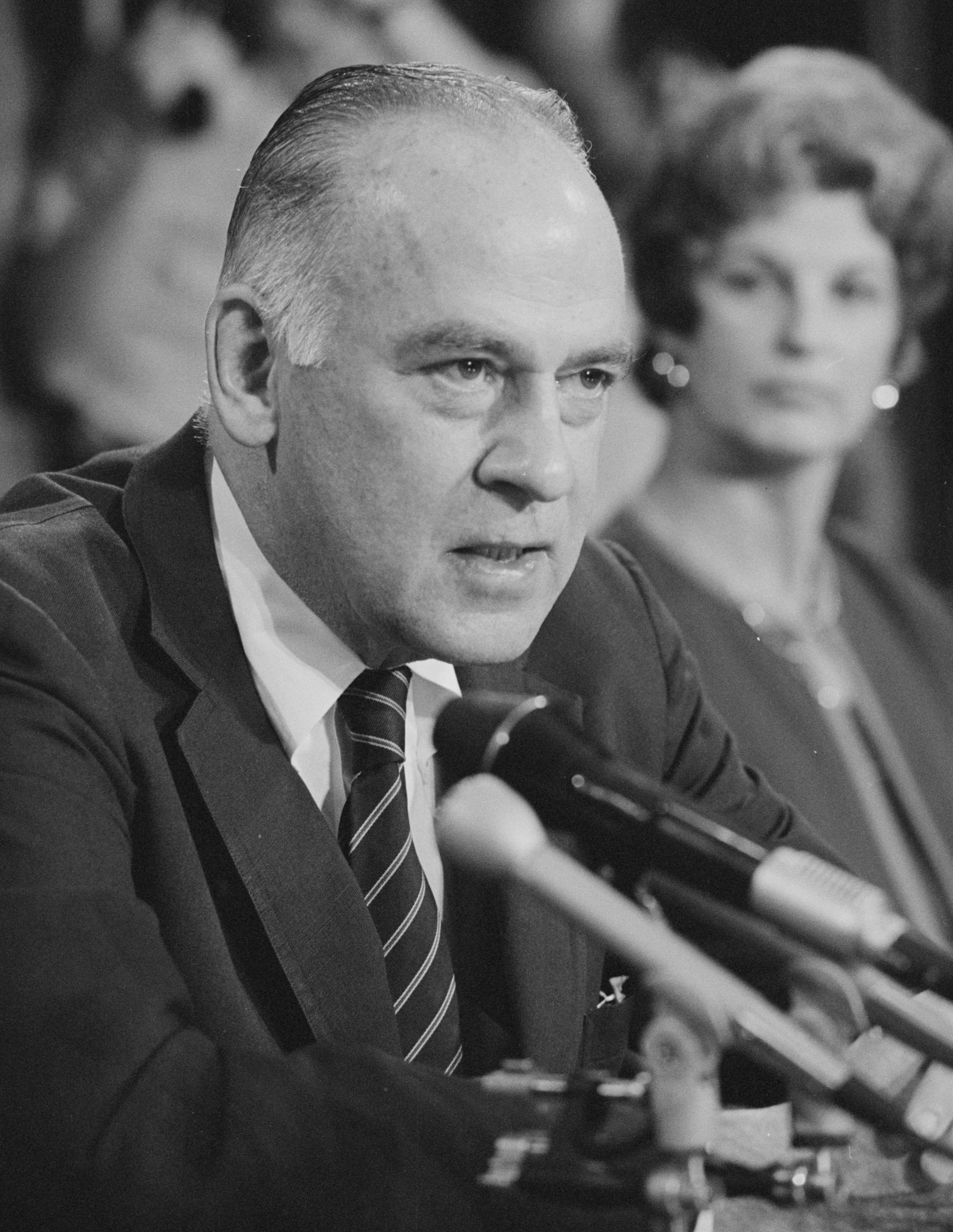
Stewart announcing his retirement in 1981

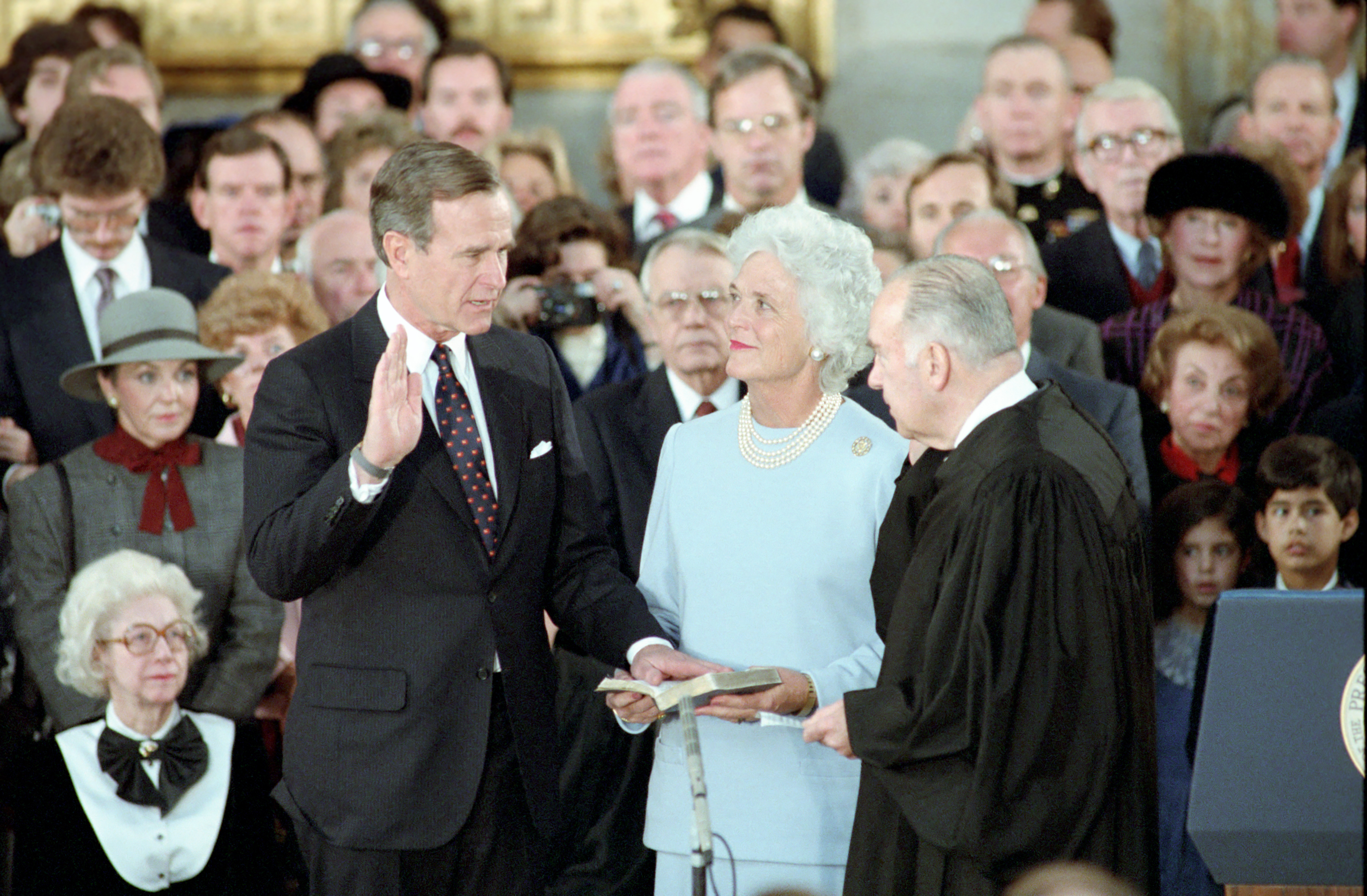
Stewart (right) delivers the Vice Presidential Oath of Office to George H. W. Bush. 1985

Stewart announced his retirement from the Court on June 18, 1981, and stepped down on July 3. President Ronald Reagan nominated Sandra Day O'Connor to succeed Stewart; she would become the first woman to serve on the Supreme Court. He assumed senior status upon retirement, serving in that status until his death on December 7, 1985. After his retirement, he appeared in The Constitution: That Delicate Balance, a 13-episode learning course series broadcast in 1984 about the United States Constitution with Fred W. Friendly.

On January 20 and 21, 1985, Stewart administered the oath of office for Vice President George H. W. Bush. On December 7, 1985, he died from a stroke at a hospital in Hanover, New Hampshire, at the age of 70. He is buried in Arlington National Cemetery.

=== Archives ===
Most of Stewart's personal and official papers are archived at the manuscript Yale University Library in New Haven, Connecticut, where they are now available for research. The files concerning Stewart's service were closed to researchers until all the justices with whom Stewart served had left the court; the last of these was Justice John Paul Stevens, who considered Stewart his judicial hero. Additional papers also exist in other collections.

In 1989, Bob Woodward disclosed that Stewart had been the primary source for The Brethren.

== See also ==
- List of justices of the Supreme Court of the United States
- List of law clerks for the eighth seat of the Supreme Court of the United States
- United States Supreme Court cases during the Burger Court
- United States Supreme Court cases during the Warren Court

Legal offices
Preceded by Xenophon Hicks	Judge of the United States Court of Appeals for the Sixth Circuit; 1954–1958	Succeeded by Lester LeFevre Cecil
Preceded by Harold Hitz Burton	Associate Justice of the Supreme Court of the United States; 1958–1981	Succeeded by Sandra Day O'Connor
