= United States v. $124,700 in U.S. Currency =

2006 US federal court case

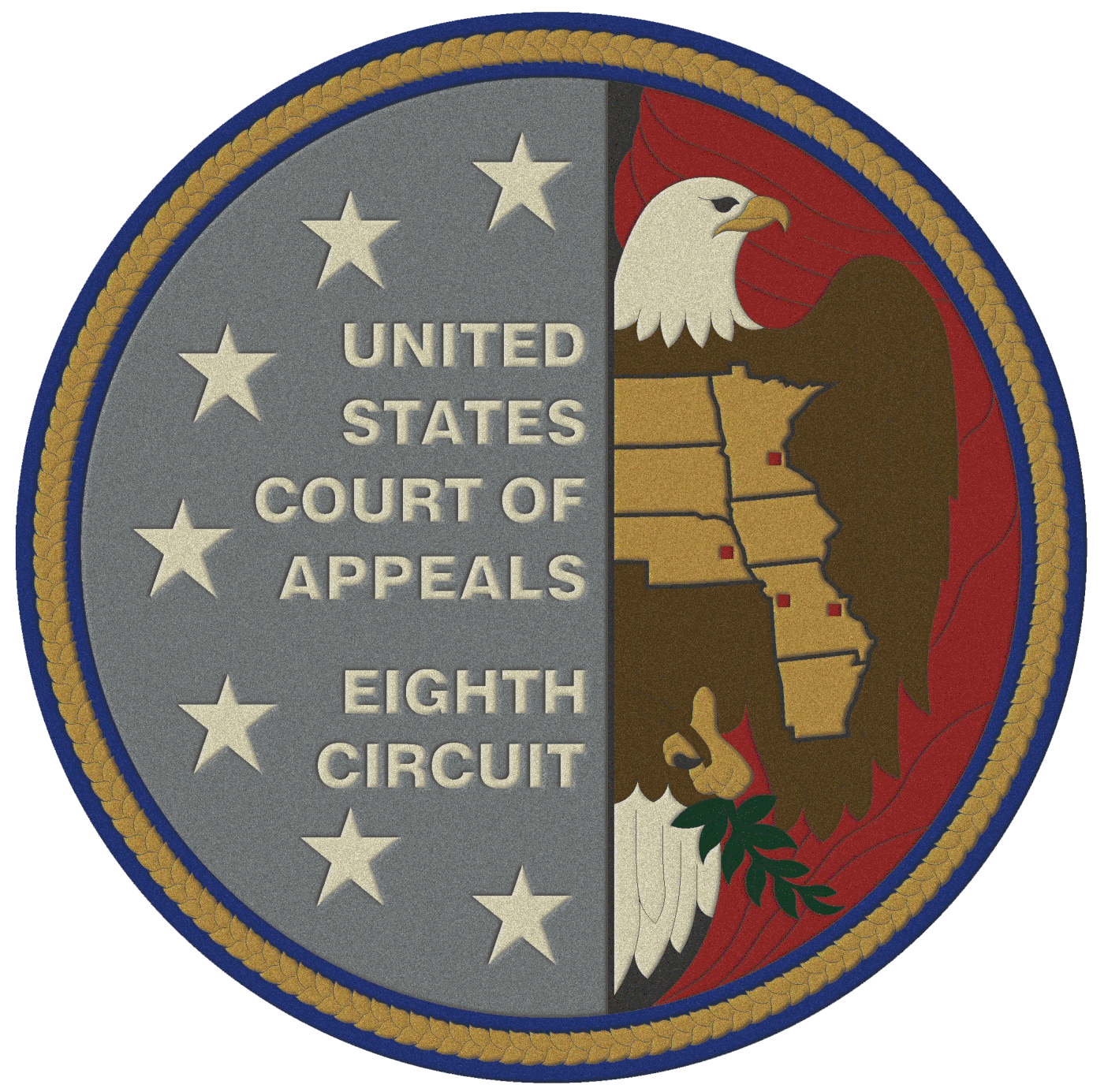
- Court: United States Court of Appeals for the Eighth Circuit
- Full case name: United States of America v. $124,700 in U.S. Currency, et al
- Argued: April 19 2006
- Decided: August 18 2006
- Citation: 458 F.3d 822

Case history
- Prior history: Judgment for the defendant, appeal from the United States District Court for the District of Nebraska

Holding
- Bundling and concealment of large amounts of currency, combined with other suspicious circumstances, supports a connection between money and drug trafficking. A plausible, but unlikely explanation by a claimant fails to show that the currency was not substantially connected to a narcotics offense. Judgment of the district court reversed.

Court membership
- Judges sitting: Steven Colloton, Morris S. Arnold, Donald Pomery Lay

Case opinions
- Majority: Colloton, Arnold
- Dissent: Lay

United States of America v. $124,700 in U.S. Currency, 458 F.3d 822 (8th Cir. 2006), was a decision of the United States Court of Appeals for the Eighth Circuit that was handed down on August 18, 2006.

The form of the styling of this case—the defendant being an object, rather than a legal person—is because this is a jurisdiction in rem (power over objects) case, rather than the more familiar in personam (over persons) case. In current US legal practice, in rem is most widely used in the area of asset forfeiture, frequently in relation to controlled substances offenses. In rem forfeiture cases allow property (in this case, $124,700 in cash) to be directly sued by and forfeited to the government, without either just compensation or the possessor (and presumptive owner) being convicted of a crime.

== Background ==
The defendant currency was seized on May 28, 2003, from one of the claimants, Emiliano Gomez Gonzalez. According to testimony adduced at trial, Gonzalez was driving west on Interstate 80 in a rented Ford Taurus when a Nebraska State Patrol Trooper, Chris Bigsby, stopped Gonzalez for exceeding the posted speed limit. Trooper Bigsby testified that he asked Gonzalez to sit in the front passenger side of his patrol vehicle during the stop. At Bigsby's request, Gonzalez presented a Nevada driver's license and a rental contract for the car, but the rental contract was not in Gonzalez's name and did not list Gonzalez as an additional driver.

Trooper Bigsby did not speak fluent Spanish, but he testified that Gonzalez responded to his questions, which were mostly in English, in a combination of English and Spanish. Bigsby asked Gonzalez where he was going, and Gonzalez responded that he had been in Chicago for three days. Gonzalez indicated that a person named "Luis" had rented the car for him, but the name "Luis" did not match the name on the rental agreement that he presented to Trooper Bigsby. Trooper Bigsby also twice inquired whether Gonzalez had ever been arrested or placed on probation or parole, and Gonzalez said that he had not.

Before Trooper Bigsby had completed the traffic stop, another officer, Jason Brownell, stopped to ask if Bigsby needed any assistance. When Trooper Bigsby found out that Trooper Brownell had some Spanish-speaking ability, Bigsby asked if Brownell would stay and assist. Trooper Bigsby testified that with Brownell's assistance, he completed a warning citation and returned Gonzalez's license and paperwork. Having learned through his dispatcher that Gonzalez had been arrested in 2003 for driving while intoxicated, Bigsby then asked, through Trooper Brownell, if he could "ask a few more questions," and Gonzalez answered yes. Again through Trooper Brownell, Bigsby asked if Gonzalez had ever been arrested for driving while intoxicated, and Gonzalez answered that he had. Bigsby and Brownell also inquired whether any alcohol, guns, marijuana, methamphetamine, heroin, or large amounts of cash were in the car, and Gonzalez answered no. Brownell then asked for and received consent to search the car. Trooper Bigsby went directly to the rear passenger side of the vehicle and opened a cooler that was in the back seat, where he found a large plastic bag that contained seven bundles wrapped in rubber bands inside aluminum foil packaging. These bundles contained a total of $124,700 in currency. Gonzalez and the vehicle were then taken to the Nebraska State Patrol office in Lincoln.

== Lawsuit ==
The district court concluded that the government had not established, by a preponderance of the evidence, that there was a substantial connection between the money and a drug trafficking offense. The court noted that large sums of unexplained currency can be evidence of drug trafficking, and that in this case the money was bundled in an unusual manner. The court also concluded, however, that the claimants had given a "plausible and consistent explanation for [the money's] origin and intended use," (Add. at 12), and that "the bundling is consistent with an attempt to sort the currency by contributor and conceal the currency from would-be thieves," and not just to evade law enforcement. (Id. at 13). In addition, the court observed that the government had not presented any expert testimony about "whether the manner the bundles were wrapped either increased or decreased the likelihood of the currency's use or connection with a drug trafficking offense." (Id.)

== Opinion of the Eighth Circuit Court of Appeals ==
Judge Steven Colloton wrote the majority opinion for himself and Judge Arnold. Colloton wrote, "The United States initiated civil forfeiture proceedings against $124,700 in United States currency, alleging that the money was subject to forfeiture as the proceeds of a drug transaction or as property used to facilitate the possession, transportation, sale, concealment, receipt, or distribution of a controlled substance. See 21 U.S.C.§ 881(a)(6). Three individuals filed claims opposing the forfeiture, and after a bench trial, the district court entered judgment in favor of the claimants. The government appeals, and we reverse and remand for further proceedings."

== Dissenting opinion ==
Senior Circuit Judge Donald P. Lay, a Lyndon B. Johnson appointee to the Eighth Circuit, dissented, concluding "I cannot agree that the government has proven, by a preponderance of the evidence, the requisite substantial connection between the currency and a controlled substance offense."

== See also ==
- United States Court of Appeals for the Eighth Circuit
- List of United States courts of appeals cases
- Asset forfeiture
- War on drugs
- United States v. Approximately 64,695 Pounds of Shark Fins
- United States v. Article Consisting of 50,000 Cardboard Boxes More or Less, Each Containing One Pair of Clacker Balls
- United States v. Forty-Three Gallons of Whiskey
- One 1958 Plymouth Sedan v. Pennsylvania
- South Dakota v. Fifteen Impounded Cats
