= One 1958 Plymouth Sedan v. Pennsylvania =

1965 US Supreme Court case

- Supreme Court of the United States

Argued March 31, 1965 Decided April 29, 1965
- Full case name: One 1958 Plymouth Sedan v. Pennsylvania
- Citations: 380 U.S. 693 (more) 85 S. Ct. 1246; 14 L. Ed. 2d 170

Holding
- Civil forfeiture could not apply when the evidence was illegally obtained.

Court membership
- Chief Justice Earl Warren Associate Justices Hugo Black · William O. Douglas; Tom C. Clark · John M. Harlan II; William J. Brennan Jr. · Potter Stewart; Byron White · Arthur Goldberg

Case opinions
- Majority: Goldberg, joined by Warren, Douglas, Clark, Harlan, Brennan, Stewart, White
- Concurrence: Black

One 1958 Plymouth Sedan v. Pennsylvania, 380 U.S. 693 (1965), was a Supreme Court of the United States case handed down in 1965. The Court ruled that civil forfeiture could not apply where the evidence used to invoke the forfeiture was obtained illegally.

Some police officers followed the suspect vehicle, and pulled over the car because it was "riding low". Without a warrant, they searched the trunk and found untaxed liquor. The car was seized, and the state also attempted to confiscate the automobile in question as a civil penalty. The Court ruled unanimously that the Fourth Amendment's protection against unreasonable searches and seizures, held applicable to the states by the Fourteenth Amendment, applies to civil actions by the states as well as criminal ones, noting that one could be subject to an even worse penalty in a civil proceeding, where the value of the items being forfeited might be more than the maximum possible fine in a criminal case.

The form of the styling of this case—the plaintiff being an object, rather than a legal person—is because this is a jurisdiction in rem (power over objects) case, rather than the more familiar in personam (over persons) case.

== See also ==
- List of United States Supreme Court cases, volume 380
- United States v. Article Consisting of 50,000 Cardboard Boxes More or Less, Each Containing One Pair of Clacker Balls – 1976 American legal decision
- United States v. $124,700 in U.S. Currency – 2006 US federal court case
- United States v. Approximately 64,695 Pounds of Shark Fins – Court appeal concerning shark finning
