= Lion Mark =

Lion Mark may refer to:

- Lion Mark (eggs), British quality standard for eggs
- Lion Mark (toys), British safety and quality standard for toys
