= South Dakota v. Fifteen Impounded Cats =

2010 Supreme Court of South Dakota case

- Court: Supreme Court of South Dakota
- Full case name: South Dakota v. Fifteen Impounded Cats
- Decided: June 23, 2010
- Citations: 785 N.W.2d 272 (2010), 2010 SD 50

Case history
- Appealed from: South Dakota Circuit Court

Case opinions
- Decision by: Chief Justice Gilbertson
- Concurrence: Justice Konekamp, Justice Zinter
- Dissent: Justice Severson, Justice Meierhenry

South Dakota v. Fifteen Impounded Cats, 785 N.W.2d 272 (S.D. 2010), is a 2010 Supreme Court of South Dakota civil forfeiture case brought by the U.S. state of South Dakota against fifteen cats that they had seized on the grounds of interfering with a driver's visibility. The seizure was challenged by the owner of the cats and the court found on a 3–2 majority that the seizure was lawful because of the risk to pedestrians as well as to the cats.

The form of the styling of this case – the defendant being animals (fifteen cats), rather than a legal person – is because this is a jurisdiction in rem (power over objects) case, rather than the more familiar in personam (over persons) case.

== Background ==
On August 13, 2009, a police officer stopped a woman who was driving to Texas as she was reversing out of a parking spot and nearly hit the officer's patrol car. Inside, the policeman found 15 cats as the driver was living in her car. The police officer impounded the cats on the grounds of the poor sanitary conditions in the car, noting a full litter box and a "strong pet odor". After being told of the plan of the state to put the cats up for adoption and denying her the opportunity to take them back, the driver challenged the seizure in court.

== Case ==
The case was originally heard in the South Dakota Circuit Courts. During the hearing, the judge ruled that due to the cats impeding the driver's view out of her car, there were "exigent circumstances" to support the civil forfeiture. The driver then appealed to the South Dakota Supreme Court on the grounds that the seizure violated her constitutional rights, specifically her right to due process and the seizure was done with insufficient evidence. With regard to constitutionality, the driver argued that there was a plain error but the court rejected it on the grounds that plain error would only be applicable if it would create a "ludicrous result" or "...invite ridicule of the entire judicial system". The driver then argued that the seizure was unlawful as the police officer did not have a warrant. The State responded by stating that under SDCL 40–1–5, warrantless seizures were lawful if the animals were injured, diseased, suffering or if there were any other exigent circumstances where a delay would cause suffering. The court ruled that due to the cats being allowed to roam freely in the car while the woman was driving, they could obstruct driver's windows. Accordingly, they ruled there was an exigent circumstance as it might have been a child that was almost hit rather than the officer's car.

The driver had also argued that the evidence was insufficient to support the Circuit Court's ruling as she argued she had kept the cats in humane conditions. However, this was rejected by the court as they did not believe the Circuit Court decision was erroneous. Accordingly, the appeal was rejected by Chief Justice David Gilbertson. Justices Konekamp and Zinter concurred, with Konekamp writing a concurring opinion but arguing that it was due to the risk to the cats themselves that he agreed the seizure was lawful. Justice Severson dissented on the grounds that the "exigent circumstances" definition was too vague and this situation did not meet the standards as the state vet had said that the cats were in good health. Severson also stated that the driver was not charged with any traffic offense and that she should have been, had the State intended to rely on her being unable to operate the vehicle as that was their focus in the seizure hearings. Justice Meierhenry concurred with the obiter dicta dissent. The case was later cited as precedent in South Dakota state law.
