= In rem jurisdiction =

Legal power a court has over property

In law, in rem jurisdiction (Law Latin for "power about or against 'the thing'") is a legal term referring to the power a court may exercise over property (either real or personal) or a "status" against a person over whom the court does not have in personam jurisdiction. Jurisdiction in rem assumes the property or status is the primary object of the action, rather than personal liabilities not necessarily associated with the property.

== United States ==
Within the U.S. federal court system, jurisdiction in rem typically refers to the power a federal court may exercise over large items of immoveable property, or real property, located within the court's jurisdiction. The most frequent circumstance in which this occurs in the Anglo-American legal system is when a suit is brought in admiralty law against a vessel to satisfy debts arising from the operation or use of that vessel.

Within the American state court systems, jurisdiction in rem may refer to the power the state court may exercise over real property or personal property or a person's marital status. State courts have the power to determine legal ownership of any real or personal property within the state's boundaries.

A right in rem or a judgment in rem binds the world as opposed to rights and judgments inter partes which only bind those involved in their creation.

Originally, the notion of in rem jurisdiction arose in situations in which property was identified but the owner was unknown. Courts fell into the practice of styling a case not as "John Doe, Unknown owner of (Property)", but as just "Ex Parte (property)" or perhaps the awkward "State v. (Property)", usually followed by a notice by publication seeking claimants to title to the property; see examples below. This last style is awkward because in law, only a person may be a party to a judicial proceeding – hence the more common in personam style – and a non-person would at least require a guardian appointed to represent its interests, or those of the unknown owner. To resolve this, courts adopted the legal fiction of "personification of the res," treating the property as the defendant itself. This allows a court to adjudicate the status of the property "against the whole world" without requiring personal jurisdiction over every potential claimant.

The use of this kind of jurisdiction in asset forfeiture cases is controversial because it has been increasingly used in situations where the party in possession is known, which by historical common law standards would make them the presumptive owner, and yet the prosecution and court presumes they are not the owner and proceeds accordingly. This kind of process has been used to seize large sums of cash from persons who are presumed to have obtained the money unlawfully because of the large amount, often in situations where the person could prove they were in lawful possession of it, but were forced to spend more on legal fees to do so than the amount of money forfeited.

=== Examples ===
Some examples of in rem cases:

- United States v. 422 Casks of Wine (1828), an early 19th-century example
- United States v. Forty-Three Gallons of Whiskey (1876), case involving sale of unlicensed alcohol on Indian lands
- United States v. Forty Barrels and Twenty Kegs of Coca-Cola (1916), brought under the Pure Food and Drug Act (1906), rather than against The Coca-Cola Company itself
- United States v. Ninety-Five Barrels Alleged Apple Cider Vinegar (1924) – Early Food and Drug Administration case.
- United States v. One Book Called Ulysses, the landmark 1933 ruling by John M. Woolsey that Ulysses by James Joyce had sufficient literary merit to overcome its obscene portions. Upheld on appeal as United States v. One Book Entitled Ulysses by James Joyce.
- United States v. One Package of Japanese Pessaries, 86 F.2d 737 (2d Cir. 1936), a case involving contraceptives Margaret Sanger attempted to import, heard by the Second Circuit.
- United States v. 11 1/4 Dozen Packages of Articles Labeled in Part Mrs. Moffat's Shoo-Fly Powders for Drunkenness, 40 F.Supp. 208 (W.D.N.Y. 1941)
- Marcus v. Search Warrant, 367 U.S. 717 (1961), full name: Marcus v. Search Warrant of Property at 104 East Tenth Street, Kansas City, Missouri. An unusual in rem case heard by the Supreme Court where the named object was not the seized property but the warrant under which it was seized. Since all the government agents involved were indisputably acting within the law as it stood, the only way for the petitioner to challenge the constitutionality of the seizure was to name the search warrant itself as defendant.
- United States v. One Solid Gold Object in Form of a Rooster, 1962 United States District Court case determining that statues made of gold are legal to own under the Gold Reserve Act
- Quantity of Books v. Kansas, 1964 U.S. Supreme Court case holding seizure of allegedly obscene materials unconstitutional without prior hearing to determine obscenity.
- One 1958 Plymouth Sedan v. Pennsylvania, 380 U.S. 693 (1965), case in which the U.S. Supreme Court held that the exclusionary rule prevents the forfeiture of material seized in cases where the Fourth Amendment was violated.
- Memoirs v. Massachusetts, case involving Fanny Hill, heard by the U.S. Supreme Court in 1966 (full name: A Book Named "John Cleland's Memoirs of a Woman of Pleasure", et al. v. Attorney General of Massachusetts)
- United States v. Thirty-seven Photographs, an obscenity forfeiture case heard by the U.S. Supreme Court in 1971.
- United States v. 12 200-ft. Reels of Film, a case very similar to the above heard by the Supreme Court two years later.
- Nebraska v. One 1970 2-Door Sedan Rambler (Gremlin)
- United States v. Article Consisting of 50,000 Cardboard Boxes More or Less, Each Containing One Pair of Clacker Balls, 413 F. Supp. 1281 (D. Wisc. 1976). Held that the seizure provisions of the Federal Hazardous Substances Act do not violate the Due Process Clause.
- United States v. 50 Acres of Land, 1984 U.S. Supreme Court case involving eminent domain, holding that cost of replacement for taken property does not have to be calculated in its fair market value.
- United States v. One Lucite Ball Containing Lunar Material (One Moon Rock) and One Ten Inch by Fourteen Inch Wooden Plaque (2001)
- R.M.S. Titanic, Inc. v. The Wrecked and Abandoned Vessel, R.M.S. Titanic 286 F.3d 194 (2d Cir., 2002) – here distinguishing between plaintiff (company) and object, of the same name; in full the case also named persons as defendants, and identifies the object more precisely as:
  The Wrecked and Abandoned Vessel, its engines, tackle apparel, appurtenances, cargo, etc., located within one (1) nautical mile of a point located at 41° 43′ 32″ North Latitude and 49° 56′ 49″ West Longitude, believed to be the R.M.S. Titanic, in rem
- United States v. $124,700 in U.S. Currency (2006), an asset forfeiture case based on drug law.
- United States v. Approximately 64,695 Pounds of Shark Fins (9th Cir., 2008). Asset forfeiture case under the Shark Finning Prohibition Act of 2000.
- South Dakota v. Fifteen Impounded Cats 785 N.W.2d 272 (S.D. 2010)
- United States v. One Tyrannosaurus Bataar Skeleton (2013). The case was brought to stop the sale of a dinosaur skeleton that had allegedly been looted from the Gobi Desert in violation of Mongolian law.
- United States v. Four Hundred Fifty (450) Ancient Cuneiform Tablets (2017). The Hobby Lobby smuggling scandal started in 2009 when representatives of the Hobby Lobby chain of craft stores received a large number of clay bullae and tablets originating in the ancient Near East.
- United States v. Rayburn House Office Bldg., Room 2113, Washington, D.C. 20515, 378 U.S. App. D.C. 139, 497 F.3d 654 (2007) (holding that an FBI raid of Congressman William Jennings Jefferson's office violated the Speech or Debate Clause of the Constitution of the United States).

== Canada ==
Canadian examples of in rem tend to involve admiralty law. The Canadian Parliament has exclusive authority to legislate for navigation and shipping under section 91(10) of the Constitution Act, 1867. The Federal Courts Act gives the Federal Court jurisdiction over these matters, and it may be exercised in rem against the ship, aircraft or other property that is the subject of the action, or against any proceeds from its sale that have been paid into court.

The jurisdiction of the Federal Court in admiralty matters applies to all ships and aircraft, regardless if the owners are Canadian, and to claims arising on any naturally or artificially navigable waters, and in the case of salvage, cargo and wrecks found on the shores. Under the Act, the jurisdiction of the Federal Court under section 22 may be exercised in personam as well, except in cases of collisions between ships. In that case, section 43(4) of the Federal Courts Act applies. It states actions may only be commenced in Federal Court if the defendant has a residence or place of business in Canada, the cause of action arose in Canadian waters, or the parties have agreed the Federal Court is to have jurisdiction. This does not apply in counterclaims or actions in which some other action has already been commenced in the Federal Court.

In some of the bases of jurisdiction listed under section 22 of the Act, the right to exercise jurisdiction in rem is limited to situations in which the beneficial owner of the subject of the action when the matter is commenced was the beneficial owner when the cause of action arose.

Section 43(7) of the Federal Courts Act creates an exception where actions in rem cannot be commenced. The section states no action can be commenced in Canada against any warship, coast-guard ship or police vessel; any ship owned or operated by Canada or a province, or any cargo laden thereon, where the ship is engaged on government service; or any ship owned or operated by a sovereign power other than Canada, or any cargo laden thereon, with respect to any claim where, at the time the claim arises or the action is commenced, the ship is being used exclusively for non-commercial governmental purposes.

A warrant may be issued for the arrest of a foreign ship, provided the ship is within the territorial jurisdiction of the court.

An action in rem does not necessarily result in a judgment in rem as the owner of the ship may enter a personal appearance and thus submit to the jurisdiction of the court. This is usually the case when the plaintiff threatens to arrest the res and the owner arranges for bail or other security to be given. When the owner enters an appearance the action in rem becomes one in personam and the defendant's liability is not limited to the value of the res or the amount of the bail or security he or she has given. However, a plaintiff, having arrested a vessel, is entitled to security in an amount sufficient to cover the reasonably arguable best case, together with interest and costs, capped at the value of the wrongdoing vessel. The important remedies available from the Federal Court to secure assets pending the resolution of a dispute and to operate in rem may be significant in weighing the suitability of alternative fora in a motion for a stay based on forum non conveniens.

Canadian courts will not entertain actions against foreign ships in Canadian ports that seek to relitigate matters already decided by competent courts, but the authority of Canadian courts to issue maritime liens over ships arrested in Canadian waters will not be affected by orders of Canadian bankruptcy courts directing the proceeds of the sale to be paid to foreign trustees. Canadian courts can exercise discretion to decline jurisdiction over claims for wages where the accredited representative of the state to which the ship belongs objects to the exercise of jurisdiction. The court cannot acquire jurisdiction by consent of the parties if there is an absolute absence of jurisdiction in respect of the subject-matter.

=== Examples ===
Some examples of Canadian in rem cases:

- Baker Carver & Morell Inc. v. “Astoria” [1927] 4 DLR 1022 (Ex. Ct.)
- "D.C. Whitney" v The St Clair Navigation Co [1907] 38 SCR 303
- Pakistan National Shipping Corp. v. Canada [1997] 3 FC 601
- Caterpillar Overseas SA v. “Canmar Victory” [1998] FCJ No 1186
- United Nations v. Atlantic Seaways Corp [1979] 2 FC 541

== China ==
According to Professor Jianfu Chen of La Trobe University, "officially, the drafting of the 2007 Law of Rights in rem started in 1993, ... [but] rights in rem have always been part of the effort to draft a civil code in the PRC." "Rights in rem are defined to mean the rights by the right-holder to directly and exclusively control specific things (property); it includes ownership rights, usufruct and security interests in property."

== See also ==
- Civil forfeiture in the United States
- Jus ad rem, a term in civil law meaning "a right to a thing", distinguished from jus in re, which is dominion over a thing as against all persons.
- Canadian maritime law
