= Marcus v. Search Warrant =

- Supreme Court of the United States

Argued March 30, 1961 Decided June 19, 1961
- Full case name: Marcus v. Search Warrant of Property at 104 East Tenth Street, Kansas City, Missouri
- Docket no.: 60-225
- Citations: 367 U.S. 717 (more) 81 S. Ct. 1708; 6 L. Ed. 2d 1127
- Argument: Oral argument
- Opinion announcement: Opinion announcement

Case history
- Prior: Forfeiture ordered, Jackson County Circuit Court, unreported; affirmed, Missouri Supreme Court, 334 S. W. 2d 119

Holding
- Where material to be seized may be protected by First Amendment, search warrant must be as specific as possible as to items to be seized; seizure itself must be limited only to items enumerated in warrant. Missouri Supreme Court reversed and remanded.

Court membership
- Chief Justice Earl Warren Associate Justices Hugo Black · Felix Frankfurter; William O. Douglas · Tom C. Clark; John M. Harlan II · William J. Brennan Jr. Charles E. Whittaker · Potter Stewart

Case opinions
- Majority: Brennan
- Concurrence: Black, joined by Douglas

Laws applied
- U.S. Const. Amds. I, IV and XIV

Marcus v. Search Warrant, 367 U.S. 717 (1961), full title Marcus v. Search Warrant of Property at 104 East Tenth Street, Kansas City, Missouri, is an in rem case decided by the United States Supreme Court on the seizure of obscene materials. The Court unanimously overturned a Missouri Supreme Court decision upholding the forfeiture of hundreds of magazines confiscated from a Kansas City wholesaler. It held that both Missouri's procedures for the seizure of allegedly obscene material and the execution of the warrant itself violated the Fourth and Fourteenth amendments' prohibitions on search and seizure without due process. Those violations, in turn, threatened the rights protected by the First Amendment.

The case had begun in 1957, when the Kansas City Police Department vice squad raided the warehouse of a local news distributor and five newsstands. Officers seized dozens of publications, far beyond those which had started the investigation, since the search warrants were not specific. Less than half of the seized titles were ultimately found obscene and ordered to be burned.

Justice William Brennan wrote for the Court. He found the officers' conduct similar to that which had inspired the Founding Fathers to write the Fourth Amendment. He added that the Missouri Supreme Court had incorrectly applied an earlier Court holding in sustaining the forfeiture. The result was a system that operated as an effective prior restraint. Hugo Black, in a concurring opinion, joined by William O. Douglas restated his conviction that the Fourteenth Amendment applies all the rights protected by the Constitution to the states.

Marcus broke ground in holding that First Amendment interests required an additional layer of procedure than other instances of seizure. It would figure prominently in later obscenity cases involving seizures, including one called Quantity of Books v. Kansas, that explicitly tried to take its holding into account. After the Court settled on a definition of obscenity in the early 1970s, it continued to hear other cases on the issues first addressed in Marcus.

== Background of the case ==
For most of American history, literary and artistic works depicting or even alluding to sexual acts and topics, or using profane language, had been banned from publication or distribution, often by both confiscation of the works themselves and criminal prosecution of all individuals involved, following the traditions of English common law on obscenity and statutes at the state and federal levels. At the same time, demand for such materials continued, and the laws were often widely flouted. No defendant or claimant in such an action had ever persuaded a court to entertain the argument that the First Amendment's guarantees of free speech and free expression barred them.

That began to change during the 20th century, in response to social and cultural trends of greater tolerance for literature and art that depicted such proscribed material. In the landmark 1933 case United States v. One Book Called Ulysses, Judge John M. Woolsey of the Southern District of New York ruled that James Joyce's novel Ulysses, chapters of which had been held obscene over a decade earlier when published in a literary review, could not be barred from the United States purely on the basis of its language and content without considering its literary merit. Second Circuit judges Learned Hand and Augustus Hand upheld Woolsey on appeal, and the book, considered a masterpiece of modernist literature, could be freely published and sold.

Censorship battles continued in the next decades over other works of literature and art, such as Lady Chatterley's Lover, expanding to include films. In 1957, the Supreme Court finally considered a case arising from an obscenity prosecution, Roth v. United States. William Brennan wrote for a 6–3 majority that upheld the criminal conviction but abandoned the century-old Hicklin test in favor of a narrower definition of obscenity. However, it did not settle the issue, and the Warren Court had to hear more cases arising from subsequent prosecutions in the next decade, during which the Sexual Revolution began a more direct challenge to social mores on the issue.

Criminal trials for obscenity were becoming more frequent and more of a risk for local prosecutors. Civil libertarians rallied around the defendants, creating negative publicity and increasing the chance of acquittals. Convictions were struck down on appeal. Some local authorities decided to combat obscenity through the use of civil forfeiture of obscene material. In civil cases, they had a lower burden of proof, needing to show only by a preponderance of evidence that the material was obscene, with no actual person as a defendant.

== Underlying dispute ==
In October 1957, a Lt. Coughlin of the Kansas City Police Department's (KCPD) vice squad was investigating the distribution of magazines which might have met the state's definition of obscenity. As part of that investigation, he visited the office of Kansas City News Distributors, a wholesaler which sold all types of printed material to newsstands all over the city and its metropolitan area. He showed Homer Smay, the manager, a list of a possibly obscene magazine titles and asked if he distributed any of them; Smay confirmed that the wholesaler distributed all but one.

Coughlin visited five of the newsstands the wholesaler sold to and bought a copy of one of the listed magazines. He then filed affidavits for the newsstands and the main office of Kansas City News Distributors with a Jackson County circuit court judge, who issued search warrants that merely repeated the definition of obscenity in the Missouri statutes and did not list any specific titles nor specify in detail the types of materials to be seized. Two days later, Coughlin and other KCPD officers, with some help from the county sheriff's office, executed the warrants.

At the wholesalers' main office, the officers confiscated not only copies of the titles on Coughlin's list but anything else that at least one thought might be obscene. After three hours of searching through stock including a million copies of magazines, they took 11,000 copies representing 280 separate titles, as well as some books and still photographs. (Note: The seized material was later described as "so-called 'girlie' magazines, nudist magazines, treatises and manuals on sex, photography magazines, cartoon and joke books, and still photographs." (Marcus, 367 U.S. at 723, note 8).) The seized material was transported to the 15th floor of the county courthouse. No arrests were made.

A week later, per statute, the judge held a hearing at which the claimants were allowed to challenge the obscenity findings of the material involved. They made motions to quash the warrant and search as unconstitutional, since there had been no prior hearing and since the officers executing the search had been allowed to seize almost anything. As a result of this argument, the case became an in rem action with the search warrant itself as the defendant, since no unlawful conduct could be argued on the part of the officers or even the state of Missouri itself. Two months later, the judge held the search valid but ordered 180 of the magazine titles returned, as they were not obscene. Copies of the other hundred were ordered to be burned publicly as required by the statute.

An appeal was made to the Missouri Supreme Court. It relied on the recent U.S. Supreme Court decision in Kingsley Books Inc. v. Brown, where a New York statute permitting authorities to obtain an injunction against the sale of any obscene material was upheld, and the Missouri Supreme Court held that the search and seizure was constitutional. The appellants then appealed to the U.S. Supreme Court, which granted certiorari in the fall 1960 term.

== Decision ==
The Court heard oral arguments in March 1961. Sidney Glazer argued for the claimants. Fred Howard, a Missouri assistant attorney general, argued for the state. His superior, Missouri Attorney General Thomas Eagleton, was credited as a coauthor of the state's brief.

In late June, near the end of the term, the Court announced its decision. Unanimously, it had held for the claimants that the search and seizure was unconstitutional. William Brennan wrote a majority opinion. Hugo Black wrote a short concurrence which was joined by William O. Douglas.

=== Opinions ===
"The use by government of the power of search and seizure as an adjunct to a system for the suppression of objectionable publications is not new", Brennan began. "Historically, the struggle for freedom of speech and press in England was bound up with the issue of the scope of the search and seizure power." Citing histories of the former, he traced the beginning of that struggle to the Royal Charter granted the Stationers' Company in the middle of the 16th century, which gave it the power to search printers at pleasure and seize any material that might violate any law or royal proclamation.

This authority continued in various forms, through various bodies, until it was condemned by judicial warrants in the cases brought by the Crown against John Wilkes, publisher of The North Briton, during the 1760s. Those cases culminated in the landmark Entick v Carrington, which the Court itself had called, in Boyd v. United States, "one of the landmarks of English liberty". "This history was, of course, part of the intellectual matrix within which our own constitutional fabric was shaped", Brennan wrote. "The Bill of Rights was fashioned against the background of knowledge that unrestricted power of search and seizure could also be an instrument for stifling liberty of expression."

Having concluded his review of the background history, Brennan turned to the present. "The question here is whether the use by Missouri in this case of the search and seizure power to suppress obscene publications involved abuses inimical to protected expression." While Brennan had held for the Court in Roth that obscenity did not come under the First Amendment's protections, it was a complex issue, since not all material dealing with sex and sexuality was inherently obscene. Thus, the process of suppressing it was necessarily limited by the concern for possibly protected expression, as it had recognized in overturning the criminal conviction of a Los Angeles bookseller under a strict liability standard in Smith v. California.

The Missouri Supreme Court had refused to distinguish between the seizure of obscene material and the seizure of other contraband, such as illegal drugs or gambling implements, also required by law to be destroyed. This Brennan held to be erroneous:

... [T]he use of these warrants implicates questions whether the procedures leading to their issuance and surrounding their execution were adequate to avoid suppression of constitutionally protected publications ... [U]nder the Fourteenth Amendment, a State is not free to adopt whatever procedures it pleases for dealing with obscenity as here involved, without regard to the possible consequences for constitutionally protected speech.

We believe that Missouri's procedures, as applied in this case, lacked the safeguards which due process demands to assure nonobscene material the constitutional protection to which it is entitled. Putting to one side the fact that no opportunity was afforded the appellants to elicit and contest the reasons for the officer's belief, or otherwise to argue against the propriety of the seizure to the issuing judge, still the warrants issued on the strength of the conclusory assertions of a single police officer, without any scrutiny by the judge of any materials considered by the complainant to be obscene. The warrants gave the broadest discretion to the executing officers; they merely repeated the language of the statute and the complaints, specified no publications, and left to the individual judgment of each of the many police officers involved the selection of such magazines as in his view constituted "obscene ... publications."

Nothing better demonstrated that adequate constitutional safeguards were lacking, Brennan noted, than the circuit court's eventual ruling that less than half of the seized magazines were obscene. "Procedures which sweep so broadly and with so little discrimination are obviously deficient in techniques required by the Due Process Clause of the Fourteenth Amendment to prevent erosion of the constitutional guarantees."

Brennan described the lower court's reliance on Kingsley Books as "misplaced". The New York statute had required that a court actually review the material alleged to be obscene and that the injunction be limited to the distribution of the reviewed material. It also mandated a hearing within a day of the injunction and a verdict within two days of the hearing, whereas Missouri's statute imposed no time limit. Nor did the case "support the proposition that the State may impose the extensive restraints imposed here on the distribution of these publications prior to an adversary proceeding on the issue of obscenity, irrespective of whether or not the material is legally obscene" since it had merely allowed the issuance of an injunction against sale of the book, not the seizure and possible destruction of the book.

"[T]he restraint on the circulation of publications [here] was far more thoroughgoing and drastic than any restraint upheld by this Court in Kingsley Books," Brennan concluded. "Mass seizure in the fashion of this case was thus effected without any safeguards to protect legitimate expression. The judgment of the Missouri Supreme Court sustaining the condemnation of the 100 publications therefore cannot be sustained."

Black's short concurrence emphasized the Fourteenth Amendment aspect of the holding, making the provisions of the Fourth Amendment fully applicable to the states as well as the federal government. He expressed that view again, citing dissents to that effect he had either written or joined. (Note: Specifically, he referred to Adamson v. California, 332 U.S. 46, 68, (1947), Black, J., dissenting; Frank v. Maryland, 359 U.S. 360, 374, (1959), Douglas, J., dissenting.) He also felt the Court's then-recent holding in Mapp v. Ohio extending the exclusionary rule to state prosecutions strengthened this view.

== Subsequent jurisprudence ==
Marcus became the first of a line of cases mandating procedural safeguards where allegedly obscene material was seized. Shortly after it was handed down, William M. Ferguson, Attorney General of neighboring Kansas, tried to adapt that state's procedures to the decision. Later, in 1961, lawyers with his office filed informations with some county circuit courts naming specific titles and requesting that the judges in the case actually review copies of the material named. Both went beyond the requirements of Kansas law.

On the basis of those determinations, search warrants were issued. In Junction City, officers seized almost 2,000 copies of the named books from one local distributor. As its Missouri counterpart had, the distributor challenged the obscenity finding in court, which ruled in favor of the state. After an appeal to the Kansas Supreme Court failed, the U.S. Supreme Court heard Quantity of Books v. Kansas in 1963.

Brennan again wrote for a 7–2 majority that reaffirmed and expanded the Marcus holding. The Kansas seizure was unconstitutional as well, the Court said, since it did not provide for an adversary hearing where the distributor could challenge the obscenity allegation prior to seizure. Black, joined by Justice Douglas, in his concurrence reiterated both justices' firm opposition to any government regulation of obscenity; and Justice Potter Stewart concurred separately, finding that the books at issue did not constitute hardcore pornography, the only material he felt was beyond First Amendment protections. In dissent, Justice John Marshall Harlan II wrote for himself and Justice Tom Clark and found the case and procedure more similar to Kingsley Books than Marcus, saying that the Missouri Supreme Court should have been affirmed.

The following year, Brennan again relied on his holdings in both Marcus and Quantity of Books when striking down Maryland's film-licensing system, since it was a purely executive-branch function. "[O]nly a procedure requiring a judicial determination suffices to impose a valid final restraint", he wrote in Freedman v. Maryland. In two later cases similar to Marcus, the Court reaffirmed it as applying to the seizure of allegedly obscene films as well. Lee Art Theatre, Inc. v. Virginia, a 1968 per curiam opinion, did not reach the issue of whether a judicial officer needed to review a film as well as a book but reversed the conviction on the same grounds as Marcus — that the judge simply relied on the investigation officer's affidavit in issuing the warrant. Five years later, Roaden v. Kentucky, similarly built on Marcus to reverse a conviction based on a warrantless seizure of the film while it was being shown, which the Court held did not constitute exigent circumstances.

The Court reached the limits of Marcus in 1985, when it upheld the warrantless arrest and later conviction of a retail store clerk in Macon v. Maryland, since the obscene material was seized incident to a lawful arrest. Justice Sandra Day O'Connor distinguished the case from Marcus and its successors by noting that the arresting officers had obtained the material by purchasing it from racks open to the public, where no reasonable expectation of privacy existed, thus legally no search had occurred. Brennan, in dissent, found the police actions no less intrusive than he had in Marcus and called the holding "an end run around constitutional requirements carefully crafted to guard our liberty of expression."

Outside of the Court's obscenity cases, Brennan also rested his majority holding in NAACP v. Button, reversing the Virginia Supreme Court of Appeals' ruling that the civil rights organization could not solicit litigants, on the dangers to First Amendment rights posed by overbroad statutes recognized by Marcus. Justice Stewart found it more directly applicable when holding for the Court in Stanford v. Texas that allegedly pro-Communist subversive material could not be seized on such a vaguely worded warrant. "No less a standard could be faithful to First Amendment freedoms", he wrote. "The constitutional impossibility of leaving the protection of those freedoms to the whim of the officers charged with executing the warrant is dramatically underscored by what the officers saw fit to seize under the warrant in this case."

=== Appellate courts ===
Even a considerable amount of time since the case was handed down, a few appellate decisions have ventured to expand or clarify Marcus. In a 1981 case, United States v. Espinoza, the Fourth Circuit rejected a defense claim that the holding required judicial review of all material alleged to be obscene. After the Eighth Circuit affirmed Marcus's First Amendment protections extended to searches intended to find indicia of membership in an organization in 1983, the Fifth Circuit held 12 years later that it did not apply to seizures of material with First Amendment implications when that material was sought not for its possible content but to corroborate a witness's testimony. (Note: In that case, one of the daughters of a defendant facing child molestation charges had told investigators of a large stash of child pornography which he showed them while molesting them.)

== See also ==
- List of United States Supreme Court cases, volume 367
- List of United States Supreme Court cases by the Warren Court
- List of United States Supreme Court cases involving the First Amendment
