= Quantity of Books v. Kansas =

- Supreme Court of the United States

Argued April 1–2, 1964 Decided June 22, 1964
- Full case name: A Quantity of Copies of Books et al. v. Kansas
- Citations: 378 U.S. 205 (more) 84 S. Ct. 1723; 12 L. Ed. 2d 809
- Argument: Oral argument
- Opinion announcement: Opinion announcement

Case history
- Prior: Forfeiture granted, Geary District Court, unreported, 1961; order affirmed, 191 Kan. 13, 379 P. 2d 254 (Kansas Supreme Court, 1961)
- Subsequent: cert granted, 388 U.S. 452 (1967), 87 S. Ct. 2104, 18 L. Ed. 2d 1314

Holding
- Mass seizure of allegedly obscene works without prior adversary hearing to determine obscenity was procedurally deficient to protect First Amendment interests. Kansas Supreme Court reversed and remanded.

Court membership
- Chief Justice Earl Warren Associate Justices Hugo Black · William O. Douglas; Tom C. Clark · John M. Harlan II; William J. Brennan Jr. · Potter Stewart; Byron White · Arthur Goldberg

Case opinions
- Majority: Brennan, joined by Warren, White, Goldberg
- Concurrence: Black, joined by Douglas
- Concurrence: Stewart
- Dissent: Harlan, joined by Clark

Laws applied
- U.S. Const. amends. I, XIV

Quantity of Books v. Kansas, 378 U.S. 205 (1964), is an in rem United States Supreme Court decision on First Amendment questions relating to the forfeiture of obscene material. By a 7–2 margin, the Court held that a seizure of the books was unconstitutional, since no hearing had been held on whether the books were obscene, and it reversed a Kansas Supreme Court decision that upheld the seizure.

The case arose several years earlier when police in Junction City, Kansas raided an adult bookstore. The state's Attorney General, William M. Ferguson, had previously filed an information with the county court listing 51 titles published by Nightstand Books as allegedly obscene; at the bookstore, 31 of those titles found, and 1,175 books were seized. These procedures were believed to be in keeping with the Supreme Court's recent Marcus v. Search Warrant decision, which held that some sort of judicial review was necessary to determine if seized material was obscene prior to seizure.

Justice William Brennan wrote for a four-justice plurality that considered the case strictly on procedural grounds, without reaching the question of the books' obscenity. It could, he said, operate as a form of prior restraint. In one of two separate concurrences, Justice Hugo Black reaffirmed his earlier blanket opposition to all legal suppression of obscenity, in which he was joined by William O. Douglas. Justice Potter Stewart said that the books in question were not hardcore pornography, which was the only material that he could consider holding to be unprotected by the First Amendment in Quantity of Books's companion case, Jacobellis v. Ohio (where he had also defined it with his oft-quoted line "I know it when I see it").

In dissent, Justice John Marshall Harlan II wrote for himself and Tom Clark in faulting Brennan's application of the precedents he relied on. He also disputed whether the procedure was truly prior restraint, since it did not review the material prior to publication. The Court, he concluded, was unfairly denying Kansas the full range of legal tools it might otherwise have had to pursue if it had decided it was an important state interest.

== Background ==
For most of American history, literary and artistic works depicting, or even alluding to, sexual acts and topics or using profane language had been banned from publication or distribution, often by both confiscation of the works themselves and criminal prosecution of all individuals involved, following the traditions of English common law on obscenity and statutes at the state and federal levels. At the same time, demand for such materials continued, and the laws were often widely flouted. No defendant or claimant in such an action had ever persuaded a court to entertain the argument that the First Amendment's guarantees of free speech and free expression barred them.

That began to change during the 20th century, in response to social and cultural trends of greater tolerance for literature and art that depicted such proscribed material. In the landmark 1933 case United States v. One Book Called Ulysses, Judge John M. Woolsey of the Southern District of New York ruled that James Joyce's novel Ulysses, chapters of which had been held obscene over a decade earlier when published in a literary review, could not be barred from the United States purely on the basis of its language and content without considering its literary merit. Second Circuit judges Learned and Augustus Hand upheld Woolsey on appeal, and the book, considered a masterpiece of modernist literature, could be freely published and sold.

Censorship battles continued in the next decades over other works of literature and art, such as Lady Chatterley's Lover, expanding to include films. In 1957, the Supreme Court finally considered a case arising from an obscenity prosecution, Roth v. United States. Justice William Brennan wrote for a 6–3 majority that upheld the criminal conviction but abandoned the century-old Hicklin test in favor of a narrower definition of obscenity. It did not settle the issue, however, and the Warren Court had to hear more cases arising from subsequent prosecutions in the next decade, during which the Sexual Revolution began a more direct challenge to social mores on the issue.

Some of those cases did not implicate the issue of obscenity itself but the procedures that were used to suppress it. In 1961, the Court had heard Marcus v. Search Warrant, in which several bookstores in Kansas City, Missouri, had challenged the seizure of some of their wares prior to any hearing at which they could contest the finding of obscenity. The Court had unanimously found this procedure violated the Fourth and Fourteenth Amendments, since there were First Amendment interests at stake in obscenity prosecutions that were not present in other forfeiture cases.

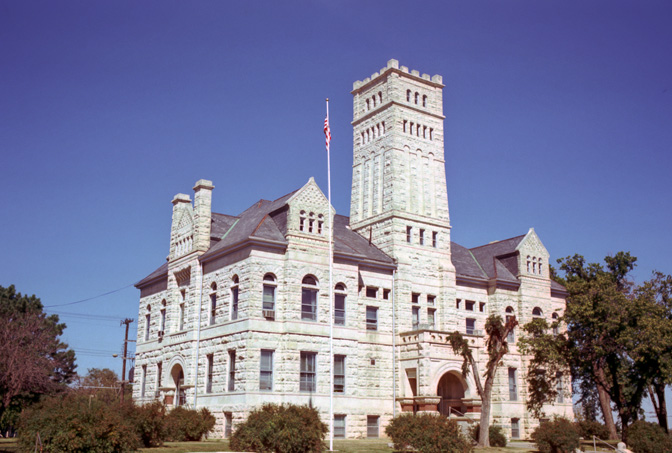
Geary County Courthouse

In 1961, shortly after Marcus, William M. Ferguson, Kansas's Attorney General, filed an information in Geary County district court naming 59 titles, all bearing the subhead, "This is an original Night-Stand Book", a level of detail greater than that required by Kansas's anti-obscenity statutes. He included, as evidence, copies of seven titles, six of which had paper bookmarks marking the location of passages, that were circled in pencil, that violated the law. The judge also went beyond statutory requirements, conducting a 45-minute ex parte reading in his chambers, at the conclusion of which he agreed that the books were probably obscene under Kansas law. All these extra procedures were seen by the attorney general as necessary in light of Marcus.

The judge issued a warrant to be served by the county sheriff's office. It was strictly limited to the 59 titles named by the Attorney General. On the same day, deputies served the warrant at P–K News Service in Junction City, the county seat. They found copies of 31 of the listed books offered for sale and seized 1,715 copies in all. No employees or customers were arrested.

A hearing was held ten days later where P–K could argue that the books were not obscene. Since there were no criminal charges involved, it was strictly a civil forfeiture action, held under in rem jurisdiction with the seized books themselves as defendants. P–K moved to have the information and the warrant quashed on the grounds that, since they had not been afforded a hearing on the obscenity question prior to the seizure, their constitutional rights had been violated. They argued that, as it was, the seizure was "a prior restraint on the circulation and dissemination of books".

The motion was denied, and the court ordered the books destroyed. The bookstore appealed to the Kansas Supreme Court, which upheld the order. The U.S. Supreme Court granted certiorari in 1963.

== Opinion of the Court ==
Oral arguments were held over a two-day period in April 1964. Stanley Fleishman argued for the claimants; Ferguson for the state. He was joined in an amicus curiae brief by 19 other state attorneys general.

The Court announced its decision in late June of that year, near the end of its term. Justice William Brennan wrote for four of the seven justices in the majority, including Chief Justice Earl Warren. Justice Hugo Black wrote a separate concurrence, joined by William O. Douglas, and Potter Stewart wrote briefly for himself. Justice John Marshall Harlan II wrote for himself and fellow dissenter Tom Clark.

=== Plurality ===
"[S]ince the warrant here authorized the sheriff to seize all copies of the specified titles, and since P-K was not afforded a hearing on the question of the obscenity even of the seven novels before the warrant issued," Brennan wrote, "the procedure was likewise constitutionally deficient." He relied on both Marcus and Kingsley Books Inc. v. Brown, a 1957 case in which a bookstore had unsuccessfully challenged a statute allowing the state to obtain a temporary injunction against the sale of allegedly obscene material. Missouri officials in Marcus had argued that decision gave them the authority to take the action they did, but the Court had rejected it. Nor would it apply here. "A seizure of all copies of the named titles is indeed more repressive than an injunction preventing further sale of the books."

After quoting at length from Marcus, Brennan rejected another argument that had also been raised in that case. "It is no answer to say that obscene books are contraband, and that, consequently, the standards governing searches and seizures of allegedly obscene books should not differ from those applied with respect to narcotics, gambling paraphernalia and other contraband." The mere act of holding an adversary hearing did not make the seizure constitutional, since the relevant fact was not that P–K was allowed to contest the seizure, but that it was not allowed to do so before the seizure. "For if seizure of books precedes an adversary determination of their obscenity, there is danger of abridgment of the right of the public in a free society to unobstructed circulation of nonobscene books."

=== Concurrences ===
Justice Black wrote, in his short concurrence, that it was unnecessary to decide the procedural questions since, as he and Justice Douglas had also said in his Roth dissent and several others since, "the Kansas statute ordering the burning of these books is in plain violation of the unequivocal prohibition of the First Amendment, made applicable to the States by the Fourteenth, against 'abridging the freedom of speech, or of the press.'" Stewart alluded to his concurring opinion in Jacobellis v. Ohio, Quantity of Books's companion case, where he had said that only "hardcore pornography", which he memorably declined to define beyond "I know it when I see it", was beyond First Amendment protection. In this case, "the books here involved were not hard core pornography. Therefore, I think Kansas could not by any procedure constitutionally suppress them, any more than Kansas could constitutionally make their sale or distribution a criminal act."

=== Dissent ===
Justice Harlan's dissent was longer than all three of the other opinions combined. He first responded to Justices Black, Douglas and Stewart that "[i]t is quite plain that these so-called 'novels' have 'been reasonably found in state judicial proceedings to treat with sex in a fundamentally offensive manner,' and that the State's criteria for judging their obscenity are rational." Then, he began a longer critique of Brennan's holding that the seizure and forfeiture proceedings had been unconstitutional.

The instant case, Justice Harlan believed, had more similarities to Kingsley Books than Marcus. He pointed to the extensive review by the judge before he granted the warrant, as well as its limitations to only the titles named in it, two controls which had been absent in Marcus and were specifically imposed by Ferguson in response to the later decision. The New York statute upheld in Kingsley Books had allowed for an almost immediate hearing after the granting of the injunction, but he considered it unlikely that any defendant or claimant would be able to prepare a defense that quickly. "In pragmatic terms, then, the nature of the restraint imposed by the Kansas statute is not in a constitutionally significant sense different from that sustained in Kingsley Books."

Brennan had been incorrect, Justice Harlan stated, to consider the Kansas statute as effectively constituting prior restraint merely due to the lack of a prior adversary hearing.

In the typical censorship situation, material is brought as a matter of course before some administrative authority, who then decides on its propriety. This means that the State establishes an administrative structure whereby all writings are reviewed before publication. By contrast, if the State uses its penal system to punish expression outside permissible bounds, the State does not comprehensively review any form of expression; it merely considers "after the event" utterances it has reason to suppose may be prohibited. The breadth of its review of expression is therefore much narrower, and the danger that protected expression will be repressed is less. The operation of the Kansas statute resembles the operation of a penal, rather than a licensing, law in this regard, since books are not, as a matter of course, subjected to prepublication state sanctioning, but are reviewed only when the State has reason to believe they are obscene.

He added other reasons that a post-publication system of suppression was more in keeping with democratic traditions since it allowed the public the possibility of seeing possibly obscene material and judging for itself what the state was trying to restrict and that it put the burden of proof on the state in a full judicial hearing which was open to the public. "Finally, the federal system makes it highly unlikely that the citizenry of one State will be unaware of the kind of material that is being restricted by its own government when there is great divergence among the policies of the various States and a high degree of communication across state lines."

Nor did Harlan share the plurality's concern that such statutes could be used to suppress politically undesirable speech. He called the delay argument "artificial in the context of this case" since there was a significant difference between the news and possibly obscene material:

Distribution of Ulysses may be thought by some to be more important for society than distribution of the daily newspaper, but a one- or two-month delay in circulation of the former would be of small significance, whereas such a delay might be effective suppression of the latter.

== Subsequent developments ==
The Kansas Supreme Court decided the case again in favor of the state, and it was once more appealed. In 1967, the Court granted certiorari again. This time, it merely reversed the decision without setting the case for argument. A one-sentence per curiam opinion cited another recent per curiam holding, Redrup v. New York, where it was held, along with similar cases from other states, that there was a need for a common standard before cases like these could be decided.

Six justices supported the per curiam opinion. Warren agreed with the certiorari grant, but he would have held the case for oral argument. Justice Clark said that he would have granted the petition but affirmed the judgement. Justice Harlan indicated likewise and referenced his opinions in Roth and Memoirs v. Massachusetts, which had been decided in the interim.

In the next term, the Court would use Quantity of Books to bolster its holding against a state film-licensing system in Freedman v. Maryland, as one of several in which it had held that only an adversary hearing prior to restraint sufficed to protect First Amendment rights. Two years later, the Southern District of New York relied on the case to hold a federal seizure of obscene materials from a New York City bookstore unconstitutional, since it too had been insufficiently reviewed in advance. The next year, by contrast, Maryland district judge Roszel Cathcart Thomsen, hearing a bench trial of a man accused of transporting obscene materials across state lines, rejected his argument that the search of his vehicle which produced the two movies at issue had been unconstitutional under Quantity of Books. Thomsen distinguished the two cases with two factors: the Maryland one had involved materials stored in a vehicle rather than a warehouse, and, in it, the defendant was seeking merely to suppress them as evidence rather than contesting a forfeiture.

In 1984, the First Circuit overturned a conviction on the same offense. The defendant there had been arrested and the materials seized on a magistrate's order mentioning only "obscene materials" after federal agents followed him from Boston to Providence. Bailey Aldrich wrote that Marcus as well as Quantity of Books required that warrants for such cases be highly particular and specific as to the material subject to it. "No less a standard could be faithful to First Amendment freedoms" he wrote. Stephen Breyer, later appointed to the Supreme Court himself, dissented. He argued that "it is difficult, if not impossible, given the nature of obscenity and the limitations of language, to write a more specific definition of yet unseen hardcore pornography ... Such language is inevitable if seizures of materials that the magistrate cannot designate by name are ever permissible."

== See also ==
- List of United States Supreme Court cases by the Warren Court
- List of United States Supreme Court cases involving the First Amendment
