= United States v. Forty-Three Gallons of Whiskey =

- Supreme Court of the United States

Decided May 7, 1883
- Full case name: United States v. Forty-Three Gallons of Whisky
- Citations: 108 U.S. 491 (more) 2 S. Ct. 906; 27 L. Ed. 803; 1883 U.S. LEXIS 1058

Holding
- Seizure of alcohol bound for Indian territory is legal as treaties take precedence over state law pursuant to the Supremacy Clause

Court membership
- Chief Justice Morrison Waite Associate Justices Samuel F. Miller · Stephen J. Field; Joseph P. Bradley · John M. Harlan; William B. Woods · Stanley Matthews; Horace Gray · Samuel Blatchford

Case opinion
- Majority: Field, joined by unanimous

Laws applied
- U.S. Const. Art. VI, Clause 2 Nonintercourse Act of 1834

United States v. Forty-Three Gallons of Whiskey, 108 U.S. 491 (1883), is a United States Supreme Court case in which the Court held that Congress has the power to regulate the possession and sale of liquor in the lands of and near Native American tribes and upheld an order to seize barrels containing forty-three gallons of whiskey that were being traded on Native American land.

The form of the styling of the case in which the defendant being an object, rather than a legal person, is caused by it being a jurisdiction in rem (power over objects) case, rather than the more familiar in personam (over persons) case.

== Background ==
In 1872, Bernard Lariviere took unlicensed barrels of whiskey to the Indian village of Crookston, Minnesota, to trade with Native Americans under the assumption that the land belonged to the Chippewa tribe and was thus outside of the United States' jurisdiction, and the federal government seized the barrels under the 1834 Nonintercourse Act.

== Case ==
Lariviere filed a lawsuit claiming that the United States government had no jurisdiction over Indian land. He argued that the whiskey was seized in the organized county of Polk County, Minnesota, and not on Indian territory, as Polk County did not border any Indian lands. Lower courts agreed, holding that the whiskey was unlawfully seized. The United States appealed against this to the Supreme Court.

Writing for the Court, Justice Davis observed that the Treaty of Old Crossing, which ceded the land to the United States, stated that though Crookston was Indian land, legislation passed by Congress would apply in relation to the regulation of liquor being introduced to the area and that trading with the tribes implied consent to the United States legislation. He further wrote that the formation of the State of Minnesota did not ipso facto stop the land being "Indian Country", as Congress had the authority to determine what the boundaries of Native American land were and that Congress had extended the definition of "Indian Country" to the area in which the whiskey was seized as part of an area ceded under the Treaty but not a full Indian reservation. Holding that the treaty superseded state law, the Court vacated the original judgement and remanded the case back to the United States District Court for the District of Minnesota.

The case has been cited as precedent in cases involving Native Americans and alcohol importation.
