= Lion Mark (toys) =

British safety and quality standard for toys

The Lion Mark is a British consumer symbol developed in 1988 by British Toy & Hobby Association (BTHA) and used to identify toys denoted as safe and of high quality.

It represents a red and white lion face in a triangle with a yellow background and green borders.

This conformity mark is voluntary and only members of the British Toy & Hobby Association can use it.

It certifies conformity to EN 71 standards and EN 62115 in the case of electrical toys.

The Lion Mark is also used to indicate shops as "Approved Lion Mark Retailers", in accordance with a joint initiative of the British Toy & Hobby Association with the Toy Retailers Association (TRA).
