= United States v. Article Consisting of 50,000 Cardboard Boxes More or Less, Each Containing One Pair of Clacker Balls =

1976 American legal decision

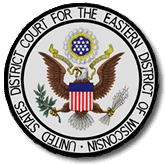
- Court: United States District Court for the Eastern District of Wisconsin
- Full case name: United States of America v. An Article of Hazardous Substance Consisting of 50,000 Cardboard Boxes More or Less, Each Containing One Pair of Clacker Balls
- Decided: May 21, 1976
- Citation: 413 F. Supp. 1281 (E.D. Wisc. 1976)

Court membership
- Judge sitting: Robert W. Warren

United States v. Article Consisting of 50,000 Cardboard Boxes More or Less, Each Containing One Pair of Clacker Balls, 413 F. Supp. 1281 (E.D. Wisc. 1976), is a 1976 United States District Court for the Eastern District of Wisconsin decision regarding a requested order from the United States government to seize and destroy a shipment of approximately 50,000 sets of clacker balls under the Federal Hazardous Substances Act because children could hit themselves with the balls.

The form of the styling of this case—the defendant being an object, rather than a legal person—is because this is a jurisdiction in rem (power over objects) case, rather than the more familiar in personam (over persons) case.

== Background ==
In 1974 in Mequon, Wisconsin, the United States Marshals Service seized a shipment of clacker balls—toys comprising two hard acrylic balls connected by a piece of string—from a dock and published a public notice of the seizure in a local newspaper. Ace Novelty Company in Seattle, Washington, declared an interest in the shipment and filed a complaint against forfeiture. The complaint was that the shipment was not a banned hazard as defined by the Federal Hazardous Substances Act (FHSA).

== Litigation ==
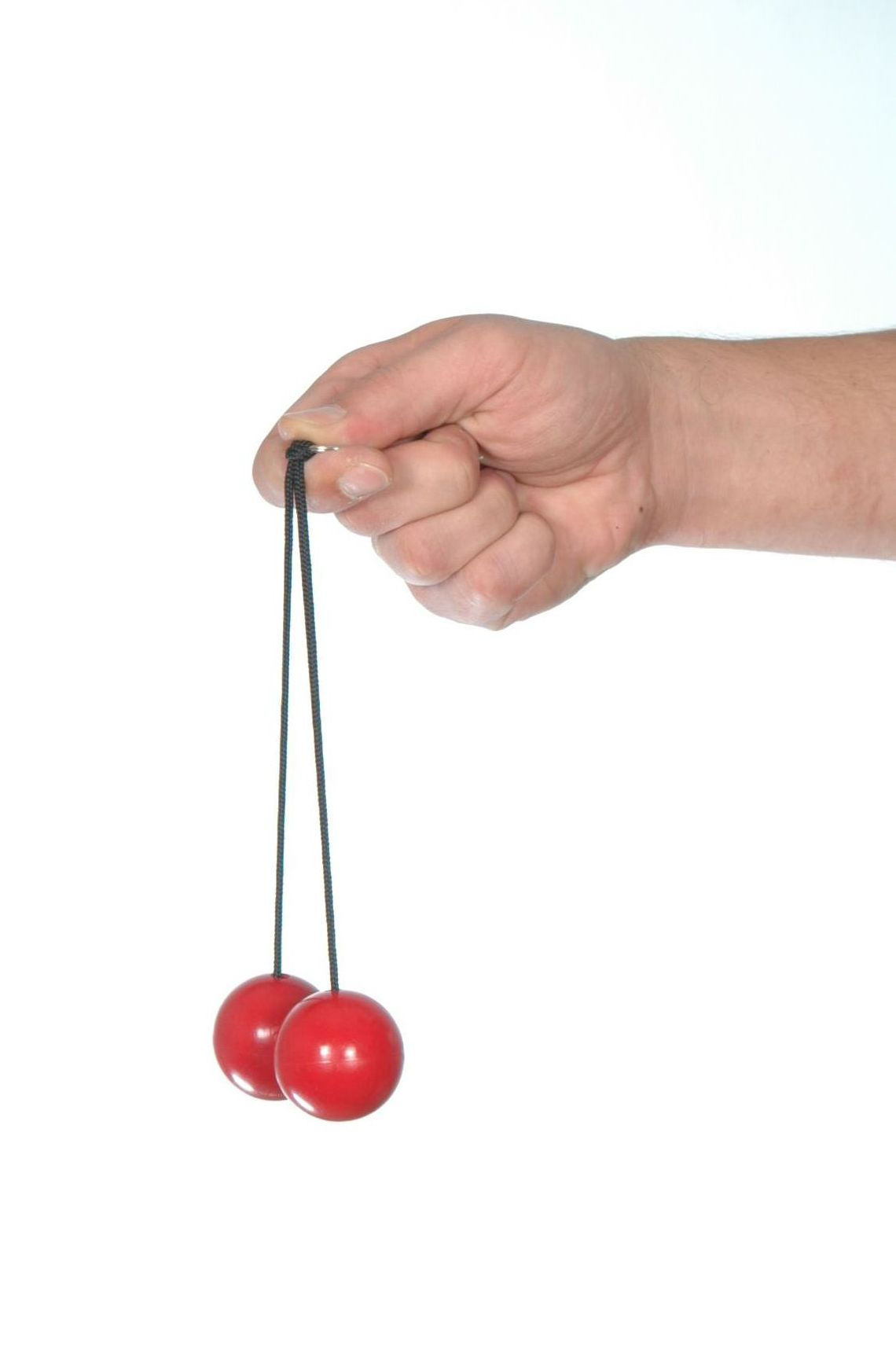
Clacker balls (not necessarily of the style of those in this case)

The claimant initially stated that the case was titled incorrectly because the U.S. Consumer Product Safety Commission had not been named on the caption. The court dismissed this as without merit, pointing out that Section 9 of the FHSA stated that all proceedings regarding enforcement would be done in the name of the United States.

The claimant then stated that the law had been applied unconstitutionally by breaching the Fifth Amendment to the United States Constitution and the right of "due powers [sic]". The judge stated that he was unsure of the intent of this defense as it was not initially filed in the summary judgement and thus the court was unable to make a ruling on it.

The United States' counsel stated that clacker balls were hazardous under section 2 of FHSA, as clarified by regulations of the Consumer Product Safety Commission in 16 C.F.R. § 1500.18(a). The claimant argued that they were not hazardous under FHSA and that there was an exemption made for clacker balls under 16 C.F.R. § 1500.86(a)(5). The court then made the judgment that the United States had the right to seize the shipment under section 15 of FHSA as mechanical hazards and might cause a risk of injury if used by children, that 16 C.F.R. § 1500.86(a)(5) merely provided the opportunity to the claimant to prove that the toy was not hazardous (which was not done), and therefore the exemption from FHSA did not exist. The court then ruled that there was no legal issue and granted the United States the seizure and destruction order for the shipment.

== Legacy ==
Because of the title, it has been viewed as an amusing case and has notoriety in American legal circles for suggesting that the United States sued cardboard boxes with clacker balls. It was one of three cases mentioned in the television show Last Week Tonight with John Oliver's civil forfeiture episode, alongside United States v. $124,700 in U.S. Currency and United States v. Approximately 64,695 Pounds of Shark Fins. It also set a precedent that clackers were classed as hazardous, and is cited in cases regarding the Federal Hazardous Substances Act. It has been opined by legal editors that this case could be used as precedent if other toys were to be classed as illegal.
