= EN 71 =

European standard specifies safety requirements for toys

European standard EN 71 specifies safety requirements for toys. It is harmonised with the Toy Safety Directive (Council Directive 2009/48/EC) and compliance with the standard is legally required for toys sold in the European Union.

EN 71-6

The standard has been published in 14 parts:

- EN 71-1: Mechanical and physical properties
- EN 71-2: Flammability
- EN 71-3: Specification for migration of certain elements
- EN 71-4: Experimental sets for chemistry and related activities
- EN 71-5: Chemical toys (sets) other than experimental sets
- EN 71-6: Graphical symbols for age warning labelling
- EN 71-7: Finger paints
- EN 71-8: Swings, slides and similar activity toys for indoor and outdoor family domestic use
- EN 71-9: Organic chemical compounds – Requirement
- EN 71-10: Organic chemical compounds – Sample preparation and extraction
- EN 71-11: Organic chemical compounds – Methods of analysis
- EN 71-12: N-Nitrosamines and N-Nitrosatable Substances
- EN 71-13: Olfactory board games, cosmetic kits and gustative games
- EN 71-14: Trampolines for domestic use
