= Clackers =

Toy consisting of two balls on a string

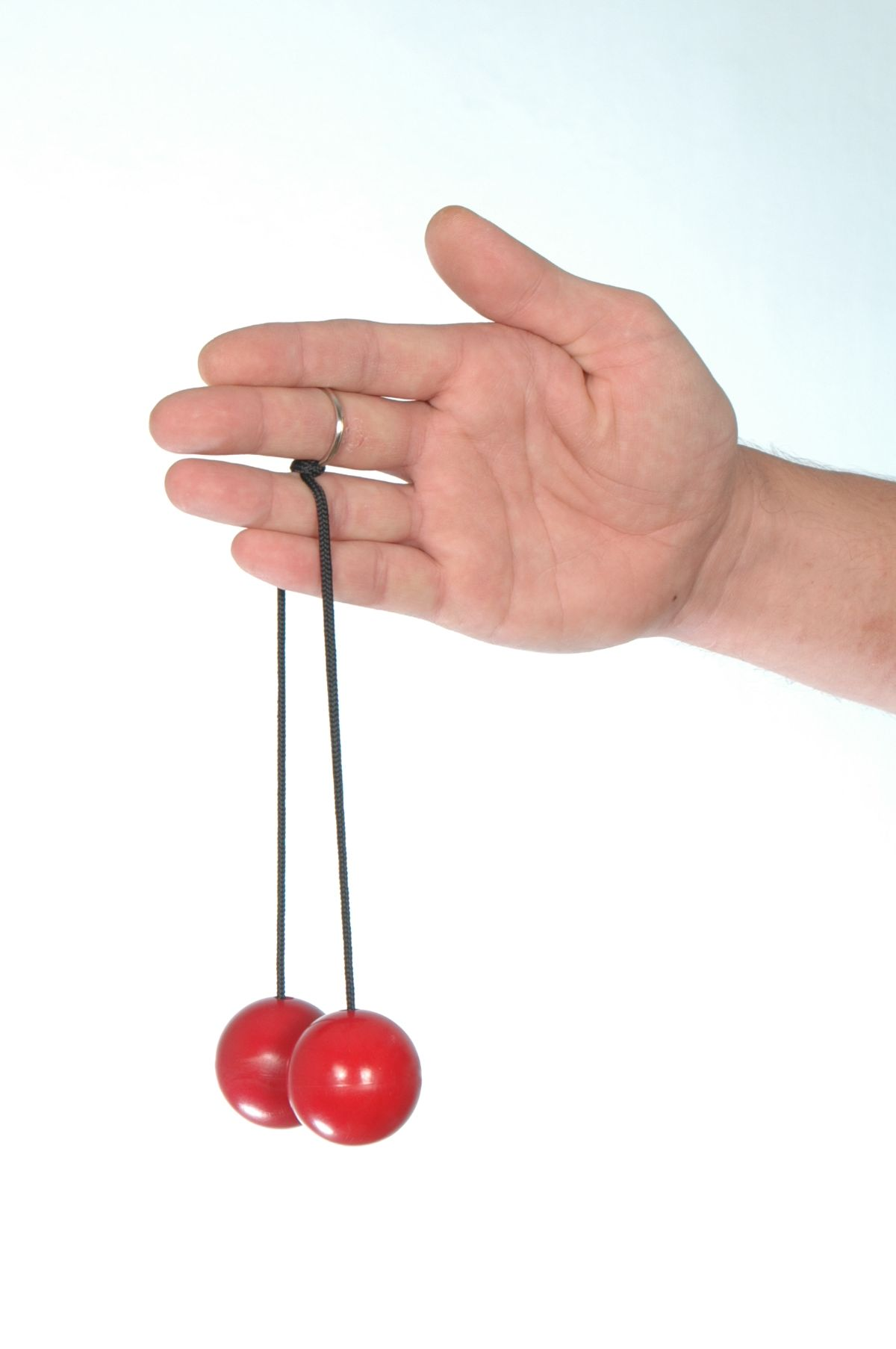
- Other names: Clankers, Ker-bangers, Latto-latto, Sisi's Balls
- Country: United States
- Availability: late 1960s–present
- Materials: Glass (former), Plastic

Clackers (also known as Clankers, Ker-Bangers, latto-latto in the Philippines and most of Southeast Asia, and numerous other names) are toys that were popular in the late 1960s and early 1970s.

The toy is composed of two solid balls of polymer, each about 2 inches (5 cm) in diameter, attached to a finger tab with a sturdy string; the user holds the tab with the balls hanging below. Through up-and-down hand motion, the two balls are made to swing apart and back together, making the clacking noise that gives the toy its name. With practice and skill one can make the balls swing so that they knock together both above and below the hand.

In 1968, tempered glass sphere models were sold that could eventually shatter, injuring users or others nearby. In the early 1970s, manufacturers switched to using plastic.

Clackers are similar in appearance to bolas, the Argentine throwing weapon.

== History ==
The toys were created in the 1960s. Because it was "addicting" to some kids, millions of clackers were sold by the early 1970s.

=== Safety hazard ===
1971 Dutch newsreel covering the toy's popularity as "Klik-klak-rage"

Clackers were taken off the market in the United States and Canada when reports came out of children becoming injured while playing with them. Fairly heavy and fast-moving, and made of hard acrylic plastic, the balls would occasionally shatter upon striking each other. In the United States, they were classed as a "mechanical hazard" in United States v. Article Consisting of 50,000 Cardboard Boxes More or Less, Each Containing One Pair of Clacker Balls.

=== Revival ===
A redesigned version of Clackers enjoyed a revival in the 1990s. The new design used modern plastics which would not shatter and two free-swinging, opposing triangles attached to a handle, with weighted balls at the ends. They are often sold in bright neon colors as noisemaker toys or party favors.

==== Egypt ====
In 2017, the original form of the toy was revived in Egypt and gained popularity among schoolchildren. It became famous under the name "Sisi's balls" referring to the testicles of the Egyptian president Abdel Fattah el-Sisi. The police subsequently arrested 41 clacker sellers and confiscated 1,403 pairs of the toy which they considered offensive to the government.

=== Latto-latto ===
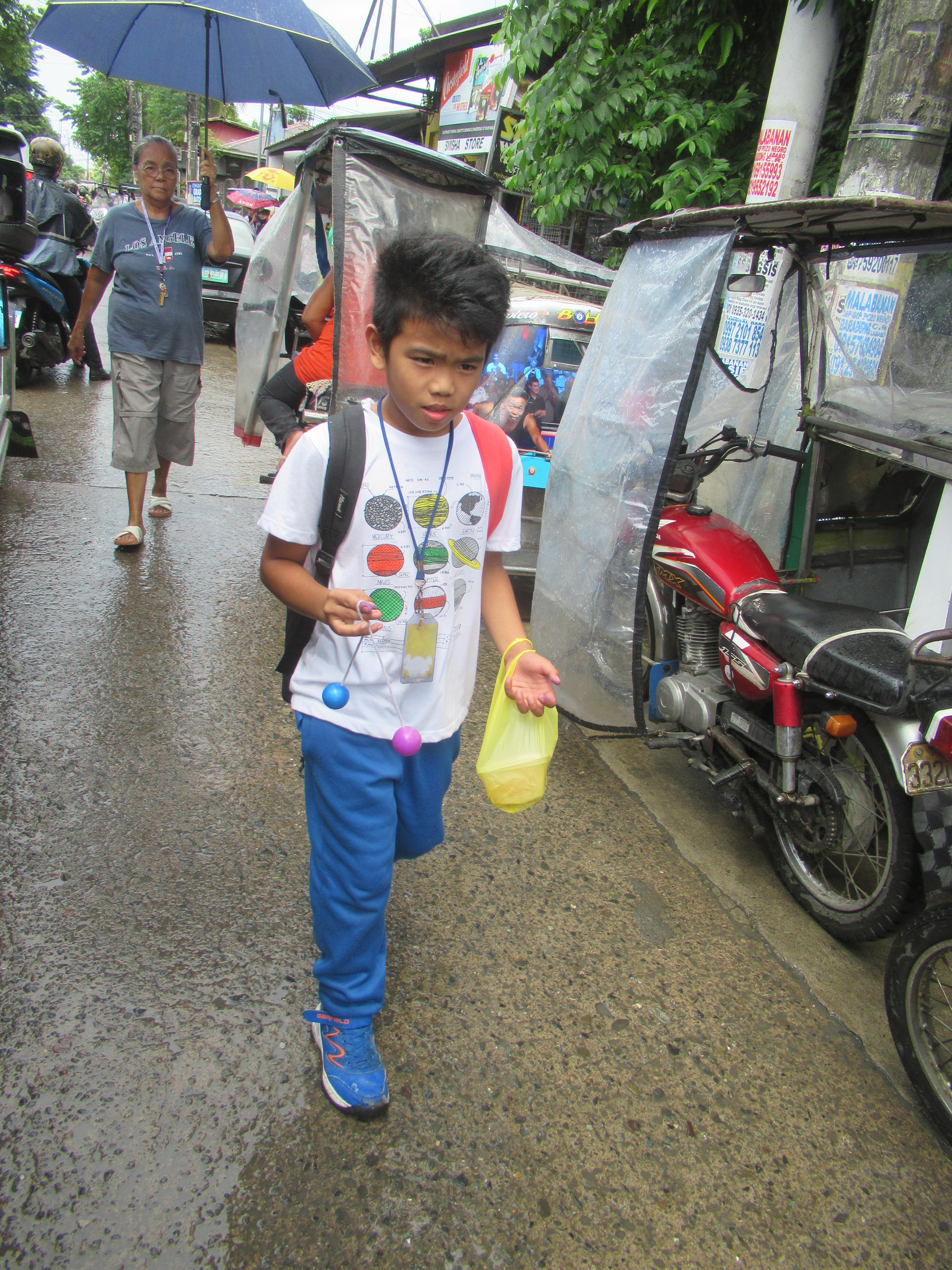
Lato-lato became a popular toy in the Philippines during the 2020s

In late 2022, the toy became popular in Indonesia, where it is known as latto-latto or katto-katto. (Latto is a Buginese word which means a clacking sound, while katto a similar word in Makassarese.) The President of Indonesia Joko Widodo was also seen playing with the toy. Actor Paul Rudd was asked to play with the toy when he visited Indonesia.

Its popularity spread through TikTok to the neighboring Philippines in 2023, where it is known as lato-lato. There were several lato-lato competitions in Luzon, with high cash prizes. A government-launched tourism competition was held in Cainta, Rizal, with kids included. The toy was also popular in Singapore, with Deputy Prime Minister Lawrence Wong playing the toy. In 2024, the toy became popular in Pakistan.

== Description ==
Clackers were two plastic balls, each about 2 inches (5.1 centimetres) in diameter. The balls are attached to a tab with a strong string. The player swings the balls back and forth, creating the clacking sound that describes the name.

== In popular culture ==
Clackers have also made some appearances in pop culture media. Clackers are a plot point in the 1993 "Love and Sausages" episode of The Kids in the Hall TV series. They were also used as weapons by Joseph Joestar in Battle Tendency, the second story arc of the 1980s manga series JoJo's Bizarre Adventure; their appearance there is anachronistic, as Battle Tendency takes place in 1938. They also reappear in the eighth story arc of the manga, JoJolion, in the final chapter released in 2021.

The toys are featured in the US television shows produced by Dan Schneider, most notably in the 2007 Drake & Josh episode "Megan's First Kiss," and in the 2008 Zoey 101 episode "Rumor of Love".

Clackers were also used as weapons in the 2015 Telugu film Bahubali directed by S. S. Rajamouli.

== See also ==
- Conkers
- Eskimo yo-yo
- Newton's cradle
