= In personam =

Type of jurisdiction

In personam is a Latin phrase meaning "against a particular person". In a lawsuit in which the case is against a specific individual, that person must be served with a summons and complaint (in England & Wales known as Particulars of Claim (CPR 1999)) to give the court jurisdiction to try the case, and the judgment applies to that person and is called an "in personam judgment".

In personam is distinguished from in rem, which applies to property or "all the world" instead of a specific person. This technical distinction is important to determine where to file a lawsuit and how to serve a defendant. In personam means that a judgment can be enforceable against the person wherever they are. On the other hand, if the lawsuit is to determine title to property (in rem) then the action must be filed where the property exists and is only enforceable there.

== See also ==
- Personal jurisdiction
- quasi in rem
- in rem
- sui iuris
- Suitable age and discretion
- Prerogative legislation
